= City of Doncaster Council elections =

Local government elections in South Yorkshire, England

The City of Doncaster Council is the local authority for Doncaster in South Yorkshire, England. The council is elected every four years. Since 2002 the council has been led by a directly elected mayor.

From 1973 to 2014, the council was elected by thirds every year except the year in which country council elections took place in other parts of England. In 2015, the whole council was elected due to boundary changes to the wards and it was decided that the whole council would be elected every four years in future from 2017, so that the council elections would coincide with the election of the Mayor of Doncaster in future.

== Council elections ==
- 1998 Doncaster Metropolitan Borough Council election
- 1999 Doncaster Metropolitan Borough Council election
- 2000 Doncaster Metropolitan Borough Council election
- 2002 Doncaster Metropolitan Borough Council election
- 2003 Doncaster Metropolitan Borough Council election
- 2004 Doncaster Metropolitan Borough Council election (whole council elected after boundary changes)
- 2006 Doncaster Metropolitan Borough Council election
- 2007 Doncaster Metropolitan Borough Council election
- 2008 Doncaster Metropolitan Borough Council election
- 2010 Doncaster Metropolitan Borough Council election
- 2011 Doncaster Metropolitan Borough Council election
- 2012 Doncaster Metropolitan Borough Council election
- 2014 Doncaster Metropolitan Borough Council election
- 2015 Doncaster Metropolitan Borough Council election (boundary changes)
- 2017 Doncaster Metropolitan Borough Council election
- 2021 Doncaster Metropolitan Borough Council election
- 2025 City of Doncaster Council election

== Results maps ==
2004 results map

2006 results map

2007 results map

2008 results map

2010 results map

2011 results map

2012 results map

2014 results map

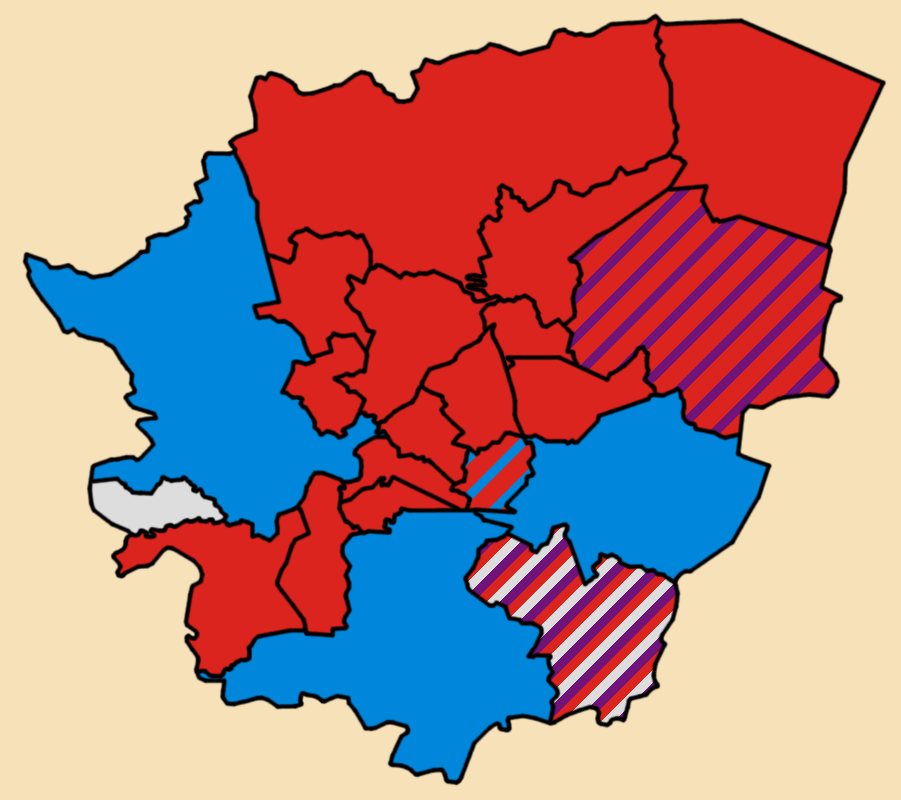
2015 results map

2017 results map

2021 results map

2025 results map

== By-election results ==
=== 1994–1998 ===
Stainforth By-Election 12 February 1998
Party	Candidate	Votes	%	±%
Liberal Democrats		1,330	55.9	+45.2
Labour		1,048	44.1	−27.3
Majority		282	11.8	
Turnout		2,378	19.7	
Liberal Democrats gain from Labour		Swing		

=== 1998–2002 ===
Rossington By-Election 27 August 1998
Party	Candidate	Votes	%	±%
Rossington Independent		538	30.2	+11.4
Labour		533	30.0	+3.5
Independent		456	25.6	−17.8
Conservative		129	7.3	+0.1
Independent		80	4.5	+4.5
Liberal Democrats		43	2.4	+2.4
Majority		5	0.2	
Turnout		1,779	18.0	
Independent gain from Labour		Swing		

Adwick By-Election 3 September 1998
Party	Candidate	Votes	%	±%
Labour		1,071	51.6	
Liberal Democrats		614	29.5	
Conservative		390	18.7	
Majority		457	22.1	
Turnout		2,075	17.0	
Labour hold		Swing		

Wheatley By-Election 3 September 1998
Party	Candidate	Votes	%	±%
Labour		941	45.0	
Liberal Democrats		859	41.1	
Conservative		290	13.8	
Majority		82	3.9	
Turnout		2,090	24.5	
Labour hold		Swing		

Adwick By-Election 12 August 1999
Party	Candidate	Votes	%	±%
Labour		742	38.1	−19.6
Liberal Democrats		620	31.8	−0.1
Ratepayers against Landfill		523	26.8	+26.8
Conservative		122	3.3	−7.1
Majority		122	6.3	
Turnout		2,007		
Labour hold		Swing		

Conisbrough By-Election 18 November 1999
Party	Candidate	Votes	%	±%
Labour		938	53.5	−9.1
Independent Labour		532	30.3	+6.8
Independent		140	8.0	+8.0
Liberal Democrats		76	4.3	−3.0
Conservative		68	3.9	−1.9
Majority		406	23.2	
Turnout		1,754	16.1	
Labour hold		Swing		

Balby By-Election 5 October 2000
Party	Candidate	Votes	%	±%
Labour		763	53.2	−5.0
Liberal Democrats		404	28.2	+10.5
Conservative		266	18.6	−5.6
Majority		359	25.0	
Turnout		1,433	13.9	
Labour hold		Swing		

=== 2002–2006 ===
Stainforth By-Election 20 June 2002
Party	Candidate	Votes	%	±%
Labour	Nora Troops	1,170	56.7	+8.1
Liberal Democrats	Kevin Abell	444	21.5	−1.5
Conservative	Kathleen Fletcher	238	11.5	+0.0
BNP	David Owen	210	10.2	−1.8
Majority		726	35.2	
Turnout		2,062	17.0	
Labour hold		Swing		

Armthorpe By-Election 19 December 2003
Party	Candidate	Votes	%	±%
Labour	Tony Corden	940	49.7	+9.0
Independent		822	43.5	−6.8
Conservative		95	5.0	−4.0
Independent		33	1.7	+1.7
Majority		118	6.2	
Turnout		1,890	14.1	
Labour gain from Independent		Swing		

Mexborough By-Election 19 February 2004
Party	Candidate	Votes	%	±%
Liberal Democrats	Susan Phillips	2,670	56.8	+6.6
Labour		1,866	39.7	−2.9
Conservative		163	3.5	−0.3
Majority		804	17.1	
Turnout		4,699	45.0	
Liberal Democrats hold		Swing		

Central By-Election 5 May 2005
Party	Candidate	Votes	%	±%
Labour	John McHale	2,903	58.0	+17.1
Liberal Democrats	Jonathan Snelling	2,107	42.0	+7.7
Majority		796	16.0	
Turnout		5,010	47.8	
Labour gain from Liberal Democrats		Swing		

=== 2006–2010 ===
Rossington By-Election 19 November 2009
Party	Candidate	Votes	%	±%
Labour	Richard Cooper-Holmes	637	26.9	+1.1
English Democrat	Mick Cooper	551	23.3	
Independent	John Cooke	506	21.4	
Independent	Terry Wilde	420	17.7	
BNP	Dave Owen	101	4.3	+4.3
Liberal Democrats	Robert Mitchell	78	3.3	+3.3
Independent	George Sheldon	76	3.2	
Majority		86	3.6	
Turnout		2,369	24.6	
Labour gain from Independent		Swing		

=== 2010–2015 ===
Askern Spa By-Election 22 August 2013
Party	Candidate	Votes	%	±%
Labour	Iris Beech	1,165	54.0	−16.4
Liberal Democrats	Adrian McLeay	261	12.1	+12.1
UKIP	Frank Calladine	231	10.7	+10.7
Conservative	Martin Greenhalgh	225	10.4	−19.2
Independent	Martyn Bev	106	4.9	+4.9
English Democrat	David Allen	98	4.5	+4.5
TUSC	Mary Jackson	72	3.3	+3.3
Majority		904	41.9	
Turnout		2,158		
Labour hold		Swing		

Edenthorpe, Kirk Sandall and Barnby Dun By-Election 24 July 2014
Party	Candidate	Votes	%	±%
UKIP	Paul Bissett	1,203	40.8	+4.1
Labour	David Nevett	1,109	37.6	+1.9
Conservative	Nick Allen	479	16.2	−3.0
Green	Pete Kennedy	160	5.4	+5.4
Majority		94	3.2	
Turnout		2,951		
UKIP gain from Labour		Swing		

=== 2015–2017 ===
Edenthorpe and Kirk Sandall By-Election 5 May 2016
Party	Candidate	Votes	%	±%
Labour	Andrea Robinson	1,148	44.5	+7.4
UKIP	Paul Bissett	960	37.2	+5.8
Conservative	Martin Greenhalgh	268	10.4	−8.1
Liberal Democrats	Stephen Porter	202	7.8	+7.8
Majority		188	7.3	
Turnout		2,578		
Labour hold		Swing		

=== 2017–2021 ===
Armthorpe By-Election 5 February 2018
Party	Candidate	Votes	%	±%
Labour	Frank Tyas	1,431	75.4	+34.8
Independent	Martin Williams	466	24.6	+24.6
Majority		965	50.9	
Turnout		1,897		
Labour hold		Swing		

Town By-Election 14 June 2018
Party	Candidate	Votes	%	±%
Labour	Tosh McDonald	1,084	46.8	+7.7
Yorkshire	Chris Whitwood	570	24.6	−1.1
Green	Julie Buckley	294	12.7	−1.0
Conservative	Carol Greenhalgh	260	11.2	−10.4
Liberal Democrats	Ian Smith	66	2.8	+2.8
Independent	Gareth Pendry	43	1.9	+1.9
Majority		514	22.2	
Turnout		2,317		
Labour hold		Swing		

=== 2021–2025 ===
Wheatley Hills and Intake By-Election 31 March 2022
Party	Candidate	Votes	%	±%
Labour	Yetunde Elebuibon	827	46.0	+6.1
Conservative	Michael Angus	419	23.3	−2.2
Yorkshire	Andy Budden	356	19.8	+1.9
Green	Jennifer Rozenfelds	135	7.5	−2.8
Liberal Democrats	Dean Southall	60	3.3	−3.1
Majority		408	22.7	
Turnout		1,797		
Labour hold		Swing		

Rossington and Bawtry By-Election 16 November 2023
Party	Candidate	Votes	%	±%
Labour	Ken Guest	1,467	56.7	+10.8
Conservative	Carol Greenhalgh	492	19.0	−1.1
Independent	John Cooke	461	17.8	−8.5
Reform UK	Surjit Singh Duhre	168	6.5	+6.5
Majority		975	37.7	
Turnout		2,588		
Labour hold		Swing		

Town By-Election 4 July 2024
Party	Candidate	Votes	%	±%
Labour	Rob Dennis	2,770	49.8	+6.5
Reform UK	Surjit Singh Duhre	892	16.0	+16.0
Green	Julie Buckley	805	14.5	−3.3
Conservative	Dene Flannigan	723	13.0	−6.4
Independent	Nikki McDonald	373	6.7	+6.7
Majority		1,878	33.8	
Turnout		5,563		
Labour hold		Swing		

=== 2025–2029 ===
Bentley By-Election 21 August 2025
Party	Candidate	Votes	%	±%
Reform UK	Isaiah-John Reasbeck	1,062	43.8	
Labour	Matthew Jones	912	37.6	
Independent	Jane Nightingale	169	7.0	
Conservative	Christine Lunney	121	5.0	
Green	Venessa Aradia	79	3.3	
Liberal Democrats	Giulia Savini	39	1.6	
TUSC	Andy Hiles	29	1.2	
Workers Party	Ahsan Jamil	15	0.6	
Majority		150	6.2	
Turnout		2,426		
Reform UK hold		Swing		
