= 2015 Doncaster Metropolitan Borough Council election =

2015 local election in England

← 2014	7 May 2015	2017 →

All 55 seats to Doncaster Metropolitan Borough Council 28 seats needed for a majority
	First party	Second party
Party	Labour	Conservative
Seats won	41	8
	Third party	Fourth party
Party	Mexborough First	UKIP
Seats won	3	2
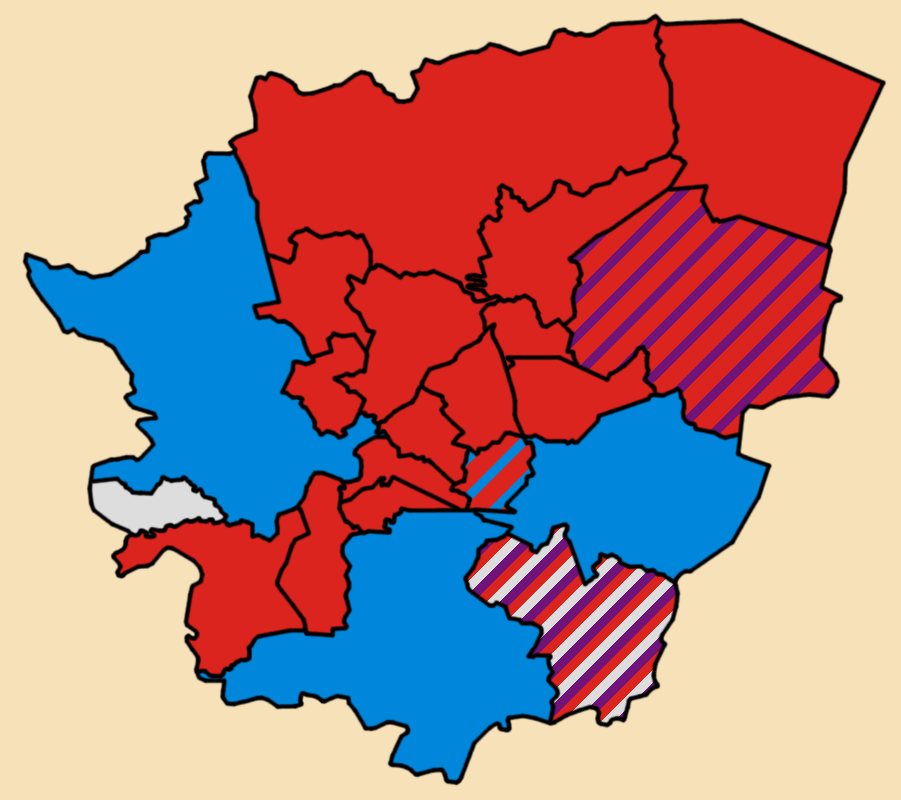
- Map showing the results of the 2015 Doncaster Council elections.
Council control before election
Labour
Council control after election
Labour

The 2015 Doncaster Metropolitan Borough Council election took place on 7 May 2015 to elect all members of Doncaster Council in England. This was on the same day as other local elections. Due to boundary changes all 55 seats were up for election.

The election resulted in the Labour Party retaining control of the council, with a majority of 27 seats.

== Result ==
This result had the following consequences for the total number of seats on the council after the elections:

Party	Previous council	New council
Labour	48	41
Conservative	8	8
Mexborough First	3	3
UKIP	1	2
Independent	3	1
Total	63	55
Working majority	33	27

== Ward results ==
The electoral division results are listed below.

Spoilt ballots are not included in the below results.

=== Adwick and Carcroft ward ===
Adwick and Carcroft
Party	Candidate	Votes	%	±%
Labour	John Mounsey	2,812	47.5	
Labour	Ted Kitchen	2,649	44.7	
Labour	Rachel Hodson	2,098	35.4	
UKIP	Ryan Morling	1,720	29.0	
Green	David Carroll	700	11.8	
Conservative	Keith Oades	690	11.7	
Liberal Democrats	John Victor Butterfield	622	10.5	
TUSC	Jason Fawley	466	7.9	
Turnout			53.7	
Labour win (new seat)				
Labour win (new seat)				
Labour win (new seat)				

=== Armthorpe ward ===
Armthorpe
Party	Candidate	Votes	%	±%
Labour	Tony Corden	2,709	46.8	
Labour	Chris McGuinness	2,496	43.1	
Labour	Sue McGuinness	2,386	41.2	
UKIP	Nigel Berry	2,260	38.2	
Conservative	Alexandra Laura Allen	1,247	21.1	
Liberal Democrats	Patricia Cooney	638	10.8	
Green	Mark Gray	605	10.2	
Independent	John Raymond Lowndes	575	9.7	
Turnout			54.5	
Labour win (new seat)				
Labour win (new seat)				
Labour win (new seat)				

=== Balby South ward ===
Balby South
Party	Candidate	Votes	%	±%
Labour	John Healy	1,867	48.2	
Labour	Nuala Mary Fennelly	1,419	36.7	
UKIP	James Cotterill	1,385	35.8	
Conservative	John Thomas Papworth	906	23.4	
Green	David Ingram	278	7.2	
TUSC	Robert James Green	192	5.0	
Green	Jordan James Ingram	162	4.2	
Turnout			52.4	
Labour win (new seat)				
Labour win (new seat)				

=== Bentley ward ===
Bentley
Party	Candidate	Votes	%	±%
Labour	Bill Mordue	3,006	47.0	
Labour	Charlie Hogarth	2,831	44.3	
Labour	Jane Nightingale	2,760	43.2	
UKIP	Tony Ward	2,046	32.0	
Conservative	Brian Woodhouse	1,165	18.2	
Green	Christine Florence Platt	700	10.9	
English Democrat	Keith John Hewitt	634	9.9	
Liberal Democrats	Rene Paterson	508	7.9	
TUSC	Steven Flint	446	7.0	
Turnout			51.1	
Labour win (new seat)				
Labour win (new seat)				
Labour win (new seat)				

=== Bessacarr and Cantley ward ===
Bessacarr and Cantley
Party	Candidate	Votes	%	±%
Labour	Neil Gethin	1,982	28.4	
Labour	Majid Khan	1,864	26.7	
Conservative	Nick Allen	1,821	26.1	
Labour	Bob Johnson	1,744	25.0	
UKIP	Paul Coddington	1,729	24.8	
UKIP	Paul Alexander Pickering	1,504	21.6	
Conservative	Leon French	1,425	20.4	
UKIP	Bernie Aston	1,364	19.6	
Independent	Monty Cuthbert	1,316	18.9	
Liberal Democrats	Edwin Simpson	920	13.2	
Liberal Democrats	John Brown	867	12.4	
Liberal Democrats	Dianna Simpson	615	8.8	
Green	Doug Wright	611	8.8	
English Democrat	Barbara Hewitt	364	5.2	
Turnout			62.6	
Labour win (new seat)				
Labour win (new seat)				
Conservative win (new seat)				

=== Conisbrough ward ===
Conisbrough ward
Party	Candidate	Votes	%	±%
Labour	Nigel Ball	3,642	55.2	
Labour	Sandra Mary Holland	2,983	45.2	
Labour	Craig Bernard Sahman	2,471	37.5	
UKIP	Deborah Cotterill	2,026	30.7	
UKIP	Jonathan Ellis	1,818	27.6	
UKIP	William Shaw	1,477	22.4	
Conservative	Margaret Beard	786	11.9	
Green	Andy Fisher	474	7.2	
TUSC	Steve Williams	424	6.4	
English Democrat	John Brennan	405	6.1	
Turnout			56.7	
Labour win (new seat)				
Labour win (new seat)				
Labour win (new seat)				

=== Edenthorpe and Kirk Sandall ward ===
Edenthorpe and Kirk Sandall
Party	Candidate	Votes	%	±%
Labour	David Nevett	1,857	40.3	
Labour	Tony Revill	1,687	36.6	
UKIP	Paul Bissett	1,573	34.1	
UKIP	Fred Gee	1,344	29.1	
Conservative	Christine Yvonne Allen	926	20.1	
Independent	Karen Hampson	536	11.6	
Independent	Anton Josef Fix	245	5.3	
TUSC	Greg Beaumont	117	2.5	
Turnout			61.1	
Labour win (new seat)				
Labour win (new seat)				

=== Edlington and Warmsworth ward ===
Edlington and Warmsworth
Party	Candidate	Votes	%	±%
Labour	Phil Cole	2,337	51.8	
Labour	Elsie Butler	2,158	47.9	
UKIP	Richard Coulthard	1,295	28.7	
UKIP	Noel Middleton	862	19.1	
Conservative	Liz Jones	739	16.4	
Green	Bob Gilbert	320	7.1	
Turnout			58.5	
Labour win (new seat)				
Labour win (new seat)				

=== Finningley ward ===
Finningley
Party	Candidate	Votes	%	±%
Conservative	Jane Cox	2,901	35.7	
Conservative	Allan Jones	2,711	33.4	
Conservative	Steve Cox	2,656	32.7	
UKIP	Ross Atkinson	2,261	27.8	
Labour	Roni Chapman	2,245	27.6	
Labour	Lynne Rothwell	2,193	27.0	
UKIP	Guy Aston	1,881	23.2	
Labour	Frank Jackson	1,674	20.6	
UKIP	Karl Goodman	1,476	18.2	
Green	Olivia Ruth Brabazon	857	10.6	
Liberal Democrats	David Pratt	668	8.2	
TUSC	Anthony Hadrian Blakesley	256	3.2	
Turnout			66.2	
Conservative win (new seat)				
Conservative win (new seat)				
Conservative win (new seat)				

=== Hatfield ward ===
Hatfield
Party	Candidate	Votes	%	±%
Labour	Linda Curran	2,691	40.9	
Labour	Pat Knight	2,382	36.2	
UKIP	Jessie Credland	2,375	36.1	
UKIP	Mick Glynn	2,371	36.0	
Labour	Ron Powell	1,916	29.1	
UKIP	Anne Rutherford	1,746	26.5	
Conservative	Ben Wagstaff	1,410	21.4	
Green	Ali Hurworth	529	8.0	
Turnout			58.1	
Labour win (new seat)				
Labour win (new seat)				
UKIP win (new seat)				

=== Hexthorpe and Balby North ward ===
Hexthorpe and Balby North
Party	Candidate	Votes	%	±%
Labour	Glyn Jones	1,902	53.6	
Labour	Sue Wilkinson	1,625	45.8	
UKIP	Mike Robertson	1,382	39.0	
TUSC	Theresa Joan Rollinson	405	11.4	
Turnout			49.2	
Labour win (new seat)				
Labour win (new seat)				

=== Mexborough ward ===
Mexborough
Party	Candidate	Votes	%	±%
Mexborough First	Andy Pickering	2,811	47.4	
Mexborough First	Sean Gibbons	2,802	47.3	
Mexborough First	Bev Chapman	2,259	38.1	
Labour	Sue Phillips	1,709	28.8	
Labour	Tracey Leyland-Jepson	1,575	26.6	
Labour	David Holland	1,273	21.5	
UKIP	Chris Haret	980	16.5	
UKIP	Brian Whitmore	896	15.1	
UKIP	Mick Reilly	719	12.1	
Green	Ann Jackson Gilbert	272	4.6	
Turnout			52.3	
Mexborough First hold		Swing		
Mexborough First hold		Swing		
Mexborough First hold		Swing		

=== Norton and Askern ward ===
Norton and Askern
Party	Candidate	Votes	%	±%
Labour	Alan Jones	2,749	40.8	
Labour	Iris Beech	2,649	39.3	
Labour	Austin William White	2,522	37.4	
UKIP	Charles Morris	2,242	33.2	
Conservative	Martin Drake	1,914	28.4	
Conservative	Carol Greenhalgh	1,572	23.3	
Liberal Democrats	Adrian Jonathan McLeay	787	11.7	
TUSC	Rhiannon Mary Bartlett	405	6.0	
Turnout			62.1	
Labour win (new seat)				
Labour win (new seat)				
Labour win (new seat)				

=== Roman Ridge ward ===
Roman Ridge
Party	Candidate	Votes	%	±%
Labour	Kevin Rodgers	2,033	40.2	
Labour	Pat Haith	2,033	40.2	
UKIP	Jack Kelley	1,163	23.0	
UKIP	Darius Cooper	1,154	22.8	
Conservative	Doreen Woodhouse	915	18.1	
Green	Stephen Platt	503	9.9	
Green	Warren Peter Draper	295	5.8	
TUSC	Ann-Louise Bayley	120	2.4	
Turnout			60.2	
Labour win (new seat)				
Labour win (new seat)				

=== Rossington and Bawtry ward ===
Rossington and Bawtry
Party	Candidate	Votes	%	±%
Labour	Rachael Blake	2,653	36.0	
Independent	John Cooke	2,233	30.3	
UKIP	Clive Stone	1,885	25.6	
Labour	Graham Keith Guest	1,744	23.6	
Conservative	Martin Damian Greenhalgh	1,714	23.3	
Labour	Robert Reid	1,611	21.8	
UKIP	Mike Volante	1,593	21.6	
Independent	Richard Cooper-Holmes	1,242	16.8	
Green	Kelly Maria Connolly	1,047	14.2	
Independent	Ali Harper	828	11.2	
Turnout			58.1	
Labour win (new seat)				
Independent win (new seat)				
UKIP win (new seat)				

=== Sprotbrough ward ===
Sprotbrough
Party	Candidate	Votes	%	±%
Conservative	Cynthia Anne Ransome	2,306	38.4	
Conservative	Jonathan Wood	2,165	36.0	
Labour	Tony Bryan	1,889	31.4	
Labour	Andrew Bosmans	1,631	27.2	
UKIP	Frank Calladine	1,077	17.9	
UKIP	Phyllis Calladine	968	16.1	
Green	Lynette Chipp	704	11.7	
Turnout			66.8	
Conservative win (new seat)				
Conservative win (new seat)				

=== Stainforth and Barnby Dun ward ===
Stainforth and Barnby Dun
Party	Candidate	Votes	%	±%
Labour	Ken Keegan	1,747	43.6	
Labour	George Derx	1,295	32.3	
UKIP	John Waggitt	1,059	26.4	
UKIP	Keith Jaques	1,037	25.9	
Conservative	Terry Taylor	824	20.5	
Green	Veronica Jane Maxwell	273	6.8	
TUSC	Mary Jackson	143	3.6	
Turnout			56.1	
Labour win (new seat)				
Labour win (new seat)				

=== Thorne and Moorends ward ===
Thorne and Moorends
Party	Candidate	Votes	%	±%
Labour	Susan Jane Durant	2,412	36.3	
Labour	Joe Blackham	2,292	34.5	
Labour	Mark Houlbrook	2,248	33.9	
Community Group	Martin Williams	1,963	29.6	
UKIP	Kevin Abell	1,643	27.2	
UKIP	Kim Parkinson	1,618	26.8	
UKIP	Shaun Hirst	1,331	22.0	
Community Group	Lyndsey Clark	1,029	17.0	
Conservative	John Brown	882	14.6	
Community Group	Stewart Rayner	805	13.3	
TUSC	Brenda Nixon	207	3.4	
Turnout			54.3	
Labour win (new seat)				
Labour win (new seat)				
Labour win (new seat)				

=== Tickhill and Wadworth ward ===
Tickhill and Wadworth
Party	Candidate	Votes	%	±%
Conservative	Alan Smith	1,686	30.6	
Conservative	James Vincent Hart	1,644	29.9	
Labour	Shane McLeavey	1,493	27.1	
Independent	Nigel John Cannings	1,396	25.4	
Labour	Carrie Wilson	1,374	25.0	
UKIP	Rebecca Walters	1,223	22.2	
UKIP	Ian Stewart	1,069	19.4	
Turnout			67.3	
Conservative win (new seat)				
Conservative win (new seat)				

=== Town ward ===
Town ward
Party	Candidate	Votes	%	±%
Labour	John McHale	2,662	43.2	
Labour	Sue Knowles	2,633	42.8	
Labour	Dave Shaw	2,591	42.1	
UKIP	Roy Penketh	1,500	24.4	
UKIP	Dene Clark-Flannigan	1,452	23.6	
Conservative	Maurice Field	1,306	21.2	
Green	Anna Symington	972	15.8	
TUSC	Mev Akram	394	6.4	
TUSC	Joseph Henry	296	4.8	
Turnout			51.8	
Labour win (new seat)				
Labour win (new seat)				
Labour win (new seat)				

=== Wheatley Hills and Intake ward ===
Wheatley Hills and Intake
Party	Candidate	Votes	%	±%
Labour	Eva Hughes	2,898	43.1	
Labour	Jane Kidd	2,806	41.7	
Labour	Paul Wray	2,661	39.6	
UKIP	Mick Andrews	1,990	29.6	
UKIP	Alistair Gerald Brogan	1,677	24.9	
UKIP	Michelle Goodman	1,482	22.0	
Conservative	Neil Saran Srivastava	1,106	16.5	
Green	Jane Louise Masheter	562	8.4	
TUSC	Lee Jonathan Jepson	233	3.5	
Independent	Richie Vallance	193	2.9	
Turnout			52.4	
Labour win (new seat)				
Labour win (new seat)				
Labour win (new seat)				
