= 2014 Doncaster Metropolitan Borough Council election =

Results of the 2014 Doncaster Metropolitan Borough election

← 2012	22 May 2014	2015 →

One third (21 of 63) seats to Doncaster Metropolitan Borough Council 32 seats needed for a majority
	First party	Second party	Third party
Party	Labour	Conservative	UKIP
Seats won	15	3	1
Seat change	▼2	0	▲1
Popular vote	26,552	8,880	22,046
Percentage	38.2%	12.8%	31.7%
Swing	▲2.3%	▼7.4%	▲30.5%
- Map showing the results of the 2014 Doncaster Council elections.
Council control before election
Labour
Council control after election
Labour

The 2014 Doncaster Metropolitan Borough Council election took place on 22 May 2014 as part of the 2014 local elections in the United Kingdom. One third of 63 seats were up for election. The 2014 European Parliament Elections were also held on the same day.

The election resulted in the Labour Party retaining its control of the council, with a slightly reduced majority after losing two seats overall. UKIP won a substantial number of votes at this election, increasing its vote share by 30.5%, but only won a single seat. The Liberal Democrats lost the only seat they were defending. After the election, the composition of the council was:

- Labour 48
- Conservative 8
- UKIP 1
- Others 6

== Result ==
Doncaster Metropolitan Borough Council election, 2014
Party	Seats	Gains	Losses	Net gain/loss	Seats %	Votes %	Votes	+/−
Labour	15	1	3	-2		38.2	26,552	
Conservative	3	0	0	0		12.8	8,880	
UKIP	1	1	0	+1		31.7	22,046	
Mexborough First	1	1	0	+1		1.7	1,193	
Independent	1	1	0	+1		2.9	1,981	
Liberal Democrats	0	0	1	-1		3.6	2,519	
TUSC	0	0	0	0		2.2	1,556	
Doncaster First Independents Group	0	0	0	0		2.1	1,469	
Green	0	0	0	0		1.9	1,341	
English Democrat	0	0	0	0		1.8	1,241	
Community Group	0	0	0	0		1.0	673	

== Ward results ==
The results in each ward are shown below. Changes are compared with the previous election in 2010.

=== Adwick ===
Adwick
Party	Candidate	Votes	%	±%
Labour	John Mounsey	1,559	50.7	−1.3
UKIP	Ian Stewart	896	29.1	N/A
TUSC	Jason Lee Fawley	259	8.4	N/A
English Democrat	Joanne Allen	180	5.9	−11.8
Liberal Democrats	John Victor Butterfield	180	5.9	−12.9
Turnout		3,074	28.4	−24.4
Labour hold		Swing		

=== Armthorpe ===
Armthorpe
Party	Candidate	Votes	%	±%
Labour	Chris McGuinness	1,286	39.3	+0.1
UKIP	Louise Emery	975	29.8	N/A
Independent	Scott Andrew Pickles	666	20.3	N/A
Conservative	Kenneth Allen	231	7.1	−6.9
TUSC	Joyce Mary Sheppard	116	3.5	N/A
Turnout		3,274	30	−25.6
Labour hold		Swing		

=== Askern Spa ===
Askern Spa
Party	Candidate	Votes	%	±%
Labour	Iris Beech	1,473	46.5	−2.1
UKIP	Phyllis Calladine	1,229	38.8	N/A
Liberal Democrats	Adrian Jonathan McLeay	469	14.8	N/A
Turnout		3,171	32.8	
Labour hold		Swing		

=== Balby ===
Balby
Party	Candidate	Votes	%	±%
Labour	Andrew Bosmans	1,330	42.5	+0.4
UKIP	Steve Shukla	1,075	34.3	N/A
Conservative	Alex Allen	430	13.7	−10.9
Green	Jordan Ingram	180	5.7	N/A
Liberal Democrats	Edwin Simpson	118	3.8	N/A
Turnout		3,133	28.2	−25.4
Labour hold		Swing		

=== Bentley ===
Bentley
Party	Candidate	Votes	%	±%
Labour	Frank Jackson	1,333	48.5	+1.5
UKIP	Eddie Storey	1,170	42.6	N/A
Liberal Democrats	Rene Paterson	124	4.5	N/A
TUSC	Julia Welbourn	122	4.4	N/A
Turnout		2,749	27.5	−22.1
Labour hold		Swing		

=== Bessacarr & Cantley ===
Bessacarr & Cantley
Party	Candidate	Votes	%	±%
Labour	Neil Gethin	1,022	25.8	+3.1
UKIP	Bernie Aston	880	22.2	N/A
Liberal Democrats	Diana Simpson	858	21.7	−13.1
Conservative	Barbara Fletcher	695	17.6	−8.8
English Democrat	Barbara Hewitt	263	6.6	−9.4
Green	Ali Hurworth	124	3.1	N/A
Doncaster First Independents Group	Richard Walker	115	2.9	N/A
Turnout		3,957	35.2	
Labour gain from Liberal Democrats		Swing		

=== Central ===
Central
Party	Candidate	Votes	%	±%
Labour	John McHale	1,787	55.7	+4.8
UKIP	David Roy Harrison	906	28.2	N/A
Conservative	Nick Allen	239	7.4	−6.2
TUSC	Mal Perkins	148	4.6	N/A
Independent	John Garner	130	4	N/A
Turnout		3,210	29.7	−19.5
Labour hold		Swing		

=== Conisbrough & Denaby ===
Conisbrough & Denaby
Party	Candidate	Votes	%	±%
Labour	Sandra Mary Holland	1,568	49.6	−8.2
UKIP	William Shaw	1,265	40	N/A
TUSC	Steve Williams	327	10.3	N/A
Turnout		3,160	30.7	−23
Labour hold		Swing		

=== Edenthorpe, Kirk Sandall & Barnby Dun ===
Edenthorpe, Kirk Sandall & Barnby Dun
Party	Candidate	Votes	%	±%
UKIP	Fred Gee	1,304	36.7	N/A
Labour	David Nevett	1,267	35.7	+11.7
Conservative	Chris Allen	681	19.2	−1.1
English Democrat	Keith Hewitt	198	5.6	−10.6
TUSC	Greg Beaumont	102	2.9	N/A
Turnout		3,552	33.2	−29.8
UKIP gain from Labour		Swing		

=== Edlington & Warmsworth ===
Edlington and Warmsworth
Party	Candidate	Votes	%	±%
Labour	Elsie Butler	1,246	37.3	−0.2
UKIP	Kim Parkinson	817	24.5	N/A
Doncaster First Independents Group	Georgina Mullis	746	22.4	N/A
Conservative	Liz Jones	202	6.1	−8.3
English Democrat	John Brennan	121	3.6	−13.5
Green	David Ingram	113	3.4	N/A
TUSC	Nigel Leslie Jurgens	92	2.8	N/A
Turnout		3,337	32.5	−25.3
Labour hold		Swing		

=== Finningley ===
Finningley
Party	Candidate	Votes	%	±%
Conservative	Allan Jones	1,473	34.1	−2.9
UKIP	Mick Andrews	1,375	31.8	N/A
Labour	Tony Bryan	952	22	+3.6
Doncaster First Independents Group	Marc Bratcher	300	6.9	N/A
Liberal Democrats	David Pratt	225	5.2	−19.5
Turnout		4,325	35.6	−32.3
Conservative hold		Swing		

=== Great North Road ===
Great North Road
Party	Candidate	Votes	%	±%
Labour	Kevin Rodgers	1,828	47.8	+11.3
UKIP	Jack Kelley	1,516	39.7	N/A
Green	Stephen Platt	477	12.5	+3.6
Turnout		3,821	32.6	−25.9
Labour hold		Swing		

=== Hatfield ===
Hatfield
Party	Candidate	Votes	%	±%
Labour	Linda Curran	1,403	43.8	+10
UKIP	Mick Glynn	1,258	39.3	+33.9
Conservative	Amy Atkinson	468	14.6	−5.1
TUSC	Bob Venus	75	2.3	N/A
Turnout		3,204	32.1	
Labour hold		Swing	-26.8	

=== Mexborough ===
Mexborough
Party	Candidate	Votes	%	±%
Mexborough First	Andy Pickering	1,193	35.3	N/A
Labour	David Holland	1,073	31.8	−8.3
UKIP	Frank Lloyd Calladine	949	28.1	N/A
English Democrat	Brian Whitmore	82	2.4	−4.7
Green	Ann Gilbert	82	2.4	N/A
Turnout		3,379	29.5	−22.6
Mexborough First gain from Labour		Swing		

=== Rossington ===
Rossington
Party	Candidate	Votes	%	±%
Independent	John Cooke	1,185	39.1	N/A
Labour	John Healy	871	28.7	−3.9
UKIP	Dave Matthews	599	19.8	N/A
Conservative	Kathleen Margaret Beard	195	6.4	−3.1
English Democrat	Carol Young	180	5.9	−7.6
Turnout		3,030	30.7	
Independent gain from Labour		Swing	-23.5	

=== Sprotbrough ===
Sprotbrough
Party	Candidate	Votes	%	±%
Conservative	Alan Smith	1,240	35.3	−2.5
Labour	Nigel Ball	958	27.3	−0.9
UKIP	Paul Bissett	867	24.7	N/A
Green	Bob Gilbert	233	6.6	−6.4
English Democrat	David Allen	217	6.2	−14.8
Turnout		3,515	36.9	−30.6
Conservative hold		Swing		

=== Stainforth & Moorends ===
Stainforth & Moorends
Party	Candidate	Votes	%	±%
Labour	Barbara Hedley	1,036	40.9	+2.9
UKIP	Mike Overton	989	39.1	+31
Conservative	Martin Drake	373	14.7	−5.5
TUSC	Mary Jackson	132	5.2	N/A
Turnout		2,530	26.4	−25.7
Labour hold		Swing		

=== Thorne ===
Thorne
Party	Candidate	Votes	%	±%
Labour	Mark Houlbrook	977	30.5	+3
UKIP	Tina O'Halloran	955	29.8	N/A
Conservative	John Brown	519	16.2	−6.8
Community Group	Karen Redmile	673	21	+9.1
TUSC	Brenda Denise Nixon	77	2.4	N/A
Turnout		3,201	30	−27.7
Labour hold		Swing		

=== Torne Valley ===
Torne Valley
Party	Candidate	Votes	%	±%
Conservative	James Vincent Hart	1,306	34.3	−7.8
UKIP	Rebecca Walters	1,120	29.4	+21.8
Labour	Eddie Dobbs	805	21.2	+1.7
Liberal Democrats	David Adgar	342	9	−14.2
Green	Andy Fisher	132	3.5	N/A
Doncaster First Independents Group	Ray Mullis	99	2.6	N/A
Turnout		3,804	38.5	−30.9
Conservative hold		Swing		

=== Town Moor ===
Town Moor
Party	Candidate	Votes	%	±%
Labour	Jane Kidd	1,408	44.9	+10.7
UKIP	Charles Guy Aston	975	31.1	+26.3
Conservative	Stephen Leslie Cox	446	14.2	−3.2
Liberal Democrats	John Brown	203	6.5	−23.6
TUSC	Rob Green	106	3.4	N/A
Turnout		3,138	30.9	−24.3
Labour hold		Swing		

=== Wheatley ===
Wheatley
Party	Candidate	Votes	%	±%
Labour	Dave Shaw	1,370	46.9	+6.4
UKIP	Anne Rutherford	961	32.9	N/A
Conservative	Maurice Field	382	13.1	N/A
Doncaster First Independents Group	Gareth Shanks	209	7.2	N/A
Turnout		2,922	29.3	−21.8
Labour hold		Swing		
