= Mexborough First =

- Leader: Andrew Pickering
- Founder: Andrew Pickering
- Founded: 17 March 2014; 12 years ago
- Headquarters: Mexborough, South Yorkshire
- Ideology: Localism
- Colours: Black

Website
- mexboroughfirst.org.uk

Mexborough First is a localist political party based in Mexborough, South Yorkshire in England. It was founded in 2014 and held two of the town's three seats on City of Doncaster Council until 2025.

== History ==
The party was founded in 2014 by Andrew Pickering, who had previously run for election as an independent in 2012. The party had emerged out of a local campaign against a supermarket being built in the town.

The party first contested an election in the 2014 Doncaster Metropolitan Borough Council election, where Pickering gained the Mexborough ward from Labour.

Starting in the 2015 Borough Council election, Mexborough had three council seats to contest, all of which were won by Mexborough First. This led to the party becoming the third largest on the council behind Labour and the Conservatives.

The party held their three seats in the 2017 election, and did so again in the 2021 election.

In November 2023, one of the party's councillors, Bev Chapman, left the party to sit as an independent. She stated that she could no longer work with the party's deputy leader Sean Gibbons. Gibbons responded by saying she would have been removed for the party at their next meeting anyway. This reduced the party to two seats on the council. That December, Chapman announced she had joined the Labour party, saying that "nothing major" had been achieved in the eight and a half years she was a member of Mexborough First.

In the 2025 City of Doncaster Council election, the party, listed as Always Putting Mexborough First, lost all three of their seats to Reform UK.

== Beliefs ==
The party opposes the construction of High Speed 2, which councillors predict would lead to the demolition of 200 homes. It says that funding should be used to increase transport connections in the North of England.
