= 2025 City of Doncaster Council election =

2025 English local election

← 2021	1 May 2025

All 55 seats to City of Doncaster Council 28 seats needed for a majority

	First party	Second party	Third party
Party	Reform UK	Labour	Conservative
Last election	0 seats, 0.3%	40 seats, 40.2%	11 seats, 31.3%
Seats before	0	41	11
Seats won	37	12	6
Seat change	▲37	▼29	▼5
Popular vote	28,245	23,109	12,191
Percentage	36.2%	29.6%	15.6%
Swing	▲35.9 pp	▼10.6 pp	▼15.7 pp

The 2025 City of Doncaster Council election took place on 1 May 2025 to elect all 55 members of City of Doncaster Council in Doncaster, South Yorkshire, England, alongside other nationwide local elections.

Reform UK gained control of the council from Labour. At the separate mayoral election held on the same day, the incumbent Labour Mayor of Doncaster, Ros Jones, narrowly retained the mayoralty.

== Background ==
At the 2025 election, Reform UK won a majority of seats.

== Council composition ==
After 2021 election		Before 2025 election	
Party	Seats	Party	Seats
Labour	40	Labour	41
Conservative	11	Conservative	11
Mexborough First	3	Mexborough First	2
Edlington and Warmsworth First	1	Edlington and Warmsworth First	1

Changes:

- February 2022: Daniel Barwell (Labour) resigns – by-election held 31 March 2022
- 31 March 2022: Yetunde Elebuibon (Labour) wins by-election
- October 2023: Barry Johnson (Labour) resigns – by-election held 16 November 2023
- 16 November 2023: Ken Guest (Labour) wins by-election
- 8 December 2023: Mexborough First councillor Bev Chapman changes allegiance to the Labour Party.
- 15 May 2024: Jake Kearsley (Labour) resigns – by-election held 4 July 2024
- 4 July 2024: Rob Dennis (Labour) wins by-election

== Summary ==
=== Election result ===
2025 City of Doncaster Council election
Party	Candidates	Seats	Gains	Losses	Net gain/loss	Seats %	Votes %	Votes	+/−
Reform UK	55	37	37	0	+37	67.3	36.2	28,245	+35.9
Labour	55	12	0	-28	-28	21.8	29.6	23,109	-10.6
Conservative	38	6	0	-5	-5	10.9	15.6	12,191	-15.7
Green	24	0	0	0	0	0	8.9	6,961	-4.1
Liberal Democrats	14	0	0	0	0	0	3.4	2,640	+1.1
Independents	15	0	0	-4	-4	0	3.4	2,629	-2.9
TUSC	11	0	0	0	0	0	1.6	1,275	+0.9
Mexborough First	3	0	0	-3	-3	0	1.1	877	-1.4
British Democrats	1	0	0	0	0	0	0.1	111	+0.1

== Results by ward ==
Incumbent councillors are denoted by an asterisk.

=== Adwick-Le-Street and Carcroft ===
Adwick-Le-Street & Carcroft ward (3 seats)
Party	Candidate	Votes	%	±%
Reform UK	Maria Hollingworth	1,588	49.3	N/A
Reform UK	Nicola Brown	1,450	45.0	N/A
Reform UK	Steven Plater	1,435	44.5	N/A
Labour	Sarah Smith (inc)	966	30.0	−24.3
Labour	Debbie Hutchinson (inc)	921	28.6	−25.3
Labour	Tommy Shaw	866	26.9	−24.1
Green	Julie Winter	327	10.1	−1.1
Conservative	Chris Allen	291	9.0	−12.7
Liberal Democrats	Midori Wilkinson	158	4.9	N/A
Independent	Ashley Mulligan	105	3.3	N/A
Turnout		3,224	26.5	+3.98
Registered electors		12,157		
Reform UK gain from Labour		Swing		
Reform UK gain from Labour		Swing		
Reform UK gain from Labour		Swing		

=== Armthorpe ===
Armthorpe ward (3 seats)
Party	Candidate	Votes	%	±%
Reform UK	Christopher Marriott	1,567	45.6	N/A
Labour	Tim Needham (inc)	1,329	38.7	−4.4
Reform UK	Nick Pritchard	1,190	34.6	N/A
Reform UK	Phil Smith	1,072	31.2	N/A
Labour	Emma North	1,004	29.2	−16.9
Labour	Anya Duckitt	998	29.1	−13.9
Conservative	Craig Armstrong	520	15.1	−21.1
Conservative	Wendy Easton-McLellan	418	12.2	−18.8
Green	James Kaya	392	11.4	−6.5
Liberal Democrats	Sara Booth-Card	233	6.8	N/A
Turnout		3,435	31.5	+5.49
Registered electors		10,899		
Reform UK gain from Labour		Swing		
Labour hold		Swing		
Reform UK gain from Labour		Swing		

=== Balby South ===
Balby South
Party	Candidate	Votes	%	±%
Reform UK	Ioan-Emanuel Craciun	950	43.2	N/A
Labour	Sue Farmer	745	33.9	−13.2
Reform UK	James Hart	736	33.5	N/A
Labour	Aimee Dickson	638	29.0	−13.6
Conservative	Thomas Jennions	344	15.6	−20.8
Green	Lynette Chipp	201	9.1	−2.9
Independent	Shannon Gaines	83	3.8	N/A
Independent	Rob Reid	81	3.7	N/A
Turnout		2,200	31.4	+4.77
Registered electors		7,013		
Reform UK gain from Labour		Swing		
Labour hold		Swing		

=== Bentley ===
Bentley
Party	Candidate	Votes	%	±%
Reform UK	Samuel Booth	1,595	44.1	N/A
Reform UK	Rebecca Booth	1,554	43.0	N/A
Labour	James Church (inc)	1,328	36.7	−12.5
Reform UK	Steve Wharton	1,238	34.2	N/A
Labour	Jane Nightingale (inc)	1,137	31.4	−11.2
Labour	Matt Jones	1,131	31.3	−13.4
Conservative	Sandra Bluff	435	12.0	−13.0
Green	James Breen	359	9.9	−5.4
Green	Frank Cooper	280	7.7	−2.1
Liberal Democrats	Giulia Savini	188	5.2	N/A
TUSC	Steven Flint	127	3.5	−3.6
Turnout		3,617	28.3	+5.27
Registered electors		12,801		
Reform UK gain from Labour		Swing		
Reform UK gain from Labour		Swing		
Labour hold		Swing		

=== Bessacarr ===
Bessacarr
Party	Candidate	Votes	%	±%
Conservative	Nick Allen (inc)	1,412	32.1	−11.5
Reform UK	David Carroll	1,405	31.9	N/A
Reform UK	Chris Kidger	1,282	29.1	N/A
Labour	Lee Mulholland	1,214	27.6	−10.6
Reform UK	Aaran Strong	1,173	26.7	N/A
Labour	Sue Knowles	1,108	25.2	−8.1
Conservative	Laura Bluff (inc)	1,091	24.8	−14.2
Labour	Andrew Bosmans	1,029	23.4	−5.5
Conservative	Carol Greenhalgh	889	20.2	−14.5
Liberal Democrats	Andrew Brooke	505	11.5	+5.2
Green	Richard Mallinder	448	10.2	−11.2
TUSC	Stacy Johnson	97	2.2	N/A
Turnout		4,400	38.7	+3.26
Registered electors		11,378		
Conservative hold		Swing		
Reform UK gain from Conservative		Swing		
Reform UK gain from Labour		Swing		

=== Conisbrough ===
Conisbrough
Party	Candidate	Votes	%	±%
Reform UK	William Shaw	1,577	43.3	N/A
Reform UK	Jason Charity	1,544	42.4	N/A
Reform UK	Rachel Reed	1,453	39.9	N/A
Labour	Lani-Mae Ball (inc)	1,379	37.9	−31.4
Labour	Nigel Ball (inc)	1,353	37.2	−31.3
Labour	Dawn Lawrence	1,088	29.9	−20.9
Conservative	Terry Taylor	291	8.0	−11.9
Green	Danny Fielding	237	6.5	−1.8
Liberal Democrats	Dave Lee	169	4.6	N/A
TUSC	Steven Merriman	156	4.3	−3.9
British Democrats	Frank Calladine	111	3.1	N/A
Turnout		3,638	30.5	+5.27
Registered electors		11,942		
Reform UK gain from Labour		Swing		
Reform UK gain from Labour		Swing		
Reform UK gain from Labour		Swing		

=== Edenthorpe & Kirk Sandall ===
Edenthorpe & Kirk Sandall
Party	Candidate	Votes	%	±%
Reform UK	Alexander Jones	1,239	43.2	N/A
Labour	David Nevett (inc)	992	34.6	−8.8
Labour	Andrea Robinson (inc)	946	33.0	−9.8
Reform UK	Ismail Newton	808	28.2	N/A
Conservative	Patrick Musami	335	11.7	22.4
Independent	Paul Bissett	328	11.4	N/A
Green	Frank Sheridan	243	8.5	−5.8
TUSC	Greg Beaumont	69	2.4	N/A
Turnout		2,869	36.5	+4.84
Registered electors		7,865		
Reform UK gain from Labour		Swing		
Labour hold		Swing		

=== Edlington & Warmsworth ===
Edlington & Warmsworth
Party	Candidate	Votes	%	±%
Reform UK	Joan Briggs	1,013	37.6	N/A
Reform UK	Stephen Barnett	986	36.6	N/A
Labour	Phil Cole	901	33.5	−7.8
Labour	Sam Siddall	877	32.6	+2.2
Conservative	Richard Jones	274	10.2	−13.8
Independent	Chris Mitchell	234	8.7	N/A
Independent	Craig Bowker	195	7.2	N/A
Green	Gillian Nixon	136	5.1	−0.5
Liberal Democrats	Joseph Reid	127	4.7	N/A
Turnout		2,693	30.2	+2.45
Registered electors		8,903		
Reform UK gain from Labour		Swing		
Reform UK gain from Edlington and Warmsworth First		Swing		

=== Finningley ===
Finningley
Party	Candidate	Votes	%	±%
Conservative	Jane Cox (inc)	1,896	33.8	−12.5
Conservative	Steve Cox (inc)	1,894	33.7	−9.8
Conservative	Symeon Waller	1,720	30.6	−21.4
Reform UK	Owen Wheatley	1,579	28.1	N/A
Reform UK	Stephane Leclerc	1,555	27.7	N/A
Reform UK	Surjit Singh Duhre	1,347	24.0	N/A
Labour	Katie Smith	1,206	21.5	−5.3
Labour	Robert Grice	1,173	20.9	±0.0
Labour	Anthony Rawlings	1,109	19.8	+1.8
Green	Leanne Gilbride	449	8.0	−8.5
Liberal Democrats	Roger Long	394	7.0	−0.4
Liberal Democrats	Mihai Melenciuc	228	4.1	N/A
Liberal Democrats	Henry Nchendze	195	3.5	N/A
TUSC	Heather Nicholls	133	2.4	N/A
Turnout		5,612	40.0	+5.73
Registered electors		14,036		
Conservative hold		Swing		
Conservative hold		Swing		
Conservative hold		Swing		

=== Hatfield ===
Hatfield
Party	Candidate	Votes	%	±%
Reform UK	Mark Broadhurst	1,733	43.2	+22.6
Reform UK	Nick Smith	1,433	35.8	N/A
Reform UK	Dan Dawson	1,427	35.6	N/A
Labour	Glynis Smith (inc)	1,187	29.6	−3.2
Labour	Fiona Anderson	1,050	26.2	−9.8
Labour	Jude Knight	959	23.9	−9.2
Conservative	James Aitken	823	20.5	−11.5
Conservative	Ethan Bluff	669	16.7	−6.7
Conservative	Hakan Hyusein	439	11.0	−8.3
Independent	James Hart	431	10.8	N/A
Green	Brian Webster	252	6.3	−0.2
Liberal Democrats	Linda Cotton	238	5.9	N/A
Turnout		4,007	32.7	+3.83
Registered electors		12,239		
Reform UK gain from Labour		Swing		
Reform UK gain from Labour		Swing		
Reform UK gain from Labour		Swing		

=== Hexthorpe & Balby North ===
Hexthorpe & Balby North
Party	Candidate	Votes	%	±%
Labour	Glyn Jones (inc)	813	38.3	−15.3
Reform UK	Russ Linley	775	36.5	N/A
Reform UK	Isaiah-John Reasbeck	685	32.3	N/A
Labour	Sophie Liu (inc)	584	27.5	−2.6
Conservative	Clive Jones	278	13.1	−15.2
Green	Angela Curtis	222	10.5	−5.1
Liberal Democrats	Dean Southall	168	7.9	N/A
Turnout		2,121	26.1	+4.05
Registered electors		8,122		
Labour hold		Swing		
Reform UK gain from Labour		Swing		

=== Mexborough ===
Mexborough (3 seats)
Party	Candidate	Votes	%	±%
Reform UK	Anthony Dodds	1,138	38.5	N/A
Reform UK	Brendan Megaw	1,001	33.9	N/A
Reform UK	John Reed	938	31.8	N/A
Mexborough First	Sean Gibbons*	877	29.7	−30.5
Mexborough First	John Beal	795	26.9	−32.1
Mexborough First	Tina Needham	770	26.1	−31.8
Labour	Bev Chapman	768	26.0	−2.7
Labour	Martin Booth	537	18.2	+2.9
Labour	John Avery	486	16.5	+1.5
Green	Keagan Barnes	130	4.4	+0.4
Conservative	Neil Srivastava	80	2.7	−4.4
Turnout		2,953	26.5	+2.61
Registered electors		11,182		
Reform UK gain from Mexborough First		Swing		
Reform UK gain from Mexborough First		Swing		
Reform UK gain from Mexborough First		Swing		

=== Norton & Askern ===
Norton & Askern (3 seats)
Party	Candidate	Votes	%	±%
Reform UK	Frank Jackson	1,968	49.8	N/A
Reform UK	Gerald Squire	1,842	46.6	N/A
Reform UK	Vicky Lawson	1,758	44.5	N/A
Labour	Iris Beech*	1,036	26.2	−14.4
Labour	Austen White*	913	23.1	−18.4
TUSC	Andy Hiles	891	22.5	N/A
Labour	Janet Silcock	831	21.0	−4.3
Conservative	Steven Ratcliffe	617	15.6	−24.7
Conservative	John Russo	462	11.7	−13.1
Green	Vanessa Myatt	379	9.6	−7.1
Liberal Democrats	Adrian McLeay	378	9.6	N/A
Turnout		3,952	34.3	+3
Registered electors		11,554		
Reform UK gain from Labour		Swing		
Reform UK gain from Labour		Swing		
Reform UK gain from Conservative		Swing		

=== Roman Ridge ===
Roman Ridge (2 seats)
Party	Candidate	Votes	%	±%
Reform UK	Howard Rimmer	1,278	42.8	+34.5
Reform UK	Craig Ward	941	31.5	N/A
Labour	Julie Grace*	888	29.8	−6.3
Labour	Leanne Hempshall*	874	29.2	−13.2
Green	Tony Nicholson	619	20.7	+0.4
Green	Paul Garrett	464	15.5	−4.1
Conservative	Ann Martin	217	7.3	−18.7
Conservative	Ben Smith	202	6.8	−8.4
Turnout		2,984	35.6	+6.43
Registered electors		8,439		
Reform UK gain from Labour		Swing		
Reform UK gain from Labour		Swing		

=== Rossington & Bawtry ===
Rossington & Bawtry (3 seats)
Party	Candidate	Votes	%	±%
Labour	Bob Anderson*	2,173	45.8	+0.2
Labour	Ken Guest	1,921	40.5	−10.3
Labour	Lee Sammut	1,406	29.6	−6.3
Reform UK	Gerrard Farmer	1,313	27.7	N/A
Reform UK	Ellis Mohoney	1,251	26.4	N/A
Reform UK	Clive Stone	1,097	23.1	+8.5
Conservative	David Bluff	685	14.4	−7.9
Independent	Mick Taylor	592	12.5	N/A
Conservative	Teresa Glynn	549	11.6	−10.7
Conservative	Reuben Glynn	538	11.3	−3.0
Independent	John Cooke	504	10.6	−18.5
Green	Margaret Garrett	313	6.6	−1.9
Liberal Democrats	Joshua Brignall-Morley	187	3.9	N/A
Independent	Anne Wilkinson	49	1.0	N/A
Turnout		4,747	34.2	+5.25
Registered electors		13,941		
Labour hold		Swing		
Labour hold		Swing		
Labour hold		Swing		

=== Sprotbrough ===
Sprotbrough (2 seats)
Party	Candidate	Votes	%	±%
Reform UK	Oliver Bloor	1,175	34.4	N/A
Conservative	Cynthia Ransome*	990	29.0	−17.8
Reform UK	Simon Wellings	980	28.7	N/A
Conservative	Glenn Bluff*	926	27.1	−7.5
Labour	Michael MacDonald	797	23.3	−7.7
Labour	Kevin Rodgers	680	19.9	−0.1
Green	Fiona Cahill	314	9.2	−7.8
Green	Olivia Alder	301	8.8	−13.0
Turnout		3,415	39.6	+2.85
Registered electors		8,662		
Reform UK gain from Conservative		Swing		
Conservative hold		Swing		

=== Stainforth & Barnby Dun ===
Stainforth & Barnby Dun (2 seats)
Party	Candidate	Votes	%	±%
Reform UK	Karl Hughes	1,014	47.1	N/A
Reform UK	Neil Wood	850	39.4	N/A
Labour	Keith Allsopp	532	24.7	−7.6
Labour	Dan Cosgrove	412	19.1	−4.0
Conservative	Christine Lunney	295	13.7	−15.7
Conservative	Gary Stapleton*	285	13.2	−18.3
Independent	Andy Flynn	221	10.3	N/A
Green	Amy Mack	171	7.9	+0.4
Turnout		2,155	30.6	+1.89
Registered electors		7,107		
Reform UK gain from Labour		Swing		
Reform UK gain from Conservative		Swing		

=== Thorne & Moorends ===
Thorne & Moorends (3 seats)
Party	Candidate	Votes	%	±%
Reform UK	Dave Knight	1,692	45.3	N/A
Reform UK	Kieran Lay	1,528	40.9	N/A
Reform UK	Glyn Whiting	1,439	38.5	N/A
Labour	Susan Durant*	1,407	37.7	−12.0
Labour	Mark Houlbrook*	1,329	35.6	−10.6
Labour	Joe Blackham*	1,120	30.0	−7.3
Conservative	Michael Kirkbride	399	10.7	−18.5
Conservative	Charlotte Smith	352	9.4	−10.9
Conservative	Andrew Smith	347	9.3	−10.3
Green	Diar Davey-Rogerson	253	6.8	−9.4
TUSC	Adam Holgate	127	3.4	N/A
Turnout		3,737	29.1	+4.21
Registered electors		12,919		
Reform UK gain from Labour		Swing		
Reform UK gain from Labour		Swing		
Reform UK gain from Labour		Swing		

=== Tickhill & Wadworth ===
Tickhill & Wadworth (2 seats)
Party	Candidate	Votes	%	±%
Reform UK	Jackie Dudley	1,163	32.7	N/A
Conservative	Martin Greenhalgh*	1,114	31.3	−11.2
Conservative	David Dixon	1,111	31.2	−33.7
Reform UK	Simon Menzies	1,032	29.0	N/A
Labour	Louis Jackson	825	23.2	+3.0
Labour	Laura Vieira	801	22.5	−1.1
Green	Sarah Henton	363	10.2	+2.1
Turnout		3,562	38.4	+2.8
Registered electors		9,314		
Reform UK gain from Conservative		Swing		
Conservative hold		Swing		

=== Town ===
Town (3 seats)
Party	Candidate	Votes	%	±%
Labour	Gemma Cobby*	1,567	39.9	−10.3
Labour	Majid Khan*	1,468	37.4	−3.2
Labour	Rob Dennis	1,433	36.5	−1.6
Reform UK	Steffan Eyre	999	25.4	N/A
Reform UK	Ryan Malee	962	24.5	N/A
Reform UK	Macauley Gibb	948	24.1	N/A
Green	Julie Buckley	719	18.3	−2.3
Conservative	Dene Flannigan	454	11.6	−10.6
Conservative	Helen Simcock	418	10.6	−11.9
Liberal Democrats	Neil Snowdon	273	7.0	−13.6
TUSC	Tosh McDonald	204	5.2	N/A
TUSC	Nikki McDonald	199	5.1	N/A
Independent	Richie Vallance	103	2.6	N/A
TUSC	Maldwyn Perkins	98	2.5	N/A
Independent	Richard Young	89	2.3	N/A
Turnout		3,927	28.7	+2.84
Registered electors		13,719		
Labour hold		Swing		
Labour hold		Swing		
Labour hold		Swing		

=== Wheatley Hills & Intake ===
Wheatley Hills & Intake (3 seats)
Party	Candidate	Votes	%	±%
Reform UK	Guy Aston	1,546	39.6	N/A
Labour Co-op	Jane Kidd*	1,370	35.1	−8.4
Reform UK	Paul Cutts	1,335	34.2	N/A
Reform UK	Simon Bonnett	1,330	34.1	N/A
Labour Co-op	Yetunde Elebuibon	1,171	30.0	−13.8
Labour Co-op	Emma Muddiman-Rawlins*	1,165	29.8	−8.9
Independent	Daniel Barwell*	444	11.4	−32.4
Conservative	Jan Woning	441	11.3	−16.7
Green	Martin Boyd	434	11.1	−0.2
Independent	Tim Brown	383	9.8	N/A
Independent	Miriam Clarke	101	2.6	N/A
Turnout		3,905	29.6	+3.64
Registered electors		13,304		
Reform UK gain from Labour Co-op		Swing		
Labour Co-op hold		Swing		
Reform UK gain from Labour Co-op		Swing		

== Opinion polls ==
=== Seat projections ===
Date(s) conducted	Pollster	Client	Sample size	Area	Lab	Con	Ref	Others
1 – 10 Mar 2025	Electoral Calculus	Daily Telegraph	5,421	GB	13	5	32	5
6 May 2021	2021 local elections		–	–	40	11	0	4

== By-elections ==
=== Bentley ===
Bentley by-election: 21 August 2025
Party	Candidate	Votes	%	±%
Reform UK	Isaiah-John Reasbeck	1,062	43.8	▲4.2
Labour	Matthew Jones	912	37.6	▲4.7
Independent	Jane Nightingale	169	7.0	▲7.0
Conservative	Christine Lunney	121	5.0	▼5.8
Green	Vanessa Aradia	79	3.3	▼5.6
Liberal Democrats	Giulia Savini	39	1.6	▼3.1
TUSC	Andy Hiles	29	1.2	▼1.9
Workers Party	Ahsan Jamil	15	0.6	▲0.6
Majority		150	6.2	N/A
Turnout		2,432	19.1	▼9.2
Registered electors		12,758		
Reform UK hold		Swing	▼0.3	

== See also ==
- Doncaster Metropolitan Borough Council elections
