= 2006 Doncaster Metropolitan Borough Council election =

← 2004	4 May 2006	2007 →

One third of seats (21 of 63) to Doncaster Metropolitan Borough Council 32 seats needed for a majority
	First party	Second party	Third party
Party	Labour	Independent	Conservative
Seats won	9	4	3
Seats after	29	8	9
Seat change	▲2	Steady	Steady
Popular vote	24,457	11,759	14,426
Percentage	34.4%	16.5%	20.3%
Swing	▲3.7%	▲2.9%	▼2.4%
	Fourth party	Fifth party
Party	Liberal Democrats	Community Group
Seats won	3	2
Seats after	11	6
Seat change	▼2	Steady
Popular vote	11,383	4,102
Percentage	16.0%	5.8%
Swing	▼3.4%	▼4.7%
- Map of the 2006 Doncaster council election results. Labour in red, Conservatives in blue, Liberal Democrats in orange, Independent in light grey and Community Group in dark grey.
Majority party before election
No overall control
Majority party after election
No overall control

The 2006 Doncaster Metropolitan Borough Council elections took place on 4 May 2006. One third of the council was up for election, with the council remaining in no overall control. The Labour Party remained the largest party on the council, picking up two seats overall.

== Election result ==
Doncaster local election result 2006
Party	Seats	Gains	Losses	Net gain/loss	Seats %	Votes %	Votes	+/−
Labour	9	3	1	▲2	42.9	34.4	24,457	▲3.7
Independent	4	1	1	Steady	19.0	16.5	11,759	▲2.9
Conservative	3	0	0	Steady	14.3	20.3	14,426	▼2.4
Liberal Democrats	3	0	2	▼2	14.3	16.0	11,383	▼3.4
Community Group	2	1	1	Steady	9.5	5.8	4,102	▼4.7
Green	0	0	0	Steady	0.0	4.8	3,417	▲2.9
English Democrat	0	0	0	Steady	0.0	1.4	973	New
Doncaster Against Demolition	0	0	0	Steady	0.0	0.8	551	New

== Ward results ==
=== Adwick ===
Adwick
Party	Candidate	Votes	%	±%
Labour	John Mounsey	1,960	60.3	
Liberal Democrats	David Farrell	908	28.0	
Conservative	Jonathan Broughton	380	11.7	
Majority		1,052	32.3	
Turnout			30.2	
Labour hold		Swing		

=== Armthorpe ===
Armthorpe
Party	Candidate	Votes	%	±%
Independent	Anthony Brown	1,602	51.1	
Labour	Tony Corden	1,260	40.2	
Conservative	Russell Till	276	8.8	
Majority		342	10.9	
Turnout			32.6	
Independent hold		Swing		

=== Askern Spa ===
Askern Spa
Party	Candidate	Votes	%	±%
Labour	Roselyn Jones	1,527	45.9	
Conservative	Philip Bell	1,160	34.9	
Green	Mary Chipp	349	10.5	
Community Group	Julian Hurley	289	8.7	
Majority		367	11.0	
Turnout			34.2	
Labour hold		Swing		

=== Balby ===
Balby
Party	Candidate	Votes	%	±%
Independent	Garth Oxby	1,325	42.8	
Labour	Dorothy Chamberlain	1,196	38.6	
Conservative	Jane Cox	576	18.6	
Majority		129	4.2	
Turnout			29.6	
Independent gain from Community Group		Swing		

=== Bentley ===
Bentley
Party	Candidate	Votes	%	±%
Labour	Stuart Hardy	1,367	49.0	
Independent	Charles Storey	1,069	38.3	
Conservative	Nicholas Lapish	356	12.8	
Majority		298	10.7	
Turnout			28.9	
Labour hold		Swing		

=== Bessacarr and Cantley ===
Bessacarr and Cantley
Party	Candidate	Votes	%	±%
Liberal Democrats	Eric Tatton-Kelly	2,440	56.4	
Labour	Franks Perks	955	22.1	
Conservative	Raja Akhtar	933	21.6	
Majority		1,485	34.3	
Turnout			41.0	
Liberal Democrats hold		Swing		

=== Central ===
Central
Party	Candidate	Votes	%	±%
Labour	John McHale	1,480	42.9	
Liberal Democrats	Jonathan Snelling	1,271	36.9	
Conservative	Asma Hassan	329	9.5	
Green	Stephen Brandon	254	7.4	
Doncaster Against Demolition	Eric Tetley	115	3.3	
Majority		209	6.0	
Turnout			33.0	
Labour gain from Liberal Democrats		Swing		

=== Conisbrough and Denaby ===
Conisbrough and Denaby
Party	Candidate	Votes	%	±%
Labour	Sandra Holland	1,247	40.4	
Independent	Carol Sellars	915	29.7	
Independent	Michael Cooper	447	14.5	
Liberal Democrats	Patricia Wheatley	286	9.3	
Doncaster Against Demolition	Susan Evans	190	6.2	
Majority		332	10.7	
Turnout			31.2	
Labour hold		Swing		

=== Edenthorpe, Kirk Sandall and Barnby Dun ===
Edenthorpe, Kirk Sandall and Barnby Dun
Party	Candidate	Votes	%	±%
Independent	Michael Maye	2,275	56.1	
Labour	Liz Jeffress	1,153	28.4	
Conservative	James Hart	628	15.5	
Majority		1,122	27.7	
Turnout			38.4	
Independent hold		Swing		

=== Edlington and Warmsworth ===
Edlington and Warmsworth
Party	Candidate	Votes	%	±%
Labour	Elsie Butler	1,345	42.0	
Independent	Raymond Mullis	1,140	35.6	
Conservative	Damian Edwards	448	14.0	
Green	Kim Rolt	273	8.5	
Majority		205	6.4	
Turnout			31.3	
Labour hold		Swing		

=== Finningley ===
Finningley
Party	Candidate	Votes	%	±%
Conservative	Richard Jones	1,832	40.0	
English Democrat	Peter Davies	973	21.2	
Liberal Democrats	Marie Lane	712	15.5	
Labour	Susan Lister	656	14.3	
Green	Adrian Hawley	279	6.1	
Independent	George Sheldon	128	2.8	
Majority		859	18.8	
Turnout			40.9	
Conservative hold		Swing		

=== Great North Road ===
Great North Road
Party	Candidate	Votes	%	±%
Independent	David Hughes	1,260	34.8	
Labour	Terry Rodgers	1,099	30.4	
Conservative	Brian Woodhouse	701	19.4	
Green	Thomas Platt	561	15.5	
Majority		161	4.4	
Turnout			32.7	
Independent hold		Swing		

=== Hatfield ===
Hatfield
Party	Candidate	Votes	%	±%
Community Group	Nigel Hodges	1,228	36.9	
Labour	Linda Curran	1,170	35.2	
Conservative	John Brown	928	27.9	
Majority		58	1.7	
Turnout			34.3	
Community Group gain from Labour		Swing		

=== Mexborough ===
Mexborough
Party	Candidate	Votes	%	±%
Liberal Democrats	Edwin Simpson	1,588	48.3	
Labour	Paula Walford	1,402	42.7	
Green	Suzanne McNaghten	295	9.0	
Majority		186	5.6	
Turnout			30.6	
Liberal Democrats hold		Swing		

=== Rossington ===
Rossington
Party	Candidate	Votes	%	±%
Labour	Barry Johnson	1,373	47.5	
Independent	Terry Wilde	1,042	36.1	
Conservative	Kathleen Beard	473	16.4	
Majority		331	11.4	
Turnout			29.8	
Labour gain from Independent		Swing		

=== Sprotbrough ===
Sprotbrough
Party	Candidate	Votes	%	±%
Conservative	Doreen Woodhouse	1,684	47.1	
Labour	Susan Williams	767	21.4	
Green	Richard Rolt	683	19.1	
Liberal Democrats	Stephen Coddington	442	12.4	
Majority		917	25.7	
Turnout			38.5	
Conservative hold		Swing		

=== Stainforth and Moorends ===
Stainforth and Moorends
Party	Candidate	Votes	%	±%
Labour	Norah Troops	869	34.0	
Community Group	Claire Taylor Hatem	655	25.6	
Independent	Terry Papworth	479	18.7	
Conservative	Martin Drake	479	18.7	
Independent	Rodger Lee	77	3.0	
Majority		214	8.4	
Turnout			27.4	
Labour hold		Swing		

=== Thorne ===
Thorne
Party	Candidate	Votes	%	±%
Community Group	Richard Walker	1,852	56.6	
Labour	Peter Best	880	26.9	
Conservative	James Nelson	539	16.5	
Majority		972	29.7	
Turnout			32.5	
Community Group hold		Swing		

=== Torne Valley ===
Torne Valley
Party	Candidate	Votes	%	±%
Conservative	Patricia Bartlett	1,950	50.2	
Liberal Democrats	Derek Markham	923	23.8	
Labour	Hilary McNamee	678	17.4	
Green	Jamie Gash	257	6.6	
Community Group	Tony Brooks	78	2.0	
Majority		1,027	26.4	
Turnout			39.8	
Conservative hold		Swing		

=== Town Moor ===
Town Moor
Party	Candidate	Votes	%	±%
Liberal Democrats	Kevin Abell	2,052	60.0	
Labour	Rattan Gug	903	26.4	
Green	Darren Robinson	466	13.6	
Majority		1,149	33.6	
Turnout			34.9	
Liberal Democrats hold		Swing		

=== Wheatley ===
Wheatley
Party	Candidate	Votes	%	±%
Labour	Kathleen Hood	1,170	39.9	
Liberal Democrats	Nigel Spouse	761	26.0	
Conservative	Maurice Field	754	25.7	
Doncaster Against Demolition	Lawrence Parramore	246	8.4	
Majority		409	13.9	
Turnout			31.3	
Labour gain from Liberal Democrats		Swing		
