= 2012 Doncaster Metropolitan Borough Council election =

2012 UK local government election

- 3 May 2012

One third (21 of 63) seats to Doncaster Metropolitan Borough Council 32 seats needed for a majority
	First party	Second party	Third party
Party	Labour	Conservative	Liberal Democrats
Seats won	16	3	1
Seat change	▲8	0	▼3
Popular vote	34,603	12,247	5,621
Percentage	50.9%	18.0%	8.3%
Swing	▲21.7%	▼6.8%	▼7.4%
- Map showing the results of the 2012 Doncaster Council elections.
Council control before election
Labour
Council control after election
Labour

The 2012 Doncaster Metropolitan Borough Council election took place on 3 May 2012 to elect one third of Doncaster Metropolitan Borough Council in South Yorkshire, England. This was on the same day as other 2012 United Kingdom local elections.

The Labour Party retained its control of the council with an increased majority after increasing its vote share by 21.7% and gaining three seats from the Liberal Democrats and five from various independents. The Conservatives held the three seats it was defending with a reduced vote share. After the election, the composition of the council was:

- Labour 50
- Conservative 9
- Liberal Democrats 3
- Others 1

== Result ==
Doncaster Metropolitan Borough Council election, 2012
Party	Seats	Gains	Losses	Net gain/loss	Seats %	Votes %	Votes	+/−
Labour	16	8	0	+8		50.9	34,603	+21.7
Conservative	3	0	0	0		18.0	12,247	-6.8
Liberal Democrats	1	0	3	-3		8.3	5,621	-7.4
Community Group	1	0	0	0		2.4	1,618	
Independent	0	0	5	-5		10.2	6,949	
English Democrat	0	0	0	0		7.8	5,276	
UKIP	0	0	0	0		0.9	643	
Green	0	0	0	0		0.8	575	
Democratic Nationalists	0	0	0	0		0.6	410	

== Ward results ==
The results in each ward are shown below. Changes are compared with the previous election in 2008. Spoilt ballots are not included in the below results.

=== Adwick ===
Adwick
Party	Candidate	Votes	%	±%
Labour	Ted Kitchen	2,058	76.2	+24.8
Liberal Democrats	Dave Farrell	358	13.2	−12.6
Conservative	Kerry Wood	286	10.6	−5.2
Majority		1,700	62.9	
Turnout		2,702	25.3	−4.0
Labour hold		Swing		

=== Armthorpe ===
Armthorpe
Party	Candidate	Votes	%	±%
Labour	Sue McGuinness	1,677	52.5	+23.3
Independent	Scott Pickles	1,289	40.4	N/A
Conservative	Chris Allen	226	7.1	−5.9
Majority		388	12.2	
Turnout		3,192	29.2	−2.1
Labour gain from Independent		Swing		

=== Askern Spa ===
Askern Spa
Party	Candidate	Votes	%	±%
Labour	Austen White	2,269	70.4	+38.3
Conservative	Martin Greenhalgh	954	29.6	−0.7
Majority		1,315	40.8	
Turnout		3,223	33.3	−4.6
Labour hold		Swing		

=== Balby ===
Balby
Party	Candidate	Votes	%	±%
Labour	Nuala Fennelly	1,436	45.7	+17.3
Independent	Mark Thompson	1,136	36.2	−7.5
Conservative	Richard Eaton	435	13.8	−2.0
Liberal Democrats	Edwin Simpson	135	4.3	N/A
Majority		300	9.5	
Turnout		3,142	28.3	−3.7
Labour gain from Independent		Swing		

=== Bentley ===
Bentley
Party	Candidate	Votes	%	±%
Labour	Jane Nightingale	1,750	64.5	+26.4
English Democrat	Barbara Hewitt	681	25.1	N/A
Conservative	Alexandra Allen	282	10.4	−6.4
Majority		1,069	39.4	
Turnout		2,713	27.4	−4.1
Labour hold		Swing		

=== Bessacarr & Cantley ===
Bessacarr & Cantley
Party	Candidate	Votes	%	±%
Liberal Democrats	Monty Cuthbert	1,764	42.5	−9.9
Labour	Paul Bissett	1,230	29.6	+15.2
Conservative	Mark Wells	623	15.0	−13.5
English Democrat	Glenn Bluff	535	12.9	N/A
Majority		534	12.9	
Turnout		4,152	36.8	−4.9
Liberal Democrats hold		Swing		

=== Central ===
Central
Party	Candidate	Votes	%	±%
Labour	Glyn Jones	1,957	64.5	+21.6
English Democrat	Howard Dove	533	17.6	N/A
Conservative	Ian Hutchinson	297	9.8	−4.5
Liberal Democrats	Barbara Bell	226	7.5	−25.9
Majority		1,424	47.0	
Turnout		3,033	26.0	−6.5
Labour hold		Swing		

=== Conisbrough & Denaby ===
Conisbrough & Denaby
Party	Candidate	Votes	%	±%
Labour	Christine Mills	2,420	87.3	+26.9
Conservative	Jonathan Broughton	352	12.7	−7.0
Majority		2,068	74.6	
Turnout		2,772	26.8	−3.1
Labour hold		Swing		

=== Edenthorpe, Kirk Sandall & Barnby Dun ===
Edenthorpe, Kirk Sandall & Barnby Dun
Party	Candidate	Votes	%	±%
Labour	Pat Hall	1,409	38.4	+16.4
English Democrat	Keith Hewitt	731	19.9	N/A
Liberal Democrats	Karen Hampson	579	15.8	−39.2
Conservative	Barbara Fletcher	518	14.1	−9.0
Independent	Karl Goodman	437	11.9	N/A
Majority		678	18.5	
Turnout		3,674	34.6	−2.9
Labour gain from Liberal Democrats		Swing		

=== Edlington & Warmsworth ===
Edlington & Warmsworth
Party	Candidate	Votes	%	±%
Labour	Phil Cole	1,830	53.1	+12.7
Independent	Ray Mullis	1,356	39.3	−4.4
Conservative	Liz Jones	261	7.6	−8.3
Majority		474	13.8	
Turnout		3,447	33.2	−1.2
Labour gain from Independent		Swing		

=== Finningley ===
Finningley
Party	Candidate	Votes	%	±%
Conservative	Yvonne Woodcock	1,803	40.3	−8.4
Labour	Thomas Scott-Chambers	1,237	27.7	+15.9
English Democrat	Nigel Berry	1,163	26.0	+4.4
Liberal Democrats	John Brown	270	6.0	−1.9
Majority		566	12.7	
Turnout		4,473	37.3	−4.4
Conservative hold		Swing		

=== Great North Road ===
Great North Road
Party	Candidate	Votes	%	±%
Labour	Debbie Hutchinson	2,378	62.2	+34.5
Conservative	Frank Calladine	643	16.8	−3.8
Green	Stephen Platt	575	15.0	+3.4
Liberal Democrats	John Butterfield	227	5.9	N/A
Majority		1,735	45.4	
Turnout		3,823	32.8	−3.6
Labour gain from Independent		Swing		

=== Hatfield ===
Hatfield
Party	Candidate	Votes	%	±%
Labour	Pat Haith	1,049	32.9	?
English Democrat	Mick Glynn	827	26.0	N/A
Independent	Jessie Credland	791	24.8	−1.4
Conservative	James Hart	343	10.8	−17.6
Community Group	Stewart Rayner	176	5.5	−9.1
Majority		222	7.0	
Turnout		3,186	37.7	+2.6
Labour hold		Swing		

=== Mexborough ===
Mexborough
Party	Candidate	Votes	%	±%
Labour	Tracey Leyland-Jepson	1,577	55.6	+23.1
Independent	Andrew Pickering	687	24.2	N/A
Liberal Democrats	Malcolm Jevons	472	16.7	−38.8
Conservative	Phyllis Calladine	98	3.5	−8.5
Majority		890	31.4	
Turnout		2,834	24.6	−5.9
Labour gain from Liberal Democrats		Swing		

=== Rossington ===
Rossington
Party	Candidate	Votes	%	±%
Labour	Richard Cooper-Holmes	1,581	56.3	+30.5
Independent	Terry Wilde	880	31.3	N/A
Conservative	Kathleen Beard	240	8.5	−5.3
Liberal Democrats	Richard Johnson	108	3.8	N/A
Majority		701	25.0	
Turnout		2,809	28.5	−4.9
Labour gain from Independent		Swing		

=== Sprotbrough ===
Sprotbrough
Party	Candidate	Votes	%	±%
Conservative	Jonathan Wood	1,637	46.6	−7.8
Labour	Peter Millar	1,565	44.5	+26.0
Liberal Democrats	Diana Simpson	312	8.9	N/A
Majority		72	2.0	
Turnout		3,514	37.9	−2.2
Conservative hold		Swing		

=== Stainforth & Moorends ===
Stainforth & Moorends
Party	Candidate	Votes	%	±%
Labour	Ken Keegan	1,627	65.8	+30.1
Conservative	Martin Drake	436	17.6	−4.6
Democratic Nationalists	Dave Owen	410	16.6	New
Majority		1,191	48.2	
Turnout		2,473	25.4	−3.4
Labour hold		Swing		

=== Thorne ===
Thorne
Party	Candidate	Votes	%	±%
Community Group	Martin Williams	1,442	46.7	−3.6
Labour	Susan Durant	1,176	38.1	+24.8
Conservative	Richard Walker	467	15.1	+1.1
Majority		266	8.6	
Turnout		3,085	28.8	−5.7
Community Group hold		Swing		

=== Torne Valley ===
Torne Valley
Party	Candidate	Votes	%	±%
Conservative	Bob Ford	1,563	42.7	−8.8
Labour	Shane McAleavey	1,112	30.4	+16.0
UKIP	Rebecca Walters	643	17.6	+10.9
Liberal Democrats	David Adgar	339	9.3	−3.7
Majority		451	12.3	
Turnout		3,657	37.1	−5.5
Conservative hold		Swing		

=== Town Moor ===
Town Moor
Party	Candidate	Votes	%	±%
Labour	Paul Wray	1,569	49.0	+20.5
Liberal Democrats	Cliff Hampson	831	25.9	−12.5
Conservative	Stephen Cox	432	13.5	−5.6
Independent	Michelle Goodman	373	11.6	N/A
Majority		738	23.0	
Turnout		3,205	31.4	−3.3
Labour gain from Liberal Democrats		Swing		

=== Wheatley ===
Wheatley
Party	Candidate	Votes	%	±%
Labour	Eva Hughes	1,696	59.4	+22.0
English Democrat	Roy Penketh	806	28.3	N/A
Conservative	Malcolm Knight	351	12.3	−7.6
Majority		890	31.2	
Turnout		2,853	29.1	−4.4
Labour hold		Swing		

== Mayoral referendum ==
Alongside the council election, and election took place to decide whether to have an elected mayor in Doncaster. Doncaster was one of the two cities on the night to vote 'Yes'.

Doncaster Mayoral referendum 2012
Choice	Votes	%
For	42,196	61.98
Against	25,879	38.02
Total	68,075	100.00
Registered voters/turnout		30.5
