= Mexborough (ward) =

Electoral ward in Doncaster, England

Coordinates: 53.4936°N 1.2910°W

- Ward
- Area: 6.89 km^{2} (2.66 sq mi)
- Population: 15,244 (2011)
  - Density: 2,212/km^{2} (5,730/sq mi)
- Metropolitan borough: Doncaster
- Metropolitan county: South Yorkshire
- Region: Yorkshire and the Humber
- Country: England
- Sovereign state: United Kingdom
- UK Parliament: Doncaster North
- Councillors: Sean Gibbons (Mexborough First); Bev Chapman (Mexborough First); Andy Pickering (Mexborough First)

Mexborough is one of 21 electoral wards in the Metropolitan Borough of Doncaster, South Yorkshire, England, covering the town of Mexborough. It forms part of the Doncaster North parliamentary constituency. Its three councillors are members of the localist party Mexborough First.
