= 2017 Doncaster Metropolitan Borough Council election =

2017 UK local government election

- 4 May 2017

All 55 seats to Doncaster Metropolitan Borough Council 28 seats needed for a majority
	First party	Second party
Party	Labour	Conservative
Last election	41	8
Seats won	43	7
Seat change	▲2	▼1
Popular vote	28,873	18,993
Percentage	37.5%	24.7%
	Third party	Fourth party
Party	Mexborough First	Independent
Last election	3	1
Seats won	3	2
Seat change	Steady	▲1
Popular vote	2,320	6,039
Percentage	3.0%	7.8%
- Map showing the results of the 2017 Doncaster Council elections.
Council control before election
Labour
Council control after election
Labour

The 2017 Doncaster Metropolitan Borough Council election took place on 4 May 2017 as part of the 2017 local elections in the United Kingdom. The election of the Mayor of Doncaster also took place on the same day. All 55 councillors were elected from 21 wards which returned either two or three councillors each by first-past-the-post voting for a four-year term of office.

The election resulted in the Labour Party retaining control of the Council, with an increased majority after gaining two seats from UKIP.

== Results summary ==
Doncaster Metropolitan Borough Council election, 2017
Party	Candidates	Seats	Gains	Losses	Net gain/loss	Seats %	Votes %	Votes	+/−
Labour	{{{candidates}}}	43	2	0	▲2		37.5	28,873	
Conservative	{{{candidates}}}	7	0	1	▼1		24.7	18,993	
Mexborough First	{{{candidates}}}	3	0	0	Steady		3.0	2,320	
Independent	{{{candidates}}}	2	1	0	▲1		7.8	6,039	
UKIP	{{{candidates}}}	0	0	2	▼2		14.3	11,008	
Yorkshire	{{{candidates}}}	0	0	0	Steady		5.3	4,102	
Green	{{{candidates}}}	0	0	0	Steady		3.9	2,988	
Community Group	{{{candidates}}}	0	0	0	Steady		1.5	1,147	
TUSC	{{{candidates}}}	0	0	0	Steady		1.1	848	
Liberal Democrats	{{{candidates}}}	0	0	0	Steady		1.0	736	

== Council composition ==
Following the last election in 2015, the composition of the council was:

↓
41	8	3	2	1
Labour	Conservative	MF	U	I

After the election, the composition of the council was:

43	7	3	2
Labour	Conservative	MF	I

MF - Mexborough First
I - Independent
U - UKIP

== Mayoral election ==
Doncaster Mayoral Election 2017
Party	Candidate	1st round		2nd round			1st round votesTransfer votes, 2nd round
Party	Candidate	Total	Of round	Transfers	Total	Of round	1st round votesTransfer votes, 2nd round
Labour	Ros Jones	32,631	50.9%				
Conservative	George Jabbour	13,575	21.2%				
UKIP	Brian Whitmore	7,764	12.1%				
Independent	Eddie Todd	5,344	8.3%				
Yorkshire	Chris Whitwood	3,235	5.0%				
TUSC	Steve Williams	1,531	2.4%				
Majority							
Turnout		64,080					
Labour hold							

== Ward results ==
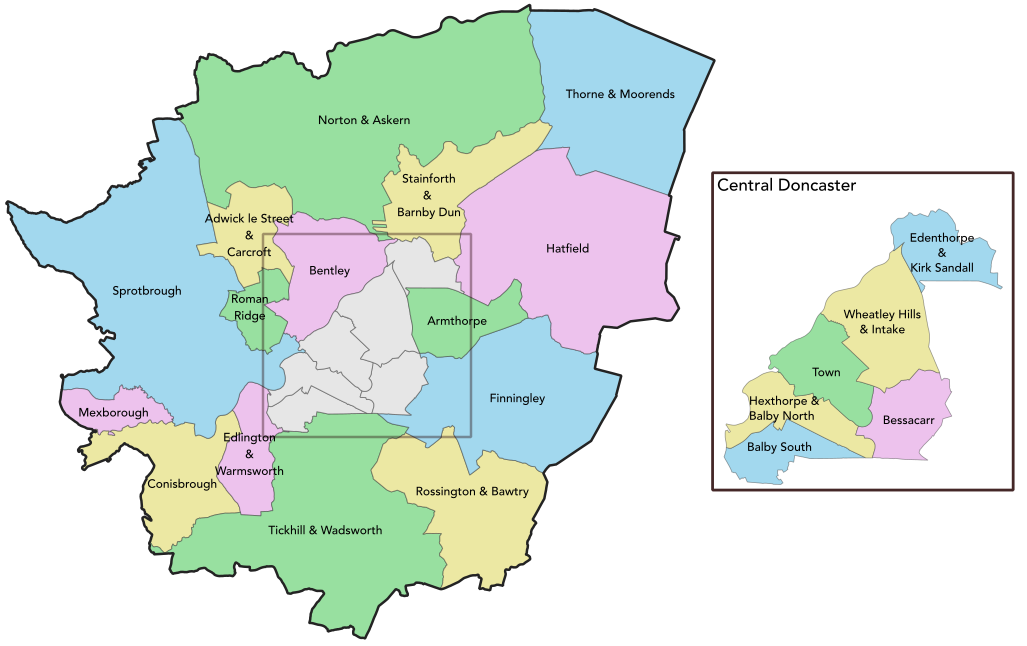
Map of electoral wards in Doncaster.

=== Adwick-Le-Street and Carcroft ===
Adwick-Le-Street and Carcroft (3)
Party	Candidate	Votes	%	±%
Labour	David Hughes	1,574	54.4	+9.7
Labour	John Mounsey	1,553	53.6	+6.1
Labour	Rachel Hodson	1,361	47.0	+11.6
Yorkshire	Charles Bridges	678	23.4	New
UKIP	Frank Calladine	655	22.6	−6.4
Conservative	Terry Taylor	472	16.3	+4.6
Turnout			25.2%	−28.5

=== Armthorpe ===
Armthorpe (3)
Party	Candidate	Votes	%	±%
Labour	Tony Corden	1,479	51.4	+4.6
Labour	Chris McGuinness	1,336	46.4	+3.3
Labour	Sue McGuinness	1,314	45.6	+4.4
UKIP	Nigel Berry	1,045	36.3	−1.9
Conservative	Margaret Beard	787	27.3	+6.2
UKIP	Kevin Michael Abell	767	26.6	New
Green	Mark Gray	328	11.4	+1.2
Turnout			26.6%	−27.9

=== Balby South ===
Balby South (2)
Party	Candidate	Votes	%	±%
Labour	Nuala Mary Fennelly	1,007	48.8	+12.1
Labour	John Patrick Joseph Healy	792	38.4	−9.8
Conservative	John Thomas Papworth	678	32.8	+9.4
UKIP	James Anthony Cotterill	530	25.7	−10.1
Green	Ash Ingram	208	10.1	+2.9
Turnout			28.1%	−24.3

=== Bentley ===
Bentley (3)
Party	Candidate	Votes	%	±%
Labour	Charlie Hogarth	1,665	50.8	+6.5
Labour	Bill Mordue	1,618	49.4	+2.4
Labour	Jane Nightingale	1,511	46.1	+2.9
UKIP	Louise Margaret Emery	832	25.4	−6.6
Conservative	Brian Woodhouse	803	24.5	+6.3
Green	Amy Louise Baker	398	12.1	+1.2
Green	Tony Nicholson	300	9.2	New
Green	Dawn Longley	267	8.2	New
TUSC	Jordan James Lucas	169	5.2	New
TUSC	Steven Flint	167	5.1	−1.9
Turnout		7,730	26.0%	−25.1

=== Bessacarr ===
Bessacarr (3)
Party	Candidate	Votes	%	±%
Conservative	Nick Allen	1,448	36.9	+10.8
Labour	Neil Gethin	1,217	31.0	+2.6
Labour	Majid Khan	1,172	29.8	+3.1
Labour	Diane Jones	1,161	29.6	+4.6
Conservative	Carol Greenhalgh	1,097	27.9	New
Independent	Monty Cuthbert	1,044	26.6	+7.7
Conservative	Leon Sean French	1,040	26.5	+6.1
Independent	Paul Coddington	838	21.3	−3.5
UKIP	Paul Alexander Carr Pickering	542	13.8	−7.8
Liberal Democrats	Roger Leonard Long	386	9.8	−3.4
Liberal Democrats	Matthew Thomas Hague	295	7.5	−4.9
Green	James Michael Chatterley	212	5.4	−3.4
Green	Veronica Jane Maxwell	156	4.0	New
Turnout		10,608	34.4%	−28.2

=== Conisbrough ===
Conisbrough (3)
Party	Candidate	Votes	%	±%
Labour	Nigel Ball	1,685	55.5	+0.3
Labour	Ian Pearson	1,545	50.9	+5.7
Labour	Lani-Mae Ball	1,523	50.2	+12.7
UKIP	William Brooke Shaw	750	24.7	+2.3
Yorkshire	Stevie Manion	716	23.6	New
Conservative	Rachel French	676	22.3	+10.4
Turnout		6,895	25.3%	−31.4

=== Edenthorpe & Kirk Sandall ===
Edenthorpe & Kirk Sandall (2)
Party	Candidate	Votes	%	±%
Labour	David Andrew Nevett	1,156	43.6	+3.3
Labour	Andrea Robinson	1,039	39.2	+2.6
UKIP	Paul Bissett	713	26.9	−7.2
Conservative	Cliff Hampson	698	26.3	+6.2
Conservative	Karen Hampson	660	24.9	+13.3
UKIP	Harry Palmer	544	20.5	−8.6
Turnout		4,810	33.7%	−27.4

=== Edlington & Warmsworth ===
Edlington & Warmsworth (2)
Party	Candidate	Votes	%	±%
Labour	Tina Reid	1,292	56.2	+8.3
Labour	Phil Cole	1,168	50.8	−1.0
Conservative	Liz Jones	679	29.5	+13.1
UKIP	Robert Noel Middleton	534	23.2	−5.5
Turnout		3,673	27.4%	−31.1

=== Finningley ===
Finningley (3)
Party	Candidate	Votes	%	±%
Conservative	Jane Margaret Cox	2,579	61.3	+25.6
Conservative	Stephen Leslie Cox	2,385	56.7	+24.0
Conservative	Allan Jones	2,351	55.9	+22.5
Labour	Tony Bryan	1,185	28.2	+0.6
Labour	Sandra Mary Holland	1,173	27.9	+0.9
Labour	Phil Docherty	1,042	24.8	+4.2
TUSC	Owen Harris-Evans	315	7.5	+4.3
Turnout		11,030	33.0%	−33.2

=== Hatfield ===
Hatfield (3)
Party	Candidate	Votes	%	±%
Labour	Linda Mary Curran	1,297	37.7	−3.2
Labour	Duncan Charles Anderson	1,195	34.7	−1.5
Labour	Derek William Smith	1,097	31.9	+2.8
UKIP	Mick Glynn	1,053	30.6	−5.4
Conservative	James Vincent Hart	878	25.5	+4.1
Independent	Jessie Jamieson Credland	864	25.1	−11.0
UKIP	Keith Jacques	688	20.0	−16.1
Independent	Bill Morrison	631	18.3	New
UKIP	Deborah Cotterill	518	15.0	−11.5
Independent	Anne Frances Rutherford	392	11.4	−15.1
Turnout		8,613	29.9%	−28.2

=== Hexthorpe & Balby North ===
Hexthorpe & Balby North (2)
Party	Candidate	Votes	%	±%
Labour	Glyn Allen Jones	1,141	59.5	+5.9
Labour	Sue Wilkinson	873	45.5	−0.3
UKIP	John David Cotterill	532	27.7	−11.3
Conservative	Ann Nadin Martin	433	22.6	New
Turnout		2,979	24.9%	−24.3

=== Mexborough ===
Mexborough (3)
Party	Candidate	Votes	%	±%
Mexborough First	Andy Pickering	2,320	72.0	+24.6
Mexborough First	Sean Michael Gibbons	2,252	69.9	+22.6
Mexborough First	Bev Chapman	2,083	64.7	+26.6
Labour	Sue Phillips	722	22.4	−6.4
Labour	Tracey Joan Leyland-Jepson	682	21.2	−5.4
Labour	Rob Reid	397	12.3	−9.2
Conservative	Barbara Fletcher	163	5.1	New
Turnout		8,619	27.6%	−24.7

=== Norton & Askern ===
Norton & Askern (3)
Party	Candidate	Votes	%	±%
Labour	Iris Beech	1,651	46.6	+7.3
Labour	Austen William White	1,586	44.8	+7.4
Labour	John Anthony Gilliver	1,470	41.5	+0.7
Conservative	Carolyn Taylor	1,088	30.7	+2.3
Yorkshire	Jacob Barker	785	22.2	New
Independent	Frank Jackson	763	21.5	New
UKIP	Charles Roger Morris	742	20.9	−12.3
Turnout		8,085	31.8%	−30.3

=== Roman Ridge ===
Roman Ridge (2)
Party	Candidate	Votes	%	±%
Labour	Pat Haith	1,376	53.9	+13.7
Labour	Kevin Terence Rodgers	1,205	47.2	+7.0
Conservative	Doreen Woodhouse	814	31.9	+13.8
Green	Christine Florence Platt	387	15.2	+9.4
Green	Stephen Platt	382	15.0	+5.1
Turnout		4,164	30.2%	−30

=== Rossington & Bawtry ===
Rossington & Bawtry (3)
Party	Candidate	Votes	%	±%
Labour	Rachael Blake	1,823	48.7	+12.7
Independent	John Nolan Cooke	1,645	43.9	+13.6
Labour	Mick Cooper	1,497	40.0	+16.4
Labour	Kevin Robert Fennelly	1,368	36.5	+14.7
Conservative	Ross Lawrence David Atkinson	1,039	27.8	+4.5
UKIP	Clive Graham Stone	937	25.0	−0.6
TUSC	Luke Michael Jones	159	4.2	New
Turnout		8,468	28.6%	−29.5

=== Sprotbrough ===
Sprotbrough (2)
Party	Candidate	Votes	%	±%
Conservative	Cynthia Anne Ransome	1,704	53.7	+15.3
Conservative	Jonathan Blundell Wood	1,376	43.4	+7.4
Labour	David Holland	1,141	36.0	+4.6
Labour	Craig Bernard Sahman	772	24.3	−2.9
Green	Fiona Dorothy Patricia Cahill	510	16.1	+4.4
Turnout		5,503	35.7%	−31.1

=== Stainforth & Barnby Dun ===
Stainforth & Barnby Dun (2)
Party	Candidate	Votes	%	±%
Labour	Ken Keegan	1,004	50.4	+6.8
Labour	George Derx	728	36.5	+4.2
Conservative	Christine Yvonne Allen	710	35.6	+15.1
UKIP	John Waggitt	673	33.8	+7.4
Turnout		3,115	27.8%	−28.3

=== Thorne & Moorends ===
Thorne & Moorends (3)
Party	Candidate	Votes	%	±%
Labour	Susan Jane Durant	2,019	52.9	+16.6
Labour	Mark Stuart Houlbrook	1,890	49.5	+15.6
Labour	Joe Blackham	1,797	47.1	+12.6
Community Group	Martin Williams	1,147	30.1	+0.5
Community Group	Tony Brookes	982	25.7	+8.7
Community Group	Lee Dudgeon	735	19.3	+6.0
UKIP	Kim Parkinson	583	15.3	−11.5
Conservative	Keith Oades	469	12.3	−2.3
Independent	Karen Lesley Mundin	374	9.8	New
TUSC	Mary Jackson	205	5.4	+2.0
Turnout		10,201	29.8%	−24.5

=== Tickhill & Wadworth ===
Tickhill & Wadworth (2)
Party	Candidate	Votes	%	±%
Independent	Nigel John Cannings	1,349	44.6	+19.2
Conservative	Martin Damian Greenhalgh	954	31.5	+1.6
Conservative	Alan Smith	821	27.1	−3.5
Labour	Sue Farmer	722	23.9	−3.2
Labour	Bob Johnson	641	21.2	−3.8
Liberal Democrats	Ian Michael Smith	350	11.6	New
Green	Kay Goddard	308	10.2	New
Turnout		5,145	35.6%	−31.7

=== Town ===
Town (3)
Party	Candidate	Votes	%	±%
Labour	John McHale	1,818	49.8	+6.6
Labour	Nikki McDonald	1,667	45.6	+2.8
Labour	Dave Shaw	1,603	43.9	+1.8
Yorkshire	Chris Whitwood	1,195	32.7	New
Conservative	Guy Aston	1,003	27.4	+6.2
Green	Laura Jane Vieira	637	17.4	+1.6
Majority		408	11.2	
Turnout			29.7	−22.1
Labour hold		Swing		
Labour hold		Swing		
Labour hold		Swing		

=== Wheatley Hills & Intake ===
Wheatley Hills & Intake (3)
Party	Candidate	Votes	%	±%
Labour	Eva Theresa Hughes	1,899	54.6	+11.5
Labour	Jane Kidd	1,767	50.8	+9.1
Labour	Paul Wray	1,531	44.0	+4.4
Conservative	Neil Saran Srivastava	918	26.4	+9.9
UKIP	Roy John Penketh	887	25.5	−4.1
Yorkshire	Gareth Shanks	728	20.9	New
Turnout		7,730	27.2%	−25.2

== Changes 2017–2021 ==
- June 2019: Independent councillor Nigel Cannings joined the Conservative Group.
- October 2019: Labour councillor Tina Reid resigned from the Labour Group and joined the Mexborough First Group.
- By May 2021, Tina Reid was standing as an Independent candidate, after having joined the Mexborough First Group in 2019; the date and circumstances of the later change are not established.
- August 2020: Labour councillor George Derx joined the Yorkshire Party.
- March 2021: Conservative councillor Jonathan Wood joined the Green Party.
- By the 2021 election, Ken Keegan was no longer listed with a party description, although he had been listed as a Labour councillor in 2020; the precise date and nature of this change have not been established.
