= 2021 Doncaster Metropolitan Borough Council election =

2021 UK local government election

- 6 May 2021

All 55 seats to Doncaster Metropolitan Borough Council 28 seats needed for a majority
| | First party | Second party | Third party |
|---|---|---|---|
| Party | Labour | Conservative | Mexborough First |
| Last election | 43 seats | 7 seats | 3 seats |
| Seats before | 39 | 7 | 4 |
| Seats won | 40 | 11 | 3 |
| Seat change | ▼3 | ▲4 | Steady |
| Popular vote | 26,986 | 21,015 | 1,673 |
| Percentage | 40.2% | 31.3% | 2.5% |
| Swing | ▲2.7pp | ▲6.7pp | ▼0.5pp |
- Map showing the results of the 2021 Doncaster Metropolitan Borough Council election.
Council control before election
Labour
Council control after election
Labour

The 2021 Doncaster Metropolitan Borough Council election took place on 6 May 2021 as part of the 2021 local elections in the United Kingdom. All 55 councillors were elected from 21 wards which return either two or three councillors each by first-past-the-post voting for a four-year term of office.

The election of the Mayor of Doncaster also took place on the same day.

== Results summary ==
Doncaster Metropolitan Borough Council election, 2021
| Party | Candidates | Seats | Gains | Losses | Net gain/loss | Seats % | Votes % | Votes | +/− |
|---|---|---|---|---|---|---|---|---|---|
| Labour | 55 | 40 | 0 | 3 | ▼3 | 72.7 | 40.2 | 26,986 | ▲2.7 |
| Conservative | 54 | 11 | 4 | 0 | ▲4 | 20.0 | 31.3 | 21,015 | ▲6.7 |
| Green | 27 | 0 | 0 | 0 | Steady | 0.0 | 13.0 | 8,712 | ▲9.1 |
| Independent | 9 | 0 | 0 | 2 | ▼2 | 0.0 | 6.3 | 4,255 | ▼1.5 |
| Mexborough First | 3 | 3 | 0 | 0 | Steady | 5.5 | 2.5 | 1,673 | ▼0.5 |
| Liberal Democrats | 6 | 0 | 0 | 0 | Steady | 0.0 | 2.3 | 1,548 | ▲1.3 |
| Yorkshire | 4 | 0 | 0 | 0 | Steady | 0.0 | 2.1 | 1,382 | ▼3.2 |
| Edlington and Warmsworth First | 2 | 1 | 1 | 0 | ▲1 | 1.8 | 1.2 | 778 | ▲1.2 |
| TUSC | 2 | 0 | 0 | 0 | Steady | 0.0 | 0.7 | 461 | ▼0.4 |
| Reform | 1 | 0 | 0 | 0 | Steady | 0.0 | 0.3 | 207 | ▲0.3 |
| SDP | 1 | 0 | 0 | 0 | Steady | 0.0 | 0.1 | 100 | ▲0.1 |
| UKIP | 0 | 0 | 0 | 0 | Steady | 0.0 | 0.1 | – | ▼14.3 |

== Council composition ==
Following the last election in 2017, the composition of the council was:

↓
| 43 | 7 | 3 | 2 |
| Labour | Conservative | MF | I |

Immediately before the election, the council's composition was 39 Labour, 7 Conservative, 4 Mexborough First, 3 Independent, 1 Green and 1 Yorkshire Party councillor.

After the election, the composition of the council was:

↓
| 40 | 11 | 3 | 1 |
| Labour | Conservative | MF | E |

MF - Mexborough First
I - Independent
E - Edlington and Warmsworth First

== Wards ==
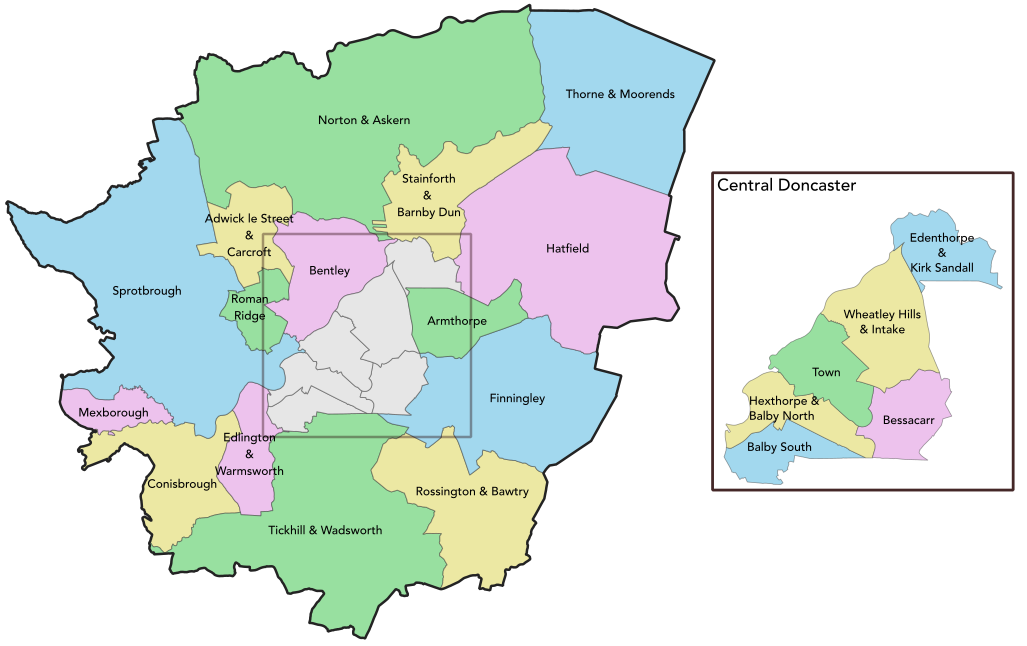
Map of the electoral wards of Doncaster.

Doncaster is divided into 21 wards for electoral purposes with each ward electing either two or three councillors. The number of councillors elected by ward is shown in the table below.

| Ward | Councillors | Prior to election |
|---|---|---|
| Adwick-Le-Street and Carcroft | 3 | 3x Labour |
| Armthorpe | 3 | 3x Labour |
| Balby South | 2 | 2x Labour |
| Bentley | 3 | 3x Labour |
| Bessacarr | 3 | 2x Conservative, 1x Labour |
| Conisbrough | 3 | 3x Labour |
| Edenthorpe & Kirk Sandall | 2 | 2x Labour |
| Edlington & Warmsworth | 2 | 2x Labour |
| Finningley | 3 | 3x Conservative |
| Hatfield | 3 | 3x Labour |
| Hexthorpe & Balby North | 2 | 2x Labour |
| Mexborough | 3 | 3x Mexborough First |
| Norton & Askern | 3 | 2x Labour, 1x Conservative |
| Roman Ridge | 2 | 2x Labour |
| Rossington & Bawtry | 3 | 2x Labour, 1x Independent |
| Sprotbrough | 2 | 2x Conservative |
| Stainforth & Barnby Dun | 2 | 1x Labour, 1x Conservative |
| Thorne & Moorends | 3 | 3x Labour |
| Tickhill & Wadworth | 2 | 1x Independent, 1x Conservative |
| Town | 3 | 3x Labour |
| Wheatley Hills & Intake | 3 | 3x Labour |

== Results by ward ==
Incumbent councillors are denoted by an asterisk. The complete ward results, including candidate affiliations, votes, rejected ballots and turnout, are published by the City of Doncaster Council.

=== Adwick-Le-Street and Carcroft ===
Adwick-Le-Street and Carcroft (3 seats)
| Party | Candidate | Votes | % | ±% |
|---|---|---|---|---|
| Labour | Sarah Diane Smith | 1,467 | 54.3 | −0.1 |
| Labour | Debbie Hutchinson | 1,457 | 53.9 | +6.9 |
| Labour | John Mounsey* | 1,379 | 51.0 | −2.6 |
| Conservative | Peter John Ransome | 586 | 21.7 | +5.4 |
| Conservative | Charles Terence John Bluff | 532 | 19.7 | New |
| Conservative | Kevin Kerrigan | 472 | 17.5 | New |
| Green | Vanessa Aradia Myatt | 304 | 11.2 | New |
| Turnout | | 2,703 | 22.98 | −2.22 |
| Labour hold | | Swing | | |
| Labour hold | | Swing | | |
| Labour hold | | Swing | | |

=== Armthorpe ===
Armthorpe (3 seats)
| Party | Candidate | Votes | % | ±% |
|---|---|---|---|---|
| Labour | Aimee Louise Dickson | 1,306 | 46.1 | −5.3 |
| Labour | Tim Needham | 1,219 | 43.1 | −3.3 |
| Labour | Sue Knowles | 1,216 | 43.0 | −2.6 |
| Conservative | Kathleen Margaret Beard | 1,026 | 36.2 | +8.9 |
| Conservative | Ann Nadin Martin | 878 | 31.0 | New |
| Green | Mark Gray | 507 | 17.9 | +6.5 |
| Conservative | Janet Sanderson | 427 | 15.1 | New |
| Turnout | | 2,831 | 26.01 | −0.59 |
| Labour hold | | Swing | | |
| Labour hold | | Swing | | |
| Labour hold | | Swing | | |

=== Balby South ===
Balby South (2 seats)
| Party | Candidate | Votes | % | ±% |
|---|---|---|---|---|
| Labour | John Patrick Joseph Healy* | 895 | 47.1 | +8.7 |
| Labour | Tracey Ann Moran | 811 | 42.6 | −6.2 |
| Conservative | Susan Davies | 693 | 36.4 | New |
| Conservative | John Thomas Papworth | 431 | 22.7 | −10.1 |
| Green | Lynette Chipp | 228 | 12.0 | +1.9 |
| Turnout | | 1,902 | 26.63 | −1.47 |
| Labour hold | | Swing | | |
| Labour hold | | Swing | | |

=== Bentley ===
Bentley (3 seats)
| Party | Candidate | Votes | % | ±% |
|---|---|---|---|---|
| Labour | James Vernon Church | 1,461 | 49.2 | −0.2 |
| Labour | Charlie Hogarth* | 1,327 | 44.7 | −6.1 |
| Labour | Jane Nightingale* | 1,265 | 42.6 | −3.5 |
| Conservative | Louise Margaret Emery | 744 | 25.0 | −0.4 |
| Conservative | Peter Anthony Ellison | 741 | 24.9 | +0.4 |
| Conservative | Dave Glover | 713 | 24.0 | New |
| Green | Dawn Longley | 454 | 15.3 | +7.1 |
| Green | Michelle Elise Newton-Carline | 291 | 9.8 | −2.3 |
| TUSC | Scott Middleton | 210 | 7.1 | +1.9 |
| Turnout | | 2,972 | 23.03 | −2.97 |
| Labour hold | | Swing | | |
| Labour hold | | Swing | | |
| Labour hold | | Swing | | |

=== Bessacarr ===
Bessacarr (3 seats)
| Party | Candidate | Votes | % | ±% |
|---|---|---|---|---|
| Conservative | Nick Allen* | 1,808 | 43.6 | +6.7 |
| Conservative | Laura Samantha Bluff | 1,615 | 39.0 | +11.1 |
| Labour | Majid Khan* | 1,583 | 38.2 | +8.4 |
| Conservative | James Paul Goff | 1,437 | 34.7 | +8.2 |
| Labour | Neil Gethin* | 1,380 | 33.3 | +2.3 |
| Labour | Lauren Barbara Hogg | 1,199 | 28.9 | −0.7 |
| Green | Monty Cuthbert | 885 | 21.4 | +16.0 |
| Green | Veronica Jane Maxwell | 386 | 9.3 | +5.3 |
| Liberal Democrats | Giulia Savini | 263 | 6.3 | −3.5 |
| Turnout | | 4,143 | 35.44 | +1.04 |
| Conservative hold | | Swing | | |
| Conservative gain from Labour | | Swing | | |
| Labour hold | | Swing | | |

=== Conisbrough ===
Conisbrough (3 seats)
| Party | Candidate | Votes | % | ±% |
|---|---|---|---|---|
| Labour | Lani-Mae Ball* | 2,126 | 69.3 | +19.1 |
| Labour | Nigel Ball* | 2,102 | 68.5 | +13.0 |
| Labour | Ian Pearson* | 1,560 | 50.8 | −0.1 |
| Conservative | Christine Yvonne Allen | 610 | 19.9 | −2.4 |
| Conservative | Jacqueline Isaacs | 403 | 13.1 | New |
| Green | Matthew Grant Wood | 256 | 8.3 | New |
| TUSC | Lee Trow | 251 | 8.2 | New |
| Conservative | Doreen Woodhouse | 167 | 5.4 | New |
| Turnout | | 3,069 | 25.23 | −0.07 |
| Labour hold | | Swing | | |
| Labour hold | | Swing | | |
| Labour hold | | Swing | | |

=== Edenthorpe & Kirk Sandall ===
Edenthorpe & Kirk Sandall (2 seats)
| Party | Candidate | Votes | % | ±% |
|---|---|---|---|---|
| Labour | David Andrew Nevett* | 1,078 | 43.4 | −0.2 |
| Labour | Andrea Robinson* | 1,065 | 42.8 | +3.6 |
| Conservative | Jason Colin Carruthers | 848 | 34.1 | +7.8 |
| Conservative | Julia Elizabeth Gibbons | 810 | 32.6 | +7.7 |
| Green | Fiona Wilson | 355 | 14.3 | New |
| Liberal Democrats | Kieron Anthony Franks | 149 | 6.0 | New |
| Turnout | | 2,486 | 31.66 | −2.04 |
| Labour hold | | Swing | | |
| Labour hold | | Swing | | |

=== Edlington & Warmsworth ===
Edlington & Warmsworth (2 seats)
| Party | Candidate | Votes | % | ±% |
|---|---|---|---|---|
| Labour | Phil Cole* | 1,002 | 41.3 | −9.5 |
| Edlington and Warmsworth First | Rob Reid | 778 | 32.0 | New |
| Labour | Kirsty Lenham | 739 | 30.4 | −25.8 |
| Edlington and Warmsworth First | Keri Anderson | 666 | 27.4 | New |
| Conservative | Joe George | 583 | 24.0 | −5.5 |
| Conservative | Carol Greenhalgh | 386 | 15.9 | New |
| Green | Toby William Crane | 137 | 5.6 | New |
| Turnout | | 2,429 | 27.75 | +0.35 |
| Labour hold | | Swing | | |
| Edlington and Warmsworth First gain from Labour | | | | |

=== Finningley ===
Finningley (3 seats)
| Party | Candidate | Votes | % | ±% |
|---|---|---|---|---|
| Conservative | Allan Jones* | 2,458 | 52.0 | −3.9 |
| Conservative | Jane Margaret Cox* | 2,188 | 46.3 | −15.0 |
| Conservative | Steve Cox* | 2,056 | 43.5 | −13.2 |
| Labour | Sue Lister | 1,267 | 26.8 | −1.4 |
| Labour | Paul Stephen Caunce | 990 | 20.9 | −7.0 |
| Labour | Rob Dennis | 849 | 18.0 | −6.8 |
| Green | Harrison Balme | 780 | 16.5 | New |
| Liberal Democrats | Joshua Brignall-Morley | 351 | 7.4 | New |
| Turnout | | 4,729 | 34.27 | +1.27 |
| Conservative hold | | Swing | | |
| Conservative hold | | Swing | | |
| Conservative hold | | Swing | | |

=== Hatfield ===
Hatfield (3 seats)
| Party | Candidate | Votes | % | ±% |
|---|---|---|---|---|
| Labour | Linda Mary Curran* | 1,197 | 36.0 | −1.7 |
| Labour | Duncan Charles John Anderson* | 1,100 | 33.1 | −1.6 |
| Labour | Glynis Smith | 1,091 | 32.8 | +0.9 |
| Conservative | Emma Adams | 1,064 | 32.0 | +6.5 |
| Independent | Mick Glynn | 826 | 24.9 | −5.7 |
| Independent | Jessie Jamieson Credland | 825 | 24.8 | −0.3 |
| Conservative | Olivia Essem | 777 | 23.4 | New |
| Independent | Mark Steven Broadhurst | 685 | 20.6 | New |
| Conservative | Neil Saran Srivastava | 641 | 19.3 | New |
| Green | Rob Nicholas | 216 | 6.5 | New |
| Turnout | | 3,322 | 28.87 | − 1.03 |
| Labour hold | | Swing | | |
| Labour hold | | Swing | | |
| Labour hold | | Swing | | |

=== Hexthorpe & Balby North ===
Hexthorpe & Balby North (2 seats)
| Party | Candidate | Votes | % | ±% |
|---|---|---|---|---|
| Labour | Glyn Allen Jones* | 951 | 53.6 | −5.9 |
| Labour | Sophie Liu | 535 | 30.1 | −15.4 |
| Conservative | Liz Jones | 503 | 28.3 | +5.7 |
| Independent | Chris Nowak | 332 | 18.7 | New |
| Green | Angela Curtis | 277 | 15.6 | New |
| Independent | Tina Reid | 126 | 7.1 | New |
| Turnout | | 1,775 | 22.05 | −2.85 |
| Labour hold | | Swing | | |
| Labour hold | | Swing | | |

=== Mexborough ===
Mexborough (3 seats)
| Party | Candidate | Votes | % | ±% |
|---|---|---|---|---|
| Mexborough First | Sean Michael Gibbons* | 1,673 | 60.2 | −9.7 |
| Mexborough First | Bev Chapman* | 1,639 | 59.0 | −5.7 |
| Mexborough First | Andy Pickering* | 1,611 | 57.9 | −14.1 |
| Labour | Malcolm Gamble | 797 | 28.7 | +6.3 |
| Labour | Tony Rawlings | 426 | 15.3 | −5.9 |
| Labour | Mick Muddiman | 418 | 15.0 | +2.7 |
| Conservative | Rory Francis Wood Forester | 197 | 7.1 | +2.0 |
| Conservative | Teresa Mary Robson Glynn | 191 | 6.9 | New |
| Conservative | Colin Matthew Pinder | 188 | 6.8 | New |
| Green | Ann Jackson Gilbert | 110 | 4.0 | New |
| Turnout | | 2,780 | 23.89 | −3.71 |
| Mexborough First hold | | Swing | | |
| Mexborough First hold | | Swing | | |
| Mexborough First hold | | Swing | | |

=== Norton & Askern ===
Norton & Askern (3 seats)
| Party | Candidate | Votes | % | ±% |
|---|---|---|---|---|
| Labour | Austen William White* | 1,502 | 41.5 | −3.3 |
| Labour | Iris Beech* | 1,467 | 40.6 | −6.0 |
| Conservative | Thomas Michael Noon | 1,459 | 40.3 | +9.6 |
| Labour | Harry James Fisher | 915 | 25.3 | −16.2 |
| Conservative | Sean Poulter | 896 | 24.8 | New |
| Conservative | John Whiteside | 847 | 23.4 | New |
| Independent | Frank Jackson | 658 | 18.2 | −3.3 |
| Green | Alison Mary Briggs | 603 | 16.7 | New |
| No Description | Simon Epton | 495 | 13.7 | New |
| Turnout | | 3,616 | 31.30 | −0.50 |
| Labour hold | | Swing | | |
| Labour hold | | Swing | | |
| Conservative gain from Labour | | Swing | | |

=== Roman Ridge ===
Roman Ridge (2 seats)
| Party | Candidate | Votes | % | ±% |
|---|---|---|---|---|
| Labour | Leanne Hempshall | 1,055 | 42.4 | −11.5 |
| Labour | Julie Grace | 899 | 36.1 | −11.1 |
| Conservative | David Edward Clayton | 647 | 26.0 | −5.9 |
| Green | Tony Nicholson | 506 | 20.3 | +5.1 |
| Green | Kate Needham | 489 | 19.6 | +4.6 |
| Conservative | Danielle Jo Smith | 378 | 15.2 | New |
| Reform | Howard Bruce Rimmer | 207 | 8.3 | New |
| Turnout | | 2,490 | 29.17 | −1.03 |
| Labour hold | | Swing | | |
| Labour hold | | Swing | | |

=== Rossington & Bawtry ===
Rossington & Bawtry (3 seats)
| Party | Candidate | Votes | % | ±% |
|---|---|---|---|---|
| Labour | Rachael Blake* | 1,999 | 50.8 | +2.1 |
| Labour | Bob Anderson | 1,794 | 45.6 | +5.6 |
| Labour | Barry Johnson | 1,414 | 35.9 | −0.6 |
| Independent | John Nolan Cooke* | 1,147 | 29.1 | −14.8 |
| Conservative | Julie Anne Kong | 878 | 22.3 | −5.5 |
| Conservative | Mike Angus | 877 | 22.3 | New |
| Independent | Clive Graham Stone | 573 | 14.6 | −10.4 |
| Conservative | Patrick Musami | 564 | 14.3 | New |
| Green | Han Haydn | 335 | 8.5 | New |
| Turnout | | 3,935 | 28.95 | +0.35 |
| Labour hold | | Swing | | |
| Labour hold | | Swing | | |
| Labour hold | | Swing | | |

=== Sprotbrough ===
Sprotbrough (2 seats)
| Party | Candidate | Votes | % | ±% |
|---|---|---|---|---|
| Conservative | Cynthia Anne Ransome* | 1,521 | 46.8 | −6.9 |
| Conservative | Glenn Karl Bluff | 1,124 | 34.6 | −8.8 |
| Labour | David Holland | 1,008 | 31.0 | −5.0 |
| Green | Jonathan Blundell Wood* | 710 | 21.8 | New |
| Labour | Philip Allan Doherty | 651 | 20.0 | −4.3 |
| Green | Fiona Dorothy Patricia Cahill | 552 | 17.0 | +0.9 |
| SDP | Laura Jane McHardy | 100 | 3.1 | New |
| Turnout | | 3,252 | 36.75 | +1.05 |
| Conservative hold | | Swing | | |
| Conservative hold | | Swing | | |

=== Stainforth & Barnby Dun ===
Stainforth & Barnby Dun (2 seats)
| Party | Candidate | Votes | % | ±% |
|---|---|---|---|---|
| Labour | Sue Farmer | 678 | 32.3 | −18.1 |
| Conservative | Gary Stapleton | 663 | 31.5 | −4.1 |
| Conservative | Steven James Ratcliffe | 619 | 29.4 | New |
| Labour | Lee Michael Pitcher | 486 | 23.1 | −13.4 |
| No Description | Ken Keegan* | 374 | 17.8 | −32.6 |
| Independent | Anne Lesley Sylvester | 272 | 12.9 | New |
| Yorkshire | Rosemarie Squires | 208 | 9.9 | New |
| Yorkshire | George Derx* | 202 | 9.6 | −26.9 |
| Green | Richard Needham | 157 | 7.5 | New |
| No Description | Neil James Wood | 47 | 2.2 | New |
| Turnout | | 2,102 | 28.71 | +0.91 |
| Labour hold | | Swing | | |
| Conservative hold | | Swing | | |

=== Thorne & Moorends ===
Thorne & Moorends (3 seats)
| Party | Candidate | Votes | % | ±% |
|---|---|---|---|---|
| Labour | Susan Jane Durant* | 1,649 | 49.7 | −3.2 |
| Labour | Mark Stuart Houlbrook* | 1,534 | 46.2 | −3.3 |
| Labour | Joe Blackham* | 1,238 | 37.3 | −9.8 |
| Conservative | Paul David Tonge | 970 | 29.2 | +16.9 |
| No Description | Martin Williams | 918 | 27.7 | −2.4 |
| Conservative | James Norman Aitken | 674 | 20.3 | New |
| Conservative | Tracey Wheeler | 611 | 19.6 | New |
| Green | Gwyn Ap Harri | 537 | 16.2 | New |
| Turnout | | 3,318 | 24.89 | −4.91 |
| Labour hold | | Swing | | |
| Labour hold | | Swing | | |
| Labour hold | | Swing | | |

=== Tickhill & Wadworth ===
Tickhill & Wadworth (2 seats)
| Party | Candidate | Votes | % | ±% |
|---|---|---|---|---|
| Conservative | Nigel Cannings* | 2,032 | 64.9 | +20.3 |
| Conservative | Martin Damian Greenhalgh* | 1,332 | 42.5 | +11.0 |
| Labour | Phyllis Cowden | 740 | 23.6 | −0.3 |
| Labour | Louis Joseph Jackson | 633 | 20.2 | −1.0 |
| Liberal Democrats | Ian Michael Smith | 277 | 8.8 | −2.8 |
| Green | Helen Hopkins | 253 | 8.1 | New |
| Green | Kay Goddard | 226 | 7.2 | −3.0 |
| Turnout | | 3,131 | 35.60 | N/C |
| Conservative gain from Independent | | Swing | | |
| Conservative hold | | Swing | | |

=== Town ===
Town (3 seats)
| Party | Candidate | Votes | % | ±% |
|---|---|---|---|---|
| Labour | Gemma Louise Cobby | 1,768 | 50.2 | +0.4 |
| Labour | Dave Shaw* | 1,430 | 40.6 | −3.3 |
| Labour | Jake David Kearsley | 1,340 | 38.1 | −7.5 |
| Conservative | Molly Whiteside | 793 | 22.5 | −4.9 |
| Conservative | Dene Anthony Flannigan | 783 | 22.2 | New |
| Conservative | Reuben Glynn | 726 | 20.6 | New |
| Green | Julie Buckley | 725 | 20.6 | +3.2 |
| Yorkshire | Chris Whitwood | 521 | 14.8 | −27.9 |
| Liberal Democrats | Jonathan Paul Snelling | 276 | 7.8 | New |
| Turnout | | 3,520 | 25.86 | −3.84 |
| Labour hold | | Swing | | |
| Labour hold | | Swing | | |
| Labour hold | | Swing | | |

=== Wheatley Hills & Intake ===
Wheatley Hills & Intake (3 seats)
| Party | Candidate | Votes | % | ±% |
|---|---|---|---|---|
| Labour | Daniel Steven Barwell | 1,457 | 43.8 | −10.8 |
| Labour | Jane Kidd* | 1,445 | 43.5 | −7.3 |
| Labour | Emma Michelle Muddiman-Rawlins | 1,287 | 38.7 | −5.3 |
| Conservative | Roy John Penketh | 932 | 28.0 | +2.5 |
| Conservative | Mark Parkinson | 727 | 21.9 | −4.5 |
| Conservative | Nic Davison | 660 | 19.8 | New |
| Yorkshire | Andy Budden | 653 | 19.6 | −1.3 |
| Green | Julie Margaret Blount | 377 | 11.3 | New |
| Green | Jennifer Joanne Rozenfelds | 305 | 9.2 | New |
| Liberal Democrats | Dean Peter Southall | 232 | 7.0 | New |
| Turnout | | 3,325 | 25.96 | −1.24 |
| Labour hold | | Swing | | |
| Labour hold | | Swing | | |
| Labour hold | | Swing | | |

== Changes 2021–2025 ==
- Mexborough First councillor Bev Chapman (Mexborough) left the party in November 2023 after a falling out with deputy leader Sean Gibbons, initially sitting as an independent, before joining the Labour Party in December 2023.

=== By-elections ===
==== Wheatley Hills & Intake ====
A by-election was held in Wheatley Hills & Intake after Labour councillor Daniel Barwell resigned. Before his resignation, Barwell had been arrested for an alleged offence relating to the distribution of a controlled drug, on a warrant issued at the request of United States authorities, and suspended by Labour.

Wheatley Hills & Intake: 31 March 2022
| Party | Candidate | Votes | % | ±% |
|---|---|---|---|---|
| Labour | Yetunde Elebuibon | 827 | 46.0 | +2.2 |
| Conservative | Angus Michael Lindsay | 419 | 23.3 | −4.7 |
| Yorkshire | Andy Budden | 356 | 19.8 | +0.2 |
| Green | Jennifer Joanne Rozenfelds | 135 | 7.5 | −3.8 |
| Liberal Democrats | Dean Peter Southall | 60 | 3.3 | −3.7 |
| Turnout | | 1,800 | 13.92 | {{{change}}} |
| Labour hold | | Swing | | |

==== Rossington & Bawtry ====
A by-election was held in Rossington & Bawtry after Labour councillor Barry Johnson resigned.

Rossington & Bawtry: 16 November 2023
| Party | Candidate | Votes | % | ±% |
|---|---|---|---|---|
| Labour | Ken Guest | 1,467 | 56.7 | +5.9 |
| Conservative | Carol Greenhalgh | 492 | 19.0 | −3.3 |
| Independent | John Nolan Cooke | 461 | 17.8 | −11.3 |
| Reform | Surjit Singh Duhre | 168 | 6.5 | New |
| Turnout | | 2,599 | 19.29 | {{{change}}} |
| Labour hold | | Swing | | |

==== Town ====
A by-election was held in Town ward after Labour councillor Jake Kearsley resigned in May 2024 for personal reasons. It was held on the same day as the 2024 United Kingdom general election, which produced an unusually high turnout for a single-ward by-election.

Town: 4 July 2024
| Party | Candidate | Votes | % | ±% |
|---|---|---|---|---|
| Labour | Rob Dennis | 2,770 | 49.8 | +10.0 |
| Reform | Surjit Singh Duhre | 892 | 16.0 | New |
| Green | Julie Buckley | 805 | 14.5 | −4.6 |
| Conservative | Dene Flannigan | 723 | 13.0 | −7.2 |
| Independent | Nikki McDonald | 373 | 6.7 | N/A |
| Majority | | 1878 | 33.5 | N/A |
| Turnout | | 5,607 | 39.38 | +13.5 |
| Registered electors | | 14,239 | | |
| Rejected ballots | | 44 | 0.8 | |
| Labour hold | | Swing | | |
