= 2008 Doncaster Metropolitan Borough Council election =

2008 English local government election

Map of the 2008 Doncaster Metropolitan Borough Council election

The 2008 Doncaster Metropolitan Borough Council election took place on 1 May 2008 to elect a third of the members of Doncaster Metropolitan Borough Council, the council of the City of Doncaster in South Yorkshire, England. This was on the same day as the other 2008 United Kingdom local elections. The previous council election took place in 2007 and the following election was held in 2010.

In the election, the council stayed under no overall control. On 12 May 2008, Mayor of Doncaster Martin Winter registered a new party with two other councillors. Winter was later expelled from the Labour Party. In July 2008, he lost in a vote of no confidence.

== Results ==
Party	Previous	Seats +/-	2008
Labour	29	▼2	27
Liberal Democrats	12	Steady	12
Conservative	8	▲1	9
Other	14	▲1	15
