= Community Group =

Community Group was a British political party in Doncaster, South Yorkshire, founded in 2001. The Community Group had four councillors serving on Doncaster Metropolitan Borough council in 2009. The party deregistered in 2018.

The party was founded in the wake of a political scandal dubbed "Donnygate" that saw 21 Doncaster councillors convicted of expenses fraud in 1997. The party had 6 borough councillors in Doncaster in 2001. Party leader Martin Williams contested Doncaster North at the 2005 general election against Ed Miliband, receiving 2,365 votes (7.5%, in fourth place). Jessie Credland stood for election as Mayor of Doncaster for the party in 2005, coming fourth with 10,263 votes (9.4%). Garth Oxby defected to become an independent in May 2005 following a deal made with the Labour group for Community Group councillors to be given positions chairing council committees, a deal repeated the following year. Richard Walker and Jessie Credland also later left to sit as independent members. The party lost John Cooke's seat to Labour in 2007. In 2007, the party also had 10 town councillors.

Former Doncaster English Democrats Mayor Peter Davies was associated with the group. The Community Group's own candidate, Stuart Exelby, formerly a Labour councillor and deputy mayor from 2008–9, received 2152 votes. Martin Williams said of his election, "I am happy about this," but in February 2010 said that "I think the mayoral system is in tatters... It has been tried and failed."

== See also ==
- Doncaster local elections
