= City of Doncaster Council =

Local authority in South Yorkshire, England

- Council logo

Type
- Type: Metropolitan borough

History
- Founded: 1 April 1974

Leadership
- Civic Mayor: Jackie Dudley, Reform UK since 22 May 2026
- Elected Mayor: Ros Jones, Labour since 6 May 2013
- Chief Executive: Damian Allen since 2020

Structure
- Seats: Elected mayor plus 55 councillors
- Graph of the party split among 56 seats.
- Political groups: Administration (13) Labour (12+1) Other parties (43) Reform (33) Conservative (6) Independent (4)
- Joint committees: South Yorkshire Mayoral Combined Authority

Elections
- Voting system: Plurality-at-large
- Last election: 1 May 2025
- Next election: 3 May 2029

Meeting place
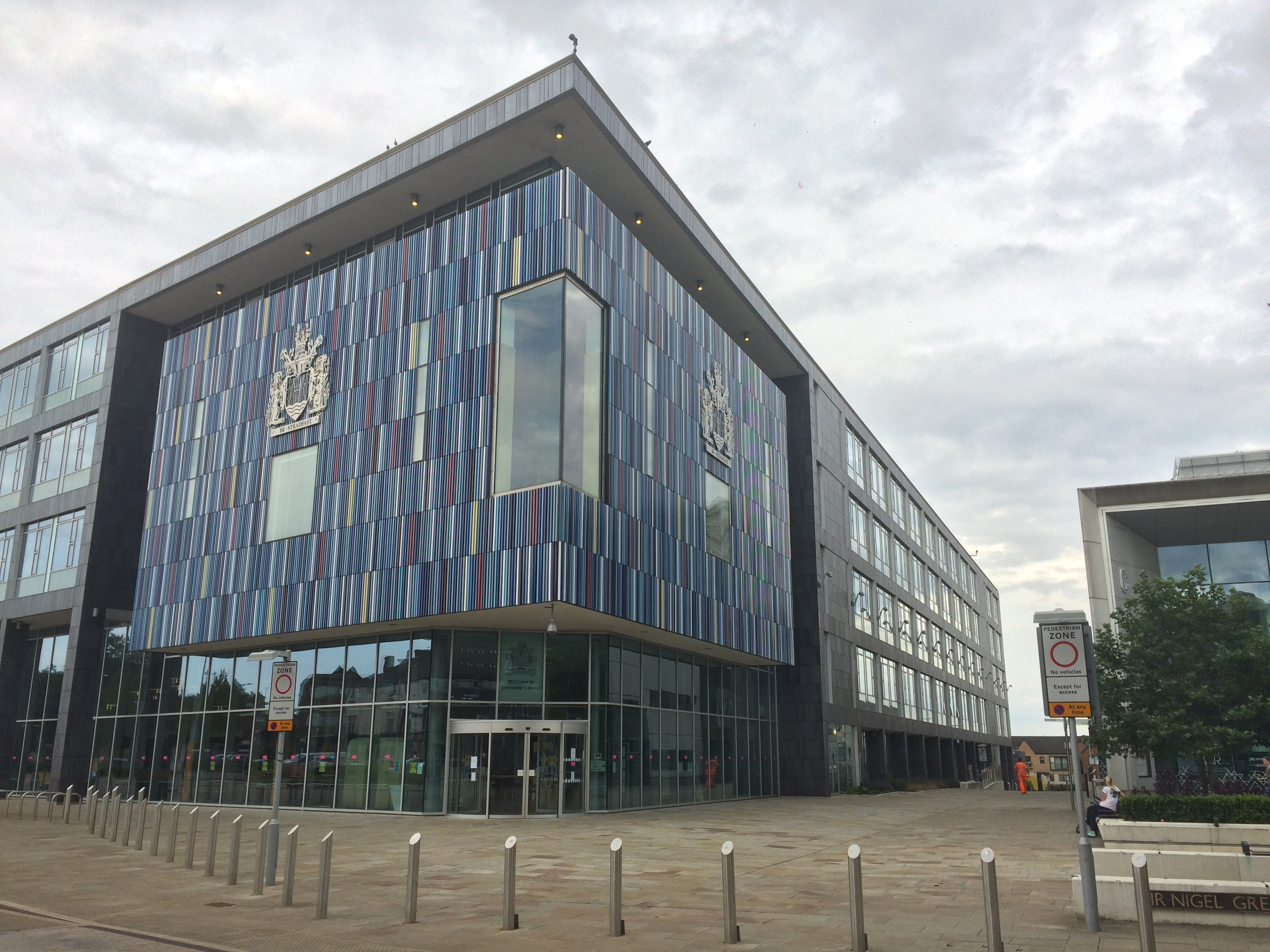
- Civic Office, Waterdale, Doncaster, DN1 3BU

Website
- www.doncaster.gov.uk

City of Doncaster Council is the local authority of the City of Doncaster, a metropolitan borough with city status in South Yorkshire, England. Prior to being awarded city status in 2022 the council was called Doncaster Metropolitan Borough Council. The council is based at the Civic Office in Waterdale, central Doncaster. It is one of four local authorities in South Yorkshire and provides the majority of local government services in Doncaster. The council is a member of the South Yorkshire Mayoral Combined Authority.

The council is led by a directly elected mayor. Since 2013 the post has been held by Ros Jones of the Labour Party. Since the 2025 election, Reform UK has held a majority of the seats on the council.

== History ==
The town of Doncaster was an ancient borough, with its first known charter dating from 1194. The borough was reformed to become a municipal borough in 1836 under the Municipal Corporations Act 1835, which standardised how most boroughs operated across the country. By 1927 the borough was considered large enough to run its own county-level services, and so it was made a county borough, independent from West Riding County Council.

The county borough was abolished in 1974 and replaced by the larger Metropolitan Borough of Doncaster, which also took in the abolished urban districts of Adwick le Street, Bentley with Arksey, Conisbrough, Mexborough, and Tickhill, the rural districts of Doncaster and Thorne, and (from Nottinghamshire) the parish of Finningley and part of the parish of Harworth (the latter being added to the parish of Bawtry). From 1974 until 1986 the council provided district-level services, with county-level services provided by South Yorkshire County Council. Following the abolition of the county council in 1986, Doncaster also took on county-level services, with some functions provided in joint arrangements with the other South Yorkshire boroughs.

Since 2014 the council has been a constituent member of the South Yorkshire Mayoral Combined Authority (called the Sheffield City Region until 2021), which has been led by the directly elected Mayor of South Yorkshire since 2018.

The borough was awarded city status in 2022, after which the council changed its named to City of Doncaster Council.

== Governance ==
The council provides both district-level and county-level services. Some functions are provided through joint committees with the other South Yorkshire authorities. Much of the borough is covered by civil parishes, which form an additional tier of local government for their areas.

=== Political control ===
At the 2025 elections, Reform UK won a majority of the seats on the council, while Labour's Ros Jones retained the position of elected mayor. Positions on the council's ruling cabinet are chosen by the mayor, and all cabinet positions were given to Labour councillors. Jones was also reported to be putting arrangements in place for certain Reform UK and Conservative councillors to be able to discuss policy in private before decisions are formally made by the cabinet.

Political control of the council since the 1974 reforms has been as follows:

Party in control	Years
Labour	1974–2004
No overall control	2004–2010
Labour	2010–2025
Reform	2025–present

=== Leadership ===
Prior to 2002, political leadership was provided by the leader of the council. Since 2002, political leadership has been provided instead by a directly elected Mayor of Doncaster. The council separately appoints a civic mayor each year, who is largely ceremonial.

The leaders from 1974 to 2002 were:

Councillor	Party	From	To
Les Adams	Labour	1974	1980
George Brumwell	Labour	1980	May 1982
Martin Redmond	Labour	May 1982	1983
Jim MacFarlane	Labour	1983	6 Nov 1985
Gordon Gallimore	Labour	1985	1994
Peter Welsh	Labour	1994	1997
Malcolm Glover	Labour	1997	1998
Colin Wedd	Labour	1998	2001
Martin Winter	Labour	2001	5 May 2002

The directly elected mayors since 2002 have been: (Note: Mayoral terms of office run from the fourth day after polling day.)

Mayor	Party	From	To
Martin Winter	Labour	6 May 2002	28 May 2008
Martin Winter	Independent	28 May 2008	7 Jun 2009
Peter Davies	English Democrat	8 Jun 2009	5 Feb 2013
Peter Davies	Independent	5 Feb 2013	5 May 2013
Ros Jones	Labour	6 May 2013	

=== Composition ===
Following the 2025 election, and subsequent changes until June 2026 composition of the council (excluding the elected mayor's seat) was:

Party	Councillors
Reform	34
Labour	12
Conservative	6
Independent	3
Total	55

Two of the independent councillors sit together as the "Independent Voices for Doncaster" group. The next election is due in 2029.

== Premises ==
The council is based at the Civic Office on Waterdale in Doncaster. It was purpose-built for the council and opened in January 2013.

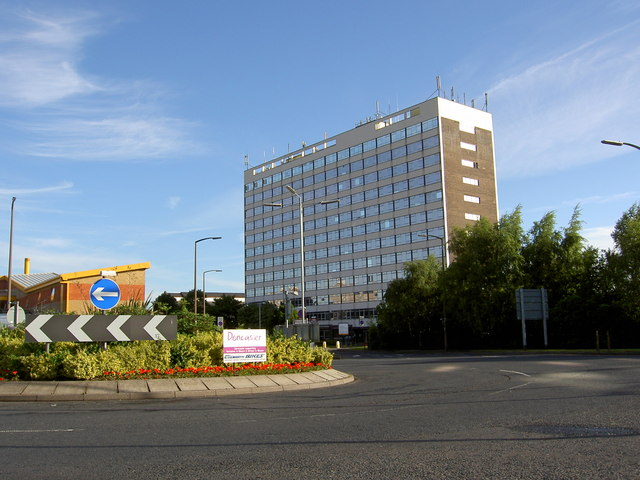
Council House, College Road: Council's headquarters 1992–2013

From 1992 until 2013 the council was based at the Council House on College Road, formerly called Coal House, which had been built in 1966 as the headquarters of the National Coal Board. The Council House was subsequently demolished.

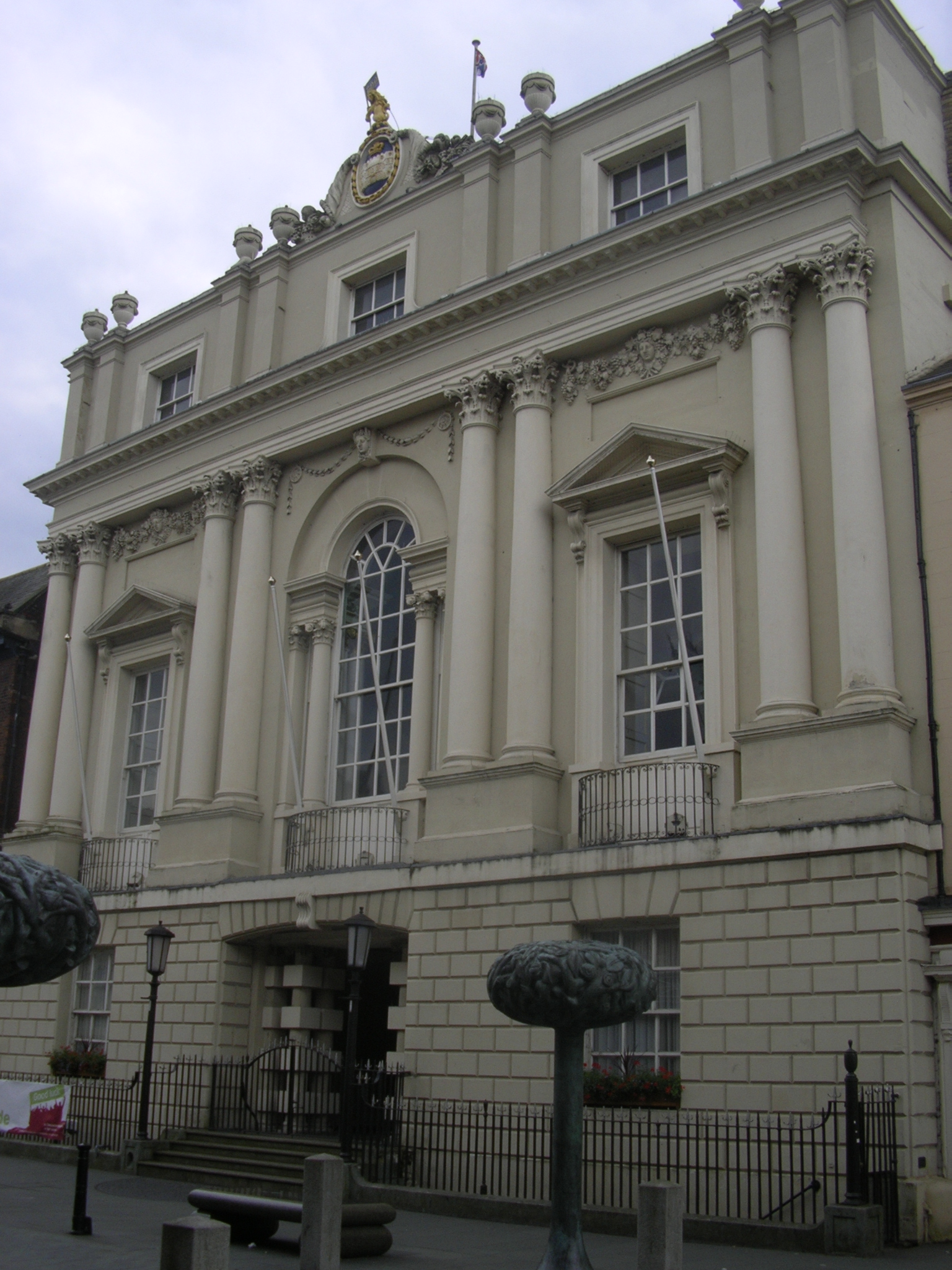
Mansion House

The council's annual meeting where new civic mayors are appointed is held at the city's Mansion House.

== Elections ==
Since the last boundary changes in 2015 the council has comprised 55 councillors representing 21 wards, with each ward electing two or three councillors. Elections are held every four years.

From 1973 to 2014, the council was elected by thirds every year except the year in which county council elections took place in other parts of England. In 2015, the whole council was elected due to boundary changes to the wards and it was decided that the whole council would be elected every four years from 2017, so that the council elections would coincide with the election of the Mayor of Doncaster.

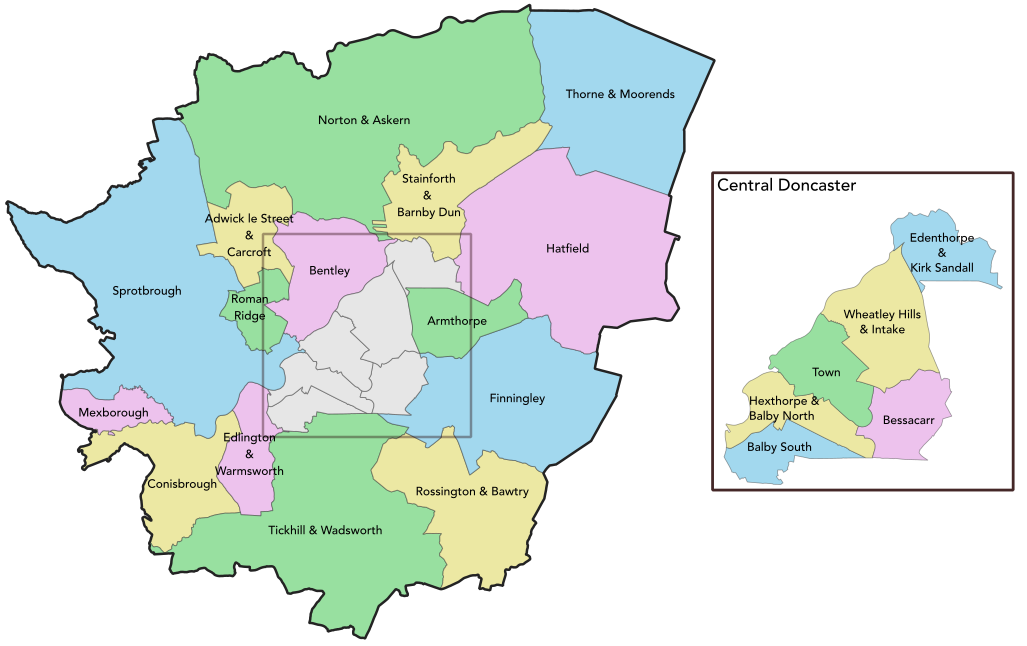
