= 2012 United Kingdom local elections =

Elections that were held across England, Scotland and Wales

- 3 May 2012

All 36 metropolitan boroughs, 18 out of 55 unitary authorities, 74 out of 201 district councils, all 32 Scottish council areas, 21 out of 22 Welsh principal councils, and 3 directly elected mayors
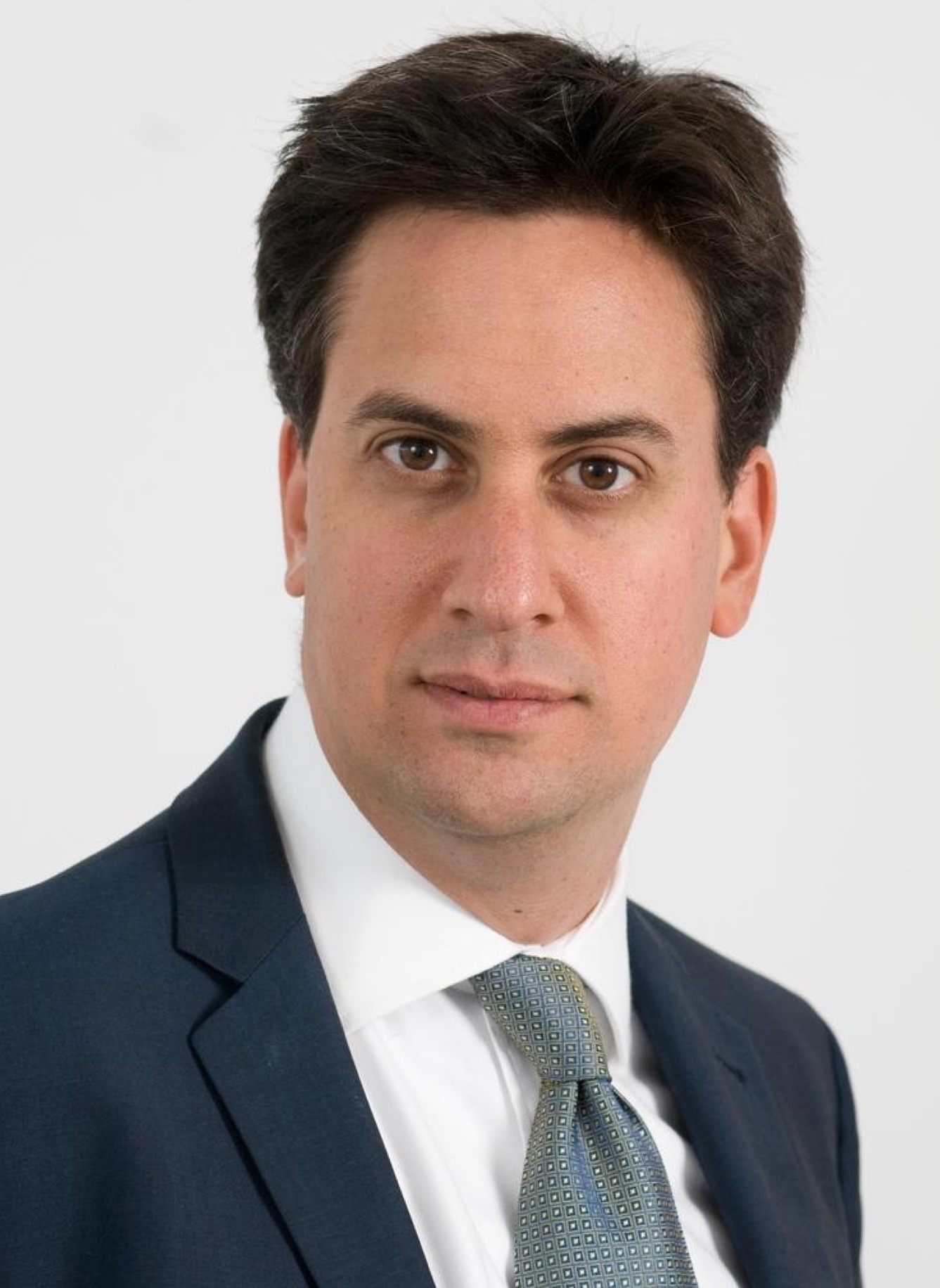

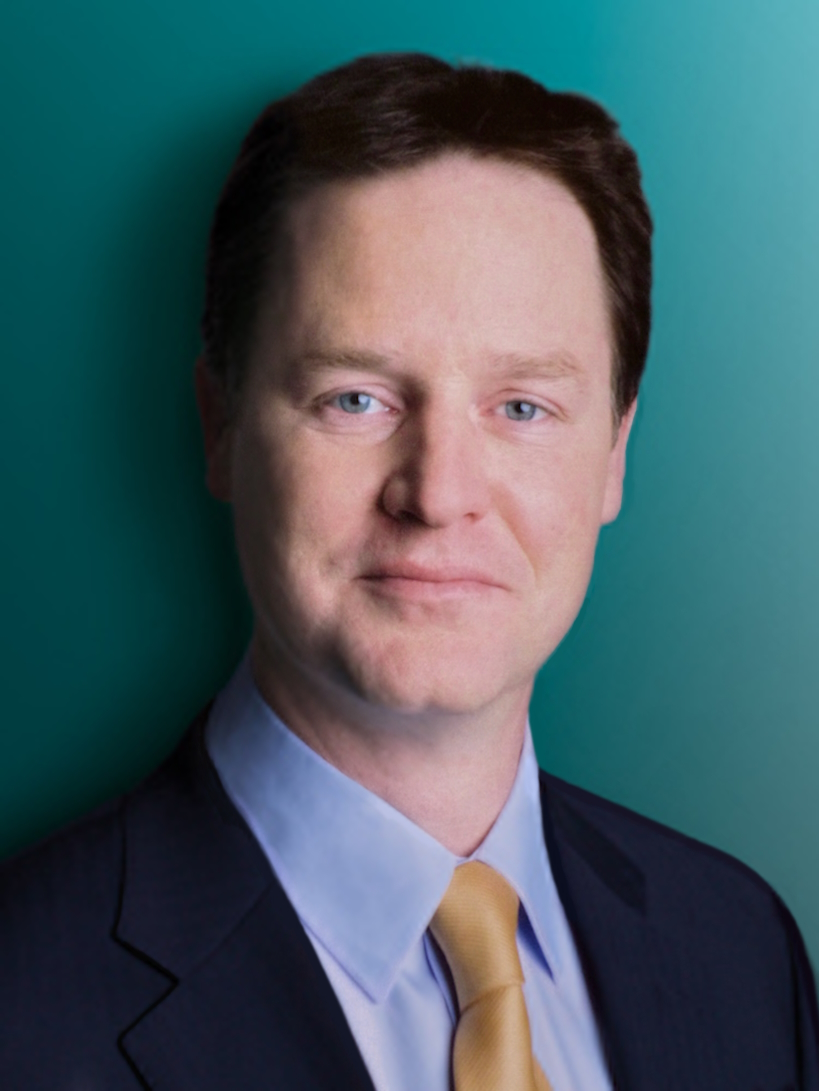

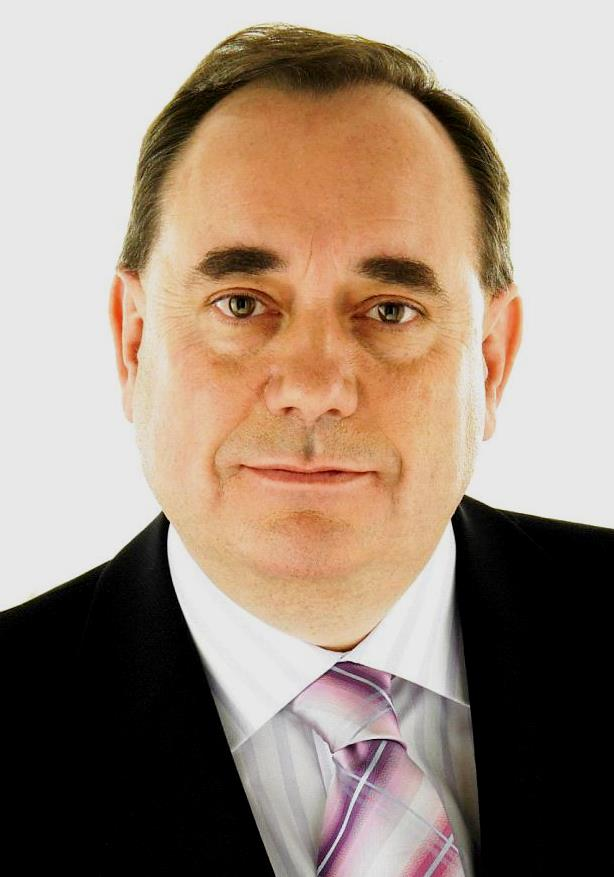

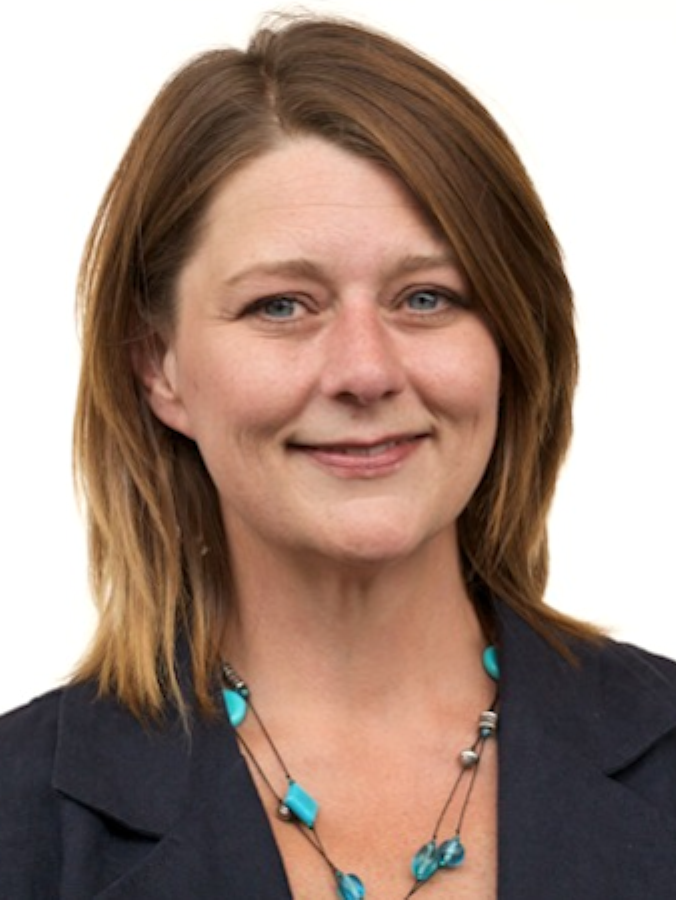
	First party	Second party	Third party
Leader	Ed Miliband	David Cameron	Nick Clegg
Party	Labour	Conservative	Liberal Democrats
Leader since	25 September 2010	6 December 2005	18 December 2007
Swing	▲1%	▼4%	▲1%
Projected vote-share	38%	31%	16%
Councils	75	42	6
Councils +/–	▲32	▼12	▼1
Councillors	2,158	1,005	431
Councillors +/–	▲823	▼405	▼336
	Fourth party	Fifth party
Leader	Alex Salmond	Leanne Wood
Party	SNP	Plaid Cymru
Leader since	3 September 2004	16 March 2012
Projected vote-share	2	0
Councils	▲2	▼1
Councils +/–	424	158
Councillors	▲57	▼41
- Colours denote the winning party, as shown in the main table of results.

The 2012 United Kingdom local elections were held across England, Scotland and Wales on 3 May 2012. Elections were held in 128 English local authorities, all 32 Scottish local authorities and 21 of the 22 Welsh unitary authorities, alongside three mayoral elections including the London mayoralty and the London Assembly. Referendums were also held in 11 English cities to determine whether or not to introduce directly elected mayors.

The BBC's projected national vote share put Labour on 38%, the Conservatives on 31%, the Liberal Democrats on 16% and others on 15%. Rallings and Thrasher of Plymouth University estimated 39% for Labour, 33% for the Conservatives, 15% for the Liberal Democrats, and 13% for others.

The inaugural election of police and crime commissioners for 41 of the 43 territorial police forces in England and Wales took place separately, in November 2012.

== Electoral process ==
All registered electors (British, Irish, Commonwealth and European Union citizens) who were aged 18 or over on Thursday 3 May 2012 were entitled to vote in the local elections. Those who were temporarily away from their ordinary address (for example, away working, on holiday, in student accommodation or in hospital) were also entitled to vote in the local elections, although those who had moved abroad and registered as overseas electors could not vote in the local elections. It was possible to register to vote at more than one address (such as a university student who had a term-time address and lives at home during holidays) at the discretion of the local Electoral Register Office, but it remained an offence to vote more than once in the same local government election.

The deadline to register to vote in the election was midnight on Wednesday 18 April 2012, though anyone who qualified as an anonymous elector had until midnight on Thursday 26 April 2012 to register.

== Results ==
=== Overall results - Great Britain ===
Party	Councils		Councillors	
Party	Number	Change	Number	Change
Labour	75	▲32	2,158	▲823
Conservative	32	▼12	1,005	▼405
Liberal Democrats	6	▼1	431	▼336
SNP	2	▲2	424	▲57
Plaid Cymru	0	▼1	158	▼41
Green	0	Steady	26	▲5
Residents	0	Steady	21	▲5
Green	0	Steady	14	▲6
UKIP	0	Steady	9	Steady
Health Concern	0	Steady	5	▲3
Respect	0	Steady	5	▲5
Liberal	0	Steady	4	▼6
Others	5	▼2	596	▼151
No overall control	51	▼18	n/a	n/a

== England ==
Map of the results following the elections in England. Black indicates a council in no overall control, whilst white indicates area where no elections took place.

The local authorities having elections in 2012 (excluding mayoral elections) covered about 40% of the total English electorate, with 15.9 million electors entitled to vote. Turnout overall was 31.0%.

In summary, the accumulated local authority vote and seats won by political party was:

English National vote and seat share
Party	Vote	Seats
Labour	43.1%	49.4%
Conservative	27.5%	32.5%
Liberal Democrats	14.0%	11.9%
Green	4.2%	1.1%
Independent	3.2%	2.8%
Other	8.0%	2.3%

Note the equivalent of these figures may not be commonly available for other election years. They represent the actual numbers of votes cast and should not be falsely compared to the more commonly available figures based on the projections for the whole of Great Britain.

=== Metropolitan boroughs ===
All 36 Metropolitan boroughs had one third of their seats up for election.

Council	Previous control	Result	Details
Barnsley	Labour	Labour hold	Details
Birmingham	No overall control	Labour gain	Details
Bolton	Labour	Labour hold	Details
Bradford	No overall control	No overall control hold (Labour Minority with Green support)	Details
Bury	Labour	Labour hold	Details
Calderdale	No overall control	No overall control hold	Details
Coventry	Labour	Labour hold	Details
Doncaster	Labour	Labour hold	Details
Dudley	Conservative	Labour gain	Details
Gateshead	Labour	Labour hold	Details
Kirklees	No overall control	No overall control hold	Details
Knowsley	Labour	Labour hold	Details
Leeds	Labour	Labour hold	Details
Liverpool	Labour	Labour hold	Details
Manchester	Labour	Labour hold	Details
Newcastle upon Tyne	Labour	Labour hold	Details
North Tyneside	Labour	Labour hold	Details
Oldham	Labour	Labour hold	Details
Rochdale	Labour	Labour hold	Details
Rotherham	Labour	Labour hold	Details
St Helens	Labour	Labour hold	Details
Salford	Labour	Labour hold	Details
Sandwell	Labour	Labour hold	Details
Sefton	No overall control	Labour gain	Details
Sheffield	Labour	Labour hold	Details
Solihull	Conservative	Conservative hold	Details
South Tyneside	Labour	Labour hold	Details
Stockport	No overall control	No overall control hold (Lib Dem Minority)	Details
Sunderland	Labour	Labour hold	Details
Tameside	Labour	Labour hold	Details
Trafford	Conservative	Conservative hold	Details
Wakefield	Labour	Labour hold	Details
Walsall	No overall control	No overall control hold (Conservative Minority with Lib Dem Support)	Details
Wigan	Labour	Labour hold	Details
Wirral	No overall control	Labour gain	Details
Wolverhampton	Labour	Labour hold	Details

=== Unitary authorities ===
==== Whole council up for election ====
Two unitary authorities that would usually have had a third of their seats up for election, actually had elections for all their seats because of the implementation of boundary changes.

Council	Previous control	Result	Details
Hartlepool	Labour	Labour hold	Details
Swindon	Conservative	Conservative hold	Details

==== One third of council up for election ====
In 16 English unitary authorities, one third of the council was up for election.

Council	Previous control	Result	Details
Blackburn with Darwen	Labour	Labour hold	Details
Derby	No overall control	Labour gain	Details
Halton	Labour	Labour hold	Details
Kingston upon Hull	Labour	Labour hold	Details
Milton Keynes	No overall control	No overall control hold	Details
North East Lincolnshire	No overall control	Labour gain	Details
Peterborough	Conservative	Conservative hold	Details
Plymouth	Conservative	Labour gain	Details
Portsmouth	Liberal Democrats	Liberal Democrats hold	Details
Reading	No overall control	Labour gain	Details
Slough	Labour	Labour hold	Details
Southampton	Conservative	Labour gain	Details
Southend-on-Sea	Conservative	No overall control gain	Details
Thurrock	No overall control	Labour gain	Details
Warrington	Labour	Labour hold	Details
Wokingham	Conservative	Conservative hold	Details

=== District councils ===
==== Whole council up for election ====
Four district councils that would usually have had one-third of their seats due for election, actually had full council elections as a result of the implementation of new ward boundaries.

Council	Previous control	Result	Details
Broxbourne	Conservative	Conservative hold	Details
Daventry	Conservative	Conservative hold	Details
Rugby	Conservative	Conservative hold	Details
Rushmoor	Conservative	Conservative hold	Details

==== Half of council up for election ====
7 district councils had half of their seats up for election.

Council	Previous control	Result	Details
Adur	Conservative	Conservative hold	Details
Cheltenham	Liberal Democrats	Liberal Democrats hold	Details
Fareham	Conservative	Conservative hold	Details
Gosport	Conservative	Conservative hold	Details
Hastings	Labour	Labour hold	Details
Nuneaton and Bedworth	No overall control	Labour gain	Details
Oxford	Labour	Labour hold	Details

==== One third of council up for election ====
In 63 district authorities, one third of the seats were up for election.

Council	Previous control	Result	Details
Amber Valley	Conservative	Conservative hold	Details
Basildon	Conservative	Conservative hold	Details
Basingstoke and Deane	Conservative	Conservative hold	Details
Bassetlaw	Labour	Labour hold	Details
Brentwood	Conservative	Conservative hold	Details
Burnley	No overall control	Labour gain	Details
Cambridge	Liberal Democrats	Liberal Democrats hold (casting vote of the Mayor)	Details
Cannock Chase	No overall control	Labour gain	Details
Carlisle	No overall control	Labour gain	Details
Castle Point	Conservative	Conservative hold	Details
Cherwell	Conservative	Conservative hold	Details
Chorley	No overall control	Labour gain	Details
Colchester	No overall control	No overall control hold	Details
Craven	Conservative	Conservative hold	Details
Crawley	Conservative	Conservative hold	Details
Eastleigh	Liberal Democrats	Liberal Democrats hold	Details
Elmbridge	Conservative	Conservative hold	Details
Epping Forest	Conservative	Conservative hold	Details
Exeter	No overall control	Labour gain	Details
Gloucester	Conservative	No overall control gain	Details
Great Yarmouth	Conservative	Labour gain	Details
Harlow	Conservative	Labour gain	Details
Harrogate	Conservative	Conservative hold	Details
Hart	Conservative	No overall control gain	Details
Havant	Conservative	Conservative hold	Details
Hertsmere	Conservative	Conservative hold	Details
Huntingdonshire	Conservative	Conservative hold	Details
Hyndburn	Labour	Labour hold	Details
Ipswich	Labour	Labour hold	Details
Lincoln	Labour	Labour hold	Details
Maidstone	Conservative	Conservative hold	Details
Mole Valley	No overall control	No overall control hold	Details
Newcastle-under-Lyme	No overall control	Labour gain	Details
North Hertfordshire	Conservative	Conservative hold	Details
Norwich	No overall control	Labour gain	Details
Pendle	No overall control	No overall control hold	Details
Preston	Labour	Labour hold	Details
Purbeck	No overall control	No overall control hold	Details
Redditch	Conservative	Labour gain	Details
Reigate and Banstead	Conservative	Conservative hold	Details
Rochford	Conservative	Conservative hold	Details
Rossendale	No overall control	Labour gain	Details
Runnymede	Conservative	Conservative hold	Details
St Albans	No overall control	No overall control hold	Details
South Cambridgeshire	Conservative	Conservative hold	Details
South Lakeland	Liberal Democrats	Liberal Democrats hold	Details
Stevenage	Labour	Labour hold	Details
Stratford-on-Avon	Conservative	Conservative hold	Details
Stroud	No overall control	No overall control hold	Details
Tamworth	Conservative	Conservative hold	Details
Tandridge	Conservative	Conservative hold	Details
Three Rivers	Liberal Democrats	Liberal Democrats hold	Details
Tunbridge Wells	Conservative	Conservative hold	Details
Watford	Liberal Democrats	Liberal Democrats hold	Details
Welwyn Hatfield	Conservative	Conservative hold	Details
West Lancashire	Conservative	Conservative hold	Details
West Oxfordshire	Conservative	Conservative hold	Details
Weymouth and Portland	No overall control	No overall control hold	Details
Winchester	No overall control	Conservative gain	Details
Woking	Conservative	Conservative hold	Details
Worcester	Conservative	No overall control gain	Details
Worthing	Conservative	Conservative hold	Details
Wyre Forest	Conservative	No overall control gain	Details

=== Mayoral elections ===
Three direct mayoral elections were held.

Local Authority	Previous Mayor	Mayor-elect	Details
London	Boris Johnson (Conservative)	Boris Johnson (Conservative)	Details
Salford	none	Ian Stewart (Labour)	Details
Liverpool	none	Joe Anderson (Labour)	Details

=== Mayoral referendums ===
Referendums were also held in 11 English cities to determine whether or not to introduce the position of a directly elected mayor. These polls took place in Birmingham, Bradford, Bristol, Coventry, Leeds, Manchester, Newcastle upon Tyne, Nottingham, Sheffield and Wakefield. Of these 11 cities, only Bristol chose direct election (rather than council appointment) of a mayor. In addition, the citizens of Doncaster voted on the same day to continue electing their mayors directly.

== Scotland ==
Map of the control of Scottish councils following the 2012 council elections. Black indicates no overall control, red indicates majority Scottish Labour control, and yellow indicates majority Scottish National Party control.

Map of the largest party on each Scottish council following the 2012 council elections. Red indicates Scottish Labour, yellow Scottish National Party, white Independents and blue Scottish Conservatives. Patterned areas indicate a council where two parties have the same number of seats.

All council seats were up for election in the 32 Scottish authorities.

Council	Previous control	Result	Details
Aberdeen City	No overall control	No overall control hold	Details
Aberdeenshire	No overall control	No overall control hold	Details
Angus	No overall control	SNP gain	Details
Argyll and Bute	No overall control	No overall control hold	Details
Clackmannanshire	No overall control	No overall control hold	Details
Dumfries and Galloway	No overall control	No overall control hold	Details
Dundee City	No overall control	SNP gain	Details
East Ayrshire	No overall control	No overall control hold	Details
East Dunbartonshire	No overall control	No overall control hold	Details
East Lothian	No overall control	No overall control hold	Details
East Renfrewshire	No overall control	No overall control	Details
City of Edinburgh	No overall control	No overall control hold	Details
Falkirk	No overall control	No overall control hold	Details
Fife	No overall control	No overall control hold	Details
Glasgow City	Labour	Labour hold	Details
Highland	No overall control	No overall control hold	Details
Inverclyde	No overall control	No overall control hold	Details
Midlothian	Labour	No overall control gain	Details
Moray	No overall control	No overall control	Details
Na h-Eileanan Siar	Independent	Independent hold	Details
North Ayrshire	No overall control	No overall control hold	Details
North Lanarkshire	Labour	Labour hold	Details
Orkney	Independent	Independent hold	Details
Perth and Kinross	No overall control	No overall control hold	Details
Renfrewshire	No overall control	Labour gain	Details
Scottish Borders	No overall control	No overall control hold	Details
Shetland	Independent	Independent hold	Details
South Ayrshire	No overall control	No overall control hold	Details
South Lanarkshire	No overall control	No overall control hold	Details
Stirling	No overall control	No overall control hold	Details
West Dunbartonshire	No overall control	Labour gain	Details
West Lothian	No overall control	No overall control hold	Details

== Wales ==
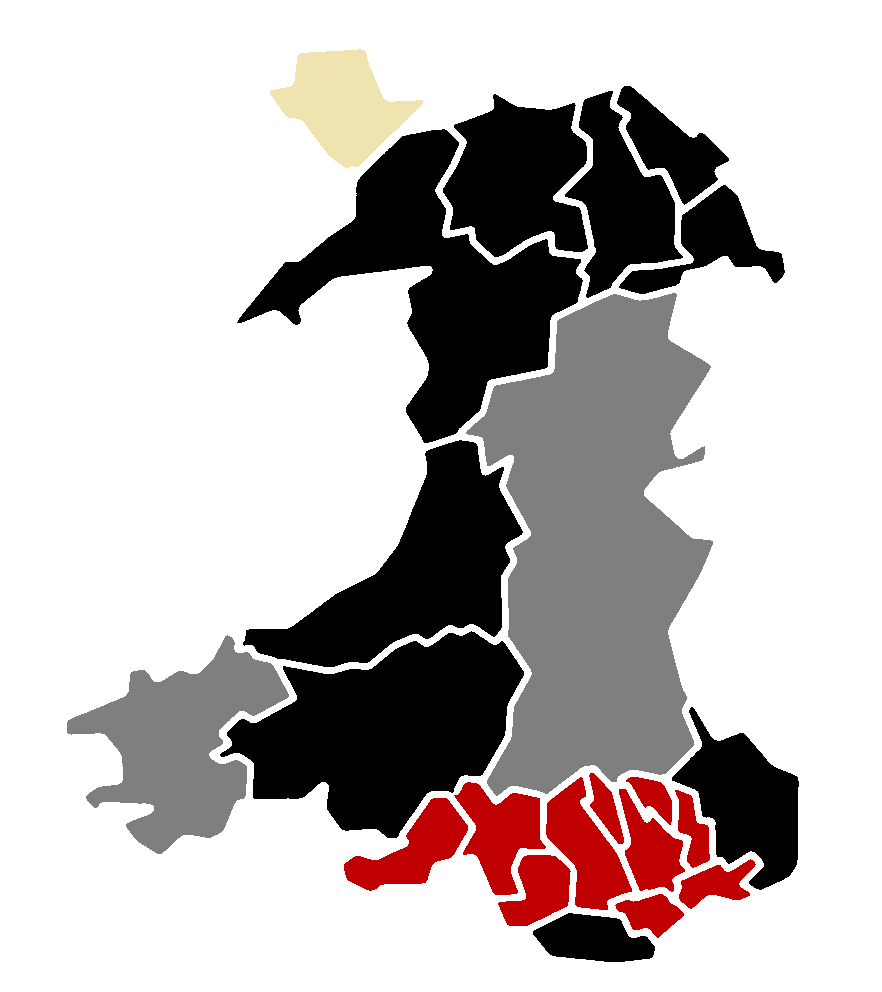
Map showing the results of the elections in Wales Key: Labour control Independent control No Overall Control No election held

Party	Votes	%	+/-	Councils	+/-	Seats	+/-
Labour	304,296	36.0%	▲9.4%	10	▲8	577	▲237
Plaid Cymru	133,961	15.8%	▼1.1%	0	Steady	158	▼39
Conservative	108,365	12.8%	▼2.8%	0	▼2	105	▼67
Liberal Democrats	68,619	8.1%	▼4.8%	0	Steady	72	▼92
Independent/Others	231,026	27.3%	▼0.7%	2	▼1	329	▼40
No overall control	n/a	n/a	n/a	9	▼5	n/a	n/a

In 21 out of 22 Welsh authorities, the whole council was up for election. On 17 January 2012, the Welsh Government announced that elections for Anglesey council have been postponed to May 2013.

Council	2008 Result	2012 Result	Details
Blaenau Gwent	No overall control	Labour gain	Details
Bridgend	No overall control	Labour gain	Details
Caerphilly	No overall control	Labour gain	Details
Cardiff	No overall control	Labour gain	Details
Carmarthenshire	No overall control	No overall control hold	Details
Ceredigion	No overall control	No overall control hold	Details
Conwy	No overall control	No overall control hold	Details
Denbighshire	No overall control	No overall control hold	Details
Flintshire	No overall control	No overall control hold	Details
Gwynedd	No overall control	No overall control hold	Details
Merthyr Tydfil	Independent	Labour gain	Details
Monmouthshire	Conservative	No overall control gain	Details
Neath Port Talbot	Labour	Labour hold	Details
Newport	No overall control	Labour gain	Details
Pembrokeshire	Independent	Independent hold	Details
Powys	Independent	Independent hold	Details
Rhondda Cynon Taff	Labour	Labour hold	Details
Swansea	No overall control	Labour gain	Details
Torfaen	No overall control	Labour gain	Details
Vale of Glamorgan	Conservative	No overall control gain	Details
Wrexham	No overall control	No overall control hold	Details

== See also ==
- Political make-up of local councils in the United Kingdom
