= 2012 Great Yarmouth Borough Council election =

2012 UK local government election

Results of the 2012 Great Yarmouth Borough Council election

The 2012 Great Yarmouth Council election was held on 3 May 2012 to elect members of Great Yarmouth Council, alongside nationwide local elections.
