= 2012 Slough Borough Council election =

2012 UK local government election

Results of the 2012 Slough Borough Council election

The 2012 Slough Council election took place on 3 May 2012 to elect members of Slough Borough Council in England. This was on the same day as other 2012 United Kingdom local elections.

14 wards (one third of the council) were up for election.

After the election, the composition of the council was:

- Labour 35
- Conservative 5
- Liberal Democrats 1
