= 2012 South Tyneside Metropolitan Borough Council election =

2012 UK local government election

Map of the results of the 2012 South Tyneside council election. Labour in red and Conservative in blue.

The 2012 South Tyneside Metropolitan Borough Council election took place on 3 May 2012 to elect members of South Tyneside Metropolitan Borough Council in England. This was on the same day as other 2012 United Kingdom local elections. One third (18) of the seats were being contested, of which Labour won 17, and the Conservatives one.

== New make-up of the council ==
Party political make-up of South Tyneside Council
| Party | Seats | | | Council composition (4 May 2012) |
| Party | 2010 | 2011 | 2012 | Council composition (4 May 2012) |
|---|---|---|---|---|
| Labour | 36 | 39 | 48 | |
| Independent | 10 | 11 | 4 | |
| Conservative | 3 | 1 | 1 | |
| UKIP | 0 | 0 | 1 | |
| Progressives | 3 | 2 | 0 | |
| Liberal Democrats | 2 | 1 | 0 | |

== Ward results ==
An asterisk denotes an incumbent.

=== Beacon & Bents ward ===
Beacon & Bents
| Party | Candidate | Votes | % | ±% |
|---|---|---|---|---|
| Labour | John Anglin | 1,120 | 43.48 | +11.03 |
| Independent | Ahmed Khan* | 917 | 35.60 | −11.56 |
| Conservative | Ali Hayder | 173 | 6.72 | +1.42 |
| Independent | Phil Brown | 147 | 5.71 | N/A |
| BNP | James Hills | 123 | 4.77 | −4.30 |
| Liberal | Ashleigh Brewer | 50 | 1.94 | N/A |
| Independent | Siamak Kaikavoosi | 46 | 1.79 | N/A |
| Majority | | 203 | 7.88 | |
| Turnout | | 2,576 | 36.97 | −6.41 |
| Labour gain from Independent | | Swing | | |

=== Bede ward ===
Bede
| Party | Candidate | Votes | % | ±% |
|---|---|---|---|---|
| Labour | Margaret Peacock | 922 | 47.53 | +2.84 |
| Independent | Lee Hughes | 842 | 43.40 | N/A |
| Green | Tony Gair | 95 | 4.90 | N/A |
| Conservative | Oliver Wallhead | 81 | 4.18 | −3.98 |
| Majority | | 80 | 4.12 | |
| Turnout | | 1,945 | 32.55 | −5.85 |
| Labour hold | | Swing | | |

=== Biddick & All Saints ward ===
Biddick & All Saints
| Party | Candidate | Votes | % | ±% |
|---|---|---|---|---|
| Labour | Anne Walsh* | 1,193 | 67.40 | +31.60 |
| Independent | Kraig White | 316 | 17.85 | N/A |
| BNP | Donna Watson | 107 | 6.01 | −2.65 |
| Conservative | Brian Gilchrist | 78 | 4.41 | −2.11 |
| Liberal | David Selby | 76 | 4.29 | N/A |
| Majority | | 877 | 49.55 | |
| Turnout | | 1,778 | 28.01 | −5.18 |
| Labour hold | | Swing | | |

=== Boldon Colliery ward ===
Boldon Colliery
| Party | Candidate | Votes | % | ±% |
|---|---|---|---|---|
| Labour | Joanne Bell* | 1,534 | 61.38 | +15.04 |
| Independent | Ian Diamond | 647 | 25.89 | N/A |
| Conservative | Stewart Hay | 203 | 8.12 | −8.03 |
| BNP | Ileene Gilchrist | 115 | 4.60 | −4.73 |
| Majority | | 887 | 35.49 | |
| Turnout | | 2,507 | 34.15 | −3.44 |
| Labour hold | | Swing | | |

=== Cleadon & East Boldon ward ===
Cleadon & East Boldon
| Party | Candidate | Votes | % | ±% |
|---|---|---|---|---|
| Conservative | Jeff Milburn* | 1,692 | 53.97 | −13.87 |
| Labour | Margaret Meling | 1,443 | 46.03 | +13.87 |
| Majority | | 249 | 7.94 | |
| Turnout | | 3,145 | 45.45 | −2.50 |
| Conservative hold | | Swing | | |

=== Cleadon Park ward ===
Cleadon Park
| Party | Candidate | Votes | % | ±% |
|---|---|---|---|---|
| Labour | Alexander Donaldson* | 820 | 45.89 | +7.59 |
| Independent | June Elsom | 799 | 44.71 | N/A |
| Conservative | Quintin Smith | 168 | 9.40 | −6.39 |
| Majority | | 21 | 1.18 | |
| Turnout | | 1,793 | 33.60 | −5.09 |
| Labour hold | | Swing | | |

=== Fellgate & Hedworth ward ===
Fellgate & Hedworth
| Party | Candidate | Votes | % | ±% |
|---|---|---|---|---|
| Labour | Alan Smith | 1,226 | 55.50 | +7.23 |
| Independent | Geraldine White | 786 | 35.58 | N/A |
| BNP | Maureen Scott | 83 | 3.76 | N/A |
| Conservative | Ian Armstrong | 81 | 3.67 | −4.66 |
| Liberal | Andrew Cotton | 33 | 1.49 | N/A |
| Majority | | 440 | 19.89 | |
| Turnout | | 2,212 | 37.49 | −4.00 |
| Labour hold | | Swing | | |

=== Harton ward ===
Harton
| Party | Candidate | Votes | % | ±% |
|---|---|---|---|---|
| Labour | Pat Hay | 1,356 | 59.53 | +25.93 |
| Progressives | Marjorie Robinson | 602 | 26.43 | −7.28 |
| Conservative | Marilyn Huartt | 227 | 9.96 | −2.34 |
| Liberal | David Wood | 93 | 4.08 | N/A |
| Majority | | 754 | 33.10 | |
| Turnout | | 2,290 | 34.16 | −7.45 |
| Labour gain from Progressives | | Swing | | |

=== Hebburn North ward ===
In 2008, Joe Abbott stood, and won, in this ward as a Liberal Democrat candidate.

Hebburn North
| Party | Candidate | Votes | % | ±% |
|---|---|---|---|---|
| Labour | Mary Butler | 972 | 48.92 | +24.06 |
| Independent | Joe Abbott* | 771 | 38.80 | −7.22 |
| BNP | Martin Vaughan | 184 | 9.26 | −7.73 |
| Conservative | David Fettis | 60 | 3.02 | −1.37 |
| Majority | | 201 | 10.12 | |
| Turnout | | 1,988 | 30.24 | −7.18 |
| Labour gain from Liberal Democrats | | Swing | | |

=== Hebburn South ward ===
Hebburn South
| Party | Candidate | Votes | % | ±% |
|---|---|---|---|---|
| Labour | John McCabe* | 1,877 | 86.58 | +42.14 |
| Conservative | John Coe | 291 | 13.42 | +6.50 |
| Majority | | 1,586 | 73.15 | |
| Turnout | | 2,193 | 36.00 | −8.51 |
| Labour hold | | Swing | | |

=== Horsley Hill ward ===
Horsley Hill
| Party | Candidate | Votes | % | ±% |
|---|---|---|---|---|
| Labour | Mark Walsh | 1,407 | 53.28 | +19.23 |
| Independent | Gordon Finch | 959 | 36.31 | −2.53 |
| Conservative | Ross Huartt | 204 | 7.72 | −6.60 |
| Liberal | Joseph Stephenson | 71 | 2.69 | N/A |
| Majority | | 448 | 19.96 | |
| Turnout | | 2,650 | 37.84 | −6.73 |
| Labour gain from Independent | | Swing | | |

=== Monkton ward ===
Monkton
| Party | Candidate | Votes | % | ±% |
|---|---|---|---|---|
| Labour | Melanie Cartwright | 1,154 | 56.35 | +23.59 |
| Independent | John Hodgson | 763 | 37.26 | +0.33 |
| Conservative | James Milburn | 131 | 6.40 | −0.97 |
| Majority | | 391 | 19.09 | |
| Turnout | | 2,060 | 32.10 | −8.58 |
| Labour gain from Independent | | Swing | | |

=== Primrose ward ===
Primrose
| Party | Candidate | Votes | % | ±% |
|---|---|---|---|---|
| Labour | Jim Perry* | 1,284 | 75.26 | −26.67 |
| BNP | George Gilchrist | 227 | 13.31 | −19.62 |
| Conservative | David Ireland | 195 | 11.43 | −7.04 |
| Majority | | 1,057 | 61.96 | |
| Turnout | | 1,717 | 27.95 | −5.30 |
| Labour hold | | Swing | | |

=== Simonside & Rekendyke ward ===
Simonside & Rekendyke
| Party | Candidate | Votes | % | ±% |
|---|---|---|---|---|
| Labour | Edward Malcolm* | 1,348 | 80.62 | +32.15 |
| Labour | Lynne Proudlock | 1,262 | 75.48 | +27.01 |
| Liberal | Melanie Baker | 265 | 15.85 | N/A |
| BNP | Peter Foreman | 238 | 14.23 | +1.99 |
| Conservative | George Smith | 231 | 13.82 | +1.71 |
| Majority | | 997 | 59.63 | |
| Turnout | | 1,858 | 29.14 | −3.39 |
| Labour hold | | Swing | | |

=== West Park ward ===
West Park
| Party | Candidate | Votes | % | ±% |
|---|---|---|---|---|
| Labour | Gladys Hobson | 944 | 49.66 | +19.52 |
| Progressives | Enid Hetherington* | 653 | 34.35 | −11.20 |
| Conservative | Anthony Dailly | 191 | 10.05 | −4.73 |
| Green | Anna Heyman | 113 | 5.94 | −3.59 |
| Majority | | 291 | 15.31 | |
| Turnout | | 1,912 | 33.16 | −1.10 |
| Labour gain from Progressives | | Swing | | |

=== Westoe ward ===
Westoe
| Party | Candidate | Votes | % | ±% |
|---|---|---|---|---|
| Labour | Sheila Stephenson | 1,013 | 47.25 | +28.38 |
| Independent | Victor Thompson | 639 | 29.80 | N/A |
| Conservative | Edward Russell | 265 | 12.36 | +1.50 |
| Progressives | Paul Walker | 165 | 7.70 | N/A |
| Liberal | Stephen Flower | 62 | 2.89 | N/A |
| Majority | | 374 | 17.44 | |
| Turnout | | 2,149 | 32.82 | −8.79 |
| Labour gain from Independent | | Swing | | |

=== Whitburn & Marsden ward ===
Whitburn & Marsden
| Party | Candidate | Votes | % | ±% |
|---|---|---|---|---|
| Labour | Tracey Dixon* | 1,661 | 76.19 | +25.42 |
| Conservative | Elizabeth Turnbull | 519 | 23.81 | −10.03 |
| Majority | | 1,142 | 52.39 | |
| Turnout | | 2,208 | 37.81 | −4.07 |
| Labour hold | | Swing | | |

=== Whiteleas ward ===
Whiteleas
| Party | Candidate | Votes | % | ±% |
|---|---|---|---|---|
| Labour | Doreen Purvis | 1,098 | 56.26 | +13.05 |
| Independent | John Haram* | 632 | 30.08 | −12.06 |
| BNP | Christopher Thornton | 185 | 8.81 | −1.42 |
| Independent | Robin Coombes | 124 | 5.90 | N/A |
| Conservative | Christopher Taylor | 62 | 2.95 | −5.47 |
| Majority | | 466 | 22.18 | |
| Turnout | | 2,107 | 32.24 | −3.76 |
| Labour gain from Independent | | Swing | | |
