= 2012 Bury Metropolitan Borough Council election =

Local election in England

Results of the 2012 Bury Metropolitan Borough Council election

Elections to Bury Council took place on 3 May 2012. This was on the same day as other 2012 United Kingdom local elections. One third of the council was up for election and the Labour Party retained control of the council.

17 seats were contested. The Labour Party won 14 seats, and the Conservatives won 3 seats.

After the election, the total composition of the council was as follows:

- Labour 35
- Conservative 14
- Liberal Democrats 2

== Election result ==
Bury local election result 2012
| Party | Seats | Gains | Losses | Net gain/loss | Seats % | Votes % | Votes | +/− |
|---|---|---|---|---|---|---|---|---|
| Labour | 14 | 10 | 0 | +10 | | 51.0 | 24,589 | +2.3 |
| Conservative | 3 | 0 | 7 | -7 | | 28.6 | 13,822 | -5.6 |
| Liberal Democrats | 0 | 0 | 3 | -3 | | 9.3 | 4,482 | -1.8 |
| UKIP | 0 | 0 | 0 | | | 8.8 | 4,243 | +5.1 |
| Green | 0 | 0 | 0 | 0 | 0 | 1.1 | 551 | +0.5 |
| English Democrat | 0 | 0 | 0 | 0 | 0 | 1.1 | 553 | +0.5 |

== Ward results ==
Besses
| Party | Candidate | Votes | % | ±% |
|---|---|---|---|---|
| Labour | Elizabeth Fitzgerald | 1,484 | 61.81 | +6.9 |
| English Democrat | Stephen Morris | 367 | 15.29 | +8.6 |
| Conservative | Ian Silvester | 358 | 14.91 | −1.7 |
| Liberal Democrats | Julie Baum | 185 | 7.71 | −9.1 |
| Majority | | 1,117 | 46.52 | +8.5 |
| Turnout | | 2,401 | 28.6 | −5.2 |
| Labour hold | | Swing | | |

Church
| Party | Candidate | Votes | % | ±% |
|---|---|---|---|---|
| Conservative | Roy Walker | 1,704 | 50.99 | −0.9 |
| Labour | Andrew Jones | 1,132 | 33.87 | −7.0 |
| UKIP | Julie Reynolds | 370 | 11.07 | N/A |
| Liberal Democrats | Lynda Arthur | 124 | 3.71 | −3.6 |
| Majority | | 572 | 17.12 | +6.0 |
| Turnout | | 3,342 | 38.9 | −6.3 |
| Conservative hold | | Swing | | |

East
| Party | Candidate | Votes | % | ±% |
|---|---|---|---|---|
| Labour | Stella Smith | 1,430 | 57.06 | +6.5 |
| UKIP | Pete Entwhistle | 566 | 22.59 | +8.8 |
| Conservative | Azmat Husain | 501 | 19.99 | −11.3 |
| Majority | | 864 | 34.48 | +15.2 |
| Turnout | | 2,506 | 30.9 | −8.7 |
| Labour hold | | Swing | | |

Elton
| Party | Candidate | Votes | % | ±% |
|---|---|---|---|---|
| Labour | Susan Southworth | 1,323 | 45.23 | −0.4 |
| Conservative | Yvonne Creswell | 1,044 | 35.69 | −9.8 |
| UKIP | Nicola Wood | 444 | 15.18 | N/A |
| Liberal Democrats | Andrew Garner | 106 | 3.62 | −1.3 |
| Majority | | 279 | 9.54 | +5.4 |
| Turnout | | 2,925 | 33.4 | −7.9 |
| Labour gain from Conservative | | Swing | | |

Holyrood
| Party | Candidate | Votes | % | ±% |
|---|---|---|---|---|
| Labour | Paddy Heneghan | 1,510 | 45.4 | +3.3 |
| Liberal Democrats | Vic D'Albert | 1,359 | 40.9 | +4.2 |
| Conservative | Carl Curran | 260 | 7.8 | −8.5 |
| English Democrat | Valerie Morris | 186 | 5.6 | +0.8 |
| Majority | | 151 | 4.5 | −0.9 |
| Turnout | | 3,326 | 37.0 | −3.7 |
| Labour gain from Liberal Democrats | | Swing | | |

Moorside
| Party | Candidate | Votes | % | ±% |
|---|---|---|---|---|
| Labour | Dot Cassidy | 1,690 | 65.2 | +19.6 |
| Conservative | Peter Ashworth | 417 | 16.1 | −11.3 |
| UKIP | Victor Hagan | 379 | 14.6 | +14.6 |
| Liberal Democrats | Graeme Lambert | 97 | 3.7 | −7.2 |
| Majority | | 1,273 | 49.1 | +27.0 |
| Turnout | | 2,594 | 28.2 | −8.3 |
| Labour hold | | Swing | | |

North Manor
| Party | Candidate | Votes | % | ±% |
|---|---|---|---|---|
| Conservative | Dorothy Gunther | 1,873 | 56.6 | +10.4 |
| Labour | Steven Treadgold | 899 | 27.2 | −1.9 |
| Green | Glyn Heath | 355 | 10.7 | +2.2 |
| Liberal Democrats | Ewan Arthur | 174 | 5.3 | −6.6 |
| Majority | | 974 | 29.4 | +12.3 |
| Turnout | | 3,311 | 40.7 | −9.1 |
| Conservative hold | | Swing | | |

Pilkington Park
| Party | Candidate | Votes | % | ±% |
|---|---|---|---|---|
| Conservative | Michelle Wiseman | 1,312 | 48.0 | +4.4 |
| Labour | John Mallon | 1,266 | 46.4 | +5.3 |
| Liberal Democrats | Richard Baum | 132 | 4.8 | +0.5 |
| Majority | | 46 | 1.7 | −0.7 |
| Turnout | | 2,731 | 34.7 | −7.4 |
| Conservative hold | | Swing | | |

Radcliffe East
| Party | Candidate | Votes | % | ±% |
|---|---|---|---|---|
| Labour | Daisy Bailey | 1,442 | 59.1 | +5.8 |
| Conservative | Derek Brooks | 513 | 21.0 | −12.3 |
| UKIP | Nick McNeill | 389 | 16.0 | +6.9 |
| Liberal Democrats | Joanne O'Hanlon | 85 | 3.5 | −0.8 |
| Majority | | 929 | 38.1 | +18.1 |
| Turnout | | 2,438 | 27.8 | −7.3 |
| Labour gain from Conservative | | Swing | | |

Radcliffe North
| Party | Candidate | Votes | % | ±% |
|---|---|---|---|---|
| Labour | Sharon Briggs | 1,609 | 51.4 | +0.7 |
| Conservative | Jackie Harris | 1,067 | 34.1 | −10.3 |
| UKIP | Chris Frost | 358 | 11.4 | +11.4 |
| Liberal Democrats | Rod Rew | 87 | 2.8 | −2.1 |
| Majority | | 542 | 17.3 | +11.0 |
| Turnout | | 3,128 | 35.2 | −5.5 |
| Labour gain from Conservative | | Swing | | |

Radcliffe West
| Party | Candidate | Votes | % | ±% |
|---|---|---|---|---|
| Labour | Tony Isherwood | 1,523 | 69.3 | −0.7 |
| Conservative | Stuart Penketh | 331 | 15.1 | −11.0 |
| UKIP | Ian Hayes | 275 | 12.5 | +12.5 |
| Liberal Democrats | Kamran Islam | 62 | 2.8 | −0.7 |
| Majority | | 1,192 | 54.2 | +10.7 |
| Turnout | | 2,199 | 25.5 | −6.5 |
| Labour hold | | Swing | | |

Ramsbottom
| Party | Candidate | Votes | % | ±% |
|---|---|---|---|---|
| Labour | Luise Fitzwalter | 1,605 | 49.2 | +2.3 |
| Conservative | Barry Theckston | 1,241 | 38.1 | −8.8 |
| UKIP | Julian Corden | 300 | 9.2 | +9.2 |
| Liberal Democrats | Wilf Davison | 103 | 3.2 | −3.0 |
| Majority | | 364 | 11.2 | +11.0 |
| Turnout | | 3,260 | 36.7 | +6.3 |
| Labour gain from Conservative | | Swing | | |

Redvales
| Party | Candidate | Votes | % | ±% |
|---|---|---|---|---|
| Labour | Shaheena Haroon | 1,751 | 57.1 | +0.4 |
| Conservative | Beverly Sullivan | 625 | 20.4 | −5.4 |
| UKIP | Steve Evans | 501 | 16.3 | +4.9 |
| Liberal Democrats | Tim Boaden | 175 | 5.7 | +0.4 |
| Majority | | 1,126 | 36.7 | +5.8 |
| Turnout | | 3,066 | 33.1 | −6.2 |
| Labour gain from Conservative | | Swing | | |

Sedgley
| Party | Candidate | Votes | % | ±% |
|---|---|---|---|---|
| Labour | Andrea Simpson | 1,833 | 60.3 | +2.8 |
| Liberal Democrats | Steve Wright | 623 | 20.5 | −0.4 |
| Conservative | James Daly | 554 | 18.2 | +1.1 |
| Majority | | 1,210 | 39.8 | +3.2 |
| Turnout | | 3,038 | 33.6 | −11.5 |
| Labour gain from Liberal Democrats | | Swing | | |

St. Mary's
| Party | Candidate | Votes | % | ±% |
|---|---|---|---|---|
| Labour | Jane Black | 1,320 | 47.0 | −0.9 |
| Liberal Democrats | Mary D'Albert | 956 | 34.0 | +3.1 |
| Conservative | Yvonne Holland | 326 | 11.6 | −4.9 |
| Green | Andrew McKee | 196 | 7.0 | +7.0 |
| Majority | | 364 | 13.0 | −4.0 |
| Turnout | | 2,810 | 34.3 | −6.7 |
| Labour gain from Liberal Democrats | | Swing | | |

Tottington
| Party | Candidate | Votes | % | ±% |
|---|---|---|---|---|
| Labour | Simon Carter | 1,085 | 42.2 | +1.4 |
| Conservative | Roger Brown | 965 | 37.5 | −13.1 |
| UKIP | Andy Eccles | 379 | 11.7 | +11.7 |
| Liberal Democrats | David Foss | 135 | 5.2 | −3.5 |
| Majority | | 120 | 4.3 | |
| Turnout | | 2,573 | 31.8 | −8.9 |
| Labour gain from Conservative | | Swing | | |

Unsworth
| Party | Candidate | Votes | % | ±% |
|---|---|---|---|---|
| Labour | David Jones | 1,687 | 60.4 | +4.3 |
| Conservative | Sam Cohen | 731 | 26.2 | −8.2 |
| UKIP | Peter Redstone | 282 | 10.1 | +3.9 |
| Liberal Democrats | Zadok Day | 79 | 2.8 | −0.5 |
| Majority | | 956 | 34.2 | +12.5 |
| Turnout | | 2,793 | 37.3 | −7.7 |
| Labour gain from Conservative | | Swing | | |
