= 2012 Newcastle City Council election =

2012 UK local government election

Newcastle City Council Elections, 2012
- 3 May 2012
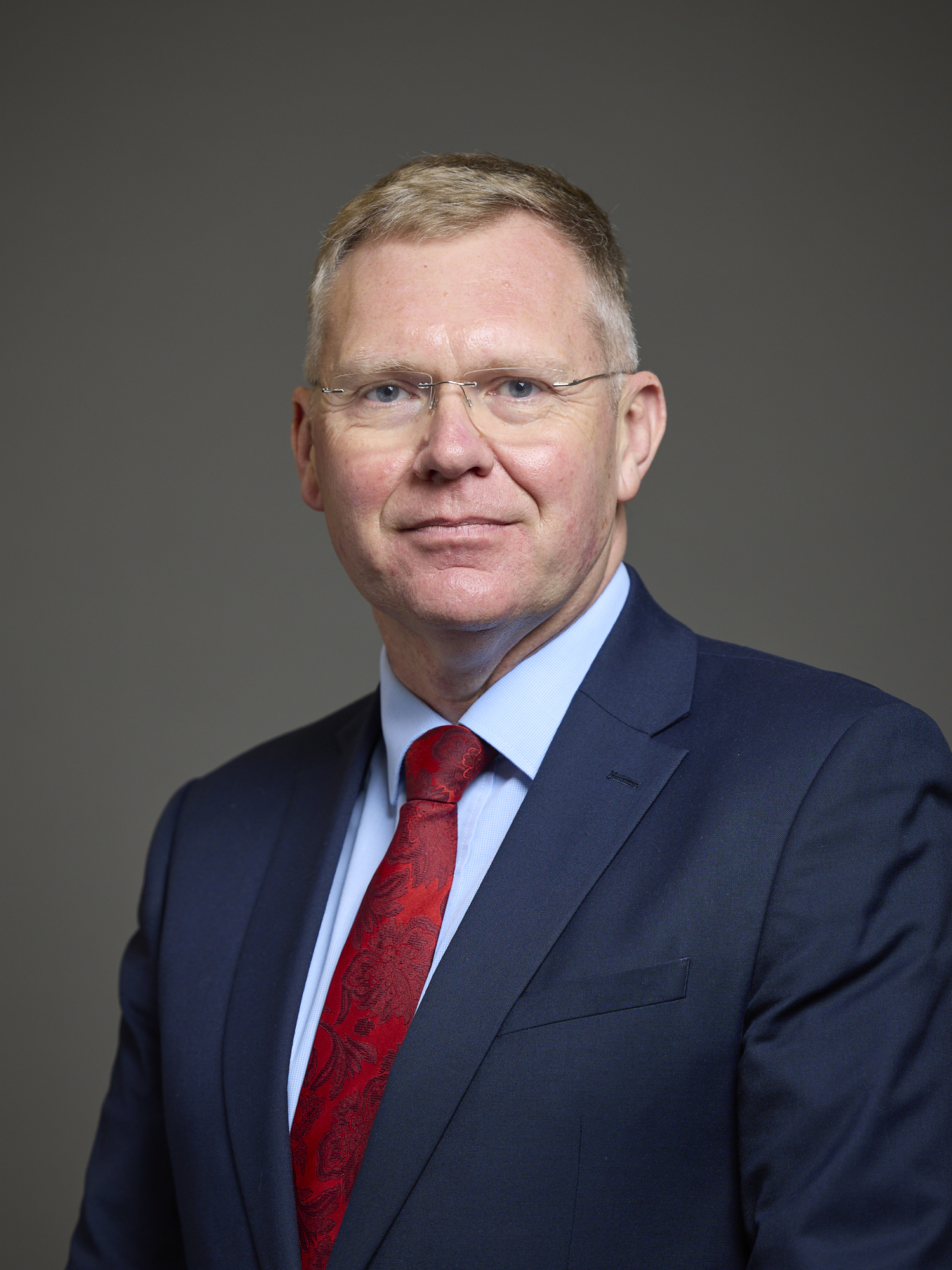
	First party	Second party	Third party
Leader	Nick Forbes	David Falkner
Party	Labour	Liberal Democrats	Independent
Leader's seat	Westgate	Fawdon
Last election	45	32	1
Swing		▼1%
Councillors	51	26	1
Councillors +/–	▲6	▼6	▲

The 2012 Newcastle City Council election took place on 3 May 2012 to elect members of Newcastle City Council in North East England. This was on the same day as other 2012 United Kingdom local elections.

== Ward by Ward Results ==
Spoilt votes not included below.

=== Benwell & Scotswood ward ===
Benwell & Scotswood
Party	Candidate	Votes	%	±%
Labour	Rob Higgins	1,959	71.1	+23.0
Newcastle First	Margaret McKenna	444	16.1	N/A
Conservative	Gregg Peers	201	7.3	−4.9
Liberal Democrats	Lutz Lemmer	151	5.5	−15.0
Majority		1,515	55.0	
Turnout		2,755		
Labour hold		Swing		

=== Blakelaw ward ===
Blakelaw
Party	Candidate	Votes	%	±%
Labour	David Stockdale	1,948	70.5	+40.2
Liberal Democrats	Colin Daglish	615	22.3	−27.3
Conservative	Oliver Kaer	199	7.2	−3.3
Majority		1,333	48.3	
Turnout		2,762		
Labour gain from Liberal Democrats		Swing		

=== Byker ward ===
Byker
Party	Candidate	Votes	%	±%
Labour	George Allison	1,594	77.9	+21.3
Newcastle First	Angela McKenna	225	11.0	N/A
Liberal Democrats	Peter Thompson	118	5.8	−11.2
Conservative	Donald Robinson	110	5.4	−4.0
Majority		1,369	66.9	
Turnout		2,047		
Labour hold		Swing		

=== Castle ward ===
Castle
Party	Candidate	Votes	%	±%
Liberal Democrats	Ian Graham	1,432	49.9	−10.0
Labour	Shane Smith	991	34.5	N/A
Newcastle First	Malcolm Smith	229	8.0	−7.4
Conservative	Katie Bennett	217	7.6	−17.1
Majority		441	15.4	
Turnout		2,869		
Liberal Democrats hold		Swing		

=== Dene ward ===
Dene
Party	Candidate	Votes	%	±%
Liberal Democrats	Wendy Taylor	1,744	62.8	+1.5
Liberal Democrats	Karen Robinson	1,521	54.8	−6.5
Labour	Ian Rossiter	865	31.2	+13.9
Labour	Yvonne Bell	820	29.5	+12.3
Conservative	Heather Chambers	354	12.8	−12.6
Conservative	Kenneth Wake	246	8.9	−16.4
Majority		879/656		
Turnout		2,775		
Liberal Democrats hold		Swing		

=== Denton ward ===
Denton
Party	Candidate	Votes	%	±%
Labour	Michael Burke	1,757	57.7	+32.0
Newcastle First	Alan McKenna	525	17.2	N/A
Liberal Democrats	Kevin Brown	475	15.6	−34.1
Conservative	Alan Birkmyre	188	6.2	−4.7
BNP	Bill Curry	99	3.3	−6.6
Majority		1,232	40.5	
Turnout		3,044		
Labour gain from Liberal Democrats		Swing		

=== East Gosforth ward ===
East Gosforth
Party	Candidate	Votes	%	±%
Liberal Democrats	Peter Leggott	1,308	43.0	−19.6
Labour	Ed Derrick	1,059	34.8	+18.2
Green	Frances Hinton	364	12.0	N/A
Conservative	Timothy Gilks	310	10.2	−10.6
Majority		249	8.2	
Turnout		3,041		
Liberal Democrats hold		Swing		

=== Elswick ward ===
Elswick
Party	Candidate	Votes	%	±%
Labour	Ann Schofield	1,666	79.0	+40.8
Newcastle First	Olga Shorton	203	9.6	N/A
Liberal Democrats	Matthew Folker	126	6.0	−6.7
Conservative	Ron Toward	115	5.5	−1.9
Majority		1,463	69.3	
Turnout		2,110		
Labour hold		Swing		

=== Fawdon ward ===
Fawdon
Party	Candidate	Votes	%	±%
Liberal Democrats	Brenda Hindmarsh	1,488	50.6	−9.4
Labour	Bill Dodds	1,144	38.9	+17.9
BNP	Anita Cooper	147	5.0	N/A
Conservative	Marie Brown	84	2.9	−3.7
Newcastle First	Maureen Smith	76	2.6	N/A
Majority		344	11.7	
Turnout		2,939		
Liberal Democrats hold		Swing		

=== Fenham ward ===
Fenham
Party	Candidate	Votes	%	±%
Labour	Marion Talbot	1,735	59.8	+23.4
Liberal Democrats	P.J. Morrissey	643	22.2	−23.5
Newcastle First	Ian Fraser	361	12.4	N/A
Conservative	Jacqueline McNally	163	5.6	−3.3
Majority		1,092	37.6	
Turnout		2,902		
Labour gain from Liberal Democrats		Swing		

=== Kenton ward ===
Kenton
Party	Candidate	Votes	%	±%
Labour	Jane Streather	1,723	72.0	+19.2
Liberal Democrats	Tracy Connell	364	15.2	−13.8
Conservative	Gerry Langley	305	12.8	−5.4
Majority		1,359	56.8	
Turnout		2,392		
Labour hold		Swing		

=== Lemington ward ===
Leamington
Party	Candidate	Votes	%	±%
Labour	Louise Sutcliffe	1,227	45.6	+7.7
Liberal Democrats	Lawrence Hunter	694	25.8	−17.1
Newcastle First	Jason Smith	684	25.4	N/A
Conservative	Matthew Windle	85	3.2	−5.2
Majority		533	19.8	
Turnout		2,690		
Labour gain from Liberal Democrats		Swing		

=== Newburn ward ===
Newburn
Party	Candidate	Votes	%	±%
Labour	Steve Fairlee	1,481	54.8	+15.9
Liberal Democrats	Mike Curthoys	426	15.8	−27.3
Newcastle First	John Gordon	407	15.1	N/A
Independent	Idwal John	246	9.1	N/A
Conservative	Mary Toward	144	5.3	+0.7
Majority		1,055	39.0	
Turnout		2,704		
Labour gain from Liberal Democrats		Swing		

=== North Heaton ward ===
North Heaton
Party	Candidate	Votes	%	±%
Liberal Democrats	Doreen Huddart	1,582	48.9	−6.4
Labour	Denise Jones	1,262	39.0	+16.5
Green	Mike Rabley	226	7.0	−2.2
Conservative	Laura Dobie	166	5.1	−7.9
Majority		320	9.9	
Turnout		3,236		
Liberal Democrats hold		Swing		

=== North Jesmond ward ===
North Jesmond
Party	Candidate	Votes	%	±%
Liberal Democrats	Peter Breakey	978	56.5	−0.5
Labour	David Hickling	523	30.2	+5.4
Conservative	James Bartle	229	13.2	−6.8
Majority		455	26.3	
Turnout		1,730		
Liberal Democrats hold		Swing		

=== Ouseburn ward ===
Ouseburn
Party	Candidate	Votes	%	±%
Liberal Democrats	Stephen Psallidas	908	50.6	−0.5
Labour	Norman Slater	643	35.9	+7.5
Green	Alastair Bonnett	170	9.5	−1.9
Conservative	Tom Grime	72	4.0	−5.2
Majority		265	14.8	
Turnout		1,793		
Liberal Democrats hold		Swing		

=== Parklands ward ===
Parklands
Party	Candidate	Votes	%	±%
Liberal Democrats	Pauline Allen	1,746	45.7	−19.1
Labour	Sheila Spencer	780	20.4	+9.2
Conservative	Neville Armstrong	484	12.7	−7.4
Newcastle First	Lynne Gee	177	4.6	N/A
Majority		966	25.3	
Turnout		3,817		
Liberal Democrats hold		Swing		

=== South Heaton ward ===
South Heaton
Party	Candidate	Votes	%	±%
Labour	Christopher Bartlett	1,188	69.4	+23.4
Green	Andrew Gray	210	12.3	+3.0
Liberal Democrats	Mark Nelson	158	9.2	−30.3
Conservative	Joshua Lambkin	81	4.7	−0.5
TUSC	Paul Phillips	74	4.3	N/A
Majority		978	57.1	
Turnout		1,711		
Labour hold		Swing		

=== South Jesmond ward ===
South Jesmond
Party	Candidate	Votes	%	±%
Labour	Felicity Mendelson	788	46.9	+26.5
Liberal Democrats	Christopher Boyle	502	29.9	−24.8
Green	Tony Waterson	210	12.5	N/A
Conservative	Jonjo Macnamara	179	10.7	−14.2
Majority		286	17.0	
Turnout		1,679		
Labour gain from Liberal Democrats		Swing		

=== Walker ward ===
Walker
Party	Candidate	Votes	%	±%
Labour	David Wood	1,950	83.2	+25.8
Newcastle First	Wendy Thackray	210	9.0	N/A
Liberal Democrats	Patrick Fancett	108	4.6	−15.1
Conservative	Joan Atkin	76	3.2	−3.6
Majority		1,740	74.2	
Turnout		2,344		
Labour hold		Swing		

=== Walkergate ward ===
Walkergate
Party	Candidate	Votes	%	±%
Labour	Tania Armstrong	1,912	68.1	+40.0
Liberal Democrats	David Besag	646	23.0	−32.5
Conservative	Marian McWilliams	149	5.3	−1.5
Communist	Martin Levy	102	3.6	N/A
Majority		1,266	45.1	
Turnout		2,809		
Labour gain from Liberal Democrats		Swing		

=== West Gosforth ward ===
West Gosforth
Party	Candidate	Votes	%	±%
Liberal Democrats	Nick Cott	1,508	48.6	−13.6
Labour	Margaret Murning	770	24.8	12.0
Conservative	Karen Jewers	568	18.3	−6.8
Green	Sandy Irvine	257	8.3	N/A
Majority		738	23.8	
Turnout		3,103		
Liberal Democrats hold		Swing		

=== Westerthorpe ward ===
In 2008, Marc Donnelly stood in this ward as the Liberal Democrat candidate. The change in percentage here for him is relative to then.

Westerthorpe
Party	Candidate	Votes	%	±%
Independent	Marc Donnelly	2,008	53.1	−0.5
Labour	Matt Coyle	853	22.5	+0.8
Newcastle First	Ernie Shorton	831	22.0	N/A
Conservative	Kevin O'Neill	92	2.4	−14.3
Majority		1,155	30.5	
Turnout		3,784		
Independent gain from Liberal Democrats		Swing		

=== Westgate ward ===
Westgate
Party	Candidate	Votes	%	±%
Labour	Nick Forbes	1,109	81.3	+16.6
Conservative	Thomas Cheney	143	10.5	−3.7
Liberal Democrats	Rachel Auld	112	8.2	−12.8
Majority		966	70.8	
Turnout		1,364		
Labour hold		Swing		

=== Wingrove ward ===
Wingrove
Party	Candidate	Votes	%	±%
Labour	Irim Ali	1,535	70.3	+27.2
Green	John Pearson	289	13.2	+5.0
Conservative	Joshua Chew	180	8.2	−3.3
Liberal Democrats	Claire Schofield	179	8.2	−28.9
Majority		1,246	57.1	
Turnout		2,183		
Labour hold		Swing		

=== Woolsington ward ===
Woolsington
Party	Candidate	Votes	%	±%
Labour	Sharon Pattison	1,740	66.2	+18.2
Liberal Democrats	Philip McArdle	453	17.2	−18.3
Newcastle First	Marilyn Riseborough	247	9.4	N/A
Conservative	William Holloway	188	7.2	−1.7
Majority		1,287	49.0	
Turnout		2,628		
Labour hold		Swing		
