= 2012 Stratford-on-Avon District Council election =

Election in England

Results of the 2012 Stratford-on-Avon District Council election

The 2012 Stratford-on-Avon District Council election took place on 3 May 2012 to elect members of Stratford-on-Avon Council in Warwickshire, England. This was on the same day as other 2012 United Kingdom local elections.
