= 2012 Walsall Metropolitan Borough Council election =

2012 UK local government election

Map of the results of the 2012 Walsall council election. Labour in red, Conservatives in blue, Liberal Democrats in yellow and independents in grey.

Elections for Walsall Council were held on Thursday, 3 May 2012. This was the same day as other 2012 United Kingdom local elections. As the council is elected by thirds, one seat in each of the wards was up for election.

== Election results ==
Walsall Council Election, 2012
Party	Seats	Gains	Losses	Net gain/loss	Seats %	Votes %	Votes	+/−
Labour	9	3	2	+1				
Conservative	7	0	3	-3				
Liberal Democrats	2	0	0	0				
Independent	2	2	0	+2				
UKIP	0	0	0	0				
BNP	0	0	0	0				
English Democrat	0	0	0	0				
Green	0	0	0	0				
TOTAL	20	5	5	0	100.0	100.0		

== Council composition ==
The composition of the council before the election and a summary of which parties' seats are up for election can be found in the following table:

Party	Previous council	Staying councillors	Seats up for election	Election result	New council
Labour	27	19	8	9	28
Conservatives	27	15	12	7	24
Liberal Democrats	5	3	2	2	5
Independents	1	1	0	2	3
Total	60	40	20	20	60

== Ward results ==
According to Walsall Council's website

Aldridge Central & South Ward
Party	Candidate	Votes	%	±%
Conservative	Thomas Gordon Ansell	1,602	49.88	
Labour	Michael Johnson	735	22.88	
UKIP	Russell Owen Armitage	517	16.10	
Liberal Democrats	Joanna Bridget Sheward	358	11.15	
Majority		867	26.99	
Turnout		3,212	26.51	
Conservative hold		Swing		

Aldridge North & Walsall Wood Ward
Party	Candidate	Votes	%	±%
Conservative	Keith Sears	1,348		
Labour	Robert Arthur Grainger	936		
Liberal Democrats	Mark Robert Greveson	163		
BNP	Terence Majorowicz	264		
Majority		412		
Turnout			29.23%	
Conservative hold		Swing		

Bentley & Darlaston North Ward
Party	Candidate	Votes	%	±%
Labour	Angela Underhill	1,811		
Conservative	Susan Allen	397		
Liberal Democrats	Sulaiman Uddin	136		
Majority		1,414		
Turnout			25.50%	
Labour hold		Swing		

Birchills-Leamore Ward
Party	Candidate	Votes	%	±%
Labour	Tina Joan Jukes	1,424		
Conservative	Chad Louis Pitt	274		
BNP	Robert William Ball	230		
English Democrat	Christopher Martin Newey	128		
Liberal Democrats	Matthew Conway Griffin	74		
Green	Leandra Lola Gebrakedan	59		
Majority		1,150		
Turnout			21.80%	
Labour hold		Swing		

Blakenall Ward
Party	Candidate	Votes	%	±%
Independent	Peter Edward Smith	1,025		
Labour Co-op	Ian Charles Robertson	1,012		
Conservative	Hilda Derry	201		
Majority		13		
Turnout			26.19%	
Independent gain from Labour		Swing		

Bloxwich East Ward
Party	Candidate	Votes	%	±%
Labour	Julie Fitzpatrick	1,282		
Independent	Leslie Alan Beeley	595		
Conservative	Peter John Hryhoruk	364		
Independent	Stephen John Baggott	70		
Majority		687		
Turnout			25.82%	
Labour hold		Swing		

Bloxwich West Ward
Party	Candidate	Votes	%	±%
Labour	Frederick James Westley	1,463		
Conservative	Abigail Pitt	888		
Independent	Michael Ronald Ross	250		
Liberal Democrats	Christine Cockayne	85		
Majority		575		
Turnout			27.38%	
Labour hold		Swing		

Brownhills Ward
Party	Candidate	Votes	%	±%
Labour	Steve Wade	1,233		
Conservative	Alan John Paul	1,087		
Liberal Democrats	Ian Martin Ryan	173		
Majority		146		
Turnout			26.19%	
Labour gain from Conservative		Swing		

Darlaston South Ward
Party	Candidate	Votes	%	±%
Independent	Chris Bott	1,353		
Labour	Graham Edward Wilkes	1,003		
Conservative	Michelle Louise Martin	139		
Majority		350		
Turnout			25.85%	
Independent gain from Labour		Swing		

Paddock Ward
Party	Candidate	Votes	%	±%
Conservative	Rose Martin	2,066		
Labour	Nasar Ali	1,763		
UKIP	Derek Bennett	444		
Liberal Democrats	Abdul Malik	75		
Majority		303		
Turnout			44.14%	
Conservative hold		Swing		

Palfrey Ward
Party	Candidate	Votes	%	±%
Labour	Victoria Whyte	1,880		
Conservative	Matloob Hussain	1,570		
Liberal Democrats	Saddat Hussain	302		
Majority		310		
Turnout			35.36%	
Labour gain from Conservative		Swing		

Pelsall Ward
Party	Candidate	Votes	%	±%
Conservative	Garry Perry	1,886		
Labour	Hugh Alpheus Stewart	658		
Liberal Democrats	Shirley Gwendoline Balgobin	122		
Majority		1,228		
Turnout			29.59%	
Conservative hold		Swing		

Pheasey Park Farm Ward
Party	Candidate	Votes	%	±%
Conservative	Adrian John Austin Andrew	1,351		
Labour	Patricia Susan Lane	967		
UKIP	Steven George Grey	517		
Majority		384		
Turnout			32.20%	
Conservative hold		Swing		

Pleck Ward
Party	Candidate	Votes	%	±%
Labour	Dennis Alfred Anson	2,137		
Conservative	Gazanfer Ali	878		
Independent	Mark Andrew Dabbs	220		
Liberal Democrats	Mohammed Yaqub	215		
Majority		1,259		
Turnout			34.58%	
Labour hold		Swing		

Rushall-Shelfield Ward
Party	Candidate	Votes	%	±%
Labour	Richard Vernon Worrall	1,233		
Conservative	Ronald Ernest George Carpenter	954		
UKIP	Timothy Neil Melville	284		
Liberal Democrats	Royston Mark Sheward	71		
Majority		279		
Turnout			27.59%	
Labour gain from Conservative		Swing		

Short Heath Ward
Party	Candidate	Votes	%	±%
Liberal Democrats	Doreen Shires	896		
Labour	Matthew Joseph Ward	801		
Conservative	Anne Elizabeth Ault	264		
UKIP	Darren Thomas Hazell	229		
English Democrat	Malcolm William Moore	151		
Majority		95		
Turnout			25.86%	
Liberal Democrats hold		Swing		

St. Matthew's Ward
Party	Candidate	Votes	%	±%
Conservative	Mohammed Arif	1,702		
Labour	Aftab Ahmad Nawaz	1,573		
UKIP	Kathleen Rita Oakley	437		
Liberal Democrats	Mozamil Khan	186		
Majority		129		
Turnout			38.30%	
Conservative hold		Swing		

Streetly Ward
Party	Candidate	Votes	%	±%
Conservative	Brian Alastair Douglas-Maul	1,829		
Labour	Steven King	757		
UKIP	Steven John Whitehouse	515		
Liberal Democrats	John Paul Garfitt	122		
Majority		1,072		
Turnout			29.30%	
Conservative hold		Swing		

Willenhall North Ward
Party	Candidate	Votes	%	±%
Liberal Democrats	Ian Shires	1,046		
Labour	Rosemary Cleaver	753		
UKIP	Elizabeth Anne Hazell	327		
Conservative	Clive Michael Ault	260		
English Democrat	Christopher Charles Edwin Haywood	94		
Majority		293		
Turnout			25.84%	
Liberal Democrats hold		Swing		

Willenhall South Ward
Party	Candidate	Votes	%	±%
Labour	Sean Patrick Coughlan	1696		
Conservative	Wendy Ann Sharp	361		
Liberal Democrats	Carol Edna May Fletcher	180		
Majority		1,335		
Turnout			20.41%	
Labour hold		Swing		
