= 2012 Rochdale Metropolitan Borough Council election =

2012 UK local government election

The 2012 Rochdale Council election took place on 3 May 2012 to elect members of Rochdale Metropolitan Borough Council in the North West of England. This was on the same day as other 2012 United Kingdom local elections. The Labour Party won 17 of the 20 seats with 53% of the vote, with the other three going to the Conservative Party with 27% of the vote. The Liberal Democrats lost all 11 of their seats up for re-election with 15% of the vote. This election marked the return to the council of former Leaders Richard Farnell and Allen Brett. It also produced Rochdale's youngest ever councillor in Liam O'Rourke.

These results also led to the resignation of local Liberal Democrat leader Wera Hobhouse.

After the election, the composition of the council was:

- Labour 42
- Conservative 13
- Liberal Democrat 5

== Election result ==
Rochdale local election result 2012
Party	Seats	Gains	Losses	Net gain/loss	Seats %	Votes %	Votes	+/−
Labour	15	7	0	+7		53.3	26,265	+2.5
Conservative	5	3	0	+3		26.6	13,140	+0.5
Liberal Democrats	0	0	10	-10		15.1	7,572	-2.3
UKIP	0	0	0	0		0.6	302	+0.6
English Democrat	0	0	0	0		0.4	215	+0.4
National Front	0	0	0	0		0.4	216	+0.1
Independent	0	0	0	0		0.6	302	-3.1

== Ward results ==
=== Balderstone & Kirkholt ward ===
Balderstone & Kirkholt
Party	Candidate	Votes	%	±%
Labour	Richard Farnell	1,582	65.8	+18.6
Liberal Democrats	Pat Colclough	638	26.6	−6.4
Conservative	Christine Akram	183	7.6	−5.0
Majority		944	39.3	+26.2
Turnout		2,403	33	+3
Labour gain from Liberal Democrats		Swing		

=== Bamford ward ===
Bamford
Party	Candidate	Votes	%	±%
Conservative	Jane Gartside	1,253	41.5	+2.0
Liberal Democrats	William Hobhouse	1,057	35.0	−2.7
Labour	Daniel Meredith	708	23.5	+0.7
Majority		196	6.5	+4.8
Turnout		3,018	39	
Conservative hold		Swing		

=== Castleton ward ===
Castleton
Party	Candidate	Votes	%	±%
Labour	Billy Sheerin	1,728	75.1	+26.4
Conservative	Ronald Crossley	313	13.6	−1.2
Liberal Democrats	Anthony Smith	259	11.3	−3.5
Majority		1,415	61.5	+35.6
Turnout		2,300	30	−3.0
Labour gain from Liberal Democrats		Swing		

=== Central Rochdale ward ===
Central Rochdale
Party	Candidate	Votes	%	±%
Labour	Iftikhar Ahmed	2,337	71.2	−4.3
Liberal Democrats	Mohammed Miah	665	20.3	+5.7
Conservative	Nauman Hayee	280	8.5	+0.9
Majority		1,672	49.4	−11.4
Turnout		3,382	43	−4
Labour gain from Liberal Democrats		Swing		

=== East Middleton ward ===
East Middleton
Party	Candidate	Votes	%	±%
Labour	Malcolm Boriss	1,439	72.9	+7.2
Conservative	David Smith	372	18.9	−3.5
Liberal Democrats	Clarice Cooper	162	8.2	−1.9
Majority		1,067	54.1	+9.1
Turnout		1,973	25	−3
Labour hold		Swing		

=== Healey ward ===
Healey
Party	Candidate	Votes	%	±%
Labour	Shaun O'Neill	1,251	45.3	+10.2
Conservative	Lee Durrant	1,137	41.1	+2.3
Liberal Democrats	Tom Bailey	376	13.6	−5.4
Majority		114	4.2	
Turnout		2,764	35	+1
Labour gain from Liberal Democrats		Swing		

=== Hopwood Hall ward ===
Hopwood Hall
Party	Candidate	Votes	%	±%
Labour	Linda Robinson	1,227	59.5	−5.2
Conservative	Peter Winkler	498	24.1	+0.1
National Front	Peter Greenwood	216	10.5	+10.5
Liberal Democrats	Georgina Whitaker	122	5.9	−5.4
Majority		729	35.3	−5.5
Turnout		2,063	25	−6
Labour hold		Swing		

=== Kingsway ward ===
Kingsway
Party	Candidate	Votes	%	±%
Labour	Shakil Ahmed	1,724	63.2	+2.8
Liberal Democrats	David Clayton	474	17.4	+1.0
Conservative	Rifat Mahmood	316	11.6	+0.5
English Democrat	Ricky Akehurst	215	7.9	+7.9
Majority		1,250	45.8	+1.8
Turnout		2,729	33	−1
Labour gain from Liberal Democrats		Swing		

=== Littleborough Lakeside ward ===
In 2008 Peter Evans stood in this ward as a Liberal Democrat.

Littleborough Lakeside
Party	Candidate	Votes	%	±%
Labour	John Hartley	1,081	50.7	+14.1
Conservative	Peter Evans	1,050	49.3	+9.9
Majority		31	1.4	
Turnout		2,131	28	−3
Labour gain from Liberal Democrats		Swing		

=== Milkstone & Deeplish ward ===
In 2008, Mohammad Sharif stood in this ward for the Liberal Democrats.

Milkstone & Deeplish
Party	Candidate	Votes	%	±%
Labour	Terence Linden	1,840	56.9	−7.1
Conservative	Mohammad Sharif	1,224	37.9	+19.7
Liberal Democrats	Liz Thirsk	169	5.2	+0.3
Majority		616	19.0	−26.9
Turnout		3,233	42	−4
Labour gain from Liberal Democrats		Swing		

=== Milnrow & Newhey ward ===
Milnrow & Newhey
Party	Candidate	Votes	%	±%
Labour	Allen Brett	1,200	45.3	+7.4
Liberal Democrats	Irene Davidson	1,046	39.5	+7.1
Conservative	Keith Taylor	402	15.2	−10.3
Majority		154	5.8	+0.3
Turnout		2,648	34	+2
Labour gain from Liberal Democrats		Swing		

=== Norden ward ===
Norden
Party	Candidate	Votes	%	±%
Conservative	James Gartside	1,624	67.6	+10.4
Labour	Dobir Miah	604	25.1	−1.6
Liberal Democrats	Natasha Akhtar	175	7.3	−8.8
Majority		1,020	42.4	+11.9
Turnout		2,403	31	−9
Conservative hold		Swing		

=== North Heywood ward ===
North Heywood
Party	Candidate	Votes	%	±%
Labour	Liam O'Rourke	1,193	55.4	+1.7
Liberal Democrats	Tony MacSparran	785	36.5	+14.1
Conservative	David Garnett	174	8.1	−3.5
Majority		408	19.0	−12.2
Turnout		2,152	28	n/c
Labour gain from Liberal Democrats		Swing		

=== North Middleton ward ===
Maureen Rowbothan stood for the ward in 2008 as a Labour candidate.

North Middleton
Party	Candidate	Votes	%	±%
Labour	Pat Greenall	883	44.4	−22.0
Independent	Maureen Rowbotham	694	34.9	+34.9
Conservative	David Harris	251	12.6	−11.7
Liberal Democrats	Neil Proctor	162	8.1	−1.3
Majority		189	9.5	−32.5
Turnout		1,990	25	+3
Labour hold		Swing		

=== Smallbridge & Firgrove ward ===
Jean Ashworth stood for the ward in 2008 as a Liberal Democrat.

Smallbridge & Firgrove
Party	Candidate	Votes	%	±%
Labour	Amna Mir	1,509	63.8	+7.2
Conservative	Jean Ashworth	654	27.7	+5.6
Liberal Democrats	Peter Clegg	201	8.5	−12.8
Majority		855	36.2	+1.8
Turnout		2,364	29	−1
Labour gain from Liberal Democrats		Swing		

=== South Middleton ward ===
South Middleton
Party	Candidate	Votes	%	±%
Labour	Peter Joinson	1,375	54.1	+1.2
Conservative	Teresa Fitzsimons	1,049	41.3	+0.4
Liberal Democrats	John Wilkins	119	4.7	−1.5
Majority		326	12.8	+0.8
Turnout		2,543	33	−5
Labour gain from Conservative		Swing		

=== Spotland & Falinge ward ===
Spotland & Falinge
Party	Candidate	Votes	%	±%
Labour	Shefali Begum	1,123	35.8	−3.7
Independent	Carl Faulkner	902	28.8	+9.8
Liberal Democrats	Mohammed Sajid	803	25.6	+0.3
Conservative	James Oldham	309	9.9	+0.0
Majority		221	7.0	−7.2
Turnout		3,137	39	+6
Labour gain from Liberal Democrats		Swing		

=== Wardle & West Littleborough ward ===
Wardle & West Littleborough
Party	Candidate	Votes	%	±%
Conservative	Ashley Dearnley	1,569	69.5	+5.6
Labour	James Brown	536	23.7	−4.6
Liberal Democrats	Rosemary Jones	153	6.8	−1.0
Majority		1,033	45.7	+10.1
Turnout		2,258	31	−6
Conservative hold		Swing		

=== West Heywood ward ===
West Heywood
Party	Candidate	Votes	%	±%
Labour	Colin Lambert	1,319	67.2	+0.0
UKIP	Warren Mitchell	302	15.4	+15.4
Conservative	Jane Howard	215	11.0	−12.1
Liberal Democrats	James Ridley	126	6.4	−3.3
Majority		1,017	51.8	+7.7
Turnout		1,962	23	−1
Labour hold		Swing		

=== West Middleton ward ===
West Middleton
Party	Candidate	Votes	%	±%
Labour	Lil Murphy	1,606	82.2	+6.0
Conservative	Christopher Chapman	267	13.7	−3.8
Liberal Democrats	Frank Cooper	80	4.1	−2.2
Majority		1,339	68.6	+9.8
Turnout		1,953	27	+4
Labour hold		Swing		
