= 2012 Warrington Borough Council election =

2012 UK local government election

2012 Warrington Borough Council Election
- 3 May 2012

19 of the 57 seats to Warrington Borough Council 30 seats needed for a majority
	First party	Second party	Third party
Party	Labour	Liberal Democrats	Conservative
Seats won	45	11	2
Seat change	▲7	▼5	▼2
Popular vote	22,665	7,004	8,766
Percentage	57.09	17.64	22.08
- Results of the 2012 Warrington Borough Council election
Council control before election
Labour Party (UK)
Council control after election
Labour Party (UK)

The 2012 Warrington Borough Council election took place on 3 May 2012 to elect 19 of the 57 members of the Warrington Borough Council in England. They comprised part of the United Kingdom's local elections of 2012.

== Results ==
Warrington Council Election, 2012
Party	Seats	Gains	Losses	Net gain/loss	Seats %	Votes %	Votes	+/−
Labour	41	7	0	+7	73	57.09	22,665	
Conservative	4	0	2	-2	7	22.08	8,766	
Liberal Democrats	12	0	5	-5	20	17.6	7,004	
BNP	0			Steady	0	0	0	
Green	0			Steady	0	0.02	700	
UKIP	0			Steady	0	0.01	563	

== Ward results ==
=== Appleton ===
Appleton
Party	Candidate	Votes	%	±%
Liberal Democrats	Brian Patrick Axcell	1660	52.2	+10.00
Conservative	Phil Marshall	1067	33.6	−38.85
Labour	Paul Carter	453	14.2	−30.83
Majority		593	18.6	
Turnout		3,245	38.1	
Liberal Democrats hold		Swing	+9.5	

=== Bewsey and Whitecross ===
Bewsey and Whitecross
Party	Candidate	Votes	%	±%
Labour	Jeff Richards	1,478	82.7	
Liberal Democrats	Judith Carol Wheeler	309	17.3	
Majority		1,169	65.4	
Turnout		1,787	20.3	
Labour hold		Swing	+9.5	

=== Birchwood ===
Birchwood
Party	Candidate	Votes	%	±%
Labour	Pauline Nelson	1663	67.8	
Conservative	Nigel Balding	633	25.8	
Liberal Democrats	Charlie Hulse	157	6.4	
Majority		1,030	42.0	
Turnout		2,453	29.9	
Labour hold		Swing	+9.5	

=== Burtonwood & Winwick ===
Burtonwood and Winwick
Party	Candidate	Votes	%	±%
Labour	Terry O'Neill	1,241	75.4	
Conservative	Stefan Krizanac	316	19.2	
Liberal Democrats	June Rios	89	5.4	
Majority		925	56.2	
Turnout		1,646	33.4	
Labour hold		Swing	+7.2	

=== Culceth Glazebury & Croft ===
Culceth Glazebury and Croft
Party	Candidate	Votes	%	±%
Labour	Chris Vobe	2,134	56.9	
Conservative	Keith Bland	1,350	36.0	
Liberal Democrats	Merril Cummerson	264	7.0	
Labour hold		Swing	+8.2	

=== Fairfield & Howley ===
Fairfield and Howley
Party	Candidate	Votes	%	±%
Labour	Kevin Bennett	1,505	76.4	
Green	Lyndsay McAteer	245	12.4	
Liberal Democrats	Nicola Jane Brent	220	11.2	
Majority		1,260	64.0	
Turnout		1,970	21.2	

=== Grappenhall & Thelwall ===
Grappenhall and Thelwall
Party	Candidate	Votes	%	±%
Liberal Democrats	Ted Finnegan	1,191	44.3	
Labour	Mark Andrew Littler	622	23.1	
Conservative	Roger Philip Cawthorne	615	22.9	
UKIP	Richard William Vaughan	168	6.2	
Green	Michael Victor Smith	94	3.5	
Majority		569	21.2	
Turnout		2,690	34.8	

=== Great Sankey South ===
Great Sankey South
Party	Candidate	Votes	%	±%
Labour	Tony Williams	1,507	67.9	
Conservative	Sam Baxter	370	16.7	
Liberal Democrats	Roy Alfred Smith	343	15.5	

=== Halton Stretton & Walton ===
Halton Stretton and Walton
Party	Candidate	Votes	%	±%
Conservative	Paul Kennedy	533	60.9	
Labour	John Edward Park	197	22.5	
Liberal Democrats	Dave Hockenhull	145	16.6	
Majority		336	38.4	
Turnout		875	35.5	

=== Lymm ===
Lymm
Party	Candidate	Votes	%	±%
Conservative	Sheila Elizabeth Woodyatt	1,458	40.1	
Labour	Su Williams	1,195	32.8	
Liberal Democrats	Graham Farrington Gowland	591	16.2	
UKIP	James Ashington	395	10.9	
Majority		263	7.2	
Turnout		3,639	38.0	

=== Orford ===
Orford
Party	Candidate	Votes	%	±%
Labour	Mike Hannon	1,517	88.0	
Liberal Democrats	John Davies	206	12.0	
Majority		1,311	30.9	
Turnout		1,723	22.1	

=== Penketh & Cuerdley ===
Penketh and Cuerdley
Party	Candidate	Votes	%	±%
Labour	Allin Dirir	1,603	63.5	
Conservative	Paul Campbell	824	32.6	
Liberal Democrats	Tim Price	97	3.8	

=== Poplars & Hulme ===
Poplars and Hulme
Party	Candidate	Votes	%	±%
Labour	Brian Maher	1,312	79.4	
Conservative	Helena Campbell	196	11.9	
Liberal Democrats	Iona Katrine Gillis	144	8.7	

=== Poulton North ===
Poulton North
Party	Candidate	Votes	%	±%
Labour	Billy Lines-Rowlands	1,226	54.0	
Liberal Democrats	Sandra Joan Bradshaw	802	35.3	
Conservative	Mark Chapman	241	10.6	

=== Poulton South ===
Poulton South
Party	Candidate	Votes	%	±%
Labour	Colin Froggatt	1,109	73.8	
Liberal Democrats	Jeff Butler	262	17.4	
Green	Eveline Johanna Van Der Steen	132	8.8	

=== Rixton & Woolston ===
Rixton and Woolston
Party	Candidate	Votes	%	±%
Labour	Tony McCarthy	1,446	66.6	
Conservative	Lilian Houghton	426	19.6	
Green	Ross Lloyd	208	9.6	
Liberal Democrats	Diana Grylls	90	4.1	

=== Stockton Heath ===
Stockton Heath
Party	Candidate	Votes	%	±%
Labour	Laurence James Murphy	664	36.0	
Conservative	Stephen Taylor	605	32.8	
Liberal Democrats	Ann Raymond	434	23.5	
Green	Kenneth Robin Wilson	140	7.6	

=== Westbrook ===
Westbrook
Party	Candidate	Votes	%	±%
Labour	Judith Mary Guthrie	674	49.4	
Liberal Democrats	David Ernest Earl	507	37.2	
Conservative	Michael Foxall	183	13.4	

=== Whittle Hall ===
Whittle Hall
Party	Candidate	Votes	%	±%
Labour	Will Hughes	1,119	45.3	
Liberal Democrats	Kevin Reynolds	865	35.0	
Conservative	Jonathan Levy	361	14.6	
Green	Stephanie Davies	126	5.1	
