= 2012 Elmbridge Borough Council election =

2012 UK local government election

Results of the 2012 Elmbridge Borough Council election

The 2012 Elmbridge Council election took place on 3 May 2012 to elect members of Elmbridge Council in England. This was on the same day as other 2012 United Kingdom local elections.

== Background ==
The Residents' Group on Elmbridge Borough Council was made up of Esher Residents' Association, Hersham Village Society, Molesey Residents' Association, St George's Hill Independents, Thames Ditton & Weston Green Residents' Association and The Walton Society. The colour of the residents/societys/independents in Elmbridge was Green not grey as shown on these pages.

== Esher Ward ==
The election in the Esher ward was due to take place on 3 May but was postponed due to the death of the Labour candidate Bruce King. The delayed election took place on 21 June 2012.

== Election results ==
Elmbridge Borough Council election, 2012
Party	Seats	Gains	Losses	Net gain/loss	Seats %	Votes %	Votes	+/−
Conservative								
Labour								
Liberal Democrats								
Monster Raving Loony	0							
Residents								
UKIP	0						137	
Independent								

== Ward results ==
Claygate Ward Result 3 May 2012
Party	Candidate	Votes	%	±%
UKIP	Bernard Collingnon	107	4.46	
Liberal Democrats	Alex Coomes	1253	52.21	
Labour	Sheila Francis	109	4.54	
Independent	Richard Hunt	61	2.54	
Conservative	PJ Warren	890	37.08	
Majority		363		
Turnout		2420	44	
		Swing		

Cobham and Downside Ward Result 3 May 2012
Party	Candidate	Votes	%	±%
Liberal Democrats	David Bellchamber	240		
Conservative	John Butcher	1001		
Labour	Irene Threlkeld	143		
Majority		761		
Turnout		1384	28	
		Swing		

Cobham Fairmile Ward Result 3 May 2012
Party	Candidate	Votes	%	±%
Conservative	James Browne	573		
Labour	Steven Gray	85		
Liberal Democrats	Michael Smith	78		
Majority		488		
Turnout		736	23	
		Swing		

Esher Ward Result 21 June 2012
Party	Candidate	Votes	%	±%
Labour	Mick Moriarty	91		
Residents	Gary Lay	665		
UKIP	Dennis Hill	30		
Conservative	Tim Oliver	711		
Majority		46		
Turnout		4895	36	
		Swing		

Hersham North Ward Result 3 May 2012
Party	Candidate	Votes	%	±%
Residents	Roy Green	636		
Labour	Kevin Hamilton	261		
Conservative	Malcolm Howard	568		
Majority		68		
Turnout		1465	31	
		Swing		

Hersham South Ward Result 3 May 2012
Party	Candidate	Votes	%	±%
Residents	Doug Clark	602		
Labour	Mark Gower	166		
Conservative	John O'Reilly	934		
Liberal Democrats	Andrew Sturgis	96		
Majority		332		
Turnout		1798	37	
		Swing		

Long Ditton Ward Result 3 May 2012
Party	Candidate	Votes	%	±%
Conservative	Jake Delaney	888		
Labour	Roger Hughes	151		
Liberal Democrats	Toni Izard	916		
Majority		28		
Turnout		1955	41	
		Swing		

Molesey East Ward Result 3 May 2012
Party	Candidate	Votes	%	±%
Monster Raving Loony	'Badger'	1		
Conservative	Steve Bax	807	42	+16
Monster Raving Loony	'Bone'	13		
Monster Raving Loony	'Chinners'	21	1	−2
Residents	Nigel Cooper	914	48	−21
Monster Raving Loony	'Crazy Dave'	4		
Labour	Ben Griffin	101	5	N/A
Monster Raving Loony	'Large'	2		
Monster Raving Loony	'Monkey the Drummer'	3		
Monster Raving Loony	'Pee Gee Tips'	5		
Monster Raving Loony	'Scunny'	3		
Monster Raving Loony	SMFMusic Lab	5		
Majority		107	5	−37
Turnout		1879	38	−8
Residents hold		Swing	-37	

Molesey North Ward Result 3 May 2012
Party	Candidate	Votes	%	±%
Conservative	James Lee	173	10	−6
Residents	Liz Robertson	1383	85	+9
Liberal Democrats	Alastair Sturgis	68	4	−0.6
Majority		1210	74	+15
Turnout		1624	34	−9
Residents hold		Swing	+15	

Molesey South Ward Result 3 May 2012
Party	Candidate	Votes	%	±%
Conservative	Pat Cotter	138	9	−1
Labour	Rita Drummond	179	12	+2
Residents	Vic Eldridge	1015	73	+1
Liberal Democrats	Paul Nagle	49	3	+1
Majority		836	60	N/C
Turnout		1381	27	−12
Residents hold		Swing	+1	

Oatlands Park Ward Result 3 May 2012
Party	Candidate	Votes	%	±%
Labour	Lee Godfrey	222		
Liberal Democrats	Vicki MacLeod	197		
Conservative	Lorraine Samuels	1049		
Majority		827		
Turnout		1468	30	
		Swing		

Oxshott and Stoke d'Abernon Ward Result 3 May 2012
Party	Candidate	Votes	%	±%
Conservative	Jan Fuller	1220		
Labour	Carolyn Gray	113		
Liberal Democrats	David Loader	134		
Majority		1086		
Turnout		1467	30	
		Swing		

St George's Hill Ward Result 3 May 2012
Party	Candidate	Votes	%	±%
Residents	Brian Fairclough	836		
Conservative	Simon Foale	666		
Labour	Martin Lister	86		
Majority		170		
Turnout		1588	33	
		Swing		

Thames Ditton Ward Result 3 May 2012
Party	Candidate	Votes	%	±%
Labour	Francis Eldergill	138		
Conservative	Hugh Evans	304		
Residents	Ruth Lyon	1212		
Majority		908		
Turnout		1654	34	
		Swing		

Walton Central Ward Result 3 May 2012
Party	Candidate	Votes	%	±%
Conservative	Lewis Brown	766		
Residents	Neil Luxton	1031		
Labour	Graham Smith	138		
Majority		265		
Turnout		1935	37	
		Swing		

Walton North Ward Result 3 May 2012
Party	Candidate	Votes	%	±%
Conservative	Barbara Cowin	578		
Labour	Peter Hawkes	291		
Liberal Democrats	Alexander Stringer	192		
Majority		287		
Turnout		1061	22	
		Swing		

Walton South Ward Result 3 May 2012
Party	Candidate	Votes	%	±%
Residents	Mike Collins	528		
Liberal Democrats	Sereena Davey	76		
Conservative	Stuart Hawkins	834		
Labour	Caroline Ingram	141		
Majority		366		
Turnout		1579	31	
		Swing		

Weston Green Ward Result 3 May 2012
Party	Candidate	Votes	%	±%
Residents	Ruth Bruce	914		
Conservative	Christian Mahne	254		
Majority		660		
Turnout		1168	41	
		Swing		

Weybridge North Ward Result 3 May 2012
Party	Candidate	Votes	%	±%
Conservative	Ajoy Bose-Mallick	349		
Liberal Democrats	Andrew Davis	547		
Labour	Robert Evans	147		
Majority		198		
Turnout		1043	32	
		Swing		

Weybridge South Ward Result 3 May 2012
Party	Candidate	Votes	%	±%
Liberal Democrats	Susan Bohane	173		
Conservative	Glenn Dearlove	638		
Labour	Shelia Millington	107		
Majority		465		
Turnout		918	28	
		Swing		
