= 2012 Rotherham Metropolitan Borough Council election =

2012 UK local government election

Results of the 2012 Rotherham Metropolitan Borough Council election

The 2012 Rotherham Metropolitan Borough Council election took place on 3 May 2012 to elect members of Rotherham Metropolitan Borough Council in South Yorkshire, England. This was on the same day as other 2012 United Kingdom local elections. The Labour Party gained five seats, and one was gained by an Independent. The British National Party lost both of the seats it was defending, and the Conservative Party only held one of its five seats, in Sitwell ward.

== Ward results ==
=== Anston & Woodsetts ward ===
Anston & Woodsetts
Party	Candidate	Votes	%	±%
Independent	Clive Jepson	1,249	40.6	N/A
Labour	Darren Hughes	1,156	37.6	+3.3
Conservative	Doris Hunter	428	13.9	−35.5
Green	Charles Foulstone	240	7.8	N/A
Majority		93	3.0	
Turnout		3,079	34.7	
Independent gain from Conservative		Swing		

=== Boston Castle ward ===
Boston Castle
Party	Candidate	Votes	%	±%
Labour	Mahroof Hussain MBE	2,141	58.2	+15.3
UKIP	Harry Woffenden	654	17.8	+2.9
Conservative	Christian Kramer	499	13.6	−11.5
TUSC	Christopher Bingham	189	5.1	N/A
Liberal Democrats	Mohammed Meharban	134	3.6	−13.5
Monster Raving Loony	Omar Mehban	64	1.7	N/A
Majority		1,487	40.4	
Turnout		3,696	39.5	
Labour hold		Swing		

=== Brinsworth & Catcliffe ward ===
Brinsworth & Catcliffe
Party	Candidate	Votes	%	±%
Labour	Shabana Ahmed	1,618	54.8	+15.8
BNP	Terry Fieldhouse	872	22.1	−18.7
Conservative	Michael Cook	461	15.6	−4.6
Majority		746	25.3	
Turnout		2,970	32.7	
Labour gain from BNP		Swing		

=== Dinnington ward ===
Dinnington
Party	Candidate	Votes	%	±%
Labour	Simon Tweed	1,384	54.2	+18.7
UKIP	Denise Hickson	454	17.8	+2.8
Independent	David Smith	416	16.3	N/A
Conservative	Patricia Beighton	400	15.7	−15.6
Majority		930	36.4	
Turnout		2,662	28.2	
Labour hold		Swing		

=== Hellaby ward ===
Hellaby
Party	Candidate	Votes	%	±%
Labour	Lauren Astbury	1,257	41.7	+18.9
Conservative	Richard Turner	1,064	35.3	−20.0
UKIP	Douglas Fairfax	691	22.9	+1.0
Majority		193	6.4	
Turnout		3,032	32.9	
Labour gain from Conservative		Swing		

=== Holderness ward ===
Hilda Jack stood in this ward as a Labour Party candidate in 2008.

Holderness
Party	Candidate	Votes	%	±%
Labour	Christopher Robinson	1,529	51.3	+9.3
Independent	Hilda Jack	942	30.2	−11.8
Conservative	Keith Hunter	421	14.1	−11.4
Majority		587	19.7	
Turnout		2,904	30.2	
Labour hold		Swing		

=== Hoober ward ===
Hoober
Party	Candidate	Votes	%	±%
Labour	David Roche	1,530	60.9	+11.8
UKIP	Michael Pallant	644	25.6	+6.6
Conservative	Brian Taylor	338	13.5	−18.4
Majority		886	35.3	
Turnout		2,528	27.7	
Labour hold		Swing		

=== Keppel ward ===
Keppel
Party	Candidate	Votes	%	±%
Labour	Margaret Clark	1,818	66.3	+33.7
Liberal Democrats	Janice Middleton	469	17.1	−1.3
Conservative	Michael Robinson	454	16.6	−5.5
Majority		1,349	49.2	
Turnout		2,787	30.3	
Labour hold		Swing		

=== Maltby ward ===
Maltby
Party	Candidate	Votes	%	±%
Labour	Margaret Godfrey	1,285	50.0	+27.5
Independent	Michael Conlon	699	27.2	N/A
BNP	William Blair	435	16.9	−6.2
Conservative	Richard Price	150	5.8	−3.1
Majority		586	22.8	
Turnout		2,580	28.8	
Labour gain from BNP		Swing		

=== Rawmarsh ward ===
Rawmarsh
Party	Candidate	Votes	%	±%
Labour	Glyn Whelbourn	1,685	59.1	+8.4
BNP	William Baldwin	531	18.6	N/A
Conservative	Beryl Brown	328	11.5	−13.5
Majority		1,154	40.5	
Turnout		2,567	26.8	
Labour hold		Swing		

=== Rother Vale ward ===
Rother Vale
Party	Candidate	Votes	%	±%
Labour	Denise Lelliott	1,503	62.8	+19.7
UKIP	Gordon Brown	583	24.4	−4.2
Conservative	Andrew Frith	307	12.8	−15.6
Majority		920	38.4	
Turnout		2,406	26.4	
Labour hold		Swing		

=== Rotherham East ward ===
Rotherham East
Party	Candidate	Votes	%	±%
Labour	Emma Wallis	1,520	54.7	+10.3
UKIP	Maureen Vines	385	13.9	−5.2
Conservative	Mohammed Suleman	362	13.0	−0.4
Liberal Democrats	Mohammed Ilyas	207	7.5	−15.6
Green	Richard Penycate	171	6.2	N/A
Independent	Christopher Willis	132	4.8	N/A
Majority		1,135	40.9	
Turnout		2,788	30.7	
Labour hold		Swing		

=== Rotherham West ward ===
In 2008, Caven Vines stood in this ward as an Independent candidate.

Rotheram West
Party	Candidate	Votes	%	±%
Labour	Kathryn Sims	1,820	62.3	+23.4
UKIP	Caven Vines	758	25.9	−4.4
Conservative	Anne Middleton	212	7.3	−4.9
Liberal Democrats	Azeem Khan	133	4.6	N/A
Majority		1,062	36.3	
Turnout		2,933	31.3	
Labour hold		Swing		

=== Silverwood ward ===
Silverwood
Party	Candidate	Votes	%	±%
Labour	Gwendoline Russell	1,393	48.0	+14.6
UKIP	John Wilkinson	1,140	39.3	+10.5
Conservative	Peter Higgins	371	12.8	−16.1
Majority		253	8.7	
Turnout		2,916	30.5	
Labour hold		Swing		

=== Sitwell ward ===
Sitwell
Party	Candidate	Votes	%	±%
Conservative	Christopher Middleton	1,474	40.0	−18.5
Labour	Tajamal Khan	1,193	32.4	+12.8
UKIP	Valerie Wilkinson	1,019	27.6	N/A
Majority		281	7.6	
Turnout		3,705	39.3	
Conservative hold		Swing		

=== Swinton ward ===
Swinton
Party	Candidate	Votes	%	±%
Labour	Kenneth Wyatt	1,886	63.5	+19.4
UKIP	Shaun O'Dell	852	28.7	−4.5
Conservative	Stephen Jones	232	7.8	−14.9
Majority		1,034	34.8	
Turnout		2,977	33.3	
Labour hold		Swing		

=== Valley ward ===
Valley
Party	Candidate	Votes	%	±%
Labour	Simon Currie	1,667	65.3	+31.5
Conservative	Brian Cutts	490	19.2	−3.7
BNP	Jason Pearson	395	15.5	−12.5
Majority		1,177	46.1	
Turnout		2,572	28.0	
Labour hold		Swing		

=== Wales ward ===
Wales
Party	Candidate	Votes	%	±%
Labour	Gordon Watson	1,837	65.9	+40.9
Conservative	Valerie Todd	951	34.1	−9.9
Majority		886	31.8	
Turnout		2,818	32.6	
Labour gain from Conservative		Swing		

=== Wath ward ===
Wath
Party	Candidate	Votes	%	±%
Labour	Alan Gosling	1,805	60.1	+10.7
UKIP	Brian Bailey	930	31.0	+2.5
Conservative	Linda Higgins	266	8.9	−13.1
Majority		875	29.2	
Turnout		3,008	32.4	
Labour hold		Swing		

=== Wickersley ward ===
Wickersley
Party	Candidate	Votes	%	±%
Labour	Emma Hoddinott	1,833	56.2	+20.2
UKIP	Tina Dowdall	830	25.4	+0.2
Conservative	Martyn Parker	600	18.4	−20.4
Majority		1,003	30.7	
Turnout		3,271	35.1	
Labour gain from Conservative		Swing		

=== Wingfield ward ===
Wingfield
Party	Candidate	Votes	%	±%
Labour	Lindsay Johnston	1,564	62.0	+26.8
BNP	Marlene Guest	720	28.5	−2.9
Conservative	Kenneth Marshall	240	9.5	−4.1
Majority		844	33.4	
Turnout		2,536	27.9	
Labour hold		Swing		
