= 2012 Stroud District Council election =

2012 UK local government election

Results of the 2012 Stroud District Council election

The 2012 Stroud Council election was on 3 May 2012 to elect members of the Stroud District Council. Eighteen seats were up for grabs and the Conservative Party won nine.

== Election result ==
Stroud District Council election, 2012
Party	Seats	Gains	Losses	Net gain/loss	Seats %	Votes %	Votes	+/−
Conservative	9				50.00	41.40	10,333	
Labour	7				38.90	33.40	8,339	
Green	0				0.00	14.40	3,594	
Liberal Democrats	2				5.56	10.20	2,538	
TUSC	0				0.00	0.60	152	

== Ward results ==
Amberley and Woodchester (1 councillor)
Party	Candidate	Votes	%	±%
Green	Uta Baldauf	117	15.9%	
Labour	Sarah Madley	176	23.8%	
Conservative	Margaret Wigzell	445	60.30%	
Majority		445	60.30%	+8.52%
Turnout		748	41.60%	−1.70%

Berkeley (1 councillor)
Party	Candidate	Votes	%	±%
Labour	Elizabeth Ashton	753	54.8%	
Conservative	John Stanton	620	45.20%	+14.81%
Majority		753	54.85%	+6.60%
Turnout		1,373	41.00%	−31.00%

Cainscross (1 councillor)
Party	Candidate	Votes	%	±%
Liberal Democrats	Sylvia Bridgland	105	5.66%	−2.28%
Green	Oliver Kirkham	212	11.42%	
TUSC	Christopher Moore	152	8.19%	
Conservative	Deborah Westgate	495	26.66%	
Labour	Thomas Williams	893	48.09%	
Majority		893	48.09%	−3.69%
Turnout		1,857	41.60%	−1.70%

Chalford (1 councillor)
Party	Candidate	Votes	%	±%
Green	Richard Dean	381	21.10%	
Labour	David Taylor	481	26.61%	
Conservative	Deborah Young	945	52.30%	
Majority		945	52.30%	+26.61%
Turnout		1,807	35.60%	−16.10%

Dursley (1 councillor)
Party	Candidate	Votes	%	±%
Labour	Doina Cornell	880	51.80%	
Liberal Democrats	Michael Stayte	277	16.30%	
Conservative	Alexander Stennett	543	31.90%	
Majority		880	51.80%	+5.90%
Turnout		1,700	33.10%	−10.40%

Eastington and Standish (1 councillor)
Party	Candidate	Votes	%	±%
Green	Gerald Hartley	62	9.10%	
Conservative	Richard James	271	39.80%	
Labour	David Stephens	348	51.10%	
Majority		348	51.10%	
Turnout		681	45.40%	

Hardwicke (1 councillor)
Party	Candidate	Votes	%	±%
Labour	Ian Butler	533	43.40%	
Conservative	Russell Miles	564	45.90%	
Green	Sally Pickering	131	10.70%	
Majority		564	45.90%	−17.20%
Turnout		1,228	31.80%	−36.00%

Kingswood (1 councillor)
Party	Candidate	Votes	%	±%
Conservative	Henry Carr	150	27.40%	
Liberal Democrats	Paul Hemming	332	60.70%	
Labour	Joan Moore	65	11.90%	
Majority		332	60.70%	
Turnout		547	33.30%	

Minchinhampton (1 councillor)
Party	Candidate	Votes	%	±%
Labour	Christopher Holtom	213	14.40%	
Conservative	Nicholas Hurst	858	57.90%	
Green	John Williams	412	27.80%	+10.10%
Majority		858	57.90%	+2.40%
Turnout		1,483	41.30%	−14.70%

Nailsworth (1 councillor)
Party	Candidate	Votes	%	±%
Liberal Democrats	Stephen Dechan	72	3.60%	
Green	Catherine Farrell	676	33.70%	+20.36%
Conservative	Emma Sims	789	39.30%	
Labour	Audrey Smith	471	23.50%	+10.58%
Majority		789	39.30%	+0.46%
Turnout		2,008	37.50%	−14.40%

Painswick (1 councillor)
Party	Candidate	Votes	%	±%
Conservative	Nigel Cooper	981	63.50%	
Labour	Sheila McGrath	204	13.20%	
Green	Graham Spencer	360	23.30%	
Majority		981	63.50%	+4.60%
Turnout		1,545	42.60%	−37.90%

Rodborough (1 councillor)
Party	Candidate	Votes	%	±%
Green	Philip Blomberg	205	12.80%	+1.40%
Conservative	Rodger Cuddington	333	20.70%	
Liberal Democrats	Christine Headley	490	30.50%	−1.00%
Labour	Stephen Moore	579	36.00%	
Majority		579	36.00%	+3.10%
Turnout		1,607	53.90%	+2.40%

Severn (1 councillor)
Party	Candidate	Votes	%	±%
Labour	John Greenwood	296	21.70%	
Green	Susan Hartley	145	10.60%	
Liberal Democrats	John Howe	212	15.60%	
Conservative	Haydn Jones	707	52.10%	
Majority		709	52.10%	
Turnout		1,362	36.00%	

Stonehouse (1 councillor)
Party	Candidate	Votes	%	±%
Conservative	Philip Bevan	537	28.00%	
Labour	Mattie Ross	1,151	59.90%	
Green	Clare Sheridan	233	12.10%	−0.70%
Majority		1,151	59.90%	+4.90%
Turnout		1,921	31.50%	−9.50%

The Stanleys (1 councillor)
Party	Candidate	Votes	%	±%
Conservative	Lawrence Hall	507	37.10%	
Green	Nicola Hillary	236	17.30%	+0.80%
Labour	Stephen Lydon	582	42.50%	+18.80%
Liberal Democrats	Myles Robinson	43	3.10%	
Majority		582	42.50%	+4.90%
Turnout		1,368	41.60%	−34.90%

Upton St. Leonards (1 councillor)
Party	Candidate	Votes	%	±%
Green	Peter Adams	130	16.00%	
Labour	Thomas Lydon	132	16.20%	
Conservative	Keith Pearson	552	67.80%	
Majority		552	67.80%	
Turnout		814	34.80%	

Wotton-Under-Edge (1 councillor)
Party	Candidate	Votes	%	±%
Labour	C Burling	413	21.00%	
Liberal Democrats	J Cordwell	1,007	51.30%	
Conservative	Richard Williams	543	27.70%	
Majority		1,007	51.30%	+5.80%
Turnout		1,963	38.40%	−14.10%
