= 2012 Purbeck District Council election =

2012 UK local government election

Map of the results of the 2012 Purbeck District Council election. Conservatives in blue and Liberal Democrats in yellow. Wards in grey were not contested.

The 2012 Purbeck District Council election to the Purbeck District Council in Dorset took place on Thursday 3 May 2012.

== Election result ==
Purbeck election result 2012
Party	Seats	Gains	Losses	Net gain/loss	Seats %	Votes %	Votes	+/−
Conservative								
Labour								
Liberal Democrats								

== Ward results ==
Lychett Matravers
Party	Candidate	Votes	%	±%
Liberal Democrats	John Taylor	623		
Conservative	Ian Maitland	588		
Rejected ballots		9		
Majority		35		
Turnout		1,220	40.49	
Liberal Democrats hold		Swing		

Lychett Minster and Upton East
Party	Candidate	Votes	%	±%
Liberal Democrats	Carol Tilling	528		
Conservative	Clair Pipe	384		
Rejected ballots		19		
Majority		144		
Turnout		931	29.62	
Liberal Democrats hold		Swing		

Lychett Minster and Upton West
Party	Candidate	Votes	%	±%
Conservative	Paul Johns	618		
Liberal Democrats	Andrew Starr	455		
Rejected ballots		15		
Majority		163		
Turnout		1,088	35.98	
Conservative hold		Swing		

St. Martin
Party	Candidate	Votes	%	±%
Liberal Democrats	Beryl Ezzard	511		
Conservative	Dean Hutton	265		
Rejected ballots		13		
Majority		246		
Turnout		789	36.41	
Liberal Democrats hold		Swing		

Swanage North
Party	Candidate	Votes	%	±%
Conservative	Gloria Marsh	778		
Liberal Democrats	Peter Clark	273		
Labour	Lorie Harding	231		
Rejected ballots		11		
Majority		505		
Turnout		1,293	38.79	
Conservative hold		Swing		

Swanage South
Party	Candidate	Votes	%	±%
Conservative	Alison Patrick	784		
Labour Co-op	Rupert Roker	570		
Liberal Democrats	Mike Hadley	250		
Rejected ballots		13		
Majority		214		
Turnout		1,618	34.08	
Conservative hold		Swing		

Wareham
Party	Candidate	Votes	%	±%
Liberal Democrats	Keith Critchley	954		
Conservative	Mike Wiggins	719		
Rejected ballots		29		
Majority		235		
Turnout		1,703	37.43	
Liberal Democrats hold		Swing		

Wool
Party	Candidate	Votes	%	±%
Liberal Democrats	Graham Holmes	596		
Conservative	Richard Ley	366		
Labour	Tom Holmes	142		
Rejected ballots		13		
Majority		230		
Turnout		1,117	29.80	
Liberal Democrats hold		Swing		
