= 2012 Halton Borough Council election =

2012 UK local government election

Results of the 2012 Halton Borough Council election

The 2012 Halton Borough Council election was held on 3 May 2012 to elect members of Halton Borough Council in England.
