= 2012 Broxbourne Borough Council election =

2012 UK local government election

The Broxbourne Council election, 2012 was held on 3 May 2012 to elect council members of the Broxbourne Borough Council, the local government authority of the borough of Broxbourne, Hertfordshire, England.

This was a whole council election in which all of the 30 council seats in the 10 new wards were contested.

== New ward names ==
The 10 new wards created under the 2011 LGBCE review were named:

- Broxbourne & Hoddesdon South
- Cheshunt North
- Cheshunt South & Theobalds
- Flamstead End
- Goffs Oak
- Hoddesdon North
- Hoddesdon Town & Rye Park
- Rosedale & Bury Green
- Waltham Cross
- Wormley & Turnford

== Composition of expiring seats before election ==
| Old Ward | Party | Incumbent Elected | Incumbent | Standing again? | New Ward |
|---|---|---|---|---|---|
| Broxbourne | Conservative | 2008 | Paul Mason | Yes | Broxbourne & Hoddesdon South |
| Broxbourne | Conservative | 2010 | Sheila Benford | Yes | Waltham Cross |
| Broxbourne | Conservative | 2011 | Edward Rowland | Yes | Broxbourne & Hoddesdon South |
| Bury Green | Conservative | 2008 | Martin Kennaugh | No | Not Applicable |
| Bury Green | Conservative | 2010 | Martin Greensmyth | Yes | Rosedale & Bury Green |
| Bury Green | Conservative | 2011 | Hazel Jackson | Yes | Rosedale & Bury Green |
| Cheshunt Central | Conservative | 2008 | Judith Clemerson | No | Not Applicable |
| Cheshunt Central | Conservative | 2011 | Ray Hannam | Yes | Cheshunt North |
| Cheshunt Central | Conservative | 2011 | Tony Siracusa | Yes | Cheshunt South & Theobalds |
| Cheshunt North | Conservative | 2008 | Richard Clemerson | No | Not Applicable |
| Cheshunt North | Conservative | 2010 | Gary Clark | No | Not Applicable |
| Cheshunt North | Conservative | 2011 | Nick Hart | Yes | Cheshunt North |
| Flamstead End | Conservative | 2008 | Martin Lyth | No | Not Applicable |
| Flamstead End | Conservative | 2010 | Paul Seeby | Yes | Flamstead End |
| Flamstead End | Conservative | 2011 | Sue Ball-Greenwood | Yes | Flamstead End |
| Goffs Oak | Conservative | 2008 | Peter Moule | Yes | Goffs Oak |
| Goffs Oak | Conservative | 2010 | Mark Mills-Bishop | Yes | Goffs Oak |
| Goffs Oak | Conservative | 2011 | Jeremy Pearce | Yes | Goffs Oak |
| Hoddesdon North | Conservative | 2008 | Evelyn White | Yes | Hoddesdon North |
| Hoddesdon North | Conservative | 2010 | Keith Brown | Yes | Hoddesdon North |
| Hoddesdon North | Conservative | 2011 | Justin Evans | Yes | Hoddesdon North |
| Hoddesdon Town | Conservative | 2008 | Bob Bick | Yes | Wormley & Turnford |
| Hoddesdon Town | Conservative | 2010 | Kenneth Ayling | Yes | Hoddesdon Town & Rye Park |
| Hoddesdon Town | Conservative | 2011 | Brian Hill | No | Not Applicable |
| Rosedale | Conservative | 2010 | David Lewis | No | Not Applicable |
| Rosedale | Conservative | 2011 | Dee Hart | Yes | Flamstead End |
| Rye Park | Conservative | 2008 | Bren Perryman | Yes | Hoddesdon Town & Rye Park |
| Rye Park | Conservative | 2010 | Keith Bellamy | No | Not Applicable |
| Rye Park | Conservative | 2011 | Tony Infantino | Yes | Hoddesdon Town & Rye Park |
| Theobalds | Conservative | 2008 | Charles Tranham | No | Not Applicable |
| Theobalds | Conservative | 2010 | Carol Crump-Eynon | Yes | Cheshunt South & Theobalds |
| Theobalds | Conservative | 2011 | Norman Ames | No | Not Applicable |
| Waltham Cross | Labour | 2008 | Michael Watson | Yes | Waltham Cross |
| Waltham Cross | Labour | 2010 | Malcolm Aitken | Yes | Waltham Cross |
| Waltham Cross | Labour | 2011 | Neil Harvey | Yes | Waltham Cross |
| Wormley Turnford | Conservative | 2008 | James Metcalf | Yes | Wormley & Turnford |
| Wormley Turnford | Conservative | 2010 | Gordon Nicholson | Yes | Wormley & Turnford |
| Wormley Turnford | Conservative | 2011 | Anna Pilikos | No | Not Applicable |

== Election results ==
Broxbourne local election result 2012
| Party | Seats | Gains | Losses | Net gain/loss | Seats % | Votes % | Votes | +/− |
|---|---|---|---|---|---|---|---|---|
| Conservative | 27 | 27 | 0 | +27 | 90.00 | 64.40 | 10,933 | +1.31% |
| Labour | 3 | 3 | 0 | +3 | 10.00 | 26.14 | 4,438 | -0.01% |
| UKIP | 0 | 0 | 0 | 0 | 0 | 5.80 | 984 | +3.42% |
| Liberal Democrats | 0 | 0 | 0 | 0 | 0 | 3.66 | 621 | +1.94% |
| English Democrat | 0 | 0 | 0 | 0 | 0 | 0 | 0 | -4.73% |

- Number of votes per party derived from the party candidate receiving the highest number of votes in each ward

== Results summary ==
An election was held in all 10 of the newly created wards on Thursday 3 May 2012.

The Conservatives retained control of the council winning 27 of the 30 seats.

Labour managed to retain 3 seats in Waltham Cross ward albeit with reduced majorities compared with 2011.

The new political balance of the council following this election was:

- Conservative 27 seats
- Labour 3 seats

== Broxbourne Council Cabinet 2012 – 2013 ==
| Name | Portfolio | Ward |
|---|---|---|
| Paul Mason | Leader of the Council | Broxbourne and Hoddesdon South |
| Ray Hannam | Public & Environmental Protection & Deputy Leader of the Council | Cheshunt North |
| Hazel Jackson | Leisure & Recreation | Rosedale & Bury Green |
| Jim Metcalf | Planning & Regeneration | Wormley & Turnford |
| Paul Seeby | Housing & Community Development | Flamstead End |
| Mark Mills-Bishop | Finance & Corporate Services | Goffs Oak |

== Ward results ==
Broxbourne & Hoddesdon South
| Party | Candidate | Votes | % | ±% |
|---|---|---|---|---|
| Conservative | Eddy Rowlands | 1,325 | 22.62 | |
| Conservative | Tim Hutchings | 1,276 | 21.78 | |
| Conservative | Paul Mason | 1,214 | 20.72 | |
| Labour | Margaret Brinkley | 321 | 5.47 | |
| Labour | Catherine Wareham | 307 | 5.24 | |
| UKIP | Kara Platt | 307 | 5.24 | |
| Labour | Raymond Cook | 304 | 5.19 | |
| UKIP | Evelyn Faulkner | 304 | 5.19 | |
| UKIP | Sidney Pratt | 255 | 4.35 | |
| Liberal Democrats | Peter Huse | 245 | 4.18 | |
| Turnout | | | 29.18 | |

Cheshunt North
| Party | Candidate | Votes | % | ±% |
|---|---|---|---|---|
| Conservative | Ray Hannam | 1,164 | 27.23 | |
| Conservative | Nick Hart | 1,145 | 26.78 | |
| Conservative | Mike Iszatt | 998 | 23.35 | |
| Labour | John Brotherton | 484 | 11.32 | |
| Labour | Peter Alford | 483 | 11.29 | |
| Turnout | | | 24.34 | |

Cheshunt South & Theobalds
| Party | Candidate | Votes | % | ±% |
|---|---|---|---|---|
| Conservative | Carol Crump-Eynon | 1,073 | 23.71 | |
| Conservative | Tony Siracusa | 1,007 | 22.26 | |
| Conservative | Cody McCormick | 988 | 21.84 | |
| Labour | Richard Greenhill | 503 | 11.12 | |
| Labour | Ronald McCole | 477 | 10.54 | |
| Labour | Rosemary Trundell | 476 | 10.52 | |
| Turnout | | | 25.30 | |

Flamstead End
| Party | Candidate | Votes | % | ±% |
|---|---|---|---|---|
| Conservative | Dee Hart | 1,070 | 26.66 | |
| Conservative | Paul Seeby | 1,010 | 25.17 | |
| Conservative | Sue Ball-Greenwood | 996 | 24.82 | |
| Labour | Shirley McInnes | 317 | 7.90 | |
| Labour | Bernice Paulin | 317 | 7.90 | |
| Labour | Merve Balci | 303 | 7.55 | |
| Turnout | | | 24.43 | |

Goffs Oak
| Party | Candidate | Votes | % | ±% |
|---|---|---|---|---|
| Conservative | Jeremy Pearce | 1,462 | 29.64 | |
| Conservative | Peter Moule | 1,348 | 27.33 | |
| Conservative | Mark Mills-Bishop | 1,306 | 26.47 | |
| Labour | Cherry Robbins | 307 | 6.22 | |
| Labour | Gillian Lawrence | 263 | 5.33 | |
| Labour | Samantha Simpson | 247 | 5.01 | |
| Turnout | | | 25.42 | |

Hoddesdon North
| Party | Candidate | Votes | % | ±% |
|---|---|---|---|---|
| Conservative | Keith Brown | 1,047 | 20.50 | |
| Conservative | Justin Evans | 1,006 | 19.69 | |
| Conservative | Lyn White | 1,002 | 19.62 | |
| Labour | Alex Harvey | 393 | 7.69 | |
| Labour | Arthur Hillyard | 371 | 7.26 | |
| Labour | Roy Wareham | 356 | 6.97 | |
| UKIP | Dawn Bloor | 353 | 6.91 | |
| UKIP | Anthony Faulkner | 305 | 5.97 | |
| UKIP | Jack Salmon | 275 | 5.39 | |
| Turnout | | | 26.12 | |

Hoddesdon Town & Rye Park
| Party | Candidate | Votes | % | ±% |
|---|---|---|---|---|
| Conservative | Ken Ayling | 718 | 18.79 | |
| Conservative | Bren Perryman | 648 | 16.96 | |
| Conservative | Tony Infantino | 646 | 16.91 | |
| Labour | Annette Marples | 433 | 11.34 | |
| Labour | Edward Hopgood | 348 | 9.11 | |
| Labour | James Harvey | 334 | 8.74 | |
| UKIP | David Platt | 324 | 8.48 | |
| UKIP | Salvatore Scozzaro | 222 | 5.81 | |
| Liberal Democrats | Kirstie De Rivaz | 147 | 3.85 | |
| Turnout | | | 22.86 | |

Rosedale & Bury Green
| Party | Candidate | Votes | % | ±% |
|---|---|---|---|---|
| Conservative | Hazel Jackson | 1,108 | 24.06 | |
| Conservative | Martin Greensmyth | 1,107 | 24.04 | |
| Conservative | Yvonne Bettiss | 1,089 | 23.65 | |
| Labour | Carol Bowman | 464 | 10.08 | |
| Labour | Alexander McInnes | 447 | 9.71 | |
| Labour | George Panayiotopoulos | 390 | 8.47 | |
| Turnout | | | 23.74 | |

Waltham Cross
| Party | Candidate | Votes | % | ±% |
|---|---|---|---|---|
| Labour | Malcolm Aitken | 942 | 19.26 | |
| Labour | Neil Harvey | 853 | 17.44 | |
| Labour | Michael Watson | 834 | 17.06 | |
| Conservative | Sheila Benford | 771 | 15.77 | |
| Conservative | Dave Braithwaite | 750 | 15.34 | |
| Conservative | Pat Leslie | 740 | 15.13 | |
| Turnout | | | 25.66 | |

Wormley & Turnford
| Party | Candidate | Votes | % | ±% |
|---|---|---|---|---|
| Conservative | Jim Metcalf | 1,024 | 25.27 | |
| Conservative | Bob Bick | 1,023 | 25.25 | |
| Conservative | Gordon Nicholson | 909 | 22.43 | |
| Labour | Roger Trundell | 445 | 10.98 | |
| Labour | Janet Wareham | 422 | 10.42 | |
| Liberal Democrats | Nigel De Rivaz | 229 | 5.65 | |
| Turnout | | | 20.57 | |
