= 2012 Three Rivers District Council election =

2012 UK local government election

Results of the 2012 Three Rivers District Council election

Elections to Three Rivers District Council were held on 3 May 2012 to elect one-third of the council of Three Rivers district in England.

The Liberal Democrats won the largest number of seats and the most votes. The Conservatives failed to strengthen their position against the Liberal Democrats, who remained in overall control of Three Rivers. Labour gained two seats, including one they had lost to the British National Party; the incumbent moved to the English Democrats Party in 2010 and stood as the EDP candidate. Overall, however, this council remains under firm LibDem control, with most seats contested between them and the Conservatives, and Labour having little prospect of improving their own representation.

After the election, the composition of the council was

- Liberal Democrat 28 (-1)
- Conservative 14 (no change)
- Labour 6 (+2)
- English Democrats Party 0 (-1) (originally held for the BNP in 2008)

== Election result ==
Three Rivers local election result 2012
Party	Seats	Gains	Losses	Net gain/loss	Seats %	Votes %	Votes	+/−
Liberal Democrats	8	0	-1	-1		40.0	7039	
Conservative	5	1	1	0		39.9	7022	
Labour	3	+2	0	+2		18.3	3213	
English Democrat	0	0	0	0	0	1.3	234	
UKIP	0	0	0	0	0	0.4	69	
BNP	0	0	-1	-1	0	0	0	

== Ward results ==
Defending incumbent marked with "*"

Abbots Langley
Party	Candidate	Votes	%	±%
Liberal Democrats	David MAJOR*	736	61.2	
Conservative	Mehdi MOOSSAVI	255	21.2	
Labour	Joanne Victoria COX	211	17.6	
Majority		481	40.0	
Turnout		1202	32.4	
Liberal Democrats hold		Swing		

Ashridge
Party	Candidate	Votes	%	±%
Labour	Marie-Louise Straub NOLAN	335	48.8	
English Democrat	Seamus DUNNE	154	22.4	
Conservative	Nigel STEWART	138	20.1	
Liberal Democrats	Nena SPELLEN	60	8.7	
Majority		181	26.4	
Turnout		687	25.5	
Labour gain from BNP		Swing		

Carpenders Park
Party	Candidate	Votes	%	±%
Conservative	Terry DOS RAMOS	675	43.5	
Liberal Democrats	Geoff DUNNE	674	43.4	
Labour	Judith Ann WALKER	203	13.1	
Majority		1	0.1	
Turnout		1552	38.1	
Conservative gain from Liberal Democrats		Swing		

Chorleywood East
Party	Candidate	Votes	%	±%
Conservative	Chris HAYWARD*	815	78.0	
Liberal Democrats	Raj KHIROYA	158	15.1	
Labour	David WILLIAMS	72	6.9	
Majority		657	62.9	
Turnout		1045	30.6	
Conservative hold		Swing		

Chorleywood West
Party	Candidate	Votes	%	±%
Liberal Democrats	Sue STIBBS	1028	50.8	
Conservative	Emma Claire BINDLOSS	862	42.6	
Labour	Fiona Katherine GOBLE	134	6.6	
Majority		166	8.2	
Turnout		2024	45.9	
Liberal Democrats hold		Swing		

Croxley Green
Party	Candidate	Votes	%	±%
Liberal Democrats	Brian Richard NORMAN*	795	59.2	
Conservative	Christine Heather JEFFORD	392	29.2	
Labour	Maureen SEDLACEK	155	11.5	
Majority		403	30.0	
Turnout		1342	30.8	
Liberal Democrats hold		Swing		

Hayling
Party	Candidate	Votes	%	±%
Labour	Stephen Michael James KING	421	72.3	
Conservative	WORRALL Jackie	128	22.0	
Liberal Democrats	Tony HUMPHREYS	33	5.7	
Majority		293	50.3	
Turnout		582	22.6	
Labour hold		Swing		

Langleybury
Party	Candidate	Votes	%	±%
Liberal Democrats	Chris WHATELY-SMITH*	700	61.1	
Conservative	Michelle BAUDIN	237	20.7	
Labour	Philip Edward LOCKETT	208	18.2	
Majority		463	40.4	
Turnout		1145	29.7	
Liberal Democrats hold		Swing		

Leavesden
Party	Candidate	Votes	%	±%
Liberal Democrats	Keith WILLIAMS	686	66.3	
Conservative	Hitesh Kumar TAILOR	192	18.6	
Labour	Colin James GRAY	157	15.2	
Majority		494	47.7	
Turnout		1035	25.1	
Liberal Democrats hold		Swing		

Maple Cross and Mill End
Party	Candidate	Votes	%	±%
Liberal Democrats	Peter WAKELING*	613	54.9	
Conservative	David William RAW	321	28.7	
Labour	Sarah LINHART	183	16.4	
Majority		292	26.2	
Turnout		1117	27.0	
Liberal Democrats hold		Swing		

Moor Park and Eastbury
Party	Candidate	Votes	%	±%
Conservative	Amrit MEDIRATTA*	955	75.6	
Labour	Joan KING	181	14.3	
Liberal Democrats	Jerry ASQUITH	127	10.1	
Majority		774	61.3	
Turnout		1263	27.7	
Conservative hold		Swing		

Northwick
Party	Candidate	Votes	%	±%
Labour	Ana BAKSHI	430	58.1	
Conservative	Malcolm BUTWICK	161	21.8	
English Democrat	Roger Warwick HOLMES	80	10.8	
Liberal Democrats	Ron SPELLEN	69	9.3	
Majority		269	36.3	
Turnout		740	21.1	
Labour gain from Conservative		Swing		

Oxhey Hall
Party	Candidate	Votes	%	±%
Liberal Democrats	Alison SCARTH*	545	52.3	
Conservative	Diane DAY	342	32.8	
Labour	Brendan O’BRIEN	87	8.3	
UKIP	Michael Ernest MATTHEWSON	69	6.6	
Majority		203	19.5	
Turnout		1043	39.9	
Liberal Democrats hold		Swing		

Penn
Party	Candidate	Votes	%	±%
Liberal Democrats	Sarah Jane NELMES*	294	44.5	
Conservative	James Richard DWYER	202	30.6	
Labour	David WARBURTON	165	25.0	
Majority		92	13.9	
Turnout		661	26.0	
Liberal Democrats hold		Swing		

Rickmansworth
Party	Candidate	Votes	%	±%
Conservative	Paula Elizabeth HISCOCKS*	694	64.9	
Liberal Democrats	Jill Marguerite SWAINSON	205	19.2	
Labour	Karen Ruth MCINTOSH	171	16.0	
Majority		489	45.7	
Turnout		1070	31.0	
Liberal Democrats hold		Swing		

Rickmansworth West
Party	Candidate	Votes	%	±%
Conservative	Russell Owen SMITH*	653	61.1	
Liberal Democrats	Pat HOWELL	316	29.6	
Labour	Bruce PROCHNIK	100	9.4	
Majority		337	31.5	
Turnout		1069	38.0	
Liberal Democrats hold		Swing		
