= 2012 Hyndburn Borough Council election =

2012 UK local government election

- 3 May 2012

12 of 35 seats to Hyndburn Borough Council 18 seats needed for a majority
	First party	Second party	Third party
Leader	Miles Parkinson	Peter Britcliffe	David Mason
Party	Labour	Conservative	Independents in Hyndburn
Leader's seat	Altham	St Andrew's
Seats before	18	14	3
Seats won	23	9	3
Seat change	▲5	▼5	Steady
- 2012 local election results in Hyndburn Labour Conservative Not contested

Elections to Hyndburn Borough Councill were held on Thursday, 3 May 2012. One third of the council was up for election.

== Background ==
Before the election Labour had a single-seat majority of 18 councillors, Conservatives had 14 councillors, while Independent (politician) had 3 councillors.

Labour candidates contested every ward. Conservative candidates contested all wards except Peel-Ward. Various independent candidates contested five-wards. LibDem's just three-candidates contested in Barnfield Ward, Church Ward and Spring Hill Ward. UkKIP's only-two candidates contested in Overton Ward and St. Oswalds Ward.

== Local election result ==
After the election, the composition of the council was -

- Labour 23
- Conservative 9
- Independent 3

Hyndburn local election result 2012 - over just 12 wards
Party	Seats	Gains	Losses	Net gain/loss	Seats %	Votes %	Votes	+/−
Labour	9	5	0	5	65.7	55.91	9351	2240
Conservative	3	0	5	-5	25.7	35.19	5885	-2593
Independents in Hyndburn	0	0	0	0	8.6	3.82	639	242
UKIP	0	0	0	0	0	3.77	630	N/A
Liberal Democrats	0	0	0	0	0	1.32	220	-597

NB: Four (of the 16) Council ward seats that were NOT up for re-election in 2012 included the following wards - Clayton Le Moors, Huncoat, Immanuel in Oswaldtwistle and Milnshaw in Accrington.

== Ward results ==
=== Altham ===
Altham
Party	Candidate	Votes	%	±%
Labour	Chris Fisher	733	62.12	14.52
Conservative	Marion Raynor	251	21.27	−31.13
Independents in Hyndburn	John Hodgkiss	196	16.61	N/A
Majority		482	40.85	N/A
Turnout		1,180	TBC	
Labour gain from Conservative		Swing		

=== Barnfield ===
Barnfield
Party	Candidate	Votes	%	±%
Conservative	Tony Dobson	770	54.88	−10.02
Labour	Joyce Plummer	609	43.41	22.71
Liberal Democrats	Richard Kelly	24	1.71	N/A
Majority		161	11.48	N/A
Turnout		1,403	TBC	
Conservative hold		Swing		

=== Baxenden ===
Baxenden
Party	Candidate	Votes	%	±%
Conservative	Terry Hurn	726	64.42	−6.58
Labour	David Hartley	401	35.58	16.98
Majority		325	28.84	N/A
Turnout		1,127	TBC	
Conservative hold		Swing		

=== Central ===
Central
Party	Candidate	Votes	%	±%
Labour	Abdul Khan	1163	57.83	26.63
Conservative	Allah Dad	848	42.17	0.27
Majority		213	15.66	N/A
Turnout		2,011	TBC	
Labour gain from Conservative		Swing		

=== Church ===
Church
Party	Candidate	Votes	%	±%
Labour	Joan Smith	710	58.58	1.28
Conservative	Basharat Khan	325	26.82	−15.88
Independent	Malcolm Pritchard	141	11.63	N/A
Liberal Democrats	Stephen Talbot	36	2.97	N/A
Majority		385	31.77	N/A
Turnout		1,212	TBC	
Labour hold		Swing		

=== Netherton ===
Netherton
Party	Candidate	Votes	%	±%
Labour	Noordad Aziz	834	65.26	32.56
Conservative	Lynn Wilson	444	34.74	−2.26
Majority		390	30.52	N/A
Turnout		1,278	TBC	
Labour gain from Conservative		Swing		

=== Overton ===
Overton
Party	Candidate	Votes	%	±%
Labour	Kerry Molineux	868	45.80	1.3
Conservative	Peter Clarke	387	20.42	−35.08
Independent	John Duckworth	317	16.73	N/A
UKIP	Graham Davidson	224	11.82	N/A
Great Harwood Independents	Jamie Glover	99	5.22	N/A
Majority		481	25.38	N/A
Turnout		1,895	TBC	
Labour gain from Conservative		Swing		

=== Peel ===
Peel
Party	Candidate	Votes	%	±%
Labour	Wendy Dwyer	570	67.70	−4.0
Independents in Hyndburn	Paul Brown	272	32.30	N/A
Majority		298	35.39	N/A
Turnout		842	TBC	
Labour hold		Swing		

=== Rishton ===
Rishton
Party	Candidate	Votes	%	±%
Labour	Harry Grayson	1374	71.30	8.5
Conservative	Warren Melia	553	28.70	−8.5
Majority		821	42.61	N/A
Turnout		1,927	TBC	
Labour hold		Swing		

=== Spring Hill ===
Spring Hill
Party	Candidate	Votes	%	±%
Labour	Munsif Dad	940	60.22	2.32
Conservative	Mohammed Younis	400	25.62	−16.48
Independents in Hyndburn	Kenneth Smith	171	10.95	N/A
Liberal Democrats	Kim Furness	50	3.20	N/A
Majority		540	34.59	N/A
Turnout		1,561	TBC	
Labour hold		Swing		

=== St. Andrew's ===
St. Andrew's
Party	Candidate	Votes	%	±%
Labour	Bill Pinder	543	52.62	25.12
Conservative	Brian Walmsley	489	47.38	−12.02
Majority		53	5.14	N/A
Turnout		1,032	TBC	
Labour gain from Conservative		Swing		

=== St. Oswald's ===
St. Oswald's
Party	Candidate	Votes	%	±%
Conservative	Marlene Haworth	692	40.61	−25.59
Labour	Stewart Eaves	606	35.56	1.76
UKIP	Paul Thompson	406	23.83	N/A
Majority		86	5.05	N/A
Turnout		1,704	TBC	
Conservative hold		Swing		
