= 2012 Amber Valley Borough Council election =

UK local government election

2012 local election results in Amber Valley

Elections to Amber Valley Borough Council in Derbyshire, England took place on Thursday 3 May 2012. One third of the council was up for election and the Conservative Party held overall control of the council. Overall turnout in this election was 33.28 per cent.

After the election, the composition of the council was:

- Conservative 24
- Labour 21

== Election result ==
Amber Valley election result 2012
Party	Seats	Gains	Losses	Net gain/loss	Seats %	Votes %	Votes	+/−
Labour	10	6	0	+6	62.5	50.4	12,068	
Conservative	6	0	4	-4	37.5	36.4	8,704	
Liberal Democrats	0	0	0	0	0	4.8	1,153	
BNP	0	0	2	-2	0	4.1	990	
UKIP	0	0	0	0	0	1.6	386	
Green	0	0	0	0	0	1.4	328	
Independent	0	0	0	0	0	0.9	210	
National Front	0	0	0	0	0	0.4	99	

=== Ward results ===
Alfreton
Party	Candidate	Votes	%	±%
Labour	Marlene Bennett	1202	69.2	20.8
Conservative	Kat Moss	447	25.73	−14.41
Liberal Democrats	Peter Jelf	75	4.32	−10.39
Rejected ballots				
Majority		755	43.47	
Turnout		1737 of 6307	27.54%	
Labour hold		Swing		

Belper Central
Party	Candidate	Votes	%	±%
Conservative	John Nelson	627	42.19	−18.73
Labour	Ben Bellamy	450	30.28	10.57
Green	Dave Wells	328	22.07	2.16
Liberal Democrats	Jane Benson	71	4.78	0.05
Rejected ballots				
Majority		177	11.91	
Turnout		1486 of 4357	34.11%	
Conservative hold		Swing		

Belper North
Party	Candidate	Votes	%	±%
Conservative	Alan Cox	647	44.1	−6.96
Labour	Erik Johnsen	584	39.81	21.71
Liberal Democrats	Jeremy Benson	226	15.41	−2.26
Rejected ballots				
Majority		63	4.29	
Turnout		1467 of 4068	36.06%	
Conservative hold		Swing		

Codnor and Waingroves
Party	Candidate	Votes	%	±%
Labour	Christopher Emmas-Williams	825	57.94	17.73
Conservative	Robert Phillips-Forsyth	339	23.81	−17.66
UKIP	Ann Fox	198	13.9	13.9
BNP	Emma Roper	59	4.14	−16.57
Rejected ballots				
Majority		486	34.13	
Turnout		1424 of 3945	36.1%	
Labour hold		Swing		

Heage and Ambergate
Party	Candidate	Votes	%	±%
Conservative	Angela Ward	668	42.44	−28.35
Labour	David Farrelly	634	40.28	8.35
Independent	Jack Evans	210	13.34	13.34
Liberal Democrats	Rodney Tomkins	57	3.62	3.62
Rejected ballots				
Majority		34	2.16	
Turnout		1574 of 4100	38.39%	
Conservative hold		Swing		

Heanor and Loscoe
Party	Candidate	Votes	%	±%
Labour	Alan Longdon	783	56.82	21.45
Conservative	Ella McManus	350	25.4	−3.92
BNP	Ken Cooper	245	17.78	−17.51
Rejected ballots				
Majority		433	31.42	
Turnout		1385 of 4137	33.48%	
Labour hold		Swing		

Heanor East
Party	Candidate	Votes	%	±%
Labour	Phil Hill	744	52.37	21.18
Conservative	Gary Wells	391	26.15	−6.72
BNP	Cliff Roper	384	19	−17.46
Liberal Democrats	Keith Falconbridge	69	4.62	0.05
Rejected ballots				
Majority		351	26.22	
Turnout		1495 of 4606	32.46%	
Labour gain from BNP		Swing		

Heanor West
Party	Candidate	Votes	%	±%
Labour	Bob Janes	838	56.2	25.5
Conservative	Richard Iliffe	381	25.55	3.56
BNP	Adrian Hickman	272	18.24	−21.16
Rejected ballots				
Majority		457	30.65	
Turnout		1500 of 4774	31.42%	
Labour gain from BNP		Swing		

Ironville and Riddings
Party	Candidate	Votes	%	±%
Labour	Roy Walker	705	47	5.59
Conservative	Jack Brown	688	45.87	−22.59
Liberal Democrats	Ollie Smith	97	6.47	6.47
Rejected ballots				
Majority		17	1.13	
Turnout		1500 of 4675	32.09%	
Labour gain from Conservative		Swing		

Kilburn, Denby and Holbrook
Party	Candidate	Votes	%	±%
Conservative	Charles Bull	1071		
Conservative	Kevin Buttery	1066		
Labour	John Banks	871		
Labour	Matthew Cruckshank	811		
Liberal Democrats	Margaret Tomkins	215		
Rejected ballots				
Majority		195		
Turnout		2192 of 6226	35.21%	
Conservative hold		Swing		
Conservative hold		Swing		

Langley Mill & Aldercar
Party	Candidate	Votes	%	±%
Labour	Brian Gration	688	60.51	18.23
Conservative	Terry Thorpe	354	31.13	−13.34
National Front	Timothy Knowles	99	8.7	−12.8
Rejected ballots				
Majority		334	29.38	
Turnout		1137 of 4104	27.70	
Labour gain from Conservative		Swing		

Ripley
Party	Candidate	Votes	%	±%
Labour	Tony Holmes	1409	57.79	27.1
Conservative	David Bowley	905	37.12	−22.81
Liberal Democrats	Paul Gibbons	106	4.35	−5.5
Rejected ballots				
Majority		504	20.67	
Turnout		2438 of 7060	34.73	
Labour gain from Conservative		Swing		

Ripley & Marehay
Party	Candidate	Votes	%	±%
Labour	Mick Wilson	891	51	22.28
Conservative	Ron Ashton	638	36.52	−22.81
BNP	Alan Edwards	130	7.44	−21.02
Liberal Democrats	Michael Bedford	76	4.35	4.35
Rejected ballots				
Majority		253	14.48	
Turnout		1747 of 4670	37.41	
Labour gain from Conservative		Swing		

Shipley Park, Horsley and Horsley Woodhouse
Party	Candidate	Votes	%	±%
Conservative	Alex Stevenson	971	57.87	7.13
Labour	Stephen Holden	587	34.98	0.11
Liberal Democrats	Kate Smith	104	6.2	6.2
Rejected ballots				
Majority		404	22.88	
Turnout		1678 of 4621	36.71%	
Conservative hold		Swing		

Somercotes
Party	Candidate	Votes	%	±%
Labour	John McCabe	857	64.19	17.36
Conservative	Ian Smith	226	16.93	−11.59
UKIP	Paul Bailey	188	14.08	14.08
Liberal Democrats	Joel Hunt	57	4.2	−12
Rejected ballots				
Majority		631	47.26	
Turnout		1335 of 4754	28.08%	
Labour hold		Swing		
