= English Democrats election results =

== Parliamentary elections ==
=== Summary of general election performances ===
The party has secured the following results in general elections to the House of Commons of the Parliament of the United Kingdom.

Year	No. of candidates	Total votes	Average votes per candidate	% of vote	Change (% points)	Saved deposits^{*}	No. of MPs
2005	24	15,149	631	0.1	0	0	0
2010	107	64,826	605	0.2	+0.1	1	0
2015	32	6,531	204	0.0	−0.2	0	0
2017	7	1,913	319	0.0	-	0	0
2019	5	1,987	397	0.0	-	0	0
2024	15	5,182	345	0.0	-	0	0

=== By-elections, 2004–05 ===
Date of election	Constituency	Candidate	Votes	%
15 July 2004	Birmingham Hodge Hill	Mark Wheatley	277	1.4
30 September 2004	Hartlepool	Ed Abrams	41	0.1

=== General election 2005 ===
The English Democrats contested 24 seats, receiving a total of 15149 votes, an average of 631 (range 221 to 1216). The percentage share of the vote ranged from 0.6% to 3.4%, with an average of 1.45%. No candidates were elected.

Constituency	Candidate	Votes	%
Aldershot	G Cowd	701	1.7
Basildon	Ms K Gandy	510	1.2
Bristol North West	M Blundell	828	1.7
Chatham & Aylesford	M Russell	668	1.6
City of Chester	E Abrams	308	0.7
Chesterfield	I Jerram	814	1.8
Copeland	A Mossop	662	2.0
Doncaster North	M Cassidy	561	1.8
Epping Forest	Robin Tilbrook	631	1.4
Grantham & Stamford	B Brown	774	1.6
Greenwich & Woolwich	Garry Bushell	1216	3.4
Hexham	I Riddell	521	1.3
Ipswich	J Kay	641	1.3
Lancashire West	S Garrett	525	1.2
Leeds North West	A Knowles	545	1.2
Norwich South	C Constable	466	1.1
Reigate	H Green	600	1.4
Saffron Walden	R Brown	860	1.6
Sevenoaks	J Marshall	751	1.7
Southend West	J Moss	701	1.8
Staffordshire South^{*}	Garry Bushell	643	2.5
Vauxhall	J Polenceus	221	0.6
Wakefield	P McEnhill	356	0.8
Wantage	G Lambourne	646	1.2

^{*}Note the South Staffordshire election was postponed until 23 June due to the death of a candidate

=== By-elections, 2005–10 ===
Date of election	Constituency	Candidate	Votes	%
29 June 2006	Bromley and Chislehurst	Steven Uncles	212	0.7

Date of election	Constituency	Candidate	Votes	%
10 July 2008	Haltemprice and Howden	Joanne Robinson	1714	7.2

=== General election 2010 ===
The English Democrats stood 107 candidates in the 2010 general election. (106 is the minimum number required to qualify for a Party Election Broadcast.) The EDP received 64,826 votes, or 0.3% of the vote in England, won only one deposit in Doncaster North with 5.2% and overall 0.2% of the vote in the United Kingdom. No candidates were elected.

Constituency	Candidate	Votes	%
Ashfield	Tony Ellis	1102	2.3
Beckenham	Dan Eastgate	223	0.5
Bedfordshire Mid	John Cooper	712	1.3
Bexleyheath & Crayford	John Griffiths	466	1.1
Blyth Valley	Allan White	327	0.8
Bosworth	James Lampitt	615	1.1
Brent North	Arvind Tailor	247	0.5
Brentford & Isleworth	David Cunningham	230	0.4
Brentwood & Ongar	Robin Tilbrook	491	1.0
Bristol East	Stephen Wright	347	0.8
Bristol North West	Ray Carr	635	1.3
Bristol South	Craig Clarke	400	0.8
Bristol West	Jon Baker	270	0.5
Bromley & Chislehurst	Jon Cheeseman	376	0.9
Broxbourne	Debbie LeMay	618	1.4
Bury South	Valerie Morris	494	1.0
Calder Valley	Barry Greenwood	157	0.3
Camberwell & Peckham	Yohara Robby Munilla	435	0.9
Cambridgeshire North East	Graham Murphy	387	0.7
Cambridgeshire North West	Stephen Goldspink	1407	2.4
Chatham & Aylesford	Sean Varnham	400	0.9
Chelmsford	Claire Breed	254	0.5
Chelsea & Fulham	George Roseman	169	0.4
Chester, City of	Ed Abrams	594	1.3
Chesterfield	Ian Jerram	1213	2.6
Chippenham	John Maguire	307	0.6
Cities of London & Westminster	Frank Roseman	191	0.5
Colchester	Eddie Bone	335	0.7
Dartford	Gary Rogers	2178	4.3
Daventry	Alan Bennett-Spencer	1187	2.3
Devon North	Nigel Vidler	146	0.3
Dewsbury	Michael Felse	661	1.2
Don Valley	Bernie Aston	1756	4.0
Doncaster Central	Lawrence Parramore	1816	4.4
Doncaster North	Wayne Crawshaw	2148	5.2
Dover	Michael Walters	216	0.4
Ealing Southall	Sati Chaggar	408	1.0
East Ham	Barry O'Connor	822	1.6
East Worthing & Shoreham	Clive Maltby	389	0.8
Eastleigh	Tony Stephen	249	0.5
Eltham	Mike Tibby	217	0.5
Enfield North	Raquel Weald	131	0.3
Enfield Southgate	Ben Weald	173	0.4
Epping Forest	Kim Sawyer	285	0.6
Erith & Thamesmead	Laurence Williams^{*}	465	1.1
Esher & Walton	Mike Kearsley	307	0.6
Fareham	Joe Jenkins	618	1.1
Gillingham & Rainham	Dean Lacey	464	1.0
Gloucester	Alan Platt	564	1.1
Gosport	Bob Shaw	622	1.3
Gravesham	Steven Uncles	1005	2.1
Greenwich & Woolwich	Topo Wresniwiro	339	0.8
Haltemprice & Howden	Joanne Robinson	1485	3.0
Hampshire East	Matt Williams	710	1.4
Harborough	David Ball	568	3.1
Hastings & Rye	Rodney Bridger	339	0.7
Havant	Fungus Addams	809	1.8
Hayes & Harlington	Cliff Dixon	464	1.1
Holborn & St Pancras	Mikel Susperregi	75	0.1
Hyndburn	Christopher Reid	413	1.0
Isle of Wight	Ian Dunsire	1233	1.8
Islington South & Finsbury	John Dodds	301	0.7
Kettering	Derek Hilling	952	2.0
Kingston upon Hull East	Mike Burton	715	2.1
Kingston upon Hull North	Michael Cassidy	200	0.6
Kingston upon Hull West and Hessle	Peter Mawer	876	2.8
Kingswood	Michael Blundell	333	0.7
Leeds North West	Alan Procter	153	0.4
Lewisham East	James Rose	426	1.0
Lincoln	Ernest Coleman	604	1.3
Louth & Horncastle	Colin Mair	517	1.0
Meon Valley	Pat Harris	582	1.1
Northampton South	Kevin Sills	618	1.6
Old Bexley & Sidcup	Elaine Cheeseman	520	1.1
Orpington	Chriss Snape	199	0.1
Penistone & Stocksbridge	Paul McEnhill	492	1.1
Peterborough	Rob King	770	1.7
Poplar & Limehouse	Andrew Osborne	470	1.0
Portsmouth North	David Knight	1040	2.4
Portsmouth South	Ian DuCane	400	1.0
Rayleigh & Wickford	John Hayter	2219	4.2
Redditch	Vincent Schittone	255	0.6
Rochester & Strood	Ron Sands	2182	4.5
Romford	Peter Thorogood	603	1.3
Rossendale & Darwen	Michael Johnson	663	1.4
Salford & Eccles	Stephen Morris	621	1.5
Selby & Ainsty	Graham Michael	677	1.3
Sevenoaks	Louise Uncles	806	1.6
Sheffield Hallam	David Wildgoose	586	1.1
South Northamptonshire	Tony Tappy	735	1.2
Southend West	Terry Phillips	546	1.3
Stevenage	Charles Vickers	366	0.8
Stockton North	Ian Saul	1724	2.9
Stratford-On-Avon	Fred Bishop	473	0.9
Streatham	Janus Polenceus	229	0.5
Sutton & Cheam	John Dodds	106	0.2
Tonbridge & Malling	Lisa Rogers	390	0.8
Uxbridge & South Ruislip	Roger Cooper	403	0.6
Vauxhall	Jose Navarro	289	0.7
Warwickshire North	David Lane	411	0.9
Wellingborough	Terry Spencer	530	1.0
West Bromwich East	Mark Cowles	1150	3.0
Westminster North	Edward Roseman	99	0.3
Weston-Super-Mare	John Peverelle	275	0.5
Winchester	Mark Lancaster	503	0.9
Workington	Rob Logan	414	1.1
Worsley & Eccles South	Paul Whitelegg	1334	3.2

^{*} Williams has also contested the London region for the Christian Peoples Alliance in the 2014 European elections, Old Bexley & Sidcup for the Christian Party in the 2015 general election, in Sidcup for the Liberal Party in the 2018 local election and Vale of Glamorgan for Gwlad Gwlad in the 2019 general election.

Source for results:

=== By-elections, 2010–15 ===
Date of election	Constituency	Candidate	Votes	%
13 January 2011	Oldham East and Saddleworth	Stephen Morris	144	0.4
3 March 2011	Barnsley Central	Kevin Riddiough	544	2.2
15 December 2011	Feltham and Heston	Roger Cooper	322	1.4
15 November 2012	Corby	David Wickham	432	1.21
29 November 2012	Rotherham	David Wildgoose	703	3.3
28 February 2013	Eastleigh	Michael Walters	70	0.2

=== General election 2015 ===
Constituency	Candidate	Votes	%
Barnsley, Central	Ian Sutton	477	1.3
Barnsley, E	Kevin Riddiough	440	1.1
Bath	Jenny Knight	63	0.1
Berwick-upon-Tweed	Neil Humphrey	88	0.2
Bexleyheath & Crayford	Maggi Young	151	0.3
Bradford, W	Therese Muchewicz	98	0.2
Brentwood & Ongar	Robin Tilbrook	173	0.3
Bury, S	Valerie Morris	170	0.4
Dagenham & Rainham	Kim Gandy	71	0.2
Dartford	Steve Uncles	211	0.4
Don Valley	Louise Dutton	242	0.6
Doncaster, Central	David Burnett	309	0.8
Doncaster, N	David Allen	448	1.1
Erith & Thamesmead	Graham Moore	188	0.4
Faversham & Mid Kent	Gary Butler	158	0.3
Harlow	Eddy Butler	115	0.3
Kettering	Derek Hilling	151	0.3
Monmouth	Stephen Morris	100	0.2
Nuneaton	Steve Paxton	104	0.2
Penistone & Stocksbridge	Colin Porter	500	1.1
Rother Valley	Sharon Pilling	377	0.8
Rotherham	Dean Walker	166	0.4
Sheffield, Brightside & Hillsborough	Justin Saxton	171	0.4
Sheffield, Central	Elizabeth Breed	68	0.2
Sheffield, Hallam	Steve Clegg	167	0.3
Sheffield, Heeley	David Haslett	122	0.3
Sheffield, SE	Matthew Roberts	141	0.3
Southend, W	Jeremy Moss	165	0.4
Stevenage	Charles Vickers	115	0.2
Suffolk Central & Ipswich, N	Tony Holyoak	162	0.3
Wentworth & Dearne	Alan England	309	0.7
Weston-super-Mare	Ronald Lavelle	311	0.6

=== By-elections, 2015–17 ===
Date of election	Constituency	Candidate	Votes	%
20 October 2016	Batley & Spen	Thérèse Hirst	969	4.8
20 October 2016	Witney	Winston McKenzie	52	0.1

=== General election 2017 ===
Constituency	Candidate	Votes	%
Barnsley, Central	Stephen Morris	211	0.5
Barnsley, E	Kevin Riddiough	287	0.7
Bradford, S	Thérèse Hirst	377	0.9
Cambridgeshire North East	Stephen Goldspink	293	0.5
Clacton	Robin Tilbrook	289	0.7
Doncaster, N	David Allen	363	0.9
Holburn & St Pancras	Janus Polenceus	93	0.2

=== General election 2019 ===
Constituency	Candidate	Votes	%
Bexleyheath & Crayford	Graham Moore	520	1.2
Brentwood & Ongar	Robin Tilbrook	532	1.0
Broxtowe	Amy Dalla Mura	432	0.8
Buckingham	Antonio Vitello	194	0.3
Doncaster, N	Frank Calladine	309	0.8

=== By-elections, 2019–2024 ===
Date of election	Constituency	Candidate	Votes	%
1 July 2021	Batley & Spen	Thérèse Hirst	207	0.6
2 December 2021	Old Bexley & Sidcup	Elaine Cheeseman	271	1.2
3 February 2022	Southend West	Catherine Blaiklock	320	2.2
23 June 2022	Wakefield	Thérèse Hirst	135	0.5
19 October 2023	Mid Bedfordshire	Antonio Vitiello	107	0.3

=== General election 2024 ===
Constituency	Candidate	Votes	%
Barnsley, N	Janus Polenceusz	42	0.1
Barnsley, S	Maxine Spencer	149	0.4
Bolton, W	Patrick McGrath	202	0.5
Boston and Skegness	David Dickason	518	1.3
Bradford, S	Thérèse Hirst	248	0.8
Brentwood & Ongar	Robin Tilbrook	189	0.4
Bury, S	Stephen Morris	224	0.5
Dover and Deal	Steve Laws	185	0.4
Dunstable and Leighton Buzzard	Antonio Vitiello	77	0.2
East Grinstead and Uckfield	William Highton	2,036	4.0
Great Yarmouth	Catherine Blaiklock	171	0.4
Leigh and Atherton	Craig Buckley	376	0.9
Makerfield	Thomas Bryer	368	0.9
Newark	Matthew Darrington	156	0.3
Shrewsbury	Chris Bovill	241	0.5

=== By-elections, 2024–present ===
Date of election	Constituency	Candidate	Votes	%
1 May 2025	Runcorn & Helsby	Catherine Blaiklock	95	0.3

== European Parliament elections ==
=== Summary of European election performance in the UK ===
Year	Number of English regions contested	Total votes	% of GB vote	Saved deposits	GB change (% points)	Number of MEPs
2004	5/9	130,056	0.8	0	N/A	0
2009	9/9	279,801	1.8	1	+1.0	0
2014	9/9	126,024	0.8	0	−1.1	0
2019	4/9	39,398	0.2	0	−0.6	0

Note: The English Democrats never stood in Scotland or Wales in the European elections although the results are displayed as a proportion of the GB results. (Northern Ireland has a different electoral system).

== London mayoral elections ==
Election	Candidate	1st round votes	%
2008	Matt O'Connor (Note: O'Connor withdrew a week before the poll, but was still on the ballot. He endorsed Alan Craig of the Christian Peoples Alliance.)	10,695	0.4%

Winston McKenzie filed paperwork to appear on the ballot in 2016, but the paperwork was declared invalid.

== London Assembly elections ==
Year	Candidates		Votes (%)	
Year	Constituency	Region	Constituency	Region
2008	14	23	37,171 (1.5%)	25,569 (1.0%)
2012	1	8	2,573 (0.1%)	22,025 (1.0%)

== English Police Commissioner elections ==
=== 2012 ===
Police force	Candidate	1st round votes	%	Posn/no. cands
Cambridgeshire Constabulary	Stephen Goldspink	7,219	8.1%	6 out of 7
Essex Police	Robin Tilbrook	11,550	6.87%	6 out of 6
Kent Police	Steven Uncles	10,789	5.3%	5 out of 6
Merseyside Police	Paul Rimmer	7,142	5.7%	6 out of 6
South Yorkshire Police	David Allen	22,608	15.6%	2 out of 5

=== 2016 ===
Police force	Candidate	1st round votes	%	Posn/no. cands
Bedfordshire Constabulary	Toni Bugle	6,569	6.1%	5 out of 5
Kent Police	Steve Uncles	8,311	3.1%	6 out of 6
South Yorkshire Police	David Allen	19,144	6.9%	5 out of 5
West Yorkshire Police	Therese Muchewicz	20,656	3.9%	5 out of 5

=== 2021 ===
Police force	Candidate	1st round votes	%	Posn/no. cands
Bedfordshire Police	Antonio Daniel Vitiello	3,387	2.8%	5 out of 5
Essex Police (Note: This was a Police, Fire and Crime Commissioner election)	Robin Tilbrook	42,831	9.8%	4 out of 4

== Welsh Assembly elections ==
=== 2007 National Assembly for Wales election ===
Source: BBC News
Due to the English Democrats stance on the status of Monmouthshire, the English Democrats stood in the three constituencies in Monmouthshire and in the South Wales East region. They came 16th place nationwide with 0.2% of the vote.

Constituency	Candidate	Votes	%
Monmouth	Ed Abrams	804	2.7
Newport East	Michael Blundell	429	2.2
Newport West	Andrew Constantine	634	2.7

Regional lists	Votes	%	+/- %
South Wales East	1,655	0.9	n/a

=== 2011 National Assembly for Wales election ===
Source: BBC News
The English Democrats stood five candidates in the South Wales East region and contested only one individual constituency, Monmouth. The vote in Monmouth fell by 0.2% but regional vote increased by 0.2%. They came 11th place nationwide with 0.1% of the vote.

Constituency	Candidate	Votes	%	+/- %
Monmouth	Steve Uncles	744	2.5	−0.2

Regional lists	Votes	%	+/- %
South Wales East	1,904	1.1	+0.2

=== 2016 National Assembly for Wales election ===
The party stood 1 candidate in the Monmouth constituency, and none in any electoral regions.

Constituency	Candidate	Votes	%	+/- %
Monmouth	Stephen Morris	146	0.5	−2.0

== Combined authority mayoral elections ==
=== 2017 ===
Authority	Position	Candidate	1st round votes	%	Posn/no. cands	Details
Cambridgeshire and Peterborough	Mayor of Cambridgeshire and Peterborough	Stephen Goldspink	2,256	1.1%	7 out of 7	Details
Greater Manchester	Mayor of Greater Manchester	Stephen Morris	11,115	2.0%	5 out of 8	Details

=== 2018 ===
Authority	Position	Candidate	1st round votes	%	Posn/no. cands	Details
Sheffield City Region	Mayor of the Sheffield City Region	David Allen	14,547	5.6%	6 out of 7	Details

=== 2021 ===
Authority	Position	Candidate	1st round votes	%	Posn/no. cands	Details
Greater Manchester	Mayor of Greater Manchester	Stephen Morris	9,488	1.4%	6 out of 9	Details
West Yorkshire	Mayor of West Yorkshire	Thérèse Hirst	8,969	1.5%	7 out of 7	Details

== Metropolitan borough mayoral elections ==
Authority	Year	Candidate	1st round votes	%	Second round total	%	Posn/no. cands	Details
Doncaster	2009	Peter Davies	16,961	22.5%	25,344	50.4%	1 out of 7	Details
Liverpool	2012	Paul Rimmer	1,400	1.4%	N/A		9 out of 12	Details
Salford	2012	Michael Felse	1,616	3.6%	N/A		8 out of 10	Details
Doncaster	2013	David Allen	4,615	7.5%	N/A		3 out of 10	Details
Liverpool	2016	Paul Rimmer	2,590	2.7%	N/A		7 out of 7	Details

== London borough mayoral elections ==
Authority	Year	Candidate	1st round votes	%	Posn/no. cands	Details
Lewisham	2010	Graham Dare	1,559	1.4%	7 out of 7	Details

== London local elections ==
=== 2006 ===
Authority	Ward	Candidate	Votes	%	Posn/no. cands	Details
Bexley	East Wickham	John-Anthony Fitzpatrick	392	3.9%	11 out of 14	Details
Lambeth	Oval	Janus Polenceus	108	1.4%	13 out of 13	Details
Total		2	500	0.0%		

=== 2010 ===
Authority	Ward	Candidate	Votes	%	Posn/no. cands	Details
Bexley	Barnehurst	Sandra Rogers	450	3.0%	11 out of 11	Details
Bexley	Belvedere	Sean Varnham	562	4.2%	8 out of 8	Details
Bexley	Blackfen & Lamorbey	Dan Eastgate	615	4.2%	10 out of 10	Details
Bexley	Blendon & Penhill	Elaine Cheeseman	645	4.1%	9 out of 9	Details
Bexley	Coylers	Mike Tibby	403	3.0%	11 out of 11	Details
Bexley	Crayford	Maggi Young	562	4.2%	9 out of 9	Details
Bexley	Cray Meadows	Laurence Williams	473	3.4%	11 out of 11	Details
Bexley	Lesnes Abbey	Peter Townsend	644	4.3%	8 out of 8	Details
Bexley	Northumberland Heath	Steve Uncles	449	3.1%	9 out of 9	Details
Bexley	St Michael's	Barbara Eastgate	562	3.6%	11 out of 11	Details
Bexley	Sidcup	Jon Cheeseman	490	3.0%	10 out of 11	Details
Greenwich	Blackheath Westcombe	Topo Wresniwiro	188	1.0%	11 out of 11	Details
Lambeth	Oval	Michael Perry	77	0.4%	13 out of 15	Details
Lambeth	Oval	Jose Navarro	64	0.4%	14 out of 15	Details
Lambeth	Oval	Issam Ebarek-Rmiki	56	0.3%	15 out of 15	Details
Lambeth	Prince's	John Dodds	135	0.8%	13 out of 14	Details
Lambeth	Prince's	Alfredo Cordal	106	0.6%	14 out of 14	Details
Lambeth	Stockwell	Janus Polenceus	60	0.4%	13 out of 13	Details
Southwark	Faraday	Yohara Robby	157	1.3%	12 out of 12	Details
Westminster	West End	Frank Roseman	107	1.2%	11 out of 11	Details
Total		20	6,805	0.2%		

=== 2014 ===
Authority	Ward	Candidate	Votes	%	Posn/no. cands	Details
Sutton	Wallington South	David Jeffreys	110	3.2%	14 out of 14	Details

=== 2018 ===
Authority	Ward	Candidate	Votes	%	Posn/no. cands	Details
Haringey	Northumberland Park	Janus Polenceusz	46	1.7%	13 out of 14	Details
Haringey	Northumberland Park	Max Spencer	41	1.5%	14 out of 14	Details

== Metropolitan borough local elections ==
=== 2004 ===
Authority	Ward	Candidate	Votes	%	Posn/no. cands	Details
Newcastle upon Tyne	Fawdon	Martin Thompson	240	2.5%	7 out of 10	Details

Source: Local Elections Archive Project

=== 2006 ===
Authority	Ward	Candidate	Votes	%	Posn/no. cands	Details
Doncaster	Finningley	Peter Davies	973	21.2%	2 out of 6	Details
Kirklees	Denby Dale	Paul McEnhill	436	8.3%	4 out of 6	Details
Leeds	Adel & Wharfedale	Stephen Elliott	563	7.3%	4 out of 4	Details
Newcastle upon Tyne	Fawdon	Martin Thompson	354	11.5%	3 out of 4	Details

Source: Local Elections Archive Project

=== 2007 ===
Authority	Ward	Candidate	Votes	%	Posn/no. cands	Details
Calderdale	Brighouse	Richard Langford	282	8.5%	5 out of 5	Details
Calderdale	Elland	Michael Clarke	408	15.1%	3 out of 4	Details
Calderdale	Park	Shakir Saghir	567	13.4%	4 out of 4	Details
Calderdale	Rastrick	David Stevenson	418	13.5%	3 out of 5	Details
Calderdale	Town	David Mounsey	165	5.9%	5 out of 5	Details
Doncaster	Finningley	Peter Davies	1,111	23.8%	2 out of 5	Details
Kirklees	Dalton	Stephen Bond	120	2.8%	6 out of 6	Details
Kirklees	Denby Dale	Paul McEnhill	310	6.0%	6 out of 6	Details
Kirklees	Kirkburton	Ivan Purkiss	96	1.9%	6 out of 6	Details
Leeds	Adel & Wharfedale	Stephen Elliott	197	2.6%	5 out of 5	Details
Leeds	Bramley & Stanningley	Dean Locke	326	6.3%	5 out of 6	Details
Salford	Swinton South	Chris Roscoe	210	7.8%	5 out of 5	Details
Trafford	Sale Moor	Craig Healey	252	8.7%	4 out of 5	Details

Source: Local Elections Archive Project

=== 2008 ===
Authority	Ward	Candidate	Votes	%	Posn/no. cands	Details
Bradford	Wibsey	Andrew Clarke	183	5.0%	5 out of 7	Details
Bury	Besses	Stephen Morris	354	13.4%	4 out of 4	Details
Calderdale	Elland	Michael Clarke	262	9.6%	4 out of 5	Details
Calderdale	Greetland & Stainland	Johnathan Rogan	59	1.9%	6 out of 6	Details
Calderdale	Northowram & Shelf	John Dowson	343	9.6%	4 out of 6	Details
Calderdale	Rastrick	David Stevenson	516	16.4%	3 out of 4	Details
Calderdale	Sowerby Bridge	Tom Mathieson	103	3.5%	5 out of 5	Details
Doncaster	Finningley	Peter Davies	1,033	21.6%	2 out of 6	Details
Doncaster	Torne Valley	John Wallis	449	10.9%	4 out of 6	Details
Kirklees	Denby Dale	Paul McEnhill	172	3.2%	6 out of 6	Details
Kirklees	Kirkburton	Ivan Purkiss	193	3.8%	4 out of 5	Details
Leeds	Bramley & Stanningley	Dean Locke	276	5.8%	5 out of 5	Details

Source: Local Elections Archive Project

=== 2010 ===
Authority	Ward	Candidate	Votes	%	Posn/no. cands	Details
Birmingham	Longbridge	Vincent Schittone	174	1.7%	6 out of 6	Details
Birmingham	Shard End	Frank Parker	98	1.1%	7 out of 9	Details
Bury	Besses	Stephen Morris	186	3.8%	5 out of 5	Details
Doncaster	Adwick	Janine Clark	1,004	17.7%	3 out of 4	Details
Doncaster	Armthorpe	Lawrence Parramore	692	11.4%	5 out of 5	Details
Doncaster	Askern Spa	Malcolm Woodrow	1415	24.9%	3 out of 3	Details
Doncaster	Bentley	Bernard Warner	1,114	23.1%	2 out of 4	Details
Doncaster	Bessacarr & Cantley	Mick Cooper	1,149	16.0%	4 out of 4	Details
Doncaster	Central	Berny Boldry	783	14.5%	3 out of 5	Details
Doncaster	Conisbrough & Denaby	Julie Bulcroft	722	11.1%	3 out of 5	Details
Doncaster	Edenthorpe, Kirk Sandall & Barnby Dun	Fred Gee	1,100	16.2%	5 out of 5 (joint)	Details
Doncaster	Edlington & Warmsworth	Wayne Crawshaw	1,024	17.1%	2 out of 6	Details
Doncaster	Finningley	Eric Tetley	1,612	19.9%	3 out of 4	Details
Doncaster	Great North Road	Steve Grocott	1,229	18.2%	3 out of 5	Details
Doncaster	Hatfield	Mick Glynn	801	13.8%	3 out of 7	Details
Doncaster	Mexborough	Ieva Parramore	413	7.1%	5 out of 5	Details
Doncaster	Rossington	Carol Young	733	13.5%	4 out of 6	Details
Doncaster	Sprotbrough	Barbara Hewitt	1,342	21.0%	3 out of 4	Details
Doncaster	Stainforth & Moorends	Margaret Holt-Taylor	580	11.7%	4 out of 7	Details
Doncaster	Torne Valley	Bernie Aston	523	7.7%	4 out of 5	Details
Doncaster	Town Moor	Guy Aston	637	11.4%	4 out of 6	Details
Doncaster	Wheatley	Guy Aston	1,539	30.9%	2 out of 3	Details
North Tyneside	Longbenton	Martin Thompson	206	4.4%	5 out of 5	Details
Salford	Walkden North	Laurence Depares	424	9.7%	4 out of 4	Details
Salford	Walkden South	Paul Whitelegg	203	3.8%	5 out of 5	Details
Sheffield	Dore & Totley	Peter Smith	417	4.0%	4 out of 5	Details
Sheffield	Woodhouse	Derek Hutchinson	331	4.3%	5 out of 6	Details
Trafford	Altrincham	Steve Mills	168	3.1%	5 out of 5	Details

Source: Local Elections Archive Project

=== 2011 ===
Authority	Ward	Candidate	Votes	%	Posn/no. cands	Details
Barnsley	Hoyland Milton	Kevin Riddiough	290	8.8%	4 out of 4	Details
Bradford	Wibsey	Andrew Clarke	226	6.5%	5 out of 5	Details
Bury	Besses	Stephen Morris	209	7.5%	4 out of 5	Details
Bury	Holyrood	Valerie Morris	173	4.8%	5 out of 5	Details
Doncaster	Adwick	Vivien Woodrow	323	9.5%	3 out of 4	Details
Doncaster	Askern Spa	Malcolm Woodrow	574	14.3%	3 out of 4	Details
Doncaster	Bentley	Tony Wagstaffe	739	23.3%	2 out of 3	Details
Doncaster	Bessacarr & Cantley	Keith Hewitt	756	15.9%	4 out of 4	Details
Doncaster	Edenthorpe, Kirk Sandall & Barnby Dun	Fred Gee	655	14.8%	4 out of 5	Details
Doncaster	Edlington & Warmsworth	John Brennan	512	13.2%	3 out of 5	Details
Doncaster	Finningley	Nigel Berry	1,137	21.2%	3 out of 4	Details
Doncaster	Great North Road	Steve Grocott	492	10.8%	4 out of 6	Details
Doncaster	Hatfield	Mick Glynn	673	17.5%	2 out of 6	Details
Doncaster	Sprotbrough	Barbara Hewitt	662	15.6%	3 out of 4	Details
Doncaster	Stainforth & Moorends	Margaret Holt-Taylor	394	12.7%	3 out of 6	Details
Doncaster	Wheatley	Roy Penketh	786	22.9%	2 out of 4	Details
Kirklees	Denby Dale	Paul McEnhill	276	4.5%	5 out of 6	Details
Leeds	Ardsley & Robin Hood	Joanna Beverley	880	15.0%	3 out of 5	Details
Leeds	Morley North	Tom Redmond	573	8.3%	4 out of 5	Details
Leeds	Morley South	Chris Beverley	1,245	19.6%	3 out of 5	Details
Liverpool	Central	Steven Greenhalgh	83	4.3%	5 out of 5	Details
Liverpool	Old Swan	Steven McEllenborough	58	1.4%	8 out of 8	Details
Liverpool	St Michael's	Neil Kenny	29	0.7%	7 out of 7	Details
Liverpool	Warbreck	Lee Walton	55	1.4%	6 out of 7	Details
Salford	Little Hulton	David Johnson	200	8.7%	3 out of 5	Details
Salford	Walkden North	Laurence Depares	193	7.8%	3 out of 5	Details
Salford	Walkden South	Paul Whitelegg	117	3.3%	5 out of 5	Details
Sefton	Derby	Dean McGrane	55	2.0%	5 out of 5	Details
Solihull	Dorridge & Hockley Heath	Andrew Taylor	177	3.9%	5 out of 6	Details
Solihull	Elmdon	Robert Lassen	118	3.0%	5 out of 7	Details
Solihull	Knowle	Frank O'Brien	193	4.5%	5 out of 6	Details
Solihull	Lyndon	David Reynolds	258	6.5%	4 out of 7	Details
Tameside	Ashton St Michael's	David Timpson	239	8.3%	3 out of 5	Details
Walsall	Pheasey Park Farm	Christopher Newey	210	5.7%	4 out of 5	Details

Source: Local Elections Archive Project

=== 2012 ===
Authority	Ward	Candidate	Votes	%	Posn/no. cands	Details
Barnsley	Central	Colin Porter	286	14.1%	3 out of 4	Details
Barnsley	Cudworth	Carol Stacey	115	4.8%	5 out of 5	Details
Barnsley	Darfield	David Burnett	209	8.5%	3 out of 4	Details
Barnsley	Darton East	Sharon Sutton	185	7.2%	4 out of 5	Details
Barnsley	Darton West	Ian Sutton	505	19.4%	2 out of 3	Details
Barnsley	Hoyland Milton	Justin Saxton	243	9.0%	3 out of 5	Details
Barnsley	Kingstone	Nathan Walker	120	6.4%	3 out of 5	Details
Barnsley	Old Town	David Peace	206	7.8%	4 out of 5	Details
Barnsley	Rockingham	Kevin Riddiough	253	9.0%	3 out of 4	Details
Barnsley	Royston	Paul Robinson	73	3.1%	5 out of 5	Details
Barnsley	St Helens	Dean Walker	222	13.1%	2 out of 3	Details
Barnsley	Wombwell	Gary Carnell	192	8.0%	3 out of 4	Details
Birmingham	Oscott	Chris Newey	226	5.0%	3 out of 6	Details
Bolton	Horwich North East	Anthony Backhouse	291	8.5%	5 out of 5	Details
Bolton	Westhoughton South	Derek Bullock	297	10.1%	5 out of 5	Details
Bury	Besses	Stephen Morris	367	15.3%	2 out of 4	Details
Bury	Holyrood	Valerie Morris	186	5.6%	4 out of 4	Details
Doncaster	Bentley	Barbara Hewitt	681	25.1%	2 out of 3	Details
Doncaster	Bessacarr & Cantley	Glenn Bluff	535	12.9%	4 out of 4	Details
Doncaster	Central	Howard Dove	533	17.7%	2 out of 4	Details
Doncaster	Edenthorpe, Kirk Sandall & Barnby Dun	Keith Hewitt	731	19.9%	2 out of 5	Details
Doncaster	Finningley	Nigel Berry	1,163	26.0%	3 out of 4	Details
Doncaster	Hatfield	Mick Glynn	827	26.0%	2 out of 5	Details
Doncaster	Wheatley	Roy Penketh	806	28.3%	2 out of 3	Details
Kirklees	Dewsbury South	Shaun Maddox	566	9.3%	3 out of 6	Details
Leeds	Ardsley & Robin Hood	Joanna Beverley	787	17.1%	3 out of 4	Details
Leeds	Beeston & Holbeck	Ian Gibson	298	7.7%	4 out of 6	Details
Leeds	Bramley & Stanningley	Dean Locke	307	7.2%	5 out of 6	Details
Leeds	Cross Gates & Whinmoor	John Ashton	176	3.4%	6 out of 6	Details
Leeds	Garforth & Swillington	John Ashton	544	9.0%	3 out of 4	Details
Leeds	Killingbeck & Seacroft	Sam Kelly	487	11.1%	2 out of 4	Details
Leeds	Morley North	Tom Redmond	458	8.0%	4 out of 4	Details
Leeds	Morley South	Chris Beverley	811	15.1%	3 out of 4	Details
Leeds	Rothwell	Bernie Allen	120	2.2%	5 out of 5	Details
Leeds	Temple Newsam	Jordan Fawcett	370	6.3%	4 out of 5	Details
Leeds	Weetwood	Alan Procter	236	4.3%	5 out of 6	Details
Liverpool	Croxteth	Lee Walton	86	3.1%	4 out of 7	Details
Liverpool	Old Swan	Steven Greenhalgh	111	3.1%	6 out of 7	Details
Liverpool	Riverside	Neil Kenny	103	3.1%	5 out of 6	Details
Liverpool	Warbreck	Steven McEllenborough	216	6.2%	3 out of 6	Details
Rochdale	Kingsway	Ricky Akehurst	215	7.9%	4 out of 4	Details
Salford	Swinton North	Paul Officer	176	6.7%	4 out of 6	Details
Salford	Swinton South	John Mulcahy	112	4.8%	6 out of 7	Details
Salford	Walkden North	Laurence Depares	101	5.2%	4 out of 5	Details
Salford	Walkden South	Paul Whitelegg	117	3.3%	5 out of 5	Details
Sheffield	Birley	David Wildgoose	174	4.3%	6 out of 6	Details
Solihull	Dorridge & Hockley Heath	Andrew Taylor	187	6.8%	4 out of 5	Details
Solihull	Elmdon	Robert Lassen	239	8.6%	4 out of 5	Details
Solihull	Knowle	Frank O'Brien	157	5.4%	5 out of 5	Details
Solihull	Lyndon	David Reynolds	268	9.9%	4 out of 5	Details
Solihull	Shirley East	Lisa White	264	9.4%	4 out of 5	Details
Tameside	Ashton St Michael's	David Timpson	283	11.5%	3 out of 4	Details
Tameside	Dukinfield Stalybridge	Gregory Shorrock	364	13.3%	3 out of 5	Details
Tameside	Stalybridge North	Andrew Fogg	188	7.0%	3 out of 5	Details
Wakefield	Wakefield West	Norman Tate	594	17.6%	3 out of 4	Details
Walsall	Birchills Leamore	Christopher Newey	128	5.8%	4 out of 6	Details
Walsall	Short Heath	Malcolm Moore	151	6.5%	5 out of 5	Details
Walsall	Willenhall North	Christopher Haywood	94	3.8%	5 out of 5	Details

Source: Local Elections Archive Project

=== 2014 ===
Authority	Ward	Candidate	Votes	%	Posn/no. cands	Details
Barnsley	Central	Colin Porter	481	20.3%	2 out of 4	Details
Barnsley	Darfield	David Burnett	633	27.4%	2 out of 3	Details
Barnsley	Darton East	Paul Robinson	501	19.0%	2 out of 4	Details
Barnsley	Darton West	Ian Sutton	715	26.9%	2 out of 3	Details
Barnsley	Rockingham	Kevin Riddiough	69	2.4%	5 out of 6	Details
Barnsley	St Helens	Dean Walker	382	19.8%	2 out of 4	Details
Bolton	Westhoughton South	Derek Bullock	97	3.0%	5 out of 5	Details
Bury	Besses	Stephen Morris	412	16.5%	3 out of 5	Details
Bury	Unsworth	Valerie Morris	102	3.3%	4 out of 5	Details
Doncaster	Adwick	Joanne Allen	180	5.9%	5 out of 5 (joint)	Details
Doncaster	Bessacarr & Cantley	Barbara Hewitt	263	6.6%	5 out of 7	Details
Doncaster	Edenthorpe, Kirk Sandall & Barnby Dun	Keith Hewitt	198	5.6%	4 out of 5	Details
Doncaster	Edlington & Warmsworth	John Brennan	121	3.6%	5 out of 7	Details
Doncaster	Mexborough	Brian Whitmore	82	2.5%	5 out of 5 (joint)	Details
Doncaster	Rossington	Carol Young	180	5.9%	5 out of 5	Details
Doncaster	Sprotbrough	David Allen	217	6.2%	5 out of 5	Details
Kirklees	Dewsbury South	Shaun Maddox	608	10.9%	3 out of 5	Details
Knowsley	Stockbridge	Mark Syme	97	8.2%	3 out of 3	Details
Liverpool	Knotty Ash	Derek Grue	57	1.8%	6 out of 7	Details
Liverpool	Old Swan	Steven Greenhalgh	21	0.6%	8 out of 8	Details
Liverpool	St Michael's	Paul Rimmer	60	1.7%	6 out of 7	Details
Liverpool	Warbreck	Steven McEllenborough	40	1.2%	6 out of 7	Details
Salford	Swinton North	Paul Officer	115	4.3%	4 out of 4	Details
Salford	Walkden North	Laurence Depares	84	3.6%	5 out of 6	Details
Salford	Walkden South	Paul Whitelegg	55	1.8%	5 out of 5	Details
Walsall	Bloxwich West	Chris Newey	61	2.0%	5 out of 5	Details
Walsall	Willenhall South	Charles Haywood	69	2.2%	5 out of 5	Details

Source: Local Elections Archive Project

=== 2015 ===
Authority	Ward	Candidate	Votes	%	Posn/no. cands	Details
Barnsley	Central	Colin Porter	480	11.2%	3 out of 5	Details
Barnsley	Darfield	David Burnett	183	4.1%	4 out of 4	Details
Barnsley	Darton East	Sharon Sutton	367	7.2%	4 out of 5	Details
Barnsley	Darton West	Ian Sutton	855	16.3%	3 out of 3	Details
Barnsley	Hoyland Milton	Justin Saxton	101	1.9%	6 out of 6	Details
Barnsley	Rockingham	Kevin Riddiough	192	3.8%	4 out of 5	Details
Barnsley	St Helens	Dean Walker	423	11.2%	2 out of 4	Details
Bury	Besses	Stephen Morris	67	1.3%	6 out of 6	Details
Doncaster	Bentley	Keith Hewitt	634	4.5%	7 out of 9	Details
Doncaster	Bessacarr	Barbara Hewitt	364	2.0%	14 out of 14	Details
Doncaster	Conisbrough	John Brennan	405	2.5%	10 out of 10	Details
Kirklees	Dewsbury South	Shaun Maddox	858	10.0%	3 out of 6	Details
Liverpool	Knotty Ash	Derek Grue	16	0.2%	8 out of 8	Details
Liverpool	Princes Park	Steven Greenhalgh	19	0.3%	6 out of 6	Details
Liverpool	Riverside	Michael Lane	110	1.5%	6 out of 6	Details
Liverpool	St Michael's	Paul Rimmer	9	0.1%	7 out of 7	Details
Liverpool	Warbreck	Steven McEllenborough	25	0.3%	8 out of 8	Details
Walsall	Blakenall	Chris Newey	42	1.0%	6 out of 6	Details

Source: Local Elections Archive Project

=== 2016 ===
Authority	Ward	Candidate	Votes	%	Posn/no. cands	Details
Barnsley	Central	Colin Porter	314	16.6%	2 out of 5	Details
Barnsley	Hoyland Milton	Justin Saxton	123	5.2%	4 out of 6	Details
Barnsley	Rockingham	Kevin Riddiough	122	5.0%	4 out of 5	Details
Bury	Besses	Stephen Morris	280	11.5%	3 out of 5	Details
Liverpool	Riverside	Michael Lane	110	3.2%	5 out of 5	Details
Liverpool	St Michael's	Paul Rimmer	53	1.5%	5 out of 6	Details
Liverpool	Warbreck	Steven McEllenborough	127	4.1%	4 out of 6	Details
Salford	Swinton South	Craig Holmes	43	1.8%	6 out of 7	Details
Walsall	Rushall-Shelfield	Chris Newey	52	1.9%	5 out of 5	Details

Source: Local Elections Archive Project

=== 2018 ===
Authority	Ward	Candidate	Votes	%	Posn/no. cands	Details
Barnsley	Rockingham	Kevin Riddiough	235	11.1%	3 out of 4	Details
Bury	Besses	Stephen Morris	169	7.1%	3 out of 5	Details
Salford	Swinton South	Craig Holmes	163	7.4%	3 out of 6	Details

Source: Local Elections Archive Project

=== 2019 ===
Authority	Ward	Candidate	Votes	%	Posn/no. cands	Details
Barnsley	Darfield	Maxine Spencer	191	9.7%	4 out of 5	Details
Barnsley	Dearne North	Janus Polenceusz	485	34.2%	2 out of 3	Details
Barnsley	Dearne South	Adrian Morgan	175	7.7%	3 out of 4	Details
Barnsley	Hoyland Milton	Justin Saxton	134	6.0%	5 out of 5	Details
Barnsley	Rockingham	Kevin Riddiough	274	12.5%	3 out of 6	Details
Barnsley	Wombwell	Jon Seymour	186	11.2%	3 out of 5	Details
Bury	Besses	Stephen Morris	288	13.8%	3 out of 5	Details
Leeds	Bramley & Stanningley	Dean Locke	109	2.7%	7 out of 7	Details

Source: Local Elections Archive Project

=== 2021 ===
Authority	Ward	Candidate	Votes	%	Posn/no. cands	Details
Barnsley	Dearne North	Maxine Spencer	162	9.4%	3 out of 5	Details
Barnsley	Dearne South	Janus Polenceusz	74	3.3%	4 out of 5	Details
Barnsley	Wombwell	Jon Seymour	103	4.2%	5 out of 7	Details
Bury	Besses	Stephen Morris	139	5.06%	4 out of 5	Details

=== 2022 ===
Authority	Ward	Candidate	Votes	%	Posn/no. cands	Details
Barnsley	Dearne North	Maxine Spencer	128	8.3%	3 out of 5	Details
Barnsley	Dearne South	Janus Polenceusz	101	5.5%	4 out of 5	Details
Bury	Besses	Stephen Morris	166	2.4%	10 out of 11	Details
