= 2007 Calderdale Metropolitan Borough Council election =

2007 UK local government election

- 3 May 2007

17 of 51 seats on Calderdale Metropolitan Borough Council 26 seats needed for a majority

	First party	Second party	Third party
Party	Conservative	Liberal Democrats	Labour
Seats before	18	16	10
Seats won	7	6	4
Seats after	18	16	11
Seat change	Steady	Steady	▲1
Popular vote	15,592	13,424	13,494
Percentage	28.6%	24.6%	24.7%
Swing	▼0.2%	▼0.5%	▲1.2%
Leader before election
Conservative
Leader after election
Conservative

2007 local election results in Calderdale

Elections to Calderdale Metropolitan Borough Council were held on 3 May 2007 with the exception of the Warley ward which was postponed until 14 June 2007 due to the sudden death of one of the candidates. One third of the council was up for election and the council stayed under no overall control with a minority Conservative administration. The total turnout of the election was 38.01% (51,586 voters of an electorate of 135,729). The winning candidate in each ward is highlighted in bold.

Brighouse Councillor Nick Yates, who had left the Conservative Party in 2006 to become an Independent, joined the Liberal Democrats in the summer of 2007.

The table below summarises the results of the 2007 local government election. Each party is ordered by number of votes registered. 17 of the 51 seats were up for re-election.

== Council results ==
Percentage change calculated compared to the previous election's results.

2007 Calderdale Metropolitan Borough Council election
Party	Candidates						Votes		
Party	Stood	Elected	Gained	Unseated	Net	% of total	%	No.	Net %
Conservative	15	7	1	1	Steady	41.2	28.6	15,592	▼0.2
Labour	17	4	1	0	▲1	23.5	24.7	13,494	▲1.2
Liberal Democrats	17	6	1	1	Steady	35.3	24.6	13,424	▼0.5
BNP	13	0	0	1	▼1	0.0	10.8	5,904	▼0.1
English Democrat	5	0	0	0	Steady	0.0	3.5	1,891	▲3.5
Independent	4	0	0	0	Steady	0.0	3.0	1,661	▼6.1
Green	4	0	0	0	Steady	0.0	2.7	1,459	▲0.2
Respect	1	0	0	0	Steady	0.0	2.1	1,147	▲0.2

== Council Composition ==
Prior to the election the composition of the council was:

↓
**18**	**16**	**10**	**4**	**2**	**1**
**Conservative**	**Lib Dem**	**Labour**	**Ind**	**BN**	**ED**

After the election the composition of the council was:

↓
**18**	**16**	**11**	**4**	**1**	**1**
**Conservative**	**Lib Dem**	**Labour**	**Ind**	**BN**	**ED**

Party	Previous council	New council
Conservative	18	18
Liberal Democrats	16	16
Labour	10	11
Independent	4	4
BNP	2	1
English Democrat	1	1
Total	51	51

== Ward results ==
Percentage change calculated compared to the last time these candidates stood for election.

=== Brighouse ward ===
Brighouse ward
Party	Candidate	Votes	%	±%
**Conservative**	**Joyce Cawthra**	**1,274**	**38.5**	**−4.7**
Labour	Daniel Alan Coll	1,023	30.9	+6.7
Liberal Democrats	Luke William Wickham	372	11.2	+2.0
BNP	Jane Shooter	361	10.9	+10.9
English Democrat	Richard Thomas Langford	282	8.5	+8.5
Majority		251	7.6	−
Turnout		3,312	39.15	−11.3
Conservative **hold**		Swing		

The incumbent was Joyce Cawthra for the Conservative Party.

=== Calder ward ===
Calder ward
Party	Candidate	Votes	%	±%
**Liberal Democrats**	**David William O'Neill**	**1,331**	**39.1**	**+6.4**
Labour	Stewart Brown	1,254	36.8	+10.8
Green	Ruby Rose Joy Berridge	821	24.1	+2.5
Majority		77	2.3	−
Turnout		3,406	39.14	−13.8
Liberal Democrats **hold**		Swing		

The incumbent was Michael Taylor for the Liberal Democrats.

=== Elland ward ===
Elland ward
Party	Candidate	Votes	%	±%
**Liberal Democrats**	**Diane Park**	**1,318**	**48.7**	**+8.5**
Conservative	John Foran	586	21.7	−4.9
English Democrat	Michael John Clarke	408	15.1	+15.1
Labour	Marion Simone Batten	393	14.5	−0.8
Majority		732	27.1	−
Turnout		2,705	33.56	−7.9
Liberal Democrats **hold**		Swing		

The incumbent was Edgar Waller for the Liberal Democrats.

=== Greetland and Stainland ward ===
Greetland and Stainland ward
Party	Candidate	Votes	%	±%
**Liberal Democrats**	**Peter Joseph Wardhaugh**	**1,607**	**53.3**	**+6.4**
Conservative	Christian Corkish	714	23.7	−3.7
Labour	Pamela Margaret Fellows	288	9.6	−4.1
BNP	Paddy Hall	251	8.3	−5.4
Green	Mark Richard Mullany	153	5.1	−6.5
Majority		893	29.6	−
Turnout		3,013	36.25	−9.55
Liberal Democrats **hold**		Swing		

The incumbent was Patrick Phillips for the Liberal Democrats.

=== Hipperholme and Lightcliffe ward ===
Hipperholme and Lightcliffe ward
Party	Candidate	Votes	%	±%
**Conservative**	**David Kirton**	**1,503**	**45.6**	**+3.5**
Independent	Chris O'Connor	1,073	32.5	+4.0
Labour	Keith John Butterick	496	15.0	−8.7
Liberal Democrats	Malcolm Graham James	225	6.8	−1.6
Majority		430	13.0	−
Turnout		3,297	39.87	−11.73
Conservative **hold**		Swing		

The incumbent was David Kirton for the Conservative Party.

=== Illingworth and Mixenden ward ===
Illingworth and Mixenden ward
Party	Candidate	Votes	%	±%
**Labour**	**Barry Kaye Collins**	**1,369**	**42.6**	**+12.0**
BNP	Richard Mulhall	974	30.3	−3.4
Conservative	John Cecil David Hardy	612	19.0	−4.3
Liberal Democrats	Michael Elder	178	5.5	−5.2
Independent	Sean Vincent Loftus	83	2.6	+2.6
Majority		395	12.3	−
Turnout		3,216	35.38	−10.8
Labour **gain** from BNP		Swing		

The incumbent was Richard Mulhall for the BNP.

=== Luddendenfoot ward ===
Luddendenfoot ward
Party	Candidate	Votes	%	±%
**Conservative**	**Richard Hugh Marshall**	**1,067**	**33.6**	**+1.1**
Liberal Democrats	John Christopher Beacroft-Mitchell	1,065	33.6	−6.3
Labour	James Fearon	611	19.3	−0.3
BNP	John Derek Gregory	426	13.4	−4.9
Majority		2	0.1	−
Turnout		3,169	42.08	−10.5
Conservative **gain** from Liberal Democrats		Swing		

The incumbent was Jane Brown for the Liberal Democrats.

=== Northowram and Shelf ward ===
Northowram and Shelf ward
Party	Candidate	Votes	%	±%
**Conservative**	**Roger Laurence Taylor**	**1,903**	**53.8**	**+2.2**
Labour Co-op	Gary Rae	788	22.3	+4.7
BNP	Ann Jackson	515	14.6	−8.9
Liberal Democrats	Michael Alfred Smith	331	9.4	−1.6
Majority		1,115	31.5	−
Turnout		3,537	40.05	9.8
Conservative **hold**		Swing		

The incumbent was Roger Taylor for the Conservative Party.

=== Ovenden ward ===
Ovenden ward
Party	Candidate	Votes	%	±%
**Labour Co-op**	**Bryan Thomas Raymond Smith**	**1,003**	**43.2**	**+2.8**
BNP	Chris Godridge	691	29.7	−0.5
Conservative	Sally Victoria McCartney	394	17.0	+3.7
Liberal Democrats	Robert Ward	235	10.1	−2.3
Majority		312	13.4	−
Turnout		2,323	27.91	−12.9
Labour Co-op **hold**		Swing		

The incumbent was Bryan Smith for the Labour Party.

=== Park ward ===
Park ward
Party	Candidate	Votes	%	±%
**Labour**	**Arshad Mahmood**	**1,500**	**35.4**	**−4.6**
Respect	Sajid Mehmood	1,147	27.1	+27.1
Liberal Democrats	Shazad Fazal	1,022	24.1	+7.2
English Democrat	Shakir Saghir	567	13.4	+13.4
Majority		353	8.3	−
Turnout		4,236	49.45	−17.9
Labour **hold**		Swing		

The incumbent was Arshad Mahmmod for the Labour Party.

=== Rastrick ward ===
Rastrick ward
Party	Candidate	Votes	%	±%
**Conservative**	**Craig Whittaker**	**1,336**	**43.0**	**−2.6**
Labour	Ann Martin	782	25.2	−5.6
English Democrat	David Vincent Stevenson	418	13.5	+13.5
Liberal Democrats	Cheryl Elizabeth Stovin	292	9.4	−9.3
BNP	Katie Jane Gill	278	9.0	+9.0
Majority		554	17.8	−
Turnout		3,106	36.68	−8.3
Conservative **hold**		Swing		

The incumbent was John Williamson for the Conservative Party.

=== Ryburn ward ===
Ryburn ward
Party	Candidate	Votes	%	±%
**Conservative**	**Robert Ernest Thornber**	**1,570**	**50.1**	**+5.5**
Liberal Democrats	Ashley John Richard Evans	768	24.5	−1.3
Labour	John Butterworth	541	17.3	−10.3
BNP	John Andrew Greenaway	256	8.2	+8.2
Majority		802	25.6	−
Turnout		3,135	37.23	−10.3
Conservative **hold**		Swing		

The incumbent was Robert Thornber for the Conservative Party.

=== Skircoat ward ===
Skircoat ward
Party	Candidate	Votes	%	±%
**Liberal Democrats**	**Stephen Alexander Gow**	**1,716**	**43.5**	**+21.3**
Conservative	John Frank Brearley Ford	1,301	33.0	−15.0
Labour	Anne Collins	449	11.4	−7.7
BNP	Anthony Shane Bentley	317	8.0	−4.9
Green	Simon Christopher Turner	159	4.0	+4.0
Majority		415	10.5	−
Turnout		3,942	42.55	−9.4
Liberal Democrats **gain** from Conservative		Swing		

The incumbent was John Ford for the Conservative Party.

=== Sowerby Bridge ward ===
Sowerby Bridge ward
Party	Candidate	Votes	%	±%
**Conservative**	**Andrew David Feather**	**1,054**	**35.7**	**+2.4**
Labour Co-op	Dave Draycott	957	32.4	+7.7
BNP	Tom Bates	539	18.3	−1.5
Liberal Democrats	Brendan Robert Stubbs	402	13.6	−4.3
Majority		97	3.3	−
Turnout		2,952	37.51	−8.5
Conservative **hold**		Swing		

The incumbent was Andrew Feather for the Conservative Party.

=== Todmorden ward ===
Todmorden ward
Party	Candidate	Votes	%	±%
**Liberal Democrats**	**Olwen Jean Arlette Jennings**	**1,017**	**32.0**	**−7.8**
Conservative	Ian Cooper	711	22.4	−7.9
Labour	Jennifer Rosemary Jackson	698	22.0	−5.8
BNP	Christian Michael Jackson	424	13.4	+13.4
Green	Leo Vincent	326	10.3	+10.3
Majority		306	9.6	−
Turnout		3,176	37.31	−6.7
Liberal Democrats **hold**		Swing		

The incumbent was Olwen Jennings for the Liberal Democrats.

=== Town ward ===
Town ward
Party	Candidate	Votes	%	±%
**Labour**	**Timothy John Swift**	**1,342**	**47.8**	**+17.9**
Conservative	Chris Pillai	540	19.2	−3.3
BNP	Stuart Brian Gill	537	19.1	−9.3
Liberal Democrats	John Boje Frederiksen	226	8.0	−2.6
English Democrat	David Mounsey	165	5.9	+5.9
Majority		802	28.5	−
Turnout		2,810	33.40	−12.3
Labour **hold**		Swing		

The incumbent was Timothy Swift for the Labour Party.

=== Warley ward ===
The election for this ward seat was postponed by the sudden death of the Conservative candidate Richard Maycock. He was replaced by John Foran, who had stood in the Elland ward above. The new election date was held on 14 June 2007.

Warley ward
Party	Candidate	Votes	%	±%
**Liberal Democrats**	**Jennifer Pearson**	**1,319**	**46.0**	**+18.0**
Conservative	John Foran	418	14.6	−11.2
Independent	Jenny Carr	360	12.6	−14.4
BNP	Julie Ann Baxter	335	11.7	−8.4
Labour	Ilyas Najib	236	8.2	−4.0
Independent	Adrian Grenville Greenwood	145	5.1	+5.1
English Democrat	Faizan Saghir	51	1.8	+1.8
Majority		901	31.4	−
Turnout		2,868	34.02	−17.7
Liberal Democrats **hold**		Swing		

The incumbent was Jennifer Pearson for the Liberal Democrats.
