= 2004 Calderdale Metropolitan Borough Council election =

2004 UK local government election

← 2003	10 June 2004	2006 →

17 of 51 seats on Calderdale Metropolitan Borough Council 26 seats needed for a majority

	First party	Second party	Third party
Party	Conservative	Liberal Democrats	Labour
Seats before		16	10
Seats won	21	15	9
Seats after	21	15	9
Seat change	▼4	▼1	▼1
Popular vote	65,073	43,070	46,464
Percentage	36.0%	23.8%	25.7%
Leader before election
Conservative
Leader after election
Conservative

Elections to Calderdale Metropolitan Borough Council were held on 10 June 2004. The whole council was up for election with boundary changes since the last election in 2003. The council stayed under no overall control with a minority Conservative administration.

== Council results ==
2004 Calderdale Metropolitan Borough Council election
Party	Candidates						Votes		
Party	Stood	Elected	Gained	Unseated	Net	% of total	%	No.	Net %
Conservative	51	21	-	-	-	41.2	36.0	65,073	-
Labour	51	9	-	-	-	17.6	25.7	46,464	-
Liberal Democrats	51	15	-	-	-	29.4	23.8	43,070	-
BNP	14	3	-	-	-	5.9	7.4	13,456	-
Independent	9	3	-	-	-	5.9	5.3	9,613	-
Green	2	0	-	-	-	0.0	0.9	1,640	-
Red and Green	5	0	-	-	-	0.0	0.8	1,523	-

== Council Composition ==
After the election the composition of the council was:

↓
21	15	9	3	3
Conservative	Lib Dem	Labour	BNP	Ind

Party	New council
Conservative	21
Liberal Democrats	15
Labour	9
BNP	3
Independent	3
Total	51

== Ward results ==
=== Brighouse ward ===
Brighouse ward
Party	Candidate	Votes	%	±%
Conservative	Nicholas Yates	1,804	43.7	−
Conservative	Joyce Cawthra	1,782	43.2	−
Independent	Colin Stout	1,745	42.3	−
Conservative	Terence Roy Martin	1,349	32.7	−
Labour	Edith Ann Martin	1,138	27.6	−
Labour	Daniel Alan Coll	997	24.2	−
Labour	Paul Womersley	787	19.1	−
Liberal Democrats	Joan Wray	380	9.2	−
Liberal Democrats	Michael Dag Holmans	284	6.9	−
Liberal Democrats	Glen Michael Mattock	281	6.8	−
Turnout		4,126	50.5	

=== Calder ward ===
Calder ward
Party	Candidate	Votes	%	±%
Liberal Democrats	Janet Mary Battye	1,515	33.3	−
Liberal Democrats	Michael Francis Taylor	1,485	32.7	−
Liberal Democrats	Nader Fekri	1,436	31.6	−
Green	Paul Edward John Palmer	1,210	26.6	−
Labour	Stewart Brown	1,183	26.0	−
Conservative	Annette Jean Getty	1,062	23.4	−
Labour	Kari Hannah Mawhood	1,007	22.1	−
Labour	Susan Mary Press	1,000	22.0	−
Conservative	Beverley Anne Carter	934	20.5	−
Conservative	Barrie John Henderson	885	19.5	−
Red and Green	Louise Amanda Castro	347	7.6	−
Red and Green	Kenneth Albert Hall	259	5.7	−
Turnout		4,548	52.9	

=== Elland ward ===
Elland ward
Party	Candidate	Votes	%	±%
Liberal Democrats	Patricia May Allen	1,723	53.4	−
Liberal Democrats	Edgar Joseph Waller	1,295	40.2	−
Conservative	Michael John Clarke	1,174	36.4	−
Liberal Democrats	Robert Francis Thompson	1,147	35.6	−
Conservative	Ian Robert Pattinson	856	26.6	−
Conservative	David Rouse Lang	825	25.6	−
Labour	David Perkins	494	15.3	−
Labour	David John Tarlo	471	14.6	−
Labour	David Kenneth Young	464	14.4	−
Turnout		3,224	41.5	

=== Greetland and Stainland ward ===
Greetland and Stainland ward
Party	Candidate	Votes	%	±%
Liberal Democrats	Keith Watson	1,751	47.3	−
Liberal Democrats	Patrick Julyan Lancelot Napier Phillips	1,736	46.9	−
Liberal Democrats	Elizabeth Margaret Drake Ingleton	1,728	46.7	−
Conservative	Bryce Christian Corkish	1,014	27.4	−
Conservative	Irena Corkish	980	26.5	−
Conservative	David Charles Union	930	25.1	−
Labour	Nigel Patrick Ambler	506	13.7	−
Green	Mark Richard Mullany	430	11.6	−
Labour	Robert Good	335	9.1	−
Labour	Nicolas Clive Osborne	314	8.5	−
Turnout		3,701	45.8	

=== Hipperholme and Lightcliffe ward ===
Hipperholme and Lightcliffe ward
Party	Candidate	Votes	%	±%
Conservative	Graham Thomas Hall	1,921	46.9	−
Conservative	David Eric Kirton	1,726	42.1	−
Conservative	John Foran	1,684	41.1	−
Independent	Colin Raistrick	1,489	36.4	−
Independent	Adrian Christopher O'Connor	1,166	28.5	−
Labour	Keith John Butterick	970	23.7	−
Labour	Tracey Howton	503	12.3	−
Labour	David Johnston Groves	491	12.0	−
Liberal Democrats	Janet Linda Dickinson	343	8.4	−
Liberal Democrats	Jason Paul Jeffrey	308	7.5	−
Liberal Democrats	Penelope Susan Marrington	300	7.3	−
Turnout		4,095	51.6	

=== Illingworth and Mixenden ward ===
Illingworth and Mixenden ward
Party	Candidate	Votes	%	±%
Labour	Thomas Joseph McElroy	1,344	34.5	−
BNP	Richard Mulhall	1,314	33.7	−
BNP	Geoffrey James Wallace	1,208	31.0	−
Labour	David John Pickard	1,193	30.6	−
BNP	Thomas Lee Bates	1,186	30.4	−
Labour	Robert George Metcalfe	1,176	30.2	−
Conservative	Sandra Joslin	909	23.3	−
Conservative	Peter Byrne	665	17.1	−
Conservative	Kathleen Young	561	14.4	−
Liberal Democrats	Michael Murray Elder	416	10.7	−
Liberal Democrats	Myra Porteous Townley	353	9.1	−
Liberal Democrats	Brian Hewson	341	8.8	−
Turnout		3,896	46.2	

=== Luddendenfoot ward ===
Luddendenfoot ward
Party	Candidate	Votes	%	±%
Liberal Democrats	Christine Irene Bampton-Smith	1,620	42.3	−
Liberal Democrats	Jane Frances Leech Brown	1,529	39.9	−
Liberal Democrats	Peter Sephton Coles	1,377	35.9	−
Conservative	Richard Hugh Marshall	1,250	32.6	−
Conservative	Lorraine Mary Stott	899	23.4	−
Labour	Michelle Jane Foster	752	19.6	−
BNP	John Derek Gregory	700	18.3	−
Labour	Leslie Siddall	694	18.1	−
Labour	David Michael Wood	614	16.0	−
Conservative	Thiruvenkatar Krishnapillai	460	12.0	−
Turnout		3,834	52.6	

=== Northowram and Shelf ward ===
Northowram and Shelf ward
Party	Candidate	Votes	%	±%
Conservative	Graham Edward Alexander Reason	2,284	53.4	−
Conservative	Roger Laurence Taylor	2,205	51.6	−
Conservative	Stephen Baines	2,149	50.2	−
BNP	Susan Teresa Whittaker	1,007	23.5	−
Labour	Stanley Richard Sutcliffe	751	17.6	−
Labour	Richard Xenophon Scorer	531	12.4	−
Labour	Damitha Karawita	496	11.6	−
Liberal Democrats	Gavin Williamson Bone	471	11.0	−
Liberal Democrats	John Boje Frederiksen	381	8.9	−
Liberal Democrats	Margareta Holmstedt	378	8.8	−
Turnout		4,277	49.9	

=== Ovenden ward ===
Ovenden ward
Party	Candidate	Votes	%	±%
Labour	Linda June Riordan	1,263	40.7	−
Labour	Bryan Thomas Raymond Smith	1,254	40.4	−
Labour	Helen Josephine Rivron	1,189	38.3	−
BNP	Christopher Godridge	938	30.2	−
BNP	Jane Ann Shooter	900	29.0	−
BNP	Brian Darren Wainwright	894	28.8	−
Conservative	Keith Malcolm McDonald	412	13.3	−
Liberal Democrats	Venessa Jane Leech	386	12.4	−
Liberal Democrats	Hywel Morgan	366	11.8	−
Liberal Democrats	Josef Arthur Rez	272	8.8	−
Conservative	Riasat Hussain	209	6.7	−
Conservative	Choudry Mohammed Saleem	204	6.6	−
Turnout		3,103	40.8	

=== Park ward ===
Park ward
Party	Candidate	Votes	%	±%
Labour	Mohammed Najib	2,377	40.5	−
Labour	Arshad Mahmood	2,346	40.0	−
Labour	Zafar Iqbal-Din	2,264	38.6	−
Conservative	Chaudhary Mohammed Saghir	2,035	34.7	−
Conservative	Shakar Saghir	1,820	31.0	−
Conservative	Faizan Saghir	1,701	29.0	−
Liberal Democrats	Mohammed Ilyas	994	16.9	−
Liberal Democrats	Daniel Matthew Bailey	892	15.2	−
Liberal Democrats	Luke William Wickham	721	12.3	−
Independent	Waheed Yousaf	595	10.1	−
Red and Green	Juliet Clare Taylor	343	5.8	−
Red and Green	Charles Gate	300	5.1	−
Red and Green	Colin Wilson	274	4.7	−
Turnout		5,868	67.4	

=== Rastrick ward ===
Rastrick ward
Party	Candidate	Votes	%	±%
Conservative	Ann McAllister	1,805	48.0	−
Conservative	John Clarence Williamson	1,715	45.6	−
Conservative	Paul Graham Rogan	1,488	39.6	−
Labour	George Edward Richardson	1,158	30.8	−
Labour	Pamela Margaret Fellows	1,124	29.9	−
Labour	Jayne Sheridan	799	21.3	−
Liberal Democrats	Malcolm Graham James	702	18.7	−
Liberal Democrats	John Durkin	683	18.2	−
Liberal Democrats	Shirley Mavis Ring	648	17.2	−
Turnout		3,759	45.0	

=== Ryburn ward ===
Ryburn ward
Party	Candidate	Votes	%	±%
Conservative	Geraldine Mary Carter	1,800	46.9	−
Conservative	Robert Ernest Thornber	1,711	44.6	−
Conservative	Kay Barret	1,457	38.0	−
Liberal Democrats	Anthony Crowther	1,137	29.6	−
Labour	Judith Mary Gannon	1,059	27.6	−
Liberal Democrats	Ashley John Richard Evans	991	25.8	−
Liberal Democrats	Peter Joseph Wardhaugh	876	22.8	−
Labour	Catherine Mary Groves	608	15.8	−
Labour	Robin Dixon	596	15.5	−
Turnout		3,836	47.5	

=== Skircoat ward ===
Skircoat ward
Party	Candidate	Votes	%	±%
Conservative	Geoffrey Wainwright	2,367	52.4	−
Conservative	John Frank Brearley Ford	2,167	48.0	−
Conservative	Grenville Horsfall	1,948	43.1	−
Liberal Democrats	Stephen Alexander Gow	1,002	22.2	−
Labour	David Charles Russell	862	19.1	−
Liberal Democrats	Sheila Jackson	782	17.3	−
Labour	James Frederick Wilson	759	16.8	−
Labour	Maura Wilson	754	16.7	−
BNP	Stuart Brian Gill	582	12.9	−
Liberal Democrats	Rafael Hassan Babar	561	12.4	−
Turnout		4,518	52.0	

=== Sowerby Bridge ward ===
Sowerby Bridge ward
Party	Candidate	Votes	%	±%
Conservative	Amanda Louise Byrne	1,382	38.3	−
Conservative	Andrew David Feather	1,204	33.3	−
Conservative	Robert Philip Andrew Reynolds	1,155	32.0	
Labour	Anne Collins	891	24.7	−
Labour	Jill Rosemary Liddington	816	22.6	−
Labour	Gary Adrian Williams	752	20.8	−
Independent	Anne Marsden	749	20.7	−
BNP	Christian Michael Jackson	714	19.8	−
Liberal Democrats	Benjamin Brocklesby Brundell	648	17.9	−
Liberal Democrats	Elizabeth Ward	521	14.4	−
Liberal Democrats	Robert Ward	409	11.3	−
Turnout		3,612	46.0	

=== Todmorden ward ===
Todmorden ward
Party	Candidate	Votes	%	±%
Liberal Democrats	Ann Clare Townley	1,516	41.0	−
Liberal Democrats	Olwen Jean Arlette Jennings	1,473	39.8	−
Liberal Democrats	Ruth Goldthorpe	1,425	38.5	−
Conservative	Ian Cooper	1,119	30.3	−
Conservative	Darren Keith Midgley	1,079	29.2	−
Labour	Jennifer Rosemary Jackson	1,027	27.8	−
Labour	David Tattersall	976	26.4	−
Labour	John Lindsay Oldham	971	26.3	−
Conservative	Brian Matthew Carter	838	22.7	−
Turnout		3,698	44.0	

=== Town ward ===
Town ward
Party	Candidate	Votes	%	±%
Labour	Megan Kathleen Swift	1,192	32.5	−
Labour	Timothy John Swift	1,097	29.9	−
BNP	Adrian Paul Marsden	1,095	29.9	−
BNP	Robert Paul Taylor	1,041	28.4	−
Labour	Michael Donald Higgins	1,031	28.1	−
BNP	Michael Hall	1,023	27.9	−
Conservative	Janet Ellen Hardy	825	22.5	−
Conservative	Richard Francis Maycock	698	19.0	−
Conservative	Sally Victoria McCartney	698	19.0	−
Independent	Gwyneth Greenwood	411	11.2	−
Liberal Democrats	Harry Ward	387	10.6	−
Liberal Democrats	Cheryl Elizabeth Stovin	336	9.2	−
Liberal Democrats	Gian Chand Gabbi	262	7.1	−
Turnout		3,665	45.7	

=== Warley ward ===
Warley ward
Party	Candidate	Votes	%	±%
Independent	Allen Clegg	1,251	29.5	−
Liberal Democrats	Jennifer Pearson	1,190	28.0	−
Independent	Jennifer Mary Carr	1,148	27.0	−
Conservative	John Cecil David Hardy	1,094	25.8	−
Independent	William Edward Dickin	1,059	24.9	−
Conservative	Martin Howard Peel	942	22.2	−
Conservative	David Ian Ginley	892	21.0	−
BNP	Andrew Mellor	854	20.1	−
Liberal Democrats	Brendan Robert Stubbs	720	17.0	−
Liberal Democrats	John Christopher Beacroft-Mitchell	592	13.9	−
Labour	Lesley Anne Sleigh	520	12.2	−
Labour	Abdul Rahman	285	6.7	−
Labour	Mohammed Shazad Fazal	283	6.7	−
Turnout		4,247	51.7	
