= 2006 Newcastle City Council election =

2006 UK local government election

- 4 May 2006

26 of the 78 seats on Newcastle City Council 40 seats needed for a majority
- Turnout: 40.3% (▼6.3)
	First party	Second party
Party	Liberal Democrats	Labour
Seats won	16	10
Seats after	49	29
Seat change	▲1	▼1
Popular vote	34,960	25,959
Percentage	47.8%	35.5%
Swing	▲3.6%	▼0.4%
- Map of the results of the 2006 Newcastle council election. Labour in red and the Liberal Democrats in orange.
Council control before election
Liberal Democrats
Council control after election
Liberal Democrats

Elections to Newcastle City Council were held on 4 May 2006. One third of the council was up for election, with each successful candidate to serve a four-year term of office, expiring in 2010. The council stayed under Liberal Democrat control, with the party gaining one seat overall.

== Election result ==
Newcastle Council Election Result 2006
Party	This election			Full council			This election		
Party	Seats	Net	Seats %	Other	Total	Total %	Votes	Votes %	+/−
Liberal Democrats	16	▲1	61.5	33	49	62.8	34,960	47.8	▲3.6
Labour	10	▼1	38.5	19	29	37.2	25,959	35.5	▼0.4
Conservative	0	Steady	0.0	0	0	0.0	6,955	9.5	▼5.8
Green	0	Steady	0.0	0	0	0.0	2,327	3.2	▲2.0
BNP	0	Steady	0.0	0	0	0.0	2,010	2.7	▲1.7
English Democrat	0	Steady	0.0	0	0	0.0	354	0.5	▲0.4
Socialist	0	Steady	0.0	0	0	0.0	289	0.4	▲0.1
Respect	0	Steady	0.0	0	0	0.0	238	0.3	New
Communist	0	Steady	0.0	0	0	0.0	36	0.0	Steady

== Ward results ==
=== Benwell and Scotswood ===
Benwell and Scotswood
Party	Candidate	Votes	%	±%
Labour	Jeremy Beecham	1,695	51.4	−0.9
Liberal Democrats	John Mansfield	879	26.7	+8.5
BNP	Jonathan Keys	516	15.7	+0.2
Green	Laurence Ellacot	206	6.3	N/A
Majority		816	24.7	
Turnout			40.4	−3.7
Labour hold		Swing		

=== Blakelaw ===
Blakelaw
Party	Candidate	Votes	%	±%
Liberal Democrats	Charles Schardt	1,608	52.4	+12.4
Labour	William Dodds	1,219	39.8	+5.8
Conservative	Kenneth Wake	239	7.8	−0.1
Majority		389	12.6	
Turnout			40.4	−7.2
Liberal Democrats hold		Swing		

=== Byker ===
Byker
Party	Candidate	Votes	%	±%
Labour	Nicholas Kemp	1,322	59.5	+13.2
Liberal Democrats	Jan Rosen	611	27.5	+4.2
Socialist	Paul Owens	289	13.0	+0.3
Majority		711	32.0	
Turnout			31.8	−6.6
Labour hold		Swing		

=== Castle ===
Castle
Party	Candidate	Votes	%	±%
Liberal Democrats	Anita Lower	1,819	59.1	−1.1
Labour	June Mackinlay	795	25.8	+0.9
Conservative	Mark Laing	466	15.1	+0.2
Majority		1,024	33.3	
Turnout			41.7	−5.4
Liberal Democrats hold		Swing		

=== Dene ===
Dene
Party	Candidate	Votes	%	±%
Liberal Democrats	Sharon Bailey	2,047	66.9	+2.4
Labour	Graham Addy	600	19.6	+1.3
Conservative	Mary Toward	412	13.5	−3.7
Majority		1,447	47.3	
Turnout			42.7	−9.2
Liberal Democrats hold		Swing		

=== Denton ===
Denton
Party	Candidate	Votes	%	±%
Liberal Democrats	Sharon Middleton	2,219	64.5	+15.3
Labour	Eric Mackinlay	1,221	35.5	+1.9
Majority		998	29.0	
Turnout			43.7	−6.4
Liberal Democrats hold		Swing		

=== East Gosforth ===
East Gosforth
Party	Candidate	Votes	%	±%
Liberal Democrats	David Slesenger	1,956	58.4	+3.4
Labour	Richard Baker	628	18.8	−1.5
Conservative	Charlotte Ives	441	13.2	+0.2
Green	David Coombes	324	9.7	N/A
Majority		1,328	39.6	
Turnout			47.5	−9.1
Liberal Democrats hold		Swing		

=== Elswick ===
Elswick
Party	Candidate	Votes	%	±%
Labour	Derek Malcolm	1,015	44.6	−7.8
Liberal Democrats	Andrew McQuillin	587	25.8	−2.9
BNP	Kenneth Booth	437	19.2	N/A
Respect	Yunus Bakhsh	238	10.5	N/A
Majority		428	18.8	
Turnout			34.1	−5.7
Labour hold		Swing		

=== Fawdon ===
Fawdon
Party	Candidate	Votes	%	±%
Liberal Democrats	David Faulkner	1,675	54.4	+2.1
Labour	Keith Taylor	926	30.1	−4.3
English Democrat	Martin Thompson	354	11.5	+4.7
Conservative	John Catto	125	4.1	−2.4
Majority		749	24.3	
Turnout			43.5	−8.0
Liberal Democrats hold		Swing		

=== Fenham ===
Fenham
Party	Candidate	Votes	%	±%
Liberal Democrats	Patrick Morrissey	1,482	45.8	+23.0
Labour	Isabella Cooney	1,377	42.6	+5.5
Conservative	Duncan James	375	11.6	−8.7
Majority		105	3.2	
Turnout			42.5	−2.9
Liberal Democrats gain from Labour		Swing		

=== Kenton ===
Kenton
Party	Candidate	Votes	%	±%
Labour	Gerald Bell	1,436	52.4	+6.8
Liberal Democrats	David Turner	928	33.8	+8.4
Conservative	Tom Magen	378	13.8	−6.0
Majority		508	18.6	
Turnout			39.6	−7.4
Labour hold		Swing		

=== Lemington ===
Lemington
Party	Candidate	Votes	%	±%
Liberal Democrats	Robert Ash	1,591	56.1	+34.3
Labour	Ruth Robson	1,247	43.9	−8.7
Majority		344	12.2	
Turnout			38.9	−4.3
Liberal Democrats gain from Labour		Swing		

=== Newburn ===
Newburn
Party	Candidate	Votes	%	±%
Labour	Linda Wright	1,337	46.1	Steady
Liberal Democrats	Lawrence Hunter	875	30.2	+4.3
BNP	Alan Patterson	417	14.4	N/A
Conservative	Timothy Troman	269	9.3	−4.6
Majority		462	15.9	
Turnout			41.4	−7.3
Labour hold		Swing		

=== North Heaton ===
North Heaton
Party	Candidate	Votes	%	±%
Liberal Democrats	Gregory Stone	1,632	49.8	+2.9
Labour	Christopher Wilkie	815	24.9	+1.5
Conservative	Barry Flux	490	15.0	Steady
Green	Victoria Walpole	340	10.4	+1.5
Majority		817	24.9	
Turnout			43.3	−7.1
Liberal Democrats hold		Swing		

=== North Jesmond ===
North Jesmond
Party	Candidate	Votes	%	±%
Liberal Democrats	Anthony Rounthwaite	1,050	54.4	−0.9
Labour	Fiona Clarke	400	20.7	−1.2
Conservative	Claire McLaughlin	290	15.0	−0.8
Green	John Pearson	190	9.8	N/A
Majority		650	33.7	
Turnout			35.3	−5.6
Liberal Democrats hold		Swing		

=== Ouseburn ===
Ouseburn
Party	Candidate	Votes	%	±%
Liberal Democrats	Gareth Kane	773	49.4	−11.3
Labour	Farah McArdle	461	29.5	−1.9
Green	Alastair Bonnett	214	13.7	N/A
Conservative	Ann Wake	117	7.5	−0.4
Majority		312	19.9	
Turnout			28.0	−10.1
Liberal Democrats hold		Swing		

=== Parklands ===
Parklands
Party	Candidate	Votes	%	±%
Liberal Democrats	Diane Packham	2,247	64.2	+2.5
Conservative	Neville Armstrong	738	21.1	+3.0
Labour	Antoine Tinnion	387	11.1	−2.1
Green	Geoffrey Parkin	130	3.7	N/A
Majority		1,509	43.1	
Turnout			49.4	−7.9
Liberal Democrats hold		Swing		

=== South Heaton ===
South Heaton
Party	Candidate	Votes	%	±%
Labour	Geraldine Ormonde	961	48.4	+14.4
Liberal Democrats	Henry Gallager	748	37.7	+0.9
Green	Duncan Couchman	176	8.9	−5.3
Conservative	Stephen Brownlee	100	5.0	−2.9
Majority		213	10.7	
Turnout			41.3	−4.3
Labour hold		Swing		

=== South Jesmond ===
South Jesmond
Party	Candidate	Votes	%	±%
Liberal Democrats	Thomas Woodwark	864	50.1	−9.1
Labour	Christopher Bartlett	368	21.4	−1.7
Conservative	Christopher Martin	291	16.9	−0.8
Green	Malcolm Shiel	200	11.6	N/A
Majority		496	28.7	
Turnout			33.1	−3.1
Liberal Democrats hold		Swing		

=== Walker ===
Walker
Party	Candidate	Votes	%	±%
Labour	John Stokel-Walker	1,797	69.0	+8.9
Liberal Democrats	Annie Gravell	462	17.7	−1.9
BNP	John Mitchell	310	11.9	+0.5
Communist	Martin Levy	36	1.4	−0.4
Majority		1,335	51.3	
Turnout			35.0	−4.1
Labour hold		Swing		

=== Walkergate ===
Walkergate
Party	Candidate	Votes	%	±%
Liberal Democrats	David Besag	1,770	58.2	+1.4
Labour	Maureen Lowson	1,116	36.7	−0.7
Conservative	Marian McWilliams	155	5.1	−0.7
Majority		654	21.5	
Turnout			43.9	−9.2
Liberal Democrats hold		Swing		

=== West Gosforth ===
West Gosforth
Party	Candidate	Votes	%	±%
Liberal Democrats	William Shepherd	1,961	52.3	+11.2
Conservative	Brian Moore	1,141	30.4	+0.6
Labour	John Foley	431	11.5	−2.4
Green	Dawn Shiel	217	5.8	N/A
Majority		820	21.9	
Turnout			50.9	−6.5
Liberal Democrats hold		Swing		

=== Westerhope ===
Westerhope
Party	Candidate	Votes	%	±%
Liberal Democrats	Neil Hamilton	2,177	57.0	+15.5
Labour	Brian Hunter	1,150	30.1	−1.7
Conservative	John Gough	491	12.9	−13.8
Majority		1,027	26.9	
Turnout			49.9	−10.3
Liberal Democrats hold		Swing		

=== Westgate ===
Westgate
Party	Candidate	Votes	%	±%
Labour	Geoffrey O'Brien	704	45.0	−6.0
Liberal Democrats	Catherine Pagan	531	33.9	+0.3
BNP	Daniel Thorlby	173	11.0	N/A
Green	Pamela Woolner	158	10.1	N/A
Majority		173	11.1	
Turnout			29.2	−3.6
Labour hold		Swing		

=== Wingrove ===
Wingrove
Party	Candidate	Votes	%	±%
Labour	Joyce McCarty	1,031	39.9	+6.1
Liberal Democrats	Muhammed Ali	994	38.5	+2.3
Conservative	Jacqueline McNally	227	8.8	−8.3
Green	Peter Hilton	172	6.7	−6.1
BNP	Vivien Browne	157	6.1	N/A
Majority		37	1.4	
Turnout			36.4	−4.2
Labour hold		Swing		

=== Woolsington ===
Woolsington
Party	Candidate	Votes	%	±%
Labour	George Pattison	1,520	47.4	+13.4
Liberal Democrats	William Thorkildsen	1,474	46.0	−0.8
Conservative	Sharmilee Rau	210	6.6	−5.4
Majority		46	1.4	
Turnout			43.2	−5.4
Labour gain from Liberal Democrats		Swing		

== By-elections ==
=== Lemington ===
Lemington by-election 30 November 2006 Replacing John Gordon (Labour)
Party	Candidate	Votes	%	±%
Liberal Democrats	Lawrence Hunter	1,180	46.7	−9.4
Labour	Ruth Robson	815	32.2	−11.7
BNP	Kenneth Booth	383	15.2	N/A
Conservative	Jason Smith	147	5.8	N/A
Majority		365	14.5	
Turnout		2,525	34.1	−4.8
Liberal Democrats gain from Labour		Swing		
