= 2006 Calderdale Metropolitan Borough Council election =

2006 UK local government election

- 4 May 2006

18 of the 51 seats on Calderdale Metropolitan Borough Council 26 seats needed for a majority
	First party	Second party	Third party
Party	Conservative	Liberal Democrats	Labour
Seats won	6	5	4
Seats after	20	16	10
Seat change	▼1	▲1	▲1
Popular vote	15,354	13,452	11,906
Percentage	29.4%	25.7%	22.8%
Swing	▼3.5%	▲3.7%	▼0.9%
	Fourth party	Fifth party
Party	Independent	BNP
Seats won	2	1
Seats after	3	2
Seat change	Steady	▼1
Popular vote	4,946	5,162
Percentage	9.5%	9.9%
Swing	▲1.0%	▲0.1%
- 2006 local election results in Calderdale. Labour in red, Conservatives in blue, Liberal Democrats in yellow, Independent in grey and BNP in dark blue.
Council control before election
No overall control
Council control after election
No overall control

Elections to Calderdale Metropolitan Borough Council were held on 4 May 2006. One third of the council was up for election and the council stayed under no overall control with a minority Conservative administration.

17 of the 51 seats were up for re-election. Although these are the results after the election, the number of seats per party changed later that year. Councillor Paul Rogan was returned by the Rastrick ward in this election for four years as a Conservative councillor and is included in the twenty Conservative seats shown below. However, after the 2006 election, he left the party and joined the English Democrats Party. Also this year, Councillor Nicholas Yates, who had been returned by the Brighouse ward in the 2004 election for four years and is included in the twenty Conservative seats shown below, left the party to continue his tenure as an Independent. This left the Conservatives with 18 seats, 1 held by the English Democrats and 4 held by Independents. In December 2006, Illingworth and Mixenden ward Councillor Tom McElroy (Labour) died suddenly, leaving Labour with nine seats. The by-election to succeed him took place on 22 February 2007, with Labour holding the ward.

== Council results ==
Percentage change calculated compared to the previous election's results

2006 Calderdale Metropolitan Borough Council election
Party	Candidates						Votes		
Party	Stood	Elected	Gained	Unseated	Net	% of total	%	No.	Net %
Conservative	17	6	1	2	▼1	33.3	29.4	15,354	▼3.5
Liberal Democrats	18	5	1	0	▲1	27.8	25.7	13,452	▲3.7
Labour	18	4	1	0	▲1	22.2	22.8	11,906	▼0.9
BNP	8	1	0	1	▼1	5.6	9.9	5,162	▲0.1
Independent	8	2	1	1	Steady	11.1	9.5	4,946	▲1.0
Green	3	0	0	0	Steady	0.0	2.6	1,351	▲0.4
CPA	1	0	0	0	Steady	0.0	0.2	103	▲0.2

== Council composition ==
Prior to the election the composition of the council was:

↓
21	15	9	3	3
Conservative	Lib Dem	Labour	Ind	BN

After the election the composition of the council was:

↓
20	16	10	3	2
Conservative	Lib Dem	Labour	Ind	BN

Party	Previous council	New council
Conservative	21	20
Liberal Democrats	15	16
Labour	9	10
Independent	3	3
BNP	3	2
Total	51	51

== Ward results ==
Percentage change calculated compared to the last time these party candidates stood for election in 2004.

=== Brighouse ward ===
Brighouse ward
Party	Candidate	Votes	%	±%
Independent	Colin Stout	1,450	44.5	+2.2
Conservative	Alan Robert Taylor	978	30.0	−2.7
Labour	Daniel Alan Coll	575	17.6	−6.6
Liberal Democrats	Luke William Wickham	257	7.9	−1.3
Majority		472	14.4	−
Turnout		3,277	39.89	−10.6
Independent hold		Swing		

The incumbent was Colin Stout as an Independent.

=== Calder ward ===
Calder ward
Party	Candidate	Votes	%	±%
Liberal Democrats	Nader Fekri	1,222	34.1	+2.5
Labour	Stewart Brown	884	24.6	−1.4
Green	Paul Edward John Palmer	780	21.7	−4.9
Conservative	Annette Jean Getty	702	19.6	−3.8
Majority		338	9.3	−
Turnout		3,626	41.55	−11.3
Liberal Democrats hold		Swing		

The incumbent was Nader Fekri for the Liberal Democrats.

=== Elland ward ===
Elland ward
Party	Candidate	Votes	%	±%
Liberal Democrats	Robert Francis Thompson	1,390	53.7	+18.1
Conservative	Michael John Clarke	794	30.7	−5.7
Labour	Marion Simone Batten	405	15.6	+0.3
Majority		596	22.7	−
Turnout		2,629	33.56	−7.9
Liberal Democrats gain from Conservative		Swing		

The incumbent was Michael Clarke for the Conservative Party.

=== Greetland and Stainland ward ===
Greetland and Stainland ward
Party	Candidate	Votes	%	±%
Liberal Democrats	Conrad Vero Winterburn	1,401	51.3	+4.6
Conservative	Bryce Christian Corkish	768	28.1	+0.7
Labour	Nigel Patrick Ambler	336	12.3	−1.4
Green	Mark Richard Mullany	228	8.3	−3.3
Majority		633	23.0	−
Turnout		2,752	33.92	−11.9
Liberal Democrats hold		Swing		

The incumbent was Elizabeth Ingleton for the Liberal Democrats.

=== Hipperholme and Lightcliffe ward ===
Hipperholme and Lightcliffe ward
Party	Candidate	Votes	%	±%
Independent	Colin Raistrick	1,277	39.6	+3.2
Conservative	John Foran	1,215	37.7	−3.4
Labour	Keith John Butterick	500	15.5	−8.2
Liberal Democrats	Malcolm Graham James	233	7.2	−1.2
Majority		62	1.9	−
Turnout		3,235	39.74	−11.9
Independent gain from Conservative		Swing		

The incumbent was John Foran for the Conservative Party.

=== Illingworth and Mixenden ward ===
Illingworth and Mixenden ward
Party	Candidate	Votes	%	±%
BNP	Geoffrey James Wallace	1,075	35.6	+4.6
Labour	Janet Lynne Oosthuysen	840	27.8	−2.8
Conservative	Richard Francis Maycock	682	22.6	−0.7
Liberal Democrats	Michael Murray Elder	296	9.8	−0.9
Independent	Sean Vincent Loftus	124	4.1	+4.1
Majority		235	7.8	−
Turnout		3,022	36.14	−10.1
BNP hold		Swing		

The incumbent was Geoffrey Wallace for the BNP.

=== Luddendenfoot ward ===
Luddendenfoot ward
Party	Candidate	Votes	%	±%
Liberal Democrats	Peter Sephton Coles	1,082	34.9	−1.0
Conservative	Richard Hugh Marshall	936	30.2	−2.4
BNP	John Derek Gregory	570	18.4	+0.1
Labour	Graham William Rusher	515	16.6	−3.0
Majority		146	4.7	−
Turnout		3,119	42.33	−10.3
Liberal Democrats hold		Swing		

The incumbent was Peter Coles for the Liberal Democrats.

=== Northowram and Shelf ward ===
Northowram and Shelf ward
Party	Candidate	Votes	%	±%
Conservative	Stephen Baines	1,610	44.8	−5.4
BNP	Christopher Godridge	830	23.1	−0.4
Labour	Gary Rae	764	21.3	+3.7
Liberal Democrats	John Christopher Beacroft-Mitchell	387	10.8	−0.2
Majority		780	21.68	−
Turnout		3,598	41.56	−8.3
Conservative hold		Swing		

The incumbent was Stephen Baines for the Conservative Party.

=== Ovenden ward ===
Ovenden ward
Party	Candidate	Votes	%	±%
Labour	Helen Josephine Rivron	945	39.8	+1.5
Labour	Danielle Sara Eleana Coombs	873	36.8	−3.9
BNP	Thomas Lee Bates	796	33.6	+3.4
BNP	Jane Ann Shooter	775	32.7	+3.7
Conservative	Sally Victoria McCartney	319	13.4	+0.1
Conservative	Kathleen Young	303	12.8	+6.1
Liberal Democrats	Beth Charlotte Gore	285	12.0	−0.4
Liberal Democrats	Robert Ward	209	8.8	−3.0
Majority		72	3.2	−
Turnout		2,372	30.64	−10.2
Labour hold		Swing		
Labour hold		Swing		

The incumbents were Helen Rivron and Linda Riordan for the Labour Party.

=== Park ward ===
Park ward
Party	Candidate	Votes	%	±%
Labour	Zafar Iqbal Din	1,339	35.6	−3.0
Liberal Democrats	Mohammed Ilyas	971	25.8	+8.9
Independent	Shakar Saghir	668	17.8	−13.2
Conservative	John Cecil David Hardy	510	13.6	−21.1
Independent	Stephen Pickles	273	7.3	+7.3
Majority		368	9.7	−
Turnout		3,782	45.65	−21.7
Labour hold		Swing		

The incumbent was Zafar Iqbal Din for the Labour Party.

=== Rastrick ward ===
Rastrick ward
Party	Candidate	Votes	%	±%
Conservative	Paul Graham Rogan	1,603	54.0	+14.4
Labour	Pamela Margaret Fellows	822	27.7	−2.2
Liberal Democrats	Diane Park	542	18.3	−0.4
Majority		781	26.1	−
Turnout		2,988	36.02	−9.0
Conservative hold		Swing		

The incumbent was Paul Rogan for the Conservative Party.

=== Ryburn ward ===
Ryburn ward
Party	Candidate	Votes	%	±%
Conservative	Kay Barret	1,338	46.7	+8.7
Liberal Democrats	Ashley John Richard Evans	782	27.3	+1.5
Labour	Judith Mary Gannon	744	26.0	−1.6
Majority		556	19.20	−
Turnout		2,896	35.59	−11.9
Conservative hold		Swing		

The incumbent was Kay Barret for the Conservative Party.

=== Skircoat ward ===
Skircoat ward
Party	Candidate	Votes	%	±%
Conservative	Grenville Horsfall	1,419	40.5	−2.6
Liberal Democrats	Stephen Alexander Gow	1,410	40.3	+18.1
Green	Vivienne Patricia Smith	343	9.8	+9.8
Labour	Mohammed Ilyas Najib	330	9.4	−9.7
Majority		9	0.3	−
Turnout		3,534	39.13	−12.9
Conservative hold		Swing		

The incumbent was Grenville Horsfall for the Conservative Party.

=== Sowerby Bridge ward ===
Sowerby Bridge ward
Party	Candidate	Votes	%	±%
Conservative	Martin Peel	955	36.8	+4.8
Liberal Democrats	Anne Marsden	888	34.2	+13.5
Labour	David Draycott	754	29.0	+4.3
Majority		67	2.5	−
Turnout		2,647	33.78	−12.2
Conservative hold		Swing		

The incumbent was Robert Reynolds for the Conservative Party.

=== Todmorden ward ===
Todmorden ward
Party	Candidate	Votes	%	±%
Liberal Democrats	Ruth Goldthorpe	1,214	40.5	+2.0
Labour	Hariharan Padmanabhan	649	21.7	−6.1
BNP	Christian Michael Jackson	647	21.6	+21.6
Independent	Nicholas Green	485	16.2	+16.2
Majority		565	18.9	−
Turnout		2,995	36.05	−7.9
Liberal Democrats hold		Swing		

The incumbent was Ruth Goldthorpe for the Liberal Democrats.

=== Town ward ===
Town ward
Party	Candidate	Votes	%	±%
Labour	Robert George Metcalfe	1,151	40.7	+12.6
BNP	Stuart Brian Gill	748	26.4	−3.5
Conservative	Peter Byrne	590	20.9	−1.6
Liberal Democrats	John Boje Frederiksen	237	8.4	−2.2
CPA	Shaun Hogan	103	3.6	+3.6
Majority		403	14.2	−
Turnout		2,841	35.15	−10.5
Labour gain from BNP		Swing		

The incumbent was Adrian Marsden for the BNP.

=== Warley ward ===
Warley ward
Party	Candidate	Votes	%	±%
Conservative	David Ian Ginley	935	28.3	+6.3
Liberal Democrats	Brendan Robert Stubbs	855	25.8	+8.8
BNP	Michael Hall	496	15.0	−5.1
Independent	Jennifer Mary Carr	636	19.2	−7.8
Labour	Mohammed Shazad Fazal	353	10.7	+4.0
Independent	Kelly Marie Catlow	33	1.0	+1.0
Majority		80	2.4	−
Turnout		3,308	40.42	−11.3
Conservative gain from Independent		Swing		

The incumbent was Jennifer Carr as an Independent.

== By-elections between 2006 and 2007 ==
=== Illingworth and Mixenden ward, 2007 ===
Illingworth and Mixenden by-election, 22 February 2007
Party	Candidate	Votes	%	±%
Labour	Judith Mary Gannon	1,104	38.29	
BNP	Thomas Bates	1,034	35.86	
Conservative	John Cecil David Hardy	525	18.21	
Liberal Democrats	Michael Murray Elder	150	5.20	
Independent	Sean Vincent Loftus	68	2.35	
Majority		70	2.42	
Turnout		2,883	31.66	
Labour hold		Swing		
