= 2011 Barnsley Metropolitan Borough Council election =

2011 UK local government election

Map of the results of the 2011 Barnsley council election.

The 2011 Barnsley Metropolitan Borough Council election took place on 5 May 2011 to elect members of Barnsley Metropolitan Borough Council in South Yorkshire, England. One third of the council was up for election and the Labour Party stayed in overall control of the council.

After the election, the composition of the council was:

- Labour 43
- Barnsley Independent Group 13
- Conservative 6
- Independent 1

== Election result ==
The results saw Labour make 5 gains from the Barnsley Independent Group to have 43 councillors and a 23-vote majority. The Barnsley Independent Group dropped to 13 seats, while the Conservative Party stayed on 6 seats and there remained 1 other independent. Labour defeated sitting councillors for the Barnsley Independent Group in Hoyland Milton, Kingstone, Old Town and Rockingham wards. They also gained Darfield where the sitting councillor had stood down at the election, with the successful Labour candidate being a former Member of the European Parliament Brian Key. The Labour leader of the council, Steve Houghton, called on his party not to be complacent after their gains, while the leader of the Barnsley Independent Group called the results "a bitter blow".

Among other results, Jane Collins for the United Kingdom Independence Party, following her second place in the 2011 Barnsley Central by-election, came third in Monk Bretton ward. Meanwhile, the British National Party, after putting up 19 candidates, failed to come close to taking any seats. Overall turnout in the election was 36.3%.

Councillors elected in 2007 ended their term in 2011. The change in vote shares in compared to this corresponding election.

Barnsley local election result 2011
Party	Seats	Gains	Losses	Net gain/loss	Seats %	Votes %	Votes	+/−
Labour	17	5	0	+5	81.0	53.3	34,187	+9.1
Barnsley Ind.	2	0	5	-5	9.5	20.4	13,077	+0.9
Conservative	2	0	0	0	9.5	15.3	9,810	-1.8
BNP	0	0	0	0	0.0	7.2	4,645	-5.0
UKIP	0	0	0	0	0.0	1.4	902	+1.4
Independent	0	0	0	0	0.0	1.1	680	+0.3
English Democrat	0	0	0	0	0.0	0.5	290	+0.5
Liberal Democrats	0	0	0	0	0.0	0.4	265	-5.7
Socialist Labour	0	0	0	0	0.0	0.3	188	+0.3
TUSC	0	0	0	0	0.0	0.2	150	+0.2

== Ward results ==
Changes in vote are calculated from the corresponding elections in 2007.

Central
Party	Candidate	Votes	%	±%
Labour	Martin Dyson	1,577	61.6	+18.4
BNP	Colin Porter	289	11.3	−14.5
Conservative	Elizabeth Hill	281	11.0	+2.5
Barnsley Ind.	Damion Krska	263	10.3	−12.2
TUSC	Jack Hetherington	150	5.9	N/A
Majority		1,288	50.3	+19.0
Turnout		2,560	32.2	−11.3
Labour hold		Swing		

Cudworth
Party	Candidate	Votes	%	±%
Labour	Charlie Wraith	2,002	73.5	−1.0
BNP	Terry Hubbard	444	16.3	N/A
Conservative	Kirk Dyson	278	10.2	−15.3
Majority		1,558	57.2	+17.0
Turnout		2,724	33.7	−22.2
Labour hold		Swing		

Darfield
Party	Candidate	Votes	%	±%
Labour	Brian Key	1,541	50.2	+21.1
Barnsley Ind.	Carmen Hancock-Jones	1,091	35.6	−9.3
Conservative	Gordon Wilkinson	239	7.8	+1.2
BNP	David Burnett	197	6.4	−7.0
Majority		450	14.7	+2.3
Turnout		3,068	38.2	−18.4
Labour gain from Barnsley Ind.		Swing		

Darton East
Party	Candidate	Votes	%	±%
Labour	Roy Miller	1,660	51.8	+11.8
Barnsley Ind.	John Race	894	27.9	+10.1
Conservative	Garry Needham	363	11.3	−2.2
BNP	Sharon Sutton	170	5.3	−11.9
Liberal Democrats	Joni Hood	117	3.7	N/A
Majority		766	23.9	
Turnout		3,204	38.1	−22.8
Labour hold		Swing		

Darton West
Party	Candidate	Votes	%	±%
Labour	Linda Burgess	2,041	62.9	+19.9
Conservative	Clive Watkinson	769	23.7	+11.7
BNP	Ian Sutton	435	13.4	−13.6
Majority		1,272	39.2	+16.2
Turnout		3,245	39.3	−25.6
Labour hold		Swing		

Dearne North
Party	Candidate	Votes	%	±%
Labour	Alan Gardiner	1,665	69.0	+22.1
Barnsley Ind.	Kurt Garner	501	20.8	+16.1
BNP	Nathan Walker	246	10.2	−11.4
Majority		1,164	48.3	+6.1
Turnout		2,412	29.8	−18.4
Labour hold		Swing		

Dearne South
Party	Candidate	Votes	%	±%
Labour	Ralph Sixsmith	2,183	76.2	+30.3
BNP	Raymond Hinchliffe	270	9.4	−13.2
Conservative	Paul Buckley	207	7.2	+2.4
Barnsley Ind.	Susan Garner	206	7.2	N/A
Majority		1,913	66.7	+45.0
Turnout		2,866	32.3	−21.8
Labour hold		Swing		

Dodworth
Party	Candidate	Votes	%	±%
Barnsley Ind.	Brian Perrin	1,564	45.0	+7.1
Labour	Dave Leech	1,199	34.5	+6.4
Conservative	Hamish Toon	494	14.2	−0.2
BNP	Alan Brown	222	6.4	−6.7
Majority		365	10.5	+9.0
Turnout		3,479	44.2	−22.1
Barnsley Ind. hold		Swing		

Hoyland Milton
Party	Candidate	Votes	%	±%
Labour	Tim Shepherd	1,630	49.3	+5.9
Barnsley Ind.	Barry Lipscombe	1,075	32.5	+14.6
Conservative	Sam England	314	9.5	+0.0
English Democrat	Kevin Riddiough	290	8.8	N/A
Majority		555	16.8	−5.2
Turnout		3,309	36.2	−10.5
Labour gain from Barnsley Ind.		Swing		

Kingstone
Party	Candidate	Votes	%	±%
Labour	Tom Sheard	1,160	48.0	+5.0
Barnsley Ind.	Geoff Bowden	870	36.0	+2.5
BNP	Peter Robinson	195	8.1	−4.8
Conservative	Howard Pearson	193	8.0	−2.6
Majority		290	12.0	+2.5
Turnout		2,418	31.1	−20.7
Labour gain from Barnsley Ind.		Swing		

Monk Bretton
Party	Candidate	Votes	%	±%
Labour	Margaret Sheard	1,292	48.0	+4.7
Barnsley Ind.	Clive Pickering	560	20.8	−8.3
UKIP	Jane Collins	452	16.8	N/A
BNP	Jane Hubbard	252	9.4	−7.7
Conservative	Michael Toon	135	5.0	−5.5
Majority		732	27.2	+13.0
Turnout		2,691	32.7	
Labour hold		Swing		

North East
Party	Candidate	Votes	%	±%
Barnsley Ind.	Dave North	1,716	46.8	+3.2
Labour	Chris Sykes	1,388	37.9	−0.5
Conservative	Gill Millner	231	6.3	+0.6
BNP	Winnifred Dashwood	210	5.7	−1.0
Independent	Tony Devoy	122	3.3	N/A
Majority		328	8.9	
Turnout		3,667	37.2	
Barnsley Ind. hold		Swing		

Old Town
Party	Candidate	Votes	%	±%
Labour	Anita Cherryholme	1,673	52.8	+31.1
Barnsley Ind.	John Love	951	30.0	+1.9
Conservative	Andrew Barr	331	10.5	+1.9
BNP	John Curtis	211	6.7	−7.4
Majority		722	22.8	
Turnout		3,166	37.5	
Labour gain from Barnsley Ind.		Swing		

Penistone East
Party	Candidate	Votes	%	±%
Conservative	Paul Hand-Davis	2,577	58.7	+9.7
Labour	Jill Hayler	1,811	41.3	+17.6
Majority		766	17.5	
Turnout		4,388	48.2	
Conservative hold		Swing		

Penistone West
Party	Candidate	Votes	%	±%
Conservative	Ann Rusby	1,836	47.2	+6.2
Labour	Peter Starling	1,298	33.4	+17.5
Independent	Mick Drewry	558	14.4	N/A
BNP	Paul James	195	5.0	−3.6
Majority		538	13.8	−1.4
Turnout		3,887	43.5	−22.7
Conservative hold		Swing		

Rockingham
Party	Candidate	Votes	%	±%
Labour	Chris Lamb	1,846	50.5	+7.9
Barnsley Ind.	Steven Sylvester	1,263	34.6	−11.0
Conservative	George Hill	333	9.1	−2.7
BNP	Peter Shirt	210	5.8	N/A
Majority		583	16.0	−3.8
Turnout		3,652	42.2	−18.6
Labour gain from Barnsley Ind.		Swing		

Royston
Party	Candidate	Votes	%	±%
Labour	Tracy Cheetham	1,570	59.5	+14.8
UKIP	James Johnson	450	17.1	N/A
Conservative	Alex Wilkinson	244	9.2	+0.6
Liberal Democrats	Ben Wilson	148	5.6	−15.7
Socialist Labour	Eddie Gouthwaite	114	4.3	N/A
BNP	Paul Harris	113	4.3	−9.0
Majority		1,120	42.4	+19.2
Turnout		2,639	31.9	−24.5
Labour hold		Swing		

St. Helens
Party	Candidate	Votes	%	±%
Labour	Jenny Platts	1,713	79.3	+21.7
BNP	Dean Walker	261	12.1	−4.5
Conservative	Lesley Watkinson	185	8.6	+1.5
Majority		1,452	67.3	+14.1
Turnout		2,159	28.1	−19.8
Labour hold		Swing		

Stairfoot
Party	Candidate	Votes	%	±%
Labour	Karen Dyson	1,755	61.1	+19.6
Barnsley Ind.	Daniel Pickering	622	21.7	−6.4
BNP	Susan Harris	261	9.1	−5.7
Conservative	Chris Pilkington	233	8.1	+3.0
Majority		1,133	39.5	+24.8
Turnout		2,871	34.1	−18.5
Labour hold		Swing		

Wombwell
Party	Candidate	Votes	%	±%
Labour	Dick Wraith	1,887	65.8	+6.6
Barnsley Ind.	Jane Townsend	440	15.3	+0.6
Conservative	Keith Jenner	323	11.3	−0.3
BNP	Shane Parker	218	7.6	−6.9
Majority		1,447	50.5	+9.7
Turnout		2,868	33.3	−19.2
Labour hold		Swing		

Worsbrough
Party	Candidate	Votes	%	±%
Labour	Betty Barlow	1,296	44.4	+9.2
Barnsley Ind.	Raymond Levitt	1,061	36.3	+4.7
BNP	Daniel Cooke	246	8.4	−9.0
Conservative	Peter Murray	244	8.4	+2.9
Socialist Labour	Terry Robinson	74	2.5	N/A
Majority		235	8.0	−11.9
Turnout		2,921	38.7	−18.3
Labour hold		Swing		

== By-elections between 2011 and 2012 ==
St Helen's By-Election 13 October 2011
Party	Candidate	Votes	%	±%
Labour	Dave Leech	1,257	75.8	−3.6
BNP	Danny Cooke	174	10.5	−1.6
English Democrat	Kevin Riddiough	146	8.8	+8.8
Conservative	Clive Watkinson	61	3.7	−4.9
Independent	Edward Gouthwaite	21	1.3	+1.3
Majority		1,083	65.3	−2.0
Turnout		1,659	20.5	−7.6
Labour hold		Swing	-1.0	
