= 2003 Calderdale Metropolitan Borough Council election =

2003 UK local government election

- 1 May 2003

17 of 51 seats on Calderdale Metropolitan Borough Council 26 seats needed for a majority

	First party	Second party	Third party
Party	Conservative	Liberal Democrats	Labour
Seats won	9	7	3
Seats after	25	16	10
Seat change		▲1
Leader before election
Conservative
Leader after election
Conservative

Elections to Calderdale Metropolitan Borough Council were held on 1 May 2003. One third of the council was up for election and the council stayed under no overall control. The total turnout of the election was 34.44% (47,601 voters of an electorate of 138,228). The winning candidate(s) in each ward is highlighted in bold.

== Ward results ==
=== Brighouse ward ===
Brighouse ward
Party	Candidate	Votes	%	±%
Conservative	**Craig Whittaker**	885	36.90	
Labour Co-op	George Edward Richardson	760	31.69	
Independent	Dorothy Helen Anderson	540	22.51	
Liberal Democrats	Glen Michael Mattock	213	8.88	
Majority		125		
Turnout		2,398	32.55	
Conservative **gain** from Independent		Swing		

=== Calder Valley ward ===
Calder Valley ward
Party	Candidate	Votes	%	±%
Liberal Democrats	**Michael Francis Taylor**	1,113	38.18	
Labour	Stewart Brown	749	25.69	
Green	Jamie Johnson	541	18.55	
Conservative	Darren Keith Midgley	512	17.56	
Majority		364		
Turnout		2,915	33.17	
Liberal Democrats **hold**		Swing		

=== Elland ward ===
Elland ward
Party	Candidate	Votes	%	±%
Liberal Democrats	**Diane Park**	1,194	57.84	
Labour	Stanley Richard Sutcliffe	469	22.72	
Conservative	Michael John Clarke	401	19.42	
Majority		364		
Turnout		2,064	27.41	
Liberal Democrats **hold**		Swing		

=== Greetland and Stainland ward ===
Greetland and Stainland ward
Party	Candidate	Votes	%	±%
Liberal Democrats	**Elizabeth Margaret Drake Ingleton**	1,769	63.31	
Conservative	Bryce Christian Corkish	662	23.69	
Labour	Nigel Patrick Ambler	363	12.99	
Majority		1,107		
Turnout		2,794	30.38	
Liberal Democrats **hold**		Swing		

=== Hipperholme and Lightcliffe ward ===
Hipperholme and Lightcliffe ward
Party	Candidate	Votes	%	±%
Conservative	**Graham Thomas Hall**	1,390	51.63	
Independent	Adrian Christopher O'Connor	769	28.56	
Labour	Keith John Butterick	533	19.79	
Majority		621		
Turnout		2,692	34.59	
Conservative **hold**		Swing		

=== Illingworth ward ===
Illingworth ward
Party	Candidate	Votes	%	±%
BNP	**Richard Mulhall**	896	38.68	
Labour	Zoë Marston	840	36.26	
Conservative	Richard Francis Maycock	580	25.04	
Majority		56		
Turnout		2,316	36.48	
BNP **gain** from Labour		Swing		

=== Luddendenfoot ward ===
Luddendenfoot ward
Party	Candidate	Votes	%	±%
Liberal Democrats	**Christine Irene Bampton-Smith**	1,277	46.53	
Labour	Susan Mary Press	577	21.02	
Conservative	Annette Jean Getty	548	19.97	
Green	Steven Richard Hutton	342	12.46	
Majority		700		
Turnout		2,744	33.49	
Liberal Democrats **hold**		Swing		

=== Mixenden ward ===
Mixenden ward
Party	Candidate	Votes	%	±%
Liberal Democrats	**Stephen John Pearson**	986	39.37	
BNP	Jane Ann Shooter	700	27.95	
Labour	Robert George Metcalfe	682	27.23	
Conservative	John Joseph Wainwright	136	5.43	
Majority		286		
Turnout		2,504	39.52	
Liberal Democrats **gain** from Labour		Swing		

=== Northowram and Shelf ward ===
Northowram and Shelf ward
Party	Candidate	Votes	%	±%
Conservative	**William Charles Albert Carpenter**	1,231	36.33	
BNP	Graham Nalton	1,119	33.02	
Labour	Derek Fox Haviour	525	15.49	
Independent	John Christopher Pulman	270	7.96	
Liberal Democrats	Janet Mary Sherrard-Smith	243	7.17	
Majority		112		
Turnout		3,388	40.21	
Conservative **hold**		Swing		

=== Ovenden ward ===
Ovenden ward
Party	Candidate	Votes	%	±%
Labour	**Linda June Riordan**	837	39.68	
BNP	Andrew Mellor	618	29.30	
Liberal Democrats	Pamela Elizabeth Burton	512	24.27	
Conservative	Joan Elizabeth Wainwright	142	6.73	
Majority		219		
Turnout		2,109	32.75	
Labour **hold**		Swing		

=== Rastrick ward ===
Rastrick ward
Party	Candidate	Votes	%	±%
Conservative	**John Clarence Williamson**	1,052	50.55	
Labour	Pamela Margaret Fellows	598	28.73	
Liberal Democrats	John Durkin	431	20.71	
Majority		454		
Turnout		2,081	27.14	
Conservative **hold**		Swing		

=== Ryburn ward ===
Ryburn ward
Party	Candidate	Votes	%	±%
Conservative	**Raynor Wilson Booth**	1,069	38.78	
Labour	Judith Mary Gannon	861	31.24	
Liberal Democrats	Anthony Crowther	826	29.97	
Majority		208		
Turnout		2,756	31.1	
Conservative **hold**		Swing		

=== Skircoat ward ===
Skircoat ward
Party	Candidate	Votes	%	±%
Conservative	**Grenville Horsfall**	1,404	53.40	
Labour	Maura Wilson	681	25.90	
Liberal Democrats	Mark Ian Scholes	544	20.69	
Majority		723		
Turnout		2,629	31.65	
Conservative **hold**		Swing		

=== Sowerby Bridge ward ===
Sowerby Bridge ward
Party	Candidate	Votes	%	±%
Conservative	**Amanda Louise Byrne**	871		
Conservative	**Andrew David Feather**	862		
Labour	Michael George Marsden	774		
BNP	John Derek Gregory	711		
Labour	Michael Donald Higgins	670		
BNP	Christian Michael Jackson	600		
Liberal Democrats	Paul Stevenson	411		
Liberal Democrats	Siobhen Stow	396		
Turnout			38.84	
Conservative **hold**		Swing		

=== St John's ward ===
St John's ward
Party	Candidate	Votes	%	±%
Labour	**Mohammed Najib**	1,480	42.21	
Conservative	Shakar Saghir	980	27.95	
Liberal Democrats	John Christopher Beacroft-Mitchell	566	16.14	
BNP	Andrew Mulligan	480	13.69	
Majority		500		
Turnout		3,506	48.27	
Labour **hold**		Swing		

=== Todmorden ward ===
Todmorden ward
Party	Candidate	Votes	%	±%
Liberal Democrats	**Hilary Alice Myers**	1,155	52.64	
Labour	Frank Rostron McManus	729	33.22	
Conservative	Thiruvenkatar Krishnapillai	310	14.12	
Majority		426		
Turnout		2,194	30.2	
Liberal Democrats **hold**		Swing		

=== Town ward ===
Town ward
Party	Candidate	Votes	%	±%
Labour	**Timothy John Swift**	1,148	37.03	
Conservative	Stephen Baines	833	26.87	
BNP	Christopher Godridge	782	25.22	
Liberal Democrats	Elisabeth Mary Wilson	337	10.87	
Majority		315		
Turnout		3,100	39.03	
Labour **gain** from Conservative		Swing		

=== Warley ward ===
Warley ward
Party	Candidate	Votes	%	±%
Conservative	**John Cecil David Hardy**	1,521	58.47	
Labour	Catherine Mary Groves	599	23.02	
Liberal Democrats	Josef Arthur Rez	481	18.49	
Majority		922		
Turnout		2,601	35.73	
Conservative **hold**		Swing		

== By-elections between 2003 and 2004 ==
=== Mixenden ward, 2003 ===
Mixenden By-Election 16 October 2003
Party	Candidate	Votes	%	±%
**Liberal Democrats**	**Jennifer Pearson**	**1,210**	**47.6**	**+8.2**
BNP	Heath Clegg	801	31.5	+3.5
Labour	Daniel Coll	474	18.7	−8.5
Independent	Sean Loftus	56	2.2	+2.2
Majority		409	16.1	
Turnout		2,541	40.2	
Liberal Democrats **hold**		Swing		
