= 2011 Doncaster Metropolitan Borough Council election =

2011 local election in England

← 2010	5 May 2011	2012 →

One third (21 of 63) seats to Doncaster Metropolitan Borough Council 32 seats needed for a majority
	First party	Second party	Third party
Party	Labour	Conservative	Liberal Democrats
Seats won	17	3	1
Seat change	▲7	0	▼4
Popular vote	37,921	15,750	5,723
Percentage	46.2%	19.2%	7%
Swing	▲13%	0%	▼10.2%
- Map showing the results of the 2011 Doncaster Council elections.
Council control before election
Labour
Council control after election
Labour

The 2011 Doncaster Metropolitan Borough Council election took place on 5 May 2011 to elect one third of Doncaster Metropolitan Borough Council as part of the 2011 local elections in the United Kingdom.

The election resulted in the Labour Party retaining its control of the council, increasing its majority by seven seats. The Liberal Democrats lost four of the five seats it was defending, all of which were gained by Labour. After the election, the composition of the council was:

- Labour 43
- Conservative 9
- Liberal Democrats 6
- Others 5

== Results summary ==
Doncaster Metropolitan Borough Council election, 2011
Party	Seats	Gains	Losses	Net gain/loss	Seats %	Votes %	Votes	+/−
Labour	17	7	0	+7		46.2	37,921	
Conservative	3	0	0	0		19.2	15,750	
Liberal Democrats	1	0	4	-4		7	5,723	
Independent	0	0	2	-2		12.3	10,105	
English Democrat	0	0	0	0		9.4	7,703	
Community Group	0	0	1	-1		2.1	1,686	
BNP	0	0	0	0		1.6	1,302	
UKIP	0	0	0	0		1	847	
Green	0	0	0	0		1	794	
TUSC	0	0	0	0		0.3	268	

== Ward results ==
The results in each ward are shown below. Changes are compared with the previous election in 2007.

=== Adwick ===
Adwick
Party	Candidate	Votes	%	±%
Labour	Susan Mary Bolton	2,326	68.1	+8.5
Conservative	Kerry Nigel Wood	509	14.9	N/A
English Democrat	Vivien Woodrow	323	9.5	N/A
Liberal Democrats	Dave Farrell	259	7.6	−32.8
Turnout		3,417	32	+4.4
Labour hold		Swing		

=== Armthorpe ===
Armthorpe
Party	Candidate	Votes	%	±%
Labour	Tony Corden	1,958	51.8	+16.7
Independent	Scott Andrew Pickles	1,410	37.3	N/A
Conservative	Barbara Fletcher	412	11	N/A
Turnout		3,783	34.2	+3.1
Labour gain from Independent		Swing		

=== Askern Spa ===
Askern Spa
Party	Candidate	Votes	%	±%
Labour	Alan Jones	2,205	54.8	+10.3
Conservative	Carol Greenhalgh	831	20.6	−13.8
English Democrat	Malcolm Woodrow	574	14.3	N/A
Independent	John Hardy	416	10.3	N/A
Turnout		4,026	40.9	+6.9
Labour hold		Swing		

=== Balby ===
Balby
Party	Candidate	Votes	%	±%
Labour	Mick Jameson	2,105	56.9	+18
Independent	Margaret Thompson	925	25	N/A
Conservative	Liz Sparrow	669	18.1	+6.4
Turnout		3,699	32.6	+0.9
Labour hold		Swing		

=== Bentley ===
Bentley
Party	Candidate	Votes	%	±%
Labour	Charlie Hogarth	1,937	61	+10.5
English Democrat	Tony Wagstaffe	739	23.3	N/A
Independent	Phil Mason	498	15.7	N/A
Turnout		3,174	31.9	−0.4
Labour hold		Swing		

=== Bessacarr & Cantley ===
Bessacarr & Cantley
Party	Candidate	Votes	%	±%
Liberal Democrats	Paul Coddington	1,614	34	−18.9
Labour	Paul Bissett	1,371	28.9	+10.3
Conservative	Martin Greenhalgh	1,006	21.2	+1.6
English Democrat	Keith Hewitt	756	15.9	N/A
Turnout		4,747	42	+2.6
Liberal Democrats hold		Swing		

=== Central ===
Central
Party	Candidate	Votes	%	±%
Labour	Sue Wilkinson	1,914	55.5	+12.5
Conservative	Paul Hutchinson	504	14.6	−1.2
Community Group	Stuart Exelby	402	11.7	N/A
Liberal Democrats	Barbara Jean Bell	358	10.4	−20.5
TUSC	Mal Perkins	268	7.8	N/A
Turnout		3,446	30.4	−0.2
Labour hold		Swing		

=== Conisbrough & Denaby ===
Conisbrough & Denaby
Party	Candidate	Votes	%	±%
Labour	Craig Sahman	2,417	70.4	+24.1
BNP	Erwin Toseland	596	17.4	N/A
Conservative	Jonathan Sherwin Broughton	422	12.3	N/A
Turnout		3,435	32.8	+0.1
Labour hold		Swing		

=== Edenthorpe, Kirk Sandall & Barnby Dun ===
Edenthorpe, Kirk Sandall & Barnby Dun
Party	Candidate	Votes	%	±%
Labour	Tony Revill	1,618	36.5	+12.5
Independent	Michael Thomas Maye	928	20.9	N/A
Conservative	Nick Allen	837	18.9	+4.2
English Democrat	Fred Gee	655	14.8	N/A
Liberal Democrats	Karl Goodman	394	8.9	−29.3
Turnout		4,432	41.5	+4.8
Labour gain from Liberal Democrats		Swing		

=== Edlington & Warmsworth ===
Edlington & Warmsworth
Party	Candidate	Votes	%	±%
Labour	Bob Johnson	1,856	48	+7.6
Independent	Georgina Mullis	1,053	27.2	−14.8
English Democrat	John Brennan	512	13.2	N/A
Conservative	Elizabeth Jones	292	7.6	−3.7
BNP	Helen Ellis	153	4	N/A
Turnout		3,866	36.9	+4.1
Labour gain from Independent		Swing		

=== Finningley ===
Finningley
Party	Candidate	Votes	%	±%
Conservative	Patricia Schofield	2,217	41.4	−1.5
Labour	Francis John Jackson	1,327	24.8	+10.5
English Democrat	Nigel Berry	1,137	21.2	−2.6
Liberal Democrats	Richard Alan Johnson	670	12.5	−2.2
Turnout		5,351	44.4	+3.6
Conservative hold		Swing		

=== Great North Road ===
Great North Road
Party	Candidate	Votes	%	±%
Labour	Bill Mordue	2,195	48.4	+12.3
Independent	David Hughes	893	19.7	N/A
Conservative	Frank Lloyd Calladine	551	12.1	−4.2
English Democrat	Steve Grocott	492	10.8	N/A
Green	Stephen Platt	245	5.4	−8.5
Liberal Democrats	John Victor Butterfield	161	3.5	N/A
Turnout		4,537	38.6	+4.5
Labour hold		Swing		

=== Hatfield ===
Hatfield
Party	Candidate	Votes	%	±%
Labour	Pat Knight	1,519	39.5	+0.3
English Democrat	Mick Glynn	673	17.5	N/A
Independent	Jessie Jamieson Credland	604	15.7	N/A
Conservative	James Vincent Hart	556	14.4	−9
Community Group	Stewart Rayner	329	8.5	−28.9
Independent	Peter Knight	169	4.4	N/A
Turnout		3,850	38	+4
Labour hold		Swing		

=== Mexborough ===
Mexborough
Party	Candidate	Votes	%	±%
Labour	Sue Phillips	2,116	56.1	20.5
Liberal Democrats	Malcolm Jevons	924	24.5	−33.3
BNP	John Alfred Bettney	265	7	N/A
UKIP	Anthony Mark Watson	255	6.8	N/A
Conservative	Phyllis Calladine	211	5.6	−1
Turnout		3,771	32.8	+1.6
Labour gain from Liberal Democrats		Swing		

=== Rossington ===
Rossington
Party	Candidate	Votes	%	±%
Labour	Hilary McNamee	1,498	42.7	+8.7
Independent	Terry Wilde	921	26.3	+2.3
Independent	John Nolan Cooke	656	18.7	N/A
Conservative	Kathleen Margaret Beard	296	8.4	−2
Liberal Democrats	John Brown	134	3.8	N/A
Turnout		3,505	34.6	+3.3
Labour hold		Swing		

=== Sprotbrough ===
Sprotbrough
Party	Candidate	Votes	%	±%
Conservative	Cynthia Ransome	1,629	38.4	−5.8
Labour	Peter Alexander Edward Millar	1,398	33	+13.2
English Democrat	Barbara Hewitt	662	15.6	N/A
Green	Lynette Chipp	549	13	−10.4
Turnout		4,238	44	+2.5
Conservative hold		Swing		

=== Stainforth & Moorends ===
Stainforth & Moorends
Party	Candidate	Votes	%	±%
Labour	Joe Blackham	1,582	51	+12.1
Conservative	Martin Edward Drake	471	15.2	−1.7
English Democrat	Margaret Rose Holt-Taylor	394	12.7	N/A
BNP	Dave Owen	288	9.3	−11.7
Community Group	Allison Jane Wilson	232	7.5	−15.7
Independent	John Quinn	135	4.4	N/A
Turnout		3,102	31.5	+4.1
Labour hold		Swing		

=== Thorne ===
Thorne
Party	Candidate	Votes	%	±%
Labour	Rachel Hodson	1,696	42.1	+20.2
Conservative	John Brown	951	23.6	−0.7
Community Group	Tony Brookes	723	17.9	−14.1
Independent	Richard Walker	663	16.4	N/A
Turnout		4,033	37.7	+3.6
Labour gain from Community Group		Swing		

=== Torne Valley ===
Torne Valley
Party	Candidate	Votes	%	±%
Conservative	Barbara Mary Hoyle	2,255	49.4	−2.6
Labour	Ian Pearson	1,241	27.2	+10.9
UKIP	Rebecca Walters	592	13	+2.8
Liberal Democrats	David Adgar	473	10.4	−11.2
Turnout		4,561	45.5	+4.4
Conservative hold		Swing		

=== Town Moor ===
Town Moor
Party	Candidate	Votes	%	±%
Labour	Sue Knowles	1,775	48	−18.4
Conservative	Chris Allen	628	17	−0.3
Independent	Patrick Wilson	834	22.6	N/A
Liberal Democrats	Kim Doyle	460	12.4	−40.7
Turnout		3,697	36	+1.1
Labour gain from Liberal Democrats		Swing		

=== Wheatley ===
Wheatley
Party	Candidate	Votes	%	±%
Labour	John Sheppard	1,867	54.4	+19.5
English Democrat	Roy John Penketh	786	22.9	N/A
Conservative	Maurice Field	500	14.6	−2.5
Liberal Democrats	Michelle Goodman	276	8	−32.6
Turnout		3,429	34.4	+1.8
Labour gain from Liberal Democrats		Swing		
