= 2015 Barnsley Metropolitan Borough Council election =

2015 local election in England

- 7 May 2015

21 of 63 seats to Barnsley Metropolitan Borough Council 32 seats needed for a majority
| | First party | Second party | Third party |
|---|---|---|---|
| Party | Labour | Conservative | Barnsley Ind. |
| Seats won | 55 | 4 | 4 |
| Seat change | ▲2 | Steady | ▼2 |
| Popular vote | 53,833 | 18,344 | 5,956 |
| Percentage | 52.8% | 18.0% | 5.8% |
| Swing | ▲2.2% | ▲3.5% | ▼2.3% |
Council control before election
Labour Party (UK)
Council control after election
Labour Party (UK)

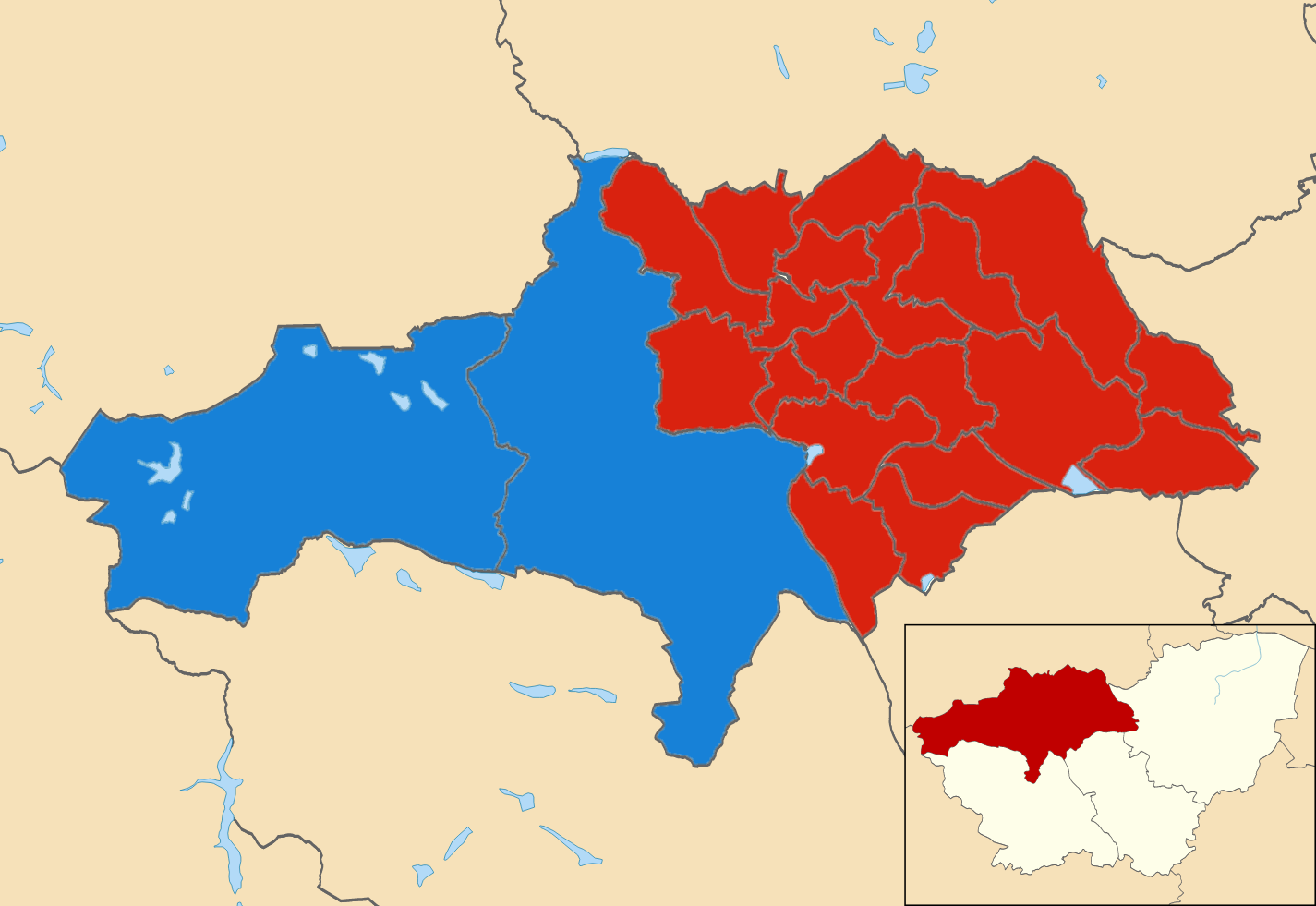
2015 local election results in Barnsley

The 2015 Barnsley Metropolitan Borough Council election took place on 7 May 2015 to elect members of Barnsley Metropolitan Borough Council in England as part of the 2015 United Kingdom local elections. Councillors retiring at this election were Cllrs. Betty Barlow (Worsborough); Tracey Cheetham (Royston); Brian Key (Darfield); and Tom Sheard (Kingstone) (all L); Dave North (North East) and Brian Perrin (Dodworth) from the Barnsley Independent Group; and Anne Rusby (Penistone West) (C).

== Results summary ==
Labour maintained control winning 19 of the 21 seats up for election. The Conservatives won the other 2 seats.

After the election the political make up of the council was:

| Year | Labour | Barnsley Independent Group | Conservative | Independent |
|---|---|---|---|---|
| 2015 | 55 | 4 | 4 | 0 |

== By-elections between 2015 and 2016 ==
Dearne North by-election 27 August 2015
| Party | Candidate | Votes | % | ±% |
|---|---|---|---|---|
| Labour | Annette Gollick | 817 | 69.8 | +4.2 |
| UKIP | Jim Johnson | 140 | 12.0 | −15.4 |
| Yorkshire First | Tony Devoy | 115 | 9.8 | +9.8 |
| TUSC | Karen Fletcher | 55 | 4.7 | +4.7 |
| Conservative | Lee Ogden | 43 | 3.7 | −3.3 |
| Majority | | 677 | 57.9 | |
| Turnout | | 1,170 | | |
| Labour hold | | Swing | | |
