= 2010 Doncaster Metropolitan Borough Council election =

2010 UK local government election

| ← 2008 | 6 May 2010 | 2011 → |

One third (21 of 63) seats to Doncaster Metropolitan Borough Council 32 seats needed for a majority
| | First party | Second party | Third party |
|---|---|---|---|
| Party | Labour | Conservative | Liberal Democrats |
| Seats won | 17 | 3 | 1 |
| Seat change | ▲8 | 0 | ▼2 |
| Popular vote | 45,467 | 25,590 | 19,022 |
| Percentage | 35.9% | 20.2% | 15.0% |
| Swing | ▲1.5% | ▼0.1% | ▼1.0% |
- Map showing the results of the 2010 Doncaster Council elections.
Council control before election
No overall control
Council control after election
Labour

The 2010 Doncaster Metropolitan Borough Council election took place on 6 May 2010 to elect one third of Doncaster Metropolitan Borough Council in South Yorkshire, England as part of the 2010 United Kingdom local elections. The 2010 General Election also took place on the same day.

The election resulted in the Labour Party taking control of the council from No overall control for the first time since 2003 after gaining eight seats overall. After the election, the composition of the council was:

- Labour 34
- Liberal Democrats 10
- Conservative 9
- Others 11

== Result summary ==
Doncaster Metropolitan Borough Council election, 2010
| Party | Seats | Gains | Losses | Net gain/loss | Seats % | Votes % | Votes | +/− |
|---|---|---|---|---|---|---|---|---|
| Labour | 17 | 8 | 0 | +8 | | 35.9 | 45,467 | |
| Conservative | 3 | 0 | 0 | 0 | | 20.2 | 25,590 | |
| Liberal Democrats | 1 | 0 | 2 | -2 | | 15.0 | 19,022 | |
| English Democrat | 0 | 0 | 0 | 0 | | 14.5 | 18,412 | |
| Independent | 0 | 0 | 4 | -4 | | 7.6 | 9,570 | |
| Community Group | 0 | 0 | 2 | -2 | | 2.2 | 2,809 | |
| BNP | 0 | 0 | 0 | 0 | | 2.2 | 2,756 | |
| Green | 0 | 0 | 0 | 0 | | 1.2 | 1,552 | |
| UKIP | 0 | 0 | 0 | 0 | | 1.2 | 1,501 | |

== Ward results ==
The results in each ward are shown below. Changes are compared with the previous election in 2006. Spoilt ballots are not included in the below results.

=== Adwick ===
Adwick
| Party | Candidate | Votes | % |
|---|---|---|---|
| Labour | John Mounsey | 2,948 | 51.99 |
| Liberal Democrats | Dave Farrell | 1,068 | 18.84 |
| English Democrat | Janine Clark | 1,004 | 17.71 |
| Conservative | Alan Smith | 650 | 11.46 |
| Turnout | | 5,670 | 52.83 |
| Labour hold | | | |

=== Armthorpe ===
Armthorpe
| Party | Candidate | Votes | % |
|---|---|---|---|
| Labour | Chris McGuinness | 2,369 | 39.20 |
| Independent | Tony Brown | 1,258 | 20.81 |
| Liberal Democrats | Robert Mitchell | 877 | 14.51 |
| Conservative | Malcom Andrew Knight | 848 | 14.03 |
| English Democrat | Lawrence Edward Parramore | 692 | 11.45 |
| Turnout | | 6,044 | 55.59 |
| Labour gain from Independent | | | |

=== Askern Spa ===
Askern Spa
| Party | Candidate | Votes | % |
|---|---|---|---|
| Labour | Ros Jones | 2,756 | 48.58 |
| Conservative | Martin Damian Greenhalgh | 1,502 | 26.48 |
| English Democrat | Malcolm Eric Woodrow | 1,415 | 24.94 |
| Turnout | | 5,673 | 59.51 |
| Labour hold | | | |

=== Balby ===
Balby
| Party | Candidate | Votes | % |
|---|---|---|---|
| Labour | Andrew Bosmans | 2,505 | 42.10 |
| Conservative | Matthew Peter Brunning | 1,462 | 24.57 |
| Independent | Garth Oxby | 1,289 | 21.66 |
| Independent | Margaret Yvonne Dorothy Thompson | 694 | 11.66 |
| Turnout | | 5,950 | 53.60 |
| Labour gain from Independent | | | |

=== Bentley ===
Bentley
| Party | Candidate | Votes | % |
|---|---|---|---|
| Labour | Stuart Hardy | 2,262 | 46.96 |
| English Democrat | Bernard Warner | 1,114 | 23.13 |
| Independent | Eddie Storey | 792 | 16.44 |
| Conservative | Brian Woodhouse | 649 | 13.47 |
| Turnout | | 4,817 | 49.64 |
| Labour hold | | | |

=== Bessacarr and Cantley ===
Bessacarr and Cantley
| Party | Candidate | Votes | % |
|---|---|---|---|
| Liberal Democrats | Eric Victor Tatton-Kelly | 2,496 | 34.83 |
| Conservative | Liz Sparrow | 1,895 | 26.44 |
| Labour | Sue Wilkinson | 1,626 | 22.69 |
| English Democrat | Mick Cooper | 1,149 | 16.03 |
| Turnout | | 7,166 | 64.12 |
| Liberal Democrats hold | | | |

=== Central ===
Central
| Party | Candidate | Votes | % |
|---|---|---|---|
| Labour | John McHale | 2,752 | 50.89 |
| Liberal Democrats | Marie Madeleine Lane | 1,023 | 18.92 |
| English Democrat | Berny Boldry | 783 | 14.48 |
| Conservative | Ian Paul Hutchinson | 735 | 13.59 |
| Community Group | Jim Davies | 115 | 2.13 |
| Turnout | | 5,408 | 49.19 |
| Labour hold | | | |

=== Conisbrough and Denaby ===
Conisbrough and Denaby
| Party | Candidate | Votes | % |
|---|---|---|---|
| Labour | Sandra Mary Holland | 3,771 | 57.76 |
| Liberal Democrats | John Victor Butterfield | 753 | 11.53 |
| English Democrat | Julie Anne Bulcroft | 722 | 11.06 |
| BNP | Erwin Toseland | 690 | 10.57 |
| Conservative | Jonathan Sherwin Broughton | 593 | 9.08 |
| Turnout | | 6,529 | 53.66 |
| Labour hold | | | |

=== Edenthorpe, Kirk Sandall and Barnby Dun ===
Edenthorpe, Kirk Sandall and Barnby Dun
| Party | Candidate | Votes | % |
|---|---|---|---|
| Labour | David Andrew Nevett | 1,632 | 24.00 |
| Liberal Democrats | Karl Goodman | 1,585 | 23.31 |
| Conservative | Nick Allen | 1,383 | 20.34 |
| English Democrat | Fred Gee | 1,100 | 16.18 |
| Independent | Michael Thomas Maye | 1,100 | 16.18 |
| Turnout | | 6,800 | 63.00 |
| Labour gain from Independent | | | |

=== Edlington and Warmsworth ===
Edlington and Warmsworth
| Party | Candidate | Votes | % |
|---|---|---|---|
| Labour | Elsie Butler | 2,242 | 37.49 |
| English Democrat | Wayne Crawshaw | 1,024 | 17.12 |
| Conservative | Liz Jones | 863 | 14.43 |
| Liberal Democrats | Dominic Thomas Patterson | 777 | 12.99 |
| Community Group | Margaret Ward | 722 | 12.07 |
| Independent | Rodger Lee | 352 | 5.89 |
| Turnout | | 5,980 | 57.76 |
| Labour hold | | | |

=== Finningley ===
Finningley
| Party | Candidate | Votes | % |
|---|---|---|---|
| Conservative | Richard Allan Jones | 2,988 | 36.97 |
| Liberal Democrats | Richard Alan Johnson | 1,995 | 24.68 |
| English Democrat | Eric Tetley | 1,612 | 19.95 |
| Labour | Francis Jackson | 1,487 | 18.40 |
| Turnout | | 8,082 | 67.85 |
| Conservative hold | | | |

=== Great North Road ===
Great North Road
| Party | Candidate | Votes | % |
|---|---|---|---|
| Labour | Kevin Rodgers | 2,464 | 36.46 |
| Independent | David Hughes | 1,236 | 18.29 |
| English Democrat | Steve Grocott | 1,229 | 18.19 |
| Conservative | Frank Lloyd Calladine | 1,222 | 18.08 |
| Green | Stephen Platt | 607 | 8.98 |
| Turnout | | 6,758 | 58.52 |
| Labour gain from Independent | | | |

=== Hatfield ===
Hatfield
| Party | Candidate | Votes | % |
|---|---|---|---|
| Labour | Linda Curran | 1,961 | 33.76 |
| Conservative | James Vincent Hart | 1,145 | 19.71 |
| English Democrat | Mick Glynn | 801 | 13.79 |
| Independent | Jessie Jamieson Credland | 716 | 12.33 |
| Liberal Democrats | Vic Fairhead | 602 | 10.36 |
| UKIP | William Brooke Shaw | 315 | 5.42 |
| Community Group | Stewart Anthony Rayner | 269 | 4.63 |
| Turnout | | 5,809 | 58.90 |
| Labour gain from Community Group | | | |

=== Mexborough ===
Mexborough
| Party | Candidate | Votes | % |
|---|---|---|---|
| Labour | David Holland | 2,334 | 40.05 |
| Liberal Democrats | Tracey Leyland | 1,784 | 30.61 |
| BNP | Helen Ellis | 785 | 13.47 |
| Conservative | Phyllis Calladine | 512 | 8.79 |
| English Democrat | Ieva Parramore | 413 | 7.09 |
| Turnout | | 5,828 | 52.14 |
| Labour gain from Liberal Democrats | | | |

=== Rossington ===
Rossington
| Party | Candidate | Votes | % |
|---|---|---|---|
| Labour | Barry Johnson | 1,771 | 32.56 |
| Independent | Terry Wilde | 971 | 17.85 |
| Community Group | John Nolan Cooke | 812 | 14.93 |
| English Democrat | Carol Young | 733 | 13.48 |
| Liberal Democrats | Rebecca Atkinson | 638 | 11.73 |
| Conservative | Kathleen Margaret Beard | 514 | 9.45 |
| Turnout | | 5,439 | 54.21 |
| Labour hold | | | |

=== Sprotbrough ===
Sprotbrough
| Party | Candidate | Votes | % |
|---|---|---|---|
| Conservative | Doreen Woodhouse | 2,414 | 37.79 |
| Labour | Peter Millar | 1,802 | 28.21 |
| English Democrat | Barbara Hewitt | 1,342 | 21.01 |
| Green | Lynette Chipp | 830 | 12.99 |
| Turnout | | 6,388 | 67.51 |
| Conservative hold | | | |

=== Stainforth and Moorends ===
Stainforth and Moorends
| Party | Candidate | Votes | % |
|---|---|---|---|
| Labour | Barbara Ann Hedley | 1,884 | 38.08 |
| Conservative | Martin Edward Drake | 1,000 | 20.21 |
| BNP | Dave Owen | 608 | 12.29 |
| English Democrat | Margaret Rose Holt-Taylor | 580 | 11.72 |
| UKIP | Ronald William Clegg | 399 | 8.06 |
| Independent | Derek Troops | 302 | 6.10 |
| Community Group | Mick Green | 175 | 3.54 |
| Turnout | | 4,948 | 52.05 |
| Labour hold | | | |

=== Thorne ===
Thorne
| Party | Candidate | Votes | % |
|---|---|---|---|
| Labour | Eddie Dobbs | 1,653 | 27.46 |
| Conservative | John Brown | 1,383 | 22.98 |
| Independent | Richard Walker | 860 | 14.29 |
| Liberal Democrats | John Brown | 734 | 12.19 |
| Community Group | Tony Brookes | 716 | 11.90 |
| BNP | Anthony Holt | 673 | 11.18 |
| Turnout | | 6,019 | 57.65 |
| Labour gain from Community Group | | | |

=== Torne Valley ===
Torne Valley
| Party | Candidate | Votes | % |
|---|---|---|---|
| Conservative | Patricia Bartlett | 2,863 | 42.05 |
| Liberal Democrats | David Adgar | 1,580 | 23.21 |
| Labour | Rachel Hodson | 1,325 | 19.46 |
| English Democrat | Bernie Aston | 523 | 7.68 |
| UKIP | Rebecca Walters | 517 | 7.59 |
| Turnout | | 6,808 | 69.42 |
| Conservative hold | | | |

=== Town Moor ===
Town Moor
| Party | Candidate | Votes | % |
|---|---|---|---|
| Labour | Jane Kidd | 1,906 | 34.17 |
| Liberal Democrats | Kevin Michael Abell | 1,681 | 30.14 |
| Conservative | Mark David Wells | 969 | 17.37 |
| English Democrat | Guy Aston | 637 | 11.42 |
| UKIP | John Michael Andrews | 270 | 4.84 |
| Green | Darren Robinson | 115 | 2.06 |
| Turnout | | 5,578 | 55.21 |
| Labour gain from Liberal Democrats | | | |

=== Wheatley ===
Wheatley
| Party | Candidate | Votes | % |
|---|---|---|---|
| Labour | Moira Hood | 2,017 | 40.46 |
| English Democrat | Roy John Penketh | 1,539 | 30.87 |
| Liberal Democrats | Liz Hall | 1,429 | 28.67 |
| Turnout | | 4,985 | 51.09 |
| Labour hold | | | |
