= 2009 United Kingdom local elections =

- 4 June 2009

All 27 county councils, 7 out of 55 unitary authorities, 1 sui generis authority, and 3 directly elected mayors
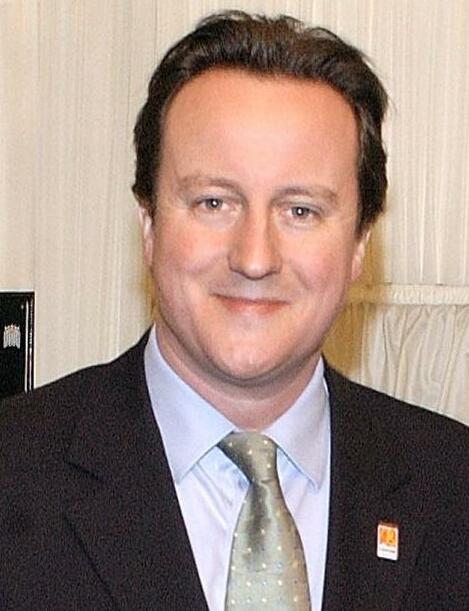

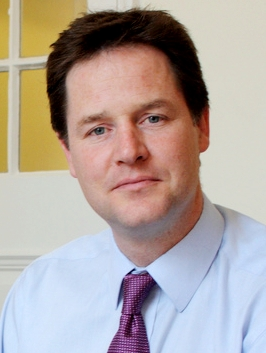

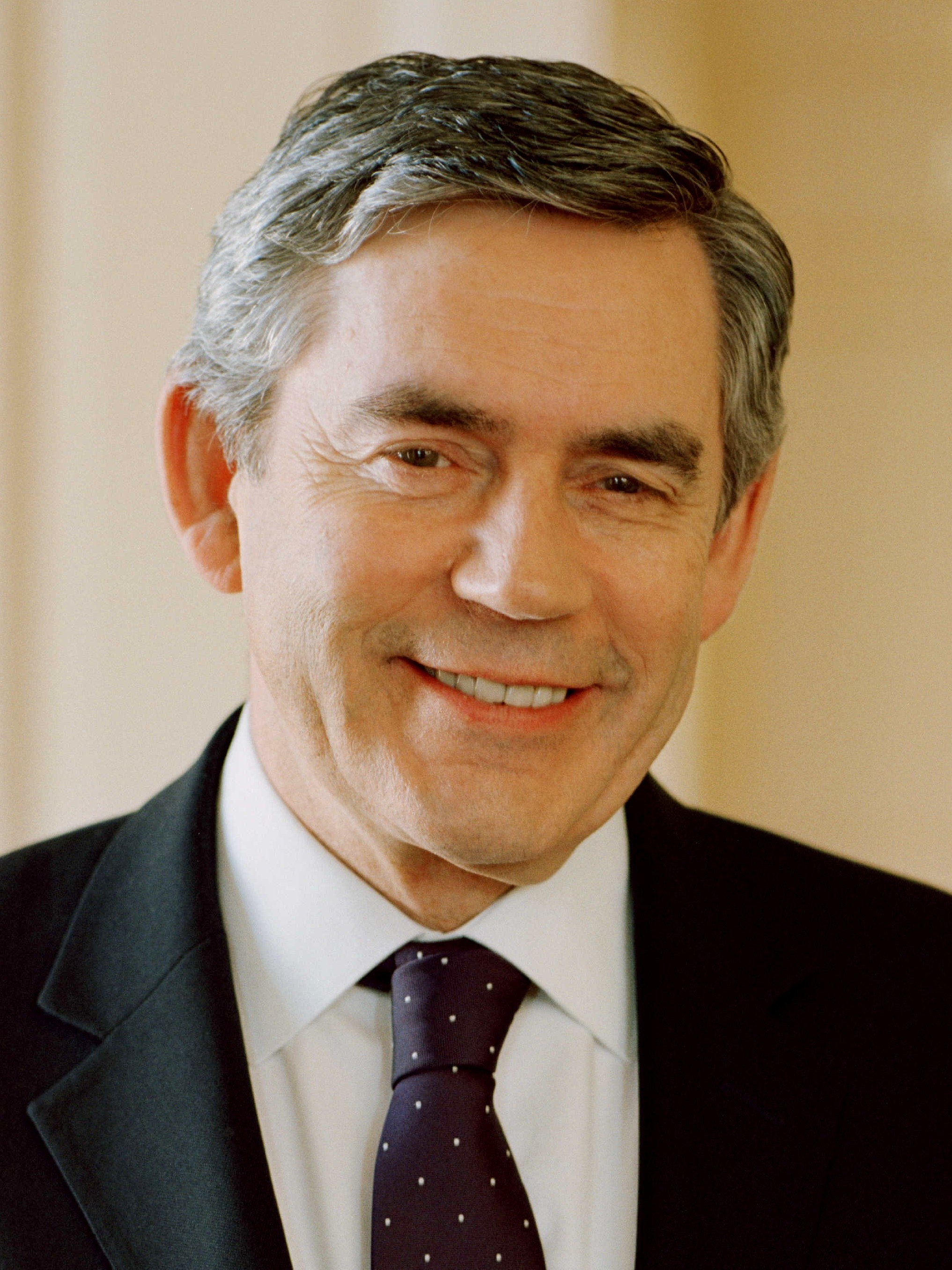
	First party	Second party	Third party
Leader	David Cameron	Nick Clegg	Gordon Brown
Party	Conservative	Liberal Democrats	Labour
Leader since	6 December 2005	18 December 2007	24 June 2007
Percentage	38%	28%	23%
Swing	▼6%	▲3%	▼1%
Councils	30	1	0
Councils +/–	▲7	▼1	▼4
Councillors	1,531	484	178
Councillors +/–	▲244	▼2	▼291
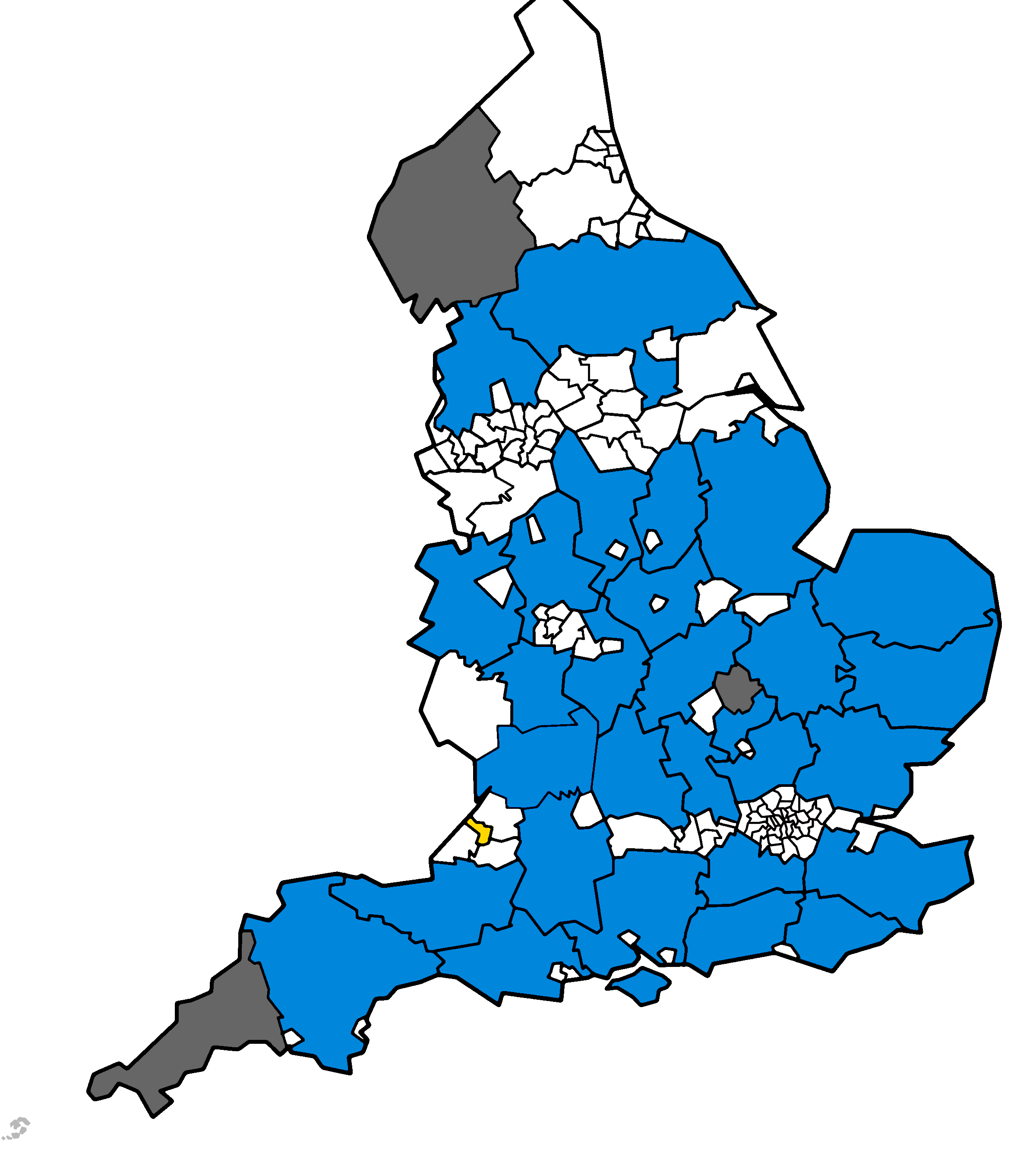
- County council election results

- Unitary authority and mayoral elections

The 2009 United Kingdom local elections were elections held to all 27 County Councils, three existing Unitary Authorities and five new Unitary Authorities, all in England, on 4 June 2009. The elections were due to be held on 7 May 2009, but were delayed in order to coincide with elections to the European Parliament.

The elections resulted in significant gains for the Conservatives. The party won Derbyshire, Nottinghamshire, Staffordshire and Lancashire from Labour, as well as Devon and Somerset from the Liberal Democrats. The Liberal Democrats did however win a majority in Bristol. Despite the optimism for the Conservatives in seat and council gains, their share of the vote at 38% was 6% down on 2008. That said, they had a clear 10% lead over the Liberal Democrats who achieved a respectable second place on 28%. This was the last local elections until 2024 where the Liberal Democrats polled in second place.

Labour, taking the blame in government from a worsening economic climate, soaring unemployment and the expenses scandal, lost all of its councils, with some authorities being swept clear of any Labour councillors at all. The party also performed poorly in the European elections on the same day.

== Results ==
Party	Councillors		Councils	
Party	Number	Change	Number	Change
Conservative	1,531	▲244	30	▲7
Liberal Democrats	484	▼2	1	▼1
Labour	178	▼291	0	▼4
Independent	97	▲6	0	Steady
Green	18	▲8	0	Steady
Residents	9	▲2	0	Steady
UKIP	7	▲7	0	Steady
BNP	3	▲3	0	Steady
Mebyon Kernow	3	Steady	0	Steady
Liberal	2	Steady	0	Steady
Others	30	▲15	0	Steady
No overall control	n/a	n/a	3	▼2

Source: BBC News Isles of Scilly Council not included in the above figures.

== County councils ==
All 27 English County Councils were up for election. All seats on the councils were contested at this election.

Council	Previous control	Result	Details
Buckinghamshire	Conservative	Conservative hold	Details
Cambridgeshire	Conservative	Conservative hold	Details
Cumbria	No overall control	No overall control hold	Details
Derbyshire	Labour	Conservative gain	Details
Devon	Liberal Democrats	Conservative gain	Details
Dorset	Conservative	Conservative hold	Details
East Sussex	Conservative	Conservative hold	Details
Essex	Conservative	Conservative hold	Details
Gloucestershire	Conservative	Conservative hold	Details
Hampshire	Conservative	Conservative hold	Details
Hertfordshire	Conservative	Conservative hold	Details
Kent	Conservative	Conservative hold	Details
Lancashire	Labour	Conservative gain	Details
Leicestershire	Conservative	Conservative hold	Details
Lincolnshire	Conservative	Conservative hold	Details
Norfolk	Conservative	Conservative hold	Details
North Yorkshire	Conservative	Conservative hold	Details
Northamptonshire	Conservative	Conservative hold	Details
Nottinghamshire	Labour	Conservative gain	Details
Oxfordshire	Conservative	Conservative hold	Details
Somerset	Liberal Democrats	Conservative gain	Details
Staffordshire	Labour	Conservative gain	Details
Suffolk	Conservative	Conservative hold	Details
Surrey	Conservative	Conservative hold	Details
Warwickshire	No overall control	Conservative gain	Details
West Sussex	Conservative	Conservative hold	Details
Worcestershire	Conservative	Conservative hold	Details

== Unitary authorities ==
=== Existing authorities ===
Council	Proportion up for election	Previous control	Result	Details
Bristol	1/3	No overall control	Liberal Democrats gain	Details
Isle of Wight	All	Conservative	Conservative hold	Details

=== New authorities ===
Elections were held for five new unitary authorities. All councillors were elected at this election.

Council	Result	Details
Bedford	No overall control	Details
Central Bedfordshire	Conservative	Details
Cornwall	No overall control (Conservative/Independent Coalition)	Details
Shropshire	Conservative	Details
Wiltshire	Conservative	Details

== Isles of Scilly ==
The Council of the Isles of Scilly was created by the Local Government Act 1888, meaning they lie outside the classifications of authorities used in the rest of England.

Council	Proportion up for election	Previous control	Result	Details
Isles of Scilly	All	Independent	Independent hold	Details

== Mayoral elections ==
Local Authority	Previous Mayor	Candidate elected	Details
Doncaster	Martin Winter (Independent)	Peter Davies (English Democrats)	Details
Hartlepool	Stuart Drummond (Independent)	Stuart Drummond (Independent)	Details
North Tyneside	John Harrison (Labour)	Linda Arkley (Conservative)	Details

A mayoral election was also due to be held in Stoke-on-Trent, however voters in the city voted to abolish the directly elected mayor system in a referendum held in October 2008. The referendum decided to replace the mayor and executive system with a council leader and cabinet system of local government.

== See also ==
- 2009 City of London Corporation election
- 2009 structural changes to local government in England
- 2009 European Parliament election in the United Kingdom
