= 2009 Doncaster mayoral election =

2009 English mayoral election

- 4 June 2009
- Registered: 215,632
- Turnout: 35.81%
Candidate	Peter Davies	Michael Maye	Sandra Holland
Party	English Democrat	Independent	Labour
First round	16,961 (22.5%)	17,150 (22.8%)	16,549 (22.0%)
Second round	25,344 (50.4%)	24,990 (49.6%)	Eliminated
Mayor of Doncaster before election
Martin Winter
Labour
Elected Mayor of Doncaster
Peter Davies
English Democrat

The 2009 Doncaster mayoral election was held on the 4 June 2009 to elect the Mayor of Doncaster. Peter Davies of the English Democrats won the election for the term, albeit with a slender majority of 50.4% compared to the runner-up's 49.6%. The election saw the English Democrats win the mayoralty from the previously Labour Party-held mayoralty, in what was called the party's "biggest electoral success".

== Results ==
2009 Doncaster mayoral election
Party	Candidate	1st round		2nd round			1st round votesTransfer votes, 2nd round
Party	Candidate	Total	Of round	Transfers	Total	Of round	1st round votesTransfer votes, 2nd round
English Democrat	Peter Davies	16,961	22.5%	8,383	25,344	50.4%	
Independent	Michael Maye	17,150	22.8%	7,840	24,990	49.6%	
Labour	Sandra Holland	16,549	22.0%				
Conservative	Jonathan Wood	12,198	16.2%				
BNP	David Owen	8,175	10.9%				
Community Group	Stuart Exelby	2,152	2.9%				
Independent	Michael Felse	2,051	2.7%				
English Democrat gain from Labour							
