= 2025 Doncaster mayoral election =

2025 English mayoral election

- 1 May 2025

Mayor of Doncaster
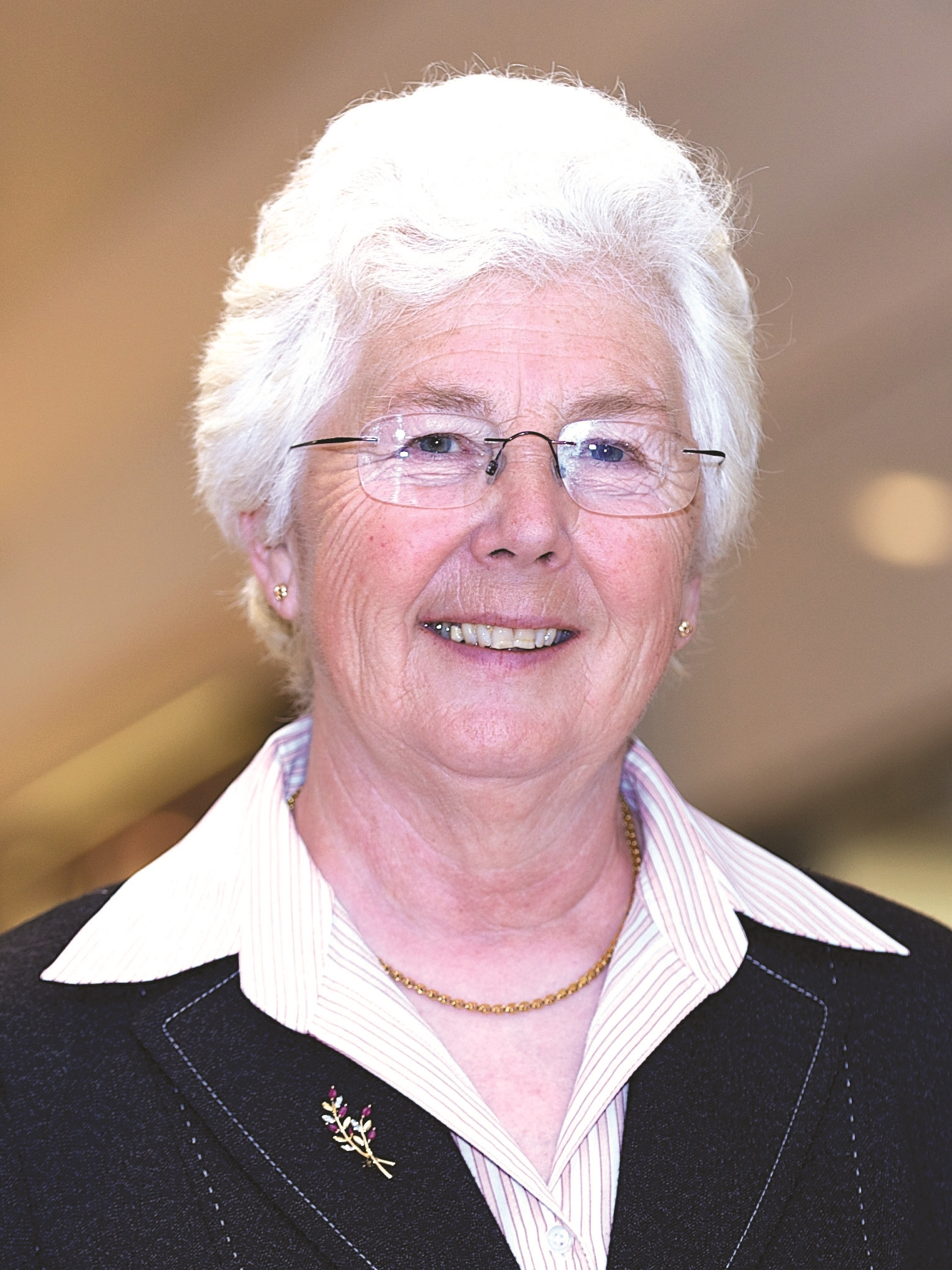

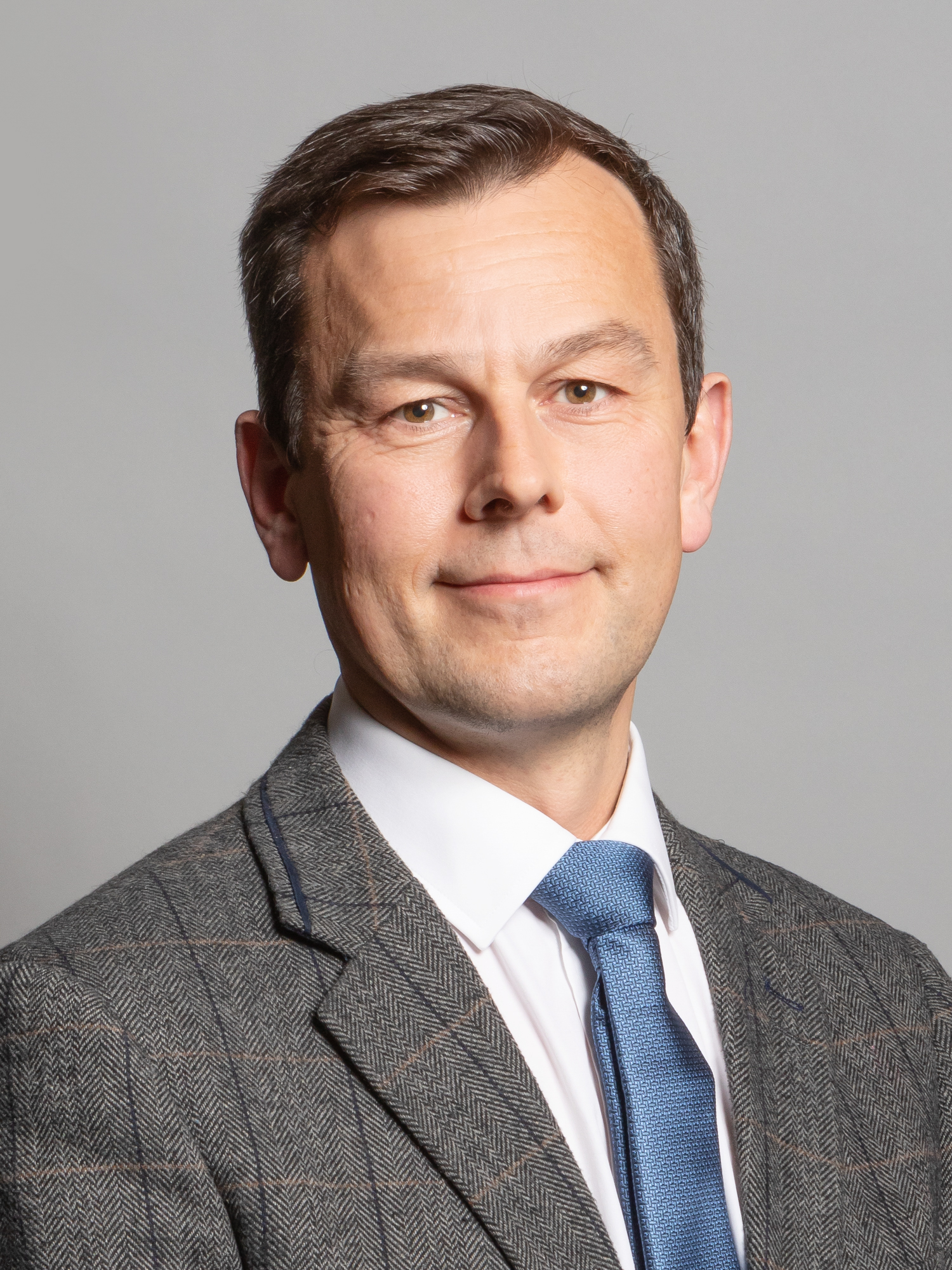
| | First party | Second party | Third party |
|---|---|---|---|
| Candidate | Ros Jones | Alexander Jones | Nick Fletcher |
| Party | Labour | Reform | Conservative |
| Popular vote | 23,805 | 23,107 | 18,982 |
| Percentage | 32.4% | 31.5% | 26.0% |
| Swing | ▼10.9 pp | ▲29.9 pp | ▼2.2 pp |
Mayor before election
Ros Jones
Labour
Elected mayor
Ros Jones
Labour

The 2025 Doncaster mayoral election was held on the 1 May 2025 to elect the Mayor of Doncaster. Incumbent mayor Ros Jones won re-election for a fourth term, albeit with a slender majority of 698 voters. At the separate election for councillors on City of Doncaster Council on the same day, Labour lost its majority and Reform UK won an overall majority.

== Results ==
2025 Doncaster mayoral election
| Party | Candidate | Votes | % | ±% |
|---|---|---|---|---|
| Labour | Ros Jones | 23,805 | 32.4 | −10.9 |
| Reform | Alexander Jones | 23,107 | 31.5 | +29.9 |
| Conservative | Nick Fletcher | 18,982 | 26.0 | −2.2 |
| Green | Julie Buckley | 2,449 | 3.3 | −2.0 |
| Yorkshire | Andrew Walmsley | 1,164 | 1.6 | −4.8 |
| SDP | David Bettney | 929 | 1.3 | |
| Liberal Democrats | Mihai Melenciuc | 895 | 1.2 | |
| British Democrats | Frank Calladine | 448 | 0.6 | |
| Workers Party | Ahsan Jamil | 434 | 0.6 | |
| TUSC | Andy Hiles | 393 | 0.5 | |
| Independent | Richie Vallance | 245 | 0.3 | |
| Independent | Doug Wright | 157 | 0.2 | |
| Majority | | 698 | | −19.1 |
| Rejected ballots | | 398 | 0.5 | |
| Registered electors | | 227,496 | | |
| Turnout | | 73,406 | 32.27 | +4.22 |
