= 2013 Warwickshire County Council election =

2013 UK local government election

← 2009	2 May 2013	2017 →

All 62 seats to Warwickshire County Council 32 seats needed for a majority
	First party	Second party	Third party
Party	Conservative	Labour	Liberal Democrats
Seats won	26	22	9
- Map showing the results of the 2013 Warwickshire County Council elections.
Council control before election
Conservative
Council control after election
No Overall Control

An election to Warwickshire County Council took place on 2 May 2013 as part of the 2013 United Kingdom local elections. 62 councillors were elected from 56 electoral divisions, which returned either one or two county councillors each by first-past-the-post voting for a four-year term of office. The electoral divisions were the same as those used at the previous election in 2009. The election saw the Conservative Party lose overall control of the council.

All locally registered electors (British, Irish, Commonwealth and European Union citizens) who were aged 18 or over on Thursday 2 May 2013 were entitled to vote in the local elections. Those who were temporarily away from their ordinary address (for example, away working, on holiday, in student accommodation or in hospital) were also entitled to vote in the local elections, although those who had moved abroad and registered as overseas electors cannot vote in the local elections. It is possible to register to vote at more than one address (such as a university student who had a term-time address and lives at home during holidays) at the discretion of the local Electoral Register Office, but it remains an offence to vote more than once in the same local government election.

== Summary ==
The Conservative Party lost overall control of the council, but remained the largest party. Council leader Alan Farnell lost his seat to Keith Kondakor of the Green Party, who won their first two county council seats at this election. The Stratford First Independents gained one seat, and an independent candidate gained another. The Labour Party achieved a net gain of 12 seats and the Liberal Democrats lost three, losing their position as the second largest party on the council. The next election is scheduled for 4 May 2017.

== Results ==
Warwickshire County Council election, 2013
Party	Seats	Gains	Losses	Net gain/loss	Seats %	Votes %	Votes	+/−
Conservative	26	2	15	-13	41.94%			
Labour	22	13	1	+12	35.48%			
Liberal Democrats	9	0	3	-3	14.52%			
Green	2	2	0	+2	3.23%			
Independent	1	1	0	+1	1.61%			
Stratford First Independent	1	1	0	+1	1.61%			
Whitnash Residents	1	0	0	0	1.61%			
UKIP	0	0	0	0	0%			
TUSC	0	0	0	0	0%			
BNP	0	0	0	0	0%			
English Democrat	0	0	0	0	0%			

== Candidates ==
The parties with candidates who contested all 62 seats were the Conservative, Labour and Green parties. Liberal Democrats contested 36 divisions. Similarly, UKIP and TUSC stood 22 candidates each. The BNP fielded eight candidates and the English Democrats had one candidate. There were seven independent candidates, three candidates from the Stratford First Independent party, and one candidate from the Whitnash Residents Association.

== Results by District ==
Warwickshire County Council is split into 59 divisions. These are grouped into five districts, each of which has between 8 and 15 division

=== North Warwickshire ===
North Warwickshire had 8 seats. The Conservatives held three (Arley, Coleshill, Water Orton), while Labour held two (Baddesley Ensor, Kingsbury) and took three from the Conservatives (Atherstone, Hartshill, Polesworth).

Arley
Party	Candidate	Votes	%	±%
Conservative	Colin Hayfield	898	45.24%	−17.92%
Labour	John Moore	585	29.47%	+2.82%
UKIP	Kevin Bolton	432	21.76%	N/A
Green	James Barrett	70	3.53%	−14.37%
Majority		313	15.79%	−28.43%
Turnout		1985		
Conservative hold		Swing		

Atherstone
Party	Candidate	Votes	%	±%
Labour	Neil Dirveiks	755	41.83%	+9.46%
UKIP	Robert Gisbourne	575	31.86%	N/A
Conservative	Martin Shaw	441	24.43%	−12.86%
Green	Rebecca Knight	34	1.88%	−11.62%
Majority		180	9.97%	N/A
Turnout		1805		
Labour gain from Conservative		Swing		

Baddesley Ensor
Party	Candidate	Votes	%	±%
Labour	Peter Morson	951	44.50%	+10.13%
UKIP	Richard Freer	587	27.47%	N/A
Conservative	David Wright	539	25.22%	−1.86%
Green	Ann Lewis	60	2.81%	−0.49%
Majority		364	17.03%	
Turnout		2137		
Labour hold		Swing		

Coleshill
Party	Candidate	Votes	%	±%
Conservative	Peter Fowler	969	41.84%	−9.08%
Labour	Harry Taylor	803	34.67%	+20.09%
UKIP	Mandy Williams	491	21.20%	N/A
Green	Martin Atkin	53	2.29%	−7.26%
Majority		166	7.17%	
Turnout		2316		
Conservative hold		Swing		

Hartshill
Party	Candidate	Votes	%	±%
Labour	Ann McLauchlan	704	34.90%	+7.12%
UKIP	Bella Wayte	676	33.52%	N/A
Conservative	Carol Fox	579	28.71%	−15.68%
Green	Richard Brayne	58	2.88%	−6.81%
Majority		28	1.39%	N/A
Turnout		2,017		
Labour gain from Conservative		Swing		

Kingsbury
Party	Candidate	Votes	%	±%
Labour	Brian Moss	904	53.49%	+4.62%
UKIP	Ruth Bettie	420	24.85%	N/A
Conservative	Karen Mercer-West	331	19.59%	−19.33%
Green	George Hardwick	35	2.07%	−10.14%
Majority		484	28.64%	
Turnout		1690		
Labour hold		Swing		

Polesworth
Party	Candidate	Votes	%	±%
Labour	Dave Parsons	1089	46.14%	+6.31%
UKIP	David Williams	635	26.91%	N/A
Conservative	David Humphreys	590	25.00%	−21.89%
Green	Michael Adkins	46	1.95%	−11.33%
Majority		454	19.24%	N/A
Turnout		2360		
Labour gain from Conservative		Swing		

Water Orton
Party	Candidate	Votes	%	±%
Conservative	Joan Lea	689	36.83%	−26.08%
Labour	Daniel Hodkinson	663	35.44%	+17.75%
UKIP	Louis John	455	24.32%	N/A
Green	Sarah Richards	64	3.42%	−15.99%
Majority		26	1.39%	
Turnout		1871		
Conservative hold		Swing		

=== Nuneaton and Bedworth ===
In this large area the Conservatives held two seats (Nuneaton St Nicholas, Nuneaton Whitestone). Labour held six seats (Bede, Bedworth West, Nuneaton Abbey, Nuneaton Camp Hill, Nuneaton Wem Brook, Poplar) and gained five from the Conservatives (both Arbury and Stockingford seats, Bedworth North, Bulkington, Nuneaton Galley Common). The Green Party gained one seat from the Conservatives (Nuneaton Weddington).

Arbury and Stockingford (2)
Party	Candidate	Votes	%	±%
Labour	Bill Olner	2092	30.43%	
Labour	Caroline Phillips	1823	26.52%	
Conservative	Robert Tromans	868	12.63%	
Conservative	Oliver Lane	856	12.45%	
BNP	Alwyn Deacon	386	5.61%	
Independent	Aston Jones-Oakley	256	3.72%	
Green	Judith Barrett	206	3.00%	
Green	Michael Wright	163	2.37%	
TUSC	Pete Bradley	115	1.67%	
TUSC	Steve Gee	110	1.60%	
Majority				
Turnout				
Labour gain from Conservative		Swing		
Labour gain from Conservative		Swing		

Bede
Party	Candidate	Votes	%	±%
Labour	Richard Chattaway	1357	65.78%	+20.46%
Conservative	Arthur Liggins	338	16.38%	−4.44%
BNP	Yvonne Deacon	147	7.13%	−13.87%
English Democrat	David Lane	146	7.08%	−2.14%
Green	Janet Alty	58	2.81%	−0.83%
TUSC	Kate Hunter	17	0.82%	+0.82%
Majority		1019	49.39%	
Turnout		2063		
Labour hold		Swing		

Bedworth North
Party	Candidate	Votes	%	±%
Labour	Sara Doughty	990	58.51%	+31.77%
Conservative	Gary Dancer	445	26.30%	−4.59%
BNP	Brendan Pearson	146	8.63%	−7.15%
Green	Roger Hill	85	5.02%	−10.21%
TUSC	Margaret Hunter	26	1.54%	N/A
Majority		545	32.21%	
Turnout		1692		
Labour gain from Conservative		Swing		

Bedworth West
Party	Candidate	Votes	%	±%
Labour	Keith Richardson	1219	58.05%	+23.26%
Conservative	Janet Batterbee	569	27.10%	−3.27%
Green	Merle Gering	173	8.24%	+1.43%
TUSC	Natara Hunter	139	6.62%	N/A
Majority		650	30.95%	
Turnout		2100		
Labour hold		Swing		

Bulkington
Party	Candidate	Votes	%	±%
Labour	John Beaumont	1036	50.36%	+24.40%
Conservative	Richard Smith	861	41.86%	−6.35%
Green	Andrew Patrick	160	7.78%	−3.13%
Majority		175	8.51%	
Turnout		2057		
Labour gain from Conservative		Swing		

Nuneaton Abbey
Party	Candidate	Votes	%	±%
Labour	Robert Hicks	955	63.12%	+25.63%
Conservative	Stephen Paxton	291	19.23%	−2.11%
Green	Juliet Carter	96	6.35%	−10.78%
BNP	Maureen Lincoln	95	6.28%	−6.98%
TUSC	George Clark	76	5.02%	N/A
Majority		664	43.89%	
Turnout		1513		
Labour hold		Swing		

Nuneaton Camp Hill
Party	Candidate	Votes	%	±%
Labour	Corinne Davies	709	63.36%	+30.20%
Conservative	Mark Gutteridge	201	17.96%	−8.37%
BNP	Jason Holmes	100	8.94%	−21.92%
TUSC	Paul Reilly	67	5.99%	N/A
Green	Avnash Jhita	42	3.75%	−5.9%
Majority		508	45.40%	
Turnout		1119		
Labour hold		Swing		

Nuneaton Galley Common
Party	Candidate	Votes	%	±%
Labour	Philip Johnson	643	46.83%	+25.51%
Conservative	James Foster	563	41.01%	+0.48%
Green	Marcia Watson	98	7.14%	+1.82%
TUSC	Paige McGuire	69	5.03%	N/A
Majority		80	5.83%%	N/A
Turnout		1373		
Labour gain from Conservative		Swing		

Nuneaton St. Nicolas
Party	Candidate	Votes	%	±%
Conservative	Jeffrey Clarke	1290	51.15%	−13.57%
Green	Michele Kondakor	717	28.43%	+12.65%
Labour	Sonja Wilson	460	18.24%	−1.25%
TUSC	Daniel White	55	2.18%	N/A
Majority		573	22.72%	
Turnout		2522		
Conservative hold		Swing		

Nuneaton Weddington
Party	Candidate	Votes	%	±%
Green	Keith Kondakor	1032	42.72%	+25.36%
Conservative	Alan Farnell	748	30.96%	−29.22%
Labour	Samuel Margrave	364	15.07%	−7.38%
UKIP	Dennis Slipper	264	10.93%	+N/A
TUSC	Brendan McGraff	8	0.33%	N/A
Majority		284	11.75%	N/A
Turnout		2416		
Green gain from Conservative		Swing		

Nuneaton Wem Brook
Party	Candidate	Votes	%	±%
Labour	June Tandy	1133	61.05%	+17.57%
Conservative	Hayden Walmsley	252	13.58%	−9.35%
Independent	William Sheppard	165	8.89%	N/A
Green	Scott Alexander	162	8.73%	
BNP	Phillip Kimberley	87	4.69%	−17.48%
TUSC	Peter Playdon	29	1.56%	N/A
Independent	Scott Harbison	28	1.51%	N/A
Majority		881	47.47%	
Turnout		1856		
Labour hold		Swing		

Nuneaton Whitestone
Party	Candidate	Votes	%	±%
Conservative	Martin Heatley	1173	52.89%	−1.42%
Labour	Andrew Crichton	697	31.42%	+13.97%
Green	Ian Bonner	348	15.69%	+1.7%
Majority		476	21.46%	
Turnout		2218		
Conservative hold		Swing		

Poplar
Party	Candidate	Votes	%	±%
Labour	Julie Jackson	955	64.05%	+24.81%
Conservative	Ian Llewellyn-Nash	282	18.91%	−14.05%
BNP	Glyn Haycock	164	11.00%	−6.82%
Green	Felicity Rock	64	4.29%	−5.68%
TUSC	Catherine Mosey	26	1.74%	N/A
Majority		673	45.14%	
Turnout		1491		
Labour hold		Swing		

=== Rugby ===
The Conservatives held five (Admirals, Earl Craven, Fosse, both seats in Caldecott), the Liberal Democrats held two (Eastlands and Hillmorton x 2), Labour gained three seats from the Conservatives (Lawford and New Bilton, both seats in Brownsover). Independent candidate Howard Roberts gained Dunchurch from the Conservatives.

Admirals
Party	Candidate	Votes	%	±%
Conservative	Peter Butlin	772	48.49%	−4.04%
Labour	John Wells	568	35.68%	+14.15%
Green	Peter Reynolds	133	8.35%	−4.36%
Liberal Democrats	Chris Holman	76	4.77%	−8.47%
TUSC	Steve Roberts	43	2.70%	N/A
Majority		204	12.66%	
Turnout		1612		
Conservative hold		Swing		

Brownsover (2)
Party	Candidate	Votes	%	±%
Labour	Alan Webb	1682	22.72%	
Labour	Mary Webb	1504	20.32%	
Conservative	Carolyn Robyns	1121	15.14%	
Conservative	Helen Walton	1007	13.60%	
UKIP	Mickey Singh	841	11.36%	
Green	Lorna Dunleavy	326	4.40%	
Green	Steven Wright	269	3.63%	
Liberal Democrats	Neil Sandison	246	3.32%	
TUSC	Bill Smith	215	2.90%	
Liberal Democrats	Dale Keeling	191	2.58%	
Turnout				
Labour gain from Conservative		Swing		
Labour gain from Conservative		Swing		

Caldecott (2)
Party	Candidate	Votes	%	±%
Conservative	Kam Kaur	1727	21.70%	
Conservative	Yousef Dahmash	1605	20.17%	
Liberal Democrats	Bill Lewis	1093	13.73%	
Labour	Claire Edwards	909	11.42%	
Liberal Democrats	Dave Merritt	851	10.69%	
Labour	Ish Mistry	843	10.59%	
Green	Kate Crowley	362	4.55%	
Green	Louisa Taylor	287	3.61%	
TUSC	Julie Weekes	148	1.86%	
TUSC	Rob Johnson	134	1.68%	
Turnout				
Conservative hold		Swing		
Conservative hold		Swing		

Dunchurch
Party	Candidate	Votes	%	±%
Independent	Howard Roberts	1488	54.05%	N/A
Conservative	Robin Hazelton	988	35.89%	−28.42%
Labour	Doreen Cox	161	5.85%	−2.66%
Green	Susan Tucker	75	2.72%	−6.29%
TUSC	Ally MacGregor	41	1.49%	N/A
Majority		500	18.16%	N/A
Turnout		2753		
Independent gain from Conservative		Swing		

Earl Craven
Party	Candidate	Votes	%	±%
Conservative	Heather Timms	1434	63.88%	+1.15%
Labour	John Slinger	569	25.35%	+12.4%
Green	Ellie Roderick	189	8.42%	−3.39%
TUSC	Bert Harris	53	2.36%	N/A
Majority		865	38.53%	
Turnout		2245		
Conservative hold		Swing		

Eastlands and Hillmorton (2)
Party	Candidate	Votes	%	±%
Liberal Democrats	Jerry Roodhouse	1593	22.49%	
Liberal Democrats	Richard Dodd	1542	21.77%	
Labour	Barbara Brown	936	13.21%	
Conservative	David Cranham	881	12.44%	
Conservative	Katie Ferrier	804	11.35%	
Labour	Steve Weston	786	11.10%	
Green	Phil Godden	232	3.28%	
Green	James Harris	190	2.68%	
TUSC	Dave Goodwin	119	1.68%	
Turnout				
Liberal Democrats hold		Swing		
Liberal Democrats hold		Swing		

Fosse
Party	Candidate	Votes	%	±%
Conservative	Phillip Morris-Jones	1128	49.30%	−13.75
UKIP	John Birch	604	26.40%	N/A
Labour	Andy Coles	432	18.88%	+6.64%
Green	Ben Phillips	104	4.55%	−6.98%
TUSC	Marian Wakelin	20	0.87%	N/A
Majority		524	22.90%	
Turnout		2288		
Conservative hold		Swing		

Lawford and New Bilton
Party	Candidate	Votes	%	±%
Labour	Maggie O'Rourke	836	38.83%	+9.86%
Conservative	Christopher Cade	523	24.29%	−11.53%
UKIP	Roy Harvey	490	22.76%	N/A
Green	Roy Sandison	92	4.27%	−9.2%
TUSC	Pete McLaren	77	3.58%	N/A
Independent	Andrew Crane	75	3.48%	N/A
Liberal Democrats	Thomas Hardgrave	60	2.79%	−6.83%
Majority		313	14.54%	N/A
Turnout		2153		
Labour gain from Conservative		Swing		

=== Stratford-on-Avon ===
The Conservatives held eight (Alcester, Aston Cantlow, Feldon, Henley-in-Arden, Kineton, Shipston-on-Stour, Southam, Stour and the Vale) and gained two from the Liberal Democrats (Bidford-on-Avon, Wellesbourne). The Liberal Democrats held three seats (Studley, both seats in Stratford South) and the Stratford First Independent Party standing in three, achieved one seat (Stratford Avenue and New Town).

Alcester
Party	Candidate	Votes	%	±%
Conservative	Mike Gittus	1207	49.69%	+1.21%
Liberal Democrats	Susan Juned	807	33.22%	−10.24%
Labour	Andrew Foster	290	11.94%	+9.4%
Green	Karen Varga	125	5.15%	−0.36%
Majority		400	16.47%	
Turnout		2429		
Conservative hold		Swing		

Aston Cantlow
Party	Candidate	Votes	%	±%
Conservative	John Horner	1407	69.48%	+2.53%
Liberal Democrats	Trevor Honeychurch	249	12.30%	−6.93%
Green	Bruce Knight	197	9.73%	+0.16%
Labour	Janice Sewell	172	8.49%	+4.24%
Majority		1158	57.19%	
Turnout		2025		
Conservative hold		Swing		

Bidford-on-Avon
Party	Candidate	Votes	%	±%
Conservative	Mike Brain	1133	42.88%	+6.23%
Liberal Democrats	Peter Barnes	1113	42.13%	−9.66%
Labour	Barry Doherty	202	7.65%	+4.27%
Green	Nicole Varga	194	7.34%	−0.84%
Majority		20	0.77%	
Turnout		2642		
Conservative gain from Liberal Democrats		Swing		

Feldon
Party	Candidate	Votes	%	±%
Conservative	Bob Stevens	1335	63.54%	−9.21%
Labour	James Briggs	341	16.23%	N/A
Green	Jessica Pinson	215	10.23%	+2.58%
Liberal Democrats	Richard Dickson	210	10.00%	−28.01%
Majority		994	47.31%	
Turnout		2101		
Conservative hold		Swing		

Henley-in-Arden
Party	Candidate	Votes	%	±%
Conservative	Mike Perry	1181	55.68%	−11.87%
UKIP	Brett Parsons	594	28.01%	N/A
Labour	Andrew Henderson	163	7.69%	+2.73%
Liberal Democrats	Diane Walden	121	5.70%	−13.56%
Green	Gareth Davies	62	2.92%	−5.31%
Majority		587	27.68%	
Turnout		2121		
Conservative hold		Swing		

Kineton
Party	Candidate	Votes	%	±%
Conservative	Chris Williams	921	38.18%	−13.36%
UKIP	Paul De'Ath	767	31.80%	N/A
Liberal Democrats	David Booth	421	17.45%	−20.29%
Labour	Jane Soni	180	7.46%	+7.46%
Green	Robert Ballantyne	123	5.10%	−5.63%
Majority		154	6.38%	
Turnout		2412		
Conservative hold		Swing		

Shipston-on-Stour
Party	Candidate	Votes	%	±%
Conservative	Chris Saint	1064	33.46%	−21.96%
Liberal Democrats	Richard Cheney	1010	31.76%	+2.31%
Labour	Jackie Warner	569	17.89%	+9.74%
UKIP	Steve Taylor	407	12.80%	N/A
Green	Dave Passingham	130	4.09%	−2.88%
Majority		54	1.70%	
Turnout		3180		
Conservative hold		Swing		

Southam
Party	Candidate	Votes	%	±%
Conservative	John Appleton	696	34.34%	−11.57%
Labour	Carol Anne Pratt	590	29.15%	+12.13%
Independent	David Wise	557	27.52%	N/A
Green	Clare Phillips	93	4.59%	−4.77%
Liberal Democrats	David Fisher	88	4.35%	−23.36%
Majority		106	5.24%	
Turnout		2024		
Conservative hold		Swing		

Stour and the Vale
Party	Candidate	Votes	%	±%
Conservative	Izzi Seccombe	1759	57.71%	−8.89%
UKIP	Edward Fila	669	21.59%	N/A
Labour	Emma Rowlands	317	10.40%	N/A
Liberal Democrats	Bruce Robertson	155	5.09%	−16.77%
Green	Katie Lester	148	4.86%	
Majority		1090	35.76%	
Turnout		3048		
Conservative hold		Swing		

Stratford Avenue and New Town
Party	Candidate	Votes	%	±%
Stratford First Independent	Keith Lloyd	621	33.21%	N/A
Conservative	Tony Jefferson	419	22.41%	−14.66%
Liberal Democrats	Clive Thomas	278	14.87%	−34.19%
UKIP	Julia Walsh	259	13.85%	N/A
Labour	Jason Fojtik	253	12.57%	+6.90%
Green	Mark Griffiths	58	3.10%	−5.09%
Majority		202	10.80%	N/A
Turnout		1870		
Independent gain from Conservative		Swing		

Stratford South (2)
Party	Candidate	Votes	%	±%
Liberal Democrats	Kate Rolfe	2234	21.71%	
Liberal Democrats	Jenny Fradgley	2184	21.22%	
Conservative	Phil Applin	1756	17.06%	
Conservative	Ron Cockings	1582	15.37%	
Stratford First Independent	Gill Davies	621	6.03%	
Stratford First Independent	Neil Basnett	600	5.83%	
Labour	Graham Thompson	467	4.54%	
Labour	Steve Troup	357	3.47%	
Green	Debbie Griffiths	333	1.54%	
Green	John Liddamore	158	1.54%	
Majority				
Turnout				
Liberal Democrats hold		Swing		
Liberal Democrats hold		Swing		

Studley
Party	Candidate	Votes	%	±%
Liberal Democrats	Clive Rickhards	973	49.87%	−4.04%
Conservative	Justin Kerridge	630	32.29%	−10.37%
Labour	Wayne Bates	255	13.07%	+8.25%
Green	Stan Shire	93	4.77%	−1.93%
Majority		343	17.58%	
Turnout		1951		
Liberal Democrats hold		Swing		

Wellesbourne
Party	Candidate	Votes	%	±%
Conservative	Danny Kendall	922	38.18%	−4.67%
Liberal Democrats	David Johnston	766	31.72%	−18.77%
UKIP	Jane Brooks	527	21.82%	N/A
Labour	Glesni Thomas	141	5.84%	+5.84%
Green	Rob Schie	59	2.44%	−4.22%
Majority		156	6.46%	
Turnout		2415		
Conservative gain from Liberal Democrats		Swing		

=== Warwick ===
The Conservatives held six seats (Bishop's Tachbrook, Cubbington, Kenilworth Park Hill, Kenilworth St John's, Leek Wootton, Warwick South), whereas Labour held one (Leamington Willes) and gained two (Warwick North and Warwick West) from the Conservatives. The Liberal Democrats held four (Kenilworth Abbey, Leamington Milverton, and both seats in Leamington North). The Greens gained one (Leamington Brunswick) from Labour. Whitnash Residents' Association held their seat in Whitnash.

Bishop's Tachbrook
Party	Candidate	Votes	%	±%
Conservative	Les Caborn	1104	59.48%	−0.05%
Labour	John Barrott	477	25.70%	+11.57%
Green	Nicola Stevenson	199	10.72%	−1.11%
Liberal Democrats	Moh Ahson	76	4.09%	−10.41%
Majority		627	33.78%	
Turnout		1856		
Conservative hold		Swing		

Cubbington
Party	Candidate	Votes	%	±%
Conservative	Wallace Redford	1077	39.29%	−7.74%
Independent	David Saul	787	28.71%	N/A
Labour	John Roberts	488	17.80%	+4.34%
Green	Janice Austin	227	8.28%	−1.75%
Liberal Democrats	David Robertson	162	5.91%	−9.12%
Majority		290	10.58%	
Turnout		2741		
Conservative hold		Swing		

Kenilworth Abbey
Party	Candidate	Votes	%	±%
Liberal Democrats	John Whitehouse	1120	42.15%	−1.29%
Conservative	Richard Davies	800	30.11%	−12.9%
UKIP	Paul Sootheran	356	13.40%	N/A
Labour	Joshua Payne	270	10.16%	+3.86%
Green	James Harrison	111	4.18%	−3.07%
Majority		320	12.04%	
Turnout		2657		
Liberal Democrats hold		Swing		

Kenilworth Park Hill
Party	Candidate	Votes	%	±%
Conservative	Dave Shilton	1291	57.40%	+3.52%
Labour	Justine Potts	480	21.34%	+11.19%
Green	Pam Lunn	260	11.56%	+1.72%
Liberal Democrats	Alison Tyler	218	9.69%	−16.45%
Majority		811	36.06%	
Turnout		2249		
Conservative hold		Swing		

Kenilworth St John's
Party	Candidate	Votes	%	±%
Conservative	Alan Cockburn	1037	49.64%	+2.01%
Liberal Democrats	Kate Dickson	417	19.96%	−8.14%
Labour	Richard Grimes	406	19.44%	+8.05%
Green	Pippa Austin	229	10.96%	+3.07%
Majority		620	29.68%	
Turnout		2089		
Conservative hold		Swing		

Leamington Brunswick
Party	Candidate	Votes	%	±%
Green	Jonathan Chilvers	1156	62.15%	+45.19%
Labour	Barbara Weed	533	28.66%	−9.67%
Conservative	Kit Long	104	5.59%	−22.68%
Liberal Democrats	George Begg	41	2.20%	−14.23%
TUSC	Alex Walker	26	1.40%	N/A
Majority		623	33.49%	
Turnout		1860		
Green gain from Labour		Swing		

Leamington Milverton
Party	Candidate	Votes	%	±%
Liberal Democrats	Bill Gifford	1261	52.28%	+8.02%
Conservative	Hayley Grainger	423	17.54%	−9.73%
Labour	Malcolm Fraser	368	15.26%	+6.90%
UKIP	Ian Tyres	206	8.54%	N/A
Green	Ian Davison	154	6.38%	−13.72%
Majority		838	34.74%	
Turnout		2412		
Liberal Democrats hold		Swing		

Leamington North (2)
Party	Candidate	Votes	%	±%
Liberal Democrats	Sarah Boad	1984	21.43%	
Liberal Democrats	Nicola Davies	1804	19.48%	
Conservative	Martin Foley	1359	14.68%	
Conservative	Michael Timmins	1235	13.34%	
Labour	Jane Knight	1129	12.19%	
Labour	Jerry Weber	1087	11.74%	
Green	Helen Mcnamara	364	3.93%	
Green	Nathaniel Shiers	297	3.21%	
Majority				
Turnout				
Liberal Democrats hold		Swing		
Liberal Democrats hold		Swing		

Leamington Willes
Party	Candidate	Votes	%	±%
Labour	Matt Western	993	57.87%	+18.32%
Conservative	Sarah Windrum	420	24.48%	−7.43%
Green	Thea Hamilton	207	12.06%	−2.78%
Liberal Democrats	David Alexander	96	5.59%	−8.11%
Majority		573	33.39%	
Turnout		1716		
Labour hold		Swing		

Leek Wootton
Party	Candidate	Votes	%	±%
Conservative	Jose Compton	1424	76.03%	+1.94%
Labour	Andy Marshall	181	9.66%	+4.94%
Green	James Alty	171	9.13%	−0.84%
Liberal Democrats	John Wilson	97	5.18%	−6.03%
Majority		1243	66.36%	
Turnout		1873		
Conservative hold		Swing		

Warwick North
Party	Candidate	Votes	%	±%
Labour	Jenny St John	813	35.38%	+4.09%
Conservative	Martyn Ashford	797	34.68%	−9.87%
UKIP	Martin MacKenzie	519	22.58%	N/A
Green	Alison Browne	104	4.53%	−8.01%
Liberal Democrats	Heather Calver	65	2.83%	−8.80%
Majority		16	0.69%	N/A
Turnout		2308		
Labour gain from Conservative		Swing		

Warwick South
Party	Candidate	Votes	%	±%
Conservative	Angela Warner	1010	40.22%	−12.16%
Labour	Roger Smith	635	25.29%	+7.18%
UKIP	Tim Griffiths	548	21.82%	
Liberal Democrats	Geoffrey Harris	167	6.65%	−10.52%
Green	Matt Swift	151	6.01%	−6.33%
Majority		375	14.93%	
Turnout		2511		
Conservative hold		Swing		

Warwick West
Party	Candidate	Votes	%	±%
Labour	John Holland	1087	43.80%	12.83%
Conservative	Noel Butler	951	38.32%	+0.45%
Green	Graham Browne	189	7.61%	−1.86%
BNP	George Jones	131	5.28%	−3.04%
Liberal Democrats	Alan Beddow	124	5.00%	−8.38%
Majority		136	5.48%	N/A
Turnout		2482		
Labour gain from Conservative		Swing		

Whitnash
Party	Candidate	Votes	%	±%
Whitnash Residents	Bernard Kirton	1321	67.78%	+4.38%
Labour	Raj Kang	321	16.47%	+4.93%
Conservative	Richard Brookes	185	9.49%	−5.82%
Green	Jim Berreen	122	6.26%	−0.15%
Majority		1000	51.31%	
Turnout		1949		
Whitnash Residents hold		Swing		
