= Civil Liberty (UK) =

Civil Liberty was a fundraising organisation for British nationalists, that was run by members of the far-right British National Party (BNP) and British Democratic Party (BDP). It had been described as a front organisation.

== Organisation ==
Civil Liberty was set up by Kevin Scott, who was a regional organiser for the BNP until 2006. Scott has continued to run the organisation. An investigation by The Guardian established that the group's address was registered to Tyneside BNP, and its website domain was registered at the address of the BNP's website editor. Its national treasurer was the BNP's head of administration. The group raises money to support nationalists, and was set up to "monitor anti-white racism". The anti-fascist group Hope not Hate described the group as a "fake 'civil rights' organisation" and argued that its claim to support individuals "who have fallen victim to the tyranny of government" to only apply to white people. Scott has since joined the British Democratic Party, a BNP breakaway group founded by former Member of the European Parliament (MEP) and National Front chairman Andrew Brons.

The organisation's website had not been updated since January 2020. The domain expired in December 2023.

== Fundraising in the United States ==
Nick Griffin, the then leader of the BNP, was recorded at a conference organised by a former member of the Ku Klux Klan in the United States calling for American supporters of the party to give money to Civil Liberty rather than the BNP because of laws against international donations. He said the group "helps members of the BNP and that is within the law". Following publication of The Guardian's investigation, the Metropolitan Police's Domestic Extremism Unit started an inquiry into the link between Civil Liberty and the BNP.
