= 2009 Surrey County Council election =

2009 UK local government election

- 4 June 2009

All 80 seats to Surrey County Council 41 seats needed for a majority
	First party	Second party	Third party
Party	Conservative	Liberal Democrats	RA
Last election	58	12	7
Seats won	56	13	9
Seat change	▼2	▲1	▲2
- The results of the Surrey County Council election 2009 by electoral division. (Although the Walton Division should be in dark grey – won by Walton Residents – and not in LibDem yellow).
party before election
Conservative
Elected party
Conservative

Elections to Surrey County Council took place on 4 June 2009 as part of the 2009 United Kingdom local elections, having been delayed from 7 May in order for the elections to take place alongside those to the European Parliament.

All locally registered electors (British, Irish, Commonwealth and European Union citizens) who were aged 18 or over on Thursday 4 June 2009 were entitled to vote in the local elections. Those who were temporarily away from their ordinary address (for example, away working, on holiday, in student accommodation or in hospital) were also entitled to vote in the local elections, although those who had moved abroad and registered as overseas electors could not vote in the local elections. It is possible to register to vote at more than one address (such as a university student who had a term-time address and lives at home during holidays) at the discretion of the local Electoral Register Office, but it remains an offence to vote more than once in the same local government election. The next election was scheduled for May 2013.

== Summary ==
The Conservatives maintained overall control of the council with a 32-seat majority over all other Parties (56 seats to 24). The Liberal Democrat Group remained the council's official opposition, with 13 seats. The Labour Party lost one of its two seats and retained the other. The one Independent councillor retained his seat.

== Results ==
Surrey County Council election, 2009
Party	Seats	Gains	Losses	Net gain/loss	Seats %	Votes %	Votes	+/−
Conservative	56	5	7	-2	70.0	46.1	156,228	
Liberal Democrats	13	5	4	+1	16.2	27.1	91,668	
Residents	9	2	0	+2	11.2	5.9	20,050	
Labour	1	0	1	-1	1.2	5.7	19,393	
Independent	1	1	1	0	1.2	2.5	8,505	
UKIP	0	0	0	0	0.0	10.0	33,927	
Green	0	0	0	0	0.0	1.9	6,411	
BNP	0	0	0	0	0.0	0.5	1,618	
Peace	0	0	0	0	0.0	0.0	147	
Others	0	0	0	0	0.0	0.2	656	

== Results by Division (A-Z) ==
Addlestone Division
Party	Candidate	Votes	%	±%
Conservative	John Furey	2,073	51.1	−2.1
UKIP	Gillian Ellis	911	22.5	N/A
Liberal Democrats	Peter Key	576	14.2	−4.9
Labour	David Bell	413	10.2	−15.2
Equal Parenting Alliance	Keith Collett	83	2.0	N/A
Majority		1162	28.6	+0.8
Turnout		4056	N/A	N/A
Conservative hold		Swing	N/A	

Ash Division
Party	Candidate	Votes	%	±%
Conservative	Marsha Moseley	1,591	52.0	+0.9
Liberal Democrats	Carolyn Hilliar	688	22.5	−10.7
UKIP	Pamela Wellstead	503	16.4	N/A
Green	Stephen Rainbird	277	9.1	N/A
Majority		903	29.5	+11.6
Turnout		3059	N/A	N/A
Conservative hold		Swing	N/A	

Ashford Division
Party	Candidate	Votes	%	±%
Conservative	Carol Coleman *	2,180	55.0	+1.4
Liberal Democrats	Colin Strong	1297	32.7	+18.1
Labour	John May	489	12.3	−14.4
Majority		883	22.3	−4.6
Turnout		3966	N/A	N/A
Conservative hold		Swing	N/A	

Ashtead Division
Party	Candidate	Votes	%	±%
Independent	Christopher Townsend	2,645	47.7	+11.6
Conservative	Tim Ashton *	2082	37.5	−3.9
UKIP	Michael Foulston	302	5.4	+2.6
Liberal Democrats	Julie Morris	210	3.8	−6.4
Green	Tony Cooper	170	3.1	N/A
Labour	Susan Gilchrist	138	2.5	−7.1
Majority		563	10.2	+4.9
Turnout		5547	N/A	N/A
Independent gain from Conservative		Swing	N/A	

Banstead East Division
Party	Candidate	Votes	%	±%
Conservative	Angela Fraser *	2,868	57.3	−3.6
UKIP	Neil Cox	811	16.2	N/A
Liberal Democrats	Judith Sykes	754	15.1	−9.7
BNP	Keith Brown	340	6.8	N/A
Labour	Rick Pendrous	236	4.7	−9.6
Majority		2057	41.1	+5.0
Turnout		5009	N/A	N/A
Conservative hold		Swing	N/A	

Banstead South Division
Party	Candidate	Votes	%	±%
Conservative	Michael Gosling *	2,721	58.9	+2.0
UKIP	Robert Cambridge	1042	22.5	+16.7
Liberal Democrats	Andrew Cressy	642	13.9	−6.7
Labour	John Berge	218	4.7	−9.0
Majority		1679	36.4	+0.1
Turnout		4623	N/A	N/A
Conservative hold		Swing	N/A	

Banstead West Division
Party	Candidate	Votes	%	±%
Nork and Tattenhams Residents Association	Nick Harrison *	2,737	60.9	+9.3
Conservative	Pauline Tweedale	986	22.0	−8.1
UKIP	Elizabeth Parker	412	9.2	N/A
Liberal Democrats	Stephen Gee	230	5.1	−3.5
Labour	Pat Johnson	126	2.8	−6.9
Majority		1751	38.9	+17.4
Turnout		4491	N/A	N/A
Nork and Tattenhams Residents Association hold		Swing	N/A	

Bisley, Chobham & West End Division
Party	Candidate	Votes	%	±%
Conservative	Lavinia Sealy *	2,552	58.7	+1.1
Liberal Democrats	Judy Douch	884	20.3	−22.1
UKIP	Mark Stroud	734	16.9	N/A
Labour	Michael Sheehan	181	4.2	N/A
Majority		1668	38.4	+23.2
Turnout		4351	N/A	N/A
Conservative hold		Swing	N/A	

Bookham & Fetcham West Division
Party	Candidate	Votes	%	±%
Conservative	Clare Curran	2,913	45.1	−7.0
Liberal Democrats	Martin Joseph	2711	42.0	+1.1
UKIP	Julie Langton-Smith	658	10.2	N/A
Labour	Simon Bottomley	180	2.8	−4.3
Majority		202	3.1	−8.1
Turnout		6462	N/A	N/A
Conservative hold		Swing	N/A	

The Byfleets Division
Party	Candidate	Votes	%	±%
Conservative	Geoff Marlow *	2,062	52.9	−0.3
Liberal Democrats	Anne Roberts	1353	34.7	+5.8
UKIP	Marcia Taylor	484	12.4	+8.4
Majority		709	18.2	−6.1
Turnout		3899	N/A	N/A
Conservative hold		Swing	N/A	

Camberley East Division
Party	Candidate	Votes	%	±%
Conservative	William Chapman	2,083	56.3	−1.3
Liberal Democrats	Martin Smith	580	15.7	−11.3
UKIP	Roger Webb	569	15.4	N/A
Labour	Margaret Moher	354	9.6	−5.8
BNP	Lynne Mozar-Lott	113	3.1	N/A
Majority		1503	40.6	+10.0
Turnout		3699	N/A	N/A
Conservative hold		Swing	N/A	

Camberley West Division
Party	Candidate	Votes	%	±%
Conservative	Denis Fuller	2,052	50.5	+5.3
Liberal Democrats	Robert Smith	745	18.3	−11.7
UKIP	Phyllis Harman	635	15.6	N/A
Labour	Rodney Bates	434	10.7	−14.2
Independent	Paul Armstrong	194	4.8	N/A
Majority		1307	32.2	+17.0
Turnout		4060	N/A	N/A
Conservative hold		Swing	N/A	
