= Brian Parker (politician) =

English far-right politician (born 1951/52)

Member of Pendle Borough Council
- In office 4 May 2006 – 3 May 2018
- Preceded by: Dorothy Ormrod
- Succeeded by: Neil McGowan
- Constituency: Marsden

Personal details
- Born: Lancashire, England
- Party: British Democratic (since 2022)
- Other political affiliations: BNP (2006–2022)

Brian Parker (born 1951 or 1952) is an English politician who served as councillor on Pendle Borough Council for the Marsden ward of Nelson, Lancashire, between 2006 and his retirement in 2018. He was the last elected representative of the far-right British National Party (BNP). He is currently a member of the British Democratic Party, and has publicly stated that "I am opposed to all black and brown immigration".

== Career ==
In May 2006, Parker won the seat by 417 votes to 337, from the Labour incumbent Dorothy Ormrod. He was the only one of seven BNP candidates to be elected to the council. He refused to speak to the press after his victory, but BNP leader Nick Griffin expressed his optimism while local councillors from other parties condemned the BNP.

Parker retained his seat in both the 2010 and 2014 borough elections. In the latter election, he defeated the Conservative Neil McGowan by 339 votes to 333.

Parker became the BNP's last councillor at district level or higher from 2015, when Cathy Duffy of Charnwood Borough Council in Leicestershire was defeated. In November 2016, Parker resigned from the party and sat as an independent for one day before returning.

Parker made headlines in March 2017 when local Conservatives alleged that Labour and the Liberal Democrats had struck a deal with him now that the Council was under no overall control; the district's Conservative Member of Parliament Andrew Stephenson accused the two parties of condoning racism. Both other parties denied there was a formal deal with Parker, who stated that he was voting with Labour and Liberal Democrats because he personally preferred their proposals over those of the Conservatives.

Parker contested Pendle's parliamentary seat in the 2017 general election. He earned 718 votes (1.6%) and came fourth of five candidates as Stephenson retained his seat.

In April 2018, Parker announced he would not contest the following month's election because he was caring for his 90-year-old mother Jean. Local politicians from other parties were pleased that the BNP would no longer be present in Pendle. He endorsed Labour candidate Laura Blackburn over McGowan, leading to further allegations of a pact between the two parties; this was denied by local Labour representatives including leader Mohammed Iqbal. Parker's retirement was celebrated by the anti-fascist group Hope not Hate, who released commemorative mugs and teatowels for the occasion. Parker's party called him the "most successful BNP councillor ever".

In 2022, Parker was among many prominent ex-BNP members who joined the British Democratic Party.
