= British Democratic Party (2013) =

British far-right political party

British Democratic Party Plaid Democrataidd Prydeinig (Welsh)
- Abbreviation: BDP; BritDems
- Chairman: James Lewthwaite
- Founded: 9 February 2013; 13 years ago
- Split from: British National Party
- Headquarters: Loughborough, Leicestershire, England
- Membership (2026): ~700
- Ideology: Neo-fascism; British nationalism; Anti-immigration; Anti-Islam; Monarchism
- Political position: Far-right
- Colours: Burgundy

Website
- www.britishdemocrats.org.uk

The British Democratic Party (BDP), commonly known as the British Democrats, is a British far-right political party. It was registered with the Electoral Commission in 2011, and officially launched in 2013 at a Leicestershire village hall by a ten-member steering committee which included former members of several political parties including the British National Party (BNP), Democratic Nationalists, Freedom Party and UK Independence Party (UKIP).

The party's inaugural president was Andrew Brons, then a Member of the European Parliament (MEP). Brons had been a member of the BNP and a leading member of the far-right and fascist National Front (NF). Its current chairman is James Lewthwaite, a former member of the BNP. The steering committee included a number of others with a history of membership in fascist and neo-Nazi groups, who believed that the BNP had been corrupted and watered-down.

== History ==
Andrew Brons resigned from the British National Party (BNP) in October 2012, after narrowly failing in his campaign to unseat Nick Griffin as leader of the party in the 2011 party leadership election.

Although the BDP was registered with the Electoral Commission by 2011, the party was formally established on 9 February 2013 in Leicestershire largely by disillusioned members of the British National Party (BNP) as a “hardline alternative” to the party. The BNP had undergone turmoil in the eighteen months before the split, with 400 BNP members defecting to the English Democrats just a year earlier. The New Statesman reported that security for the party launch was provided by the English Defence League (EDL).

In 2013, Nick Lowles, of Hope Not Hate, believed the party would be a serious threat to the BNP, commenting, “The BDP brings together all of the hardcore Holocaust deniers and racists that have walked away from the BNP over the last two to three years, plus those previously, who could not stomach the party's image changes... They and the BNP already have a mutual hatred of each other and neither party will stop until they've killed the other one off. The gloves will be off and it will be toxic.”

=== Ideology ===
The party is described as being on the far-right of the political spectrum, and having been reported as fascist. The party advocates traditional ideals held on the British right such as opposition to immigration, arguing that citizenship should be acquired via nationality that is inherited from one's descent and not from any legal mechanisms; describing the West as being ensued by Islamisation; and declared that the party is committed to ending all immigration to the United Kingdom, supporting a British withdrawal from the 1951 Refugee Convention, the European Convention on Human Rights (ECHR) and the Global Compact for Migration (GCM). The party also described itself as economically nationalist (including nationalisation of British railways), Eurosceptic, and stated that it supports the monarchy.

== Electoral performance ==
In the 2015 United Kingdom general election, the party nominated one candidate, the BDP chairman, Jim Lewthwaite in Bradford East. He won 210 votes, 0.5% of the total cast.

The party gained a parish councillor in March 2022, when John Robinson, who was elected to Barnham and Eastergate Parish Council in West Sussex as an independent, joined the BDP. In July 2022, Julian Leppert, an elected councillor representing the For Britain Movement on Epping Forest District Council in Essex, joined the BDP. The party gained another parish councillor in August 2022, when Roger Robertson, an elected councillor in Hartley Wintney, Hampshire, joined the British Democrats. He like Leppert was also a former member of the For Britain Movement.

Later that month, BDP candidate Lawrence Rustem was elected unopposed to Detling Parish Council in Kent, in what was the party's first ever election victory. In October 2022, the BDP candidate, Christopher Bateman, was elected to Noak Bridge Parish Council in Basildon, Essex, with 74% of the vote against one other candidate who was an independent.

The British Democrats, whose campaign received support from the far-right hate group Patriotic Alternative, stood five candidates in the 2023 local elections. All candidates failed to win their contests, with Julian Leppert losing the party's only seat above parish council level.

In March 2024, British Democrat candidate Ken Perrin won a by-election to a seat on the Chatteris town council in Cambridgeshire with 47% of the vote. Perrin had previously worked as the North East Cambridgeshire organiser for the UK Independence Party.

The party stood four parliamentary candidates in the 2024 general election: Christopher Bateman in Basildon and Billericay, Gary Butler in Maidstone and Malling, Frank Calladine in Doncaster North, and Lawrence Rustem in Faversham and Mid Kent. Together they received 1,860 votes.

Year	No. of candidates	No. of MPs	% vote	Total votes	Change (% points)	Average votes per candidate
2015	1	0	0.0	210		
2024	4	0	0.0	1,860	+0.0	465

In 2025, British Democrat candidate Peter Lawrence was elected to the Mylor council in Cornwall. Meanwhile, former parliamentary candidate Frank Calladine was elected onto two separate parish council seats in Doncaster, representing the Sprotbrough and Cusworth council and the Brodsworth council. Calladine also stood as the British Democrats' candidate for the 2025 Doncaster mayoral election, having previously won 8.1% of the vote as an independent candidate in 2021. Later that month, British Democrat candidate Lawrence Rustem won a parish council by-election in Maidstone, Kent with 54.5% of the vote.

In 2026, Kai Stephens was the British Democratic Party candidate in the 2026 Clacton by-election, and received 132 votes (0.38% of the vote), and lost his £500 deposit.

== Notable members ==
A number of disillusioned British National Party members joined Andrew Brons in the BDP split with the BNP, including Kevin Scott, founder and director of Civil Liberty and former party organiser for the BNP in the North East. Other notable members of the party include:

- John Bean, (died 2021) the former editor of BNP magazine Identity
- Brian Parker, the last elected representative of the BNP
- Derek Beackon, a former National Front member and the first ever electoral success of the BNP
