= Ros Jones =

Mayor of Doncaster, England (born 1949)

Mayor Ros Jones CBE
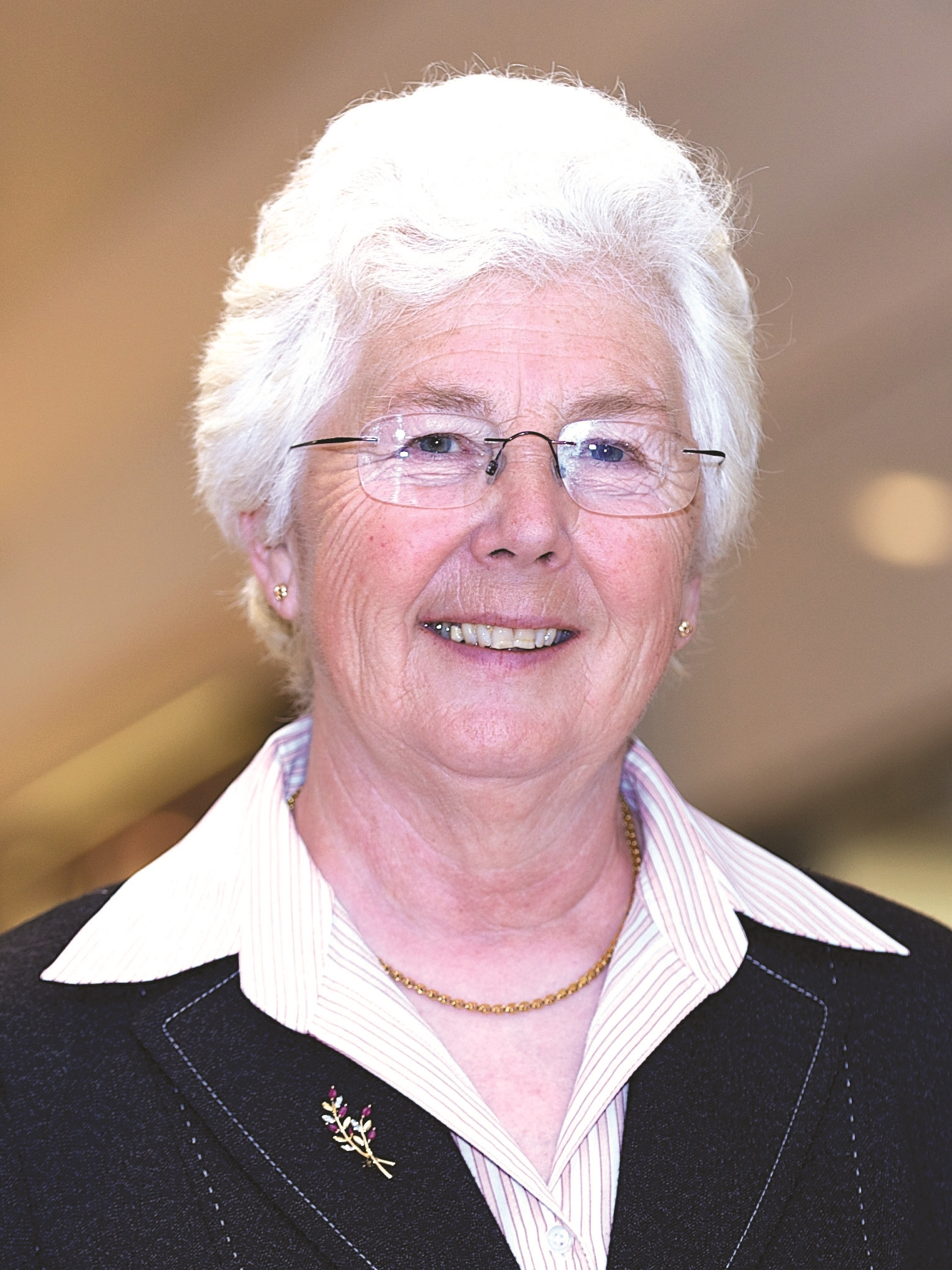
- Official portrait, c. 2025

Mayor of Doncaster
- Incumbent
- Assumed office 6 May 2013
- Preceded by: Peter Davies

Personal details
- Born: Roselyn Christine Jones; 20 December 1949 (age 76) Askern, West Riding of Yorkshire, England
- Party: Labour

Roselyn Christine Jones CBE (born 20 December 1949) is a Labour Party politician who was first elected in 2013 as the Mayor of Doncaster, England.

== Early life ==
Her father worked at Askern Main Colliery, seven miles (11 km) north of Doncaster. She was born Roselyn Cavnor to Edward (Eddy) Cavnor and Mary (Betty) Hunt. She has an older sister, three younger sisters, and a younger brother. She attended the Percy Jackson Grammar School, 1961 entrant.

== Career ==
Jones served as Civic mayor of Doncaster in 2009–10.

Jones was appointed Commander of the Order of the British Empire (CBE) in the 2017 New Year Honours for services to local government.

In the 2018 World Mayor prize, Jones came runner up.

Jones retained her Mayor of Doncaster position in the election of 2021. In the 2025 Doncaster mayoral election, she narrowly won re-election by 698 votes over the Reform UK candidate. After winning she criticised the government of Keir Starmer.

== Personal life ==
Jones lives in Norton, Doncaster. She is the widow of Alan Jones, who was a Labour councillor for Norton and Askern until his death in August 2016. They married in 1977 in Doncaster and have a daughter born in October 1985.

Civic offices
Preceded by Peter Davies	Mayor of Doncaster; May 2013 – present	Incumbent
