= 2009 Bedford Borough Council election =

English local election

Results of the 2009 Bedford Borough Council election

Elections to Bedford Borough Council were held on 4 June 2009 as part of the 2009 United Kingdom local elections. This was the first election in the Borough of Bedford to the newly formed unitary authority council, with all 37 seats being up for election, elected in wards that matched the previous electoral wards of Bedford Borough Council. However, whilst single-member wards retained their councillors, two-member wards were reduced to one member, and three-member wards to two members.

== Results summary ==
2009 Bedford Borough Council election
Party	Seats
Liberal Democrats	13
Conservative Party	9
Labour Party	7
Independents	7

== Ward results ==
=== Brickhill ===
Prior to the election, Brickhill had 2 Conservative councillors and 1 Liberal Democrat councillor.

Brickhill (2)
Party	Candidate	Votes	%	±%
Liberal Democrats	Charles Royden*	1,755	53.1	
Liberal Democrats	Wendy Rider	1,576	47.7	
Conservative	John Keech	1,065	32.2	
Conservative	Barry Monk	912	27.6	
UKIP	Nigel Haughton	393	11.9	
Labour	Hazel Mitchell	236	7.1	
Labour	Brian Anderson	230	7.0	
Turnout		3,307	50.5	
Liberal Democrats hold		Swing		
Liberal Democrats gain from Conservative		Swing		

=== Bromham ===
Prior to the election, Bromham had 3 Conservative councillors.

Bromham (2)
Party	Candidate	Votes	%	±%
Conservative	Roger Rigby*	1,717	63.1	
Conservative	Roger Jones	1,513	55.6	
Independent	Jim Weir	635	23.3	
Liberal Democrats	Stelios Mores	450	16.5	
Liberal Democrats	Stephen Rutherford	283	10.4	
Labour	Nicholas Luder	281	10.3	
Labour	John Dawson	210	7.7	
Turnout		2,721	44.2	
Conservative hold		Swing		
Conservative hold		Swing		

=== Carlton ===
Prior to the election, Carlton had 1 Independent councillor. Changes are shown from 2007.

Carlton (1)
Party	Candidate	Votes	%	±%
Independent	Jim Brandon*	759	58.3	−5.1
Conservative	Nigel Sparrow	347	26.6	+2.7
Liberal Democrats	Hilary Ryan	128	9.8	+1.7
Labour	Stephen Poole	69	5.3	+0.6
Turnout		1,303	54.8	
Independent hold		Swing		

=== Castle ===
Prior to the election, Castle had 3 Independent councillors (2 of whom had been elected as Better Bedford Party candidates).

Castle (2)
Party	Candidate	Votes	%	±%
Independent	Apu Bagchi*	1,058	41.1	
Independent	Margaret Davey*	976	37.9	
Conservative	David Fletcher	661	25.7	
Conservative	Andrew McConnell	564	21.9	
Green	Lucy Bywater	386	15.0	
Labour	Chris Lowe	382	14.9	
Labour	Laurie Evans	331	12.9	
Liberal Democrats	Janet Trengrove	201	7.8	
Liberal Democrats	Johana Woodruff	163	6.3	
Turnout		2,572	40.7	
Independent hold		Swing		
Independent hold		Swing		

=== Cauldwell ===
Prior to the election, Cauldwell had 2 Labour councillors and 1 Independent councillor (who had been elected as a Labour candidate).

Cauldwell (2)
Party	Candidate	Votes	%	±%
Labour	Randolph Charles*	803	34.8	
Labour	Sue Oliver	710	30.7	
Conservative	Kitty Sams	656	28.4	
Liberal Democrats	Michael Bonito	611	26.5	
Liberal Democrats	Andrew Gerard	593	25.7	
Conservative	Oliver Richbell	530	23.0	
Independent	Bob Elford*	186	8.1	
Green	Boss Bentham	184	8.0	
Turnout		2,309	36.0	
Labour hold		Swing		
Labour hold		Swing		

=== Clapham ===
Prior to the election, Clapham had 1 Conservative councillor and 1 Independent councillor.

Clapham (1)
Party	Candidate	Votes	%	±%
Conservative	Jane Walker	1,014	52.9	
Liberal Democrats	Simon Hart	335	17.5	
BNP	Robin Johnstone	299	15.6	
Labour	Jennifer Jackson	270	14.1	
Turnout		1,918	40.8	
Conservative hold		Swing		

=== De Parys ===
Prior to the election, De Parys had 1 Conservative councillor and 1 Liberal Democrat councillor.

De Parys
Party	Candidate	Votes	%	±%
Liberal Democrats	David Sawyer*	957	56.2	
Conservative	Robert Rigby**	574	33.7	
Labour	Frank McMahon	173	10.2	
Turnout		1,704	37.0	
Liberal Democrats hold		Swing		

Robert Rigby was a sitting councillor in Bromham ward.

=== Eastcotts ===
Prior to the election, Eastcotts had 1 Liberal Democrat councillor. Changes are shown from 2004.

Eastcotts
Party	Candidate	Votes	%	±%
Liberal Democrats	Sarah Holland	599	60.3	−1.2
Conservative	Colin Crane	333	33.5	+4.6
Labour	Catherine Moorhouse	61	6.1	+1.0
Turnout		993	41.0	
Liberal Democrats hold		Swing		

=== Goldington ===
Prior to the election, Goldington had 3 Liberal Democrat councillors.

Goldington
Party	Candidate	Votes	%	±%
Liberal Democrats	Sylvia Gillard	1,107	49.0	
Liberal Democrats	Phil Merryman*	1,049	46.4	
Conservative	Gillian Rose	715	31.6	
Conservative	Paul Stonebridge	682	30.2	
Labour	Rosemary Roome	299	13.2	
Labour	Franca Garrick	290	12.8	
Turnout		2,261	35.2	
Liberal Democrats hold		Swing		
Liberal Democrats hold		Swing		

=== Great Barford ===
Prior to the election, Great Barford had 1 Conservative councillor and 1 Independent councillor (who had been elected as a Conservative candidate).

Great Barford
Party	Candidate	Votes	%	±%
Conservative	Carole Ellis*	1,202	53.3	
Independent	Robert Harrison*	686	30.4	
Liberal Democrats	Paul Stekelis	233	10.3	
Labour	Anne Saunders	136	6.0	
Turnout		2,257	47.9	
Conservative hold		Swing		

=== Harpur ===
Prior to the election, Harpur had 2 Labour councillors and 1 Conservative councillor.

Harpur
Party	Candidate	Votes	%	±%
Labour	Colleen Atkins*	1,065	45.4	
Conservative	Brian Dillingham*	921	39.2	
Conservative	Mohammed Kabir	819	34.9	
Labour	Elizabeth Luder	697	29.7	
Liberal Democrats	Rosemary Bootiman	260	11.1	
Green	Ben Foley	253	10.8	
Liberal Democrats	John Ryan	203	8.6	
Green	David Maxwell	177	7.5	
Turnout		2,347	40.1	
Labour hold		Swing		
Conservative hold		Swing		

=== Harrold ===
Prior to the election, Harrold had 1 Liberal Democrat councillor. Changes are shown from 2006.

Harrold
Party	Candidate	Votes	%	±%
Liberal Democrats	Nick Charsley*	748	55.7	+10.8
Conservative	Tricia Storer	549	40.9	+1.3
Labour	Roger Jackson	46	3.4	+0.5
Turnout		1,343	53.8	
Liberal Democrats hold		Swing		

=== Kempston East ===
Prior to the election, Kempston East had 1 Conservative councillor and 1 Labour councillor.

Kempston East
Party	Candidate	Votes	%	±%
Conservative	Nicky Attenborough*	739	48.9	
Labour	Kay Burley	540	35.8	
Liberal Democrats	Neal Bath	231	15.3	
Turnout		1,510	33.7	
Conservative hold		Swing		

=== Kempston North ===
Prior to the election, Kempston North had 2 Labour councillors.

Kempston North
Party	Candidate	Votes	%	±%
Labour	Ray Oliver*	641	43.2	
Conservative	Martin Quince	618	41.6	
Liberal Democrats	Stephen Lawson	225	15.2	
Turnout		1,484	36.6	
Labour hold		Swing		

=== Kempston South ===
Prior to the election, Kempston South had 2 Labour councillors and 1 Conservative councillor.

Kempston South
Party	Candidate	Votes	%	±%
Labour	Carl Meader*	1,271	55.8	
Labour	Will Hunt*	1,099	48.3	
Conservative	Steven Collins	758	33.3	
Conservative	Michele Collins	723	31.8	
Liberal Democrats	Michael Murphy	235	10.3	
Liberal Democrats	Jeannette Goauder	184	8.1	
Turnout		2,277	40.2	
Labour hold		Swing		
Labour hold		Swing		

=== Kingsbrook ===
Prior to the election, Kingsbrook had 3 Liberal Democrat councillors.

Kingsbrook
Party	Candidate	Votes	%	±%
Liberal Democrats	Dave Hodgson*	866	43.9	
Liberal Democrats	Anita Gerard*	861	43.6	
Labour	Margaret Badley	452	22.9	
Labour	James Saunders	412	20.9	
Conservative	Catherine Dale	381	19.3	
Conservative	Lewis Williams	293	14.8	
Green	Paul Taylor	173	8.8	
Green	Tony Upton	170	8.6	
Turnout		1,974	29.3	
Liberal Democrats hold		Swing		
Liberal Democrats hold		Swing		

=== Newnham ===
Prior to the election, Newnham had 1 Conservative councillor and 1 Liberal Democrat councillor.

Newnham
Party	Candidate	Votes	%	±%
Conservative	John Mingay*	638	38.0	
Liberal Democrats	Lynda Aylett-Green	478	28.4	
Independent	Ray Hostler	378	22.5	
Labour	Richard Crane	187	11.1	
Turnout		1,681	41.6	
Conservative hold		Swing		

=== Oakley ===
Prior to the election, Oakley had 1 Independent councillor. Changes are shown from 2006.

Oakley
Party	Candidate	Votes	%	±%
Independent	Pat Olney*	597	67.2	−20.2
Conservative	Mollie Foster**	220	24.7	N/A
Liberal Democrats	Michael McGowran	40	4.5	−3.5
Labour	Terence Carroll	32	3.6	−1.0
Turnout		889	47.4	
Independent hold		Swing		

Mollie Foster was a sitting councillor for Clapham ward (elected as an independent).

=== Putnoe ===
Prior to the election, Putnoe had 2 Liberal Democrat councillors and 1 Independent councillor (who had been elected as a Liberal Democrat candidate).

Putnoe
Party	Candidate	Votes	%	±%
Liberal Democrats	Michael Headley*	1,804	54.3	
Liberal Democrats	Salyanne Smith*	1,524	45.9	
Conservative	Robert Hamilton	905	27.2	
Conservative	Averil Watson	815	24.5	
UKIP	Mark Adkin	482	14.5	
Independent	Myrtle Stewardson*	282	8.5	
Labour	David Lukes	226	6.8	
Labour	Alan Neate	196	5.9	
Turnout		3,323	50.9	
Liberal Democrats hold		Swing		
Liberal Democrats hold		Swing		

=== Queen's Park ===
Prior to the election, Queen's Park had 2 Labour councillors.

Queen's Park
Party	Candidate	Votes	%	±%
Labour	Mohammed Yasin*	1,698	55.0	
Conservative	Parvez Akhtar	1,144	37.1	
Green	Justina McLennan	125	4.1	
Liberal Democrats	Richard Struck	119	3.9	
Turnout		3,086	54.3	
Labour hold		Swing		

=== Riseley ===
Prior to the election, Riseley had 1 Independent councillor. Changes are shown from 2006.

Riseley
Party	Candidate	Votes	%	±%
Independent	Ian Clifton*	952	73.1	−12.3
Conservative	Freya Morgan	249	19.1	N/A
Liberal Democrats	Benjamin Clackson	53	4.1	+0.3
Labour	Paddy Pollard	49	3.8	+0.3
Turnout		1,303	59.3	
Independent hold		Swing		

=== Roxton ===
Prior to the election, Roxton had 1 Conservative councillor. Changes are shown from 2007.

Roxton
Party	Candidate	Votes	%	±%
Conservative	Tom Wootton	636	52.3	−21.9
Independent	Veronica Zwetsloot	455	37.4	N/A
Liberal Democrats	Rosalind Birtwistle	80	6.6	−4.6
Labour	Alistair Strathern	44	3.6	−4.3
Turnout		1,215	51.9	
Conservative hold		Swing		

=== Sharnbrook ===
Prior to the election, Sharnbrook had 1 Conservative councillor. Changes are shown from 2007.

Sharnbrook
Party	Candidate	Votes	%	±%
Independent	Doug McMurdo	752	56.5	+13.4
Conservative	Michael Hurley*	486	36.5	−12.0
Liberal Democrats	Jacqueline Smithson	53	4.0	−0.3
Labour	Christina Holloway	40	3.0	−1.1
Turnout		1,331	57.5	
Independent gain from Conservative		Swing		

=== Turvey ===
Prior to the election, Turvey had 1 Conservative councillor. Changes are shown from 2007.

Turvey
Party	Candidate	Votes	%	±%
Conservative	Mark Smith*	672	67.9	−1.9
Liberal Democrats	Gordon Willey	233	23.5	+11.1
Labour	Roger Barson	85	8.6	−0.4
Turnout		990	45.5	
Conservative hold		Swing		

=== Wilshamstead ===
Prior to the election, Wilshamstead had 1 Conservative councillor and 1 Independent councillor (who had been elected as a Conservative candidate).

Wilshamstead
Party	Candidate	Votes	%	±%
Independent	Barry Huckle*	772	46.1	
Conservative	Lynne Faulkner*	619	37.0	
Labour	Charles Baily	153	9.1	
Liberal Democrats	Conrad Longmore	131	7.8	
Turnout		1,675	39.9	
Independent gain from Conservative		Swing		

=== Wootton ===
Prior to the election, Wootton had 2 Liberal Democrat councillors and 1 Conservative councillor.

Wootton
Party	Candidate	Votes	%	±%
Liberal Democrats	Judith Cunningham*	919	47.5	
Liberal Democrats	Tim Hill*	770	39.8	
Conservative	John Wheeler	394	20.4	
UKIP	Bill Hall	360	18.6	
UKIP	Robert Colman	352	18.2	
Conservative	Zahida Demetri	302	15.6	
Independent	Paul Prescod	255	13.2	
Labour	Adrien Beardmore	87	4.5	
Labour	Tammy Lowe	66	3.4	
Turnout		1,935	46.0	
Liberal Democrats hold		Swing		
Liberal Democrats hold		Swing		
