= Peter Davies (politician) =

English politician

Mayor of Doncaster
- In office 8 June 2009 – 5 May 2013
- Preceded by: Martin Winter
- Succeeded by: Ros Jones

Personal details
- Born: 1948 (age 77–78) Woodlands, England
- Party: Independent (since 2013); English Democrats (2004–2013); UK Reform (1998–2004); UKIP (1993–1998); Conservative (1973–1993); Labour (until 1973)
- Children: Philip Davies

Peter Davies (born 1948) is an English politician who was the Mayor of Doncaster from 2009 to 2013. He was initially elected for the English Democrats, but announced his resignation from the party on 5 February 2013 citing "a big influx of new members joining from the British National Party". He subsequently lost narrowly the 2013 election to Labour's Ros Jones.

== Personal life ==
Born in Woodlands on the outskirts of Doncaster in 1948, Davies went to school in Thorne, then worked at Danum School as a teacher. He is married. He is also the Chairman of Sykehouse Cricket Club and a member of the Campaign for Real Education and the Campaign Against Political Correctness. Davies is the father of Philip Davies, the former Conservative MP for Shipley.

== Political career ==
Davies was a member of the Labour Party until 1973 when he joined the Conservatives. He remained in the Conservative Party until Prime Minister John Major signed the Maastricht Treaty in 1993.

=== United Kingdom Independence Party ===
Davies then joined the strongly eurosceptic United Kingdom Independence Party (UKIP). He contested Yorkshire South at the European Parliament election in 1994, taking 2.6% of the votes cast. Two years later he contested the 1996 Hemsworth by-election, finishing with 2.1% of the vote and coming sixth of ten candidates. He contested Doncaster Central at the 1997 general election, getting 462 votes. The following year, in 1998, a by-election arose in the Yorkshire South European constituency and Davies stood again, against the wishes of the then UKIP party leader Michael Holmes but with the support of Nigel Farage and John Whittaker, who put up his deposit. Davies came last in the poll, but saved his deposit, increasing his share of the vote to 11.6%.

=== English Democrats ===
Davies left UKIP and joined a UKIP splinter group UK Reform. UK Reform then merged with the English Democrats which meant that Peter Davies joined the English Democrats by default, he was shortly afterwards given the title Chairman of the South Yorkshire branch of the English Democrats. He stood in Doncaster's Finningley ward in the 2008 local elections, achieving second place with 1,033 votes, over 20% of the vote and stood in both the European elections and the Doncaster mayoral election in June 2009. He was placed fourth on English Democrats' party list for Yorkshire and the Humber, a list that achieved 2.6% of the vote. In the mayoral race, Davies took second place in the first round of voting, but won by around 400 votes once second preferences had been taken into account.

=== Mayor of Doncaster ===
Davies' mayoral campaign had called for harsher punishments for "young thugs", withdrawal from the European Union, withdrawal of council translation services, a reduction in the number of Doncaster councillors, and for local schools to opt out of local authority control. Once elected, Davies was interviewed on BBC Radio Sheffield and Look North where the interviewers questioned the legality and achievability of his manifesto promises.

One of Davies' first decisions was to announce a cut in his own annual salary from £73,000 to £30,000. He is an opponent of political correctness who pledged to stop funding the town's gay pride event, although organisers maintained that the event brought business to Doncaster. Later, he confirmed the event for 2009 would be funded as arranged before his election. He has also pledged to end and reverse town twinning as a waste of money, joking that he would use his two words of German to tell a visiting delegation Auf Wiedersehen (goodbye). He also insists he is "not conned by global warming" and has described climate change as "a scam".

==== Vote of no confidence ====
On 22 February 2010, Davies' proposals for a three per cent council tax cut were opposed and a vote of no confidence against him was carried. Doncaster Council criticised the leadership of Davies and his cabinet, and described his proposed 2010–11 budget as "irresponsible". Davies declined to resign.

On 2 June 2010, the government appointed a new chief executive and three commissioners to lead the council. Communities Secretary Eric Pickles said the measures were needed to turn the council around "after 15 years of poor governance and dysfunctional politics".

In October 2010, Davies was disciplined by the council for breaching the code of conduct by failing to declare his membership of the Campaign Against Political Correctness.

In February 2013 it was reported that Davies had left the English Democrats and would run as an independent in the 2013 Doncaster mayoral elections. In May, Davies lost narrowly to the Labour candidate, Ros Jones.

== Incidents and statements ==
Davies attracted widespread media attention during his period in office, with a series of contentious announcements.

=== "Praise" for the Taliban ===
Speaking in September 2009, Davies' conservative approach to family values was unequivocal as he spoke of his admiration for the "ordered way of life under the Taliban."

"The one thing to be said about the Taliban is that they do have an ordered society of some sort and that they don't have hundreds of cases of children under threat of abuse from violent parents, as we have in Doncaster."

— Peter Davies, September 2009

Davies made it clear it was the moral code he was an admirer of while detesting the Taliban themselves, adding, "The point I was making was that even a regime as hideous as the Taliban at least appear to have sort of decent sort of family affairs. In fact probably...they have an ordered society." He continued: "We in this country have created mayhem through lax social policies of disregard for marriage and the family and we have created mayhem in society."

=== Child protection services in Doncaster ===
After an incident in which two young boys living in Council care were given indeterminate sentences for the torture of two other children, an Audit Commission report stated that: “Those leading the council – the mayor and cabinet, some councillors and some officers – do not collectively have the capacity or capability to make the necessary improvements in governance.” Davies responded that he thought it “a very black report without any shade of colour at all and painted the town as a dreadful hole that no one would ever want to come to or live in and that is not Doncaster”, adding, "The town has been languishing in the doldrums under Labour rule and it's time that it made use of its huge advantages."

=== Library closures ===
Davies has been criticised by Doncaster residents after admitting that he had never borrowed a book from a public library and walking out of a public meeting convened to discuss the proposed closure of a local library, a branch that Davies admitted to having never seen.

== Elections contested ==
Election	Constituency	Party	Votes	Percentage of votes	Source(s)
1994 European election	Yorkshire South	UKIP	3,948	2.6	
1996 Parliamentary by-election	Hemsworth	UKIP	455	2.1	
1997 general election	Doncaster Central	UKIP	462	1.1	
1998 European by-election	Yorkshire South	UKIP	13,830	11.6	
2006 Doncaster Council local election	Finningley Ward	ED	973	21.2	
2007 Doncaster Council local election	Finningley Ward	ED	1,111	23.8	
2008 Doncaster Council local election	Finningley Ward	ED	1,003	21.6	
2009 European election	Yorkshire and the Humber	ED	31,287	2.6	
2009 Doncaster mayoral election	Doncaster	ED	24,725 (both first and second preference votes)	22.6 (of first preference votes) 51.7 (of second preference votes)	
2013 Doncaster mayoral election	Doncaster	Independent	25,344 (both first and second preference votes)	34.9 (of first preference votes) 49.4 (of second preference votes)	

Political offices
Preceded by Martin Winter	Mayor of Doncaster; 2009–2013	Succeeded by Ros Jones
