= 2009 Dorset County Council election =

2009 UK local government election

- 4 June 2009

All 45 seats of Dorset County Council 23 seats needed for a majority
	First party	Second party	Third party
Party	Conservative	Liberal Democrats	Independent
Last election	24 seats, 44.3%	16 seats, 39.7%	1 seat, 2.0%
Seats before	24	16	1
Seats won	28	16	1
Seat change	▲4	Steady	Steady
Popular vote	76,357	55,733	1,479
Percentage	48.8%	35.6%	1.0%
- Map of the results of the 2009 Dorset council election.
Council control before election
Conservative
Council control after election
Conservative

Elections to Dorset County Council took place on 4 June 2009. The vote was delayed from 7 May, in order to coincide with elections to the European Parliament. A key issue in the election was an Audit Commission report on social care which reported a decline in standards since 2006, however the Conservative party responded that their administration was the best performing county council in England. There were fears however that voter turnout would be a record low.

== Election result summary ==
Dorset County Council election, 2009
Party	Seats	Gains	Losses	Net gain/loss	Seats %	Votes %	Votes	+/−
Conservative	28	6	2	▲4	62.22	48.76	76,357	
Liberal Democrats	16	3	3	Steady	35.56	35.59	55,733	
Independent	1	0	0	Steady	2.22	0.94	1,479	
UKIP	0	0	0	Steady	0	7.35	11,505	
Labour	0	0	4	▼4	0	6.00	9,399	
Green	0	0	0	Steady	0	0.95	1,488	
Citizen's Action Party	0	0	0	Steady	0	0.49	781	
BNP	0	0	0	Steady	0	0.1	150	

== Election result by division ==
Results by district by ward:

=== Christchurch ===
==== Burton Grange ====
Burton Grange
Party	Candidate	Votes	%
Conservative	David Charles Jones	1,102	43.54
Liberal Democrats	Betty-Ann Fox-Hodges	676	26.71
UKIP	Simon Peter Boyd	453	17.90
BNP	Barry John Sinclair Bennett	150	5.93
Labour	Vera Elizabeth Hill	150	5.93
Turnout			36.66
Conservative gain from Liberal Democrats			

==== Christchurch Central ====
Christchurch Central
Party	Candidate	Votes	%
Liberal Democrats	Peter Roger Alexander Hall	1,438	40.84
Conservative	Ray Nottage	1,345	38.20
UKIP	Rollo Reid	604	17.15
Labour	Michael Edward Woods	134	3.81
Turnout			44.59
Liberal Democrats hold			

==== Commons ====
Commons
Party	Candidate	Votes	%
Conservative	David John Fox	1,514	45.40
UKIP	Ric Johnson	981	29.42
Liberal Democrats	John Blunden	644	19.31
Labour	Robert William Ian Deeks	196	5.88
Turnout			40.2
Conservative hold			

==== Highcliffe and Walkford ====
Highcliffe and Walkford
Party	Candidate	Votes	%
Conservative	Colin Peter Jamieson	1,833	51.66
UKIP	Philip Glover	887	25
Liberal Democrats	Jonathan Christopher Stephen Foster	615	17.33
Labour	Rob Maskell	213	6
Turnout			46.27
Conservative hold			

==== Mudeford and Highcliffe ====
Mudeford and Highcliffe
Party	Candidate	Votes	%
Conservative	Alan John Charles Griffiths	2,356	60.15
UKIP	Brian Hogger	642	16.39
Liberal Democrats	John Campbell	487	12.43
Labour	Carol Ann Wilcox	254	6.48
Independent	Lindsay Margaret Turner	178	4.54
Turnout			51.57
Conservative hold			

=== East Dorset ===
==== Colehill and Stapehill ====
Colehill and Stapehill
Party	Candidate	Votes	%
Liberal Democrats	Janet Dover	1,486	41.81
Conservative	David Packer	1,429	40.21
UKIP	John Richard Myers	539	15.17
Labour	Kay Susanne Wilcox	100	2.81
Turnout			46.81
Liberal Democrats hold			

==== Corfe Mullen ====
Corfe Mullen
Party	Candidate	Votes	%
Liberal Democrats	Susan Jefferies	1,453	42.66
Conservative	Brian Lane	1,399	41.07
UKIP	Josephine Marie Evans	554	16.27
Turnout			42.32
Liberal Democrats hold			

==== Cranborne Chase ====
Cranborne Chase
Party	Candidate	Votes	%
Conservative	Timothy John Palmer	2,178	71.62
Liberal Democrats	David Lawrence Tooke	863	28.38
Turnout			44.32
Conservative hold			

==== Ferndown ====
Ferndown (2 seats)
Party	Candidate	Votes	%
Conservative	John Leslie Wilson	3,575	28.24
Conservative	Derek Bidkar Frank Burt	3,460	27.33
UKIP	David Leigh Baxter	1,780	14.06
UKIP	John Lees Baxter	1,691	13.36
Liberal Democrats	Margaret Martin	913	7.21
Liberal Democrats	Phillip Graeme Cuckstone	873	6.90
Labour	Christopher Hampton	368	2.91
Turnout			42.76
Conservative hold			
Conservative hold			

==== Minster ====
Minster
Party	Candidate	Votes	%
Conservative	Robin David Cook	1,594	50.43
Liberal Democrats	Marilyn Blanche Osner	1,567	49.57
Turnout			41.65
Conservative gain from Liberal Democrats			

==== St Leonards & St Ives ====
St Leonards and St Ives
Party	Candidate	Votes	%
Conservative	Peter William Richardson	1,879	63.69
UKIP	Allan Stephen Tallett	627	21.25
Liberal Democrats	Nick Smith	444	15.05
Turnout			49.65
Conservative hold			

==== Verwood & Three Legged Cross ====
Verwood and Three Legged Cross (2 seats)
Party	Candidate	Votes	%
Conservative	Toni Bartley Coombs	2,939	32.39
Conservative	Spencer Grant Flower	2,814	31.01
Liberal Democrats	Alan Stuart Dorey	1,555	17.13
Liberal Democrats	Heidi Maria James	1,506	16.60
Labour	Mike Ellis	261	2.88
Turnout			41.78
Conservative hold			
Conservative hold			

West Moors & Holt

West Moors and Holt
Party	Candidate	Votes	%
Conservative	Peter James Michael Finney	1,623	45.68
Liberal Democrats	Peter Holden	1,268	35.69
UKIP	Dave Butt	662	18.63
Turnout			47.46
Conservative hold			

=== North Dorset ===
==== Blackmore Vale ====
Blackmore Vale
Party	Candidate	Votes	%
Liberal Democrats	David Charles Thomas Fox	1,719	45.79
Conservative	Deborah Anne Croney	1,473	39.24
UKIP	Alan Stewart Kewley	483	12.87
Labour	Dennis Wardleworth	79	2.10
Turnout			47.46
Liberal Democrats hold			

==== Blandford ====
Blandford
Party	Candidate	Votes	%
Liberal Democrats	Barrie George Cooper	1,633	57.06
Conservative	Steve Adamson	1,085	37.91
Labour	Haydn Roger White	144	5.03
Turnout			38.61
Liberal Democrats hold			

==== Gillingham ====
Gillingham
Party	Candidate	Votes	%
Liberal Democrats	David Milsted	1,606	49.04
Conservative	Nick Mason	1,528	46.66
Labour	Terry Joyes	141	4.31
Turnout			42.88
Liberal Democrats hold			

==== Hambledon ====
Hambledon
Party	Candidate	Votes	%
Conservative	Angus Campbell	2,437	65.97
Liberal Democrats	Graeme Henry Hole	1,098	29.72
Labour	Keith Yarwood	159	4.30
Turnout			45.3
Conservative hold			

==== Shaftesbury ====
Shaftesbury
Party	Candidate	Votes	%
Liberal Democrats	Mervyn Jeffrey	1,319	53.60
Conservative	Jane Katherine Gould	1,061	43.11
Labour	Christine Pamela Moss	81	3.29
Turnout			45.79
Liberal Democrats hold			

==== Stour Vale ====
Stour Vale
Party	Candidate	Votes	%
Conservative	Andrew Ronald Cattaway	1,905	59.05
Liberal Democrats	Ian Stewart	1,222	37.88
Labour	David John Harvey	99	3.07
Turnout			45.95
Conservative hold			

==== Winterborne ====
Winterborne
Party	Candidate	Votes	%
Conservative	Hilary Ann Cox	1,822	53.84
Liberal Democrats	Graham Douglas Burton	814	24.05
UKIP	Bob Pilkington	573	16.93
Labour	Kim Fendley	175	5.17
Turnout			44.33
Conservative hold			

=== Purbeck ===
==== Egdon Heath ====
Edgdon Heath
Party	Candidate	Votes	%
Liberal Democrats	Alex Brenton	1,373	46.96
Conservative	Malcolm Leonard Shakesby	1,369	46.82
Labour	David Llewellyn Kelsey Stokes	182	6.22
Turnout			43.72
Liberal Democrats gain from Conservative			

==== Lytchett ====
Lytchett
Party	Candidate	Votes	%
Liberal Democrats	Frederick Henry Drane	1,873	51.15
Conservative	Bill Pipe	1,643	44.87
Labour	James Sebastian Selby Bennett	146	3.99
Turnout			41.45
Liberal Democrats hold			

==== Purbeck Hills ====
Purbeck Hills
Party	Candidate	Votes	%
Conservative	Michael William John Lovell	1,605	59.75
Liberal Democrats	Beryl Rita Ezzard	898	33.43
Labour	Leigh Van de Zande	183	6.81
Turnout			47.92
Conservative hold			

==== Swanage ====
Swanage
Party	Candidate	Votes	%
Conservative	William Stanley Trite	1,507	40.95
Liberal Democrats	Peter B Clark	1,155	31.39
UKIP	Mike Hobson	652	17.72
Labour	Max Stanford	366	9.95
Turnout			45.29
Conservative hold			

==== Wareham ====
Wareham
Party	Candidate	Votes	%
Liberal Democrats	David Anthony Budd	1,535	48.35
Conservative	Jane Thomas	1,172	36.91
UKIP	Keith Allen Simpson	377	11.87
Labour	Rosemary Smith	91	2.87
Turnout			47.23
Liberal Democrats hold			

=== West Dorset ===
==== Beaminster ====
Beaminster
Party	Candidate	Votes	%
Conservative	Rebecca Knox	1,713	51.53
Liberal Democrats	Peter Ivan Jones	1,264	38.03
Green	Neil Antony Judd	280	8.42
Labour	Thomas Anderson	67	2.02
Turnout			49.37
Conservative hold			

==== Bride Valley ====
Bride Valley
Party	Candidate	Votes	%
Conservative	Ronald William Coatsworth	1,730	54.40
Liberal Democrats	Ros Kayes	984	30.94
Independent	Leon Sea	310	9.75
Labour	Anna May Alice Birley	156	4.91
Turnout			47.17
Conservative hold			

==== Bridport ====
Bridport
Party	Candidate	Votes	%
Liberal Democrats	Karl Gareth Wallace	1,205	42.79
Conservative	Sandra Ann Brown	1,096	38.92
Green	Julian Stephen Langton Jones	336	11.93
Labour	Richard Howard Nicholls	176	6.36
Turnout			37.36
Liberal Democrats gain from Conservative			

==== Chickerell and Chesil Bank ====
Chickerell and Chesil Bank
Party	Candidate	Votes	%
Conservative	Ian Charles Gardner	1,178	46.99
Liberal Democrats	Brendan Webster	1,074	42.84
Labour	Steve Bick	255	10.17
Turnout			39.12
Conservative hold			

==== Dorchester ====
Dorchester (2 seats)
Party	Candidate	Votes	%
Liberal Democrats	Richard Martin Biggs	3,085	26.66
Liberal Democrats	David Trevor Jones	3,068	26.52
Conservative	Mary Penfold	2,192	18.95
Conservative	Jonathan Halewood	2,053	17.74
Labour Co-op	Vicki Black	623	5.38
Labour Co-op	Andy Hutchings	549	4.75
Turnout			43.1
Liberal Democrats hold			
Liberal Democrats hold			

==== Linden Lea ====
Linden Lea
Party	Candidate	Votes	%
Conservative	David Crowhurst	1,945	58.13
Liberal Democrats	Tim Harries	1,135	33.92
Labour	Daniel Peter Alec Hassell	266	7.95
Turnout			43.33
Conservative hold			

==== Marshwood Vale ====
Marshwood Vale
Party	Candidate	Votes	%
Conservative	Geoffrey John Brierley	1,749	56.75
Liberal Democrats	Christopher John Savory	1,152	37.38
Labour	Carole Ann Murless	181	5.87
Turnout			41.62
Conservative hold			

==== Sherborne ====
Sherborne
Party	Candidate	Votes	%
Conservative	Robert Andrew Gould	1,639	52.65
Liberal Democrats	Jan Palmer	942	30.26
Green	Susan Greene	374	12.01
Labour	Graham John Parish	158	5.08
Turnout			44.32
Conservative hold			

==== Sherborne Rural ====
Sherborne Rural
Party	Candidate	Votes	%
Conservative	Michael James Bevan	2,080	51.19
Liberal Democrats	Robin Andrew Shane Legg	1,871	46.05
Labour	Kate Parish	112	2.76
Turnout			52.2
Conservative gain from Liberal Democrats			

==== Three Valleys ====
Three Valleys
Party	Candidate	Votes	%
Conservative	Jill Haynes	2,154	57.92
Liberal Democrats	Andrew James Canning	1,302	35.01
Labour	Harry Burden	263	7.07
Turnout			45.91
Conservative hold			

=== Weymouth and Portland ===
==== Broadwey ====
Broadwey
Party	Candidate	Votes	%
Conservative	Andy Cooke	1,381	43.37
Liberal Democrats	Christine James	672	21.11
Labour	Mike Byatt	633	19.88
Green	Brian Anthony Heatley	498	15.64
Turnout			38.04
Conservative gain from Labour			

==== Lodmoor ====
Lodmoor
Party	Candidate	Votes	%
Liberal Democrats	Brian Ellis	1,792	49.10
Conservative	Ian Bruce	1,616	44.27
Labour	Maureen Audrey Drake	242	6.63
Turnout			49.86
Liberal Democrats hold			

==== Portland Harbour ====
Portland Harbour
Party	Candidate	Votes	%
Conservative	Tim Munro	795	32.74
Labour	Anne Kenwood	584	24.05
Liberal Democrats	Trefor Morgan	555	22.86
Citizen's Action Party	Richard Denton-White	494	20.35
Turnout			34.32
Conservative gain from Labour			

==== Portland Tophill ====
Portland Tophill
Party	Candidate	Votes	%
Independent	Les Ames	991	44.56
Conservative	Ian Munro-Price	637	28.64
Labour	Sandy West	309	13.89
Citizen's Action Party	Don Roach	287	12.90
Turnout			33.94
Independent hold			

==== Rodwell ====
Rodwell
Party	Candidate	Votes	%
Conservative	Nigel Reed	1,126	41.53
Liberal Democrats	John Birtwistle	1,019	37.59
Labour	Kate Wheller	566	20.88
Turnout			39.14
Conservative gain from Labour			

==== Westham ====
Westham
Party	Candidate	Votes	%
Liberal Democrats	David Harris	1,336	52.87
Conservative	Ian James	757	29.96
Labour	Mike Owen	434	17.17
Turnout			36.06
Liberal Democrats gain from Labour			

==== Weymouth Town ====
Weymouth Town
Party	Candidate	Votes	%
Liberal Democrats	Howard Legg	1,244	51.55
Conservative	Peter Michael Farrell	869	36.01
Labour	Colin Huckle	300	12.43
Turnout			31.14
Liberal Democrats hold			
