= 2021 Doncaster mayoral election =

Local election in the United Kingdom

- 6 May 2021
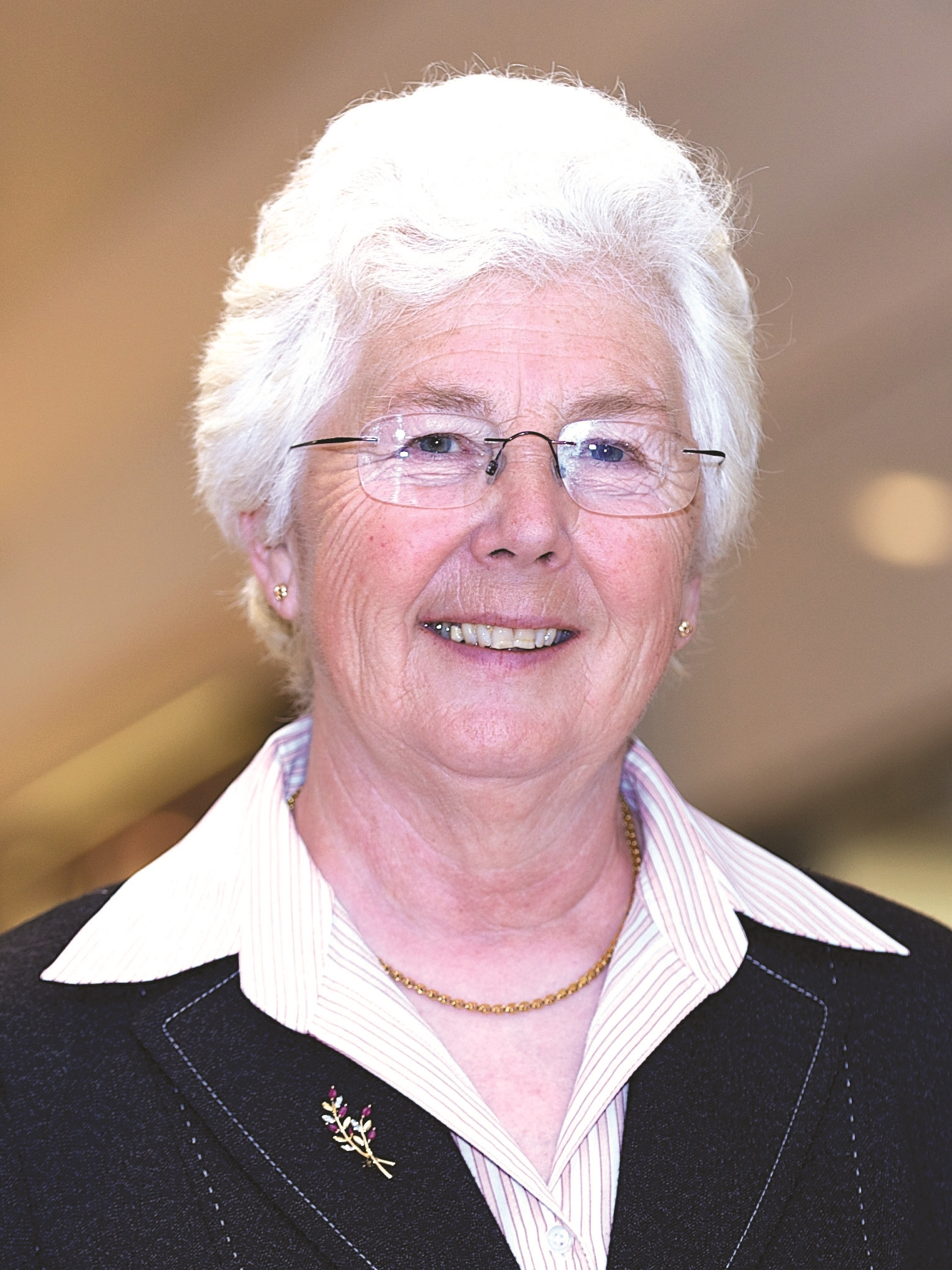
Candidate	Ros Jones	James Hart	Frank Calladine
Party	Labour	Conservative	Independent
Mayor before election
Ros Jones
Labour
Elected mayor
Ros Jones
Labour

The 2021 Doncaster mayoral election was held on 6 May 2021 to elect the mayor of Doncaster. Incumbent Mayor Ros Jones was seeking reelection.

The supplementary vote system was used to elect the mayor for a four-year term of office. Subsequent elections will be held in May 2025 and every four years thereafter. The election was held alongside a full election for the Doncaster Metropolitan Borough Council, and the South Yorkshire Police and Crime Commissioner.

== Election result ==
Doncaster Mayoral Election 6 May 2021
Party	Candidate	1st round		2nd round			1st round votesTransfer votes, 2nd round
Party	Candidate	Total	Of round	Transfers	Total	Of round	1st round votesTransfer votes, 2nd round
Labour	Ros Jones	27,669	43.3%	3,563	31,232	59.8%	
Conservative	James Hart	17,980	28.2%	3,039	21,019	40.2%	
Independent	Frank Calladine	5,166	8.1%				
Yorkshire	Andy Budden	4,073	6.4%				
Independent	Joan Briggs	3,904	6.1%				
Green	Warren Draper	3,370	5.3%				
Reform	Surjit Duhre	1,012	1.6%				
Majority					10,213	19.6%	
Turnout		63,862	28.05%				
Labour hold							
