= Martin Winter (mayor) =

British politician (born 1962)

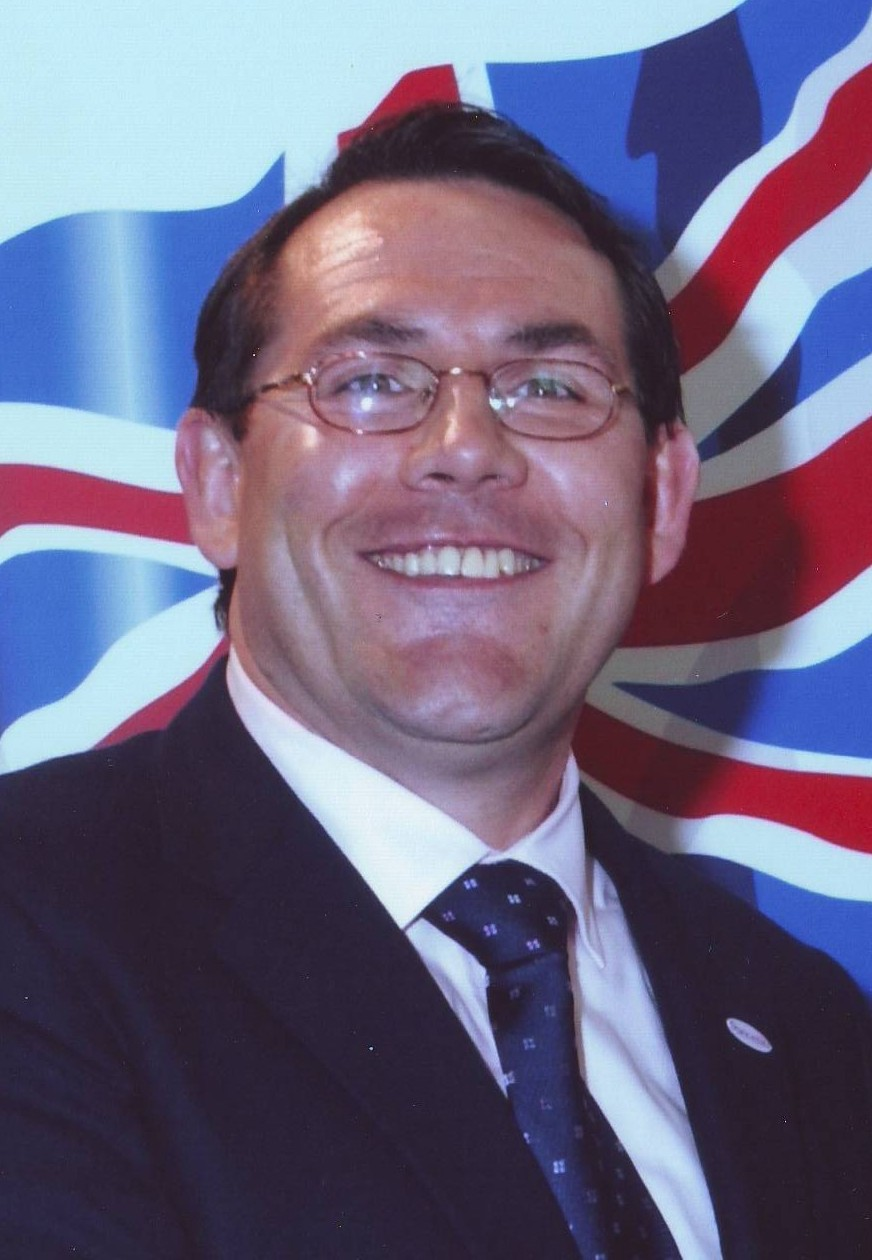
- The first elected Mayor of Doncaster, England

1st Mayor of Doncaster
- In office 6 May 2002 – 7 June 2009
- Preceded by: New Office
- Succeeded by: Peter Davies

Personal details
- Born: 1962 (age 63–64) Doncaster, England
- Party: Independent
- Other political affiliations: Labour (until 2008)
- Website: www.doncaster.gov.uk

Martin Winter is an English politician who was the first directly elected Mayor of Doncaster, England. He was elected in 2002 as the Labour Party candidate and was re-elected in 2005. He completed his final term as an independent after leaving his party.

== Early life ==
Martin Winter was a professional rugby league footballer and the son of a local newsagent proprietor and property developer. He went on to win election to Doncaster Metropolitan Borough Council.

== Career ==
Doncaster became one of the first authorities to adopt the new system for directly elected mayors. In this position, he appointed his own cabinet from among the Councillors.

Winter won re-election in 2005 on the day of the General Election against a split opposition.

After the deaths of seven children in Doncaster, Doncaster council voted that Winter should take responsibility for the failures of the children's service and resign. Winter declared that he would govern as an independent mayor, with the support of two of his cabinet members. The Labour Party gave him an ultimatum to back down. The situation then became further confused as he signalled his intention to remain in the Labour Party, but not in its council group. At the same time, the council was faced with two reports from government inspectors, accusing it of serious failures.

== Resignation ==
In the local election on 1 May 2008, Doncaster Metropolitan Borough Council remained under no overall control. On 29 May 2008, Winter and one other councillor were expelled from the Labour Party. Only the leader of the three-member Community Group and one Liberal Democrat, who was suspended from that party, joined his new cabinet. The members of Doncaster Council supported a motion of no confidence in Mayor Winter on 14 July 2008 by 42 votes to 8 with 7 abstentions. However, Mayor Winter refused to resign and pledged to see out his term of office.

Further calls for Winter's resignation followed in January 2009 after the Authority was deemed to be seriously failing in its delivery of social services following the deaths of seven children that were on the local "At Risk" register. The Social Services Department had been understaffed and overextended for some time, and several leading officers had resigned. Winter has again refused to resign following the loss of another "no-confidence" motion.

In March 2009, Mayor Winter announced he would not be standing for re-election in June 2009. In the June 2009 election, he was replaced by English Democrat Peter Davies. Since leaving politics he has been employed by a Stainforth-based property company.

In April 2015 he published his biography Fall Out – Loved and Trusted... Hated & Abused...: the Memoirs of a Mayor.

== Recent controversy ==
In 2020, Winter plead not guilty to charges of having an out of control animal, when accused of losing control of one of his lurcher dogs in public, leading to one man becoming seriously injured. Once the case went to Magistrate Court, he changed his plea to guilty and was fined £500.

Political offices
Preceded by New Office	Mayor of Doncaster; 2002–2009	Succeeded by Peter Davies
