= Mayor of Doncaster =

Mayor of the City of Doncaster
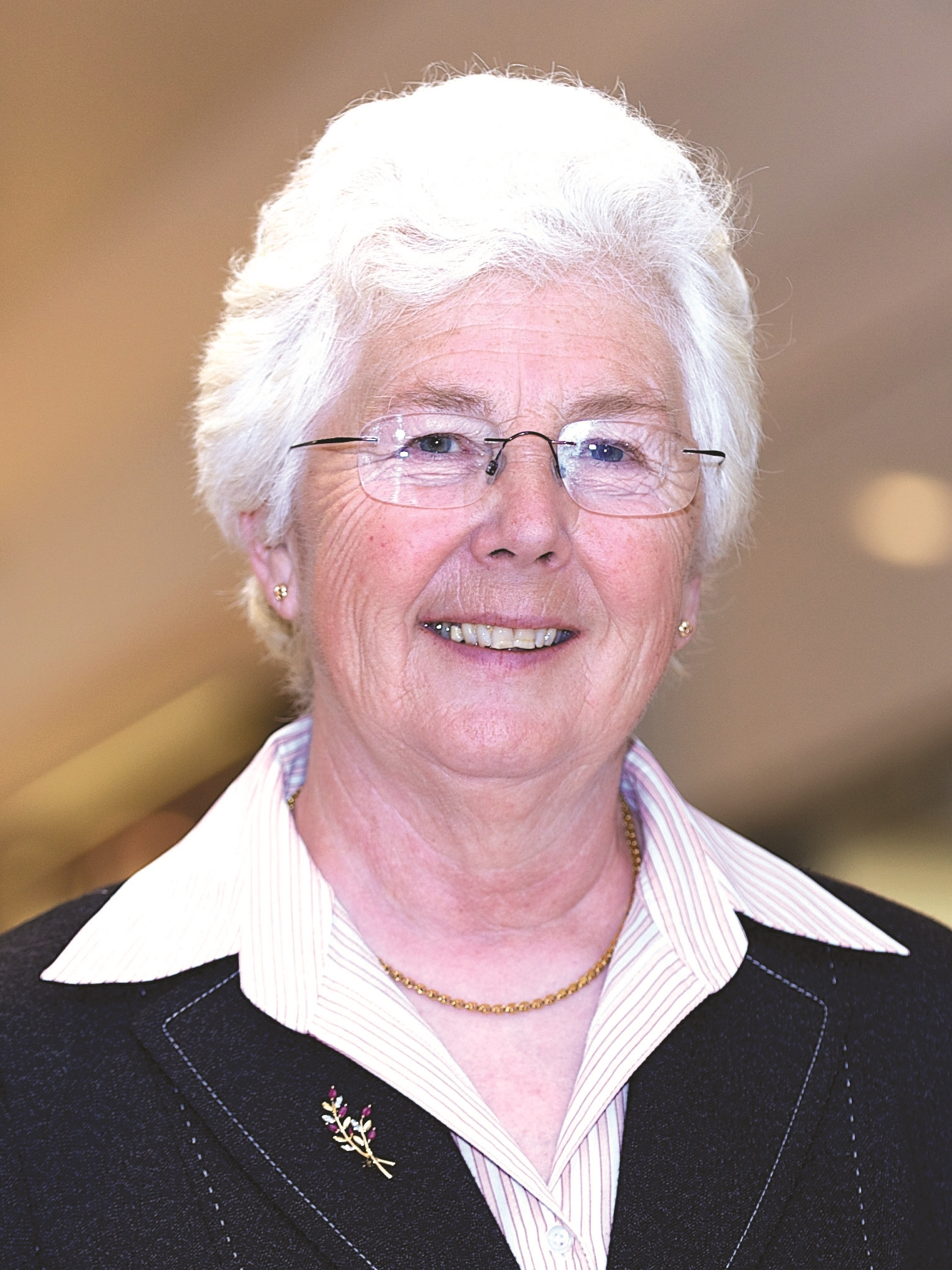
- Incumbent; Ros Jones since 6 May 2013
- Style: No courtesy title or style
- Appointer: Electorate of Doncaster
- Term length: Four years
- Inaugural holder: Martin Winter
- Formation: 6 May 2002
- Salary: £51,449 per year
- Website: https://www.doncaster.gov.uk/mayor/mayor-home

The Mayor of Doncaster is a directly elected local authority mayor, first elected on 2 May 2002, taking on the executive function of City of Doncaster Council. The incumbent mayor is Ros Jones elected as a member of the Labour Party, who won the election held on 2 May 2013. The position is different from the long-existing and largely ceremonial, annually appointed mayors who are now known as the civic mayor of Doncaster.

In May 2012, voters decided in a referendum to keep the position of directly elected mayor.

== List of elected mayors ==
Party	Name	Term of office	
Labour (2002–2008)	Martin Winter	6 May 2002	7 June 2009
Independent (from 29 May 2008)	Martin Winter	6 May 2002	7 June 2009
English Democrats (2009–2013)	Peter Davies	8 June 2009	5 May 2013
Independent (from 5 Feb 2013)	Peter Davies	8 June 2009	5 May 2013
Labour	Ros Jones	6 May 2013	Incumbent

== Elections ==
=== 2025 ===
The seventh mayoral election was held on 1 May 2025. Unlike previous elections, this election did not provide for transfer votes due to the passing of the Elections Act 2022, which mandated that mayoral elections in England should be conducted using first-past-the-post rather than the supplementary vote system.

2025 Doncaster mayoral election
Party	Candidate	Votes	%	±%
Labour	Ros Jones	23,805	32.4	−10.9
Reform	Alexander Jones	23,107	31.5	+29.9
Conservative	Nick Fletcher	18,982	26.0	−2.2
Green	Julie Buckley	2,449	3.3	−2.0
Yorkshire	Andrew Walmsley	1,164	1.6	−4.8
SDP	David Bettney	929	1.3	
Liberal Democrats	Mihai Melenciuc	895	1.2	
British Democrats	Frank Calladine	448	0.6	
Workers Party	Ahsan Jamil	434	0.6	
TUSC	Andy Hiles	393	0.5	
Independent	Richie Vallance	245	0.3	
Independent	Doug Wright	157	0.2	
Majority		698		−19.1
Rejected ballots		398	0.5	
Registered electors		227,496		
Turnout		73,406	32.27	+4.22

=== 2021 ===
The election took place on 6 May 2021.

2021 Doncaster mayoral election
Party	Candidate	1st round		2nd round			1st round votesTransfer votes, 2nd round
Party	Candidate	Total	Of round	Transfers	Total	Of round	1st round votesTransfer votes, 2nd round
Labour	Ros Jones	27,669	43.3%	3,563	31,232	59.8	
Conservative	James Hart	17,980	28.2%	3,039	21,019	40.2	
Independent	Frank Calladine	5,166	8.1%				
Yorkshire	Andy Budden	4,073	6.4%				
Independent	Joan Briggs	3,904	6.1%				
Green	Warren Draper	3,370	5.3%				
Reform	Surjit Duhre	1,012	1.6%				
Majority					10,213	19.6%	
Turnout		63,862	28.05%				
Labour hold							

=== 2017 ===
The fifth mayoral election took place on 4 May 2017.

2017 Doncaster mayoral election
Party	Candidate	1st round		2nd round			1st round votesTransfer votes, 2nd round
Party	Candidate	Total	Of round	Transfers	Total	Of round	1st round votesTransfer votes, 2nd round
Labour	Ros Jones	32,631	50.9%				
Conservative	George Jabbour	13,575	21.2%				
UKIP	Brian Whitmore	7,764	12.1%				
Independent	Eddie Todd	5,344	8.3%				
Yorkshire	Chris Whitwood	3,235	5.0%				
TUSC	Steve Williams	1,531	2.4%				
Majority							
Turnout		64,080	29.35				
Labour hold							

=== 2013 ===
The fourth mayoral election took place on 2 May 2013.

2013 Doncaster mayoral election
Party	Candidate	1st round		2nd round			1st round votesTransfer votes, 2nd round
Party	Candidate	Total	Of round	Transfers	Total	Of round	1st round votesTransfer votes, 2nd round
Labour	Ros Jones	21,996	35.8%	3,368	25,364	50.6%	
Independent	Peter Davies	21,406	34.9%	3,319	24,725	49.4%	
English Democrat	David Allen	4,615	7.5%				
Independent	Michael Maye	4,557	7.4%				
Conservative	Martin Drake	2,811	4.6%				
TUSC	Mary Jackson	1,916	3.1%				
Liberal Democrats	John Brown	1,122	1.8%				
Independent	Tony Ward	1,110	1.8%				
National Front	Dave Owen	1,066	1.7%				
Save Your Services	Doug Wright	786	1.3%				
Labour gain from English Democrat							

=== 2009 ===
The third mayoral election was held on 4 June 2009, the same day as the Elections to the European Parliament. Peter Davies of the English Democrats won. Placing second in terms of first preference votes, Davies beat Michael Maye, an independent with backing from the Liberal Democrats and Green Party, after second preference votes were counted.

2009 Doncaster mayoral election
Party	Candidate	1st round		2nd round			1st round votesTransfer votes, 2nd round
Party	Candidate	Total	Of round	Transfers	Total	Of round	1st round votesTransfer votes, 2nd round
English Democrat	Peter Davies	16,961	22.5%	8,383	25,344	50.4%	
Independent	Michael Maye	17,150	22.8%	7,840	24,990	49.6%	
Labour	Sandra Holland	16,549	22.0%				
Conservative	Jonathan Wood	12,198	16.2%				
BNP	David Owen	8,175	10.9%				
Community Group	Stuart Exelby	2,152	2.9%				
Independent	Michael Felse	2,051	2.7%				
English Democrat gain from Labour							

In the elections of 2002 and 2005, Martin Winter won the mayoralty.

=== 2005 ===
2005 Doncaster Council mayoral election
Party	Candidate	1st round		2nd round			1st round votesTransfer votes, 2nd round
Party	Candidate	Total	Of round	Transfers	Total	Of round	1st round votesTransfer votes, 2nd round
Labour	Martin Winter	40,015	36.72%	5,727	45,742	55.08%	
Independent	Michael Maye	27,304	25.06%	10,004	37,308	44.92%	
Conservative	Raymond Bartlett	12,533	11.50%				
Community Group	Jessie Credland	10,263	9.42%				
Independent	Michael Cooper	7,773	7.13%				
BNP	David Owen	6,128	5.62%				
Green	Richard Rolt	4,930	4.52%				
Turnout		108,946	53.54	Rejected ballots: 7,569			
Registered electors		234,514					
Labour hold							

=== 2002 ===
2002 Doncaster mayoral election
Party	Candidate	1st round		2nd round			1st round votesTransfer votes, 2nd round
Party	Candidate	Total	Of round	Transfers	Total	Of round	1st round votesTransfer votes, 2nd round
Labour	Martin Winter	21,494	36.75%	4,213	25,707	66.92%	
Conservative	Andrew Burden	9,000	15.39%	3,707	12,707	33.08%	
Community Group	Jessie Credland	8,469	14.48%				
Independent	Michael Maye	7,502	12.83%				
Liberal Democrats	Graham Newman	5,150	8.81%				
Independent	Terry Wilcox	4,036	6.90%				
Independent	Shafiq Ahmad Khan	2,836	4.85%				
Turnout		58,487	27.02				
Registered electors		216,097					
Labour win							

== Referendums ==
=== 2012 ===
A referendum was held after being triggered by the councils' ruling Labour group on the retention of the mayor system or reverting to the previous leader and cabinet system. The results of the referendum were in favour of retaining the mayor.

Mayoral referendum 3 May 2012
Choice	Votes	%
Elected Mayor	42,196	61.98
Cabinet System	25,879	38.02
Required majority		50
Total	68,075	100.00
Valid votes	68,075	99.63
Invalid/blank votes	255	0.37
Total votes	68,330	100.00
Registered voters/turnout	223,404	30.59
Source: Doncaster Council

=== 2001 ===
An all-postal ballot was held on 20 September 2001 on whether to establish an executive mayor, resulting in a majority of the electorate voting in favour.

Doncaster Mayoral referendum 20 September 2001
Choice	Votes	%
Elected Mayor	35,453	64.64
Cabinet System	19,398	35.36
Required majority		50
Total	54,851	100.00
Registered voters/turnout		25
