= 2009 Warwickshire County Council election =

2009 UK local government election

2009 local election results in Warwickshire

Elections to Warwickshire County Council took place on 4 June 2009, having been delayed from 7 May, in order to coincide with elections to the European Parliament.

== Summary of Results ==
Warwickshire County Council election, 2009
Party	Seats	Gains	Losses	Net gain/loss	Seats %	Votes %	Votes	+/−
Conservative	39	16	4	+12	63%	43%	83,186	+3.75%
Liberal Democrats	12	4	3	+1	19%	23%	44,260	-3.87%
Labour	10	0	13	-13	16%	17%	33,843	-13.15%
Whitnash Independents	1	0	0	±0	2%	1%	1,632	
Green	0	0	0	±0	0%	11%	21,115	
BNP	0	0	0	±0	0%	3%	6,271	N/A
Other parties	0	0	0	±0	0%	2%	3,074	N/A

== Divisional Results ==
=== North Warwickshire ===
Seat	Result	Majority
Arley	Conservative HOLD	1,055
Atherstone	Conservative GAIN from Labour	87
Baddlesley	Labour HOLD	188
Coleshill	Conservative HOLD	604
Hartshill	Conservative GAIN from Labour	370
Kingsbury	Labour HOLD	221
Polesworth	Conservative GAIN from Labour	200
Water Orton	Conservative HOLD	937

=== Nuneaton and Bedworth ===
Seat	Result	Majority
Abbey	Labour HOLD	
Arbury and Stockingford*	Conservative GAIN from Labour	
Bede	Labour HOLD	
Bedworth North	Conservative GAIN from Labour	
Bedworth West	Labour HOLD	
Bulkington	Conservative HOLD	
Camp Hill	Labour HOLD	
Galley Common	Conservative GAIN from Labour	
Poplar	Labour HOLD	
St. Nicholas	Conservative HOLD	
Weddington	Conservative HOLD	
Wembrook	Labour HOLD	
Whitestone	Conservative HOLD	

Arbury and Stockingford (2)
Party	Candidate	Votes	%	±%
Green	Alty, James Christopher Myles	692	7.69%	
BNP	Findley, Martyn Russell	1283	14.27%	
Labour	Henry, Pat	1472	16.37%	
Labour	Longden, Barry James	1480	16.46%	
Conservative	Wilson, Sonja Lund	1582	17.59%	
Conservative	Wilson, Tom	1637	18.2%	
Green	Wright, Mike	848	9.43%	
Majority				
Turnout				

Bede
Party	Candidate	Votes	%	±%
Labour	Chattaway, Richard	1,258	45.32%	
BNP	Deacon, Alwyn Mark	583	21.00%	
Conservative	Hadden, Stuart	578	20.82%	
Green	Ingall, Caz	101	3.64%	
English Democrat	Lane, David Ford	256	9.22%	
Majority				
Turnout		2,776		

Bedworth North
Party	Candidate	Votes	%	±%
BNP	Bennett, Kevin Paul	429	15.78%	
Labour	Haynes, John	727	26.74%	
Independent	Lane, John Stephen	309	11.36%	
Conservative	Lobbett, Barry	840	30.89%	
Green	Wandless-Phillips, Clare Louise	414	15.23%	
Majority				
Turnout		2,719		

Bedworth West
Party	Candidate	Votes	%	±%
Liberal Democrats	Field, Alice Rachel	289	11.31%	
Conservative	Hadden, Chris	776	30.37%	
BNP	Haywood, Darren John	427	16.71%	
Labour	McCarney, Frank	889	34.79%	
Green	Phillips, Ben	174	6.81%	
Majority				
Turnout				

Bulkington
Party	Candidate	Votes	%	±%
Labour	Beaumont John Brian			
Green	Patrick Andrew John			
Conservative	Smith Richard Thomas			
Majority				
Turnout				

Nuneaton Abbey
Party	Candidate	Votes	%	±%
Green	Carter Juliet Anne			
TUSC	Clark George Alan			
Labour	Hicks Robert Donald			
BNP	Lincoln Maureen			
Conservative	Paxton Stephen James			
Majority				
Turnout				

Nuneaton Camphill
Party	Candidate	Votes	%	±%
Labour	Davies Corinne			
Conservative	Gutteridge Mark Lancelot			
BNP	Holmes Jason			
Green	Jhita Avnash			
TUSC	Reilly Paul			
Majority				
Turnout				

Nuneaton Galley Common
Party	Candidate	Votes	%	±%
Conservative	Foster James			
Labour	Johnson Philip			
TUSC	McGuire Paige Louise			
Green	Watson Marcia Elaine			
Majority				
Turnout				

St. Nicolas
Party	Candidate	Votes	%	±%
Conservative	Clarke Jeffrey			
Green	Kondakor Michele Marie Pascale			
TUSC	White Daniel Stephen			
Labour	Wilson Sonja Lund			
Majority				
Turnout				

Nuneaton Weddington
Party	Candidate	Votes	%	±%
Conservative	Farnell Alan John			
Green	Kondakor Keith Anthony			
Labour	Margrave Samuel John			
TUSC	McGraff Brendan			
UKIP	Slipper Dennis			
Majority				
Turnout				

Nuneaton Wem Brook
Party	Candidate	Votes	%	±%
Independent	Harbison Scott George Moreton			
Green	Horobin Alexander Scott			
BNP	Kimberley Phillip			
TUSC	Playdon Peter			
Independent	Sheppard William Henry			
Labour	Tandy June Anne			
Conservative	Walmsley Hayden Brian			
Majority				
Turnout				

Whitestone
Party	Candidate	Votes	%	±%
Green	Bonner Ian Charles			
Labour	Crichton Andrew Stephen			
Conservative	Heatley Martin Leslie			
Majority				
Turnout				

Poplar
Party	Candidate	Votes	%	±%
BNP	Haycock Glyn David			
Labour	Jackson Julie Anne			
Conservative	Llewellyn-Nash Ian Christopher			
TUSC	Mosey Catherine			
Majority				
Turnout				

=== Rugby ===
Seat	Result	Majority
Admirals	Conservative GAIN from Labour	
Brownsover*	Conservative GAIN from Labour	
Caldecott*	Conservative HOLD	
Dunchurch	Conservative HOLD	
Earl Craven	Conservative HOLD	
Eastlands and Hillmorton*	Liberal Democrats HOLD	
Fosse	Conservative HOLD	
Lawford and New Bilton	Conservative GAIN from Labour	

=== Stratford upon Avon ===
Seat	Result	Majority
Alcester	Conservative GAIN from Liberal Democrats	
Aston Cantlow	Conservative HOLD	
Bidford on Avon	Liberal Democrats HOLD	
Feldon	Conservative HOLD	
Henley in Arden	Conservative HOLD	
Kineton	Conservative GAIN from Liberal Democrats	
Shipston on Stour	Conservative HOLD	
Southam	Conservative HOLD	
Stour and the Vale	Conservative HOLD	
Stratford Avenue and New Town	Liberal Democrats HOLD	
Stratford South*	Liberal Democrats GAIN from Conservative	
Studley	Liberal Democrats GAIN from Conservative	
Wellesbourne	Liberal Democrats GAIN from Conservative	

=== Warwick ===
Seat	Result	Majority
Bishop's Tachbrook	Conservative HOLD	
Cubbington	Conservative HOLD	
Kenilworth, Abbey	Liberal Democrats HOLD	
Kenilworth, Park Hill	Conservative GAIN from Liberal Democrats	
Kenilworth, St. John's	Conservative HOLD	
Leamington, Brunswick	Labour HOLD	
Leamington, Milverton	Liberal Democrats HOLD	
Leamington North*	Liberal Democrats HOLD	
Leamington, Willes	Labour HOLD	
Leek Wootton	Conservative HOLD	
Warwick North	Conservative GAIN from Labour	
Warwick South	Conservative HOLD	
Warwick West	Conservative GAIN from Labour	
Whitnash	Independent HOLD	

- Wards marked with a star elect two members
