= 2000 Barnsley Metropolitan Borough Council election =

2000 UK local government election

| ← 1999 | 4 May 2000 | 2002 → |

One third of seats (22 of 66) to Barnsley Metropolitan Borough Council 34 seats needed for a majority
| | First party | Second party | Third party |
|---|---|---|---|
| Party | Labour | Independent | Liberal Democrats |
| Seats won | 14 | 4 | 2 |
| Seat change | ▼4 | ▲2 | ▲1 |
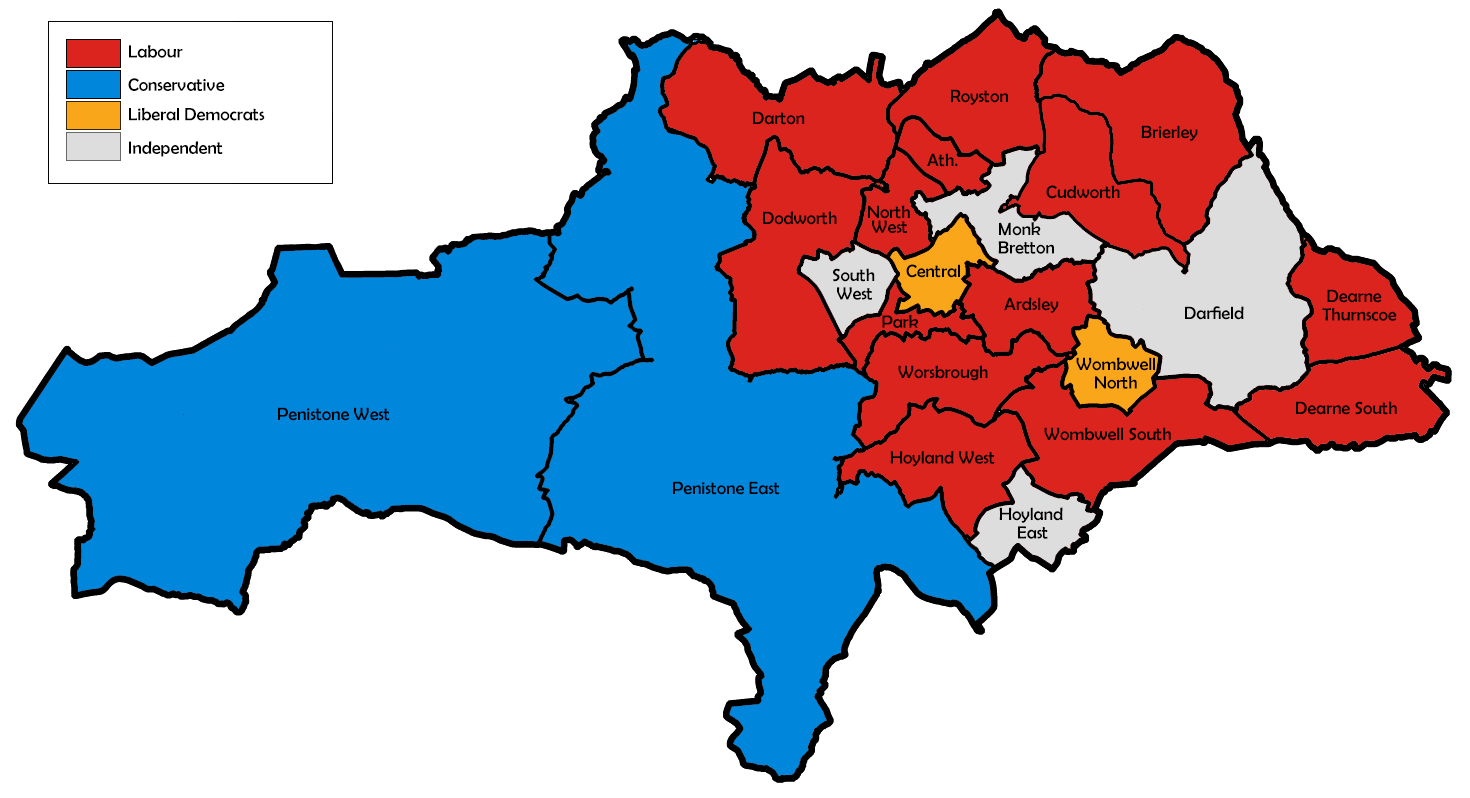
- Map showing the results of the 2000 Barnsley council elections.
Majority party before election
Labour
Majority party after election
Labour

The 2000 Barnsley Metropolitan Borough Council election took place on 4 May 2000 to elect members of Barnsley Metropolitan Borough Council in South Yorkshire, England. Prior to the election, Labour had suffered a by-election loss in South West and two defections to Independent. One third of the council was up for election and the Labour Party stayed in overall control of the council.

== Election results ==
Barnsley Metropolitan Borough Council Election Result 2000
| Party | Seats | Gains | Losses | Net gain/loss | Seats % | Votes % | Votes | +/− |
|---|---|---|---|---|---|---|---|---|
| Labour | 14 | 0 | 4 | -4 | 63.6 | 45.6 | 18,077 | -8.8 |
| Independent | 4 | 3 | 1 | +2 | 18.2 | 18.2 | 7,193 | +13.0 |
| Liberal Democrats | 2 | 1 | 0 | +1 | 9.1 | 18.1 | 7,178 | -4.6 |
| Conservative | 2 | 1 | 0 | +1 | 9.1 | 14.1 | 5,586 | +3.4 |
| Independent Labour | 0 | 0 | 0 | 0 | 0.0 | 2.0 | 779 | -1.2 |
| Green | 0 | 0 | 0 | 0 | 0.0 | 1.6 | 633 | +0.8 |
| Socialist Labour | 0 | 0 | 0 | 0 | 0.0 | 0.2 | 92 | -2.5 |
| Socialist Alternative | 0 | 0 | 0 | 0 | 0.0 | 0.2 | 68 | -0.2 |

This resulted in the following composition of the council:

| Party | Previous council | New council |
|---|---|---|
| Labour | 56 | 52 |
| Independent | 6 | 8 |
| Conservatives | 2 | 3 |
| Liberal Democrats | 2 | 3 |
| Total | 66 | 66 |
| Working majority | 46 | 38 |

== Ward results ==
+/- figures represent changes from the last time these wards were contested.

Ardsley
| Party | Candidate | Votes | % | ±% |
|---|---|---|---|---|
| Labour | Brian Mathers | 700 | 64.7 | +4.8 |
| Liberal Democrats | C Harding | 260 | 24.0 | +0.6 |
| Conservative | Marjorie Cale-Morgan | 122 | 11.3 | +5.0 |
| Majority | | 440 | 40.7 | +4.2 |
| Turnout | | 1,082 | 15.6 | −3.7 |
| Labour hold | | Swing | +2.1 | |

Athersley
| Party | Candidate | Votes | % | ±% |
|---|---|---|---|---|
| Labour | David Bostwick | 614 | 58.7 | −17.0 |
| Independent | D Cooke | 287 | 27.4 | +27.4 |
| Liberal Democrats | H Harding | 101 | 9.7 | −7.9 |
| Conservative | R Hinchliff | 44 | 4.2 | +0.4 |
| Majority | | 327 | 31.3 | −26.9 |
| Turnout | | 1,046 | 17.2 | −1.5 |
| Labour hold | | Swing | -22.2 | |

Brierley
| Party | Candidate | Votes | % | ±% |
|---|---|---|---|---|
| Labour | Arthur Whittaker | 760 | 51.3 | −16.5 |
| Independent Labour | K Collins | 418 | 28.2 | +28.2 |
| Conservative | M West | 159 | 10.7 | −1.1 |
| Liberal Democrats | A Mawson | 144 | 9.7 | +3.8 |
| Majority | | 342 | 23.1 | −30.2 |
| Turnout | | 1,481 | 21.9 | −2.6 |
| Labour hold | | Swing | -22.3 | |

Central
| Party | Candidate | Votes | % | ±% |
|---|---|---|---|---|
| Liberal Democrats | Don Hutton | 923 | 54.5 | +4.1 |
| Labour | Pat Newman | 658 | 38.8 | −4.7 |
| Conservative | R Morrell | 113 | 6.7 | +3.8 |
| Majority | | 265 | 15.6 | +8.7 |
| Turnout | | 1,694 | 20.8 | −4.9 |
| Liberal Democrats gain from Labour | | Swing | +4.4 | |

Cudworth
| Party | Candidate | Votes | % | ±% |
|---|---|---|---|---|
| Labour | Steve Houghton | 1,030 | 50.7 | −21.7 |
| Independent | T Jamil | 795 | 39.1 | +39.1 |
| Liberal Democrats | C Stimson | 108 | 5.3 | −11.6 |
| Conservative | Ann Campbell | 98 | 4.8 | −2.8 |
| Majority | | 235 | 11.6 | −43.9 |
| Turnout | | 2,031 | 27.1 | +3.9 |
| Labour hold | | Swing | -30.4 | |

Darfield
| Party | Candidate | Votes | % | ±% |
|---|---|---|---|---|
| Independent | Ron Fisher | 1,251 | 50.4 | +50.4 |
| Labour | Dorothy Higginbottom | 981 | 39.6 | −27.0 |
| Conservative | Elizabeth Hill | 132 | 5.3 | −3.0 |
| Liberal Democrats | M Brown | 116 | 4.7 | −20.3 |
| Majority | | 270 | 10.9 | −30.7 |
| Turnout | | 2,480 | 31.5 | +7.2 |
| Independent gain from Labour | | Swing | +38.7 | |

Darton
| Party | Candidate | Votes | % | ±% |
|---|---|---|---|---|
| Labour | Roy Miller | 1,245 | 51.3 | −9.6 |
| Independent | S Birkinshaw | 599 | 24.7 | +24.7 |
| Conservative | Jim Smith | 320 | 13.2 | +3.7 |
| Liberal Democrats | P Jaques | 265 | 10.9 | −16.8 |
| Majority | | 646 | 26.6 | −6.6 |
| Turnout | | 2,429 | 22.8 | +2.3 |
| Labour hold | | Swing | -17.1 | |

Dearne South
| Party | Candidate | Votes | % | ±% |
|---|---|---|---|---|
| Labour | John 'Inky' Thomson | 1,111 | 53.0 | −17.3 |
| Liberal Democrats | Sharron Brook | 897 | 42.8 | +17.2 |
| Conservative | M Lockwood | 90 | 4.3 | +0.1 |
| Majority | | 214 | 10.2 | −34.5 |
| Turnout | | 2,098 | 24.5 | +4.5 |
| Labour hold | | Swing | -17.2 | |

Dearne Thurnscoe
| Party | Candidate | Votes | % | ±% |
|---|---|---|---|---|
| Labour | Peter Bird | 946 | 72.8 | −4.1 |
| Liberal Democrats | M Newton | 239 | 18.4 | −0.4 |
| Conservative | Gordon Wilkinson | 115 | 8.8 | +4.5 |
| Majority | | 707 | 54.4 | −3.7 |
| Turnout | | 1,300 | 16.8 | −2.2 |
| Labour hold | | Swing | -1.8 | |

Dodworth
| Party | Candidate | Votes | % | ±% |
|---|---|---|---|---|
| Labour | John Ryan | 930 | 41.6 | +1.3 |
| Green | Donald Jones | 374 | 16.7 | +4.7 |
| Independent | M Walsh | 363 | 16.3 | −4.2 |
| Conservative | George Hill | 311 | 13.9 | +4.2 |
| Liberal Democrats | S Heyworth | 255 | 11.4 | −4.2 |
| Majority | | 556 | 24.9 | +5.1 |
| Turnout | | 2,233 | 21.7 | +1.9 |
| Labour hold | | Swing | -1.7 | |

Hoyland East
| Party | Candidate | Votes | % | ±% |
|---|---|---|---|---|
| Independent | Mick Brankin | 1,210 | 57.6 | +37.3 |
| Labour | Peter Beardshall | 635 | 30.2 | −27.2 |
| Liberal Democrats | D Hulse | 139 | 6.6 | −5.6 |
| Conservative | Hilda Jobling | 118 | 5.6 | −2.1 |
| Majority | | 575 | 27.4 | −9.4 |
| Turnout | | 2,102 | 26.4 | +2.5 |
| Independent gain from Labour | | Swing | +32.2 | |

Hoyland West
| Party | Candidate | Votes | % | ±% |
|---|---|---|---|---|
| Labour | Sharon Howard | 862 | 59.6 | +8.1 |
| Liberal Democrats | B Martin | 360 | 24.9 | +9.7 |
| Conservative | Howard Oldfield | 225 | 15.5 | +9.2 |
| Majority | | 502 | 34.7 | +8.1 |
| Turnout | | 1,447 | 22.6 | −5.4 |
| Labour hold | | Swing | -0.5 | |

Monk Bretton
| Party | Candidate | Votes | % | ±% |
|---|---|---|---|---|
| Independent | Grace Brown | 919 | 45.8 | +4.7 |
| Labour | Tom Sheard | 807 | 40.2 | −1.2 |
| Liberal Democrats | Sally Brook | 167 | 8.3 | −4.0 |
| Conservative | Stuart Wilkinson | 113 | 5.6 | +0.4 |
| Majority | | 112 | 5.6 | +5.3 |
| Turnout | | 2,006 | 24.2 | +0.8 |
| Independent gain from Labour | | Swing | +2.9 | |

North West
| Party | Candidate | Votes | % | ±% |
|---|---|---|---|---|
| Labour | Bill Denton | 633 | 50.1 | −3.2 |
| Liberal Democrats | P Henstock | 329 | 26.0 | +0.4 |
| Conservative | M Allerton | 301 | 23.8 | +4.9 |
| Majority | | 304 | 24.1 | −3.6 |
| Turnout | | 1,263 | 18.1 | +0.3 |
| Labour hold | | Swing | -1.8 | |

Park
| Party | Candidate | Votes | % | ±% |
|---|---|---|---|---|
| Labour | Peter Doyle | 621 | 63.3 | −3.0 |
| Liberal Democrats | R Rees | 241 | 24.6 | +3.8 |
| Conservative | D Plotts | 119 | 12.1 | +3.6 |
| Majority | | 380 | 38.7 | −5.8 |
| Turnout | | 981 | 17.9 | −1.6 |
| Labour hold | | Swing | -3.4 | |

Penistone East
| Party | Candidate | Votes | % | ±% |
|---|---|---|---|---|
| Conservative | Alec Rowley | 1,188 | 49.0 | +9.3 |
| Labour | Peter Starling | 801 | 33.0 | −6.6 |
| Liberal Democrats | Trish Arundel | 437 | 18.0 | −2.7 |
| Majority | | 387 | 16.0 | +15.9 |
| Turnout | | 2,426 | 31.6 | −2.0 |
| Conservative gain from Independent | | Swing | +7.9 | |

Penistone West
| Party | Candidate | Votes | % | ±% |
|---|---|---|---|---|
| Conservative | Brenda Hinchliff | 1,340 | 55.5 | +32.8 |
| Labour | C Shaw | 613 | 25.4 | −17.3 |
| Green | F Charlesworth | 259 | 10.7 | +10.7 |
| Liberal Democrats | J Heyworth | 202 | 8.4 | −26.3 |
| Majority | | 727 | 30.1 | +22.1 |
| Turnout | | 2,414 | 27.5 | +3.2 |
| Conservative hold | | Swing | +25.0 | |

Royston
| Party | Candidate | Votes | % | ±% |
|---|---|---|---|---|
| Labour | Bill Newman | 997 | 51.0 | −7.9 |
| Liberal Democrats | E Gouthwaite | 475 | 24.3 | −8.0 |
| Independent Labour | C Sanger | 361 | 18.5 | +18.5 |
| Conservative | Kath Leeds | 123 | 6.3 | +0.3 |
| Majority | | 522 | 26.7 | +0.0 |
| Turnout | | 1,956 | 22.2 | +0.7 |
| Labour hold | | Swing | +0.0 | |

South West
| Party | Candidate | Votes | % | ±% |
|---|---|---|---|---|
| Independent | Sandra Birkinshaw | 1,207 | 64.4 | +23.6 |
| Labour | C Henshaw | 376 | 20.1 | −4.2 |
| Conservative | John Wilson | 165 | 8.8 | −11.2 |
| Liberal Democrats | D McVey | 127 | 6.8 | −7.0 |
| Majority | | 831 | 44.3 | +27.7 |
| Turnout | | 1,875 | 25.9 | −1.1 |
| Independent hold | | Swing | +13.9 | |

Wombwell North
| Party | Candidate | Votes | % | ±% |
|---|---|---|---|---|
| Liberal Democrats | Sarah Brook | 891 | 58.9 | +11.5 |
| Labour | John Clarke | 580 | 38.3 | −10.8 |
| Conservative | N Cuss | 43 | 2.8 | +1.0 |
| Majority | | 311 | 20.5 | +18.8 |
| Turnout | | 1,514 | 30.2 | −1.1 |
| Liberal Democrats hold | | Swing | +11.1 | |

Wombwell South
| Party | Candidate | Votes | % | ±% |
|---|---|---|---|---|
| Labour | Margaret Morgan | 1,079 | 54.9 | −9.6 |
| Independent | Trevor Smith | 394 | 20.1 | +20.1 |
| Liberal Democrats | W Millard | 258 | 13.1 | −8.7 |
| Conservative | W Barkworth | 166 | 8.4 | +1.0 |
| Socialist Alternative | A Waller | 68 | 3.5 | −2.8 |
| Majority | | 685 | 34.9 | −7.7 |
| Turnout | | 1,965 | 24.5 | +0.5 |
| Labour hold | | Swing | -14.8 | |

Worsbrough
| Party | Candidate | Votes | % | ±% |
|---|---|---|---|---|
| Labour | Jimmy Rae | 1,098 | 61.6 | +10.0 |
| Liberal Democrats | Pat Durie | 244 | 13.7 | +0.1 |
| Conservative | Elizabeth Elders | 181 | 10.2 | +4.1 |
| Independent | David Wood | 168 | 9.4 | −8.4 |
| Socialist Labour | Terry Robinson | 92 | 5.2 | −5.7 |
| Majority | | 854 | 47.9 | +14.1 |
| Turnout | | 1,783 | 23.7 | −3.0 |
| Labour hold | | Swing | +4.9 | |

== By-elections between 2000 and 2002 ==
Dodworth 7 June 2001 By-election
| Party | Candidate | Votes | % | ±% |
|---|---|---|---|---|
| Labour | Christopher Jenkinson | 2,452 | 43.1 | +1.4 |
| Liberal Democrats | Anthony Conway | 1,273 | 22.4 | +10.9 |
| Conservative | George Hill | 766 | 13.5 | −0.5 |
| Independent | Michael Walsh | 761 | 13.4 | −2.9 |
| Green | Donald Jones | 438 | 7.7 | −9.1 |
| Majority | | 1,179 | 20.7 | −4.2 |
| Turnout | | 5,690 | 53.9 | +32.2 |
| Labour hold | | Swing | -4.7 | |

Athersley By-Election 7 March 2002
| Party | Candidate | Votes | % | ±% |
|---|---|---|---|---|
| Labour | Patricia Newman | 527 | 62.1 | +3.4 |
| Independent | Jack Brown | 187 | 22.0 | −5.4 |
| Liberal Democrats | Jean Roberts | 106 | 12.5 | +2.8 |
| Socialist Alliance | James White | 29 | 3.4 | +3.4 |
| Majority | | 340 | 40.1 | +8.8 |
| Turnout | | 849 | 14.0 | −3.2 |
| Labour hold | | Swing | +4.4 | |
