= 1996 Barnsley Metropolitan Borough Council election =

1996 local election in England

← 1995	3 May 1996	1998 →
Party	Labour	Conservative	Independent
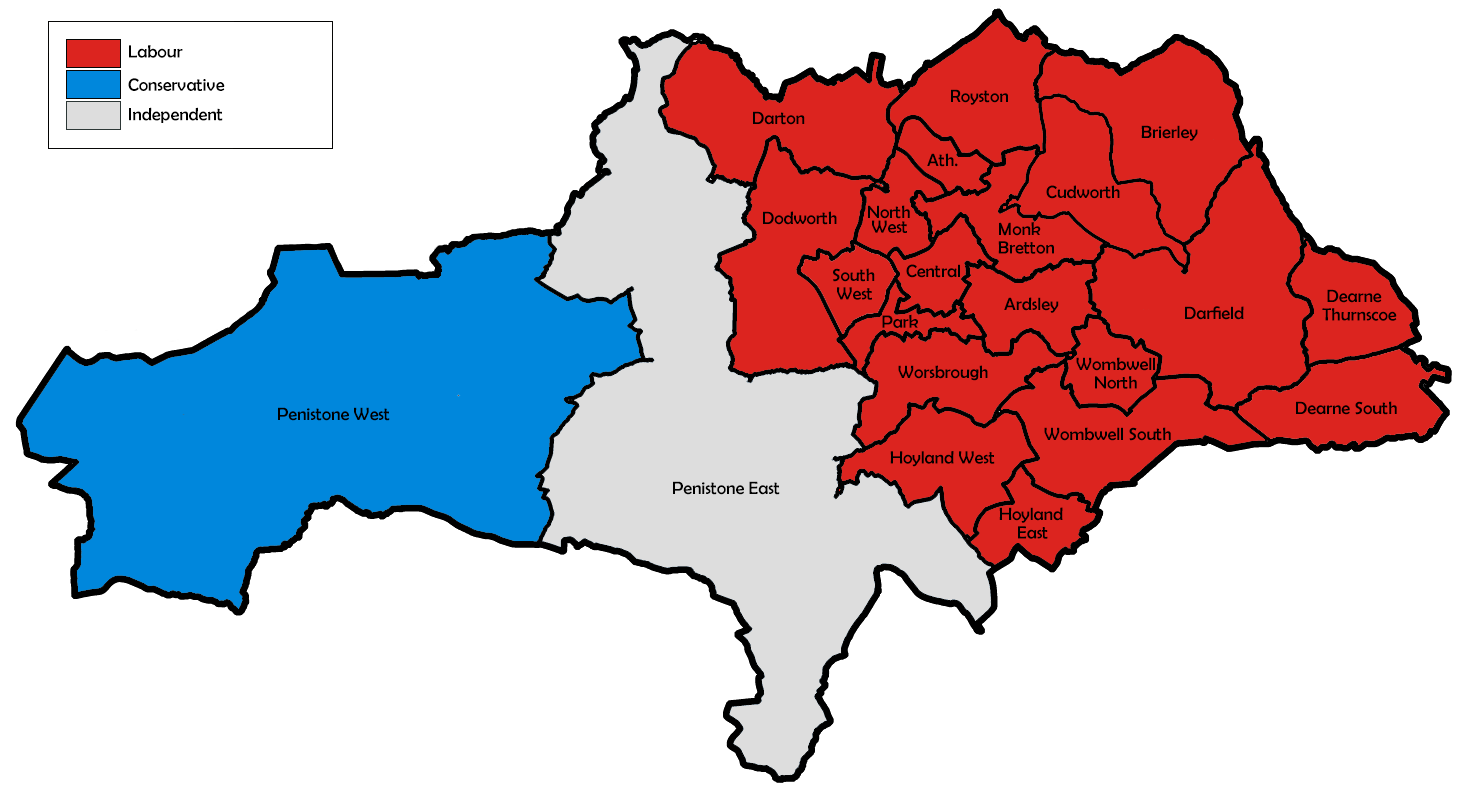
- Map showing the results of the 1996 Barnsley council elections.
Majority party before election
Labour
Majority party after election
Labour

Elections to Barnsley Metropolitan Borough Council were held on 3 May 1996, with one third of the council up for election. The election resulted in Labour retaining control of the council.

== Election result ==
Barnsley Metropolitan Borough Council Election Result 1996
Party	Seats	Gains	Losses	Net gain/loss	Seats %	Votes %	Votes	+/−
Labour	20	0	1	-1	90.9	68.6	11,460	-2.3
Conservative	1	0	0	0	4.5	12.2	2,040	+5.4
Independent	1	1	0	+1	4.5	9.6	1,604	-3.4
Green	0	0	0	0	0.0	5.3	883	+0.3
Independent Labour	0	0	0	0	0.0	2.9	481	+0.5
Militant Labour	0	0	0	0	0.0	1.4	235	-0.5

This resulted in the following composition of the council:

Party	Previous council	New council
Labour	64	63
Independent	1	2
Conservatives	1	1
Total	66	66
Working majority	62	60

== Ward results ==
+/- figures represent changes from the last time these wards were contested.

Ardsley (7226)
Party	Candidate	Votes	%	±%
Labour	Brian Mathers	Unopposed	N/A	N/A
Labour hold		Swing	N/A	

Athersley (6075)
Party	Candidate	Votes	%	±%
Labour	David Bostwick*	Unopposed	N/A	N/A
Labour hold		Swing	N/A	

Brierley (7169)
Party	Candidate	Votes	%	±%
Labour	Arthur Whittaker*	1,382	84.6	+19.4
Conservative	Schofield D. Ms.	252	15.4	+4.0
Majority		1,130	69.2	+27.4
Turnout		1,634	22.8	−8.7
Labour hold		Swing	+7.7	

Central (8646)
Party	Candidate	Votes	%	±%
Labour	Judith Watts*	Unopposed	N/A	N/A
Labour hold		Swing	N/A	

Cudworth (7769)
Party	Candidate	Votes	%	±%
Labour	Steve Houghton*	1,589	88.3	−0.5
Independent	Cowton S.	211	11.7	+0.5
Majority		1,378	76.6	−0.9
Turnout		1,800	23.2	−3.2
Labour hold		Swing	-0.5	

Darfield (7792)
Party	Candidate	Votes	%	±%
Labour	Eric Barlow*	Unopposed	N/A	N/A
Labour hold		Swing	N/A	

Darton (10385)
Party	Candidate	Votes	%	±%
Labour	Roy Miller*	Unopposed	N/A	N/A
Labour hold		Swing	N/A	

Dearne South (8856)
Party	Candidate	Votes	%	±%
Labour	John 'Inky' Thomson*	Unopposed	N/A	N/A
Labour hold		Swing	N/A	

Dearne Thurnscoe (8114)
Party	Candidate	Votes	%	±%
Labour	Peter Bird*	Unopposed	N/A	N/A
Labour hold		Swing	N/A	

Dodworth (10130)
Party	Candidate	Votes	%	±%
Labour	John Ryan*	1,822	74.3	−3.7
Green	Jones D.	630	25.7	+3.7
Majority		1,192	48.6	−7.5
Turnout		2,452	24.2	−6.2
Labour hold		Swing	-3.7	

Hoyland East (8012)
Party	Candidate	Votes	%	±%
Labour	Peter Beardshall*	Unopposed	N/A	N/A
Labour hold		Swing	N/A	

Hoyland West (6643)
Party	Candidate	Votes	%	±%
Labour	Clarrie Wroe*	Unopposed	N/A	N/A
Labour hold		Swing	N/A	

Monk Bretton (8456)
Party	Candidate	Votes	%	±%
Labour	Tom Sheard*	Unopposed	N/A	N/A
Labour hold		Swing	N/A	

North West (7212)
Party	Candidate	Votes	%	±%
Labour	Bill Denton*	1,005	73.6	−3.5
Conservative	Carrington C. Ms.	230	16.8	+16.8
Independent Labour	Holderness B.	130	9.5	+9.5
Majority		775	56.8	+2.5
Turnout		1,365	19.0	
Labour hold		Swing	-10.1	

Park (5659)
Party	Candidate	Votes	%	±%
Labour	Peter Doyle*	Unopposed	N/A	N/A
Labour hold		Swing	N/A	

Penistone East (7622)
Party	Candidate	Votes	%	±%
Independent	John Wade	1,393	50.2	+50.2
Labour	Linda Smith*	1,382	49.8	−8.2
Majority		11	0.4	−15.5
Turnout		2,775	36.6	−3.8
Independent gain from Labour		Swing	+29.2	

Penistone West (8461)
Party	Candidate	Votes	%	±%
Conservative	Brenda Hinchliff.*	1,220	42.4	+42.4
Labour	Trevor Cave	1,051	36.6	−7.1
Independent Labour	Scott S. Ms.	351	12.2	+12.2
Green	Wood A. Ms.	253	8.8	−6.4
Majority		169	5.9	+3.4
Turnout		2,875	34.0	−2.0
Conservative hold		Swing	+24.7	

Royston (8529)
Party	Candidate	Votes	%	±%
Labour	Bill Newman*	Unopposed	N/A	N/A
Labour hold		Swing	N/A	

South West (7537)
Party	Candidate	Votes	%	±%
Labour	Malcolm Hall*	1,432	80.9	N/A
Conservative	John Carrington	338	19.1	N/A
Majority		1,094	61.8	N/A
Turnout		1,770	23.5	N/A
Labour hold		Swing	N/A	

Wombwell North (5075)
Party	Candidate	Votes	%	±%
Labour	Arnold Storey*	Unopposed	N/A	N/A
Labour hold		Swing	N/A	

Wombwell South (8061)
Party	Candidate	Votes	%	±%
Labour	Margaret Morgan*	Unopposed	N/A	N/A
Labour hold		Swing	N/A	

Worsbrough (7815)
Party	Candidate	Votes	%	±%
Labour	Gerald Hadfield*	1,797	88.4	+4.8
Militant Labour	Souter C. Ms.	235	11.6	-4.8
Majority		1,562	76.9	+9.7
Turnout		2,032	26.0	−6.8
Labour hold		Swing	+4.8	

== By-elections between 1996 and 1998 ==
Brierley (7197) 20 March 1997 By-election
Party	Candidate	Votes	%	±%
Labour	Chris Sykes	1,064	70.7	−13.9
Conservative	Beaumont-Schofield, D. M.	230	15.3	−0.1
Liberal Democrats	Sarah Brook	211	14.0	+14.0
Majority		834	55.4	−13.8
Turnout		1,505	20.9	−1.9
Labour hold		Swing	-6.9	

Worsbrough 5 March 1998 By-Election
Party	Candidate	Votes	%	±%
Labour	Jimmy Rae	1,398	71.4	−17.0
Socialist Labour	Anne Scargill	331	16.9	+16.9
Liberal Democrats	Ian Guest	151	7.7	+7.7
Conservative	Elizabeth Elders	79	4.0	+4.0
Majority		1,067	54.5	−22.4
Turnout		1,959	25.5	−0.5
Labour hold		Swing	-16.9	
