= 2008 Barnsley Metropolitan Borough Council election =

2008 UK local government election

← 2007	1 May 2008	2010 →

One third of seats (23 of 63) to Barnsley Metropolitan Borough Council 32 seats needed for a majority
	First party	Second party	Third party
Party	Barnsley Ind.	Labour	Conservative
Seats won	10	8	2
Seat change	▲2	▼1	▲1
- Map of the 2008 Barnsley council election results. Barnsley Independent in teal, Labour in red, Conservatives in blue, Liberal Democrats in yellow and Independent in grey.
Majority party before election
Labour
Majority party after election
Labour

The 2008 Barnsley Metropolitan Borough Council election took place on 1 May 2008 to elect members of Barnsley Metropolitan Borough Council in South Yorkshire, England. One third of the council, alongside an additional vacancy in Old Town was up for election. Prior to the election the defending councillor in Penistone West, having earlier defected from Conservative to the Barnsley Independent Group, fought the election as an Independent. The Labour Party stayed in overall control of the council.

== Election result ==
Before the election it had been thought that the Labour Party might lose overall control of the council but they held on by only one seat. They lost two seats to the Barnsley Independent Group but gained one seat from the Liberal Democrats to hold on. The Barnsley Independent Group also lost 1 seat to the Conservatives. Overall turnout was 34.78%.

The losses for the Labour Party were blamed on government policies, such as on immigration and the abolition of the 10p income tax band, by the leader of the council, Steve Houghton, who was himself re-elected for Cudworth ward.

Barnsley Metropolitan Borough Council Election Result 2008
Party	Seats	Gains	Losses	Net gain/loss	Seats %	Votes %	Votes	+/−
Barnsley Ind.	10	2	0	+2	45.5	23.0	13,517	-0.8
Labour	8	1	2	-1	36.4	31.4	18,443	-7.8
Conservative	2	1	0	+1	9.1	15.2	8,930	+1.1
Liberal Democrats	1	0	1	-1	4.5	6.6	3,880	+1.0
Independent	1	0	1	-1	4.5	5.8	3,429	+2.5
BNP	0	0	0	0	0.0	17.0	9,959	+3.4
Green	0	0	0	0	0.0	0.8	440	+0.3
UKIP	0	0	0	0	0.0	0.1	76	+0.1

This resulted in the following composition of the council:

Party	Previous council	New council
Labour	33	32
Barnsley Independent	20	22
Conservatives	5	6
Independent	3	2
Liberal Democrats	2	1
Total	63	63
Working majority	3	1

== Ward results ==
+/- figures represent changes from the last time these wards were contested.

Central
Party	Candidate	Votes	%	±%
Labour	Doug Birkinshaw	775	31.0	−12.2
Barnsley Ind.	Noel Cowdell	660	26.4	+3.9
BNP	Peter Marshall	621	24.8	−1.0
Liberal Democrats	Eddie Gouthwaite	243	9.7	+9.7
Conservative	Andrew Barr	202	8.1	−0.4
Majority		115	4.6	−12.8
Turnout		2,501	31.8	+1.0
Labour gain from Liberal Democrats		Swing	-8.0	

Cudworth
Party	Candidate	Votes	%	±%
Labour	Steve Houghton	1,279	48.9	−25.6
BNP	Terry Hubbard	650	24.9	+24.9
Liberal Democrats	Pam Kershaw	215	8.2	+8.2
Independent	Ian Sanders	184	7.0	+7.0
Conservative	Dorothy Shaw	183	7.0	−18.5
Barnsley Ind.	David Surgey	82	3.1	+3.1
Independent	Tony Devoy	22	0.8	+0.8
Majority		629	24.0	−25.1
Turnout		2,615	32.8	+5.5
Labour hold		Swing	-25.2	

Darfield
Party	Candidate	Votes	%	±%
Barnsley Ind.	Ron Fisher	1,457	56.8	+11.9
Labour	Brian Mathers	510	19.9	−9.2
BNP	Steve O'Connor	316	12.3	−1.1
Conservative	Gillian Milner	282	11.0	+4.4
Majority		947	46.9	+31.1
Turnout		2,565	32.7	−1.0
Barnsley Ind. hold		Swing	+10.5	

Darton East
Party	Candidate	Votes	%	±%
Labour	John Parkinson	1,044	34.5	−5.5
BNP	Colin Porter	669	22.1	+4.9
Independent	John Race	606	20.0	+8.5
Conservative	Howard Pearson	490	16.2	+2.7
Liberal Democrats	Sally Brook	220	7.3	+7.3
Majority		375	12.4	−9.8
Turnout		3,029	36.0	−1.1
Labour hold		Swing	-5.2	

Darton West
Party	Candidate	Votes	%	±%
Labour	Alice Cave	1,173	36.8	−6.2
BNP	Ian Sutton	919	28.8	+1.8
Conservative	Gordon Wilkinson	554	17.4	+5.4
Independent	Jean Rowley	545	17.1	+17.1
Majority		254	8.0	−8.1
Turnout		3,191	38.8	−1.7
Labour hold		Swing	-4.0	

Dearne North
Party	Candidate	Votes	%	±%
Labour	Jennifer Worton	853	40.2	−6.7
BNP	Rob Garrett	392	18.5	−3.1
Barnsley Ind.	Ian Garner	375	17.7	+13.0
Liberal Democrats	Sarah Brook	316	14.9	−6.6
Conservative	Paul Buckley	186	8.8	+3.4
Majority		461	21.7	−3.6
Turnout		2,122	26.2	−0.3
Labour hold		Swing	-1.8	

Dearne South
Party	Candidate	Votes	%	±%
Liberal Democrats	Sharron Brook	1,094	39.6	+12.9
Labour	Ralph Sixsmith	934	33.8	−12.1
BNP	June Peel	590	21.3	−1.3
Conservative	Deborah Toon	146	5.3	+0.5
Majority		160	5.8	−13.3
Turnout		2,764	30.6	−2.2
Liberal Democrats hold		Swing	+12.5	

Dodworth
Party	Candidate	Votes	%	±%
Barnsley Ind.	Philip Birkinshaw	1,444	48.7	+10.8
Labour	Pauline Haigh	654	22.0	−6.1
Conservative	George Hill	456	15.4	+1.0
BNP	Nick Parker	414	13.9	+0.8
Majority		790	26.7	+16.9
Turnout		2,968	37.9	−1.9
Barnsley Ind. hold		Swing	+8.4	

Hoyland Milton
Party	Candidate	Votes	%	±%
Barnsley Ind.	Michael Brankin	1,159	40.4	−6.7
Labour	Robin Franklin	902	31.5	−11.9
Conservative	Alan Pilkington	296	10.3	+0.8
BNP	Simon Goodricke	289	10.1	+10.1
Green	Carol Robb	145	5.1	+5.1
UKIP	Wayne Harling	76	2.7	+2.7
Majority		257	8.9	+5.2
Turnout		2,867	32.1	+1.1
Barnsley Ind. hold		Swing	+2.6	

Kingstone
Party	Candidate	Votes	%	±%
Barnsley Ind.	Malcolm Price	1,016	45.7	+1.4
Labour	Kath Mitchell	565	25.4	−9.8
BNP	Peter Robinson	407	18.3	+3.2
Conservative	Geoffrey Turvey	155	7.0	+1.6
Independent	Frank Watson	80	3.6	+3.6
Majority		451	20.3	+11.1
Turnout		2,223	28.0	−2.8
Barnsley Ind. hold		Swing	+5.6	

Monk Bretton
Party	Candidate	Votes	%	±%
Independent	Grace Brown	911	33.4	+33.4
BNP	Jane Hubbard	668	24.5	+7.4
Labour	Nadia Richardson	664	24.3	−19.0
Liberal Democrats	Ken Smith	247	9.0	+9.0
Conservative	Peter Murray	241	8.8	−1.7
Majority		243	8.9	−5.3
Turnout		2,731	33.3	+5.3
Independent hold		Swing	+13.0	

North East
Party	Candidate	Votes	%	±%
Barnsley Ind.	Danny Gillespie	1,522	45.9	+2.3
Labour	Arthur Whittaker	1,183	35.7	−2.7
BNP	Dennis Seilly	308	9.3	+2.6
Conservative	Frances Hamer	305	9.2	+3.5
Majority		339	10.2	+5.0
Turnout		3,318	36.2	−0.6
Barnsley Ind. gain from Labour		Swing	+0.2	

Old Town (2)
Party	Candidate	Votes	%	±%
Barnsley Ind.	Bill Gaunt	1,503	48.6	−7.1
Barnsley Ind.	John Love	1,255		
Labour	Phil Davies	721	23.3	+1.6
BNP	Daniel Cooke	564	18.2	+4.2
BNP	Lancer White	424		
Conservative	Elizabeth Hill	306	9.9	−7.1
Conservative	Alexander Wilkinson	227		
Majority		782	25.3	−8.7
Turnout		5,000	37.0	+4.1
Barnsley Ind. hold		Swing		
Barnsley Ind. hold		Swing	-4.3	

Penistone East
Party	Candidate	Votes	%	±%
Conservative	John Wilson	2,050	52.8	+3.8
Labour	Jill Hayler	827	21.3	−2.4
Liberal Democrats	Trish Arundel	654	16.8	+0.1
BNP	Kelly Thorpe	355	9.1	+9.1
Majority		1,223	31.5	+6.2
Turnout		3,886	41.4	+0.0
Conservative hold		Swing	+3.1	

Penistone West
Party	Candidate	Votes	%	±%
Conservative	Steve Webber	1,439	42.5	+1.5
Independent	Brenda Hinchcliff	654	19.3	−6.5
BNP	Paul James	550	16.2	+7.6
Labour	Peter Starling	447	13.2	−2.7
Green	Lynda Pickersgill	295	8.7	+0.0
Majority		785	23.2	+8.0
Turnout		3,385	39.7	−2.1
Conservative gain from Independent		Swing	-+4.0	

Rockingham
Party	Candidate	Votes	%	±%
Barnsley Ind.	Mary Brankin	1,336	42.1	−3.5
Labour	Alan Schofield	913	28.8	−13.8
BNP	Paul Richardson	343	10.8	+10.8
Conservative	Lesley Watkinson	296	9.3	−2.5
Liberal Democrats	Patrick Connell-Fothergill	159	5.0	+5.0
Independent	Bob Hannaghan	128	4.0	+4.0
Majority		423	13.3	+10.3
Turnout		3,175	37.0	+1.7
Barnsley Ind. hold		Swing	+5.1	

Royston
Party	Candidate	Votes	%	±%
Labour	Graham Kyte	1,202	46.9	+2.2
Liberal Democrats	Danny Oates	513	20.0	−1.3
BNP	Paul Harris	392	15.3	+2.0
Conservative	Garry Needham	263	10.3	+1.7
Barnsley Ind.	Daniel Pickering	195	7.6	−4.4
Majority		689	26.9	+3.5
Turnout		2,565	31.1	+0.8
Labour hold		Swing	+1.7	

St Helens
Party	Candidate	Votes	%	±%
Labour	Len Picken	965	46.0	−11.6
BNP	Lisa Brooksbank	635	30.3	+13.7
Independent	Dennis Kelk	299	14.2	−4.4
Conservative	Michael Toon	200	9.5	+2.4
Majority		330	15.7	−23.3
Turnout		2,099	26.5	+2.7
Labour hold		Swing	-12.6	

Stairfoot
Party	Candidate	Votes	%	±%
Barnsley Ind.	Fred Clowery	1,218	48.8	+20.7
Labour	Steve Redford	706	28.3	−13.2
BNP	Susan Harris	350	14.0	−0.8
Conservative	Clive Watkinson	224	9.0	+3.9
Majority		512	20.5	+7.2
Turnout		2,498	31.0	+0.3
Barnsley Ind. hold		Swing	+16.9	

Wombwell
Party	Candidate	Votes	%	±%
Labour	Margaret Morgan	1,200	48.9	−10.3
BNP	Lisa Goodricke	527	21.5	+7.0
Conservative	Keith Jenner	439	17.9	+6.3
Barnsley Ind.	Ray Murdoch	286	11.7	−3.0
Majority		673	27.4	−17.1
Turnout		2,452	28.9	−0.4
Labour hold		Swing	-8.6	

Worsbrough
Party	Candidate	Votes	%	±%
Barnsley Ind.	Gill Carr	1,264	48.1	+16.5
Labour	Terry Bristowe	926	35.3	+0.1
Liberal Democrats	Pat Durie	219	8.3	−2.0
Conservative	Peter Hamer	217	8.3	+2.8
Majority		338	12.8	+9.3
Turnout		2,626	34.7	+0.7
Barnsley Ind. gain from Labour		Swing	+8.2	

== By-elections between 2008 and 2010 ==
St. Helen's 15 October 2009 By-election
Party	Candidate	Votes	%	±%
Labour	Roy Butterwood	1,520	59.8	+13.8
BNP	Lisa Brooksbank	590	23.2	−7.1
Barnsley Ind.	Daniel Pickering	171	6.7	+6.7
UKIP	Neil Robinson	94	3.7	+3.7
Conservative	Clive Watkinson	83	3.5	−6.0
Liberal Democrats	Eddie Gouthwaite	78	3.1	+3.1
Majority		930	36.6	+20.9
Turnout		2,542	31.0	+4.5
Labour hold		Swing	+10.4	
