= 2002 Barnsley Metropolitan Borough Council election =

2002 UK local government election

← 2000	2 May 2002	2003 →

One third of seats (22 of 66) to Barnsley Metropolitan Borough Council 34 seats needed for a majority
	First party	Second party	Third party
Party	Labour	Independent	Conservative
Seats won	17	4	1
Seat change	▼3	▲2	▲1
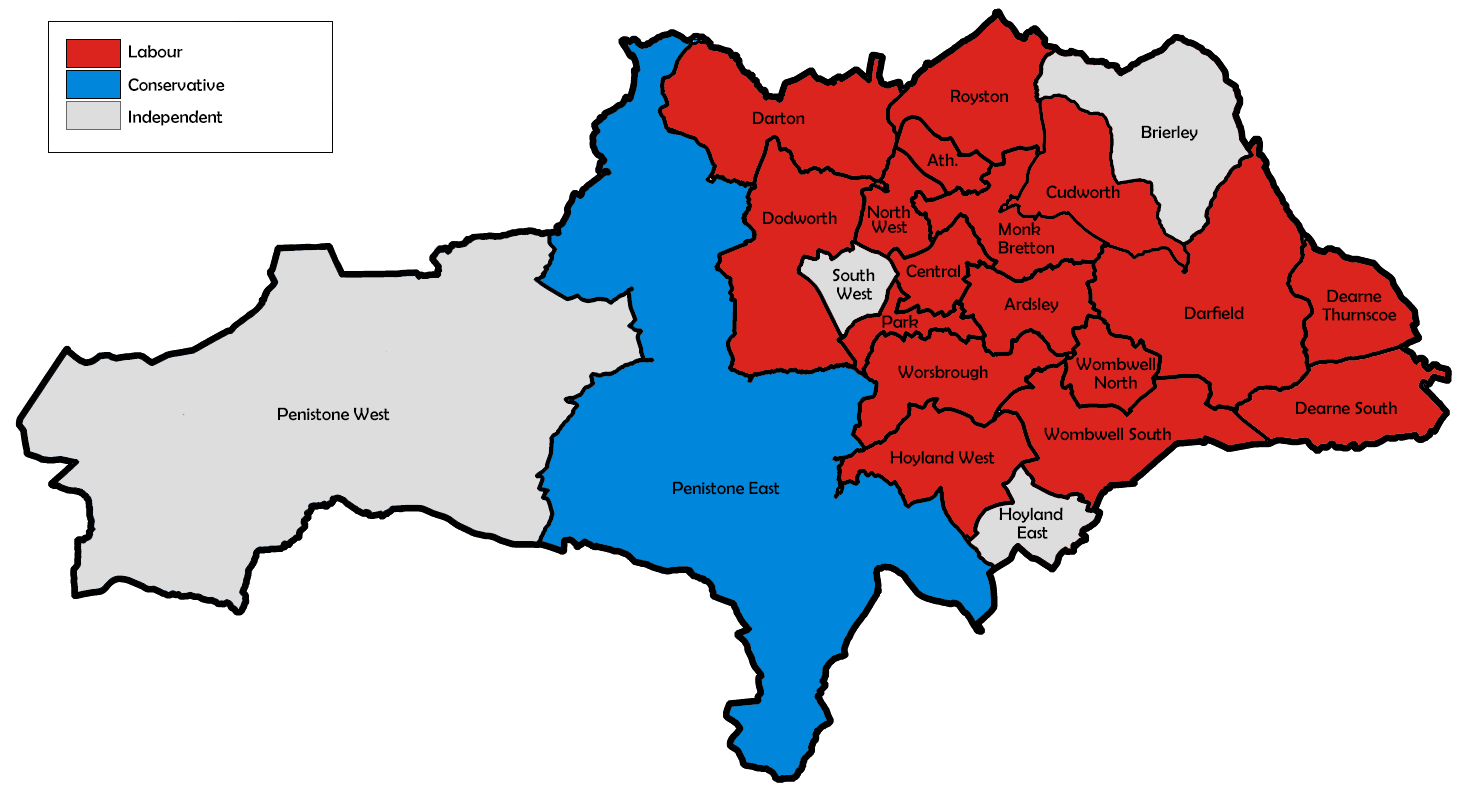
- Map showing the results of the 2002 Barnsley council elections.
Majority party before election
Labour
Majority party after election
Labour

The 2002 Barnsley Metropolitan Borough Council election took place on 2 May 2002 to elect members of Barnsley Metropolitan Borough Council in South Yorkshire, England. One third of the council was up for election and the Labour party stayed in overall control of the council.

== Election result ==
The results saw Labour keep a large majority despite losing seats to independents. Overall turnout in the election was 26%.

Barnsley Metropolitan Borough Council Election Result 2002
Party	Seats	Gains	Losses	Net gain/loss	Seats %	Votes %	Votes	+/−
Labour	17	1	4	-3	77.3	50.7	22,043	+5.1%
Independent	4	3	1	+2	18.2	22.1	9,596	+3.9%
Conservative	1	1	0	+1	4.5	8.2	3,547	-5.9%
Liberal Democrats	0	0	0	0	0	17.6	7,655	-0.5%
Socialist Labour	0	0	0	0	0	1.1	477	+0.9%
Socialist Alliance	0	0	0	0	0	0.4	163	+0.4%

This resulted in the following composition of the council:

Party	Previous council	New council
Labour	52	49
Independent	8	10
Conservatives	3	4
Liberal Democrats	3	3
Total	66	66
Working majority	38	32

== Ward results ==
+/- figures represent changes from the last time these wards were contested.

Ardsley
Party	Candidate	Votes	%	±%
Labour	Karen Dyson	708	46.3	−18.4
Independent	Trevor Hutchinson	606	39.6	+39.6
Liberal Democrats	Hazel Harding	118	7.7	−16.3
Conservative	Marjorie Cale-Morgan	72	4.7	−6.6
Socialist Labour	Margaret Holderness	26	1.7	+1.7
Majority		102	6.7	−34.0
Turnout		1,530	23.2	+7.6
Labour hold		Swing	-29.0	

Athersley
Party	Candidate	Votes	%	±%
Labour	Leonard Picken	759	60.8	+2.1
Independent	Jack Brown	313	25.1	−2.3
Liberal Democrats	Jean Roberts	118	9.5	−0.2
Conservative	William Barkworth	32	2.6	−1.6
Socialist Alliance	James White	26	2.1	+2.1
Majority		446	35.7	+4.4
Turnout		1,248	20.0	+2.8
Labour hold		Swing	+2.2	

Brierley
Party	Candidate	Votes	%	±%
Independent	Peter Middleton	838	41.8	+41.8
Labour	Christopher Sykes	832	41.5	−9.8
Independent	Kenneth Collins	180	9.0	−19.2
Conservative	Peter Murray	72	3.6	−7.1
Liberal Democrats	James McCready	68	3.4	−6.3
Socialist Labour	Olga Robinson	16	0.8	+0.8
Majority		6	0.3	−22.8
Turnout		2,006	30.5	+8.6
Independent gain from Labour		Swing	+25.8	

Central
Party	Candidate	Votes	%	±%
Labour	Michael Stokes	921	48.6	+9.8
Liberal Democrats	Dawn Jaques	765	40.4	−14.1
Conservative	Gordon Wilkinson	103	5.4	−1.3
Socialist Alliance	David Gibson	68	3.6	+3.6
Socialist Labour	Steven Yoxall	38	2.0	+2.0
Majority		156	8.2	−7.4
Turnout		1,895	23.0	+2.2
Labour hold		Swing	+11.9	

Cudworth
Party	Candidate	Votes	%	±%
Labour	Charles Wraith	1,343	69.5	+18.8
Independent	Pamela Staley	341	17.7	−21.4
Liberal Democrats	Riannon Rees	151	7.8	+2.5
Conservative	Anne Campbell	96	5.0	+0.2
Majority		1,002	51.9	+40.6
Turnout		1,931	25.0	−2.1
Labour hold		Swing	+20.1	

Darfield
Party	Candidate	Votes	%	±%
Labour	Terence Dixon	1,109	49.1	+9.5
Independent	Trevor Smith	874	38.7	−11.7
Liberal Democrats	Teresa Arundel	131	5.8	+1.1
Conservative	Richard Morrell	122	5.4	+0.1
Socialist Labour	Eric Mountain	22	1.0	+1.0
Majority		235	10.4	−0.5
Turnout		2,258	28.7	−2.8
Labour hold		Swing	+10.6	

Darton
Party	Candidate	Votes	%	±%
Labour	John Parkinson	1,416	54.2	+2.9
Independent	John Moore	618	23.6	−1.1
Liberal Democrats	Paul Jaques	366	14.0	+3.1
Conservative	Michael Toon	214	8.2	−5.0
Majority		798	30.5	+3.9
Turnout		2,614	24.1	+1.3
Labour hold		Swing	+2.0	

Dearne South
Party	Candidate	Votes	%	±%
Labour	Kenneth Sanderson	1,544	54.5	+1.5
Independent	Peter Stuart	625	22.1	+22.1
Liberal Democrats	Sharron Brook	621	21.9	−20.9
Conservative	Mavis Lockwood	41	1.4	−2.9
Majority		919	32.5	+22.3
Turnout		2,831	32.5	+8.0
Labour gain from Independent		Swing	-10.3	

Dearne Thurnscoe
Party	Candidate	Votes	%	±%
Labour	Alan Hancock	1,289	79.0	+6.2
Liberal Democrats	Michael Newton	343	21.0	+2.6
Majority		946	58.0	+3.6
Turnout		1,632	21.0	+4.2
Labour hold		Swing	+1.8	

Dodworth
Party	Candidate	Votes	%	±%
Labour	Christopher Jenkinson	1,306	55.2	+31.6
Liberal Democrats	Brian Roberts	552	23.4	+12.0
Conservative	George Hill	410	17.3	+3.4
Socialist Labour	Paul Hardman	96	4.1	+4.1
Majority		754	31.9	+7.0
Turnout		2,364	22.3	+0.6
Labour hold		Swing	+9.8	

Hoyland East
Party	Candidate	Votes	%	±%
Independent	Dennis Hawkins	934	41.0	−16.6
Labour	Timothy Shepherd	876	38.4	+8.2
Liberal Democrats	John Lopscombe	339	14.9	+8.3
Conservative	Marion Allerton	103	4.5	−1.1
Socialist Labour	Mary Smith	28	1.2	+1.2
Majority		58	2.5	−24.9
Turnout		2,280	28.4	+2.0
Independent gain from Labour		Swing	-12.4	

Hoyland West
Party	Candidate	Votes	%	±%
Labour	James Andrews	1,075	62.6	+3.0
Liberal Democrats	John Knight	298	17.3	−7.6
Conservative	Elizabeth Hill	162	9.4	−6.1
Independent	Kenneth Pickering	135	7.9	+7.9
Socialist Labour	Geoffrey Pickering	48	2.8	+2.8
Majority		777	45.2	+10.5
Turnout		1,718	26.4	+3.8
Labour hold		Swing	+5.3	

Monk Bretton
Party	Candidate	Votes	%	±%
Labour	Roy Robinson	1,020	59.2	+19.0
Independent	Miles Staley	374	21.7	−24.1
Liberal Democrats	Sally Brook	181	10.5	+2.2
Conservative	Stuart Wilkinson	110	6.4	+0.8
Socialist Labour	Maureen Stannard	39	2.3	+2.3
Majority		646	37.5	+31.9
Turnout		1,724	21.1	−3.1
Labour hold		Swing	+21.5	

North West
Party	Candidate	Votes	%	±%
Labour	Philip Davies	703	40.8	−9.3
Liberal Democrats	Anthony Conway	468	27.2	+1.2
Independent	William Gaunt	382	22.2	+22.2
Conservative	Clive Watkinson	103	6.0	−17.8
Socialist Labour	Philip Thompson	66	3.8	+3.8
Majority		235	13.6	−10.5
Turnout		1,722	25.0	+6.9
Labour hold		Swing	-5.2	

Park
Party	Candidate	Votes	%	±%
Labour	Alice Wade	568	45.3	−18.0
Independent	Malcolm Price	339	27.0	+27.0
Liberal Democrats	Pietro Politano	204	16.3	−8.3
Conservative	Geoffrey Turvey	74	5.9	−6.2
Socialist Alliance	Susan Wild	69	5.5	+5.5
Majority		229	18.3	−20.4
Turnout		1,254	23.5	+5.6
Labour hold		Swing	-22.5	

Penistone East
Party	Candidate	Votes	%	±%
Conservative	John Smith	1,107	39.9	−9.1
Labour	Peter Starling	879	31.7	−1.3
Liberal Democrats	Patrick Hensby	785	28.3	+10.3
Majority		228	8.2	−7.8
Turnout		2,771	34.7	+3.1
Conservative gain from Labour		Swing	-3.9	

Penistone West
Party	Candidate	Votes	%	±%
Independent	George Punt	1,788	68.9	+68.9
Labour	Linda Hutchinson	499	19.2	−6.2
Liberal Democrats	Jean Knight	309	11.9	+3.5
Majority		1,289	49.7	+19.6
Turnout		2,596	29.0	+1.5
Independent hold		Swing	+37.5	

Royston
Party	Candidate	Votes	%	±%
Labour	Graham Kyte	1,415	67.8	+16.8
Liberal Democrats	Edward Gouthwaite	498	23.9	−0.4
Conservative	Kathleen Leeds	174	8.3	+2.0
Majority		917	43.9	+17.2
Turnout		2,087	22.9	+0.7
Labour hold		Swing	+8.6	

South West
Party	Candidate	Votes	%	±%
Independent	Philip Birkinshaw	1,046	54.6	−9.8
Labour	Robert Hannaghan	566	29.5	+9.4
Liberal Democrats	Yvonne Marrison	165	8.6	+1.8
Conservative	John Wilson	139	7.3	−1.5
Majority		480	25.1	−19.2
Turnout		1,916	26.7	+0.8
Independent gain from Labour		Swing	-9.6	

Wombwell North
Party	Candidate	Votes	%	±%
Labour	Arthur Hall	676	47.0	+8.7
Liberal Democrats	Christopher Harding	519	36.1	−22.8
Independent	Angela Thorp	203	14.1	+14.1
Conservative	Nancy Cuss	40	2.8	+0.0
Majority		157	10.9	−9.6
Turnout		1,438	29.0	−1.2
Labour hold		Swing	+15.7	

Wombwell South
Party	Candidate	Votes	%	±%
Labour	Trevor Naylor	1,329	71.1	+16.2
Liberal Democrats	William Millard	352	18.8	+5.7
Conservative	Howard Oldfield	187	10.0	+1.6
Majority		977	52.3	+17.4
Turnout		1,868	23.3	−1.2
Labour hold		Swing	+5.2	

Worsbrough
Party	Candidate	Votes	%	±%
Labour	Terence Bristowe	1,210	67.3	+5.7
Liberal Democrats	Patricia Durie	304	16.9	+3.2
Conservative	Elizabeth Elders	186	10.3	+0.1
Socialist Labour	Terence Robinson	98	5.5	+0.3
Majority		906	50.4	+2.5
Turnout		1,798	24.2	+0.5
Labour hold		Swing	+1.2	
