= 2006 Barnsley Metropolitan Borough Council election =

2006 UK local government election

| ← 2004 | 4 May 2006 | 2007 → |

One third of seats (21 of 63) to Barnsley Metropolitan Borough Council 32 seats needed for a majority
| | First party | Second party | Third party |
|---|---|---|---|
| Party | Labour | Barnsley Ind. | Conservative |
| Seats won | 12 | 7 | 3 |
| Seat change | ▲1 | Steady | Steady |
| Popular vote | 20,986 | 15,144 | 7,207 |
| Percentage | 38.3% | 27.7% | 13.2% |
| Swing | ▲1.9% | ▲27.7% | ▼1.1% |
- Map of the 2006 Barnsley council election results. Labour in red, Barnsley Independents in teal and Conservatives in blue.
Majority party before election
Labour
Majority party after election
Labour

The 2006 Barnsley Metropolitan Borough Council election took place on 4 May 2006 to elect members of Barnsley Metropolitan Borough Council in South Yorkshire, England. One third of the council was up for election, with an extra vacancy in Penistone East caused by a resignation, and the Labour Party stayed in overall control of the council.

== Background ==
The Barnsley Independent Group, which had been formed by independents on the council, were contesting an election for the first time. They put up candidates in 17 of the 21 wards which had seats up for election and 7 of their councillors were defending seats.

== Election results ==
The results saw Labour stay in control of the council, making a net gain of 1 to hold 34 seats.

Barnsley Metropolitan Borough Council Election Result 2006
| Party | Seats | Gains | Losses | Net gain/loss | Seats % | Votes % | Votes | +/− |
|---|---|---|---|---|---|---|---|---|
| Labour | 12 | 2 | 1 | +1 | 54.5 | 38.4 | 20,986 | +2.0 |
| Barnsley Ind. | 7 | 1 | 1 | 0 | 31.8 | 27.7 | 15,144 | +27.7 |
| Conservative | 3 | 0 | 0 | 0 | 13.6 | 13.2 | 7,207 | -1.1 |
| BNP | 0 | 0 | 0 | 0 | 0.0 | 8.2 | 4,462 | +1.3 |
| Liberal Democrats | 0 | 0 | 1 | -1 | 0.0 | 8.0 | 4,393 | -5.2 |
| Independent | 0 | 0 | 0 | 0 | 0.0 | 4.1 | 2,251 | -25.0 |
| Green | 0 | 0 | 0 | 0 | 0.0 | 0.5 | 281 | +0.5 |

This resulted in the following composition of the council:

| Party | Previous council | New council |
|---|---|---|
| Labour | 33 | 34 |
| Barnsley Independent | 22 | 22 |
| Conservatives | 5 | 5 |
| Liberal Democrats | 3 | 2 |
| Total | 63 | 63 |
| Working majority | 3 | 5 |

== Ward results ==
+/- figures represent changes from the last time these wards were contested.

Central
| Party | Candidate | Votes | % | ±% |
|---|---|---|---|---|
| Labour | Margaret Bruff | 910 | 40.2 | +5.0 |
| Liberal Democrats | Donovan Hutton | 527 | 23.3 | −18.0 |
| BNP | Dennis Seilly | 347 | 15.3 | +1.0 |
| Independent | Peter Doyle | 327 | 14.4 | +14.4 |
| Conservative | Gillian Millner | 155 | 6.8 | −2.3 |
| Majority | | 383 | 16.9 | +10.8 |
| Turnout | | 2,266 | 30.4 | −4.4 |
| Labour gain from Liberal Democrats | | Swing | +11.5 | |

Cudworth
| Party | Candidate | Votes | % | ±% |
|---|---|---|---|---|
| Labour | Joseph Hayward | 1,413 | 57.4 | +6.0 |
| Barnsley Ind. | Ian Sanders | 900 | 36.6 | +36.6 |
| Conservative | Jean Rowley | 149 | 6.1 | +0.3 |
| Majority | | 513 | 20.8 | −8.6 |
| Turnout | | 2,462 | 31.4 | −6.8 |
| Labour hold | | Swing | -15.3 | |

Darfield
| Party | Candidate | Votes | % | ±% |
|---|---|---|---|---|
| Barnsley Ind. | Trevor Smith | 1,112 | 44.4 | +44.4 |
| Labour | Caroline Saunders | 711 | 28.4 | −1.9 |
| BNP | Paul Tibble | 332 | 13.3 | +5.8 |
| Liberal Democrats | Susan Garner | 182 | 7.3 | −1.0 |
| Conservative | Marjorie Cale-Morgan | 168 | 6.7 | −0.2 |
| Majority | | 401 | 16.0 | −0.8 |
| Turnout | | 2,505 | 32.9 | −7.5 |
| Barnsley Ind. hold | | Swing | +23.1 | |

Darton East
| Party | Candidate | Votes | % | ±% |
|---|---|---|---|---|
| Barnsley Ind. | Harry Spence | 1,249 | 45.8 | +45.8 |
| Labour | Thomas Cullum | 808 | 29.6 | −6.3 |
| Conservative | Clive Watkinson | 396 | 14.5 | −6.0 |
| Liberal Democrats | Patrick Logan | 274 | 10.0 | −2.6 |
| Majority | | 441 | 16.2 | +3.1 |
| Turnout | | 2,727 | 33.1 | −5.5 |
| Barnsley Ind. gain from Labour | | Swing | +26.0 | |

Darton West
| Party | Candidate | Votes | % | ±% |
|---|---|---|---|---|
| Labour | Sharon Howard | 935 | 32.0 | +1.3 |
| Barnsley Ind. | Susan Simmons | 853 | 29.2 | +29.2 |
| BNP | Ian Sutton | 701 | 24.0 | +14.0 |
| Conservative | Tony Short | 431 | 14.8 | −1.8 |
| Majority | | 82 | 2.8 | −0.3 |
| Turnout | | 2,920 | 36.0 | −4.8 |
| Labour gain from Barnsley Ind. | | Swing | -13.9 | |

Dearne North
| Party | Candidate | Votes | % | ±% |
|---|---|---|---|---|
| Labour | Janice Hancock | 1,011 | 55.3 | +6.6 |
| Liberal Democrats | Ian Garner | 453 | 24.8 | −14.6 |
| Barnsley Ind. | Raymond Murdoch | 234 | 12.8 | +12.8 |
| Conservative | Paul Buckley | 129 | 7.1 | −4.8 |
| Majority | | 558 | 30.5 | +21.1 |
| Turnout | | 1,827 | 23.3 | −9.1 |
| Labour hold | | Swing | +10.6 | |

Dearne South
| Party | Candidate | Votes | % | ±% |
|---|---|---|---|---|
| Labour | May Noble | 1,158 | 41.5 | −4.5 |
| Liberal Democrats | Sarah Brook-Gardiner | 1,065 | 38.2 | −8.3 |
| BNP | Robert Garrett | 491 | 17.6 | +17.6 |
| Conservative | Dorothy Shaw | 75 | 2.7 | −4.8 |
| Majority | | 93 | 3.3 | +2.8 |
| Turnout | | 2,789 | 32.1 | −5.7 |
| Labour hold | | Swing | +1.9 | |

Dodworth
| Party | Candidate | Votes | % | ±% |
|---|---|---|---|---|
| Barnsley Ind. | John Carr | 1,378 | 48.1 | +48.1 |
| Labour | Deborah Dunlop | 1,018 | 35.6 | +8.7 |
| Conservative | George Hill | 466 | 16.3 | +2.9 |
| Majority | | 360 | 12.6 | −20.3 |
| Turnout | | 2,862 | 37.1 | −7.6 |
| Barnsley Ind. hold | | Swing | +19.7 | |

Hoyland Milton
| Party | Candidate | Votes | % | ±% |
|---|---|---|---|---|
| Barnsley Ind. | Trevor Naylor | 1,229 | 47.4 | +47.4 |
| Labour | Robin Franklin | 1,088 | 42.0 | +8.0 |
| Conservative | Elizabeth Hill | 276 | 10.6 | +0.0 |
| Majority | | 141 | 5.4 | −16.2 |
| Turnout | | 2,593 | 30.5 | −9.1 |
| Barnsley Ind. hold | | Swing | +19.7 | |

Kingstone
| Party | Candidate | Votes | % | ±% |
|---|---|---|---|---|
| Barnsley Ind. | Donna Hollins | 1,154 | 53.5 | +53.5 |
| Labour | Alice Cave | 721 | 33.4 | −5.4 |
| Independent | Frank Watson | 148 | 6.9 | −45.3 |
| Conservative | Stuart Wilkinson | 135 | 6.3 | −2.7 |
| Majority | | 433 | 20.1 | +6.8 |
| Turnout | | 2,158 | 28.4 | −5.6 |
| Barnsley Ind. hold | | Swing | +29.4 | |

Monk Bretton
| Party | Candidate | Votes | % | ±% |
|---|---|---|---|---|
| Labour | Kenneth Richardson | 906 | 40.3 | +3.1 |
| Barnsley Ind. | Michael Dunlavey | 557 | 24.8 | +24.8 |
| BNP | Susan Harris | 323 | 14.4 | +3.9 |
| Liberal Democrats | Kenneth Smith | 277 | 12.3 | +12.3 |
| Conservative | Geoffrey Turvey | 185 | 8.2 | −2.5 |
| Majority | | 349 | 15.5 | +11.0 |
| Turnout | | 2,248 | 28.3 | −7.3 |
| Labour hold | | Swing | -10.8 | |

North East
| Party | Candidate | Votes | % | ±% |
|---|---|---|---|---|
| Labour | Leah Higginbottom | 1,680 | 69.9 | +19.6 |
| Conservative | Lesley Watkinson | 725 | 30.1 | +21.3 |
| Majority | | 955 | 39.7 | +18.6 |
| Turnout | | 2,405 | 27.2 | −11.4 |
| Labour hold | | Swing | -0.8 | |

Old Town
| Party | Candidate | Votes | % | ±% |
|---|---|---|---|---|
| Barnsley Ind. | Peter Middleton | 1,479 | 56.6 | +56.6 |
| Labour | Martin Dyson | 633 | 24.2 | −1.0 |
| BNP | Lancer White | 299 | 11.4 | +3.9 |
| Conservative | Grace Morrell | 203 | 7.8 | +1.4 |
| Majority | | 846 | 32.4 | +14.6 |
| Turnout | | 2,614 | 32.7 | −8.0 |
| Barnsley Ind. hold | | Swing | +28.8 | |

Penistone East (2)
| Party | Candidate | Votes | % | ±% |
|---|---|---|---|---|
| Conservative | Robert Barnard | 1,539 | 32.6 | −8.2 |
| Conservative | John Wilson | 1,518 | | |
| Labour | Jill Hayler | 929 | 19.7 | −7.3 |
| Labour | William Jones | 838 | | |
| Liberal Democrats | Teresa Arundel | 808 | 17.1 | −6.0 |
| Independent | John Smith | 749 | 15.9 | +15.9 |
| Barnsley Ind. | Lisa Murdoch | 691 | 14.7 | +14.7 |
| Majority | | 610 | 12.9 | −0.9 |
| Turnout | | 7,072 | 41.4 | −6.8 |
| Conservative hold | | Swing | | |
| Conservative hold | | Swing | -0.4 | |

Penistone West
| Party | Candidate | Votes | % | ±% |
|---|---|---|---|---|
| Conservative | Andrew Milner | 1,012 | 31.0 | −3.6 |
| Barnsley Ind. | Paul Hand-Davis | 808 | 24.8 | +24.8 |
| Labour | Joseph Unsworth | 763 | 23.4 | +0.6 |
| BNP | Kelly Thorpe | 399 | 12.2 | +3.5 |
| Green | Lynda Pickersgill | 281 | 8.6 | +8.6 |
| Majority | | 204 | 6.3 | +5.6 |
| Turnout | | 3,263 | 39.1 | −7.3 |
| Conservative hold | | Swing | -14.2 | |

Rockingham
| Party | Candidate | Votes | % | ±% |
|---|---|---|---|---|
| Labour | James Andrews | 1,255 | 46.2 | +7.6 |
| Barnsley Ind. | Alison Robinson | 846 | 31.1 | +31.1 |
| Independent | Robert Hannagan | 320 | 11.8 | −29.5 |
| Conservative | Michael Toon | 297 | 10.9 | +1.4 |
| Majority | | 409 | 15.0 | +12.3 |
| Turnout | | 2,718 | 32.0 | −9.9 |
| Labour hold | | Swing | -11.7 | |

Royston
| Party | Candidate | Votes | % | ±% |
|---|---|---|---|---|
| Labour | Tim Cheetham | 959 | 39.1 | −4.6 |
| Barnsley Ind. | John Race | 464 | 18.9 | +18.9 |
| Liberal Democrats | Edward Gouthwaite | 437 | 17.8 | +17.8 |
| BNP | Paul Harris | 393 | 16.0 | +2.1 |
| Conservative | Andrew Barr | 197 | 8.0 | −6.8 |
| Majority | | 495 | 20.2 | +4.0 |
| Turnout | | 2,450 | 30.3 | −4.9 |
| Labour hold | | Swing | -11.7 | |

St. Helen's
| Party | Candidate | Votes | % | ±% |
|---|---|---|---|---|
| Labour | David Bostwick | 905 | 50.0 | +11.9 |
| Independent | Jack Brown | 707 | 39.1 | +2.8 |
| Conservative | Jack Orr | 197 | 10.9 | +5.5 |
| Majority | | 198 | 10.9 | +9.0 |
| Turnout | | 1,809 | 23.7 | −7.0 |
| Labour hold | | Swing | +4.5 | |

Stairfoot
| Party | Candidate | Votes | % | ±% |
|---|---|---|---|---|
| Barnsley Ind. | James Smith | 1,014 | 41.8 | +41.8 |
| Labour | Steven Redford | 871 | 35.9 | −5.1 |
| BNP | James Smith | 386 | 15.9 | +15.9 |
| Conservative | Anne Campbell | 154 | 6.4 | +0.5 |
| Majority | | 143 | 5.9 | +5.9 |
| Turnout | | 2,425 | 31.1 | −6.1 |
| Barnsley Ind. hold | | Swing | +23.4 | |

Wombwell
| Party | Candidate | Votes | % | ±% |
|---|---|---|---|---|
| Labour | Denise Wilde | 1,347 | 53.2 | +16.7 |
| Barnsley Ind. | Arthur O'Loughlin | 610 | 24.1 | +24.1 |
| BNP | David Bailey | 396 | 15.6 | +4.9 |
| Conservative | Garry Needham | 179 | 7.1 | −3.0 |
| Majority | | 737 | 29.1 | +15.3 |
| Turnout | | 2,532 | 31.6 | −5.2 |
| Labour hold | | Swing | -3.7 | |

Worsbrough
| Party | Candidate | Votes | % | ±% |
|---|---|---|---|---|
| Labour | Eunice Taylor | 965 | 39.6 | −2.0 |
| Barnsley Ind. | Jillian Aranyi | 566 | 23.2 | +23.2 |
| BNP | Malcolm Jennings | 395 | 16.2 | +16.2 |
| Liberal Democrats | Patricia Durie | 370 | 15.2 | −7.2 |
| Conservative | Elizabeth Elders | 139 | 5.7 | −9.1 |
| Majority | | 399 | 16.4 | −2.8 |
| Turnout | | 2,435 | 33.1 | −6.6 |
| Labour hold | | Swing | -12.6 | |

== By-elections between 2006 and 2007 ==
Penistone West 13 July 2006 By-election
| Party | Candidate | Votes | % | ±% |
|---|---|---|---|---|
| Conservative | Stephen Marsh | 897 | 50.3 | +19.3 |
| Labour | Joseph Unsworth | 558 | 31.3 | +7.9 |
| Green | Lynda Pickersgill | 328 | 18.4 | +9.8 |
| Majority | | 339 | 19.0 | +12.7 |
| Turnout | | 1,783 | 21.4 | −17.7 |
| Conservative gain from Independent | | Swing | +5.7 | |

Worsborough 16 November 2006 By-election
| Party | Candidate | Votes | % | ±% |
|---|---|---|---|---|
| Labour | Betty Barlow | 615 | 37.0 | −2.6 |
| Barnsley Ind. | Jillian Aranyi | 510 | 30.7 | +7.5 |
| BNP | Malcolm Jennings | 310 | 18.6 | +2.4 |
| Liberal Democrats | Donald Wood | 137 | 8.2 | −7.0 |
| Respect | Kate Burland | 91 | 5.5 | +5.5 |
| Majority | | 105 | 6.3 | −10.1 |
| Turnout | | 1,663 | 22.0 | −11.1 |
| Labour hold | | Swing | -5.0 | |
