= 2003 Barnsley Metropolitan Borough Council election =

2003 UK local government election

← 2002	1 May 2003	2004 →

One third of seats (22 of 66) to Barnsley Metropolitan Borough Council 34 seats needed for a majority
	First party	Second party	Third party
Party	Labour	Independent	Conservative
Seats won	16	2	2
Seat change	▼2	Steady	▲1
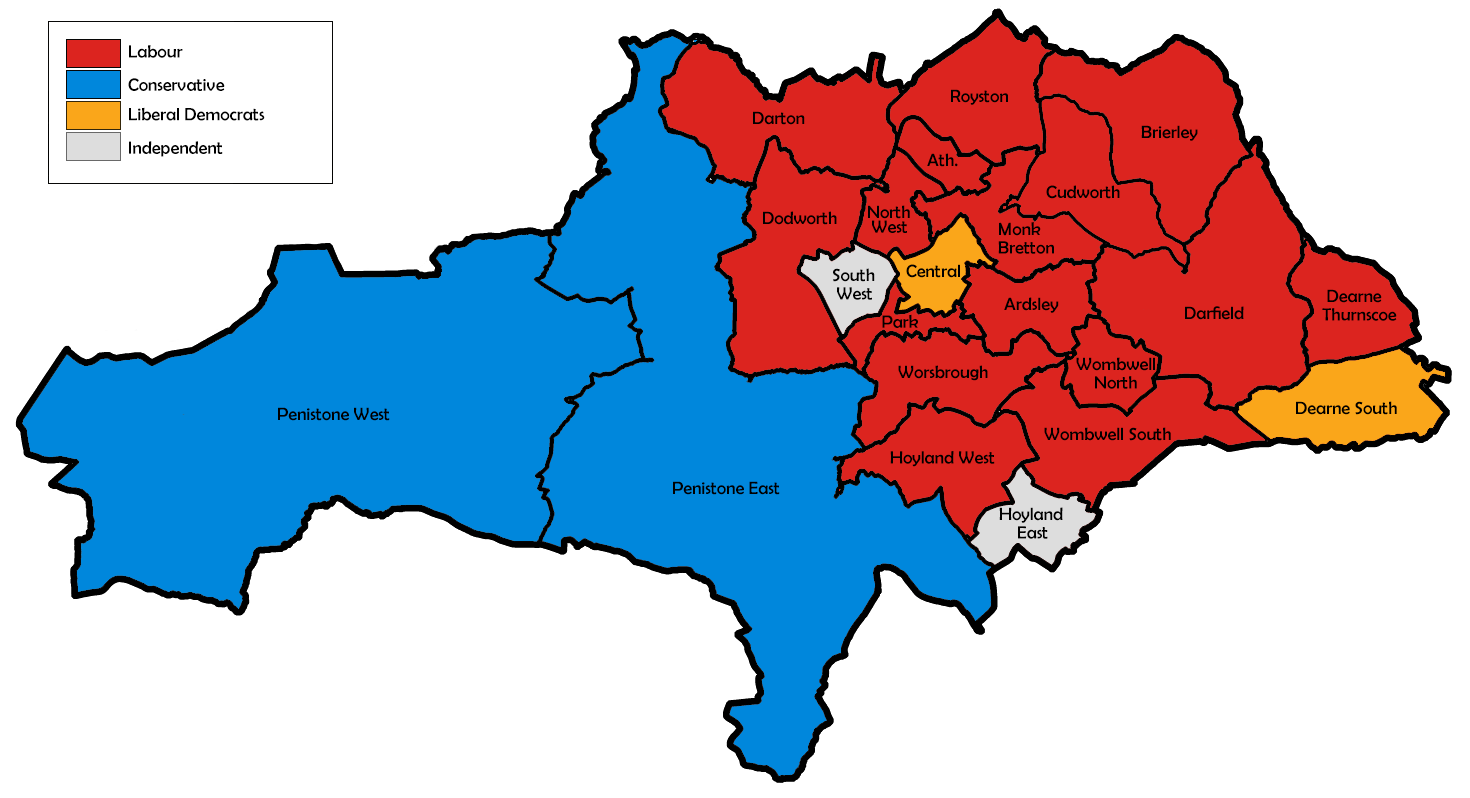
- Map showing the results of the 2003 Barnsley council elections.
Majority party before election
Labour
Majority party after election
Labour

The 2003 Barnsley Metropolitan Borough Council election took place on 1 May 2003 to elect members of Barnsley Metropolitan Borough Council in South Yorkshire, England. One third of the council was up for election and the Labour party stayed in overall control of the council.

== Election result ==
Overall turnout in the election was 24%.

Barnsley Metropolitan Borough Council Election Result 2003
Party	Seats	Gains	Losses	Net gain/loss	Seats %	Votes %	Votes	+/−
Labour	16	1	3	-2	72.7	50.1	20,250	-0.6%
Independent	2	1	1	0	9.1	22.2	8,960	+0.1%
Conservative	2	1	0	+1	9.1	15.2	6,147	+7.0%
Liberal Democrats	2	1	0	+1	9.1	10.8	4,370	-6.8%
BNP	0	0	0	0	0	1.0	392	+1.0%
Socialist Alliance	0	0	0	0	0	0.5	218	+0.1%
Socialist Alternative	0	0	0	0	0	0.2	73	+0.2%

This resulted in the following composition of the council:

Party	Previous council	New council
Labour	49	47
Independent	10	10
Conservatives	4	5
Liberal Democrats	3	4
Total	66	66
Working majority	32	28

== Ward results ==
+/- figures represent changes from the last time these wards were contested.

Ardsley
Party	Candidate	Votes	%	±%
Labour	Steven Redford	723	48.2	+1.9
Independent	James Smith	687	45.8	+6.2
Conservative	Peter Murray	91	6.1	+1.4
Majority		36	2.4	−4.3
Turnout		1,501	23.3	+0.1
Labour hold		Swing	-2.1	

Athersley
Party	Candidate	Votes	%	±%
Labour	Patricia Newman	710	62.4	+1.6
Independent	Malcolm Beaumont	243	21.4	−3.7
Liberal Democrats	Jean Roberts	132	11.6	+2.1
Conservative	Gordon Wilkinson	53	4.7	+2.1
Majority		467	41.0	+5.3
Turnout		1,138	18.6	−1.4
Labour hold		Swing	+2.6	

Brierley
Party	Candidate	Votes	%	±%
Labour	Alex Vodden	1,119	52.9	+11.4
Independent	Frank Hardy	912	43.1	+1.3
Conservative	Anne Campbell	86	4.1	+0.5
Majority		207	9.8	+9.5
Turnout		2,117	31.6	+1.1
Labour hold		Swing	+5.0	

Central
Party	Candidate	Votes	%	±%
Liberal Democrats	Ian Guest	876	50.0	+9.6
Labour	Peter Keys	717	40.9	−7.7
Conservative	Brent Wood	118	6.7	+1.3
Socialist Alliance	Thomas Sutcliffe	41	2.3	−1.3
Majority		159	9.1	+0.9
Turnout		1,752	21.5	−1.5
Liberal Democrats hold		Swing	+8.6	

Cudworth
Party	Candidate	Votes	%	±%
Labour	Joseph Hayward	1,325	82.5	+13.0
Conservative	Elizabeth Hill	281	17.5	+12.5
Majority		1,044	65.0	+13.1
Turnout		1,606	20.7	−4.3
Labour hold		Swing	+0.2	

Darfield
Party	Candidate	Votes	%	±%
Labour	Gillian Bates	1,001	46.7	−2.4
Independent	Trevor Smith	867	40.4	+1.7
Liberal Democrats	Teresa Arundel	143	6.7	+0.9
Conservative	Howard Oldfield	134	6.2	+0.8
Majority		134	6.2	−4.2
Turnout		2,145	26.9	−1.8
Labour hold		Swing	-2.0	

Darton
Party	Candidate	Votes	%	±%
Labour	Thomas Cullum	1,256	50.4	−3.8
Conservative	Robert Barnard	594	23.8	+15.6
Independent	John Moore	444	17.8	−5.8
BNP	Andrew Gedney	199	8.0	+8.0
Majority		662	26.6	−3.9
Turnout		2,493	23.1	−1.0
Labour hold		Swing	-9.7	

Dearne South
Party	Candidate	Votes	%	±%
Liberal Democrats	Sharron Brook	1,027	49.4	+27.5
Labour	Ann Cross	1,000	48.1	−6.4
Conservative	Garry Needham	51	2.5	+1.1
Majority		27	1.3	−31.2
Turnout		2,078	23.9	−8.6
Liberal Democrats gain from Labour		Swing	+16.9	

Dearne Thurnscoe
Party	Candidate	Votes	%	±%
Labour	Alan Gardiner	1,014	83.3	+4.3
Conservative	Grace Morrell	203	16.7	+16.7
Majority		811	66.6	+8.6
Turnout		1,217	15.6	−5.4
Labour hold		Swing	-6.2	

Dodworth
Party	Candidate	Votes	%	±%
Labour	Phillip Lofts	1,196	52.0	−3.2
Independent	Maureen Smith	667	29.0	+29.0
Conservative	George Hill	439	19.1	+1.8
Majority		529	23.0	−8.9
Turnout		2,302	22.0	−0.3
Labour hold		Swing	-16.1	

Hoyland East
Party	Candidate	Votes	%	±%
Independent	Mary Brankin	1,295	57.7	+16.7
Labour	Patricia Wordsworth	751	33.4	−5.0
Conservative	Tony Short	200	8.9	+4.4
Majority		544	24.2	+21.7
Turnout		2,246	27.7	−0.7
Independent gain from Labour		Swing	+10.8	

Hoyland West
Party	Candidate	Votes	%	±%
Labour	Alan Schofield	864	42.7	−19.9
Independent	Geoffrey Howell	751	37.1	+29.2
Independent	Mehdi Ghaffarian	264	13.1	+13.1
Conservative	Michael Toon	143	7.1	−2.3
Majority		113	5.6	−39.6
Turnout		2,022	30.5	+4.1
Labour hold		Swing	-24.5	

Monk Bretton
Party	Candidate	Votes	%	±%
Labour	Margaret Sheard	934	52.1	−7.1
Liberal Democrats	Patrick Logan	282	15.7	+5.2
Independent	Michael Moore	267	14.9	−6.8
BNP	Paul Harris	193	10.8	+10.8
Conservative	Stuart Wilkinson	117	6.5	+0.1
Majority		652	36.4	−1.1
Turnout		1,793	22.2	+1.1
Labour hold		Swing	-6.1	

North West
Party	Candidate	Votes	%	±%
Labour	Margaret Cawthorne	629	41.4	+0.6
Independent	William Gaunt	520	34.2	+12.0
Liberal Democrats	Anthony Conway	245	16.1	−11.1
Conservative	Clive Watkinson	127	8.3	+2.3
Majority		109	7.2	−6.4
Turnout		1,521	21.9	−3.1
Labour hold		Swing	-5.7	

Park
Party	Candidate	Votes	%	±%
Labour	Brian Swaine	681	67.5	+22.2
Socialist Alliance	Susan Wild	177	17.5	+12.0
Conservative	Geoffrey Turvey	151	15.0	+9.1
Majority		504	50.0	+31.7
Turnout		1,009	18.9	−4.6
Labour hold		Swing	+5.1	

Penistone East
Party	Candidate	Votes	%	±%
Conservative	Deborah Toon	1,477	56.6	+16.7
Labour	Jill Hayler	1,134	43.4	+11.7
Majority		343	13.1	+4.9
Turnout		2,611	32.1	−2.6
Conservative hold		Swing	+2.5	

Penistone West
Party	Candidate	Votes	%	±%
Conservative	John Wilson	1,212	51.6	+51.6
Labour	Joseph Unsworth	1,136	48.4	+29.2
Majority		76	3.2	−46.5
Turnout		2,348	26.3	−2.7
Conservative gain from Labour		Swing	+11.2	

Royston
Party	Candidate	Votes	%	±%
Labour	Howard Lavender	1,015	55.6	−12.2
Liberal Democrats	Leslie Brooke	656	35.9	+12.0
Conservative	Nancy Cuss	156	8.5	+0.2
Majority		359	19.6	−24.3
Turnout		1,827	19.9	−3.0
Labour hold		Swing	-12.1	

South West
Party	Candidate	Votes	%	±%
Independent	Malcolm Hall	1,043	61.7	+7.1
Labour	Stephen Henshaw	461	27.3	−2.2
Conservative	Andrew Barr	187	11.1	+3.8
Majority		582	34.4	+9.3
Turnout		1,691	23.4	−3.3
Independent hold		Swing	+4.6	

Wombwell North
Party	Candidate	Votes	%	±%
Labour	Richard Wraith	780	57.1	+10.1
Liberal Democrats	Christopher Harding	521	38.1	+2.0
Conservative	Timothy Allerton	66	4.8	+2.0
Majority		259	18.9	+8.0
Turnout		1,367	27.7	−1.3
Labour hold		Swing	+4.0	

Wombwell South
Party	Candidate	Votes	%	±%
Labour	Denise Wilde	889	48.1	−23.0
Independent	Paul Spivey	561	30.4	+30.4
Liberal Democrats	Edward Gouthwaite	180	9.7	−9.1
Conservative	Marion Allerton	144	7.8	−2.2
Socialist Alternative	Angela Waller	73	4.0	+4.0
Majority		328	17.8	−34.5
Turnout		1,847	22.8	−0.5
Labour gain from Independent		Swing	-26.7	

Worsbrough
Party	Candidate	Votes	%	±%
Labour	Fred Wright	915	51.4	−15.9
Independent	Donald Wood	439	24.7	+24.7
Liberal Democrats	Patricia Durie	308	17.3	+0.4
Conservative	Elizabeth Elders	117	6.6	−3.7
Majority		476	26.8	−23.6
Turnout		1,779	23.9	−0.3
Labour hold		Swing	-20.3	
