= 2007 Barnsley Metropolitan Borough Council election =

2007 UK local government election

← 2006	3 May 2007	2008 →

One third of seats (21 of 63) to Barnsley Metropolitan Borough Council 32 seats needed for a majority
	First party	Second party	Third party
Party	Labour	Barnsley Ind.	Conservative
Seats won	12	7	2
Seat change	▼2	▲2	Steady
- Map of the 2007 Barnsley council election results. Labour in red, Barnsley Independents in teal and Conservatives in blue.
Majority party before election
Labour
Majority party after election
Labour

The 2007 Barnsley Metropolitan Borough Council election took place on 3 May 2007 to elect members of Barnsley Metropolitan Borough Council in South Yorkshire, England. One third of the council was up for election and the Labour Party stayed in overall control of the council.

== Background ==
Prior to the election, a number of Barnsley Independent Group councillors had removed themselves from the grouping and sat as Independent. Those Independents had earlier lost a seat in a Penistone by-election to the Conservatives, and suffered a defection to Labour in St. Helens. The Conservatives had also suffered a defection to the BIG in Penistone West.

== Election results ==
The results saw Labour retain a majority of 3 with 33 councillors, after losing 2 seats to the Barnsley Independent Group. The Barnsley Independent Group moved to 20 seats after ousting 2 long time Labour councillors Alan Schofield and Alex Vodden. The Conservatives remained on 5 seats, the Liberal Democrats 2 and 3 councillors were non-aligned. The British National Party failed to win any seats, but did come second in the wards of Central, Dearne North and Darton West. Overall turnout increased slightly to 33%.

Barnsley Metropolitan Borough Council Election Result 2007
Party	Seats	Gains	Losses	Net gain/loss	Seats %	Votes %	Votes	+/−
Labour	12	0	2	-2	57.1	39.2	22,589	+0.8
Barnsley Ind.	7	2	0	+2	33.3	23.8	13,712	-3.9
Conservative	2	0	0	0	9.5	14.1	8,110	+0.9
BNP	0	0	0	0	0.0	13.6	7,822	+5.4
Liberal Democrats	0	0	0	0	0.0	5.6	3,235	-2.4
Independent	0	0	0	0	0.0	3.3	1,881	-0.8
Green	0	0	0	0	0.0	0.5	307	+0.0

This resulted in the following composition of the council:

Party	Previous council	New council
Labour	35	33
Barnsley Independent	19	21
Conservatives	5	5
Liberal Democrats	2	2
Independent	2	2
Total	63	63
Working majority	7	3

== Ward results ==
+/- figures represent changes from the last time these wards were contested.

Central
Party	Candidate	Votes	%	±%
Labour	Mike Stokes	1,035	43.2	+3.0
BNP	Peter Marshall	618	25.8	+10.5
Barnsley Ind.	Anita Cherryholme	538	22.5	+22.5
Conservative	Geoffrey Turvey	204	8.5	+1.7
Majority		417	17.4	+0.5
Turnout		2,395	30.8	+0.4
Labour hold		Swing	-3.7	

Cudworth
Party	Candidate	Votes	%	±%
Labour	Charlie Wraith	1,627	74.5	+17.1
Conservative	Elizabeth Elders	556	25.5	+19.4
Majority		1,071	49.1	+28.3
Turnout		2,183	27.3	−4.1
Labour hold		Swing	-1.1	

Darfield
Party	Candidate	Votes	%	±%
Barnsley Ind.	David Wainwright	1,191	44.9	+0.5
Labour	Brian Mathers	772	29.1	+0.7
BNP	Paul Tibble	355	13.4	+0.1
Conservative	Andrea Punshon	175	6.6	−0.1
Liberal Democrats	Susan Garner	158	6.0	−1.3
Majority		419	15.8	−0.2
Turnout		2,651	33.7	+0.8
Barnsley Ind. hold		Swing	-0.1	

Darton East
Party	Candidate	Votes	%	±%
Labour	Roy Miller	1,251	40.0	+10.4
Barnsley Ind.	Eric Powers	556	17.8	−28.0
BNP	Colin Porter	539	17.2	+17.2
Conservative	Howard Pearson	421	13.5	−1.0
Independent	John Race	361	11.5	+11.5
Majority		695	22.2	+6.0
Turnout		3,128	37.1	+4.0
Labour hold		Swing	+19.2	

Darton West
Party	Candidate	Votes	%	±%
Labour	Linda Burgess	1,427	43.0	+11.0
BNP	Ian Sutton	894	27.0	+3.0
Barnsley Ind.	Dave Cooper	595	17.9	−11.3
Conservative	George Hill	399	12.0	−2.8
Majority		533	16.1	+13.3
Turnout		3,315	40.5	+4.5
Labour hold		Swing	+3.5	

Dearne North
Party	Candidate	Votes	%	±%
Labour	Alan Gardiner	1,013	46.9	−8.4
BNP	Neil Bramley	466	21.6	+21.6
Liberal Democrats	Ian Garner	464	21.5	−3.3
Conservative	Gillian Millner	116	5.4	−1.7
Barnsley Ind.	Maureen Smith	102	4.7	−8.1
Majority		547	25.3	−5.2
Turnout		2,161	26.4	+3.1
Labour hold		Swing	-15.0	

Dearne South
Party	Candidate	Votes	%	±%
Labour	Ken Sanderson	1,347	45.9	+4.4
Liberal Democrats	Sarah Brook	785	26.7	−11.5
BNP	June Peel	662	22.6	+5.0
Conservative	Elizabeth Hill	141	4.8	+2.1
Majority		562	19.1	+15.8
Turnout		2,935	32.7	+0.7
Labour hold		Swing	+7.9	

Dodworth
Party	Candidate	Votes	%	±%
Barnsley Ind.	Brian Perrin	1,178	37.9	−10.2
Labour	Pauline Haigh	874	28.1	−7.5
Conservative	Stephen Webber	448	14.4	−1.9
BNP	Nick Parker	406	13.1	+13.1
Liberal Democrats	Aaron King	202	6.5	+6.5
Majority		304	9.8	−2.8
Turnout		3,108	39.8	+2.6
Barnsley Ind. hold		Swing	-1.3	

Hoyland Milton
Party	Candidate	Votes	%	±%
Barnsley Ind.	Barry Lipscombe	1,287	47.1	−0.3
Labour	Robin Franklin	1,187	43.4	+1.4
Conservative	Audrey Marsh	261	9.5	−1.1
Majority		100	3.7	−1.7
Turnout		2,735	31.0	+0.5
Barnsley Ind. hold		Swing	-0.8	

Kingstone
Party	Candidate	Votes	%	±%
Barnsley Ind.	Geoff Bowden	1,060	44.3	−9.2
Labour	Brian Swaine	841	35.2	+1.8
BNP	Paul Ratcliffe	361	15.1	+15.1
Conservative	Paul Buckley	129	5.4	−0.9
Majority		219	9.2	−10.9
Turnout		2,391	30.8	+2.4
Barnsley Ind. hold		Swing	-5.5	

Monk Bretton
Party	Candidate	Votes	%	±%
Labour	Margaret Sheard	1,004	43.3	+3.0
Barnsley Ind.	Clive Pickering	675	29.1	+4.3
BNP	Susan Harris	396	17.1	+2.7
Conservative	Michael Toon	244	10.5	+2.3
Majority		329	14.2	−1.3
Turnout		2,319	28.0	−0.2
Labour hold		Swing	-0.6	

North East
Party	Candidate	Votes	%	±%
Barnsley Ind.	Dave North	1,475	43.6	+43.6
Labour	Alex Vodden	1,299	38.4	−31.5
BNP	Robert Garrett	227	6.7	+6.7
Conservative	Marjorie Cale-Morgan	193	5.7	−24.4
Liberal Democrats	Danny Oates	190	5.6	+5.6
Majority		176	5.2	−34.5
Turnout		3,384	36.8	+9.6
Barnsley Ind. gain from Labour		Swing	+37.5	

Old Town
Party	Candidate	Votes	%	±%
Barnsley Ind.	Sandra Birkinshaw	1,503	55.7	−0.9
Labour	Martin Dyson	585	21.7	−2.5
BNP	Lance White	380	14.1	+2.7
Conservative	Anne Campbell	232	8.6	+0.8
Majority		918	34.0	+1.6
Turnout		2,700	32.9	+0.2
Barnsley Ind. hold		Swing	+0.8	

Penistone East
Party	Candidate	Votes	%	±%
Conservative	Paul Hand-Davis	1,885	49.0	−14.7
Labour	John Tidball	913	23.7	+4.0
Liberal Democrats	Trish Arundel	641	16.7	−0.5
BNP	Paul James	410	10.7	+10.7
Majority		972	25.3	+12.4
Turnout		3,849	41.4	+0.0
Conservative hold		Swing	-9.3	

Penistone West
Party	Candidate	Votes	%	±%
Conservative	Steve Marsh	1,451	41.0	+10.0
Independent	Richard Jenkins	912	25.8	+25.8
Labour	Peter Starling	562	15.9	−7.5
Green	Lynda Pickersgill	307	8.7	+0.1
BNP	Kelly Thorpe	303	8.6	−3.6
Majority		539	15.2	+8.9
Turnout		3,535	41.8	+2.8
Conservative hold		Swing	-7.9	

Rockingham
Party	Candidate	Votes	%	±%
Barnsley Ind.	Steve Sylvester	1,394	45.6	+14.5
Labour	Alan Schofield	1,301	42.6	−3.6
Conservative	Dorothy Shaw	360	11.8	+0.9
Majority		93	3.0	−12.0
Turnout		3,055	35.4	+3.4
Barnsley Ind. gain from Labour		Swing	+9.0	

Royston
Party	Candidate	Votes	%	±%
Labour	Bill Newman	1,115	44.7	+5.6
Liberal Democrats	Eddie Gouthwaite	531	21.3	+3.5
BNP	Paul Harris	332	13.3	−2.7
Barnsley Ind.	Daniel Pickering	299	12.0	−6.9
Conservative	Peter Murray	215	8.6	+0.6
Majority		584	23.4	+3.2
Turnout		2,492	30.3	+0.0
Labour hold		Swing	+1.0	

St Helens
Party	Candidate	Votes	%	±%
Labour	Jenny Platts	1,076	57.6	+7.6
Independent	Tony Brennan	348	18.6	−20.5
BNP	Lisa Brooksbank	311	16.6	+16.6
Conservative	Andrew Barr	133	7.1	−3.8
Majority		728	39.0	+28.1
Turnout		1,868	23.8	+0.1
Labour hold		Swing	+14.0	

Stairfoot
Party	Candidate	Votes	%	±%
Labour	Karen Dyson	1,029	41.5	+5.6
Barnsley Ind.	Mandy Jackson	698	28.1	−13.7
BNP	Kevin Noakes	368	14.8	−1.1
Independent	Peter Pleasants	260	10.5	+10.5
Conservative	Stuart Wilkinson	126	5.1	−1.3
Majority		331	13.3	+7.4
Turnout		2,481	30.7	−0.5
Labour hold		Swing	+9.6	

Wombwell
Party	Candidate	Votes	%	±%
Labour	Dick Wraith	1,432	59.2	+6.0
Barnsley Ind.	Ray Murdoch	355	14.7	−9.4
BNP	David Bailey	350	14.5	−1.1
Conservative	Keith Jenner	281	11.6	+4.5
Majority		1,077	44.5	+15.4
Turnout		2,418	29.2	−2.4
Labour hold		Swing	+7.7	

Worsbrough
Party	Candidate	Votes	%	±%
Labour	Betty Barlow	899	35.2	−4.4
Barnsley Ind.	Gill Carr	806	31.6	+8.4
BNP	Malcolm Jennings	444	17.4	+1.2
Liberal Democrats	Donald Wood	264	10.3	−4.9
Conservative	Mavis Peace	140	5.5	−0.2
Majority		93	3.6	−12.8
Turnout		2,553	34.1	+0.9
Labour hold		Swing	-6.4	
