= 2004 Barnsley Metropolitan Borough Council election =

2004 UK local government election

← 2003	10 June 2004	2006 →

All 63 seats to Barnsley Metropolitan Borough Council 32 seats needed for a majority
	First party	Second party	Third party
Party	Labour	Independent	Conservative
Seats won	33	22	5
Seat change	Steady	Steady	Steady
- Map of the 2004 Barnsley council election results. Labour in red, Independents in grey, Conservatives in blue and Lib Dems in yellow.
Majority party before election
Labour
Majority party after election
Labour

The 2004 Barnsley Metropolitan Borough Council election took place on 10 June 2004 to elect members of Barnsley Metropolitan Borough Council in South Yorkshire, England. The whole council was up for election with boundary changes since the last election in 2003 reducing the number of seats by 3. The Labour party stayed in overall control of the council.

== Election result ==
Barnsley Metropolitan Borough Council Election Result 2004
Party	Seats	Gains	Losses	Net gain/loss	Seats %	Votes %	Votes	+/−
Labour	33	0	0	0	52.4	36.4	26,756	-13.7
Independent	22	0	0	0	34.9	29.1	21,429	+6.9
Conservative	5	0	0	0	7.9	14.3	10,530	-0.9
Liberal Democrats	3	0	0	0	4.8	13.2	9,719	+2.4
BNP	0	0	0	0	0.0	6.9	5,092	+5.9

This resulted in the following composition of the council:

Party	Previous council	New council
Labour	47	33
Independent	10	22
Conservatives	5	5
Liberal Democrats	4	3
Total	66	63
Working majority	28	3

== Ward results ==
Central (3)
Party	Candidate	Votes	%	±%
Liberal Democrats	Ian Guest	1,154	41.3	N/A
Labour	Michael Stokes	984	35.2	N/A
Liberal Democrats	Don Hutton	951		
Labour	Thomas Sheard	939		
Liberal Democrats	Peter Politano	865		
Labour	Margaret Bruff	844		
BNP	Marie Gardner	401	14.3	N/A
Conservative	Geoffrey Turvey	256	9.2	N/A
Majority		170	6.1	N/A
Turnout		6,394	34.3	N/A
Liberal Democrats win (new seat)				
Labour win (new seat)				
Liberal Democrats win (new seat)				

Cudworth (3)
Party	Candidate	Votes	%	±%
Labour	Stephen Houghton CBE	1,675	51.3	N/A
Labour	Charlie Wraith	1,634		
Labour	Joseph Hayward	1,615		
Independent	Edgar Auckland	716	21.9	N/A
Independent	Alwyn Hodgson	700		
Independent	Ian Sanders	490		
Liberal Democrats	Pamela Kershaw	370	11.3	N/A
BNP	Paul Tibble	314	9.6	N/A
Conservative	Jean Rowley	187	5.7	N/A
Majority		959	29.4	N/A
Turnout		7,701	37.0	N/A
Labour win (new seat)				
Labour win (new seat)				
Labour win (new seat)				

Darfield (3)
Party	Candidate	Votes	%	±%
Independent	Ronald Fisher	1,730	47.1	N/A
Independent	David Wainwright	1,416		
Independent	Trevor Smith	1,317		
Labour	Gillian Bates	1,113	30.3	N/A
Labour	Brian Mathers	756		
Labour	Christopher Sykes	681		
Liberal Democrats	Sally Brook	303	8.3	N/A
BNP	David Highway	272	7.4	N/A
Conservative	Andrew Barr	252	6.9	N/A
Majority		617	16.8	N/A
Turnout		7,840	40.0	N/A
Independent win (new seat)				
Independent win (new seat)				
Independent win (new seat)				

Darton East (3)
Party	Candidate	Votes	%	±%
Labour	John Parkinson	1,341	35.9	N/A
Labour	Patrick Miller	1,284		
Labour	Thomas Cullum	1,190		
Independent	John Race	850	22.8	N/A
Conservative	Robert Barnard	768	20.6	N/A
Independent	Christopher Tummons	496		
Liberal Democrats	Patrick Logan	471	12.6	N/A
Conservative	Gordon Wilkinson	470		
Conservative	George Hill	457		
Independent	Edward Gouthwaite	335		
BNP	Jacqueline Hall	305	8.2	N/A
Majority		491	13.1	N/A
Turnout		7,967	47.4	N/A
Labour win (new seat)				
Labour win (new seat)				
Labour win (new seat)				

Darton West (3)
Party	Candidate	Votes	%	±%
Labour	Christopher Jenkinson	1,102	30.7	N/A
Labour	Linda Burgess	1,073		
Independent	Susan Simmons	989	27.5	N/A
Labour	Steve Redford	963		
Independent	Michael Walsh	816		
Independent	Mehdi Ghaffarian	695		
Conservative	Jack Orr	596	16.6	N/A
Liberal Democrats	Kenneth Smith	546	15.2	N/A
Conservative	Clive Watkinson	545		
Conservative	Tony Short	539		
BNP	Cheryl Saxton	358	10.0	N/A
Majority		113	3.1	N/A
Turnout		8,222	40.2	N/A
Labour win (new seat)				
Labour win (new seat)				
Independent win (new seat)				

Dearne North (3)
Party	Candidate	Votes	%	±%
Labour	Alan Hancock	1,319	48.7	N/A
Labour	Alan Gardiner	1,302		
Labour	Janice Hancock	1,271		
Liberal Democrats	Sarah Gardiner	1,065	39.4	N/A
Conservative	Stuart Wilkinson	322	11.9	N/A
Majority		254	9.4	N/A
Turnout		5,279	32.2	N/A
Labour win (new seat)				
Labour win (new seat)				
Labour win (new seat)				

Dearne South (3)
Party	Candidate	Votes	%	±%
Liberal Democrats	Sharron Brook	1,687	46.5	N/A
Labour	Kenneth Sanderson	1,670	46.0	N/A
Labour	John Thomson	1,489		
Labour	May Noble	1,427		
Conservative	Brent Wood	272	7.5	N/A
Majority		17	0.5	N/A
Turnout		6,545	36.2	N/A
Liberal Democrats win (new seat)				
Labour win (new seat)				
Labour win (new seat)				

Dodworth (3)
Party	Candidate	Votes	%	±%
Independent	Phillip Birkinshaw	2,013	59.8	N/A
Independent	Brian Perrin	1,920		
Independent	Charles Parker	1,761		
Labour	Phillip Lofts	904	26.8	N/A
Labour	John Ryan	848		
Labour	Yvonne Saunder	829		
Conservative	Andrew Milner	452	13.4	N/A
Majority		1,109	32.9	N/A
Turnout		8,727	43.4	N/A
Independent win (new seat)				
Independent win (new seat)				
Independent win (new seat)				

Hoyland Milton (3)
Party	Candidate	Votes	%	±%
Independent	Michael Brankin	1,852	55.5	N/A
Independent	John Lipscombe	1,599		
Independent	Trevor Naylor	1,520		
Labour	Robin Franklin	1,132	33.9	N/A
Labour	Patricia Wordsworth	956		
Labour	Timothy Shepherd	920		
Conservative	Marjorie Cale-Morgan	354	10.6	N/A
Majority		720	21.6	N/A
Turnout		8,333	39.0	N/A
Independent win (new seat)				
Independent win (new seat)				
Independent win (new seat)				

Kingstone (3)
Party	Candidate	Votes	%	±%
Independent	Malcolm Price	1,259	52.2	N/A
Independent	Malcolm Hall	1,240		
Independent	Donna Hollins	1,152		
Labour	Alice Cave	937	38.8	N/A
Labour	Peter Doyle	863		
Labour	Brian Swaine	797		
Conservative	Garry Needham	217	9.0	N/A
Majority		322	13.3	N/A
Turnout		6,465	33.1	N/A
Independent win (new seat)				
Independent win (new seat)				
Independent win (new seat)				

Monk Bretton (3)
Party	Candidate	Votes	%	±%
Independent	Grace Brown	1,299	41.7	N/A
Labour	Margaret Sheard	1,158	37.2	N/A
Labour	Kenneth Richardson	1,026		
Labour	Beryl Oldroyd	962		
Independent	Steven Jones	906		
Independent	Michael Moore	718		
Conservative	Roger Hinchliff	333	10.7	N/A
BNP	Susan Harris	326	10.5	N/A
Majority		141	4.5	N/A
Turnout		6,728	35.2	N/A
Independent win (new seat)				
Labour win (new seat)				
Labour win (new seat)				

North East (3)
Party	Candidate	Votes	%	±%
Labour	Arthur Whittaker	1,759	50.3	N/A
Labour	Alex Vodden	1,716		
Labour	Leah Dorothy Higginbotton	1,601		
Independent	Frank Hardy	1,020	29.1	N/A
Independent	Antony Devoy	709		
Independent	Edward Devoy	667		
BNP	David Saxton	411	11.7	N/A
Conservative	Peter Murray	310	8.9	N/A
Majority		739	21.1	N/A
Turnout		8,193	37.8	N/A
Labour win (new seat)				
Labour win (new seat)				
Labour win (new seat)				

Old Town (3)
Party	Candidate	Votes	%	±%
Independent	Bill Gaunt	1,551	43.1	N/A
Independent	Sandra Birkinshaw	1,531		
Independent	Peter Middleton	1,318		
Labour	Philip Davies	909	25.3	N/A
Labour	Margaret Cawthorne	862		
Labour	William Denton	759		
Liberal Democrats	Tony Conway	639	17.8	N/A
BNP	John Lee	273	7.6	N/A
Conservative	Richard Morrell	228	6.3	N/A
Majority		642	17.8	N/A
Turnout		8,070	40.2	N/A
Independent win (new seat)				
Independent win (new seat)				
Independent win (new seat)				

Penistone East (3)
Party	Candidate	Votes	%	±%
Conservative	Deborah Toon	2,028	40.9	N/A
Conservative	Alec Rowley	1,940		
Conservative	John Smith	1,664		
Labour	Jill Hayler	1,341	27.0	N/A
Liberal Democrats	Teresa Arundel	1,147	23.1	N/A
Labour	William Jones	1,125		
Labour	Robert Hannagan	982		
BNP	Geoffrey Broadley	447	9.0	N/A
Majority		687	13.8	N/A
Turnout		10,674	48.5	N/A
Conservative win (new seat)				
Conservative win (new seat)				
Conservative win (new seat)				

Penistone West (3)
Party	Candidate	Votes	%	±%
Conservative	Brenda Hinchliff	1,815	34.6	N/A
Independent	George Punt	1,779	33.9	N/A
Conservative	Benedict Marsden	1,391		
Labour	Joseph Unsworth	1,194	22.8	N/A
Conservative	John Wilson	797		
Labour	Peter Keys	597		
Labour	John Clarke	582		
BNP	Kelly Thorpe	456	8.7	N/A
Majority		36	0.7	N/A
Turnout		8,611	43.8	N/A
Conservative win (new seat)				
Independent win (new seat)				
Conservative win (new seat)				

Rockingham (3)
Party	Candidate	Votes	%	±%
Independent	Mary Brankin	1,494	41.3	N/A
Labour	Alan Schofield	1,397	38.6	N/A
Labour	James Andrews	1,342		
Independent	Alison Robinson	1,330		
Labour	Sharon Howard	1,291		
Independent	Geoffrey Howell	1,242		
BNP	Lorraine Lee	383	10.6	N/A
Conservative	Elizabeth Hill	345	9.5	N/A
Majority		97	2.7	N/A
Turnout		8,824	40.8	N/A
Independent win (new seat)				
Labour win (new seat)				
Labour win (new seat)				

Royston (3)
Party	Candidate	Votes	%	±%
Labour	Graham Kyte	1,510	43.7	N/A
Labour	Bill Newman	1,345		
Labour	Howard Lavender	1,266		
Independent	Leslie Brooke	952	27.6	N/A
Conservative	Kathleen Leeds	511	14.8	N/A
BNP	Paul Harris	480	13.9	N/A
Majority		558	16.2	N/A
Turnout		6,064	34.9	N/A
Labour win (new seat)				
Labour win (new seat)				
Labour win (new seat)				

St. Helen's (3)
Party	Candidate	Votes	%	±%
Labour	Leonard Picken	1,109	38.2	N/A
Independent	Roy Butterwood	1,055	36.3	N/A
Labour	David Bostwick	958		
Labour	Pat Newman	917		
Independent	Jack Brown	771		
Liberal Democrats	Rhiannon Rees	340	11.7	N/A
BNP	June Gough	245	8.4	N/A
Conservative	Anne Campbell	156	5.4	N/A
Majority		54	1.9	N/A
Turnout		5,551	30.5	N/A
Labour win (new seat)				
Independent win (new seat)				
Labour win (new seat)				

Stairfoot (3)
Party	Candidate	Votes	%	±%
Independent	Fred Clowery	1,163	41.0	N/A
Labour	Karen Dyson	1,162	41.0	N/A
Independent	Jim Smith	1,064		
Labour	Geoffrey Hill	974		
Labour	Mick Dunlavey	941		
Independent	Peter Pleasants	927		
Independent	Brian Cookson	583		
Liberal Democrats	Jacqueline Walker	345	12.2	N/A
Independent	Frank Watson	271		
Conservative	Michael Toon	165	5.8	N/A
Majority		1	0.0	N/A
Turnout		7,595	36.9	N/A
Independent win (new seat)				
Labour win (new seat)				
Independent win (new seat)				

Wombwell (3)
Party	Candidate	Votes	%	±%
Labour	Margaret Morgan	1,431	36.5	N/A
Labour	Richard Wraith	1,324		
Labour	Denise Wilde	1,233		
Independent	Arthur O'Loughlin	890	22.7	N/A
Liberal Democrats	Christopher Harding	786	20.0	N/A
BNP	Victoria Seeviour	421	10.7	N/A
Conservative	Angus Toon	393	10.0	N/A
Majority		541	13.8	N/A
Turnout		6,478	36.4	N/A
Labour win (new seat)				
Labour win (new seat)				
Labour win (new seat)				

Worsborough (3)
Party	Candidate	Votes	%	±%
Labour	Terry Bristowe	1,609	41.7	N/A
Labour	James Rae	1,526		
Labour	Eunice Taylor	1,284		
Liberal Democrats	Patricia Durie	866	22.4	N/A
Independent	Stephen Hart	817	21.2	N/A
Conservative	Elizabeth Elders	570	14.8	N/A
Majority		743	19.2	N/A
Turnout		6,672	38.19	N/A
Labour win (new seat)				
Labour win (new seat)				
Labour win (new seat)				
