= 1998 Barnsley Metropolitan Borough Council election =

1998 UK local government election

← 1996	7 May 1998	1999 →

One third of seats (22 of 66) to Barnsley Metropolitan Borough Council 34 seats needed for a majority
	First party	Second party	Third party
Party	Labour	Independent	Conservative
Seats won	21	1	0
Seat change	Steady	Steady	Steady
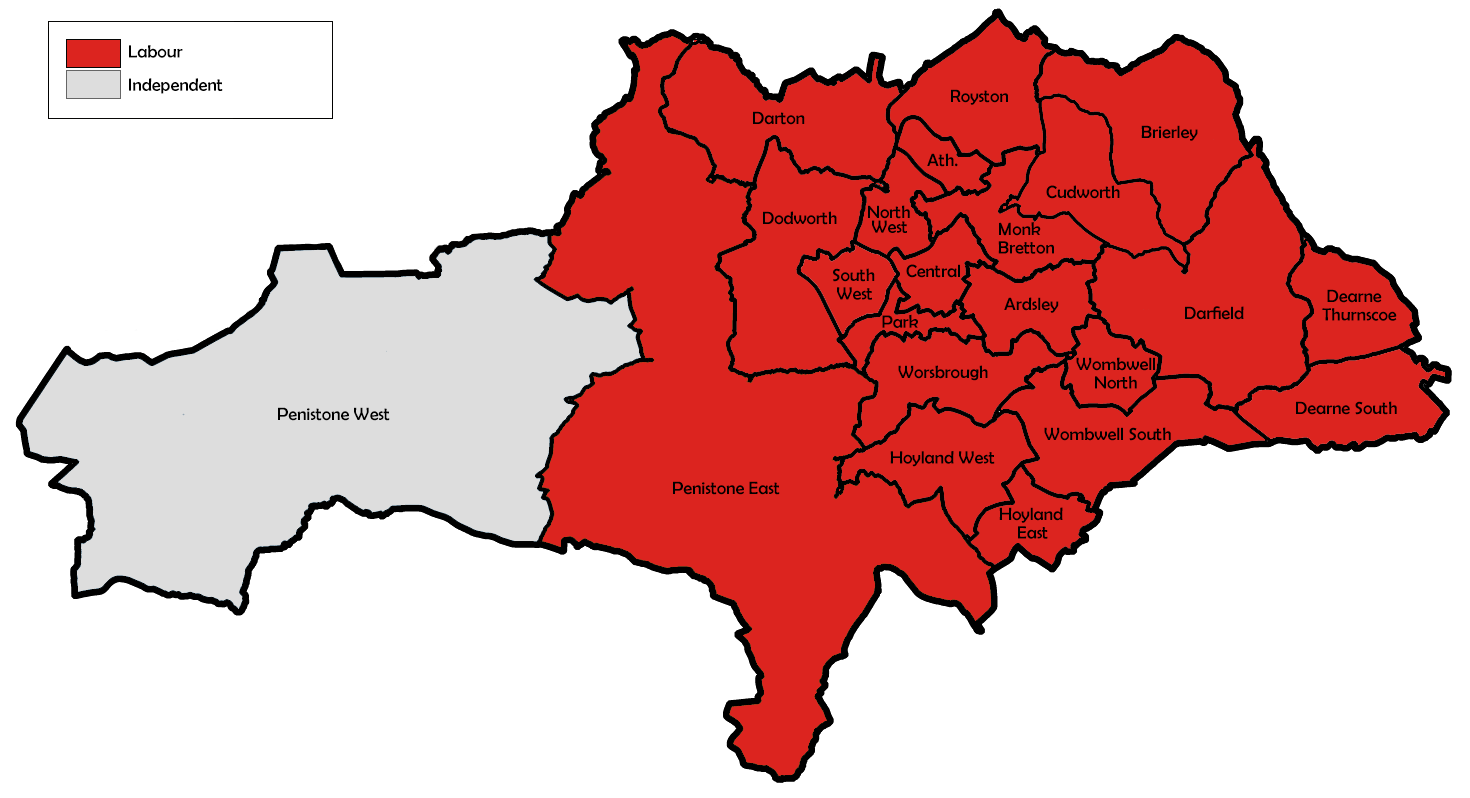
- Map showing the results of the 1998 Barnsley council elections.
Majority party before election
Labour
Majority party after election
Labour

Elections to Barnsley Metropolitan Borough Council were held on 7 May 1998. One third of the council was up for election and the Labour party kept overall control of the council.

== Election result ==
Barnsley Metropolitan Borough Council Election Result 1998
Party	Seats	Gains	Losses	Net gain/loss	Seats %	Votes %	Votes	+/−
Labour	21	0	0	0	95.5	70.8	24,350	+2.2
Independent	1	0	0	0	4.5	4.2	1,462	-5.4
Conservative	0	0	0	0	0	10.8	3,700	-1.4
Liberal Democrats	0	0	0	0	0	7.7	2,657	+7.7
Socialist Labour	0	0	0	0	0	4.7	1,613	+4.7
Green	0	0	0	0	0	1.3	441	-4.0
Socialist Alternative	0	0	0	0	0	0.6	190	-0.8

This resulted in the following composition of the council:

Party	Previous council	New council
Labour	63	63
Independent	2	2
Conservatives	1	1
Total	66	66
Working majority	60	60

== Ward results ==
+/- figures represent changes from the last time these wards were contested.

Ardsley
Party	Candidate	Votes	%	±%
Labour	K Dyson	777	69.3	N/A
Socialist Labour	S Logan	129	11.5	N/A
Liberal Democrats	J Earnshaw	119	10.6	N/A
Conservative	T Allerton	96	8.6	N/A
Majority		648	57.8	N/A
Turnout		1,121	15.7	N/A
Labour hold		Swing	N/A	

Athersley
Party	Candidate	Votes	%	±%
Labour	L Picken	978	85.3	N/A
Liberal Democrats	R Arundel	115	10.0	N/A
Socialist Labour	M Heppenstall	54	4.7	N/A
Majority		863	75.3	N/A
Turnout		1,147	19.1	N/A
Labour hold		Swing	N/A	

Brierley
Party	Candidate	Votes	%	±%
Labour	C Sykes	953	69.3	−15.3
Conservative	D Beaumont-Schofield	247	18.0	+2.5
Socialist Labour	J Yoxall	176	12.8	+12.8
Majority		706	51.3	−17.9
Turnout		1,376	19.7	−3.4
Labour hold		Swing	-8.9	

Central
Party	Candidate	Votes	%	±%
Labour	M Wilby	869	53.4	N/A
Liberal Democrats	I Guest	578	35.5	N/A
Socialist Labour	S Yoxall	108	6.6	N/A
Conservative	E Croft	71	4.4	N/A
Majority		291	17.9	N/A
Turnout		1,626	19.3	N/A
Labour hold		Swing	N/A	

Cudworth
Party	Candidate	Votes	%	±%
Labour	C Wraith	1,321	83.1	−5.2
Liberal Democrats	A Leonard	114	7.2	+7.2
Conservative	B Adams	105	6.6	+6.6
Socialist Labour	M Stannard	50	3.1	+3.1
Majority		1,207	75.9	−0.7
Turnout		1,590	21.4	−1.8
Labour hold		Swing	-6.2	

Darfield
Party	Candidate	Votes	%	±%
Labour	T Dixon	1,254	73.3	N/A
Liberal Democrats	T Arundel	202	11.8	N/A
Conservative	P Stubbins	202	11.8	N/A
Socialist Labour	E Mountain	53	3.1	N/A
Majority		1,052	61.5	N/A
Turnout		1,711	22.0	N/A
Labour hold		Swing	N/A	

Darton
Party	Candidate	Votes	%	±%
Labour	J Shepherd	1,383	72.4	N/A
Conservative	J Smith	401	21.0	N/A
Socialist Labour	S Robinson	125	6.5	N/A
Majority		982	51.4	N/A
Turnout		1,909	18.2	N/A
Labour hold		Swing	N/A	

Dearne South
Party	Candidate	Votes	%	±%
Labour	P Stuart	1,388	75.9	N/A
Liberal Democrats	S Brook	441	24.1	N/A
Majority		947	51.8	N/A
Turnout		1,829	21.4	N/A
Labour hold		Swing	N/A	

Dearne Thurnscoe
Party	Candidate	Votes	%	±%
Labour	C Evans	1,092	77.2	N/A
Liberal Democrats	L Mellor	243	17.2	N/A
Conservative	G Wilkinson	80	5.7	N/A
Majority		849	60.0	N/A
Turnout		1,415	18.2	N/A
Labour hold		Swing	N/A	

Dodworth
Party	Candidate	Votes	%	±%
Labour	S Staples	1,313	63.5	−10.8
Green	D Jones	441	21.3	−4.4
Conservative	B Martin	246	11.9	+11.9
Socialist Labour	L Heppenstall	69	3.3	+3.3
Majority		872	42.2	−6.5
Turnout		2,069	20.3	−3.9
Labour hold		Swing	-3.2	

Hoyland East
Party	Candidate	Votes	%	±%
Labour	M Brankin	1,450	88.8	N/A
Socialist Labour	M Smith	183	11.2	N/A
Majority		1,267	77.6	N/A
Turnout		1,633	20.9	N/A
Labour hold		Swing	N/A	

Hoyland West
Party	Candidate	Votes	%	±%
Labour	J Andrews	1,258	80.0	N/A
Conservative	H Jobling	211	13.4	N/A
Socialist Labour	Arthur Scargill	103	6.6	N/A
Majority		1,047	66.6	N/A
Turnout		1,572	24.0	N/A
Labour hold		Swing	N/A	

Monk Bretton
Party	Candidate	Votes	%	±%
Labour	R Robinson	1,111	77.0	N/A
Liberal Democrats	M Burgess	172	11.9	N/A
Conservative	G Fisher	97	6.7	N/A
Socialist Labour	J Morton	62	4.3	N/A
Majority		939	65.1	N/A
Turnout		1,442	17.3	N/A
Labour hold		Swing	N/A	

North West
Party	Candidate	Votes	%	±%
Labour	J Bostwick	883	66.9	−6.7
Conservative	C Carrington	220	16.7	−0.2
Liberal Democrats	J Ingram	175	13.3	+13.3
Socialist Labour	K Elbourne	42	3.2	+3.2
Majority		663	50.2	−6.6
Turnout		1,320	18.5	−0.4
Labour hold		Swing	-3.2	

Park
Party	Candidate	Votes	%	±%
Labour	A Wade	878	84.4	N/A
Conservative	N Norcross	105	10.1	N/A
Socialist Labour	N Wragg	57	5.5	N/A
Majority		773	74.3	N/A
Turnout		1,040	14.5	N/A
Labour hold		Swing	N/A	

Penistone East
Party	Candidate	Votes	%	±%
Labour	M Headon	1,214	60.9	+11.1
Conservative	G Hill	779	39.1	+39.1
Majority		435	21.8	+21.4
Turnout		1,993	26.1	−10.3
Labour hold		Swing	-14.0	

Penistone West
Party	Candidate	Votes	%	±%
Independent	G Punt	1,462	67.1	+67.1
Labour	C Shaw	716	32.9	−3.7
Majority		746	34.2	+28.4
Turnout		2,178	25.4	−8.8
Independent hold		Swing	+35.4	

Royston
Party	Candidate	Votes	%	±%
Labour	G Kyte	1,354	76.9	N/A
Liberal Democrats	A Hughes	206	11.7	N/A
Conservative	J Wilson	135	7.7	N/A
Socialist Labour	O Robinson	65	3.7	N/A
Majority		1,148	65.2	N/A
Turnout		1,760	20.4	N/A
Labour hold		Swing	N/A	

South West
Party	Candidate	Votes	%	±%
Labour	D Foster	995	70.3	−10.6
Conservative	J Carrington	327	23.1	+4.0
Socialist Labour	G Holt	93	6.6	+6.6
Majority		668	47.2	−14.6
Turnout		1,415	19.3	−4.1
Labour hold		Swing	-7.3	

Wombwell North
Party	Candidate	Votes	%	±%
Labour	A Hall	696	74.7	N/A
Liberal Democrats	C Stimson	109	11.7	N/A
Socialist Alternative	M Forster	66	7.1	N/A
Conservative	S Wilkinson	61	6.5	N/A
Majority		587	63.0	N/A
Turnout		932	18.4	N/A
Labour hold		Swing	N/A	

Wombwell South
Party	Candidate	Votes	%	±%
Labour	T Naylor	1,245	72.9	N/A
Liberal Democrats	M Brown	183	10.7	N/A
Conservative	N Grace	156	9.1	N/A
Socialist Alternative	A Waller	124	7.3	N/A
Majority		1,062	62.2	N/A
Turnout		1,708	21.5	N/A
Labour hold		Swing	N/A	

Worsborough
Party	Candidate	Votes	%	±%
Labour	T Bristowe	1,222	75.1	−13.3
Socialist Labour	T Robinson	244	15.0	+15.0
Conservative	E Elders	161	9.9	+9.9
Majority		978	60.1	−16.8
Turnout		1,627	21.3	−4.7
Labour hold		Swing	-14.1	

== By-elections between 1998 and 1999 ==
North West 18 February 1999 By-election
Party	Candidate	Votes	%	±%
Labour	M Cawthorne	446	60.1	−6.8
Liberal Democrats	J Ingram	125	16.8	+3.5
Conservative	C Carrington	124	16.7	+0.0
Independent Labour	D Wood	47	6.3	+6.3
Majority		321	43.3	6.9
Turnout		742	10.3	−8.2
Labour hold		Swing	-5.1	

South West 18 February 1999 By-election
Party	Candidate	Votes	%	±%
Labour	R Hannaghan	380	43.5	−26.8
Conservative	J Wilson	283	32.4	+9.3
Liberal Democrats	D Hutton	210	24.1	+24.1
Majority		97	11.1	−36.1
Turnout		873	12.0	−7.3
Labour hold		Swing	-18.0	

Wombwell North 18 February 1999 By-election
Party	Candidate	Votes	%	±%
Liberal Democrats	S Brook	678	54.4	+42.7
Labour	J Stowe	516	41.4	−33.3
Socialist Alternative	M Forster	28	2.2	−4.9
Conservative	N Grace	25	2.0	−4.5
Majority		162	13.0	−50.0
Turnout		1,247	24.0	+5.6
Liberal Democrats gain from Labour		Swing	+38.0	
