= 2010 Barnsley Metropolitan Borough Council election =

2010 UK local government election

Map of the results of the 2010 Barnsley council election.

The 2010 Barnsley Metropolitan Borough Council election took place on 6 May 2010 to elect members of Barnsley Metropolitan Borough Council in South Yorkshire, England. One third of the council was up for election and the Labour party stayed in overall control of the council.

After the election, the composition of the council was

- Labour 37
- Barnsley Independent Group 18
- Conservative 6
- Liberal Democrat 1
- Independent 1

== Background ==
The previous election in 2008 saw Labour's majority reduced to just one seat. The Barnsley Independent Group formed the main opposition with 22 seats compared to 32 for Labour, with Conservatives, a couple of other independents and 1 Liberal Democrat making up the council.

== Election result ==
The results saw Labour increase their majority from 1 to 11 seats after making 5 gains from the Barnsley Independent Group.

Barnsley local election result 2010
Party	Seats	Gains	Losses	Net gain/loss	Seats %	Votes %	Votes	+/−
Labour	17	5	0	+5	81.0	44.2	45,131	+13.8%
Barnsley Ind.	2	0	5	-5	9.5	19.5	19,891	-4.9%
Conservative	2	0	0	0	9.5	17.1	17,428	+2.0%
BNP	0	0	0	0	0	12.2	12,423	-4.9%
Liberal Democrats	0	0	0	0	0	6.1	6,175	-0.3%
Independent	0	0	0	0	0	0.8	855	-4.9%
Green	0	0	0	0	0	0.1	140	-0.6%

== Ward results ==
Central
Party	Candidate	Votes	%	±%
Labour	Margaret Bruff	2,024	47.6	+7.4
Liberal Democrats	Peter Politano	693	16.3	−7.0
BNP	Colin Porter	585	13.7	−1.6
Barnsley Ind.	Robert Warburton	486	11.4	N/A
Conservative	Howard Oldfield	468	11.0	+4.2
Majority		1,331	31.3	
Turnout		4,256	53.5	
Labour hold		Swing		

Cudworth
Party	Candidate	Votes	%	±%
Labour	Joe Hayward	2,441	53.8	−3.6
BNP	Terry Hubbard	619	13.7	N/A
Liberal Democrats	Pam Kershaw	577	12.7	N/A
Conservative	Paul Buckley	378	8.3	+2.2
Independent	Noel Shaw	249	5.5	N/A
Barnsley Ind.	Jim Johnson	196	4.3	−32.3
Independent	Tony Devoy	73	1.6	N/A
Majority		1,822	40.2	+16.2
Turnout		4,533	55.9	
Labour hold		Swing		

Darfield
Party	Candidate	Votes	%	±%
Labour	Pauline Markham	1,945	43.0	+14.6
Barnsley Ind.	Trevor Smith	1,383	30.6	−13.8
Conservative	Pamela Jenner	688	15.2	+8.5
BNP	Steven O'Connor	507	11.2	−2.1
Majority		562	12.4	
Turnout		4,523	56.6	
Labour gain from Barnsley Ind.		Swing		

Darton East
Party	Candidate	Votes	%	±%
Barnsley Ind.	Harry Spence	2,263	43.7	−2.1
Labour	Pauline Haigh	1,683	32.5	−+2.9
Conservative	Peter Murray	741	14.3	−0.2
BNP	Sharon Sutton	487	9.4	N/A
Majority		580	11.2	
Turnout		5,174	60.9	
Barnsley Ind. hold		Swing		

Darton West
Party	Candidate	Votes	%	±%
Labour	Sharon Howard	2,351	43.8	−11.5
Barnsley Ind.	Tony Conway	1,115	20.8	+8.0
Conservative	Gordon Wilkinson	1,061	19.8	+12.7
BNP	Ian Sutton	838	15.6	N/A
Majority		1,236	23.0	+15.0
Turnout		5,365	64.9	
Labour hold		Swing		

Dearne North
Party	Candidate	Votes	%	±%
Labour	Janice Hancock	2,278	58.9	+3.6
Barnsley Ind.	Kurt Garner	647	16.7	+3.9
BNP	Raymond Hinchcliffe	595	15.4	N/A
Conservative	Michael Toon	348	9.0	+1.9
Majority		1,631	42.2	+20.5
Turnout		3,868	48.2	
Labour hold		Swing		

Dearne South
Party	Candidate	Votes	%	±%
Labour	May Noble	2,448	49.8	+8.3
Liberal Democrats	Sarah Brook	1,381	28.1	−10.1
BNP	John Bettney	690	14.0	−3.6
Conservative	Stuart Wilkinson	328	6.7	+1.4
Barnsley Ind.	Susan Garner	70	1.4	+4.0
Majority		1,067	21.7	
Turnout		4,917	54.1	
Labour hold		Swing		

Dodworth
Party	Candidate	Votes	%	±%
Barnsley Ind.	Jack Carr	1,782	34.2	−13.9
Labour	Dave Leech	1,705	32.8	−2.8
Conservative	Andrew Barr	1,199	23.0	+6.7
BNP	Alan Brown	517	9.9	N/A
Majority		77	1.5	−25.2
Turnout		5,203	66.3	
Barnsley Ind. hold		Swing		

Hoyland Milton
Party	Candidate	Votes	%	±%
Labour	Robin Franklin	2,269	43.3	+1.3
Barnsley Ind.	John Carr	1,114	21.3	−26.1
Conservative	Geoffrey Thomas	709	13.5	+2.9
BNP	Claire Holland	539	10.3	N/A
Liberal Democrats	Mandy Saadallah	470	9.0	N/A
Green	Paul White	140	2.7	N/A
Majority		1,155	22.0	
Turnout		5,241	46.7	
Labour gain from Barnsley Ind.		Swing		

Kingstone
Party	Candidate	Votes	%	±%
Labour	Kath Mitchell	1,768	43.0	+9.6
Barnsley Ind.	Noel Cowdell	1,378	33.5	−20.0
BNP	Kevin Fisher	532	12.9	N/A
Conservative	Howard Pearson	436	10.6	+4.3
Majority		390	9.5	
Turnout		4,114	51.8	
Labour gain from Barnsley Ind.		Swing		

Monk Bretton
Party	Candidate	Votes	%	±%
Labour	Kenneth Richardson	2,060	45.8	+5.5
Barnsley Ind.	Clive Pickering	1,151	25.6	+0.8
BNP	Jane Hubbard	853	19.0	+4.6
Conservative	George Hill	436	9.7	+1.5
Majority		909	20.2	
Turnout		4,500	54.6	
Labour hold		Swing		

North East
Party	Candidate	Votes	%	±%
Labour	Dorothy Higginbottom	2,570	45.9	−24.0
Barnsley Ind.	Stella Milner	1,539	27.5	N/A
Conservative	Stephen Fowler	614	11.0	−19.1
BNP	Winn Dashwood	580	10.4	N/A
Independent	Eddie Devoy	294	5.3	N/A
Majority		1,031	18.4	
Turnout		5,597	56.9	
Labour hold		Swing		

Old Town
Party	Candidate	Votes	%	±%
Labour	Penny Lofts	2,067	40.5	+16.3
Barnsley Ind.	Peter Middleton	1,767	34.6	−22.0
Conservative	Clive Watkinson	704	13.8	+4.0
BNP	Dean Walker	562	11.0	−0.4
Majority		300	5.9	
Turnout		5,100	60.1	
Labour gain from Barnsley Ind.		Swing		

Penistone East
Party	Candidate	Votes	%	±%
Conservative	Robert Barnard	2,976	44.1	–
Labour	Jill Hayler	1,845	27.3	–
Liberal Democrats	Trish Arundel	1,410	20.9	–
BNP	Daz Burrows	350	5.2	–
Barnsley Ind.	Samantha Beardshall	167	2.5	–
Majority		1,131	16.8	−14.7
Turnout		6,748	72.5	
Conservative hold		Swing		

Penistone West
Party	Candidate	Votes	%	±%
Conservative	Andrew Milner	2,871	48.7	+17.7
Labour	Peter Starling	2,047	34.8	+11.4
BNP	Paul James	512	8.7	−3.5
Barnsley Ind.	Richard Beardshall	460	7.8	−17.0
Majority		824	14.0	−9.2
Turnout		5,890	66.2	
Conservative hold		Swing		

Rockingham
Party	Candidate	Votes	%	±%
Labour	James Andrews	2,430	45.8	−0.4
Barnsley Ind.	Martyn Burdin	1,381	26.0	−5.1
Conservative	Elizabeth Hill	710	13.4	+2.5
BNP	Robert Ellis	544	10.3	N/A
Independent	Nigel Bailey	239	4.5	N/A
Majority		1,049	19.8	
Turnout		5,304	60.8	
Labour hold		Swing		

Royston
Party	Candidate	Votes	%	±%
Labour	Tim Cheetham	2,175	46.1	+7.0
Liberal Democrats	Danny Oates	1,078	22.8	+5.0
Conservative	Lesley Watkinson	628	13.3	+5.3
BNP	Paul Harris	564	12.0	−4.0
Barnsley Ind.	Daniel Pickering	274	5.8	−13.1
Majority		1,097	23.2	−3.7
Turnout		4,719	56.4	
Labour hold		Swing		

St. Helen's
Party	Candidate	Votes	%	±%
Labour	Roy Butterwood	2,593	70.5	+20.5
BNP	Lisa Brooksbank	634	17.2	N/A
Conservative	Gillian Millner	453	12.3	+1.4
Majority		1,959	53.2	+37.5
Turnout		3,680	47.9	
Labour hold		Swing		

Stairfoot
Party	Candidate	Votes	%	±%
Labour	Brian Mathers	2,011	45.5	+9.6
Barnsley Ind.	Jim Smith	1,361	30.8	−11.0
BNP	Susan Harris	559	12.6	−3.3
Conservative	Robert Kena	491	11.1	+4.7
Majority		650	14.7	
Turnout		4,422	52.6	
Labour gain from Barnsley Ind.		Swing		

Wombwell
Party	Candidate	Votes	%	±%
Labour	Denise Wilde	2,617	57.7	+4.5
Conservative	Keith Jenner	764	16.8	+9.7
BNP	Jackie Bettney	738	16.3	+0.7
Barnsley Ind.	Raymond Murdoch	419	9.2	−14.9
Majority		1,853	40.8	+13.4
Turnout		4,538	52.5	
Labour hold		Swing		

Worsbrough
Party	Candidate	Votes	%	±%
Labour	John Clarke	1,804	41.5	+1.9
Barnsley Ind.	John Sanderson	938	21.6	−1.6
BNP	Daniel Cooke	618	14.2	−2.0
Liberal Democrats	Pat Durie	566	13.0	−2.2
Conservative	Garry Needham	425	9.8	+4.1
Majority		866	19.9	
Turnout		4,351	57.0	
Labour hold		Swing		
