= 1999 Barnsley Metropolitan Borough Council election =

1999 UK local government election

- 6 May 1999

One third of seats (22 of 66) to Barnsley Metropolitan Borough Council 34 seats needed for a majority
	First party	Second party	Third party
Party	Labour	Liberal Democrats	Conservative
Seats won	19	1	1
Seat change	▼3	▲1	▲1
	Fourth party
Party	Independent
Seats won	1
Seat change	▲1
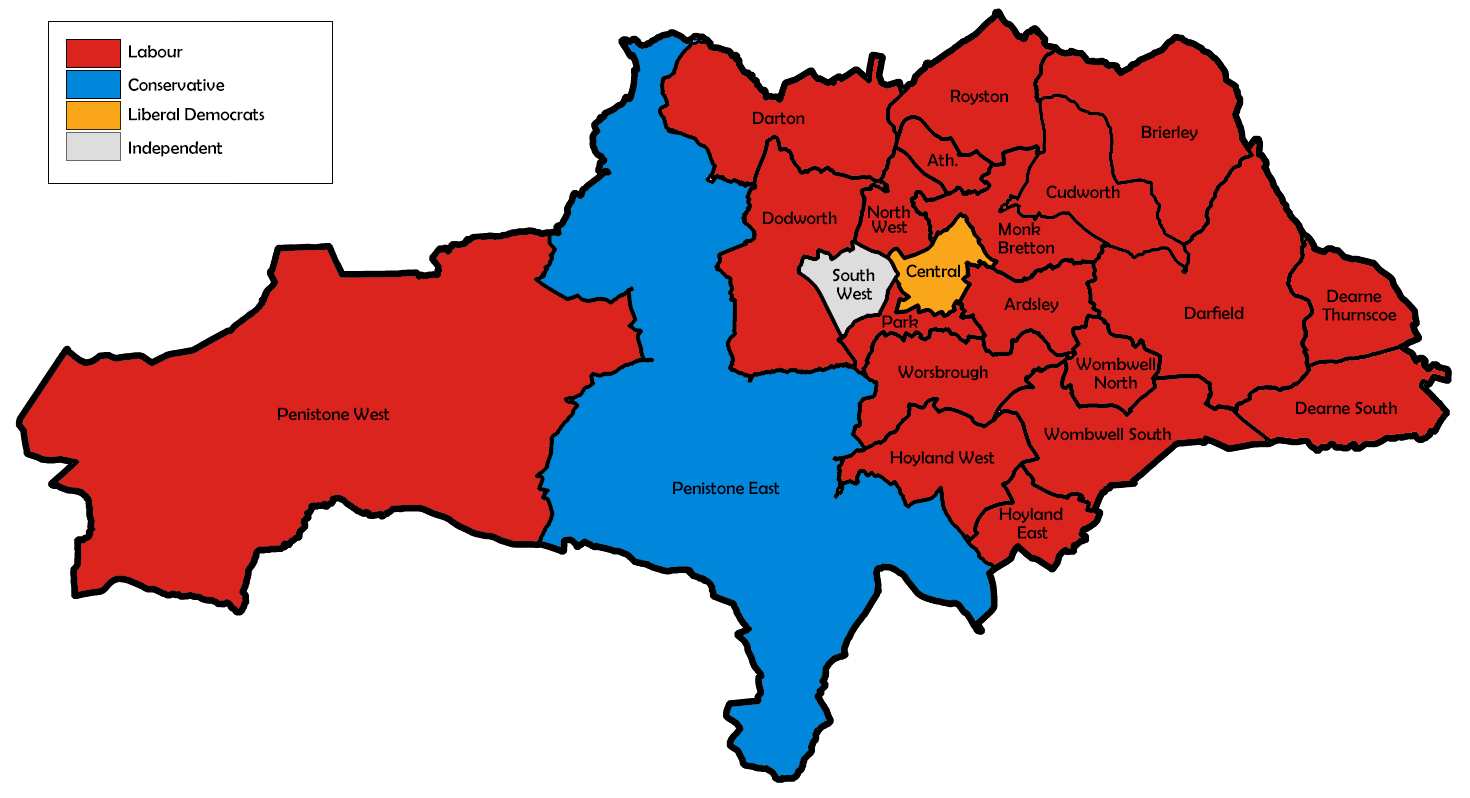
- Map showing the results of the 1999 Barnsley council elections.
Majority party before election
Labour
Majority party after election
Labour

The 1999 Barnsley Metropolitan Borough Council election took place on 6 May 1999 to elect members of Barnsley Metropolitan Borough Council in South Yorkshire, England. Prior to the election, the Liberal Democrats had gained a seat in Wombwell North from Labour. One third of the council was up for election and the Labour Party stayed in overall control of the council.

== Election results ==
Barnsley Metropolitan Borough Council Election Result 1999
Party	Seats	Gains	Losses	Net gain/loss	Seats %	Votes %	Votes	+/−
Labour	19	0	3	-3	86.4	54.4	21,806	-16.4
Liberal Democrats	1	1	0	+1	4.5	22.7	9,089	+15.0
Conservative	1	1	0	+1	4.5	10.7	4,279	-0.1
Independent	1	1	0	+1	4.5	5.2	2,066	+1.0
Independent Labour	0	0	0	0	0.0	3.2	1,274	+3.2
Socialist Labour	0	0	0	0	0.0	2.7	1,094	-2.0
Green	0	0	0	0	0.0	0.8	307	-0.5
Socialist	0	0	0	0	0.0	0.4	151	-0.2

This resulted in the following composition of the council:

Party	Previous council	New council
Labour	62	59
Independent	2	3
Conservatives	1	2
Liberal Democrats	1	2
Total	66	66
Working majority	58	52

== Ward results ==
+/- figures represent changes from the last time these wards were contested.

Ardsley
Party	Candidate	Votes	%	±%
Labour	S Redford	819	59.9	−9.4
Liberal Democrats	H Harding	320	23.4	+12.8
Socialist Labour	S Logan	142	10.4	−1.1
Conservative	M Cale-Morgan	86	6.3	−2.3
Majority		499	36.5	−21.3
Turnout		1,367	19.3	+3.6
Labour hold		Swing	-11.1	

Athersley
Party	Candidate	Votes	%	±%
Labour	M Woodhead	858	75.7	−9.6
Liberal Democrats	M Wright	199	17.6	+7.6
Conservative	T Allerton	43	3.8	+3.8
Socialist Labour	P Robinson	33	2.9	−1.8
Majority		659	58.2	−17.1
Turnout		1,133	18.7	−0.4
Labour hold		Swing	-8.6	

Brierley
Party	Candidate	Votes	%	±%
Labour	A Vodden	1,132	67.8	−1.5
Socialist Labour	J Simmons	242	14.5	+1.7
Conservative	D Beaumont-Schofield	197	11.8	−6.2
Liberal Democrats	S Brook	98	5.9	+5.9
Majority		890	53.3	+2.0
Turnout		1,669	24.5	+4.8
Labour hold		Swing	-1.6	

Central
Party	Candidate	Votes	%	±%
Liberal Democrats	I Guest	1,074	50.4	+14.9
Labour	R Fisher	927	43.5	−9.9
Socialist Labour	S Yoxall	68	3.2	−3.4
Conservative	J Carrington	61	2.9	−1.5
Majority		147	6.9	−11.0
Turnout		2,130	25.7	+6.4
Liberal Democrats gain from Labour		Swing	+12.4	

Cudworth
Party	Candidate	Votes	%	±%
Labour	J Hayward	1,269	72.4	−10.7
Liberal Democrats	R Arundell	296	16.9	+9.7
Conservative	A Campbell	134	7.6	+1.0
Socialist Labour	M Stannard	54	3.1	+0.0
Majority		973	55.5	−20.4
Turnout		1,753	23.2	+1.8
Labour hold		Swing	-10.2	

Darfield
Party	Candidate	Votes	%	±%
Labour	G Bates	1,261	66.6	−6.7
Liberal Democrats	M Brown	474	25.0	+13.2
Conservative	P Stubbins	158	8.3	−3.5
Majority		787	41.6	−19.9
Turnout		1,893	24.3	+2.3
Labour hold		Swing	-9.9	

Darton
Party	Candidate	Votes	%	±%
Labour	T Cullum	1,330	60.9	−11.5
Liberal Democrats	J Hollingsworth	604	27.7	+27.7
Conservative	J Smith	207	9.5	−11.5
Socialist Labour	S Robinson	43	2.0	−4.5
Majority		726	33.2	−18.2
Turnout		2,184	20.5	+2.3
Labour hold		Swing	-19.6	

Dearne South
Party	Candidate	Votes	%	±%
Labour	A Cross	1,248	70.3	−5.6
Liberal Democrats	Sharron Brook	454	25.6	+1.5
Conservative	E Croft	74	4.2	+4.2
Majority		794	44.7	−7.1
Turnout		1,776	20.0	−1.4
Labour hold		Swing	-3.5	

Dearne Thurnscoe
Party	Candidate	Votes	%	±%
Labour	A Gardiner	1,115	76.9	−0.3
Liberal Democrats	H Newton	272	18.8	+1.6
Conservative	G Wilkinson	63	4.3	−1.4
Majority		843	58.1	−1.9
Turnout		1,450	19.0	+0.8
Labour hold		Swing	-0.9	

Dodworth
Party	Candidate	Votes	%	±%
Labour	P Lofts	1,033	40.3	−23.2
Independent Labour	M Walsh	525	20.5	+20.5
Liberal Democrats	J Earnshaw	399	15.6	+15.6
Green	D Jones	307	12.0	−9.3
Conservative	G Hill	248	9.7	−2.2
Socialist Labour	L Heppenstall	49	1.9	−1.4
Majority		508	19.8	−22.4
Turnout		2,561	25.2	+4.9
Labour hold		Swing	-21.8	

Hoyland East
Party	Candidate	Votes	%	±%
Labour	P Wordsworth	1,102	57.4	−31.4
Independent Labour	B Maguire	390	20.3	+20.3
Liberal Democrats	C Stimson	234	12.2	+12.2
Conservative	M West	147	7.7	+7.7
Socialist Labour	M Smith	46	2.4	−8.8
Majority		712	37.1	−40.5
Turnout		1,919	23.9	+3.0
Labour hold		Swing	-25.8	

Hoyland West
Party	Candidate	Votes	%	±%
Labour	A Schofield	937	51.5	−28.5
Independent	Les Levitt	453	24.9	+24.9
Liberal Democrats	B Martin	277	15.2	+15.2
Conservative	H Jobling	115	6.3	−7.1
Socialist Labour	G Pickering	36	2.0	−4.6
Majority		484	26.6	−40.0
Turnout		1,818	28.0	+4.0
Labour hold		Swing	-26.7	

Monk Bretton
Party	Candidate	Votes	%	±%
Labour	M Sheard	806	41.4	−35.6
Independent	G Brown	800	41.1	+41.1
Liberal Democrats	D McVey	239	12.3	+0.4
Conservative	S Wilkinson	102	5.2	−1.5
Majority		6	0.3	−64.8
Turnout		1,947	23.4	+6.1
Labour hold		Swing	-38.3	

North West
Party	Candidate	Votes	%	±%
Labour	M Cawthorne	678	53.3	−13.6
Liberal Democrats	J Ingram	326	25.6	+12.3
Conservative	C Carrington	240	18.9	+2.2
Socialist Labour	K Elbourne	27	2.1	−1.1
Majority		352	27.7	−22.5
Turnout		1,271	17.8	−0.7
Labour hold		Swing	-12.9	

Park
Party	Candidate	Votes	%	±%
Labour	P Leigh	710	65.3	−19.1
Liberal Democrats	P Durie	226	20.8	+20.8
Conservative	W Barkworth	92	8.5	−1.6
Socialist Labour	N Wragg	59	5.4	−0.1
Majority		484	44.5	−29.8
Turnout		1,087	19.5	+5.0
Labour hold		Swing	-19.9	

Penistone East
Party	Candidate	Votes	%	±%
Conservative	D Toon	1,029	39.7	+0.6
Labour	T Shepherd	1,027	39.6	−21.3
Liberal Democrats	T Arundell	536	20.7	+20.7
Majority		2	0.1	−21.7
Turnout		2,592	33.6	+7.5
Conservative gain from Labour		Swing	+10.9	

Penistone West
Party	Candidate	Votes	%	±%
Labour	J Unsworth	900	42.7	+9.8
Liberal Democrats	M Wilkinson	732	34.7	+34.7
Conservative	D Plotts	478	22.7	+22.7
Majority		168	8.0	−26.2
Turnout		2,110	24.3	−1.1
Labour hold		Swing	-12.4	

Royston
Party	Candidate	Votes	%	±%
Labour	H Lavender	1,103	58.9	−18.0
Liberal Democrats	E Gouthwaite	604	32.3	+20.6
Conservative	K Leeds	113	6.0	−1.7
Socialist Labour	O Robinson	52	2.8	−0.9
Majority		499	26.7	−38.5
Turnout		1,872	21.5	+1.1
Labour hold		Swing	-19.3	

South West
Party	Candidate	Votes	%	±%
Independent	M Hall	813	40.8	+40.8
Labour	C Henshaw	483	24.3	−46.0
Conservative	J Wilson	398	20.0	−3.1
Liberal Democrats	D Hutton	275	13.8	+13.8
Socialist Labour	G Holt	22	1.1	−5.5
Majority		330	16.6	−30.6
Turnout		1,991	27.0	+7.7
Independent gain from Labour		Swing	+43.4	

Wombwell North
Party	Candidate	Votes	%	±%
Labour	R Wraith	781	49.1	−25.6
Liberal Democrats	C Harding	754	47.4	+35.7
Socialist	M Forster	29	1.8	−5.3
Conservative	N Grace	28	1.8	−4.7
Majority		27	1.7	−61.3
Turnout		1,592	31.3	+12.9
Labour hold		Swing	-30.6	

Wombwell South
Party	Candidate	Votes	%	±%
Labour	J Wake	1,244	64.5	−8.4
Liberal Democrats	W Millard	421	21.8	+11.1
Conservative	H Oldfield	143	7.4	−1.7
Socialist	A Waller	122	6.3	−1.0
Majority		823	42.6	−19.6
Turnout		1,930	24.0	+2.5
Labour hold		Swing	-9.7	

Worsborough
Party	Candidate	Votes	%	±%
Labour	F Wright	1,043	51.6	−23.5
Independent Labour	D Wood	359	17.8	+17.8
Liberal Democrats	M Newton	275	13.6	+13.6
Socialist Labour	T Robinson	221	10.9	−4.1
Conservative	E Elders	123	6.1	−3.8
Majority		684	33.8	−26.3
Turnout		2,021	26.7	+5.4
Labour hold		Swing	-20.6	

== By-elections between 1999 and 2000 ==
Hoyland East 29 July 1999 By-election
Party	Candidate	Votes	%	±%
Labour	T Shepherd	626	72.0	+2.4
Liberal Democrats	B Martin	150	17.2	+5.0
Conservative	R Morrell	93	10.7	+3.0
Majority		476	54.8	+17.7
Turnout		869	10.8	−13.1
Labour hold		Swing	+4.8	

South West 29 July 1999 By-election
Party	Candidate	Votes	%	±%
Independent	S Birkinshaw	686	43.2	+2.4
Labour	S Henshaw	407	25.6	+1.3
Liberal Democrats	D Hutton	286	18.0	+4.2
Conservative	J Wilson	210	13.2	−6.8
Majority		279	17.6	+1.0
Turnout		1,589	21.3	−5.7
Independent gain from Labour		Swing	+0.5	
