= Barnsley Metropolitan Borough Council elections =

Barnsley Metropolitan Borough elections

Barnsley Metropolitan Borough Council is the local authority for the Metropolitan Borough of Barnsley in South Yorkshire, England. One third of the council is elected each year, except for every fourth year when there is no election. Since the last boundary changes in 2004, councillors are elected from 21 wards.

== Council elections ==
Summary of the council composition after council elections, click on the year for full details of each election. Boundary changes took place for the 1979 election (increasing the number of seats by 6) and more recently the 2004 election (which decreased the number of seats by 3) prompting the whole council to be elected in those years.

| Year | Labour | Conservative | Liberal / Lib Dem | Independent | Ratepayers / Residents | Independent Labour | Barnsley Independent | Democrats and Veterans | Reform UK | Council control after election |
| 1973 | 57 | 0 | 0 | 1 | 0 | 2 (1 Dem Lab) | 0 | 0 | 0 | Labour |
| 1975 | 48 | 1 | 2 | 1 | 6 | 2 (1 Dem Lab) | 0 | 0 | 0 | Labour |
| 1976 | 39 | 1 | 5 | 1 | 11 | 3 (1 Dem Lab) | 0 | 0 | 0 | Labour |
| 1978 | 37 | 1 | 5 | 1 | 14 | 2 | 0 | 0 | 0 | Labour |
| 1979 | 41 | 3 | 1 | 0 | 18 | 3 | 0 | 0 | 0 | Labour |
| 1980 | 46 | 3 | 1 | 0 | 13 | 3 | 0 | 0 | 0 | Labour |
| 1982 | 53 | 2 | 4 | 0 | 7 | 0 | 0 | 0 | 0 | Labour |
| 1983 | 58 | 3 | 2 | 0 | 3 | 0 | 0 | 0 | 0 | Labour |
| 1984 | 59 | 3 | 2 | 1 | 1 | 0 | 0 | 0 | 0 | Labour |
| 1986 | 62 | 2 | 0 | 1 | 1 | 0 | 0 | 0 | 0 | Labour |
| 1987 | 62 | 2 | 0 | 1 | 1 | 0 | 0 | 0 | 0 | Labour |
| 1988 | 62 | 2 | 0 | 1 | 1 | 0 | 0 | 0 | 0 | Labour |
| 1990 | 62 | 2 | 0 | 1 | 1 | 0 | 0 | 0 | 0 | Labour |
| 1991 | 62 | 2 | 0 | 2 | 0 | 0 | 0 | 0 | 0 | Labour |
| 1992 | 63 | 2 | 0 | 1 | 0 | 0 | 0 | 0 | 0 | Labour |
| 1994 | 62 | 2 | 0 | 2 | 0 | 0 | 0 | 0 | 0 | Labour |
| 1995 | 64 | 1 | 0 | 1 | 0 | 0 | 0 | 0 | 0 | Labour |
| 1996 | 63 | 1 | 0 | 2 | 0 | 0 | 0 | 0 | 0 | Labour |
| 1998 | 63 | 1 | 0 | 2 | 0 | 0 | 0 | 0 | 0 | Labour |
| 1999 | 59 | 2 | 2 | 3 | 0 | 0 | 0 | 0 | 0 | Labour |
| 2000 | 52 | 3 | 3 | 8 | 0 | 0 | 0 | 0 | 0 | Labour |
| 2002 | 49 | 4 | 3 | 10 | 0 | 0 | 0 | 0 | 0 | Labour |
| 2003 | 47 | 5 | 4 | 10 | 0 | 0 | 0 | 0 | 0 | Labour |
| 2004 | 33 | 5 | 3 | 22 | 0 | 0 | 0 | 0 | 0 | Labour |
| 2006 | 34 | 5 | 2 | 0 | 0 | 0 | 22 | 0 | 0 | Labour |
| 2007 | 33 | 5 | 2 | 2 | 0 | 0 | 21 | 0 | 0 | Labour |
| 2008 | 32 | 6 | 1 | 2 | 0 | 0 | 22 | 0 | 0 | Labour |
| 2010 | 37 | 6 | 1 | 1 | 0 | 0 | 18 | 0 | 0 | Labour |
| 2011 | 43 | 6 | 0 | 1 | 0 | 0 | 13 | 0 | 0 | Labour |
| 2012 | 52 | 5 | 0 | 0 | 0 | 0 | 6 | 0 | 0 | Labour |
| 2014 | 53 | 4 | 0 | 0 | 0 | 0 | 6 | 0 | 0 | Labour |
| 2015 | 55 | 4 | 0 | 0 | 0 | 0 | 4 | 0 | 0 | Labour |
| 2016 | 55 | 3 | 1 | 0 | 0 | 0 | 4 | 0 | 0 | Labour |
| 2018 | 56 | 4 | 1 | 0 | 0 | 0 | 2 | 0 | 0 | Labour |
| 2019 | 49 | 3 | 4 | 2 | 0 | 0 | 3 | 2 | 0 | Labour |
| 2021 | 49 | 3 | 7 | 3 | 0 | 0 | 1 | 0 | 0 | Labour |
| 2022 | 46 | 4 | 9 | 3 | 0 | 0 | 1 | 0 | 0 | Labour |
| 2023 | 48 | 2 | 10 | 2 | 0 | 0 | 0 | 0 | 1 | Labour |
| 2024 | 48 | 1 | 11 | 2 | 0 | 0 | 0 | 0 | 1 | Labour |
| 2026 | 11 | 0 | 8 | 2 | 0 | 0 | 0 | 0 | 42 | Reform |

== Borough result maps ==
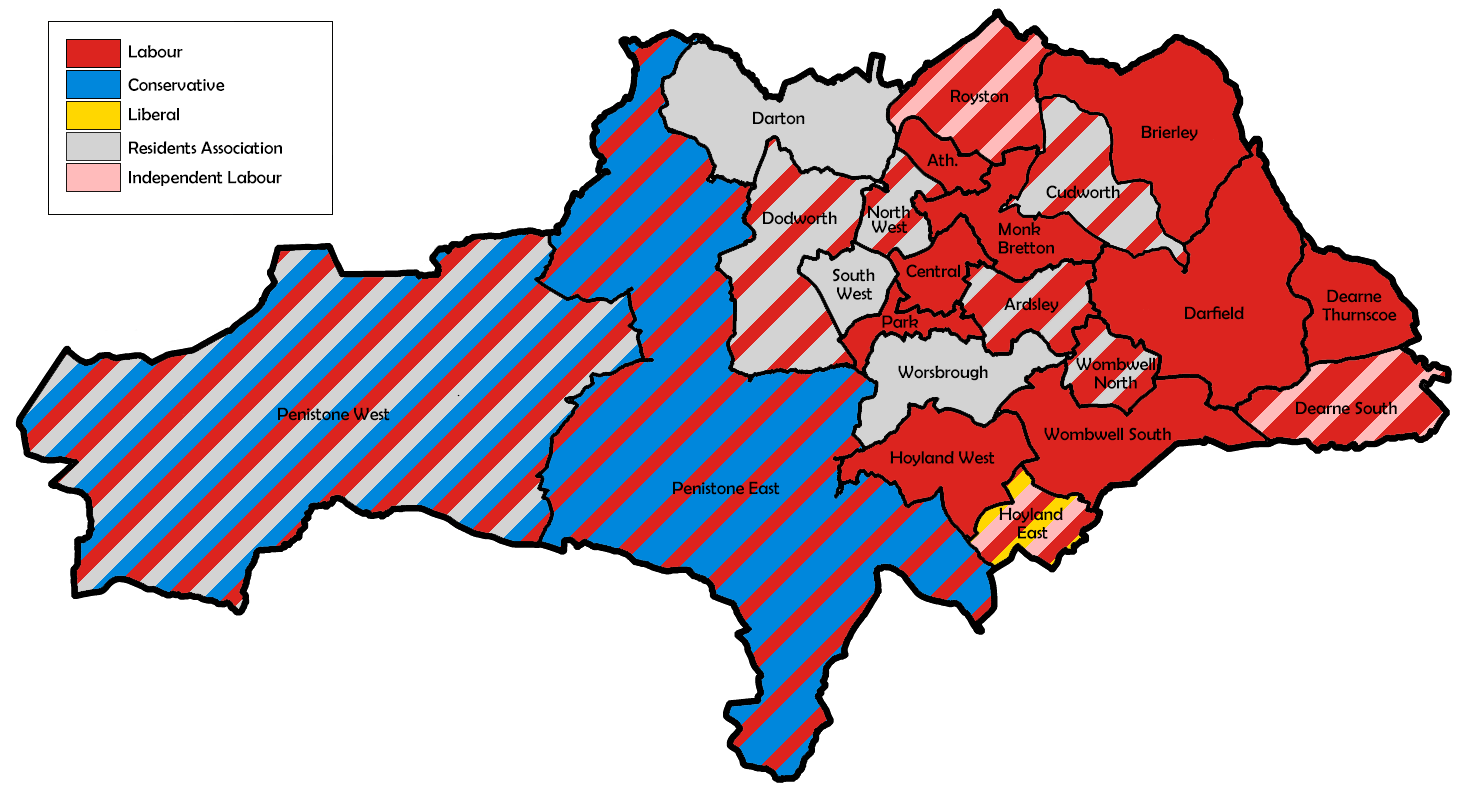
1979 results map

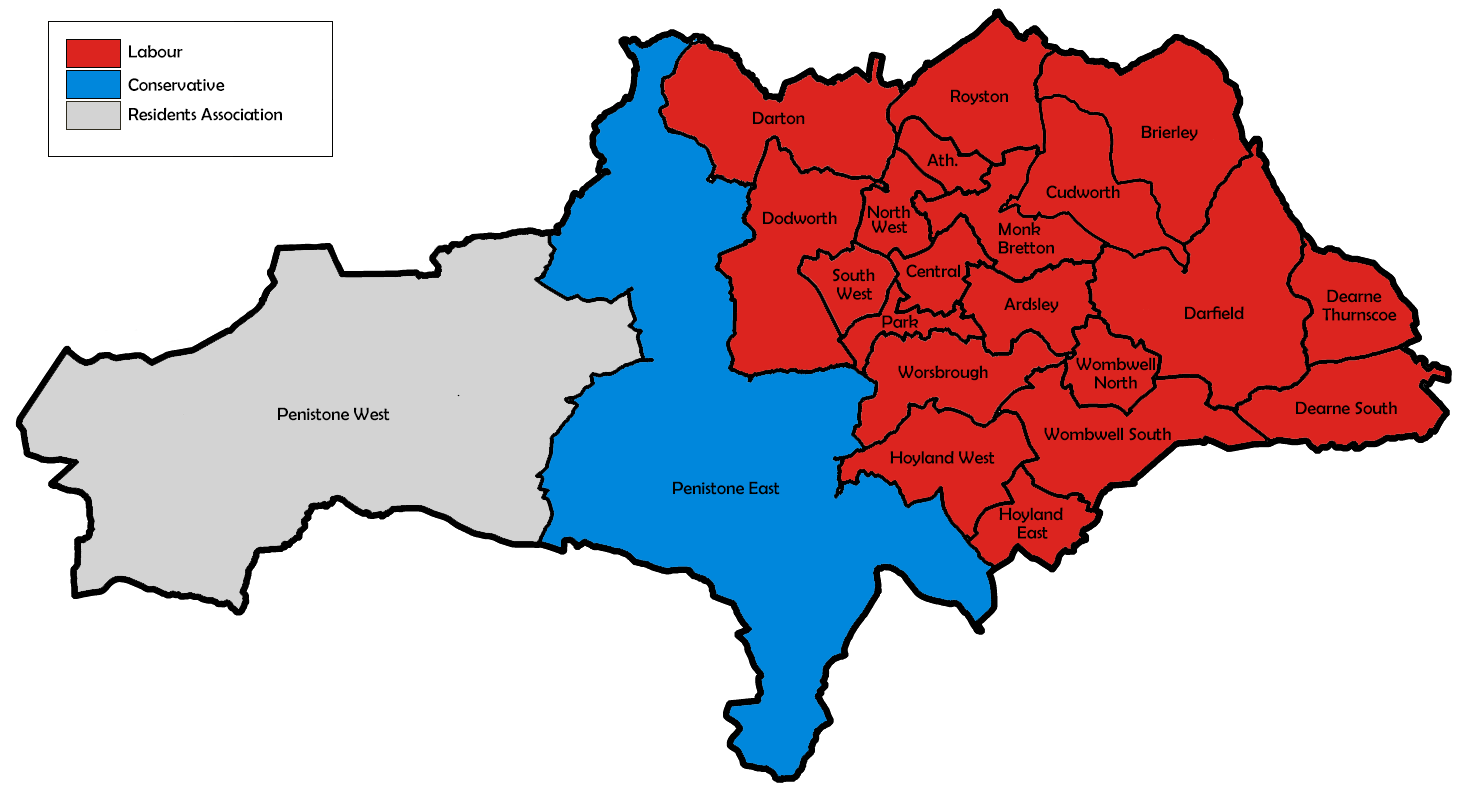
1980 results map

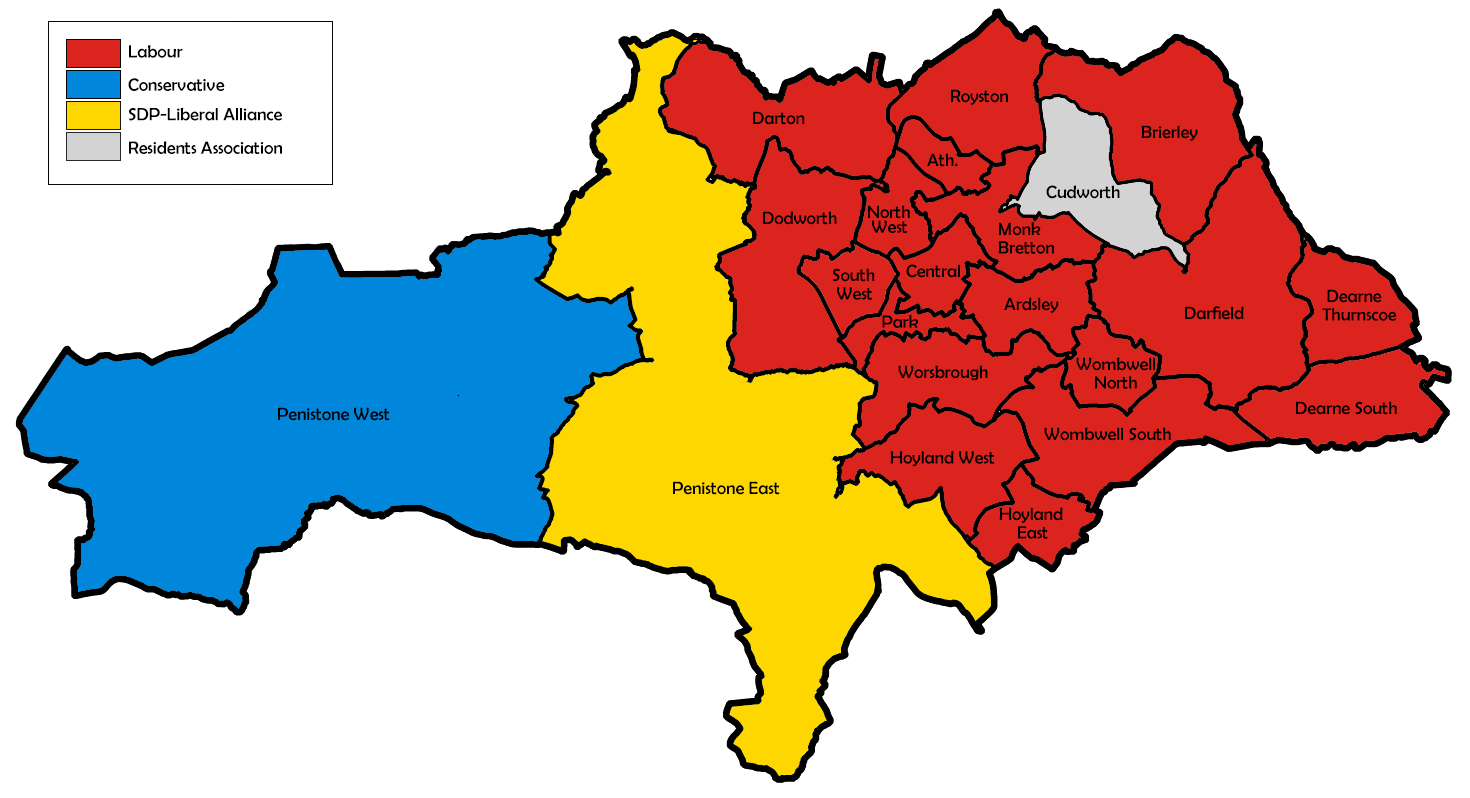
1982 results map

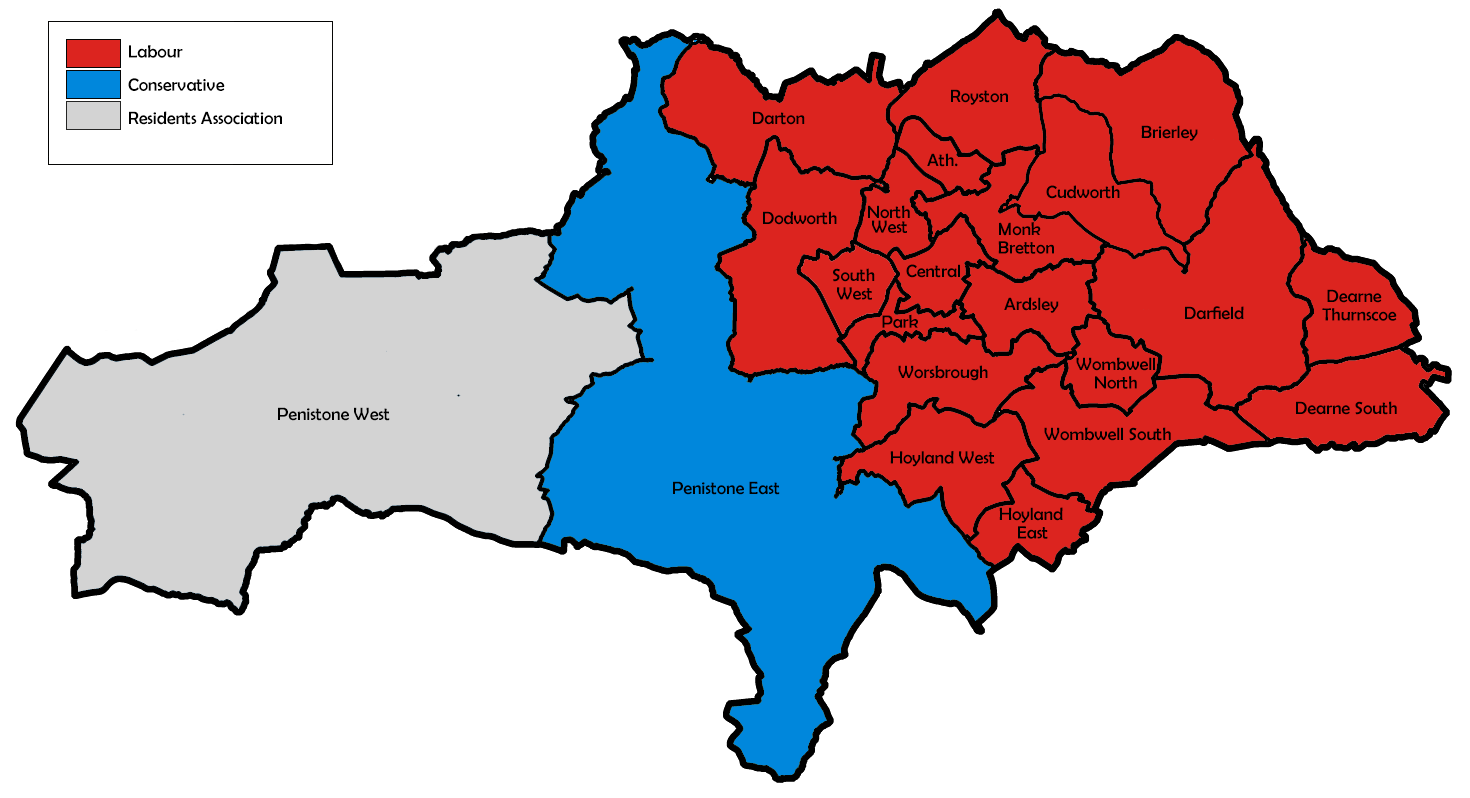
1983 results map

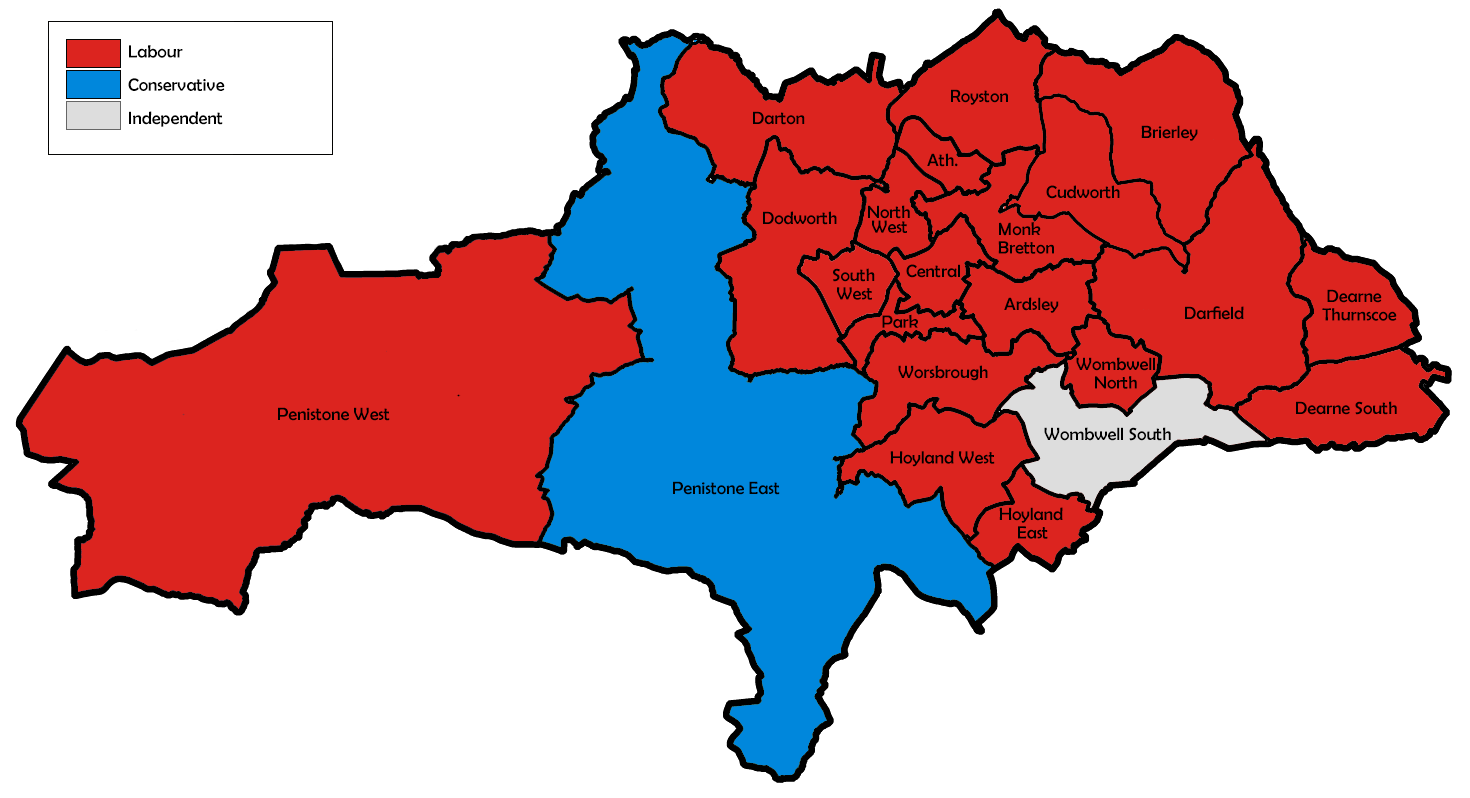
1984 results map

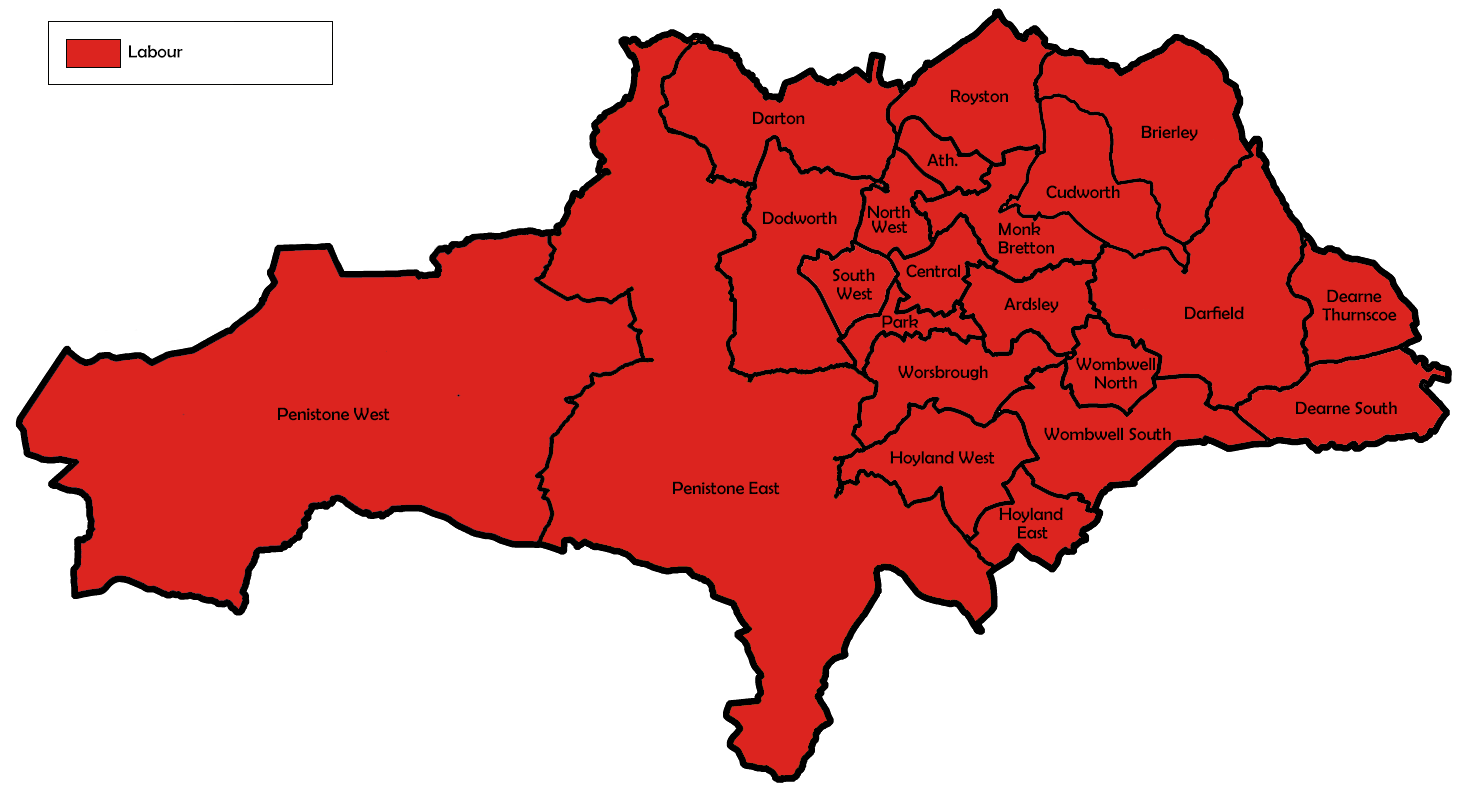
1986 results map

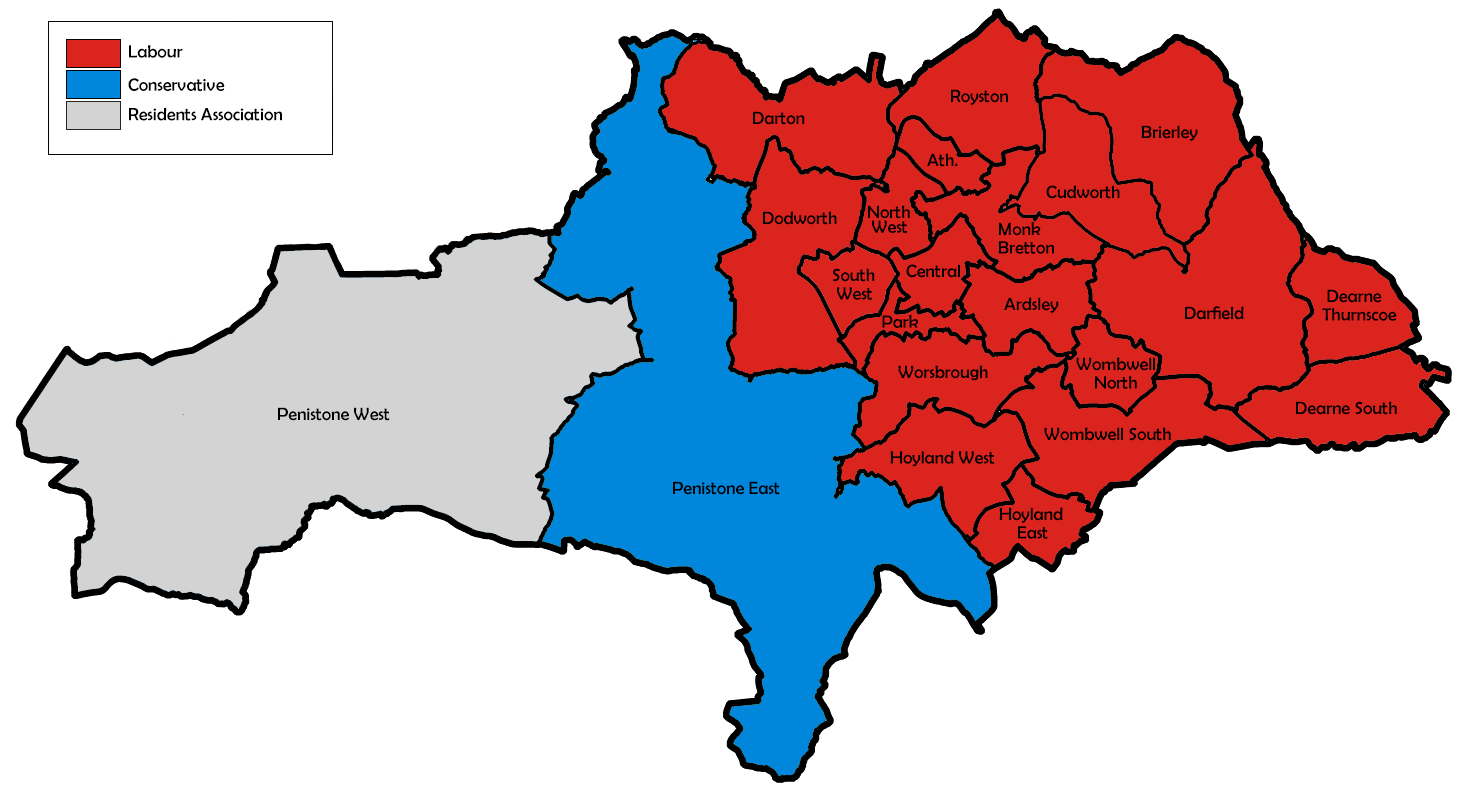
1987 results map

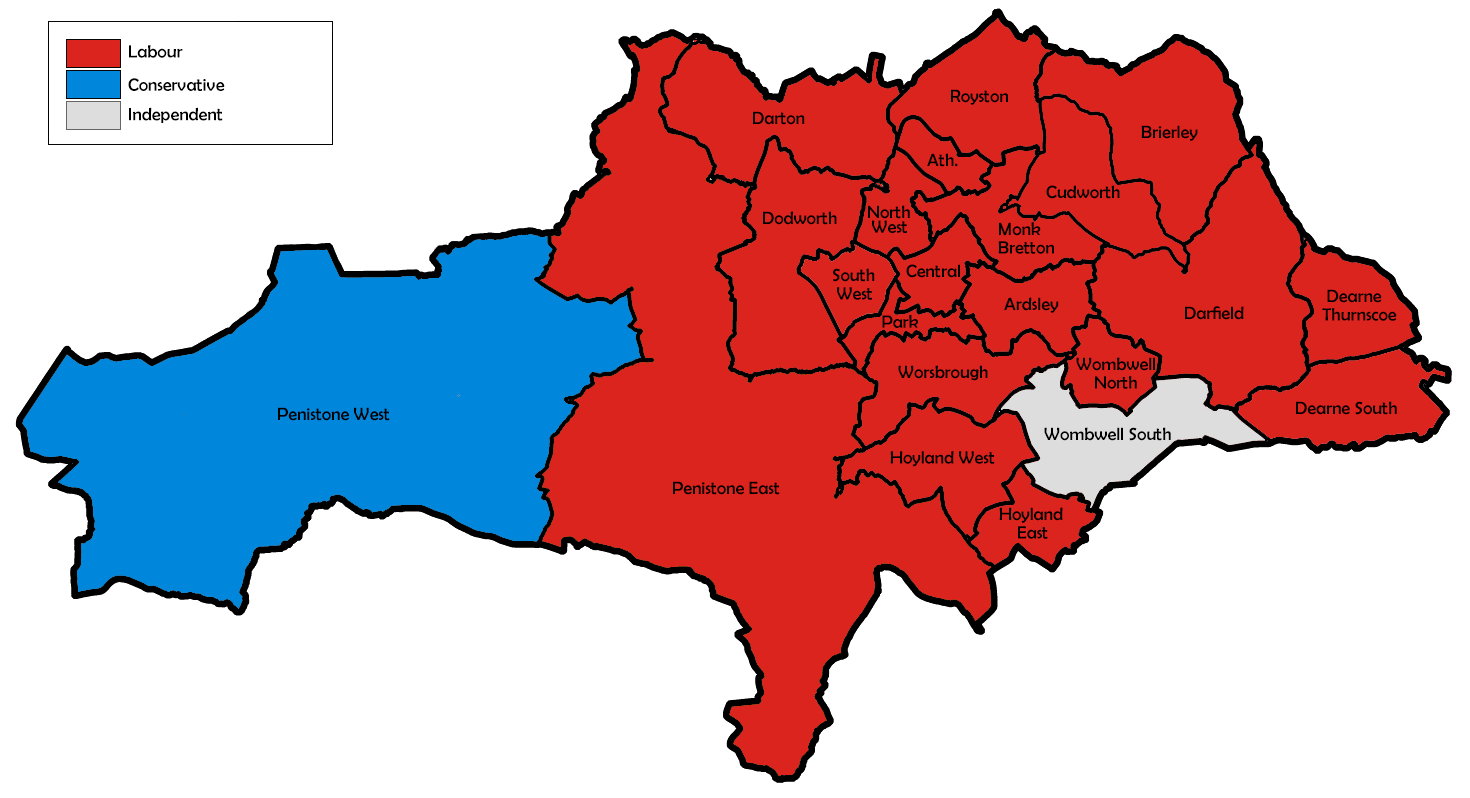
1988 results map

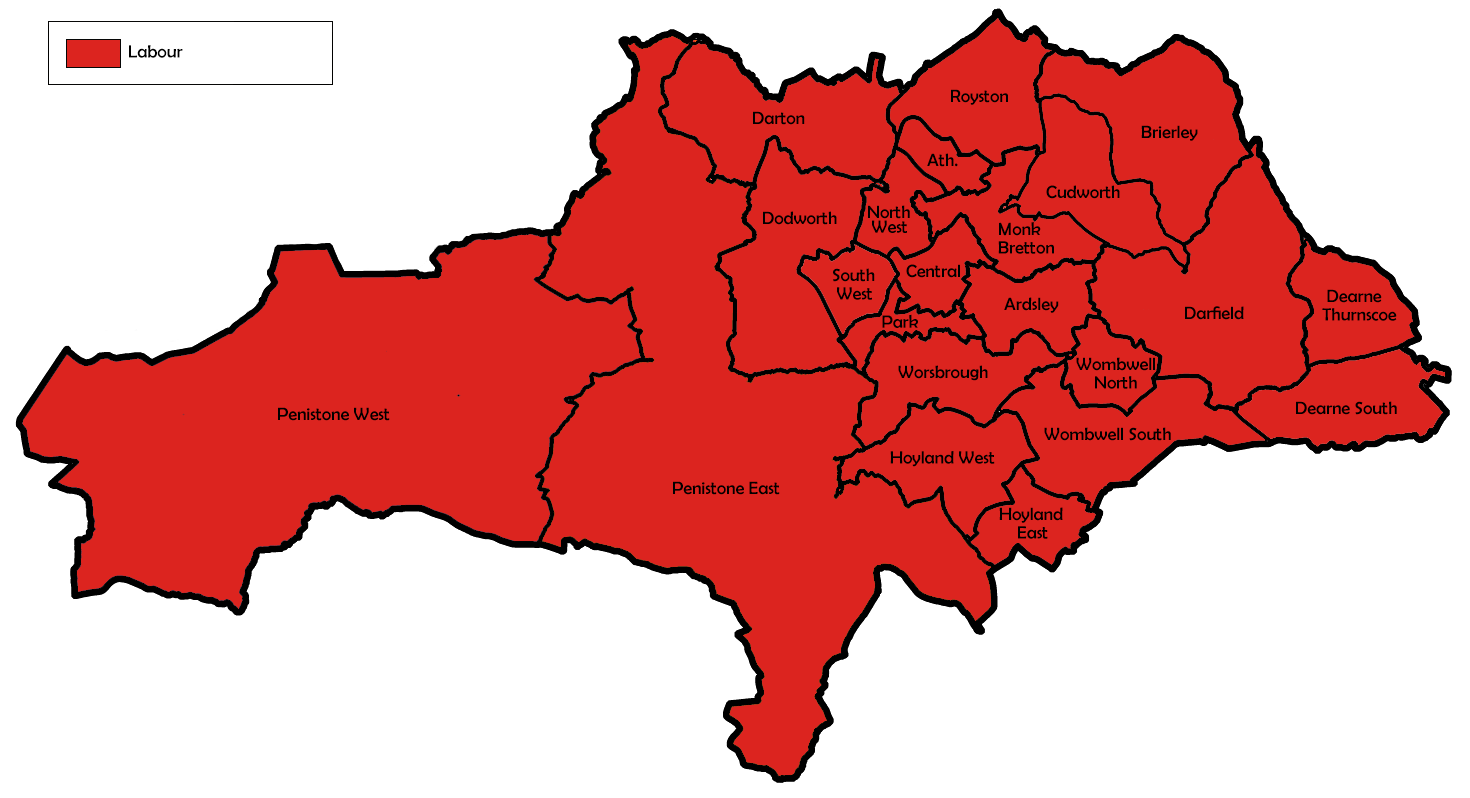
1990 results map

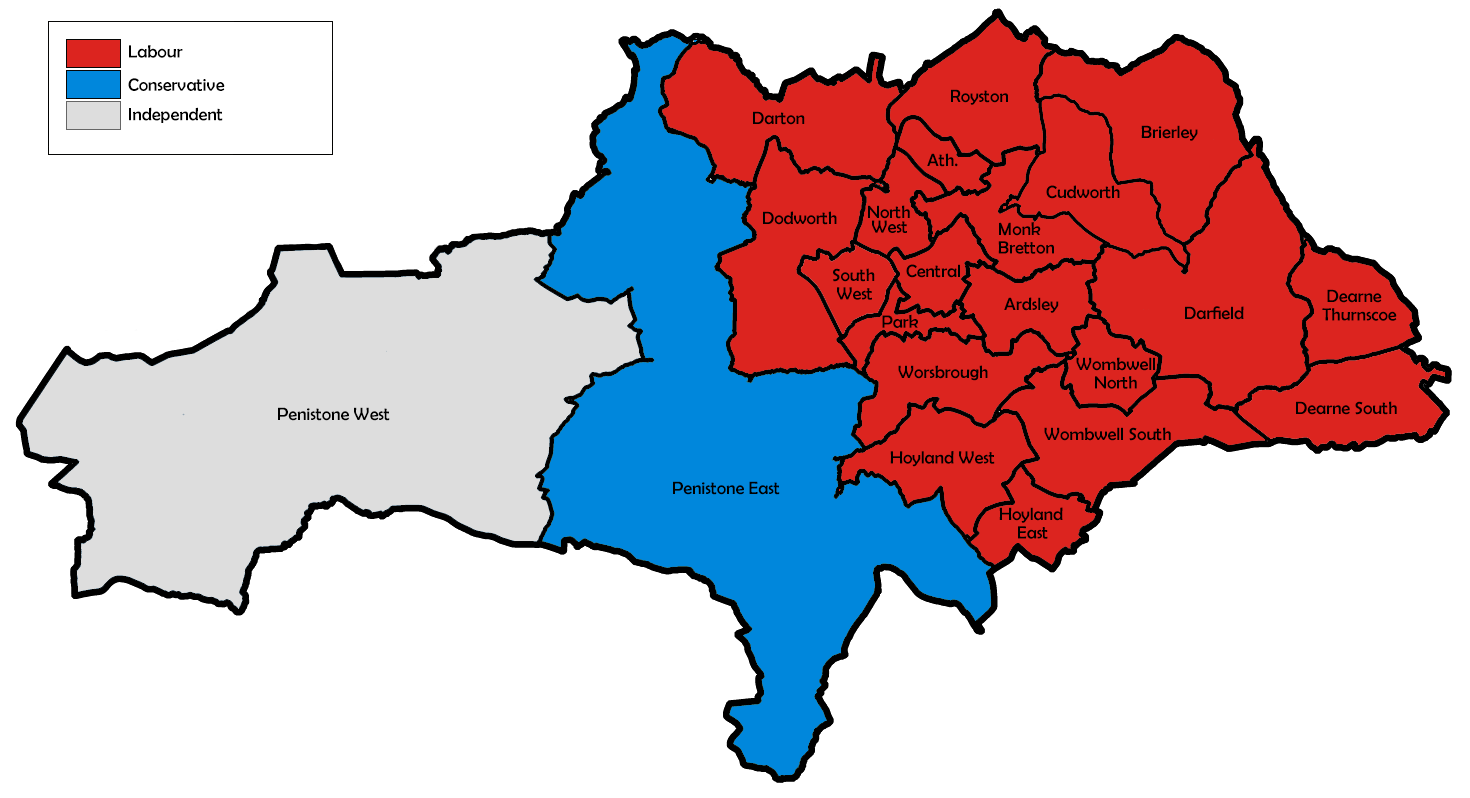
1991 results map

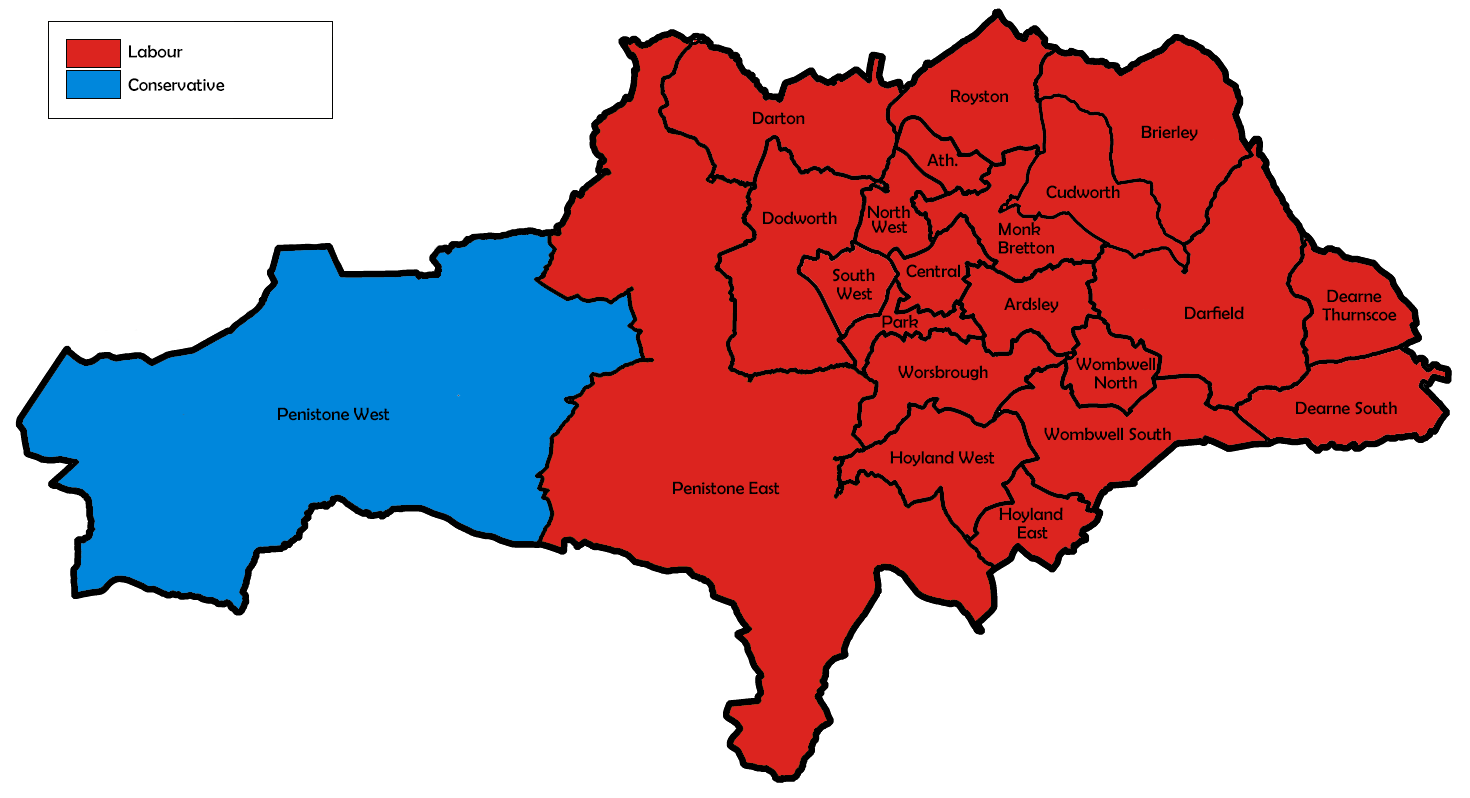
1992 results map

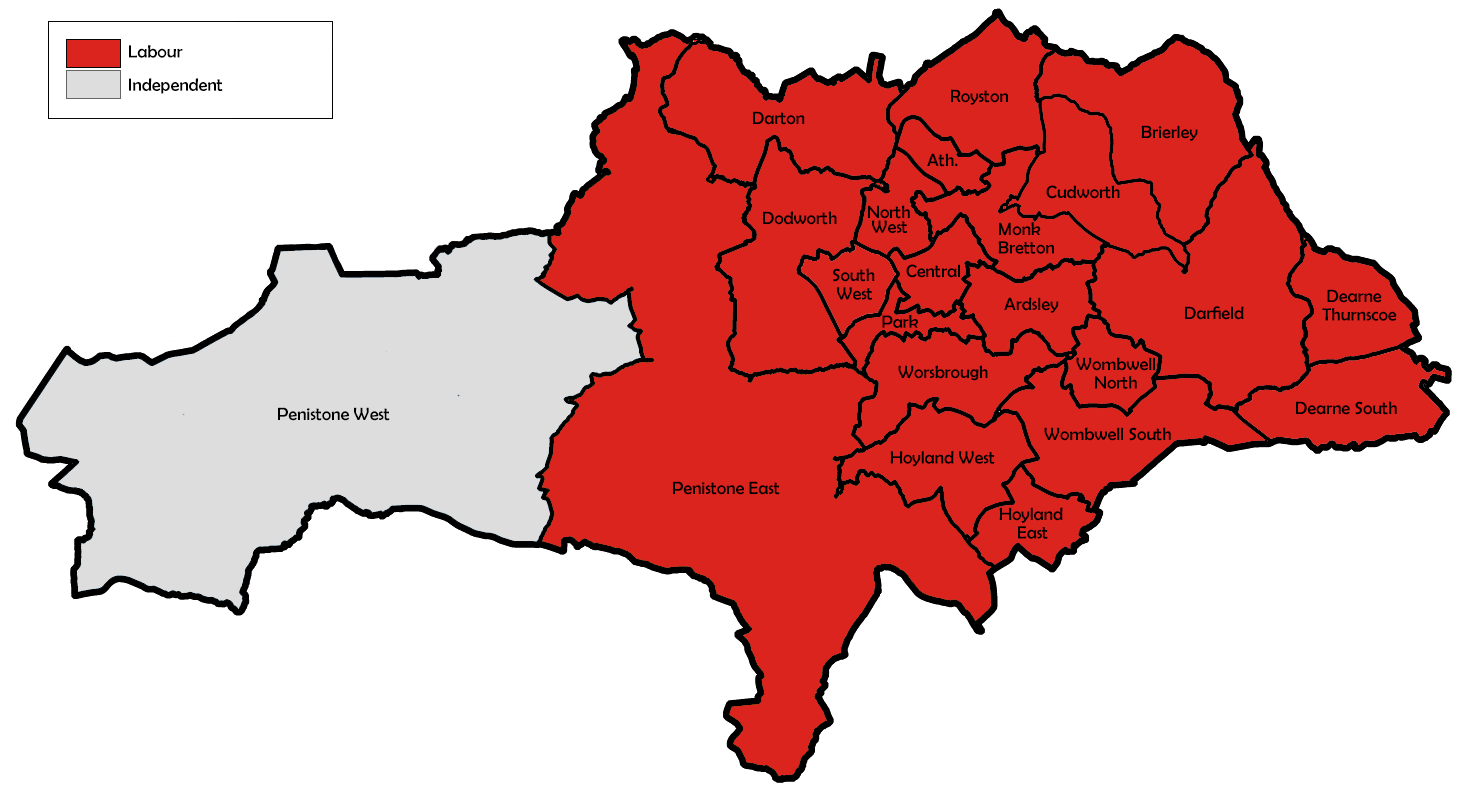
1994 results map

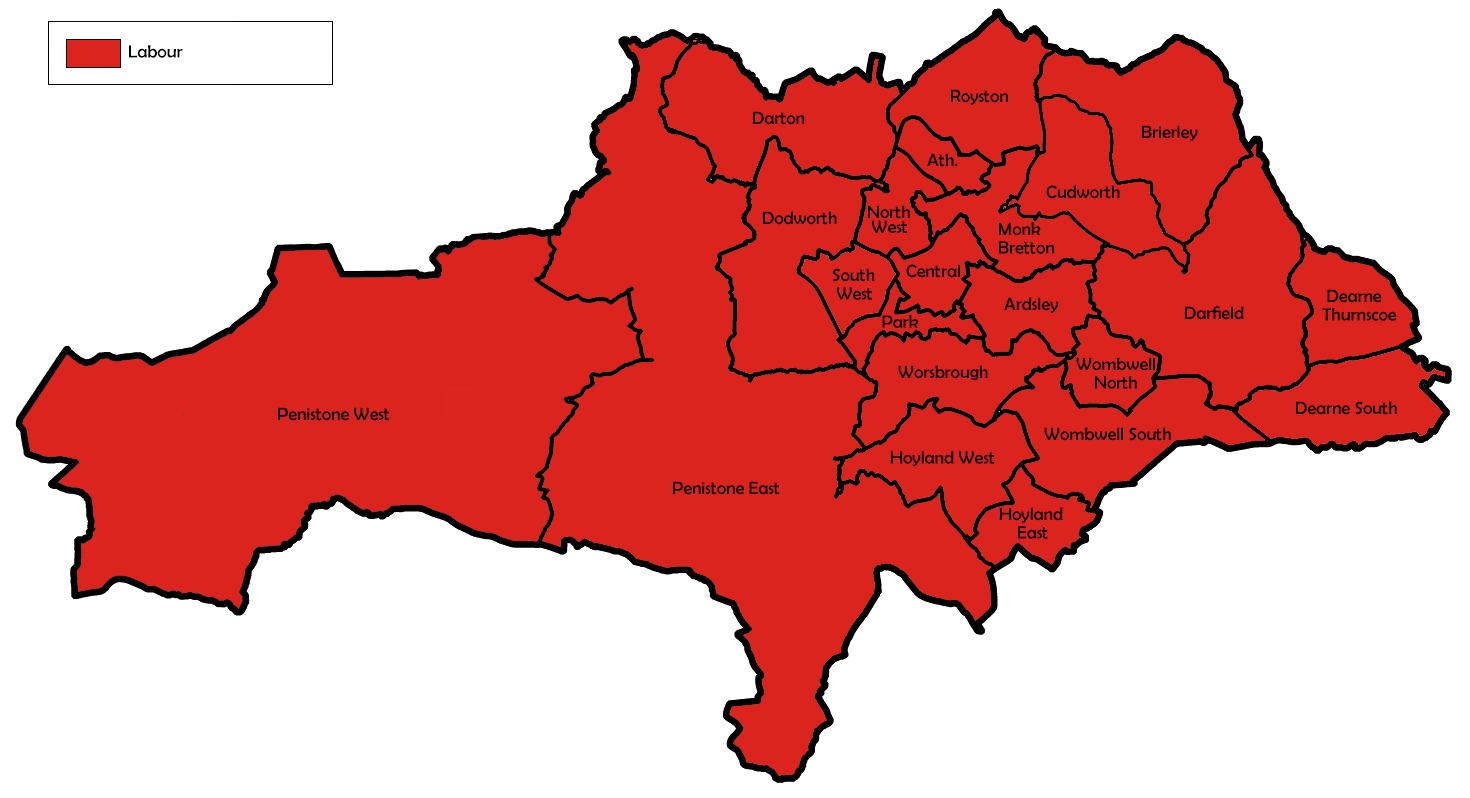
1995 results map

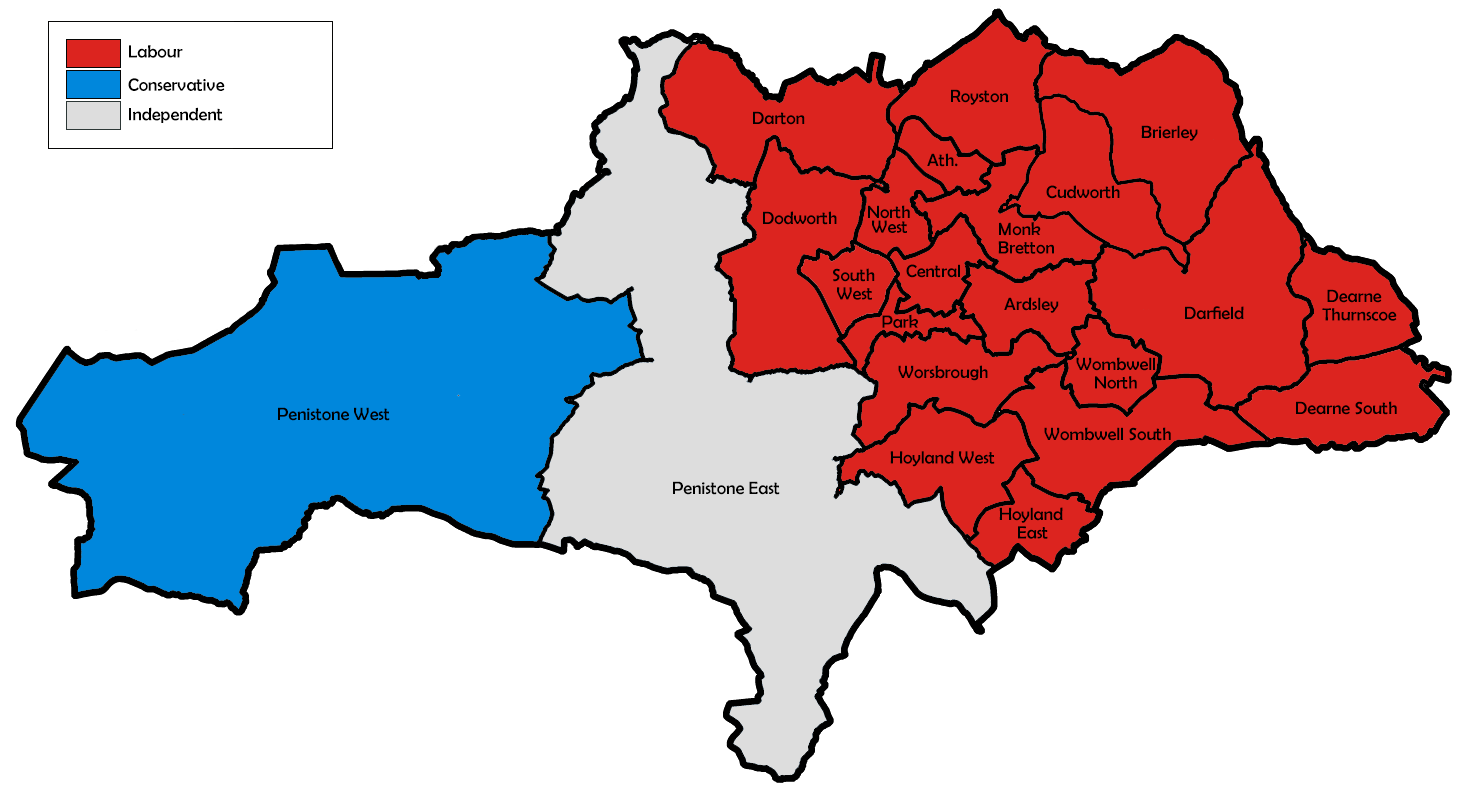
1996 results map

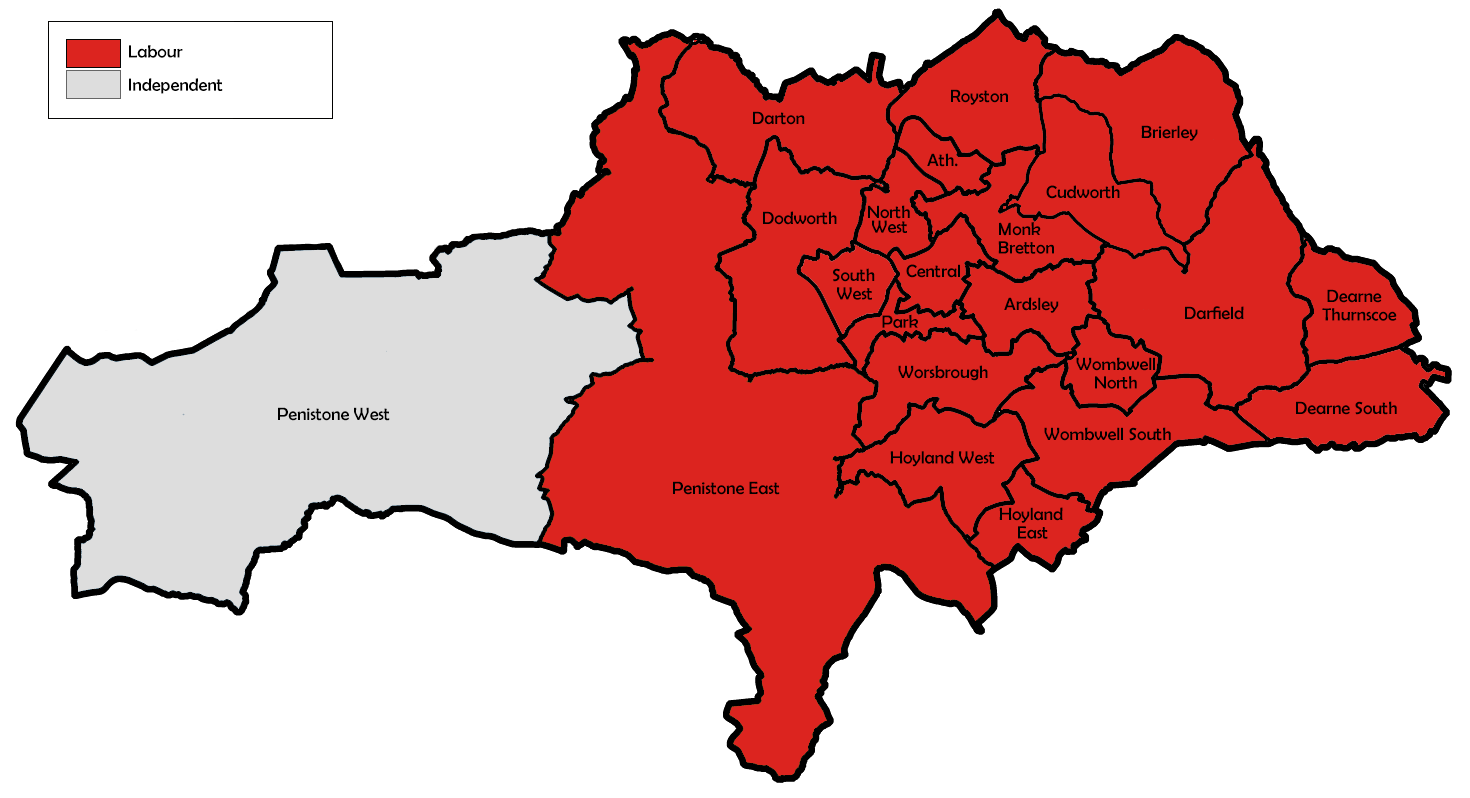
1998 results map

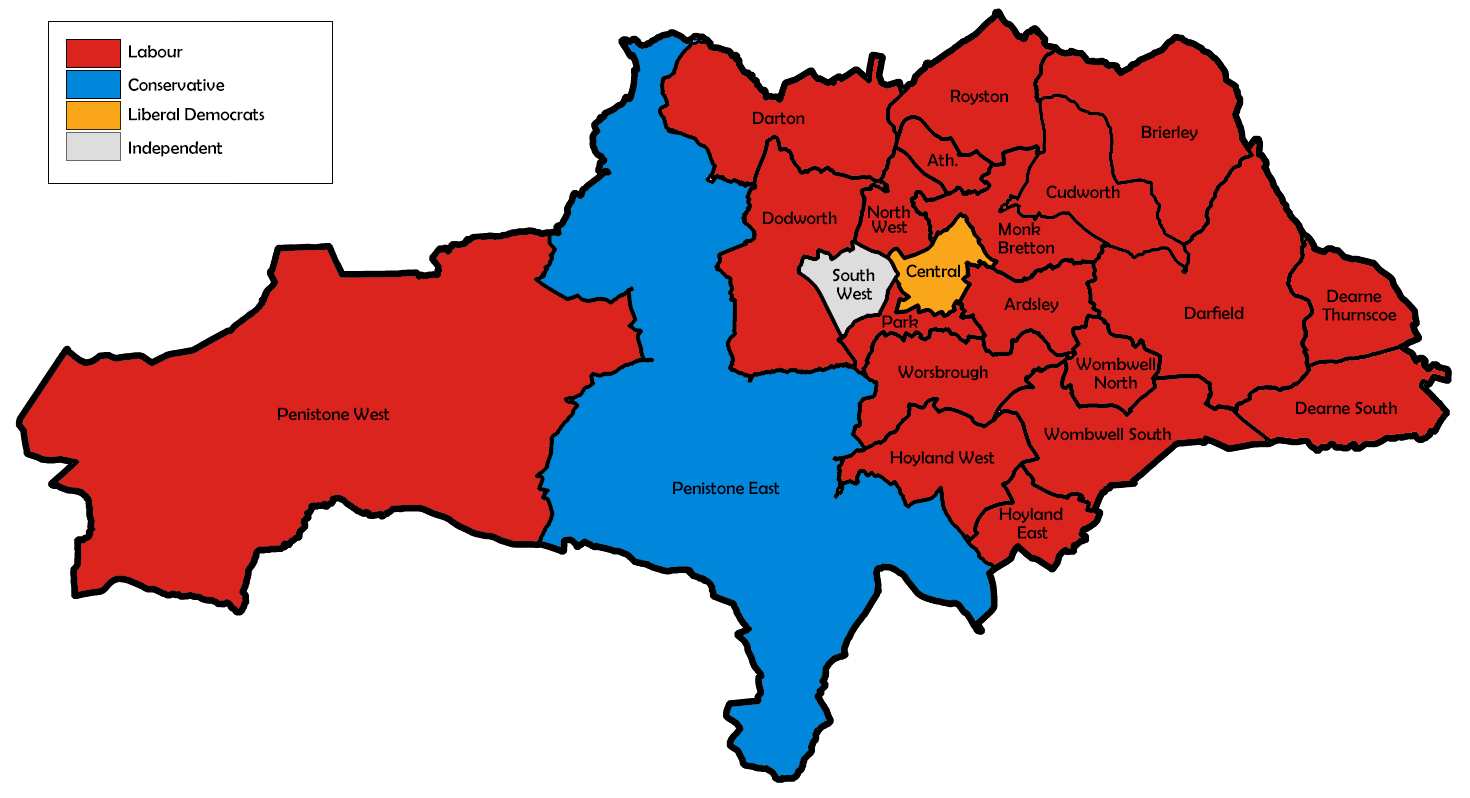
1999 results map

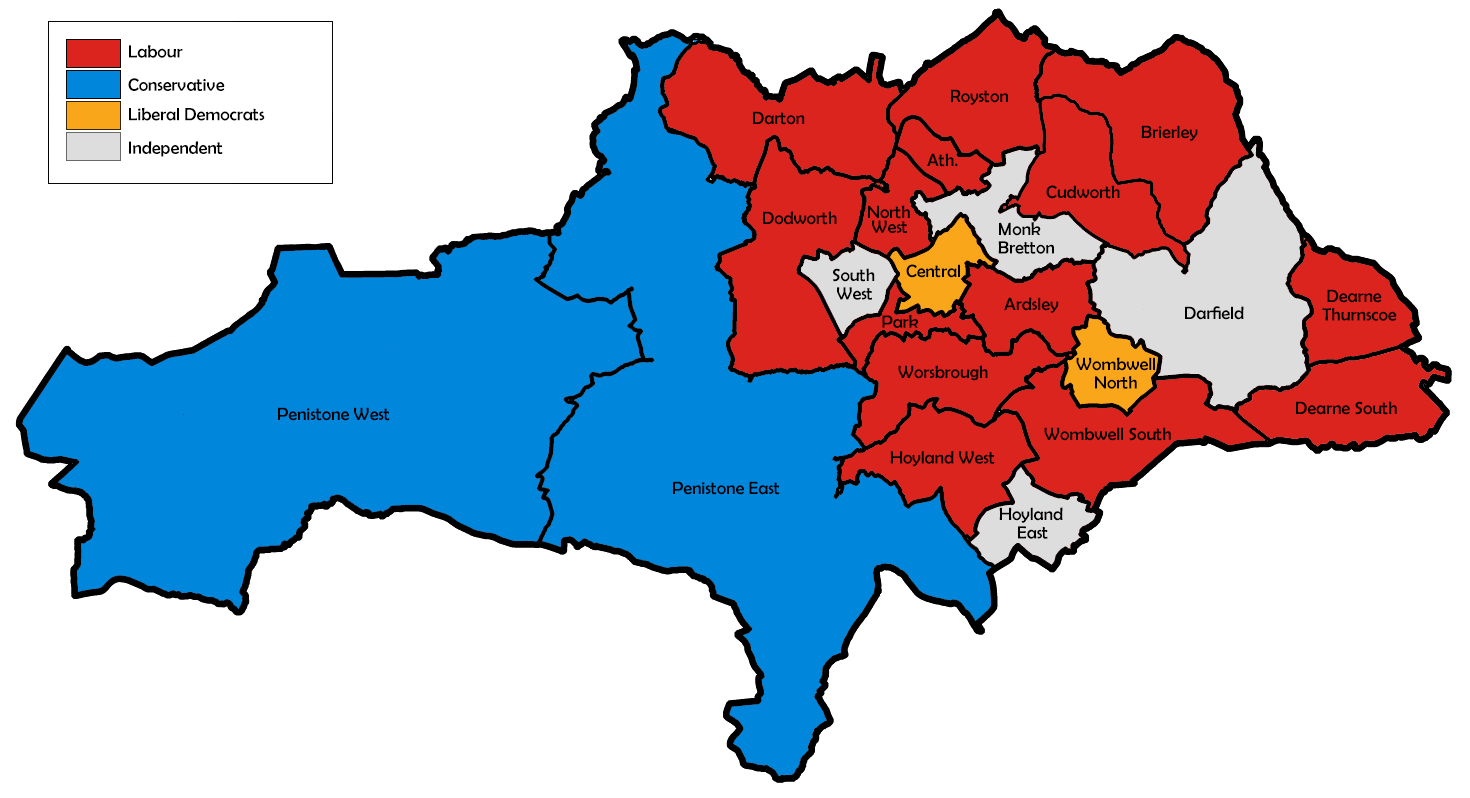
2000 results map

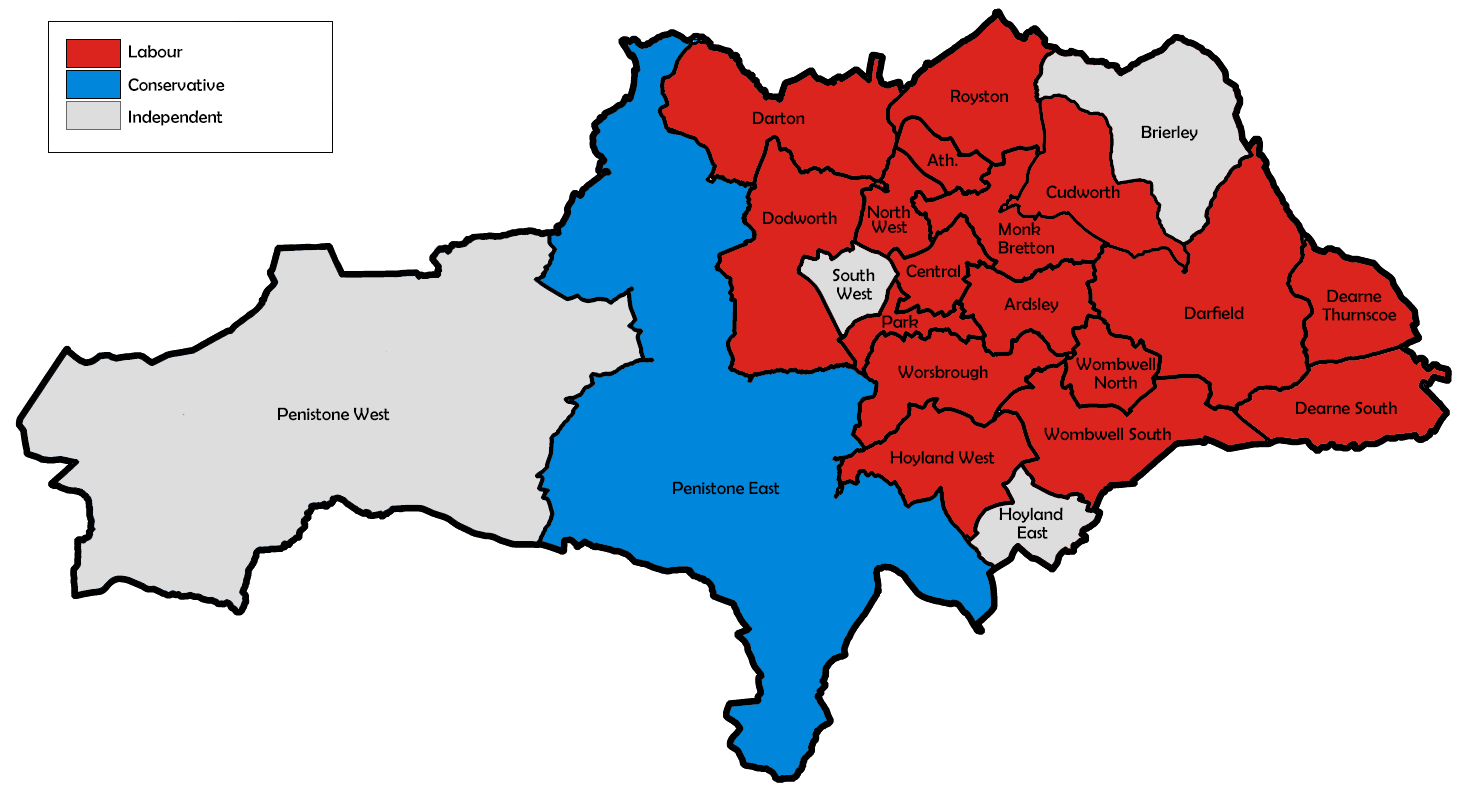
2002 results map

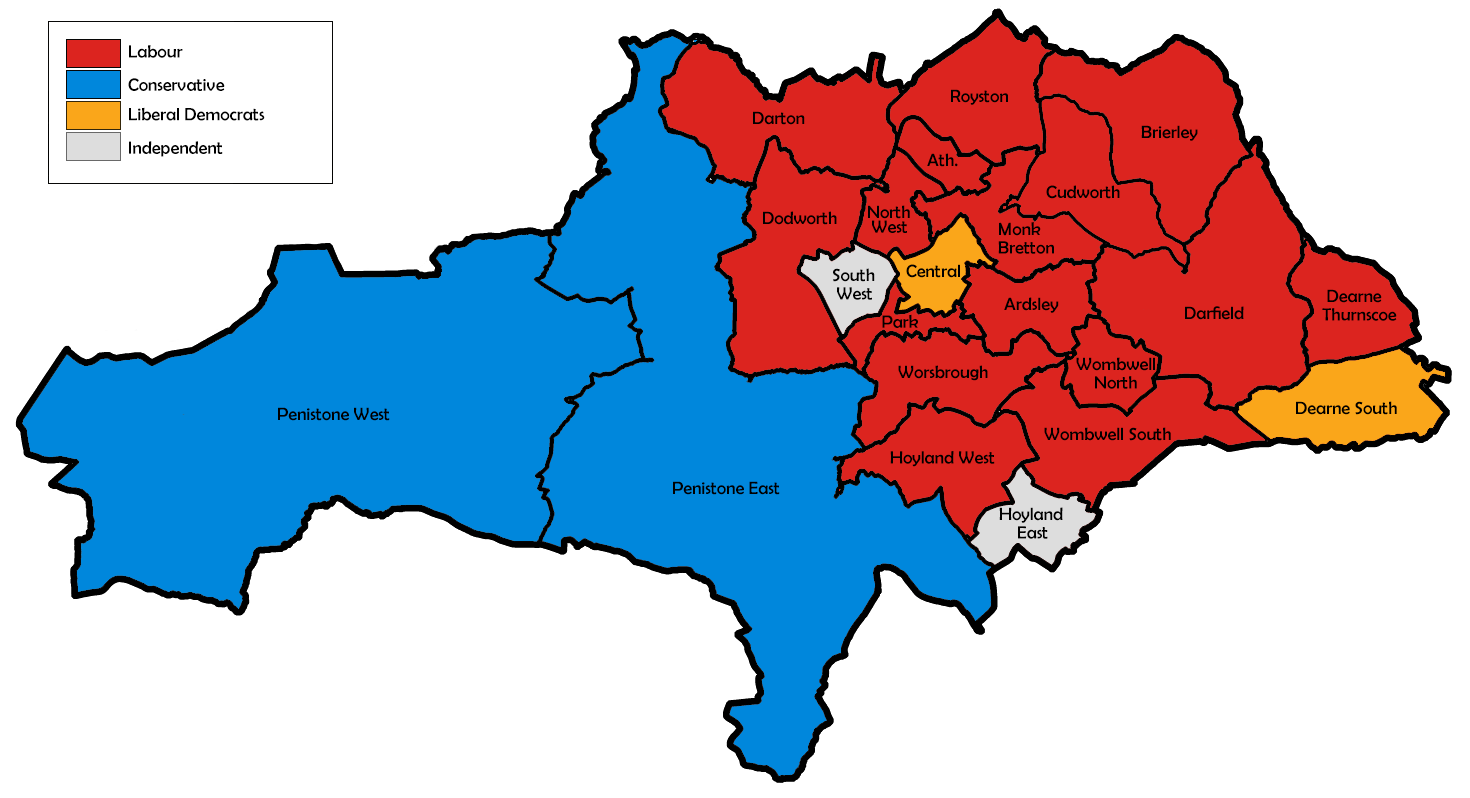
2003 results map

2004 results map

2006 results map

2007 results map

2008 results map

2010 results map

2011 results map

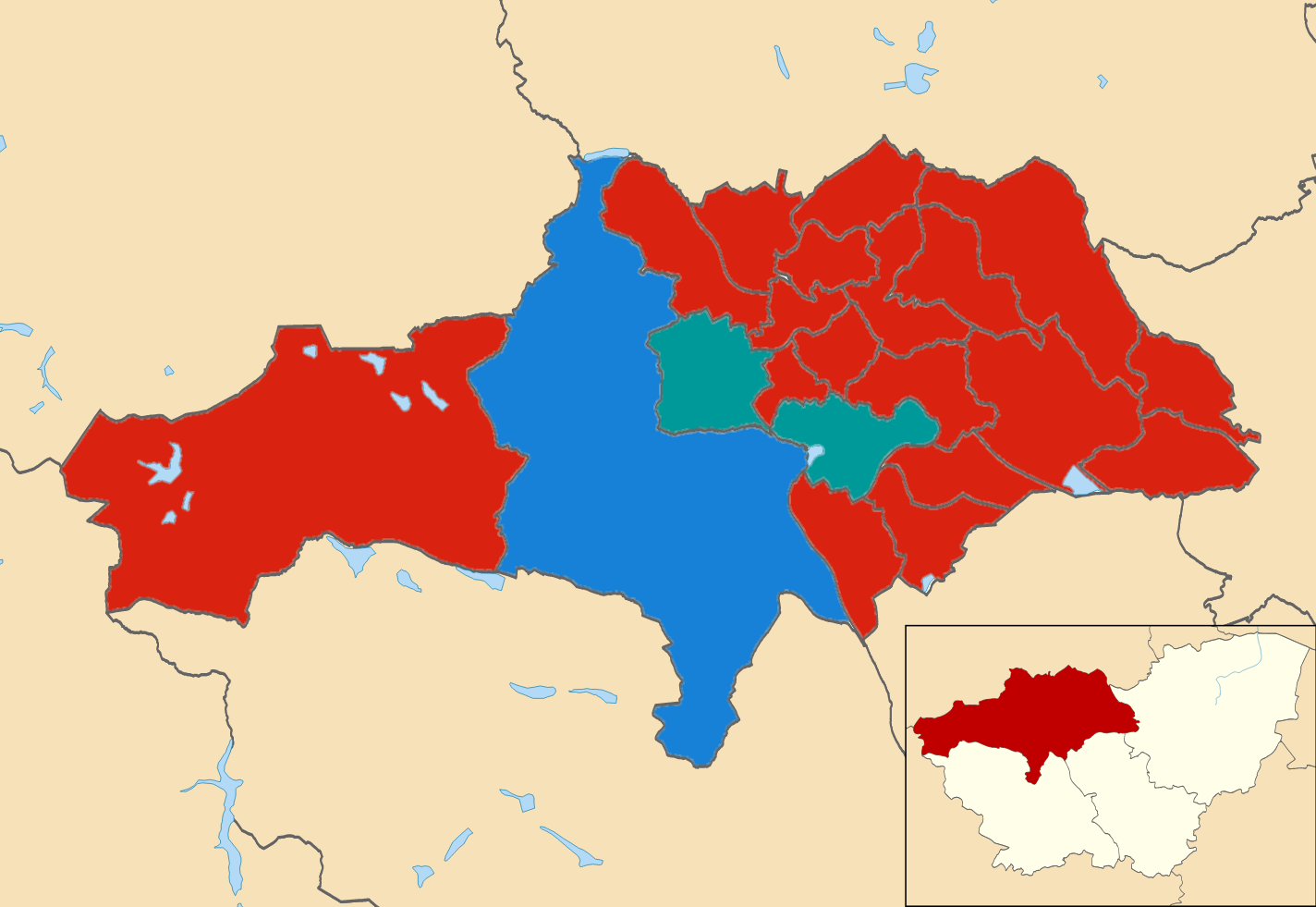
2012 results map

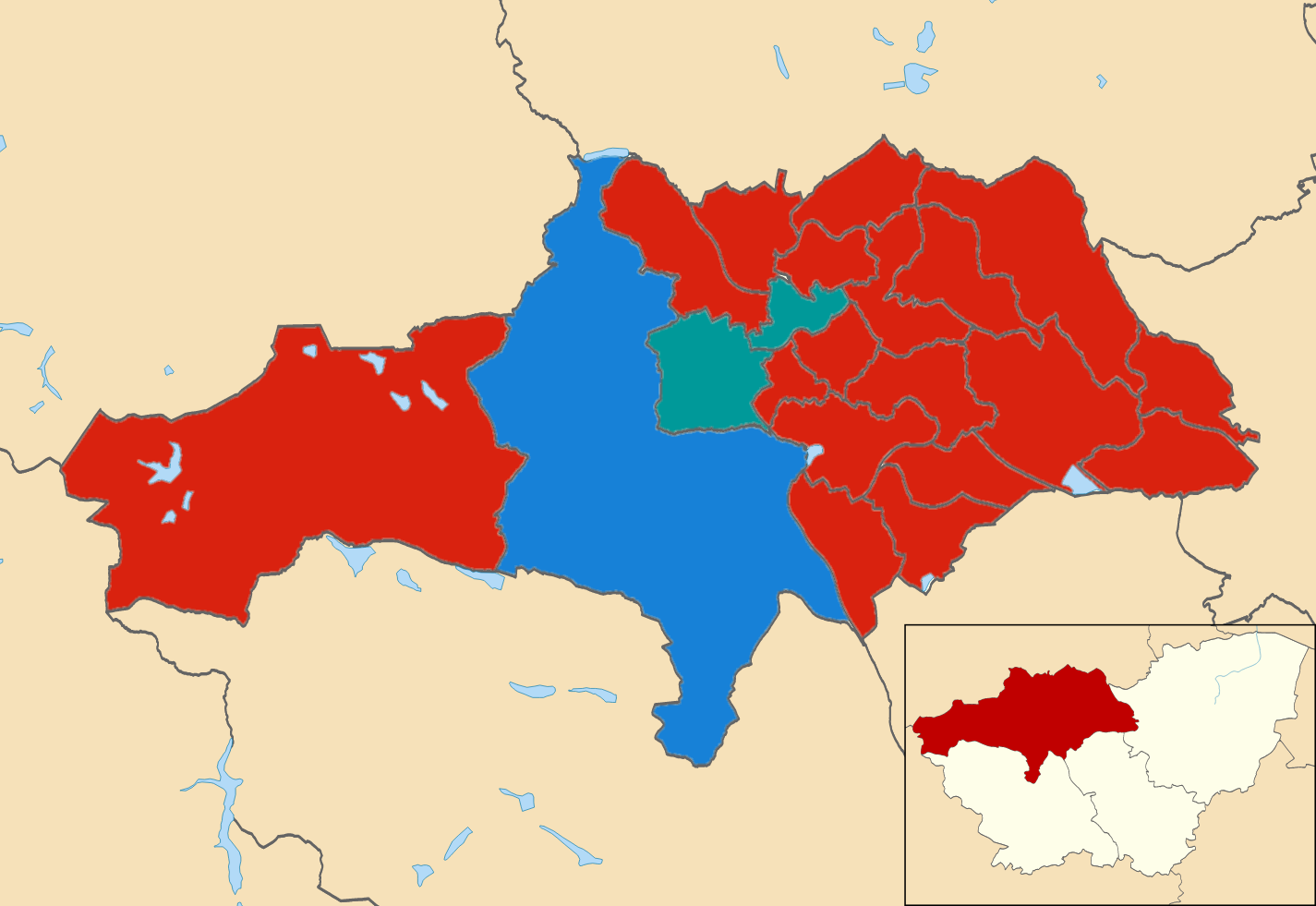
2014 results map

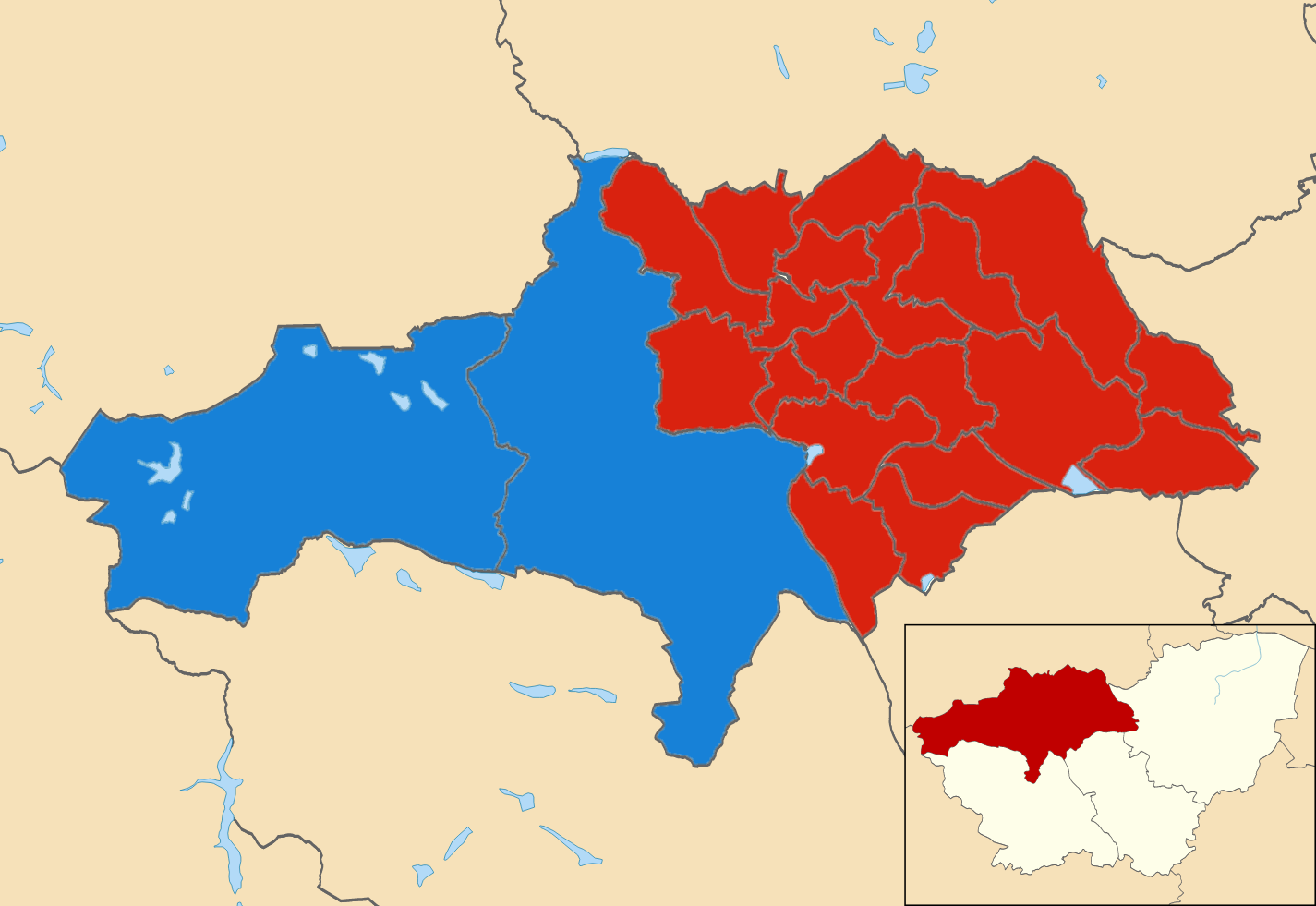
2015 results map

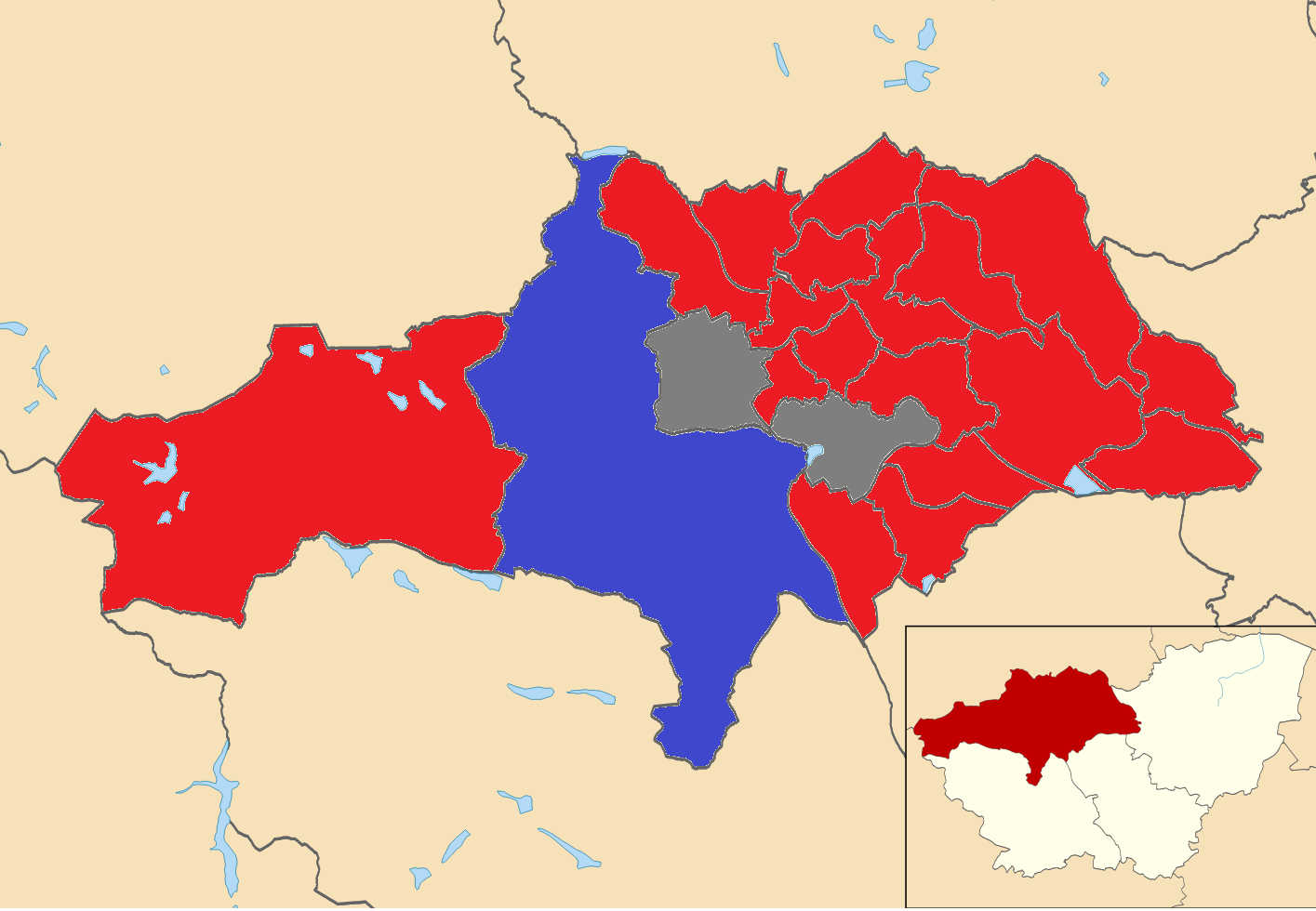
2016 results map

2018 results map

2019 results map

2021 results map

2022 results map

2023 results map

2024 results map

2026 results map

== By-election results ==
| By-election | Date | Incumbent party | Winning party |
|---|---|---|---|
| South West by-election | 29 November 1979 | Residents | Residents |
| Brierley by-election | 25 September 1980 | Labour | Labour |
| Ardsley by-election | 7 May 1981 | Labour | Labour |
| Dodworth by-election | 10 December 1981 | Residents | Labour |
| Penistone East by-election | 18 February 1982 | Labour | Alliance |
| Penistone East by-election | 14 June 1984 | Alliance | Labour |
| Park by-election | 3 May 1985 | Labour | Labour |
| Brierley by-election | 10 July 1986 | Labour | Labour |
| Ardsley by-election | 25 September 1986 | Labour | Labour |
| Cudworth by-election | 30 September 1988 | Labour | Labour |
| Athersley by-election | 27 July 1989 | Labour | Labour |
| Dodworth by-election | 9 April 1992 | Labour | Labour |
| Monk Bretton by-election | 9 April 1992 | Labour | Labour |
| Athersley by-election | 24 September 1992 | Labour | Labour |
| Brierley by-election | 20 May 1993 | Labour | Labour |
| Darton by-election | 8 July 1993 | Labour | Labour |
| Royston by-election | 8 July 1993 | Labour | Labour |
| Dearne South by-election | 14 September 1995 | Labour | Labour |
| Brierley by-election | 20 March 1997 | Labour | Labour |
| Worsbrough by-election | 5 March 1998 | Labour | Labour |
| North West by-election | 18 February 1999 | Labour | Labour |
| South West by-election | 18 February 1999 | Labour | Labour |
| Wombwell North by-election | 18 February 1999 | Labour | Liberal Democrats |
| Hoyland East by-election | 29 July 1999 | Labour | Labour |
| South West by-election | 29 July 1999 | Labour | Independent |
| Dodworth by-election | 7 June 2001 | Labour | Labour |
| Athersley by-election | 7 March 2002 | Labour | Labour |
| Penistone West by-election | 13 July 2006 | Independent | Conservative |
| Worsbrough by-election | 16 November 2006 | Labour | Labour |
| St Helen's by-election | 15 October 2009 | Labour | Labour |
| St Helen's by-election | 13 October 2011 | Labour | Labour |
| Royston by-election | 10 October 2013 | Labour | Labour |
| Penistone West by-election | 10 July 2014 | Labour | Labour |
| Dearne North by-election | 27 August 2015 | Labour | Labour |
| Kingstone by-election | 29 September 2017 | Labour | Labour |
| Rockingham by-election | 14 December 2017 | Labour | Labour |
| Old Town by-election | 12 July 2018 | Labour | Labour |
| Dodworth by-election | 12 December 2024 | Liberal Democrats | Liberal Democrats |
| Penistone East by-election | 20 August 2026 | Reform | Labour |
