= 1992 Barnsley Metropolitan Borough Council election =

1992 local election in England

| ← 1991 | 7 May 1992 | 1994 → |

One third of seats (22 of 66) to Barnsley Metropolitan Borough Council 34 seats needed for a majority
| | First party | Second party | Third party |
|---|---|---|---|
| Party | Labour | Conservative | Liberal Democrats |
| Seats won | 21 | 1 | 0 |
| Seat change | Steady | Steady | Steady |
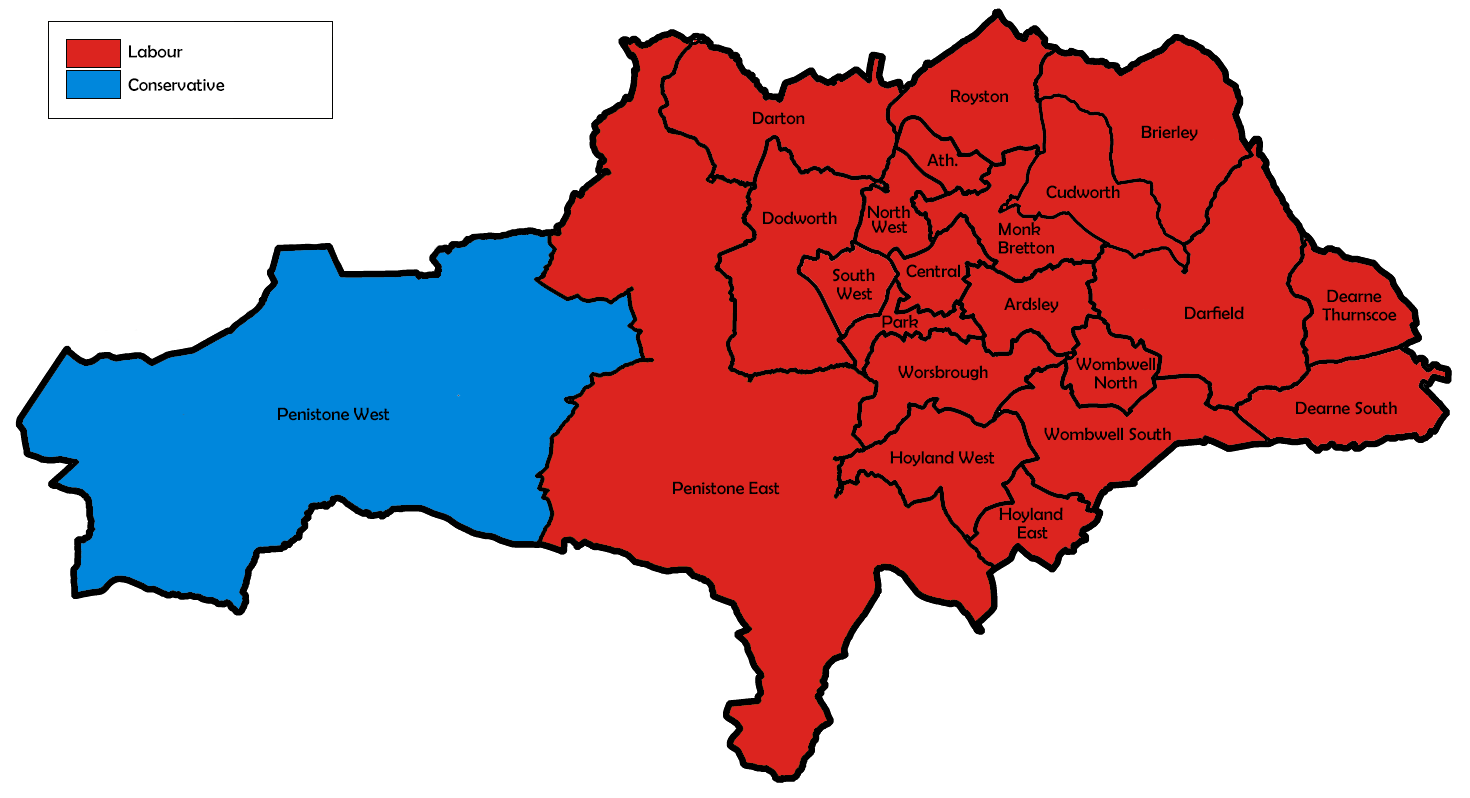
- Map showing the results of the 1992 Barnsley council elections.
Majority party before election
Labour
Majority party after election
Labour

Elections to Barnsley Metropolitan Borough Council were held on 7 May 1992, with one third of the council up for election. The election resulted in Labour retaining control of the council.

== Election result ==
Barnsley Metropolitan Borough Council Election Result 1992
| Party | Seats | Gains | Losses | Net gain/loss | Seats % | Votes % | Votes | +/− |
|---|---|---|---|---|---|---|---|---|
| Labour | 21 | 1 | 0 | +1 | 95.5 | 67.8 | 23,654 | +3.9 |
| Conservative | 1 | 0 | 0 | 0 | 4.5 | 16.6 | 5,801 | -1.0 |
| Liberal Democrats | 0 | 0 | 0 | 0 | 0.0 | 9.3 | 3,240 | +9.3 |
| Green | 0 | 0 | 0 | 0 | 0.0 | 2.9 | 994 | -0.2 |
| Barnsley Party | 0 | 0 | 0 | 0 | 0.0 | 1.5 | 510 | -3.4 |
| Independent | 0 | 0 | 1 | -1 | 0.0 | 1.5 | 507 | -9.0 |
| Independent Labour | 0 | 0 | 0 | 0 | 0.0 | 0.6 | 198 | +0.6 |

This resulted in the following composition of the council:

| Party | Previous council | New council |
|---|---|---|
| Labour | 62 | 63 |
| Conservatives | 2 | 2 |
| Independent | 2 | 1 |
| Total | 66 | 66 |
| Working majority | 58 | 60 |

== Ward results ==
+/- figures represent changes from the last time these wards were contested.

Ardsley (7616)
| Party | Candidate | Votes | % | ±% |
|---|---|---|---|---|
| Labour | Wilson H.* | 992 | 76.5 | N/A |
| Barnsley Party | Ellis R. | 166 | 12.8 | N/A |
| Independent | Barrett C. Ms. | 139 | 10.7 | N/A |
| Majority | | 826 | 63.7 | N/A |
| Turnout | | 1,297 | 17.0 | N/A |
| Labour hold | | Swing | N/A | |

Athersley (6604)
| Party | Candidate | Votes | % | ±% |
|---|---|---|---|---|
| Labour | Bostwick D. | Unopposed | N/A | N/A |
| Labour hold | | Swing | N/A | |

Brierley (7479)
| Party | Candidate | Votes | % | ±% |
|---|---|---|---|---|
| Labour | Whittaker A.* | 1,238 | 66.1 | +7.5 |
| Independent | Vodden N. | 368 | 19.7 | −7.2 |
| Conservative | Schofield D. Ms. | 266 | 14.2 | −0.3 |
| Majority | | 870 | 46.5 | +14.8 |
| Turnout | | 1,872 | 25.0 | −12.8 |
| Labour hold | | Swing | +7.3 | |

Central (8819)
| Party | Candidate | Votes | % | ±% |
|---|---|---|---|---|
| Labour | Watts J. Ms.* | Unopposed | N/A | N/A |
| Labour hold | | Swing | N/A | |

Cudworth (8057)
| Party | Candidate | Votes | % | ±% |
|---|---|---|---|---|
| Labour | Houghton S.* | 1,648 | 82.3 | N/A |
| Conservative | Jobling H. Ms. | 189 | 9.4 | N/A |
| Liberal Democrats | Cowton E. Ms. | 165 | 8.2 | N/A |
| Majority | | 1,459 | 72.9 | N/A |
| Turnout | | 2,002 | 24.8 | N/A |
| Labour hold | | Swing | N/A | |

Darfield (8004)
| Party | Candidate | Votes | % | ±% |
|---|---|---|---|---|
| Labour | Barlow E.* | 1,359 | 77.2 | −4.5 |
| Conservative | Burton J. | 258 | 14.7 | −3.6 |
| Liberal Democrats | Arundel T. Ms. | 143 | 8.1 | +8.1 |
| Majority | | 1,101 | 62.6 | −0.9 |
| Turnout | | 1,760 | 22.0 | −11.1 |
| Labour hold | | Swing | -0.4 | |

Darton (9722)
| Party | Candidate | Votes | % | ±% |
|---|---|---|---|---|
| Labour | Miller P.* | 1,475 | 60.3 | −15.4 |
| Liberal Democrats | Shorthouse A. | 501 | 20.5 | +20.5 |
| Conservative | Elders E. Ms. | 469 | 19.2 | −5.1 |
| Majority | | 974 | 39.8 | −11.6 |
| Turnout | | 2,445 | 25.1 | −7.2 |
| Labour hold | | Swing | -17.9 | |

Dearne South (9040)
| Party | Candidate | Votes | % | ±% |
|---|---|---|---|---|
| Labour | Thomson J.* | 1,981 | 88.6 | N/A |
| Liberal Democrats | Mosley A. | 255 | 11.4 | N/A |
| Majority | | 1,726 | 77.2 | N/A |
| Turnout | | 2,236 | 24.7 | N/A |
| Labour hold | | Swing | N/A | |

Dearne Thurnscoe (8373)
| Party | Candidate | Votes | % | ±% |
|---|---|---|---|---|
| Labour | Young K.* | Unopposed | N/A | N/A |
| Labour hold | | Swing | N/A | |

Dodworth (9441)
| Party | Candidate | Votes | % | ±% |
|---|---|---|---|---|
| Labour | Ryan J.* | 1,448 | 64.3 | −0.9 |
| Green | Jones D. | 805 | 35.7 | +19.4 |
| Majority | | 643 | 28.5 | −18.3 |
| Turnout | | 2,253 | 23.9 | −13.3 |
| Labour hold | | Swing | -10.1 | |

Hoyland East (8060)
| Party | Candidate | Votes | % | ±% |
|---|---|---|---|---|
| Labour | Beardshall P.* | Unopposed | N/A | N/A |
| Labour hold | | Swing | N/A | |

Hoyland West (6874)
| Party | Candidate | Votes | % | ±% |
|---|---|---|---|---|
| Labour | Wroe C.* | 1,117 | 65.7 | N/A |
| Liberal Democrats | Armer B. | 384 | 22.6 | N/A |
| Independent Labour | Newnbold A. | 198 | 11.7 | N/A |
| Majority | | 733 | 43.1 | N/A |
| Turnout | | 1,699 | 24.7 | N/A |
| Labour hold | | Swing | N/A | |

Monk Bretton (8949)
| Party | Candidate | Votes | % | ±% |
|---|---|---|---|---|
| Labour | Sheard T.* | 1,164 | 78.7 | +7.2 |
| Conservative | Fisher G. | 190 | 12.8 | +12.8 |
| Barnsley Party | Swapisz P. | 125 | 8.5 | −20.0 |
| Majority | | 974 | 65.9 | +22.8 |
| Turnout | | 1,479 | 16.5 | −12.8 |
| Labour hold | | Swing | -2.8 | |

North West (7413)
| Party | Candidate | Votes | % | ±% |
|---|---|---|---|---|
| Labour | Denton W.* | 938 | 60.2 | −9.4 |
| Conservative | Carrington C. Ms. | 515 | 33.1 | +2.8 |
| Barnsley Party | Holderness B. | 104 | 6.7 | +6.7 |
| Majority | | 423 | 27.2 | −12.2 |
| Turnout | | 1,557 | 21.0 | −6.6 |
| Labour hold | | Swing | -6.1 | |

Park (5252)
| Party | Candidate | Votes | % | ±% |
|---|---|---|---|---|
| Labour | Doyle P. | 1,239 | 79.2 | N/A |
| Liberal Democrats | Cowton S. | 326 | 20.8 | N/A |
| Majority | | 913 | 58.3 | N/A |
| Turnout | | 1,565 | 29.8 | N/A |
| Labour hold | | Swing | N/A | |

Penistone East (7424)
| Party | Candidate | Votes | % | ±% |
|---|---|---|---|---|
| Labour | Smith L. Ms.* | 1,470 | 48.5 | +7.3 |
| Conservative | Rawson R. Ms. | 1,241 | 40.9 | −8.3 |
| Liberal Democrats | Marshall J. Ms. | 321 | 10.6 | +10.6 |
| Majority | | 229 | 7.6 | −0.4 |
| Turnout | | 3,032 | 40.8 | −11.5 |
| Labour hold | | Swing | +7.8 | |

Penistone West (8460)
| Party | Candidate | Votes | % | ±% |
|---|---|---|---|---|
| Conservative | Hinchliff B. Ms.* | 1,823 | 59.0 | +59.0 |
| Labour | Boaler M. | 1,078 | 34.9 | +0.6 |
| Green | Wood A. Ms. | 189 | 6.1 | +6.1 |
| Majority | | 745 | 24.1 | −7.3 |
| Turnout | | 3,090 | 36.5 | −5.7 |
| Conservative hold | | Swing | +29.2 | |

Royston (8821)
| Party | Candidate | Votes | % | ±% |
|---|---|---|---|---|
| Labour | Newman W.* | 1,451 | 81.0 | +5.3 |
| Conservative | Oldfield H. | 226 | 12.6 | +12.6 |
| Barnsley Party | Sheriff J. | 115 | 6.4 | −17.9 |
| Majority | | 1,225 | 68.4 | +17.0 |
| Turnout | | 1,792 | 20.3 | −12.0 |
| Labour hold | | Swing | -3.6 | |

South West (7691)
| Party | Candidate | Votes | % | ±% |
|---|---|---|---|---|
| Labour | McCormick R.* | 1,293 | 67.4 | N/A |
| Conservative | Carrington J. | 624 | 32.6 | N/A |
| Majority | | 669 | 34.9 | N/A |
| Turnout | | 1,917 | 24.9 | N/A |
| Labour hold | | Swing | N/A | |

Wombwell North (5296)
| Party | Candidate | Votes | % | ±% |
|---|---|---|---|---|
| Labour | Storey A.* | 777 | 80.1 | N/A |
| Liberal Democrats | Dearle E. Ms. | 193 | 19.9 | N/A |
| Majority | | 584 | 60.2 | N/A |
| Turnout | | 970 | 18.3 | N/A |
| Labour hold | | Swing | N/A | |

Wombwell South (8300)
| Party | Candidate | Votes | % | ±% |
|---|---|---|---|---|
| Labour | Cross A. Ms. | 1,474 | 76.1 | N/A |
| Liberal Democrats | Newton E. Ms. | 464 | 23.9 | N/A |
| Majority | | 1,010 | 52.1 | N/A |
| Turnout | | 1,938 | 23.3 | N/A |
| Labour gain from Independent | | Swing | N/A | |

Worsbrough (8228)
| Party | Candidate | Votes | % | ±% |
|---|---|---|---|---|
| Labour | Hadfield G.* | 1,512 | 75.6 | −8.2 |
| Liberal Democrats | Newton M. | 488 | 24.4 | +24.4 |
| Majority | | 1,024 | 51.2 | −16.5 |
| Turnout | | 2,000 | 24.3 | −8.8 |
| Labour hold | | Swing | -16.3 | |

== By-elections between 1992 and 1994 ==
Athersley (6604) 24 September 1992 By-election
| Party | Candidate | Votes | % | ±% |
|---|---|---|---|---|
| Labour | Woodhead, M. | 936 | 88.2 | N/A |
| Liberal Democrats | Lewis, B. | 125 | 11.8 | N/A |
| Majority | | 811 | 75.7 | N/A |
| Turnout | | 1,061 | 16.1 | N/A |
| Labour hold | | Swing | N/A | |

Brierley (7410) 20 May 1993 By-election
| Party | Candidate | Votes | % | ±% |
|---|---|---|---|---|
| Labour | Tarn, P. T. | 890 | 49.4 | −16.7 |
| Independent | Schofield D. Ms. | 599 | 33.2 | +33.2 |
| Honest Independent | Vodden N. | 239 | 13.3 | −6.4 |
| Liberal Democrats | Cowton, S. R. | 74 | 4.1 | +4.1 |
| Majority | | 291 | 16.2 | −30.3 |
| Turnout | | 1,802 | 24.3 | −0.7 |
| Labour hold | | Swing | -24.9 | |

Darton (10259) 8 July 1993 By-election
| Party | Candidate | Votes | % | ±% |
|---|---|---|---|---|
| Labour | Shepherd, J. M. | 1,583 | 82.1 | +21.8 |
| Liberal Democrats | Shorthouse, A. M. | 346 | 17.9 | −2.6 |
| Majority | | 1,237 | 64.2 | +24.4 |
| Turnout | | 1,929 | 18.8 | −6.3 |
| Labour hold | | Swing | +12.2 | |

Royston (8803) 8 July 1993 By-election
| Party | Candidate | Votes | % | ±% |
|---|---|---|---|---|
| Labour | Horsley, D. | 833 | 65.2 | −15.8 |
| Liberal Democrats | Dearle, E. | 444 | 34.8 | +34.8 |
| Majority | | 389 | 30.4 | −38.0 |
| Turnout | | 1,277 | 14.5 | −5.8 |
| Labour hold | | Swing | -25.3 | |
