= 1991 Barnsley Metropolitan Borough Council election =

1991 local election in England

← 1990	2 May 1991	1992 →

One third of seats (22 of 66) to Barnsley Metropolitan Borough Council 34 seats needed for a majority
	First party	Second party	Third party
Party	Labour	Conservative	Independent
Seats won	20	1	1
Seat change	Steady	Steady	Steady
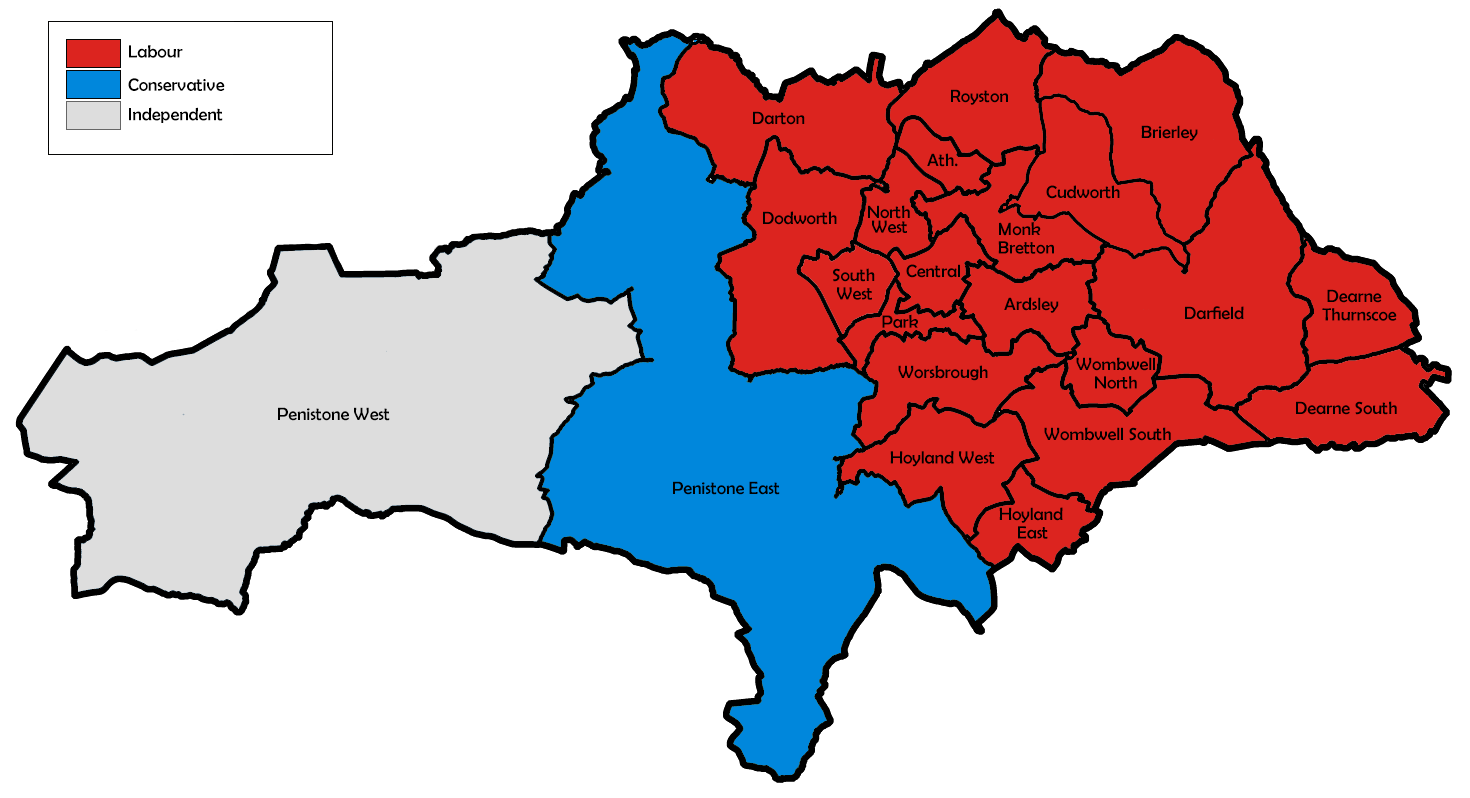
- Map showing the results of the 1991 Barnsley council elections.
Majority party before election
Labour
Majority party after election
Labour

Elections to Barnsley Metropolitan Borough Council were held on 2 May 1991, with one third of the council up for election. Prior to the election, the defending councillor in Penistone West had changed their affiliation from Residents to Independent, ending the Residents presence on the council that had endured since its creation in 1973. The election resulted in Labour retaining control of the council.

== Election result ==
Barnsley Metropolitan Borough Council Election Result 1991
Party	Seats	Gains	Losses	Net gain/loss	Seats %	Votes %	Votes	+/−
Labour	20	0	0	0	90.9	63.9	18,947	-12.5
Conservative	1	0	0	0	4.5	17.6	5,212	+0.6
Independent	1	0	0	0	4.5	10.5	3,104	+8.3
Barnsley Party	0	0	0	0	0.0	4.9	1,451	+4.9
Green	0	0	0	0	0.0	3.1	927	-1.3

This resulted in the following composition of the council:

Party	Previous council	New council
Labour	62	62
Conservatives	2	2
Independent	2	2
Total	66	66
Working majority	58	58

== Ward results ==
+/- figures represent changes from the last time these wards were contested.

Ardsley (7522)
Party	Candidate	Votes	%	±%
Labour	Clowery F.*	Unopposed	N/A	N/A
Labour hold		Swing	N/A	

Athersley (6789)
Party	Candidate	Votes	%	±%
Labour	Langford L.*	Unopposed	N/A	N/A
Labour hold		Swing	N/A	

Brierley (7307)
Party	Candidate	Votes	%	±%
Labour	Whittaker N.	1,618	58.6	−25.9
Independent	Vodden N.	742	26.9	+26.9
Conservative	Schofield D. Ms.	401	14.5	−0.9
Majority		876	31.7	−37.4
Turnout		2,761	37.8	−2.1
Labour hold		Swing	-26.4	

Central (8609)
Party	Candidate	Votes	%	±%
Labour	Fisher R.*	Unopposed	N/A	N/A
Labour hold		Swing	N/A	

Cudworth (8029)
Party	Candidate	Votes	%	±%
Labour	Salt H.*	Unopposed	N/A	N/A
Labour hold		Swing	N/A	

Darfield (8041)
Party	Candidate	Votes	%	±%
Labour	Goddard B.*	2,172	81.7	−5.3
Conservative	Burton J.	485	18.3	+5.3
Majority		1,687	63.5	−10.6
Turnout		2,657	33.0	−5.8
Labour hold		Swing	-5.3	

Darton (9462)
Party	Candidate	Votes	%	±%
Labour	Norbury W.*	2,317	75.7	+8.4
Conservative	Elders E. Ms.	743	24.3	+6.5
Majority		1,574	51.4	+1.9
Turnout		3,060	32.3	−7.3
Labour hold		Swing	+0.9	

Dearne South (8992)
Party	Candidate	Votes	%	±%
Labour	Greenhalgh P. Ms.	Unopposed	N/A	N/A
Labour hold		Swing	N/A	

Dearne Thurnscoe (8368)
Party	Candidate	Votes	%	±%
Labour	Gardiner A.	Unopposed	N/A	N/A
Labour hold		Swing	N/A	

Dodworth (9266)
Party	Candidate	Votes	%	±%
Labour	Cawthrow C.*	2,244	65.2	−2.8
Conservative	Dews R.	634	18.4	+2.3
Green	Jones D.	563	16.4	+0.6
Majority		1,610	46.8	−5.1
Turnout		3,441	37.1	−3.4
Labour hold		Swing	-2.5	

Hoyland East (8042)
Party	Candidate	Votes	%	±%
Labour	Levitt L.*	Unopposed	N/A	N/A
Labour hold		Swing	N/A	

Hoyland West (6853)
Party	Candidate	Votes	%	±%
Labour	Schofield A.*	Unopposed	N/A	N/A
Labour hold		Swing	N/A	

Monk Bretton (9060)
Party	Candidate	Votes	%	±%
Labour	Barron R.*	1,900	71.5	N/A
Barnsley Party	Brown J.	756	28.5	N/A
Majority		1,144	43.1	N/A
Turnout		2,656	29.3	N/A
Labour hold		Swing	N/A	

North West (7500)
Party	Candidate	Votes	%	±%
Labour	Hadfield P.*	1,443	69.7	−6.8
Conservative	Carrington J.	628	30.3	+6.8
Majority		815	39.4	−13.6
Turnout		2,071	27.6	−8.5
Labour hold		Swing	-6.8	

Park (5809)
Party	Candidate	Votes	%	±%
Labour	Murphy G.*	Unopposed	N/A	N/A
Labour hold		Swing	N/A	

Penistone East (7303)
Party	Candidate	Votes	%	±%
Conservative	Wade J.*	1,881	49.3	+10.9
Labour	Headon M.	1,574	41.2	−20.5
Green	Carr L.	364	9.5	+9.5
Majority		307	8.0	−15.3
Turnout		3,819	52.3	+4.5
Conservative hold		Swing	-15.7	

Penistone West (8505)
Party	Candidate	Votes	%	±%
Independent	Harrison M. Ms.*	2,362	65.7	+65.7
Labour	Boaler M.	1,233	34.3	−28.5
Majority		1,129	31.4	+5.7
Turnout		3,595	42.3	+0.1
Independent hold		Swing	+47.1	

Royston (8850)
Party	Candidate	Votes	%	±%
Labour	Lavender H.*	2,164	75.7	+3.7
Barnsley Party	Kwapisz P.	695	24.3	+24.3
Majority		1,469	51.4	+7.4
Turnout		2,859	32.3	−6.0
Labour hold		Swing	-10.3	

South West (7724)
Party	Candidate	Votes	%	±%
Labour	Hall M.*	Unopposed	N/A	N/A
Labour hold		Swing	N/A	

Wombwell North (5303)
Party	Candidate	Votes	%	±%
Labour	Wraith R.*	Unopposed	N/A	N/A
Labour hold		Swing	N/A	

Wombwell South (8316)
Party	Candidate	Votes	%	±%
Labour	Wake J.*	Unopposed	N/A	N/A
Labour hold		Swing	N/A	

Worsbrough (8223)
Party	Candidate	Votes	%	±%
Labour	Wright F.*	2,282	83.8	−2.9
Conservative	Barnard R.	440	16.2	+2.9
Majority		1,842	67.7	−5.7
Turnout		2,722	33.1	−7.5
Labour hold		Swing	-2.9	

== By-elections between 1991 and 1992 ==
Dodworth (9441) 9 April 1992
Party	Candidate	Votes	%	±%
Labour	Lofts, P. A.	4,010	58.1	−7.1
Liberal Democrats	Guest, I.	2,896	41.9	+41.9
Majority		1,114	16.2	−30.6
Turnout		6,906	73.1	+36.0
Labour hold		Swing	-24.5	

Monk Bretton (8949) By-election 9 April 1992
Party	Candidate	Votes	%	±%
Labour	Harper, M. E.	3,627	64.2	−7.3
Barnsley Party	Brown J.	2,021	35.8	+7.3
Majority		1,606	28.4	−14.7
Turnout		5,648	63.1	+33.8
Labour hold		Swing	-7.3	
