= 1990 Barnsley Metropolitan Borough Council election =

1990 local election in England

← 1988	4 May 1990	1991 →

One third of seats (22 of 66) to Barnsley Metropolitan Borough Council 34 seats needed for a majority
	First party	Second party	Third party
Party	Labour	Conservative	Green
Seats won	22	0	0
Seat change	Steady	Steady	Steady
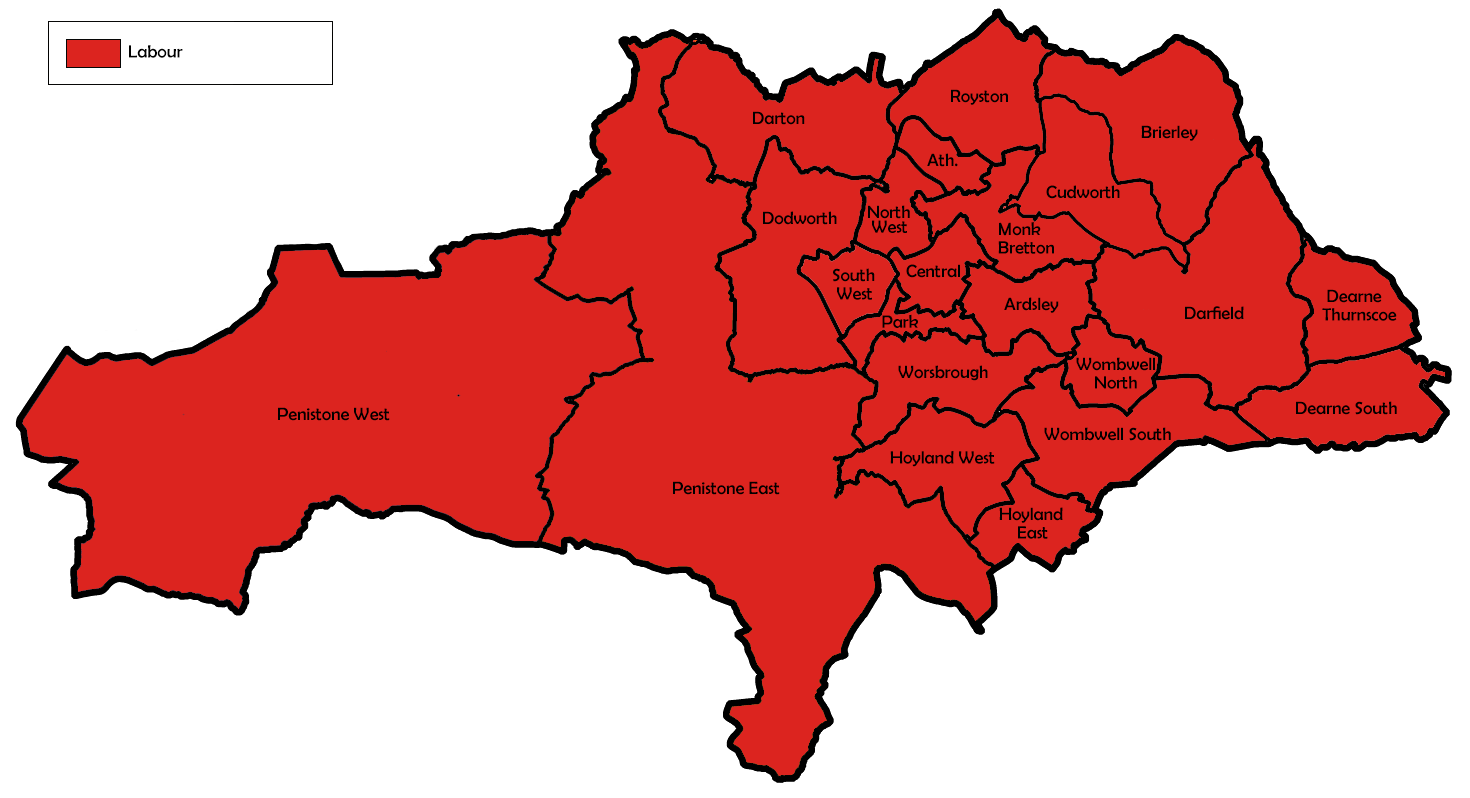
- Map showing the results of the 1990 Barnsley council elections.
Majority party before election
Labour
Majority party after election
Labour

Elections to Barnsley Metropolitan Borough Council were held on 4 May 1990, with one third of the council up for election. The election resulted in Labour retaining control of the council.

== Election result ==
Barnsley Metropolitan Borough Council Election Result 1990
Party	Seats	Gains	Losses	Net gain/loss	Seats %	Votes %	Votes	+/−
Labour	22	0	0	0	100.0	76.4	32,905	+6.4
Conservative	0	0	0	0	0.0	17.0	7,336	-3.9
Green	0	0	0	0	0.0	4.4	1,899	+4.4
Independent	0	0	0	0	0.0	2.2	945	-7.0

This resulted in the following composition of the council:

Party	Previous council	New council
Labour	62	62
Conservatives	2	2
Residents	1	1
Independent	1	1
Total	66	66
Working majority	58	58

== Ward results ==
+/- figures represent changes from the last time these wards were contested.

Ardsley (7614)
Party	Candidate	Votes	%	±%
Labour	Galvin P. Ms.	Unopposed	N/A	N/A
Labour hold		Swing	N/A	

Athersley (6896)
Party	Candidate	Votes	%	±%
Labour	Moore G.*	Unopposed	N/A	N/A
Labour hold		Swing	N/A	

Brierley (7228)
Party	Candidate	Votes	%	±%
Labour	Jeff Ennis*	2,437	84.5	−2.6
Conservative	Schofield D. Ms.	446	15.5	+2.6
Majority		1,991	69.1	−5.2
Turnout		2,883	39.9	+8.5
Labour hold		Swing	-2.6	

Central (8762)
Party	Candidate	Votes	%	±%
Labour	Margaret Wilby	2,482	78.4	N/A
Green	Smith J. Ms.	682	21.6	N/A
Majority		1,800	56.9	N/A
Turnout		3,164	36.1	N/A
Labour hold		Swing	N/A	

Cudworth (8097)
Party	Candidate	Votes	%	±%
Labour	Charlie Wraith*	2,978	91.0	N/A
Conservative	Schofield R.	293	9.0	N/A
Majority		2,685	82.1	N/A
Turnout		3,271	40.4	N/A
Labour hold		Swing	N/A	

Darfield (7927)
Party	Candidate	Votes	%	±%
Labour	Terry Dixon*	2,683	87.0	−1.8
Conservative	Burton J.	400	13.0	+1.8
Majority		2,283	74.1	−3.5
Turnout		3,083	38.9	+10.2
Labour hold		Swing	-1.8	

Darton (9849)
Party	Candidate	Votes	%	±%
Labour	McKenna E.*	2,631	67.3	+7.2
Conservative	Barnard R.	695	17.8	−0.5
Green	Marsh D.	582	14.9	+14.9
Majority		1,936	49.5	+11.1
Turnout		3,908	39.7	+4.8
Labour hold		Swing	+3.8	

Dearne South (8929)
Party	Candidate	Votes	%	±%
Labour	Slasor G.	Unopposed	N/A	N/A
Labour hold		Swing	N/A	

Dearne Thurnscoe (8334)
Party	Candidate	Votes	%	±%
Labour	Catherine Evans*	Unopposed	N/A	N/A
Labour hold		Swing	N/A	

Dodworth (9914)
Party	Candidate	Votes	%	±%
Labour	Coulter J.	2,734	68.0	−10.9
Conservative	Dews R.	649	16.2	−4.9
Green	Jones D.	635	15.8	+15.8
Majority		2,085	51.9	−6.1
Turnout		4,018	40.5	+7.0
Labour hold		Swing	-3.0	

Hoyland East (8023)
Party	Candidate	Votes	%	±%
Labour	Michael Brankin*	2,706	86.1	+0.1
Conservative	Rouse S. Ms.	437	13.9	−0.1
Majority		2,269	72.2	+0.3
Turnout		3,143	39.2	+12.7
Labour hold		Swing	+0.1	

Hoyland West (6913)
Party	Candidate	Votes	%	±%
Labour	Jim Andrews*	Unopposed	N/A	N/A
Labour hold		Swing	N/A	

Monk Bretton (9047)
Party	Candidate	Votes	%	±%
Labour	Roy Robinson*	Unopposed	N/A	N/A
Labour hold		Swing	N/A	

North West (7512)
Party	Candidate	Votes	%	±%
Labour	Cooper G.	2,075	76.5	+4.5
Conservative	Dobbin E. Ms.	637	23.5	−4.5
Majority		1,438	53.0	+9.1
Turnout		2,712	36.1	+6.7
Labour hold		Swing	+4.5	

Park (5758)
Party	Candidate	Votes	%	±%
Labour	Roy Warden*	Unopposed	N/A	N/A
Labour hold		Swing	N/A	

Penistone East (7220)
Party	Candidate	Votes	%	±%
Labour	David Hunter*	2,125	61.7	+10.3
Conservative	Marsden C.	1,323	38.3	−10.3
Majority		806	23.3	+20.5
Turnout		3,452	47.8	−1.2
Labour hold		Swing	+10.3	

Penistone West (8523)
Party	Candidate	Votes	%	±%
Labour	Walker R.*	2,257	62.8	+17.2
Conservative	Leeds K. Ms.	1,335	37.2	−17.2
Majority		922	25.7	+16.9
Turnout		3,592	42.1	+1.4
Labour hold		Swing	+17.2	

Royston (8803)
Party	Candidate	Votes	%	±%
Labour	Ken Rispin*	2,428	72.0	N/A
Independent	Pearson R.	945	28.0	N/A
Majority		1,483	44.0	N/A
Turnout		3,373	38.3	N/A
Labour hold		Swing	N/A	

South West (7853)
Party	Candidate	Votes	%	±%
Labour	Foster D.*	2,455	78.4	+1.4
Conservative	John Dobbin	675	21.6	−1.4
Majority		1,780	56.9	+2.9
Turnout		3,130	39.9	+4.7
Labour hold		Swing	+1.4	

Wombwell North (5280)
Party	Candidate	Votes	%	±%
Labour	Arthur Hall	Unopposed	N/A	N/A
Labour hold		Swing	N/A	

Wombwell South (8344)
Party	Candidate	Votes	%	±%
Labour	Trevor Naylor*	Unopposed	N/A	N/A
Labour hold		Swing	N/A	

Worsbrough (8261)
Party	Candidate	Votes	%	±%
Labour	Terry Bristowe*	2,910	86.7	+1.2
Conservative	Elizabeth Elders	446	13.3	−1.2
Majority		2,464	73.4	+2.4
Turnout		3,356	40.6	+7.8
Labour hold		Swing	+1.2	
