= 2016 Barnsley Metropolitan Borough Council election =

2016 local election in England, UK

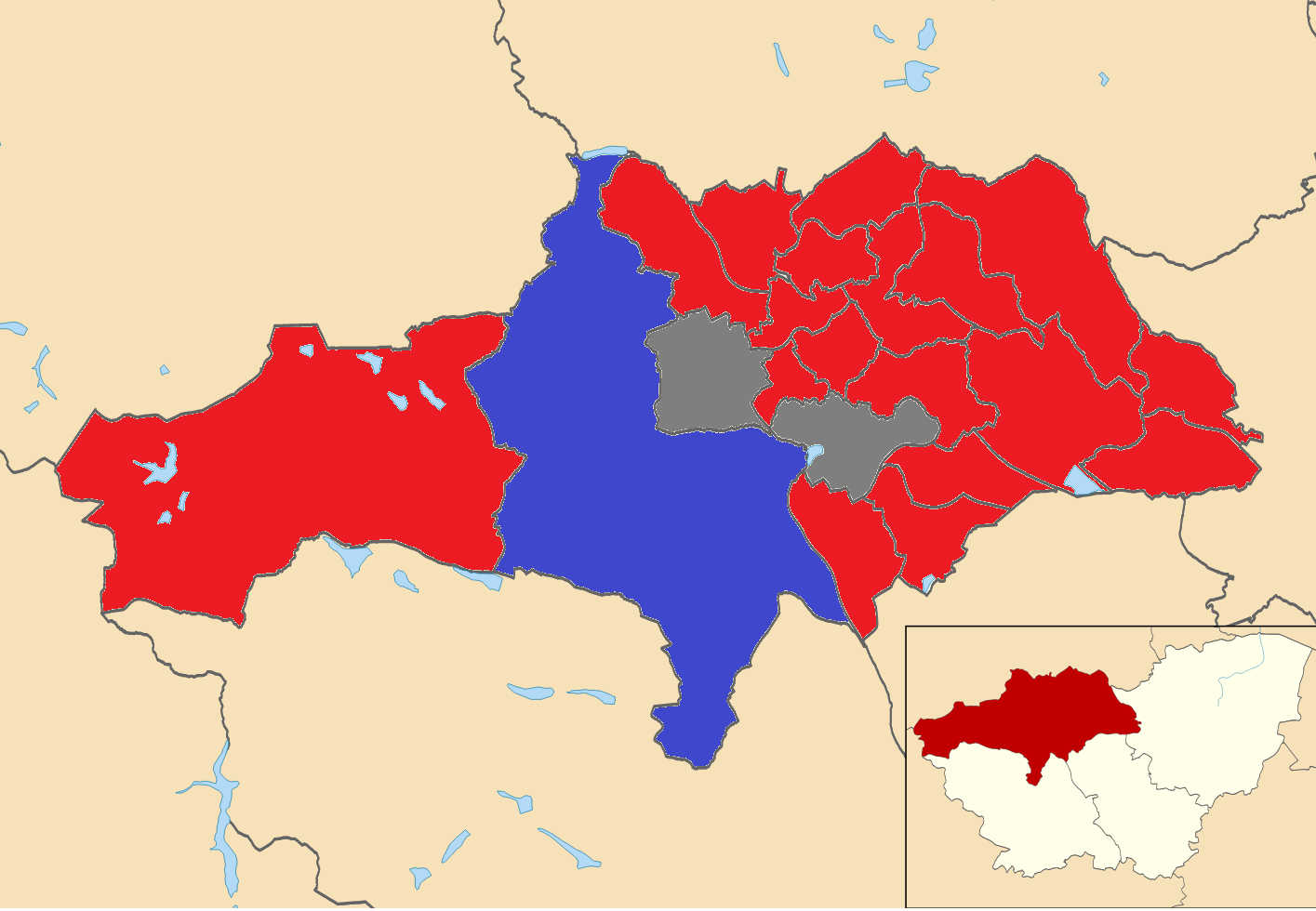

The 2016 Barnsley Metropolitan Borough Council election was held on 5 May 2016 to elect one third of the members of Barnsley Metropolitan Borough Council in England. The election was held on the same day as the election of a Police and Crime Commissioner for South Yorkshire as part of the 2016 Police and Crime Commissioner elections.

== By-elections between 2016 and 2018 ==
Kingstone by-election 29 September 2017
Party	Candidate	Votes	%	±%
Labour	Joanne Murray	740	57.5	−2.4
Liberal Democrats	John Ellis-Mourant	247	19.2	+19.2
Conservative	Lee Ogden	113	8.8	−3.5
Green	Chris Scarfe	87	6.8	−4.1
BNP	Christopher Houston	75	5.8	−5.2
Demos Direct Initiative	Trevor Smith	25	1.9	+1.9
Majority		493	38.3	
Turnout		1,287		
Labour hold		Swing		

Rockingham by-election 14 December 2017
Party	Candidate	Votes	%	±%
Labour	Nicola Sumner	938	66.6	+15.0
Conservative	Michael Toon	272	19.3	+10.9
Liberal Democrats	Paul Nugent	199	14.1	+14.1
Majority		666	47.3	
Turnout		1,409		
Labour hold		Swing		
