= 1988 Barnsley Metropolitan Borough Council election =

1988 English local government election

← 1987	5 May 1988	1990 →

One third of seats (23 of 66) to Barnsley Metropolitan Borough Council 34 seats needed for a majority
	First party	Second party	Third party
Party	Labour	Conservative	Independent
Seats won	21	1	1
Seat change	▲1	Steady	▼1
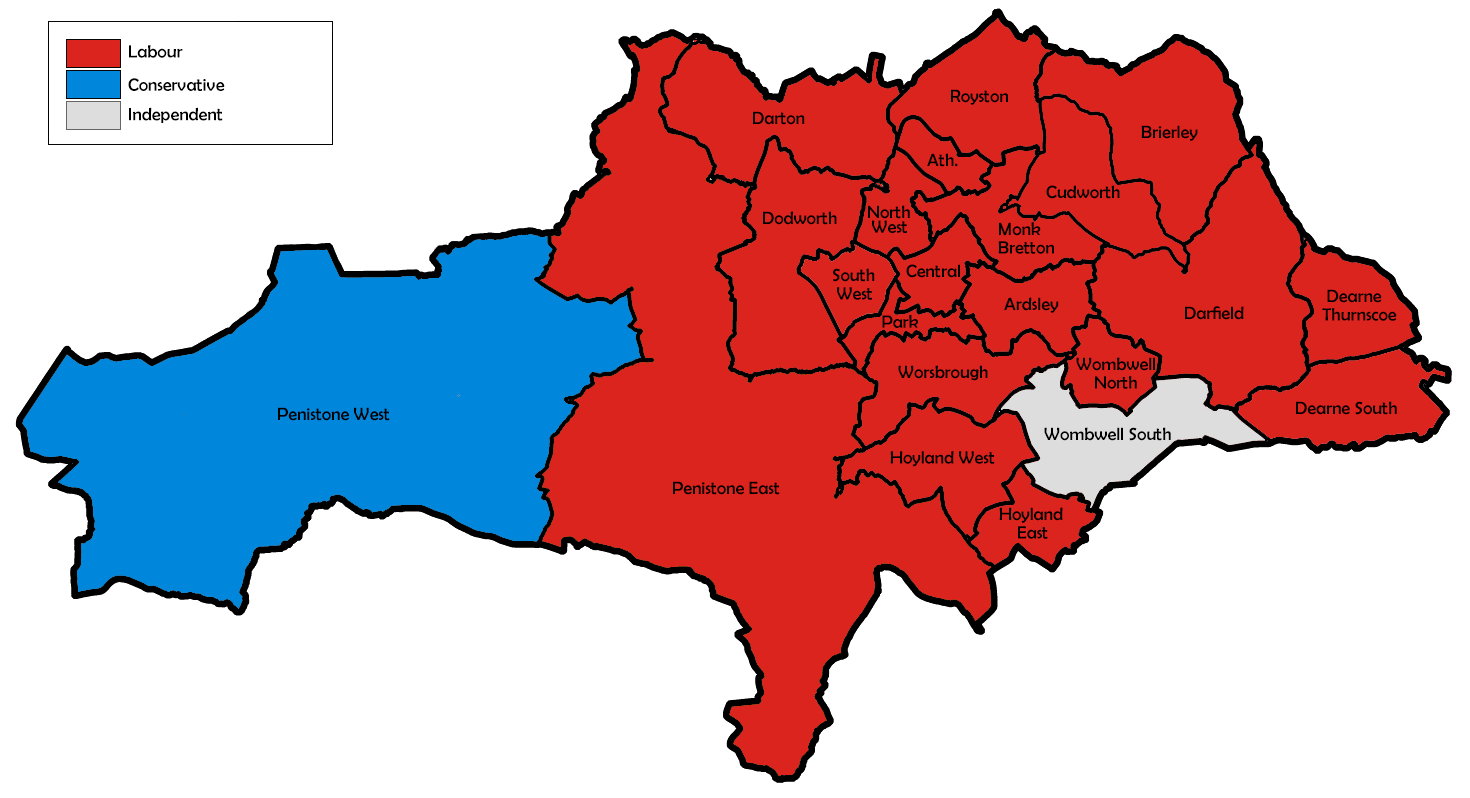
- Map showing the results of the 1988 Barnsley council elections.
Majority party before election
Labour
Majority party after election
Labour

Elections to Barnsley Metropolitan Borough Council were held on 5 May 1988, with one third of the council and an additional vacancy in Dearne Thurnscoe up for election. Prior to the election, the defending councillor in Darton had defected from Labour to Independent. The election resulted in Labour retaining control of the council.

== Election result ==
Barnsley Metropolitan Borough Council Election Result 1988
Party	Seats	Gains	Losses	Net gain/loss	Seats %	Votes %	Votes	+/−
Labour	21	2	1	+1	91.3	70.0	26,117	+6.4
Conservative	1	1	1	0	4.3	20.9	7,798	+8.7
Independent	1	0	1	-1	4.3	9.2	3,414	+3.3

This resulted in the following composition of the council:

Party	Previous council	New council
Labour	61	62
Conservatives	2	2
Residents	1	1
Independent	2	1
Total	66	66
Working majority	56	58

== Ward results ==
+/- figures represent changes from the last time these wards were contested.

Ardsley (7650)
Party	Candidate	Votes	%	±%
Labour	Wilson H.*	1,319	73.2	+12.6
Independent	Parkin A. Ms.	484	26.8	+26.8
Majority		835	46.3	+25.3
Turnout		1,803	23.6	−7.9
Labour hold		Swing	-6.9	

Athersley (6885)
Party	Candidate	Votes	%	±%
Labour	Dancer H.*	Unopposed	N/A	N/A
Labour hold		Swing	N/A	

Brierley (7253)
Party	Candidate	Votes	%	±%
Labour	Whittaker A.	1,984	87.2	+14.0
Conservative	Schofield D. Ms.	292	12.8	+3.1
Majority		1,692	74.3	+13.5
Turnout		2,276	31.4	−9.3
Labour hold		Swing	+5.4	

Central (8672)
Party	Candidate	Votes	%	±%
Labour	Watts J. Ms.*	Unopposed	N/A	N/A
Labour hold		Swing	N/A	

Cudworth (7975)
Party	Candidate	Votes	%	±%
Labour	Rigby R.*	Unopposed	N/A	N/A
Labour hold		Swing	N/A	

Darfield (7956)
Party	Candidate	Votes	%	±%
Labour	Barlow E.*	2,026	88.8	+15.8
Conservative	Schofield R.	255	11.2	−0.7
Majority		1,771	77.6	+19.7
Turnout		2,281	28.7	−10.5
Labour hold		Swing	+8.2	

Darton (9350)
Party	Candidate	Votes	%	±%
Labour	Miller R.	1,960	60.1	−6.2
Independent	Ibbotson A.*	707	21.7	+21.7
Conservative	Barnard R.	595	18.2	+3.5
Majority		1,253	38.4	−9.0
Turnout		3,262	34.9	−5.3
Labour gain from Independent		Swing	-13.9	

Dearne South (8783)
Party	Candidate	Votes	%	±%
Labour	Thomson J.	Unopposed	N/A	N/A
Labour hold		Swing	N/A	

Dearne Thurnscoe (8351)2
Party	Candidate	Votes	%	±%
Labour	Gardiner A.	Unopposed	N/A	N/A
Labour	Young K.*	Unopposed	N/A	N/A
Labour hold		Swing	N/A	
Labour hold		Swing	N/A	

Dodworth (8722)
Party	Candidate	Votes	%	±%
Labour	Ryan J.	2,312	79.0	+13.5
Conservative	Fielding A.	615	21.0	+8.0
Majority		1,697	58.0	+13.9
Turnout		2,927	33.6	−11.7
Labour hold		Swing	+2.7	

Hoyland East (8121)
Party	Candidate	Votes	%	±%
Labour	Beadshall P.*	1,851	86.0	+2.7
Conservative	Romilly S. Ms.	302	14.0	−2.7
Majority		1,549	71.9	+5.3
Turnout		2,153	26.5	−8.2
Labour hold		Swing	+2.7	

Hoyland West (6878)
Party	Candidate	Votes	%	±%
Labour	Wroe C.*	2,088	85.2	+17.1
Conservative	Dews S. Ms.	363	14.8	+14.8
Majority		1,725	70.4	+34.3
Turnout		2,451	35.6	−5.9
Labour hold		Swing	+1.1	

Monk Bretton (9098)
Party	Candidate	Votes	%	±%
Labour	Sheard T.*	Unopposed	N/A	N/A
Labour hold		Swing	N/A	

North West (7553)
Party	Candidate	Votes	%	±%
Labour	Denton W.	1,597	72.0	+5.8
Conservative	Carrington C. Ms.	622	28.0	−5.8
Majority		975	43.9	+11.6
Turnout		2,219	29.4	−3.8
Labour hold		Swing	+5.8	

Park (5882)
Party	Candidate	Votes	%	±%
Labour	Borrett K.*	1,449	86.3	+28.2
Conservative	Dews R.	230	13.7	+5.4
Majority		1,219	72.6	+34.1
Turnout		1,679	28.5	−14.2
Labour hold		Swing	+11.4	

Penistone East (7105)
Party	Candidate	Votes	%	±%
Labour	Smith L. Ms.	1,791	51.4	+12.1
Conservative	Tue G. Ms.*	1,693	48.6	+1.7
Majority		98	2.8	−4.7
Turnout		3,484	49.0	−3.9
Labour gain from Conservative		Swing	+5.2	

Penistone West (8241)
Party	Candidate	Votes	%	±%
Conservative	Hinchcliff A. Ms.	1,825	54.4	+54.4
Labour	Collett N. Ms.	1,530	45.6	+21.8
Majority		295	8.8	−43.5
Turnout		3,355	40.7	−5.3
Conservative gain from Labour		Swing	+16.3	

Royston (8665)
Party	Candidate	Votes	%	±%
Labour	Newman W.*	Unopposed	N/A	N/A
Labour hold		Swing	N/A	

South West (7662)
Party	Candidate	Votes	%	±%
Labour	McCormick R.	2,075	77.0	+16.7
Conservative	Carrington J.	619	23.0	+7.1
Majority		1,456	54.0	+17.4
Turnout		2,694	35.2	−7.6
Labour hold		Swing	+9.6	

Wombwell North (5354)
Party	Candidate	Votes	%	±%
Labour	Storey A.*	Unopposed	N/A	N/A
Labour hold		Swing	N/A	

Wombwell South (8156)
Party	Candidate	Votes	%	±%
Independent	Mahatme S.*	2,223	54.6	+9.8
Labour	Turp G.	1,851	45.4	−9.8
Majority		372	9.1	−1.4
Turnout		4,074	50.0	+2.6
Independent hold		Swing	+9.8	

Worsbrough (8136)
Party	Candidate	Votes	%	±%
Labour	Hadfield G.*	2,284	85.5	+4.1
Conservative	Elders E. Ms.	387	14.5	−4.1
Majority		1,897	71.0	+8.1
Turnout		2,671	32.8	−4.2
Labour hold		Swing	+4.1	

== By-elections between 1988 and 1990 ==
Cudworth (7975) By-election 30 September 1988
Party	Candidate	Votes	%	±%
Labour	Houghton, S. G.	Unopposed	N/A	N/A
Labour hold		Swing	N/A	

Athersley (6854) By-election 27 July 1989
Party	Candidate	Votes	%	±%
Labour	Bostwick, D.	1,572	85.2	N/A
Athersley Democrat	Bailey, R.	272	14.6	N/A
Majority		1,300	70.6	N/A
Turnout		1,844	26.9	N/A
Labour hold		Swing	N/A	
