= 2014 Barnsley Metropolitan Borough Council election =

2014 UK local government election

- 22 May 2014

21 of 63 seats to Barnsley Metropolitan Borough Council 32 seats needed for a majority
	First party	Second party	Third party
Party	Labour	Barnsley Ind.	Conservative
Seats won	53	6	4
Seat change	▲1	Steady	▼1
Popular vote	26,802	4,275	7,686
Percentage	50.6%	8.1%	14.5%
Swing	▼5.9%	▼11.7%	▲3.7%
Council control before election
Labour Party (UK)
Council control after election
Labour Party (UK)

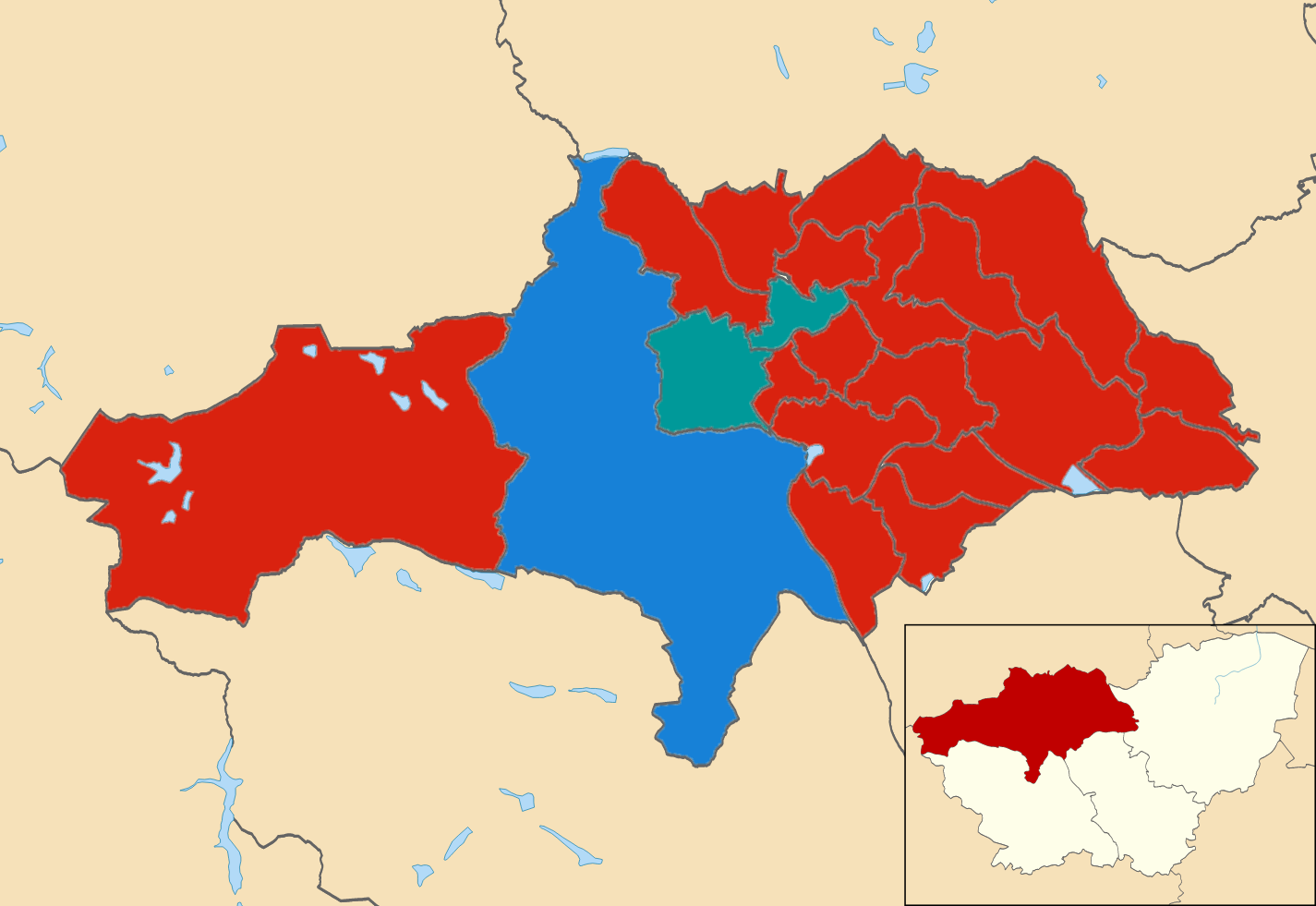
2014 local election results in Barnsley

The 2014 Barnsley Metropolitan Borough Council election took place on 22 May 2014 to elect members of Barnsley Metropolitan Borough Council in England. This was on the same day as other local elections.

== By-elections between 2014 and 2015 ==
Penistone West by-election 10 July 2014
Party	Candidate	Votes	%	±%
Labour	David Griffin	772	31.4	+2.5
Conservative	Andrew Millner	719	29.2	+1.5
UKIP	David Wood	622	25.3	−0.1
Independent	Steve Webber	348	14.1	−4.0
Majority		53	2.15	
Turnout		2,461		
Labour hold		Swing		
