= 2026 Barnsley Metropolitan Borough Council election =

2026 English local government election

- 7 May 2026

All 63 seats to Barnsley Metropolitan Borough Council 32 seats needed for a majority
- Registered: 188,414
- Turnout: 70,182; 37.2% (▲13.1%)

	First party	Second party	Third party
Leader		Stephen Houghton	Hannah Kitching
Party	Reform	Labour	Liberal Democrats
Last election	0 seats, 9.2%	48 seats, 48.9%	11 seats, 16.5%
Seats before	0	46	12
Seats won	42	11	8
Seat change	▲42	▼37	▼3
Popular vote	28,624	22,887	9,046
Percentage	37.5%	30.0%	11.8%
Swing	▲28.3%	▼18.9%	▼4.7%
	Fourth party	Fifth party	Sixth party
Party	Independent	Green	Conservative
Last election	2 seats, 5.3%	0 seats, 4.5%	1 seat, 11.7%
Seats before	4 (Note: Including vacant seat last held by an independent)	0	1
Seats won	2	0	0
Seat change	Steady	Steady	▼1
Popular vote	4,205	6,720	4,302
Percentage	5.5%	8.8%	5.6%
Swing	▲0.2%	▲4.3%	▼6.1%
Leader before election
Stephen Houghton
Labour
Leader after election
William Brown
Reform

The 2026 Barnsley Metropolitan Borough Council election took place on Thursday 7 May 2026, alongside other local elections in the United Kingdom. All 63 members of Barnsley Metropolitan Borough Council in South Yorkshire were elected following boundary changes.

This was the first election on a cycle where all councillors will be elected every four years, after the change was approved by the council in 2025.

Prior to the election, the council was under Labour majority control, as it had been since the council's creation in 1974. At this election, Reform UK, which held no seats on the council prior to the election, won 42 seats, giving them an overall majority. Reform chose William Brown to be its new group leader after the election. He was formally appointed as the new leader of the council at the subsequent annual council meeting on 29 May 2026. Labour's long-standing leader, Stephen Houghton, who had led the council from 1996 until this election, stood down as party leader after the election. Labour chose James Higginbottom to be its new party leader in opposition.

== Background ==
Barnsley was created in 1974 as a metropolitan borough. Labour have always performed well in local elections, holding majority control of the council since its creation. The closest Labour have come to losing their majority on the council was 2006 and 2008, where the success of the Barnsley Independents saw the party reduced to holding just over half the seats. Since 2012, Labour have held over 70% of seats on the council.

The Barnsley Independents formed the principal opposition from 2006 to 2018, when the Conservatives briefly became the second largest party. The Liberal Democrats overtook the Conservatives in 2019 and have formed the principal opposition since.

Prior to this election, Barnsley elected it councillors on a four year cycle, with one councillor elected from each three-member ward in each election. At the most recent election in 2024, 2024, Labour won 17 seats, taking one from the Conservatives, but did not increase their majority due to losing a vacant seat last held by the party to the Liberal Democrats, which won 4 seats. Following boundary changes, the 2026 election will use a new set of ward boundaries.

New ward boundaries for 2026

== Council composition ==
After 2024 election		Before 2026 election	
Party	Seats	Party	Seats
Labour	48	Labour	46
Liberal Democrats	11	Liberal Democrats	12
Conservative	1	Conservative	1
Reform	1	Reform	0
Independent	2	Independent	3
Vacant	N/A	Vacant	1

== Candidates ==
288 candidates were nominated to contest the 63 seats. The Labour Party, Liberal Democrats and Reform UK are each fielding a full slate of 63 candidates. The Conservative Party and Green Party are fielding 42 candidates each. There are 6 independent candidates, 3 English Democrats, 3 SDP and 3 TUSC.

Liberal Democrat Leader of the Opposition, Hannah Kitching, is did not seek re-election. In addition, six other incumbents are did not run again during this election; Alice Cave, Steve Green, Kath Mitchell and Abi Moore of the Labour Party; Steve Hunt of the Liberal Democrats and independent councillor Trevor Smith. Smith had previously been elected as Labour, Democrats and Veterans and Barnsley Independent Group. There was one vacancy at the time of the election, this seat was previously held by independent David White, elected as Conservative, previously Reform UK. All other 55 serving councillors are seeking re-election, with two moving wards.

== Election result ==
Council composition after the 2024 election

Council composition after the 2026 election

2026 Barnsley Metropolitan Borough Council election
Party	Candidates	Seats	Gains	Losses	Net gain/loss	Seats %	Votes %	Votes	+/−
Reform	63	42	42	0	▲42	66.67	42.05	82,864	▲32.85
Labour	63	11	0	37	▼37	17.46	32.36	63,762	▼16.52
Liberal Democrats	63	8	1	4	▼3	12.70	12.31	24,249	▼4.19
Independent	6	2	0	0	Steady	3.17	2.13	4,205	▼3.17
Green	42	0	0	0	Steady	-	6.31	12,440	▲1.81
Conservative	42	0	0	2	▼2	-	4.45	8,764	▼7.25
SDP	3	0	0	0	Steady	-	0.18	361	▼0.72
English Democrats - "Putting England First!"	3	0	0	0	Steady	-	0.10	200	▼0.60
TUSC	3	0	0	0	Steady	-	0.09	185	▼0.41

== Ward results ==
The results for each ward were:

=== Athersley and New Lodge ===
Athersley and New Lodge (3 seats)
Party	Candidate	Votes	%	±%
Reform	Ian Earp	1,181	49.6	
Reform	Jayne Hulme	1,164	48.9	
Reform	Rocky Laybourn	1,122	47.2	
Labour	Dave Leech*	858	36.1	
Labour	Sarah Tattersall*	828	34.8	
Labour	Neil Wright*	733	30.8	
Green	Rebecca Trotman	146	6.1	
Green	Lina Soura	142	6.0	
Conservative	Andrew Allerton	113	4.7	
Liberal Democrats	Sue Wright	101	4.2	
Liberal Democrats	Neil Calvert	96	4.0	
Liberal Democrats	Matthew Nicholson	79	3.3	
Rejected ballots		6	0.3	
Turnout		2,379	28.0	
Registered electors		8,511		
Reform gain from Labour		Swing		
Reform gain from Labour		Swing		
Reform gain from Labour		Swing		

=== Central ===
Central (3 seats)
Party	Candidate	Votes	%	±%
Labour	Nicola Sumner*	1,208	43.1	
Labour	Janine Moyes*	1,137	40.6	
Labour	Martin O'Donoghue*	1,089	38.9	
Reform	Gerald Bateman	1,033	36.9	
Reform	Christopher Mannion	1,023	36.5	
Reform	Patricia Smith	1,012	36.1	
Green	Nick Milne	286	10.2	
Green	Eloise Morris	277	9.9	
Liberal Democrats	Sam Bullcock	264	9.4	
Green	Davinder Pinder	238	8.5	
Liberal Democrats	Andrew Micklethwaite	221	7.9	
Liberal Democrats	Pietro Politano	219	7.8	
Conservative	Elaine Weems	104	3.7	
Rejected ballots		6	0.2	
Turnout		2,801	33.3	
Registered electors		8,410		
Labour hold		Swing		
Labour hold		Swing		
Labour hold		Swing		

=== Cudworth ===
Cudworth (3 seats)
Party	Candidate	Votes	%	±%
Labour	Steve Houghton*	1,306	44.1	
Labour	Joe Hayward*	1,303	44.0	
Reform	Stanley Bryan	1,283	43.3	
Reform	Diane Bryan	1,268	42.8	
Labour	Anita Cherryholme*	1,229	41.5	
Reform	Richard Szenk	1,119	37.8	
Green	Richard Knights	238	8.0	
Green	Dale Jackson	190	6.4	
Liberal Democrats	Elizabeth Foers	107	3.6	
Conservative	Peter Forbes	106	3.6	
Conservative	Gary Marsh	85	2.9	
Liberal Democrats	Thomas Wright	83	2.8	
Liberal Democrats	Glenn Lawrence	72	2.4	
Rejected ballots		13	0.4	
Turnout		2,960	35.6	
Registered electors		8,322		
Labour hold		Swing		
Labour hold		Swing		
Reform gain from Labour		Swing		

=== Darfield and Great Houghton ===
Darfield and Great Houghton (3 seats)
Party	Candidate	Votes	%	±%
Reform	David Goddard	1,674	48.0	
Reform	Gary Hall	1,621	46.4	
Reform	Scott McKenzie	1,573	45.1	
Labour	Kevin Osborne*	1,269	36.4	
Labour	Pauline Markham*	1,268	36.3	
Labour	Richard Ullyott	1,085	31.1	
Green	Ehren Holt	323	9.3	
Conservative	Paul Hand-Davis	203	5.8	
Conservative	John Norton	189	5.4	
Liberal Democrats	Simon Hulme	180	5.2	
Liberal Democrats	Alison Palmer	180	5.2	
Liberal Democrats	Gregory Needham	157	4.5	
Rejected ballots		11	0.3	
Turnout		3,490	37.7	
Registered electors		9,247		
Reform gain from Labour		Swing		
Reform gain from Labour		Swing		
Reform gain from Labour		Swing		

=== Darton East ===
Darton East (3 seats)
Party	Candidate	Votes	%	±%
Liberal Democrats	Dickie Denton*	1,724	45.3	
Liberal Democrats	Leyla Nayeri*	1,529	40.2	
Liberal Democrats	Carl Snowden	1,472	38.7	
Reform	Kirsty Bogic	1,141	30.0	
Reform	Nina Musgrave	1,127	29.6	
Reform	Eunice Asante	1,082	28.4	
Labour	Teresa Wilcockson	851	22.4	
Labour	Stephen Morgan	685	18.0	
Labour	Wayne Martindale	586	15.4	
Green	Tom Heyes	270	7.1	
Green	Phil Atkinson	217	5.7	
Conservative	Roger Haw	100	2.6	
Conservative	Phil Weems	99	2.6	
Rejected ballots		11	0.3	
Turnout		3,804	42.2	
Registered electors		9,010		
Liberal Democrats hold		Swing		
Liberal Democrats hold		Swing		
Liberal Democrats hold		Swing		

=== Darton West ===
Darton West (3 seats)
Party	Candidate	Votes	%	±%
Reform	Sam Burdett	1,607	41.3	
Reform	Andy Cudworth	1,544	39.7	
Reform	Luca Turner	1,510	38.8	
Labour	Trevor Cave*	1,504	38.7	
Labour	Sharon Howard*	1,460	37.6	
Labour	Simon Williamson	1,319	33.9	
Green	Trevor Mayne	456	11.7	
Green	Kabir Nepal	453	11.7	
Green	Sophie Parkinson	420	10.8	
Conservative	David Rodger	232	6.0	
Liberal Democrats	Kevin Bennett	202	5.2	
Conservative	Mike Toon	187	4.8	
Liberal Democrats	Jo Mathewson	183	4.7	
Liberal Democrats	Patrick Smith	157	4.0	
Rejected ballots		7	0.2	
Turnout		3,888	43.6	
Registered electors		8,924		
Reform gain from Labour		Swing		
Reform gain from Labour		Swing		
Reform gain from Labour		Swing		

=== Dearne North ===
Dearne North (3 seats)
Party	Candidate	Votes	%	±%
Reform	Luke Wheat	1,157	48.0	
Reform	Brian Kilner	1,146	47.5	
Reform	Neil Young	1,141	47.3	
Labour	Sue Bellamy*	771	32.0	
Labour	Wendy Cain*	748	31.0	
Labour	Martin Morrell*	634	26.3	
Green	Ian Berry	276	11.4	
Liberal Democrats	Brian Evans	129	5.4	
Conservative	Francis McCane	112	4.6	
Liberal Democrats	Rhiannon Rees	112	4.6	
Liberal Democrats	Hayden Prescott	108	4.5	
Conservative	Helen Smith	97	4.0	
English Democrat	Maxine Spencer	81	3.4	
English Democrat	Gary Knight	57	2.4	
English Democrat	Janus Polenceusz	62	2.6	
Rejected ballots		7	0.3	
Turnout		2,411	26.7	
Registered electors		9,022		
Reform gain from Labour		Swing		
Reform gain from Labour		Swing		
Reform gain from Labour		Swing		

=== Dearne South ===
Dearne South (3 seats)
Party	Candidate	Votes	%	±%
Reform	Mark Langridge	1,489	54.7	
Reform	Christopher Charlton	1,330	48.9	
Reform	Kay Kilner	1,301	47.8	
Labour	Janine Bowler*	937	34.4	
Labour	John Cooper	918	33.7	
Labour	Deborah Pearson*	798	29.3	
Green	Matthew Jackson	233	8.6	
Liberal Democrats	Linda Fielding	115	4.2	
SDP	David Jarvis	111	4.1	
Liberal Democrats	Jonathan Cutts	105	3.9	
Conservative	Keith Geal	93	3.4	
Liberal Democrats	Mandy Lowe-Flello**	90	3.3	
SDP	Warwick Bettney	70	2.6	
Conservative	Rosemary Jackson	68	2.5	
Rejected ballots		4	0.1	
Turnout		2,722	28.9	
Registered electors		9,422		
Reform gain from Labour		Swing		
Reform gain from Labour		Swing		
Reform gain from Labour		Swing		

Mandy Lowe-Flello was an incumbent councillor for Penistone West.

=== Dodworth, Stainborough and Tankersley ===
Dodworth, Stainborough and Tankersley (3 seats)
Party	Candidate	Votes	%	±%
Reform	Betty Barnes	1,354	39.3	
Reform	Melvyn Bird	1,301	37.8	
Reform	Michael Naughton	1,284	37.3	
Liberal Democrats	Chris Wray*	1,222	35.5	
Liberal Democrats	Andy Waters*	1,109	32.2	
Liberal Democrats	Janet Wray	1,051	30.5	
Labour	Thomas Beech	540	15.7	
Labour	Chris Newton	525	15.3	
Labour	Rachael Yardley	487	14.1	
Green	Becky Thompson	213	6.2	
Green	Lee Long	199	5.8	
Conservative	Debbie Toon	190	5.5	
Green	Roland Powell	188	5.5	
Conservative	Lee Ogden	185	5.4	
Conservative	John Wilson	171	5.0	
Rejected ballots		5	0.1	
Turnout		3,442	45.4	
Registered electors		7,583		
Reform gain from Liberal Democrats		Swing		
Reform gain from Liberal Democrats		Swing		
Reform gain from Liberal Democrats		Swing		

=== Hoyland Milton ===
Hoyland Milton (3 seats)
Party	Candidate	Votes	%	±%
Reform	Brian Gregory	1,746	46.9	
Reform	Michael Davies	1,725	46.3	
Reform	Rachael Kay	1,629	43.7	
Labour	Robin Franklin*	1,310	35.2	
Labour	Tim Shepherd*	1,296	34.8	
Labour	Mick Stowe*	1,172	31.5	
Green	Charlie Evans	455	12.2	
Liberal Democrats	Barnaby Churchill	201	5.4	
Liberal Democrats	Gina Rayner	185	5.0	
Conservative	Peter Murray	169	4.5	
Conservative	Gareth Parkin	155	4.2	
Liberal Democrats	Claire Redmond	154	4.1	
TUSC	Angela Waller	115	3.1	
Rejected ballots		6	0.2	
Turnout		3,724	38.0	
Registered electors		9,789		
Reform gain from Labour		Swing		
Reform gain from Labour		Swing		
Reform gain from Labour		Swing		

=== Kingstone ===
Kingstone (3 seats)
Party	Candidate	Votes	%	±%
Liberal Democrats	Steve Bullcock*	1,317	40.0	
Liberal Democrats	Philip Wright*	1,128	34.3	
Liberal Democrats	Ian Guest	1,094	33.3	
Reform	Granville Corker	946	28.8	
Reform	Sharon Gillis	890	27.1	
Reform	David Miller	880	26.7	
Labour	Nieve Elliott	755	22.9	
Labour	Amy Holling	691	21.0	
Labour	Deniss Kurnovs	574	17.4	
Green	Peter Giles	302	9.2	
Green	Clare Winder	292	8.9	
Green	Laur Tupling	257	7.8	
Conservative	Andrew Millner	140	4.3	
Conservative	Garry Needham	108	3.3	
TUSC	Tracey-Ann Holland	29	0.9	
Rejected ballots		5	0.2	
Turnout		3,290	37.6	
Registered electors		8,757		
Liberal Democrats hold		Swing		
Liberal Democrats hold		Swing		
Liberal Democrats gain from Labour		Swing		

=== Monk Bretton ===
Monk Bretton (3 seats)
Party	Candidate	Votes	%	±%
Reform	Paul Kelly	1,543	46.4	
Reform	Kate Milner	1,495	44.9	
Reform	Alan Parker	1,474	44.3	
Labour	Amy Brookes	1,026	30.8	
Labour	Kenneth Richardson*	1,023	30.7	
Labour	Margaret Sheard*	1,023	30.7	
Independent	Rachel Stewart	437	13.1	
Green	Brigid Baker	305	9.2	
Green	Jessica Green	272	8.2	
Conservative	Thomas Collings	172	5.2	
Liberal Democrats	Peter Fielding	146	4.4	
Liberal Democrats	Elaine Micklethwaite	135	4.1	
Conservative	Kevin Orrell	132	4.0	
Liberal Democrats	Sue Rose	116	3.5	
Rejected ballots		2	0.1	
Turnout		3,329	35.1	
Registered electors		9,485		
Reform gain from Labour		Swing		
Reform gain from Labour		Swing		
Reform gain from Labour		Swing		

=== North East ===
North East (3 seats)
Party	Candidate	Votes	%	±%
Reform	Martin Bancroft	1,243	47.4	
Reform	William Brown	1,212	46.2	
Reform	John Sidebottom	1,158	44.1	
Labour	Ashley Peace*	927	35.3	
Labour	Ruth Booker*	909	34.6	
Labour	Dorothy Coates*	834	31.8	
Independent	Raymond Archer	266	10.1	
Green	Jane Sellars	167	6.4	
Green	Sophie Steele	166	6.3	
Green	Alison White	135	5.1	
Conservative	James Clay	114	4.3	
Conservative	Ann Shelbourne	96	3.7	
Liberal Democrats	Alex Mathewson	72	2.7	
Liberal Democrats	Alexis Fielding-Webb	71	2.7	
Liberal Democrats	Geoff Reid	57	2.2	
Rejected ballots		7	0.3	
Turnout		2,624	30.6	
Registered electors		8,563		
Reform gain from Labour		Swing		
Reform gain from Labour		Swing		
Reform gain from Labour		Swing		

=== Old Town ===
Old Town (3 seats)
Party	Candidate	Votes	%	±%
Labour	Phil Lofts*	1,391	39.5	
Labour	Jo Newing*	1,382	39.2	
Labour	Brandon Green	1,352	38.4	
Reform	David Cunningham	1,202	34.1	
Reform	Simon Nettleton	1,163	33.0	
Reform	Ian Westwood	1,153	32.7	
Liberal Democrats	Clive Pickering*	483	13.7	
Liberal Democrats	Eloise Bailey	477	13.5	
Liberal Democrats	Will Fielding**	386	11.0	
Green	Ken Baker	313	8.9	
Green	Gillian Nixon	307	8.7	
Green	Ken Smith	213	6.0	
Conservative	Michael Barraclough	189	5.4	
TUSC	Steve Dangerfield	41	1.2	
Rejected ballots		6	0.2	
Turnout		3,523	40.7	
Registered electors		8,654		
Labour hold		Swing		
Labour hold		Swing		
Labour hold		Swing		

Will Fielding was an incumbent councillor for Dodworth.

=== Penistone East ===
Penistone East (3 seats)
Party	Candidate	Votes	%	±%
Labour	Alex Burnett*	2,040	41.8	
Reform	Kay Hughes	1,669	34.2	
Labour	Frances Nixon	1,645	33.7	
Labour	John Roberts*	1,632	33.5	
Reform	Peter Millar	1,604	32.9	
Reform	James Perigo	1,529	31.3	
Conservative	Robert Barnard*	1,050	21.5	
Conservative	Steven Burkinshaw	843	17.3	
Conservative	Tom Lindley	703	14.4	
Green	Kate Raynor	402	8.2	
Green	Freya Nepal	346	7.1	
Liberal Democrats	Catherine Rogerson	312	6.4	
Liberal Democrats	Matthew Summers	189	3.9	
Liberal Democrats	Adam Wiszniewski	115	2.4	
Rejected ballots		9	0.2	
Turnout		4,878	56.3	
Registered electors		8,662		
Labour hold		Swing		
Reform gain from Conservative		Swing		
Labour hold		Swing		

=== Penistone West ===
Penistone West (3 seats)
Party	Candidate	Votes	%	±%
Liberal Democrats	David Greenhough*	1,680	35.2	
Liberal Democrats	Florentine Bootha-King	1,562	32.8	
Reform	Vicky Jackson	1,399	29.3	
Reform	Kirk Harper	1,398	29.3	
Liberal Democrats	Sue Waters	1,396	29.3	
Reform	Sam Jones	1,365	28.6	
Labour	Sue Cutting	821	17.2	
Green	Willow Raynor	668	14.0	
Labour	Paul Sammon	637	13.4	
Labour	Bryan Worth	602	12.6	
Green	Richard Trotman	556	11.7	
Conservative	Lawrence Maitland	393	8.2	
Conservative	Ian White	352	7.4	
Conservative	Samuel Wilkinson	321	6.7	
Independent	David Wood	276	5.8	
SDP	Rori Cook	180	3.8	
Rejected ballots		28	0.6	
Turnout		4,767	48.7	
Registered electors		9,790		
Liberal Democrats hold		Swing		
Liberal Democrats hold		Swing		
Reform gain from Liberal Democrats		Swing		

=== Rockingham ===
Rockingham (3 seats)
Party	Candidate	Votes	%	±%
Reform	Pat Gregory	1,462	44.0	
Independent	Andy Wray*	1,377	41.5	
Reform	Christopher Denton	1,291	38.9	
Reform	Adam Harrington	1,152	34.7	
Labour	Sherry Holling*	784	23.6	
Labour	Edana Guest	667	20.1	
Labour	Michelle Klepper	638	19.2	
Green	Lucy Benoit	407	12.3	
Green	Amelia Rushworth	263	7.9	
Conservative	Gill Millner	176	5.3	
Conservative	Clive Watkinson	159	4.8	
Liberal Democrats	Sam Calvert	133	4.0	
Liberal Democrats	Anita Kimberley	113	3.4	
Liberal Democrats	Ian Hague-Brown	100	3.0	
Rejected ballots		8	0.2	
Turnout		3,320	39.5	
Registered electors		8,406		
Reform gain from Labour		Swing		
Independent hold		Swing		
Reform gain from Conservative		Swing		

=== Royston ===
Royston (3 seats)
Party	Candidate	Votes	%	±%
Reform	Terry Durkin	1,246	43.6	
Reform	Nick Everest	1,226	42.9	
Reform	Stefan McCrum	1,151	40.3	
Labour	Caroline Makinson*	1,105	38.7	
Labour	Pauline McCarthy*	969	33.9	
Labour	Lewis Cusworth	922	32.3	
Green	Angela Pollard	291	10.2	
Independent	Neil Fisher	254	8.9	
Conservative	Michael Close	155	5.4	
Liberal Democrats	Tina Adkin	152	5.3	
Conservative	George Hill	133	4.7	
Liberal Democrats	Jonathan Hood	111	3.9	
Liberal Democrats	Jon Palmer	106	3.7	
Rejected ballots		7	0.2	
Turnout		2,855	34.4	
Registered electors		8,311		
Reform gain from Labour		Swing		
Reform gain from Labour		Swing		
Reform gain from Labour		Swing		

=== Stairfoot ===
Stairfoot (3 seats)
Party	Candidate	Votes	%	±%
Reform	Edward Dillingham	1,322	46.5	
Reform	Andrew Gillis	1,318	46.4	
Reform	Liam Hardcastle	1,314	46.2	
Labour	Karen Dyson*	942	33.1	
Labour	Ian Shirt*	844	29.7	
Labour	Paul Murray*	835	29.4	
Green	Pete Wall	275	9.7	
Green	Nell Stockton	263	9.3	
Liberal Democrats	Louise Cassidy	185	6.5	
Conservative	Marie Bates	175	6.2	
Liberal Democrats	James Kitching	145	5.1	
Conservative	Charlotte Wilkinson	134	4.7	
Liberal Democrats	Lee Ross	99	3.5	
Rejected ballots		3	0.1	
Turnout		2,842	31.1	
Registered electors		9,145		
Reform gain from Labour		Swing		
Reform gain from Labour		Swing		
Reform gain from Labour		Swing		

=== Wombwell ===
Wombwell (3 seats)
Party	Candidate	Votes	%	±%
Reform	Andy Arnold	1,535	44.6	
Labour	James Higginbottom*	1,514	44.0	
Reform	Theresa Arnold	1,448	42.1	
Labour	Brenda Eastwood*	1,425	41.4	
Reform	Deborah Hirst	1,376	40.0	
Labour	Robert Frost*	1,347	39.2	
Green	Jessica Roebuck	361	10.5	
Conservative	Mark Brook	153	4.4	
Conservative	Tracy Skinner	134	3.9	
Liberal Democrats	Robert W Green	122	3.5	
Liberal Democrats	Josh Foers	115	3.3	
Liberal Democrats	Suzanne Gill	90	2.6	
Rejected ballots		8	0.2	
Turnout		3,440	32.7	
Registered electors		10,505		
Reform gain from Labour		Swing		
Labour hold		Swing		
Reform gain from Labour		Swing		

=== Worsbrough ===
Worsbrough (3 seats)
Party	Candidate	Votes	%	±%
Independent	Jake Lodge*	1,595	43.2	
Reform	Gill Carr	1,392	37.7	
Reform	Mike Lycett	1,377	37.3	
Reform	Simon Moore	1,244	33.7	
Labour	Roy Bowser*	1,028	27.8	
Labour	John Clarke*	1,015	27.5	
Labour	David Webster**	609	16.5	
Green	Amy Walker	333	9.0	
Green	Rachel Lloyd	326	8.8	
Liberal Democrats	Sarah Calvert	199	5.4	
Conservative	Jonathan Bennett	163	4.4	
Liberal Democrats	Joshua Green	126	3.4	
Conservative	Adrian Thompson	111	3.0	
Liberal Democrats	Alex Wright	110	3.0	
Rejected ballots		2	0.1	
Turnout		3,693	37.3	
Registered electors		9,896		
Independent hold		Swing		
Reform gain from Labour		Swing		
Reform gain from Labour		Swing		

David Webster was an incumbent councillor for Royston.

== Changes 2026–2027 ==
=== By-elections ===
==== Penistone East ====
The Penistone East by-election was triggered by the resignation of Reform UK councillor Kay Hughes for personal reasons, around two months after her election.

Penistone East by-election: 20 August 2026
Party	Candidate	Votes	%	±%
Labour	John Roberts	1,728	51.6	+14.4
Reform	Eunice Asante	795	23.8	−6.7
Conservative	Steven Burkinshaw	387	11.6	−7.6
Restore	David Wood	218	6.5	N/A
Independent	Peter Millar	87	2.6	N/A
Liberal Democrats	Andy Waters	70	2.1	−3.6
Green	Ehren Holt	59	1.8	−5.5
Independent	Carlo Turner	2	0.1	N/A
Majority		933	27.9	N/A
Turnout		3,346	38.6	−17.7
Rejected ballots		7	0.2	
Registered electors		8,674		
Labour gain from Reform		Swing	▲10.6	
