= 2024 Barnsley Metropolitan Borough Council election =

Local election in Barnsley, England

- 2 May 2024

21 of 63 seats on Barnsley Metropolitan Borough Council 32 seats needed for a majority
- Turnout: 24.1%

| | Majority party | Minority party | Third party |
|---|---|---|---|
| Leader | Stephen Houghton | Hannah Kitching |
| Party | Labour | Liberal Democrats | Independent |
| Last election | 48 seats, 46.1% | 10 seats, 17.5% | 2 seats, 10.7% |
| Seats before | 47 | 9 | 2 |
| Seats won | 17 | 4 | 0 |
| Seats after | 48 | 11 | 2 |
| Seat change | Steady | ▲1 | Steady |
| Popular vote | 21,995 | 7,420 | 2,398 |
| Percentage | 48.9% | 16.5% | 5.3% |
| Swing | ▲2.8% | ▼1.0% | ▼5.4% |
| | Fourth party | Fifth party |
| Leader | John Wilson | David White |
| Party | Conservative | Reform |
| Last election | 2 seat, 14.2% | 1 seat, 2.9% |
| Seats before | 2 | 1 |
| Seats won | 0 | 0 |
| Seats after | 1 | 1 |
| Seat change | ▼1 | Steady |
| Popular vote | 5,274 | 4,156 |
| Percentage | 11.7% | 9.2% |
| Swing | ▼2.5% | ▲6.3% |
- Winner of each seat at the 2024 Barnsley Metropolitan Borough Council election
Leader before election
Stephen Houghton
Labour
Leader after election
Stephen Houghton
Labour

The 2024 Barnsley Metropolitan Borough Council election was held on 2 May 2024, alongside the other local elections across the United Kingdom being held on the same day. Labour retained its majority on the council.

== Background ==
Result of the council election when these seats were last contested in 2021

Result of the most recent council election in 2023

The Local Government Act 1972 created a two-tier system of metropolitan counties and districts covering Greater Manchester, Merseyside, South Yorkshire, Tyne and Wear, the West Midlands, and West Yorkshire starting in 1974. Barnsley was a district of the South Yorkshire metropolitan county. The Local Government Act 1985 abolished the metropolitan counties, with metropolitan districts taking on most of their powers as metropolitan boroughs. The South Yorkshire Combined Authority was established in 2014 as the Sheffield City Region Combined Authority, which began electing the mayor of South Yorkshire in 2018.

Since its formation, Barnsley has continuously been under Labour control. Councillors have predominantly been elected from the Labour Party, various independents, the Conservative Party and the Liberal Democrats. The council elected a large number of Barnsley Independent Group councillors in the 2006 election, whose numbers had fallen in subsequent elections until its dissolution as a party in 2023. Councillors who will be seeking re-election were most recently elected in the 2021 election, which was originally scheduled to be held in 2020 but was delayed due to the COVID-19 pandemic. During that election, seventeen Labour councillors were elected with 40.4% of the vote across the borough, with three Liberal Democrats on 11.8% of the vote across the borough and one Conservative with 25.1% of the vote across the borough. Labour held the Rockingham ward after a coin toss broke a tie between the Labour candidate and the Conservative candidate. In the most recent election in 2023, Labour won 15 seats, the Liberal Democrats won 4 seats and independents won 2 seats. After that election, the council had 48 Labour councillors, ten Liberal Democrats, two Conservatives, two independents, and one Reform UK councillor.

== Electoral process ==
The council elects its councillors in thirds, with a third being up for election every year for three years, with no election in the fourth year. The election will take place by first-past-the-post voting, with wards generally being represented by three councillors, with one elected in each election year to serve a four-year term.

All registered electors (British, Irish, Commonwealth and European Union citizens) living in Barnsley aged 18 or over will be entitled to vote in the election. People who live at two addresses in different councils, such as university students with different term-time and holiday addresses, are entitled to be registered for and vote in elections in both local authorities. Voting in-person at polling stations will take place from 07:00 to 22:00 on election day, and voters will be able to apply for postal votes or proxy votes in advance of the election.

== Previous council composition ==
Council composition after the 2023 election

Council composition ahead of the 2024 election

Council composition following the 2024 election

| After 2023 election | | Before 2024 election | | After 2024 election | |
| Party | Seats | Party | Seats | Party | Seats |
|---|---|---|---|---|---|
| Labour | 48 | Labour | 47 | Labour | 48 |
| Liberal Democrats | 10 | Liberal Democrats | 9 | Liberal Democrats | 11 |
| Conservative | 2 | Conservative | 2 | Conservative | 1 |
| Independent | 2 | Independent | 2 | Independent | 2 |
| Reform | 1 | Reform | 1 | Reform | 1 |
| | | Vacant | 2 | | |

== Results ==
Labour retained its majority on the council at this election.

2024 Barnsley Metropolitan Borough Council election
| Party | This election | | | Full council | | | This election | | |
| Party | Seats | Net | Seats % | Other | Total | Total % | Votes | Votes % | +/− |
|---|---|---|---|---|---|---|---|---|---|
| Labour | 17 | Steady | 81.0 | 31 | 48 | 76.2 | 21,995 | 48.9 | +2.8 |
| Liberal Democrats | 4 | ▲1 | 19.0 | 7 | 11 | 17.5 | 7,420 | 16.5 | –1.0 |
| Independent | 0 | Steady | 0.0 | 0 | 2 | 3.2 | 2,398 | 5.3 | –5.4 |
| Conservative | 0 | ▼1 | 0.0 | 1 | 1 | 1.6 | 5,274 | 11.7 | –2.5 |
| Reform | 0 | Steady | 0.0 | 1 | 1 | 1.6 | 4,156 | 9.2 | +6.3 |
| Green | 0 | Steady | 0.0 | 0 | 0 | 0.0 | 2,035 | 4.5 | –0.1 |
| SDP | 0 | Steady | 0.0 | 0 | 0 | 0.0 | 396 | 0.9 | –0.1 |
| English Democrat | 0 | Steady | 0.0 | 0 | 0 | 0.0 | 313 | 0.7 | N/A |
| Yorkshire | 0 | Steady | 0.0 | 0 | 0 | 0.0 | 272 | 0.6 | –1.4 |
| TUSC | 0 | Steady | 0.0 | 0 | 0 | 0.0 | 234 | 0.5 | ±0.0 |

== Ward results ==
The results for each ward were:

=== Central ===
Central
| Party | Candidate | Votes | % | ±% |
|---|---|---|---|---|
| Labour | Nicola Sumner | 1,012 | 58.2 | ▲9.3 |
| Green | Christopher Michael Scarfe | 291 | 16.7 | ▼1.9 |
| Conservative | Adrian Thompson | 250 | 14.4 | ▼12.4 |
| Liberal Democrats | Catherine Teresa Rogerson | 185 | 10.6 | ▲4.9 |
| Majority | | 721 | 41.5 | 19.3 |
| Rejected ballots | | 25 | 1.4 | |
| Turnout | | 1763 | 20.0 | −0.8 |
| Registered electors | | 8,825 | | |
| Labour hold | | Swing | ▲3.7 | |

=== Cudworth ===
Cudworth
| Party | Candidate | Votes | % | ±% |
|---|---|---|---|---|
| Labour | Steve Houghton | 1,150 | 72.9 | ▲6.0 |
| Conservative | Mark J Brook | 184 | 11.7 | ▼3.8 |
| Liberal Democrats | Elizabeth Kate Waters | 138 | 8.7 | ▲5.0 |
| Green | Kabir Nepal | 106 | 6.7 | N/A |
| Majority | | 966 | 61.2 | |
| Rejected ballots | | 20 | 1.3 | |
| Turnout | | 1598 | 18.7 | |
| Registered electors | | 8,531 | | |
| Labour hold | | Swing | ▲1.1 | |

=== Darfield ===
Darfield
| Party | Candidate | Votes | % | ±% |
|---|---|---|---|---|
| Labour | Kevin John Howard Osborne | 1,012 | 54.0 | ▲4.0 |
| Reform | Scott Andrew McKenzie | 564 | 30.1 | N/A |
| Conservative | Ian White | 171 | 9.1 | ▼16.6 |
| Liberal Democrats | Simon Richard Hulme | 127 | 6.8 | ▲3.5 |
| Majority | | 448 | 23.9 | |
| Rejected ballots | | 15 | 0.8 | |
| Turnout | | 1889 | 23.5 | |
| Registered electors | | 8,040 | | |
| Labour hold | | Swing | | |

=== Darton East ===
Darton East
| Party | Candidate | Votes | % | ±% |
|---|---|---|---|---|
| Liberal Democrats | Leyla Nayeri | 1,196 | 46.7 | ▲7.9 |
| Labour | Teresa Ann Wilcockson | 951 | 37.2 | ▲12.2 |
| Reform | Aiden Ian Benoit | 258 | 10.1 | N/A |
| Conservative | Gillian Ruth Millner | 96 | 3.8 | ▼7.4 |
| Yorkshire | Simon Biltcliffe | 58 | 2.3 | N/A |
| Majority | | 245 | 9.6 | |
| Rejected ballots | | 10 | 0.4 | |
| Turnout | | 2569 | 28.9 | |
| Registered electors | | 8,874 | | |
| Liberal Democrats hold | | Swing | ▼2.1 | |

=== Darton West ===
Darton West
| Party | Candidate | Votes | % | ±% |
|---|---|---|---|---|
| Labour | Alice Cave | 1,074 | 45.1 | ▲7.6 |
| Green | Trevor Anthony Mayne | 495 | 20.8 | ▼6.1 |
| Reform | Shaun Kenneth Turner | 409 | 17.2 | N/A |
| Liberal Democrats | Kevin Bennett | 203 | 8.5 | ▲5.5 |
| Conservative | Bee D’abeille Lokkit | 200 | 8.4 | ▼24.2 |
| Majority | | 579 | 24.3 | |
| Rejected ballots | | 8 | 0.3 | |
| Turnout | | 2389 | 26.8 | |
| Registered electors | | 8,898 | | |
| Labour hold | | Swing | ▲0.8 | |

=== Dearne North ===
Dearne North
| Party | Candidate | Votes | % | ±% |
|---|---|---|---|---|
| Labour | Wendy Ann Cain | 1,025 | 69.7 | ▲8.6 |
| English Democrats - "Putting England First!" | Maxine Spencer | 214 | 14.5 | ▲5.1 |
| Conservative | Mike Toon | 138 | 9.4 | ▼14.5 |
| Liberal Democrats | Brian John Evans | 94 | 6.4 | ▲3.6 |
| Majority | | 811 | 55.1 | |
| Rejected ballots | | 12 | 0.8 | |
| Turnout | | 1483 | 16.9 | |
| Registered electors | | 8,752 | | |
| Labour hold | | Swing | ▲1.8 | |

=== Dearne South ===
Dearne South
| Party | Candidate | Votes | % | ±% |
|---|---|---|---|---|
| Labour | Deborah Jane Pearson | 1,060 | 60.1 | ▼0.1 |
| SDP | David Alan Jarvis | 396 | 22.5 | ▲6.7 |
| Conservative | Elaine Weems | 131 | 7.4 | ▼10.2 |
| English Democrats - "Putting England First!" | Janus Polenceusz | 99 | 5.6 | ▲2.3 |
| Liberal Democrats | Linda Fielding | 77 | 4.4 | ▲1.3 |
| Majority | | 664 | 37.7 | |
| Rejected ballots | | 14 | 0.8 | |
| Turnout | | 1777 | 19.1 | |
| Registered electors | | 9,302 | | |
| Labour hold | | Swing | ▼3.3 | |

=== Dodworth ===
Dodworth
| Party | Candidate | Votes | % | ±% |
|---|---|---|---|---|
| Liberal Democrats | Chris Wray | 1,328 | 51.4 | ▲25.2 |
| Labour | Ian Hague-Brown | 896 | 34.7 | ▲12.6 |
| Conservative | Steven John Burkinshaw | 361 | 14.0 | ▼7.2 |
| Majority | | 432 | 16.7 | |
| Rejected ballots | | 26 | 1.0 | |
| Turnout | | 2611 | 31.2 | |
| Registered electors | | 8,373 | | |
| Liberal Democrats hold | | Swing | ▲6.3 | |

=== Hoyland Milton ===
Hoyland Milton
| Party | Candidate | Votes | % | ±% |
|---|---|---|---|---|
| Labour | Mick Stowe | 1,092 | 46.2 | ▲6.6 |
| Reform | Michael James Davies | 697 | 29.5 | N/A |
| Conservative | Andrew Millner | 191 | 8.1 | ▼27.6 |
| Liberal Democrats | Glenn Lawrence | 175 | 7.4 | ▲4.0 |
| Green | Tom Heyes | 162 | 6.8 | ▼1.2 |
| TUSC | Angela Ruth Waller | 49 | 2.1 | 0.0 |
| Majority | | 395 | 16.7 | |
| Rejected ballots | | 7 | 0.3 | |
| Turnout | | 2373 | 25.7 | |
| Registered electors | | 9,247 | | |
| Labour hold | | Swing | | |

=== Kingstone ===
Kingstone
| Party | Candidate | Votes | % | ±% |
|---|---|---|---|---|
| Liberal Democrats | Steve Bullcock | 791 | 44.9 | ▲38.2 |
| Labour | Simon John Jordan Williamson | 591 | 33.5 | ▼4.6 |
| Reform | Liam James Hardcastle | 169 | 9.6 | N/A |
| Green | Peter Gordon Giles | 114 | 6.5 | ▼3.4 |
| Conservative | Roger Haw | 69 | 3.9 | ▼13.0 |
| TUSC | Tracey-Ann Holland | 28 | 1.6 | ▼0.6 |
| Majority | | 200 | 11.4 | |
| Rejected ballots | | 8 | 0.5 | |
| Turnout | | 1770 | 22.5 | |
| Registered electors | | 7,877 | | |
| Liberal Democrats gain from Labour | | Swing | ▲16.8 | |

=== Monk Bretton ===
Monk Bretton
| Party | Candidate | Votes | % | ±% |
|---|---|---|---|---|
| Labour | Steven Green | 1,032 | 51.0 | ▼3.6 |
| Independent | Rachel Jane Stewart | 784 | 38.8 | N/A |
| Conservative | Alex Wilkinson | 132 | 6.5 | ▼14.5 |
| Liberal Democrats | Susan Mary Rose | 75 | 3.7 | ▲1.7 |
| Majority | | 248 | 12.3 | |
| Rejected ballots | | 15 | 0.7 | |
| Turnout | | 2038 | 22.6 | |
| Registered electors | | 9,001 | | |
| Labour hold | | Swing | | |

=== North East ===
North East
| Party | Candidate | Votes | % | ±% |
|---|---|---|---|---|
| Labour | Dorothy Coates | 1,085 | 53.9 | ▲4.7 |
| Independent | Raymond Archer | 443 | 22.0 | N/A |
| Yorkshire | Tony Devoy | 214 | 10.6 | N/A |
| Conservative | Samuel Wilkinson | 165 | 8.2 | ▼11.1 |
| Liberal Democrats | Samantha Bullock | 107 | 5.3 | ▲2.8 |
| Majority | | 642 | 31.9 | |
| Rejected ballots | | 12 | 0.6 | |
| Turnout | | 2026 | 19.5 | |
| Registered electors | | 10,372 | | |
| Labour hold | | Swing | | |

=== Old Town ===
Old Town
| Party | Candidate | Votes | % | ±% |
|---|---|---|---|---|
| Labour | Phil Lofts | 1,130 | 57.0 | ▲13.9 |
| Conservative | Clive Watkinson | 292 | 14.7 | ▼8.3 |
| Green | Gillian Margaret Nixon | 258 | 13.0 | ▲4.9 |
| Liberal Democrats | Patrick Dimelow Smith | 196 | 9.9 | ▲5.5 |
| TUSC | Steve Dangerfield | 106 | 5.3 | ▲4.3 |
| Majority | | 838 | 42.3 | |
| Rejected ballots | | 19 | 0.9 | |
| Turnout | | 2001 | 23.2 | |
| Registered electors | | 8,618 | | |
| Labour hold | | Swing | ▲2.8 | |

=== Penistone East ===
Penistone East
| Party | Candidate | Votes | % | ±% |
|---|---|---|---|---|
| Labour | John Roberts | 1,533 | 42.1 | ▲19.0 |
| Conservative | Peter Millar | 1,377 | 37.8 | ▼7.8 |
| Liberal Democrats | Andy Waters | 385 | 10.6 | ▼13.5 |
| Green | Kate Helen Raynor | 346 | 9.5 | ▲2.3 |
| Majority | | 156 | 4.3 | |
| Rejected ballots | | 40 | 1.1 | |
| Turnout | | 3,681 | 37.9 | |
| Registered electors | | 9,713 | | |
| Labour gain from Conservative | | Swing | ▲5.6 | |

=== Penistone West ===
Penistone West
| Party | Candidate | Votes | % | ±% |
|---|---|---|---|---|
| Liberal Democrats | Mandy Lowe Flello | 1,414 | 39.1 | ▲1.7 |
| Labour Co-op | Frances Nixon | 1,061 | 29.4 | N/A |
| Conservative | Roy Garratt | 447 | 12.4 | ▼17.9 |
| Reform | David Wood | 429 | 11.9 | ▲7.6 |
| Green | Richard Thomas James Trotman | 263 | 7.3 | ▼1.4 |
| Majority | | 353 | 9.8 | |
| Rejected ballots | | 12 | 0.3 | |
| Turnout | | 3626 | 35.9 | |
| Registered electors | | 10,096 | | |
| Liberal Democrats hold | | Swing | | |

=== Rockingham ===
Rockingham
| Party | Candidate | Votes | % | ±% |
|---|---|---|---|---|
| Labour | Sherry Holling | 884 | 36.2 | ▼2.9 |
| Independent | Jaz Holt | 731 | 29.9 | N/A |
| Reform | Robert Lomas | 457 | 18.7 | N/A |
| Conservative | Phil Weems | 244 | 10.0 | ▼29.1 |
| Liberal Democrats | Sue Waters | 128 | 5.2 | ▲0.7 |
| Majority | | 153 | 6.3 | |
| Rejected ballots | | 18 | 0.7 | |
| Turnout | | 2462 | 29.0 | |
| Registered electors | | 8,494 | | |
| Labour hold | | Swing | | |

=== Royston ===
Royston
| Party | Candidate | Votes | % | ±% |
|---|---|---|---|---|
| Labour | Caroline Makinson | 1,082 | 58.6 | ▲15.1 |
| Independent | Neil Fisher | 440 | 23.8 | ▲19.8 |
| Conservative | Michael Barraclough | 187 | 10.1 | ▼7.7 |
| Liberal Democrats | Jonathan Hood | 87 | 4.7 | ▲2.8 |
| TUSC | Jennifer Louise Barker | 51 | 2.8 | N/A |
| Majority | | 642 | 34.8 | |
| Rejected ballots | | 11 | 0.6 | |
| Turnout | | 1858 | 21.2 | |
| Registered electors | | 8,771 | | |
| Labour hold | | Swing | ▼2.4 | |

=== St Helen’s ===
St Helen’s
| Party | Candidate | Votes | % | ±% |
|---|---|---|---|---|
| Labour | Sarah Jane Tattersall | 1,004 | 75.2 | ▲18.3 |
| Liberal Democrats | Matthew Rigden Nicholson | 191 | 14.3 | ▲11.3 |
| Conservative | Lee Ogden | 140 | 10.5 | ▼8.6 |
| Majority | | 813 | 60.9 | |
| Rejected ballots | | 24 | 1.8 | |
| Turnout | | 1359 | 16.9 | |
| Registered electors | | 8,051 | | |
| Labour hold | | Swing | ▲3.5 | |

=== Stairfoot ===
Stairfoot
| Party | Candidate | Votes | % | ±% |
|---|---|---|---|---|
| Labour | Karen Dyson | 955 | 51.0 | ▲13.0 |
| Reform | Luca Lorenzo Turner | 518 | 27.7 | N/A |
| Liberal Democrats | James Robert Kitching | 211 | 11.3 | ▲9.5 |
| Conservative | Mark Kevan Hitchmough | 188 | 10.0 | ▼5.4 |
| Majority | | 437 | 23.3 | |
| Rejected ballots | | 16 | 0.8 | |
| Turnout | | 1888 | 20.8 | |
| Registered electors | | 9,080 | | |
| Labour hold | | Swing | | |

=== Wombwell ===
Wombwell
| Party | Candidate | Votes | % | ±% |
|---|---|---|---|---|
| Labour | James Lewis Higginbottom | 1,370 | 65.7 | ▲10.3 |
| Reform | Simon Glen Moore | 317 | 15.2 | N/A |
| Conservative | Debbie Toon | 161 | 7.7 | ▼19.0 |
| Green | Jessica Claire Roebuck | 149 | 7.1 | ▲1.9 |
| Liberal Democrats | Robert Welton Green | 89 | 4.3 | ▲1.0 |
| Majority | | 1053 | 50.5 | |
| Rejected ballots | | 9 | 0.4 | |
| Turnout | | 2095 | 21.0 | |
| Registered electors | | 9,958 | | |
| Labour hold | | Swing | | |

=== Worsbrough ===
Worsbrough
| Party | Candidate | Votes | % | ±% |
|---|---|---|---|---|
| Labour | Roy Bowser | 996 | 58.3 | ▲21.0 |
| Reform | Jamie Thomas Owen | 338 | 19.8 | N/A |
| Liberal Democrats | Sarah Calvert | 223 | 13.1 | ▲7.3 |
| Conservative | Charlotte Wilkinson | 150 | 8.8 | ▼13.1 |
| Majority | | 658 | 38.5 | |
| Rejected ballots | | 11 | 0.6 | |
| Turnout | | 1718 | 23.3 | |
| Registered electors | | 7,376 | | |
| Labour hold | | Swing | | |

== Changes 2024–2026 ==
- November 2024: Sam Christmas (Liberal Democrats) resigned from the Dodworth seat, last elected in 2023; a by-election was held in December 2024.
- December 2024: Andy Waters (Liberal Democrats) won the Dodworth by-election.
- February 2025: David White, elected as a Conservative in Rockingham in 2021, resigned from Reform UK and sat as an independent councillor.
- July 2025: Clive Pickering (Labour), elected in Old Town in 2022, joined the Liberal Democrats.
- August 2025: Trevor Smith (Labour), elected in Darfield in 2023, left the party to sit as an independent councillor.
- 31 December 2025: David White resigned as councillor for Rockingham, the seat he was elected to in 2021; no by-election was held because the vacancy fell within six months of the scheduled May 2026 elections.

=== By-elections ===
==== Dodworth ====
Dodworth by-election 12 December 2024
| Party | Candidate | Votes | % | ±% |
|---|---|---|---|---|
| Liberal Democrats | Andy Waters | 1,029 | 49.7 | ▼1.2 |
| Reform | Eric Hodgson | 503 | 24.3 | N/A |
| Labour | Kate Hutchinson | 334 | 16.1 | ▼18.2 |
| Conservative | Steven Burkinshaw | 147 | 7.1 | ▼6.7 |
| Green | Trevor Mayne | 57 | 2.8 | N/A |
| Majority | | 526 | 25.4 | |
| Rejected ballots | | 3 | 0.1 | |
| Turnout | | 2,073 | 24.4 | |
| Registered electors | | 8,503 | | |
| Liberal Democrats hold | | Swing | | |

The by-election was triggered by the resignation of Liberal Democrat councillor Sam Christmas.
