= 2022 Barnsley Metropolitan Borough Council election =

2022 local election in Barnsley

- 5 May 2022

21 out of 63 seats to Barnsley Metropolitan Borough Council 32 seats needed for a majority

	First party	Second party	Third party
Leader	Stephen Houghton	Hannah Kitching	John Wilson
Party	Labour	Liberal Democrats	Conservative
Last election	49 seats, 40.4%	7 seats, 11.8%	3 seats, 25.1%
Seats before	49	7	3
Seats won	16	3	2
Seats after	46	9	4
Seat change	▼3	▲2	▲1
Popular vote	22,115	7,829	9,268
Percentage	46.2%	16.3%	19.4%
Swing	▲5.8%	▲4.5%	▼5.7%
	Fourth party	Fifth party
Leader	Andrew Gillis	Unknown
Party	Independent	Barnsley Ind.
Last election	2 seats, 2.3%	1 seat, 10.6%
Seats before	3	1
Seats won	0	0
Seats after	3	1
Seat change	Steady	Steady
Popular vote	1,812	3,137
Percentage	3.8%	6.5%
Swing	▲1.5%	▼4.1%
- Winner of each seat at the 2022 Barnsley Metropolitan Borough Council election
Leader before election
Stephen Houghton
Labour
Leader after election
Stephen Houghton
Labour

The 2022 Barnsley Metropolitan Borough Council election took place on 5 May 2022. One third of councillors — 21 out of 63 — were elected. The election took place alongside the 2022 South Yorkshire mayoral election and other local elections across the United Kingdom.

In the previous council election in 2021, Labour maintained its longstanding control of the council, holding 49 seats after the election. The Liberal Democrats formed the main opposition with seven seats, with the Conservatives on three, independents and the Democrats and Veterans Party having two each and a single Barnsley Independent Group councillor.

== Background ==
Result of the council election when these seats were last contested in 2018

Result of the most recent council election in 2021

The Local Government Act 1972 created a two-tier system of metropolitan counties and districts covering Greater Manchester, Merseyside, South Yorkshire, Tyne and Wear, the West Midlands, and West Yorkshire starting in 1974. Barnsley was a district of the South Yorkshire metropolitan county. The Local Government Act 1985 abolished the metropolitan counties, with metropolitan districts taking on most of their powers as metropolitan boroughs. The South Yorkshire Combined Authority was established in 2014 as the Sheffield City Region Combined Authority, which began electing the mayor of South Yorkshire in 2018.

Since its formation, Barnsley has continuously been under Labour control. Councillors have predominantly been elected from the Labour Party, various independents, the Conservative Party and the Liberal Democrats. The council elected a large number of Barnsley Independent Group councillors in the 2006 election, whose numbers have been falling since. Councillors who will be seeking re-election will have been most recently elected in the 2018 election, in order to complete a four-year term. In that election, 19 Labour councillors were election alongside one Conservative councillor and one Liberal Democrat councillor. In the most recent election in 2021, seventeen Labour councillors were elected with 40.4% of the vote across the borough, with three Liberal Democrats on 11.8% of the vote across the borough and one Conservative with 25.1% of the vote across the borough. Labour held the Rockingham ward after a coin toss broke a tie between the Labour candidate and the Conservative candidate. After that election, the council had 49 Labour councillors, seven Liberal Democrats, three Conservatives, two independents, two Democrats and Veterans and one Barnsley Independent Group councillor. The councillor Trevor Smith joined the Labour Party after his previous Democrats and Veterans Party was dissolved.

The positions up for election in 2022 were last elected in 2018, when Labour won 19 seats and the Conservatives and Liberal Democrats won one each.

== Electoral process ==
The council elects its councillors in thirds, with a third being up for election every year for three years, with no election in the fourth year. The election will take place by first-past-the-post voting, with wards generally being represented by three councillors, with one elected in each election year to serve a four-year term.

All registered electors (British, Irish, Commonwealth and European Union citizens) living in Barnsley aged 18 or over will be entitled to vote in the election. People who live at two addresses in different councils, such as university students with different term-time and holiday addresses, are entitled to be registered for and vote in elections in both local authorities. Voting in-person at polling stations will take place from 07:00 to 22:00 on election day, and voters will be able to apply for postal votes or proxy votes in advance of the election.

== Previous council composition ==
After 2021 election		Before 2022 election	
Party	Seats	Party	Seats
Labour	49	Labour	49
Liberal Democrats	7	Liberal Democrats	7
Conservative	3	Conservative	3
Democrats and Veterans	2	Independent	3
Independent	2	Barnsley Ind.	1
Barnsley Ind.	1		

== Results summary ==
2022 Barnsley Metropolitan Borough Council election
Party	This election				Full council			This election		
Party	Candidates	Seats	Net	Seats %	Other	Total	Total %	Votes	Votes %	+/−
Labour	{{{candidates}}}	16	▼3	76.2	30	46	73.0	22,115	46.2	+5.8
Liberal Democrats	{{{candidates}}}	3	▲2	14.3	6	9	14.3	7,829	16.3	+4.5
Conservative	{{{candidates}}}	2	▲1	9.5	2	4	6.3	9,268	19.4	-5.7
Independent	{{{candidates}}}	0	Steady	0.0	3	3	4.8	1,812	3.8	+1.5
Barnsley Ind.	{{{candidates}}}	0	Steady	0.0	1	1	1.6	3,137	6.5	-4.1
Green	{{{candidates}}}	0	Steady	0.0	0	0	0.0	1,825	3.8	-2.8
SDP	{{{candidates}}}	0	Steady	0.0	0	0	0.0	488	1.0	±0.0
Freedom Alliance	{{{candidates}}}	0	Steady	0.0	0	0	0.0	451	0.9	N/A
TUSC	{{{candidates}}}	0	Steady	0.0	0	0	0.0	347	0.7	+0.3
Yorkshire	{{{candidates}}}	0	Steady	0.0	0	0	0.0	328	0.7	+0.2
English Democrat	{{{candidates}}}	0	Steady	0.0	0	0	0.0	229	0.5	-0.2
NIP	{{{candidates}}}	0	Steady	0.0	0	0	0.0	65	0.1	N/A

== Ward results ==
=== Central ===
Central
Party	Candidate	Votes	%	±%
Labour	Janine Debra Moyes	946	51.2	▲2.3
Barnsley Ind.	Steve Bullcock	476	25.7	New
Conservative	Chad Bronson	282	15.3	▼11.5
Liberal Democrats	Catherine Theresa Rogerson	145	7.8	▲2.1
Majority		470	25.4	▲3.4
Turnout		1,866	21.9	▼2.0
Registered electors		8,531		
Rejected ballots		17	0.9	
Labour hold		Swing		

=== Cudworth ===
Cudworth
Party	Candidate	Votes	%	±%
Labour	Joe Hayward	1,192	64.9	▼2.0
Yorkshire	Tony Devoy	328	17.9	New
Conservative	Mark Brook	228	12.4	▼3.1
Liberal Democrats	Elizabeth Kate Waters	89	4.8	▲1.1
Majority		864	47.0	▼4.4
Turnout		1,845	22.0	▼1.8
Registered electors		8,389		
Rejected ballots		20	1.1	
Labour hold		Swing		

=== Darfield ===
Darfield
Party	Candidate	Votes	%	±%
Labour	Pauline Markham	1,234	62.7	▲12.7
Conservative	Ben Harrison	406	20.6	▼5.1
SDP	Scott Andrew Mckenzie	208	10.6	New
Liberal Democrats	Simon Richard Hulme	121	6.1	▲2.8
Majority		828	42.1	▲17.8
Turnout		1,981	24.6	▼4.6
Registered electors		8,059		
Rejected ballots		11	0.6	
Labour hold		Swing		

=== Darton East ===
Darton East
Party	Candidate	Votes	%	±%
Liberal Democrats	Dickie Denton	1,530	56.5	▲17.7
Labour	Teresa Wilcockson	888	32.8	▲7.8
Conservative	Lee Ogden	288	10.6	▼0.6
Majority		642	23.7	▲9.9
Turnout		2,736	30.9	▼1.7
Registered electors		8,838		
Rejected ballots		30	1.1	
Liberal Democrats gain from Labour		Swing	19.1	

=== Darton West ===
Darton West
Party	Candidate	Votes	%	±%
Labour	Sharon Howard	975	39.1	▲1.6
Green	Tom Heyes	749	30.0	▲3.1
Conservative	John Miller	493	19.8	▼12.8
Liberal Democrats	Kevin Bennett	211	8.5	▲5.5
Freedom Alliance	Jonathan Richard Tilt	65	2.6	
Majority		226	9.1	▲4.2
Turnout		2,505	28.6	▼3.7
Registered electors		8,750		
Rejected ballots		12	0.5	
Labour hold		Swing		

=== Dearne North ===
Dearne North
Party	Candidate	Votes	%	±%
Labour	Sue Bellamy	1,117	72.1	▲11.0
Conservative	Rosemary Sharon Jackson	195	12.6	▼11.3
English Democrat	Maxine Spencer	128	8.3	▼1.1
Liberal Democrats	Brian John Evans	71	4.6	▲1.8
SDP	Savannah Paige Jarvis	39	2.5	▼0.2
Majority		922	59.5	▲22.3
Turnout		1,560	18.5	▼2.9
Registered electors		8,444		
Rejected ballots		10	0.6	
Labour hold		Swing		

=== Dearne South ===
Dearne South
Party	Candidate	Votes	%	±%
Labour	Janine Marie Bowler	1,307	71.5	▲11.3
Conservative	Donna Marie Cutts	243	13.3	▼4.3
SDP	David Alan Jarvis	115	6.3	▼9.5
English Democrat	Janus Polenceusz	101	5.5	▲2.2
Liberal Democrats	Linda Fielding	62	3.4	▲0.3
Majority		1,064	58.2	▲17.6
Turnout		1,848	20.1	▼3.9
Registered electors		9,179		
Rejected ballots		8	0.4	
Labour hold		Swing		

=== Dodworth ===
Dodworth
Party	Candidate	Votes	%	±%
Liberal Democrats	Will Fielding	1,315	45.7	▲19.5
Labour	Neil Gareth Wright	944	32.8	▲10.7
Conservative	Kirk Harper	518	18.0	▼3.2
Freedom Alliance	Amanda Griffin	101	3.5	
Majority		371	12.9	▲11.4
Turnout		2,893	34.0	▼1.2
Registered electors		8,506		
Rejected ballots		15	0.5	
Liberal Democrats gain from Barnsley Ind.		Swing	39.0	

=== Hoyland Milton ===
Hoyland Milton
Party	Candidate	Votes	%	±%
Labour	Robin Franklin	1,212	48.3	▲8.7
Conservative	Cassie Northwood	617	24.6	▼11.1
Independent	Daniel Simpson	398	15.9	▲4.5
Liberal Democrats	Glenn Charles Lawrence	162	6.5	▲3.1
TUSC	Angela Waller	119	4.7	▲2.6
Majority		595	23.7	▲19.8
Turnout		2,522	27.1	▼3.2
Registered electors		9,304		
Rejected ballots		14	0.6	
Labour hold		Swing		

=== Kingstone ===
Kingstone
Party	Candidate	Votes	%	±%
Labour	Kath Mitchell	648	38.8	▲0.7
Barnsley Ind.	Liam Hardcastle	535	32.0	▲10.4
Conservative	Michael Davies	153	9.2	▼7.7
Green	Peter Gordon Giles	121	7.2	▼2.7
Liberal Democrats	Philip David Wright	80	4.8	▼1.9
NIP	Liam Stephen Starsong	65	3.9	New
Freedom Alliance	Judy Barnsley	38	2.3	
SDP	Steve Vajda	32	1.9	New
Majority		113	6.8	▼9.7
Turnout		1,684	21.7	▼2.1
Registered electors		7,757		
Rejected ballots		12	0.7	
Labour hold		Swing		

=== Monk Bretton ===
Monk Bretton
Party	Candidate	Votes	%	±%
Labour	Kenneth Richardson	1,070	50.7	▼3.9
Independent	Rachel Jane Stewart	660	31.3	New
Conservative	Alexander Wilkinson	257	12.2	
Liberal Democrats	Sue Rose	123	5.8	▲3.8
Majority		410	19.4	▼14.2
Turnout		2,116	23.8	▼2.1
Registered electors		8,907		
Rejected ballots		6	0.3	
Labour hold		Swing		

=== North East ===
North East
Party	Candidate	Votes	%	±%
Labour	Ashley James Peace	1,249	54.2	▲5.0
Barnsley Ind.	Raymond Archer	639	27.7	▼1.2
Conservative	Samuel Wilkinson	323	14.0	▼5.3
Liberal Democrats	Sam Christmas	93	4.0	▲1.5
Majority		610	26.5	▲6.2
Turnout		2,320	22.6	▼2.8
Registered electors		10,268		
Rejected ballots		16	0.7	
Labour hold		Swing		

=== Old Town ===
Old Town
Party	Candidate	Votes	%	±%
Labour	Clive Melvin Pickering	1,147	51.4	▲8.3
Conservative	John Carr	450	20.2	▼2.8
Green	Gillian Margaret Nixon	347	15.5	▲7.4
Freedom Alliance	Charlotte Sykes	145	6.5	
Liberal Democrats	Patrick Dimelow Smith	144	6.4	▲2.0
Majority		697	31.2	▲11.1
Turnout		2,253	26.2	▼3.3
Registered electors		8,596		
Rejected ballots		17	0.8	
Labour hold		Swing		

=== Penistone East ===
Penistone East
Party	Candidate	Votes	%	±%
Conservative	Robert John Barnard	1,643	43.0	▼2.6
Labour	Jill Hayler	1,271	33.3	▲10.2
Liberal Democrats	Andy Waters	507	13.3	▼10.8
Green	Rebecca Jean Trotman	401	10.5	▲3.3
Majority		372	9.7	▼11.8
Turnout		3,854	39.9	▼4.8
Registered electors		9,666		
Rejected ballots		28	0.7	
Conservative hold		Swing		

=== Penistone West ===
Penistone West
Party	Candidate	Votes	%	±%
Liberal Democrats	Hannah Ruth Kitching	2,207	56.6	▲19.2
Conservative	Roy Garratt	668	17.1	▼13.2
Labour	James Aron Bangert	518	13.3	▼6.0
Independent	David Wood	296	7.6	New
Green	Richard Thomas James Trotman	207	5.3	▼3.4
Majority		1,539	39.5	▲32.4
Turnout		3,931	38.8	▲0.3
Registered electors		10,142		
Rejected ballots		16	0.4	
Liberal Democrats hold		Swing		

=== Rockingham ===
Rockingham
Party	Candidate	Votes	%	±%
Conservative	David White	1,109	42.2	▲3.1
Labour	James Gregory Andrews	1,067	40.6	▲1.5
TUSC	Karen Fletcher	228	8.7	▲4.5
Liberal Democrats	Susan Jane Waters	222	8.5	▲4.0
Majority		42	1.6	▲1.6
Turnout		2,647	30.8	▼1.2
Registered electors		8,606		
Rejected ballots		19	0.7	
Conservative gain from Labour		Swing	16.3	

=== Royston ===
Royston
Party	Candidate	Votes	%	±%
Labour	Dave Webster	534	53.4	▲9.7
Independent	Neil Fisher	246	24.6	▲18.5
Conservative	Macaulay Larkin	167	16.7	Steady
Liberal Democrats	Jonathan Paul Hood	53	5.3	▲4.6
Majority		288	28.8	▲16.7
Turnout		2,062	23.6	▼3.8
Registered electors		8,724		
Rejected ballots		24	1.2	
Labour hold		Swing		

Note: A box of postal votes was initially omitted from the count. The votes were subsequently counted and recalculated; Dave Webster (Labour) remained elected.

=== St Helen's ===
St Helen's
Party	Candidate	Votes	%	±%
Labour	Dave Leech	1,064	73.8	▲16.9
Conservative	George Hill	229	15.9	▼3.2
Liberal Democrats	Matthew Rigden Nicholson	148	10.3	▲7.3
Majority		835	57.9	▲20.1
Turnout		1,449	18.2	▼3.7
Registered electors		7,976		
Rejected ballots		14	1.0	
Labour hold		Swing		

=== Stairfoot ===
Stairfoot
Party	Candidate	Votes	%	±%
Labour	Ian Shirt	906	44.1	▲6.1
Barnsley Ind.	Gavin Frost	756	36.8	▲21.3
Conservative	Elizabeth Hill	285	13.9	▼1.5
Liberal Democrats	James Robert Kitching	106	5.2	▲3.4
Majority		150	7.3	▼1.4
Turnout		2,062	22.9	▼3.1
Registered electors		9,018		
Rejected ballots		8	0.4	
Labour hold		Swing		

=== Wombwell ===
Wombwell
Party	Candidate	Votes	%	±%
Labour	Robert Frost	1,362	65.6	▲10.2
Conservative	Bee Lokkit-Wan	289	13.9	▼12.8
Liberal Democrats	Paul Nugent	228	11.0	▲7.7
Freedom Alliance	Amy Stewart	102	4.9	
SDP	Jon Seymour	94	4.5	▲0.3
Majority		1,073	51.7	▲23.0
Turnout		2,087	21.4	▼4.0
Registered electors		9,754		
Rejected ballots		11	0.5	
Labour hold		Swing		

=== Worsbrough ===
Worsbrough
Party	Candidate	Votes	%	±%
Labour	John Clarke	913	45.5	▲8.2
Barnsley Ind.	Gill Carr	731	36.4	▲1.4
Conservative	Andrew Millner	229	11.4	▼10.5
Liberal Democrats	Sarah Calvert	133	6.6	▲0.8
Majority		182	9.1	▲6.8
Turnout		2,017	27.1	▼2.5
Registered electors		7,443		
Rejected ballots		11	0.5	
Labour hold		Swing		

== Changes 2022–2023 ==
- David White, elected as a Conservative councillor for Rockingham ward in May 2022, resigned from the Conservative Party in December 2022 to join Reform UK.
