= 2023 Barnsley Metropolitan Borough Council election =

2023 local election in Barnsley

- 4 May 2023

21 of 63 seats on Barnsley Metropolitan Borough Council 32 seats needed for a majority
- Turnout: 24.7%

	First party	Second party	Third party
Leader	Stephen Houghton	Hannah Kitching	None
Party	Labour	Liberal Democrats	Independent
Last election	46 seats, 46.2%	9 seats, 16.3%	3 seats, 3.8%
Seats before	46	9	3
Seats won	15	4	2
Seats after	48	10	2
Seat change	▲2	▲1	▼1
Popular vote	20,932	7,926	4,853
Percentage	46.1%	17.5%	10.7%
Swing	▼0.1%	▲1.2%	▲6.9%
	Fourth party	Fifth party	Sixth party
Leader	John Wilson	David White	Andrew Gillis
Party	Conservative	Reform	Barnsley Ind.
Last election	4 seats, 19.4%	Did not stand	1 seat, 6.5%
Seats before	3	1	1
Seats won	0	0	0
Seats after	2	1	0
Seat change	▼1	Steady	▼1
Popular vote	6,456	1,322	0
Percentage	14.2%	2.9%	0.0%
Swing	▼5.2%	N/A	▼6.5%
- The winner of each seat by party in the 2023 Barnsley Metropolitan Borough Council Election
Leader before election
Stephen Houghton
Labour
Leader after election
Stephen Houghton
Labour

Elections to Barnsley Metropolitan Borough Council took place on 4 May 2023 alongside other elections in the United Kingdom. One third of the council was up for election.

== Background ==
The Labour Party have controlled the council since 1973. In May 2021, Labour retained control but the council was criticised for not counting over 1,000 postal votes. In May 2022, Labour retained overall control of the council, but lost three seats. In December 2022, Conservative councillor for Rockingham ward David White defected to Reform UK.

== Previous council composition ==
After 2022 election		Before 2023 election	
Party	Seats	Party	Seats
Labour	46	Labour	45
Liberal Democrats	9	Liberal Democrats	9
Conservative	4	Conservative	3
Independent	3	Independent	3
Barnsley Ind.	1	Barnsley Ind.	1
		Reform	1
		Vacant	1

== Results summary ==
2023 Barnsley Metropolitan Borough Council election
Party	This election				Full council			This election		
Party	Candidates	Seats	Net	Seats %	Other	Total	Total %	Votes	Votes %	+/−
Labour	{{{candidates}}}	15	▲2	71.5	33	48	76.2	20,932	46.1	▼0.1
Liberal Democrats	{{{candidates}}}	4	▲1	19.0	6	10	15.9	7,926	17.5	▲1.2
Independent	{{{candidates}}}	2	▼1	9.5	0	2	3.2	4,853	10.7	▲6.9
Conservative	{{{candidates}}}	0	▼1	0.0	2	2	3.2	6,456	14.2	▼5.2
Reform	{{{candidates}}}	0	Steady	0.0	1	1	1.5	1,322	2.9	N/A
Green	{{{candidates}}}	0	Steady	0.0	0	0	0.0	2,094	4.6	▲0.8
Yorkshire	{{{candidates}}}	0	Steady	0.0	0	0	0.0	918	2.0	▲1.3
SDP	{{{candidates}}}	0	Steady	0.0	0	0	0.0	462	1.0	Steady
TUSC	{{{candidates}}}	0	Steady	0.0	0	0	0.0	241	0.5	▼0.2
English Constitution	{{{candidates}}}	0	Steady	0.0	0	0	0.0	155	0.3	N/A

The Barnsley Independent Group did not stand in this election and lost its sole seat on the council.

== Ward results ==
On 11 April 2023, the full list of candidates was published.

=== Central ===
Central
Party	Candidate	Votes	%	±%
Labour	Martin O'Donoghue	846	46.8	▼4.4
Yorkshire	Steve Bullcock	456	25.2	▼0.5
Conservative	Charlotte Wilkinson	176	9.7	▼5.6
Green	Chris Scarfe	153	8.5	N/A
Independent	Ruby Paul	92	5.1	N/A
Liberal Democrats	Catherine Rogerson	84	4.6	▼3.2
Majority		390	21.6	
Rejected ballots		5	0.3	
Turnout		1,812	20.8	
Registered electors		8,713		
Labour hold		Swing	▼2.0	

=== Cudworth ===
Cudworth
Party	Candidate	Votes	%	±%
Labour	Anita Cherryholme	1,137	69.1	▲4.2
Conservative	Mark Brook	248	15.1	▲2.7
Green	Ken Smith	148	9.0	N/A
Liberal Democrats	Elizabeth Waters	113	6.9	▲2.1
Majority		889	54.0	
Rejected ballots		12	0.7	
Turnout		1,657	16.6	
Registered electors		8,437		
Labour hold		Swing	▲0.8	

=== Darfield ===
Darfield
Party	Candidate	Votes	%	±%
Labour	Trevor Smith	912	51.0	▼11.7
Reform	Scott McKenzie	374	20.9	▲10.3
Conservative	Benjamin Harrison	334	18.7	▼1.9
Liberal Democrats	Simon Hulme	168	9.4	▲3.3
Majority		538	30.1	
Rejected ballots		11	0.6	
Turnout		1,799	22.7	
Registered electors		7,915		
Labour hold		Swing	▼11.0	

=== Darton East ===
Darton East
Party	Candidate	Votes	%	±%
Liberal Democrats	Steve Hunt	1,699	64.7	▲8.2
Labour	Teresa Wilcockson	770	29.3	▼3.5
Conservative	John Miller	156	5.9	▼0.8
Majority		929	35.4	
Rejected ballots		15	0.6	
Turnout		2,641	29.9	
Registered electors		8,828		
Liberal Democrats hold		Swing	▲5.8	

=== Darton West ===
Darton West
Party	Candidate	Votes	%	±%
Labour	Trevor Cave	978	41.4	▲2.3
Green	Lee Long	690	29.2	▼0.8
Conservative	Bee Lokkit	302	12.8	▼7.0
Yorkshire	Simon Biltcliffe	274	11.6	
Liberal Democrats	Kevin Bennett	118	5.0	▼3.5
Majority		288	12.2	
Rejected ballots		8	0.3	
Turnout		2,371	27.0	
Registered electors		8,777		
Labour hold		Swing	▲1.5	

=== Dearne North ===
Dearne North
Party	Candidate	Votes	%	±%
Labour	Martin Morrell	1,048	72.8	▲1.0
Conservative	Gillian Millner	152	10.6	▼2.0
English Constitution Party	Maxine Spencer	118	8.2	
Liberal Democrats	Brian Evans	106	7.4	▲2.8
SDP	Steve Vajda	16	1.1	▼1.4
Majority		896	62.2	
Rejected ballots		9	0.6	
Turnout		1,449	16.9	
Registered electors		8,548		
Labour hold		Swing	▲1.5	

=== Dearne South ===
Dearne South
Party	Candidate	Votes	%	±%
Labour	Abi Moore	1,066	59.5	▼12.0
SDP	Dave Jarvis	446	24.9	▲18.6
Conservative	Rosemary Jackson	162	9.0	▼4.3
Liberal Democrats	Linda Fielding	81	4.5	▲1.1
English Constitution Party	Janus Polenceusz	37	2.1	
Majority		620	34.6	
Rejected ballots		8	0.4	
Turnout		1,801	19.5	
Registered electors		9,217		
Labour gain from Independent		Swing	▼15.3	

=== Dodworth ===
Dodworth
Party	Candidate	Votes	%	±%
Liberal Democrats	Sam Christmas	1,407	55.2	▲9.5
Labour	Nicholas Riggs	806	31.6	▼1.2
Conservative	Lee Ogden	334	13.1	▼4.9
Majority		601	23.6	
Rejected ballots		13	0.5	
Turnout		2,561	30.6	
Registered electors		8,374		
Liberal Democrats hold		Swing	▲5.3	

=== Hoyland Milton ===
Hoyland Milton
Party	Candidate	Votes	%	±%
Labour	Tim Shepherd	1,052	42.7	▼5.6
Reform	Michael Davies	436	17.7	N/A
Conservative	Michael Toon	292	11.9	▼12.7
Independent	Cassie Northwood	284	11.5	▼13.1
Liberal Democrats	Glenn Lawrence	179	7.3	▲0.8
Green	Tom Heyes	148	6.0	N/A
TUSC	Angela Waller	73	3.0	▼1.7
Majority		616	25.0	
Rejected ballots		5	0.2	
Turnout		2,470	26.9	
Registered electors		9,183		
Labour hold		Swing	▲3.5	

=== Kingstone ===
Kingstone
Party	Candidate	Votes	%	±%
Liberal Democrats	Philip Wright	688	42.0	▲36.8
Labour	Kevin Williams	640	39.0	▲0.5
Green	Peter Giles	109	6.6	▼0.5
Independent	Judy Barnsley	99	6.0	▲3.8
Conservative	Roger Haw	71	4.3	▼4.8
TUSC	Tracey-Ann Holland	33	2.0	N/A
Majority		48	2.9	
Rejected ballots		4	0.2	
Turnout		1,645	21.3	
Registered electors		7,724		
Liberal Democrats gain from Labour		Swing	▲18.1	

=== Monk Bretton ===
Monk Bretton
Party	Candidate	Votes	%	±%
Labour	Margaret Sheard	1,056	50.4	▼0.5
Independent	Rachel Stewart	760	36.3	▲5.2
Conservative	Macaulay Larkin	182	8.7	▼3.6
Liberal Democrats	Sue Rose	98	4.7	▼1.1
Majority		296	14.1	
Rejected ballots		4	0.2	
Turnout		2,100	23.6	
Registered electors		8,894		
Labour gain from Independent		Swing	▼2.9	

=== North East ===
North East
Party	Candidate	Votes	%	±%
Labour	Ruth Booker	1,069	53.4	▼0.8
Independent	Raymond Archer	462	23.1	▼4.6
Conservative	Samuel Wilkinson	205	10.2	▼3.8
Yorkshire	Tony Devoy	188	9.4	N/A
Liberal Democrats	Kieran Oldfield	79	3.9	▼0.1
Majority		607	30.3	
Rejected ballots		10	0.5	
Turnout		2,013	19.8	
Registered electors		10,180		
Labour hold		Swing	▲1.9	

=== Old Town ===
Old Town
Party	Candidate	Votes	%	±%
Labour	Jo Newing	1,069	52.0	▲0.6
Conservative	Clive Watkinson	313	15.2	▼5.0
Independent	Charlotte Sykes	263	12.8	▲6.3
Green	Gillian Nixon	231	11.2	▼4.3
Liberal Democrats	Patrick Smith	125	6.1	▼0.3
TUSC	Steve Dangerfield	56	2.7	
Majority		756	36.8	
Rejected ballots		6	0.3	
Turnout		2,063	24.0	
Registered electors		8,587		
Labour hold		Swing	▲2.8	

=== Penistone East ===
Penistone East
Party	Candidate	Votes	%	±%
Labour	Alex Burnett	1,603	42.4	▲9.1
Conservative	Steven Burkinshaw	1,349	35.7	▼7.3
Liberal Democrats	Andrew Waters	486	12.9	▼0.4
Green	Rebecca Trotman	191	5.1	▼5.4
Independent	Amanda Griffin	153	4.0	N/A
Majority		254	6.7	
Rejected ballots		19	0.5	
Turnout		3,801	39.4	
Registered electors		9,647		
Labour gain from Conservative		Swing	▲8.2	

=== Penistone West ===
Penistone West
Party	Candidate	Votes	%	±%
Liberal Democrats	David Greenhough	1,613	45.9	▼9.7
Labour Co-op	Frances Nixon	810	23.0	▲9.7
Conservative	Roy Garratt	623	17.7	▲0.6
Green	Richard Trotman	268	7.6	▲2.3
Independent	Paula Button-Roberts	202	5.7	N/A
Majority		803	22.8	
Rejected ballots		21	0.6	
Turnout		3,539	35.2	
Registered electors		10,055		
Liberal Democrats hold		Swing	▼9.7	

=== Rockingham ===
Rockingham
Party	Candidate	Votes	%	±%
Independent	Andrew Wray	1,028	38.9	N/A
Labour	Jane Townsend	771	29.1	▼11.5
Conservative	Mark Highmouch	351	13.3	▼28.9
Reform	Brian Gregory	277	10.5	N/A
Green	Trevor Mayne	99	3.7	N/A
Liberal Democrats	Sue Waters	99	3.7	▼4.8
TUSC	Karen Fletcher	21	0.8	▼7.9
Majority		257	9.7	
Rejected ballots		6	0.2	
Turnout		2,653	31.1	
Registered electors		8,533		
Independent gain from Labour		Swing	▲8.7	

=== Royston ===
Royston
Party	Candidate	Votes	%	±%
Labour	Pauline McCarthy	1,132	58.8	▲5.6
Independent	Neil Fisher	366	19.0	▼3.5
Conservative	Michael Barraclough	272	14.1	▼3.7
Liberal Democrats	Jonathan Hood	97	5.0	▼1.5
TUSC	Jennifer Barker	58	3.0	N/A
Majority		766	39.8	
Rejected ballots		6	0.3	
Turnout		1,931	22.1	
Registered electors		8,748		
Labour hold		Swing	▲4.5	

=== St Helen's ===
St Helen's
Party	Candidate	Votes	%	±%
Labour	Neil Wright	1,035	74.6	▲0.8
Conservative	Andrew Millner	181	13.0	▼2.9
Liberal Democrats	Matthew Nicholson	172	12.4	▲2.1
Majority		854	61.5	
Rejected ballots		6	0.4	
Turnout		1,394	17.6	
Registered electors		7,925		
Labour hold		Swing	▲1.9	

=== Stairfoot ===
Stairfoot
Party	Candidate	Votes	%	±%
Labour	Paul Murray	1,073	61.5	▲17.4
Conservative	Alex Wilkinson	392	22.5	▲8.6
Liberal Democrats	James Kitching	281	16.1	▲10.9
Majority		681	39.0	
Rejected ballots		19	1.1	
Turnout		1,765	19.8	
Registered electors		8,923		
Labour gain from Barnsley Ind.		Swing	▲4.4	

=== Wombwell ===
Wombwell
Party	Candidate	Votes	%	±%
Labour	Brenda Eastwood	1,426	69.5	▲3.9
Reform	Donna Cutts	235	11.4	N/A
Conservative	Debbie Toon	233	11.3	▼2.6
Liberal Democrats	Robert Green	159	7.7	▼3.3
Majority		1,191	58.0	
Rejected ballots		6	0.3	
Turnout		2,060	21.0	
Registered electors		9,815		
Labour hold		Swing	▲3.2	

=== Worsbrough ===
Worsbrough
Party	Candidate	Votes	%	±%
Independent	Jake Lodge	1,135	55.7	N/A
Labour	Sherry Holling	633	31.1	▼14.4
Conservative	Adrian Thompson	128	6.3	▼5.1
Liberal Democrats	Sarah Calvert	84	4.1	▼2.5
Green	Katelyn Long	57	2.8	N/A
Majority		502	24.6	
Rejected ballots		5	0.2	
Turnout		2,044	27.8	
Registered electors		7,351		
Independent hold		Swing	▼4.7	

== Changes 2023–2024 ==
- November 2023: Mat Crisp (Liberal Democrat, Darton East; elected in 2021) resigned as a councillor after Barnsley Council closed two town-centre bars operated by his company over unpaid rent arrears; the seat remained vacant until the 2024 election.
- December 2023: Pooja Ramchandani (Labour, Kingstone; elected in 2021) resigned; the seat remained vacant until the 2024 election.
