= 2019 Barnsley Metropolitan Borough Council election =

2019 UK local government election

The 2019 Barnsley Metropolitan Borough Council election took place on 2 May 2019 to elect members of Barnsley Metropolitan Borough Council in England. This was on the same day as other local elections.

== Result ==
2019 Barnsley Metropolitan Borough Council election
Party	This election				Full council			This election		
Party	Candidates	Seats	Net	Seats %	Other	Total	Total %	Votes	Votes %	+/−
Labour	{{{candidates}}}	12	▼7	57.1	37	49	77.8	15,691	34.9	–24.0
Liberal Democrats	{{{candidates}}}	3	▲3	14.3	1	4	6.3	7,591	16.9	+7.1
Conservative	{{{candidates}}}	1	▼1	4.8	2	3	4.8	5,729	12.8	–5.3
Barnsley Ind.	{{{candidates}}}	1	▲1	4.8	2	3	4.8	2,059	4.6	+1.4
Independent	{{{candidates}}}	2	▲2	9.5	0	2	3.2	4,094	9.1	+7.2
Democrats and Veterans	{{{candidates}}}	2	▲2	9.5	0	2	3.2	2,476	5.5	+3.8
Green	{{{candidates}}}	0	Steady	0.0	0	0	0.0	2,342	5.2	+1.4
UKIP	{{{candidates}}}	0	Steady	0.0	0	0	0.0	1,893	4.2	New
Yorkshire	{{{candidates}}}	0	Steady	0.0	0	0	0.0	1,557	3.5	+1.8
English Democrat	{{{candidates}}}	0	Steady	0.0	0	0	0.0	1,445	3.2	+2.7
Socialist	{{{candidates}}}	0	Steady	0.0	0	0	0.0	56	0.1	New

== Ward results ==
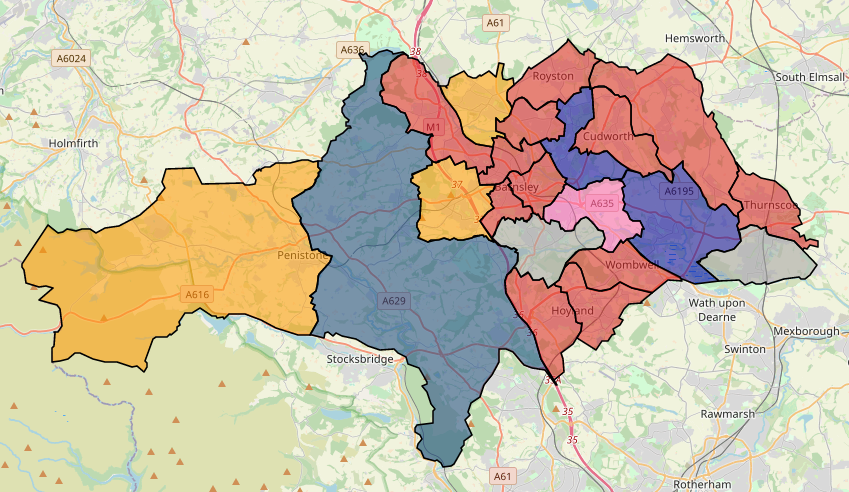
Map of the results of the election by electoral ward.

=== Central ward ===
Central
Party	Candidate	Votes	%	±%
Labour	Martin Dyson	750	44.2	▼23.8
Green	Chris Scarfe	474	28.0	▲18.4
Conservative	Adrian Thompson	289	17.1	▼0.1
Liberal Democrats	Connor Audsley	182	10.7	▲5.5
Majority		276	16.3	▼34.6
Labour hold		Swing		

=== Cudworth ward ===
Cudworth
Party	Candidate	Votes	%	±%
Labour	Charlie Wraith	933	61.7	▼13.0
Liberal Democrats	John Ellis-Mourant	340	22.5	▲19.5
Conservative	Mark Brook	240	15.9	▲5.5
Majority		593	39.2	▼25.1
Labour hold		Swing		

=== Darfield ward ===
Darfield
Party	Candidate	Votes	%	±%
Democrats and Veterans	Trevor Smith	750	38.1	▲18.4
Labour	Dorothy Coates	666	33.8	▼23.5
Liberal Democrats	Kim Boon	198	10.1	▲2.0
English Democrat	Maxine Spencer	191	9.7	N/A
Conservative	Delia Weldon	165	8.4	▼6.5
Majority		84	4.3	N/A
Democrats and Veterans gain from Labour		Swing		

=== Darton East ward ===
Darton East
Party	Candidate	Votes	%	±%
Liberal Democrats	Steve Hunt	1,832	70.5	▲53.1
Labour	Martin Flack	570	21.9	▼41.7
Conservative	Debbie Toon	197	7.6	▼11.4
Majority		1,262	48.6	N/A
Liberal Democrats gain from Labour		Swing		

=== Darton West ward ===
Darton West
Party	Candidate	Votes	%	±%
Labour	Trevor Cave	810	39.7	▼15.5
Green	Tom Heyes	499	24.5	▲10.5
Conservative	Lee Ogden	452	22.2	▼2.9
Liberal Democrats	Andrew Waters	277	13.6	▲7.9
Majority		311	15.3	▼14.9
Labour hold		Swing		

=== Dearne North ward ===
Dearne North
Party	Candidate	Votes	%	±%
Labour	Alan Gardiner	799	56.3	▼23.9
English Democrat	Janus Polenceusz	485	34.2	N/A
Conservative	Cicely Cowgill	134	9.4	▼10.4
Majority		314	22.1	▼38.3
Labour hold		Swing		

=== Dearne South ward ===
Dearne South
Party	Candidate	Votes	%	±%
Independent	Sam Danforth	1,173	51.7	N/A
Labour	Graham Jarvis	801	35.3	▼39.5
English Democrat	Adrian Morgan	175	7.7	N/A
Conservative	David Hunter	119	5.2	▼10.2
Majority		372	16.4	N/A
Independent gain from Labour		Swing		

=== Dodworth ward ===
Dodworth
Party	Candidate	Votes	%	±%
Liberal Democrats	Peter Fielding	1,308	45.6	▲39.1
Labour	Richard Riggs	647	22.6	▼15.2
UKIP	Jonathan Hastelow	440	15.3	N/A
Yorkshire	Chris Burrows	260	9.1	N/A
Conservative	Adam Bromfield	212	7.4	▼11.4
Majority		661	23.1	N/A
Liberal Democrats gain from Labour		Swing		

=== Hoyland Milton ward ===
Hoyland Milton
Party	Candidate	Votes	%	±%
Labour	Tim Shepherd	982	44.0	▼27.7
UKIP	Daniel Simpson	701	31.4	N/A
Conservative	Donna Cutts	240	10.8	▼5.7
Liberal Democrats	Glenn Lawrence	173	7.8	▼3.0
English Democrat	Justin Saxton	134	6.0	N/A
Majority		281	12.6	▼42.6
Labour hold		Swing		

=== Kingstone ward ===
Kingstone
Party	Candidate	Votes	%	±%
Labour	Kevin Williams	609	37.2	▼26.1
Democrats and Veterans	Peter Doyle	490	29.9	N/A
Green	Peter Giles	252	15.4	N/A
Liberal Democrats	Elizabeth Waters	125	7.6	▼17.2
Conservative	John Miller	107	6.5	▼5.4
Socialist	Angela Waller	56	3.4	N/A
Majority		119	7.3	▼31.2
Labour hold		Swing		

=== Monk Bretton ward ===
Monk Bretton
Party	Candidate	Votes	%	±%
Democrats and Veterans	Victoria Felton	1,236	54.5	▲37.8
Labour	Margaret Sheard	660	29.1	▼33.2
Yorkshire	Ryan Williams	268	11.8	N/A
Conservative	George Hill	105	4.6	▼7.6
Majority		576	25.4	N/A
Democrats and Veterans gain from Labour		Swing		

=== North East ward ===
North East
Party	Candidate	Votes	%	±%
Labour	Anita Cherryholme	786	36.2	▼28.2
Independent	Raymond Archer	712	32.8	N/A
Yorkshire	Tony Devoy	467	21.5	▼5.8
Conservative	Sam Wilkinson	207	9.5	▲1.2
Majority		74	3.4	▼33.7
Labour hold		Swing		

=== Old Town ward ===
Old Town
Party	Candidate	Votes	%	±%
Labour	Jo Newing	720	35.1	▼19.7
Independent	Donald Wood	698	34.0	N/A
Green	Kate Raynor	259	12.6	N/A
Liberal Democrats	Kevin Bennett	191	9.3	▲1.7
Conservative	Clive Watkinson	185	9.0	▼6.2
Majority		22	1.1	▼31.3
Labour hold		Swing		

=== Penistone East ward ===
Penistone East
Party	Candidate	Votes	%	±%
Conservative	Paul Hand-Davis	1,359	39.4	▼11.1
Liberal Democrats	Sue Waters	929	26.9	▲17.6
Labour	Dave Webster	602	17.4	▼15.7
Yorkshire	Lee Goulding	562	16.3	N/A
Majority		430	12.5	▼4.9
Conservative hold		Swing		

=== Penistone West ward ===
Penistone West
Party	Candidate	Votes	%	±%
Liberal Democrats	David Greenhough	1,583	43.7	▼2.8
Conservative	Andrew Robert Millner	753	20.8	▼1.6
Independent	David Wood	563	15.6	N/A
Labour	Roy Bowser	465	12.8	▼12.9
Green	Richard Trotman	255	7.0	▲1.6
Majority		830	22.9	▲2.1
Liberal Democrats gain from Conservative		Swing		

=== Rockingham ward ===
Rockingham
Party	Candidate	Votes	%	±%
Labour	Chris Lamb	803	36.5	▼22.2
Barnsley Ind.	Steve Sylvester	588	26.7	N/A
English Democrat	Kevin Riddiough	274	12.5	▲1.4
Conservative	Michael Davies	244	11.1	▼13.7
Green	Benjamin Holland	202	9.2	N/A
Liberal Democrats	Paul Nugent	88	4.0	▼1.4
Majority		215	9.8	▼24.1
Labour hold		Swing		

=== Royston ward ===
Royston
Party	Candidate	Votes	%	±%
Labour	Pauline McCarthy	953	49.4	▼19.7
UKIP	Kirk Harper	752	39.0	N/A
Conservative	Alex Wilkinson	225	11.7	▼0.1
Majority		201	10.4	▼39.6
Labour hold		Swing		

=== St Helen's ward ===
St Helen's
Party	Candidate	Votes	%	±%
Labour	Jenny Platts	901	61.3	▼15.4
Green	Alan Jones	401	27.3	▲15.8
Conservative	Jacob Griffin	169	11.5	▼0.3
Majority		500	34.0	▼30.9
Labour hold		Swing		

=== Stairfoot ward ===
Stairfoot
Party	Candidate	Votes	%	±%
Barnsley Ind.	Andy Gillis	1,057	53.9	▲27.3
Labour	Karen Dyson	702	35.8	▼24.1
Conservative	Elizabeth Hill	121	6.2	▼7.3
Liberal Democrats	James Kitching	82	4.2	N/A
Majority		355	18.1	N/A
Barnsley Ind. gain from Labour		Swing		

=== Wombwell ward ===
Wombwell
Party	Candidate	Votes	%	±%
Labour	Brenda Eastwood	907	54.4	▼13.1
Barnsley Ind.	Sharon Gillis	414	24.8	N/A
English Democrat	Jon Seymour	186	11.2	N/A
Liberal Democrats	Susan Mary Rose	136	8.2	N/A
Conservative	Gareth Thompson	25	1.5	▼19.0
Majority		493	29.6	▼17.4
Labour hold		Swing		

=== Worsbrough ward ===
Worsbrough
Party	Candidate	Votes	%	±%
Independent	Jake Lodge	948	49.9	N/A
Labour	Roya Pourali	625	32.9	▼29.9
Conservative	Michael Barraclough	181	9.5	▼11.1
Liberal Democrats	Sarah Calvert	147	7.7	▼8.9
Majority		323	17.0	▲N/A
Independent hold		Swing		

== Changes 2019–2021 ==
- November 2019: Victoria Felton (Monk Bretton), elected for the Democrats and Veterans Party, left the party to sit as an independent and stood for The Brexit Party in Barnsley Central at the December 2019 general election.
- October 2020: Trevor Smith (Darfield), elected for the Democrats and Veterans Party, joined the Labour Party.
