= 2012 Barnsley Metropolitan Borough Council election =

2012 UK local government election

- 3 May 2012

21 of 63 seats to Barnsley Metropolitan Borough Council 32 seats needed for a majority
	First party	Second party	Third party
Party	Labour	Barnsley Ind.	Conservative
Seats won	52	6	5
Seat change	▲9	▼7	▼1
Popular vote	29,368	10,268	5,633
Percentage	56.5%	19.8%	10.8%
Swing	▲3.2%	▼0.6%	▼4.5%
	Fourth party
Party	Independent
Seats won	0
Seat change	▼1
Popular vote	1,528
Percentage	2.9%
Swing	▲1.8%
Council control before election
Labour Party (UK)
Council control after election
Labour Party (UK)

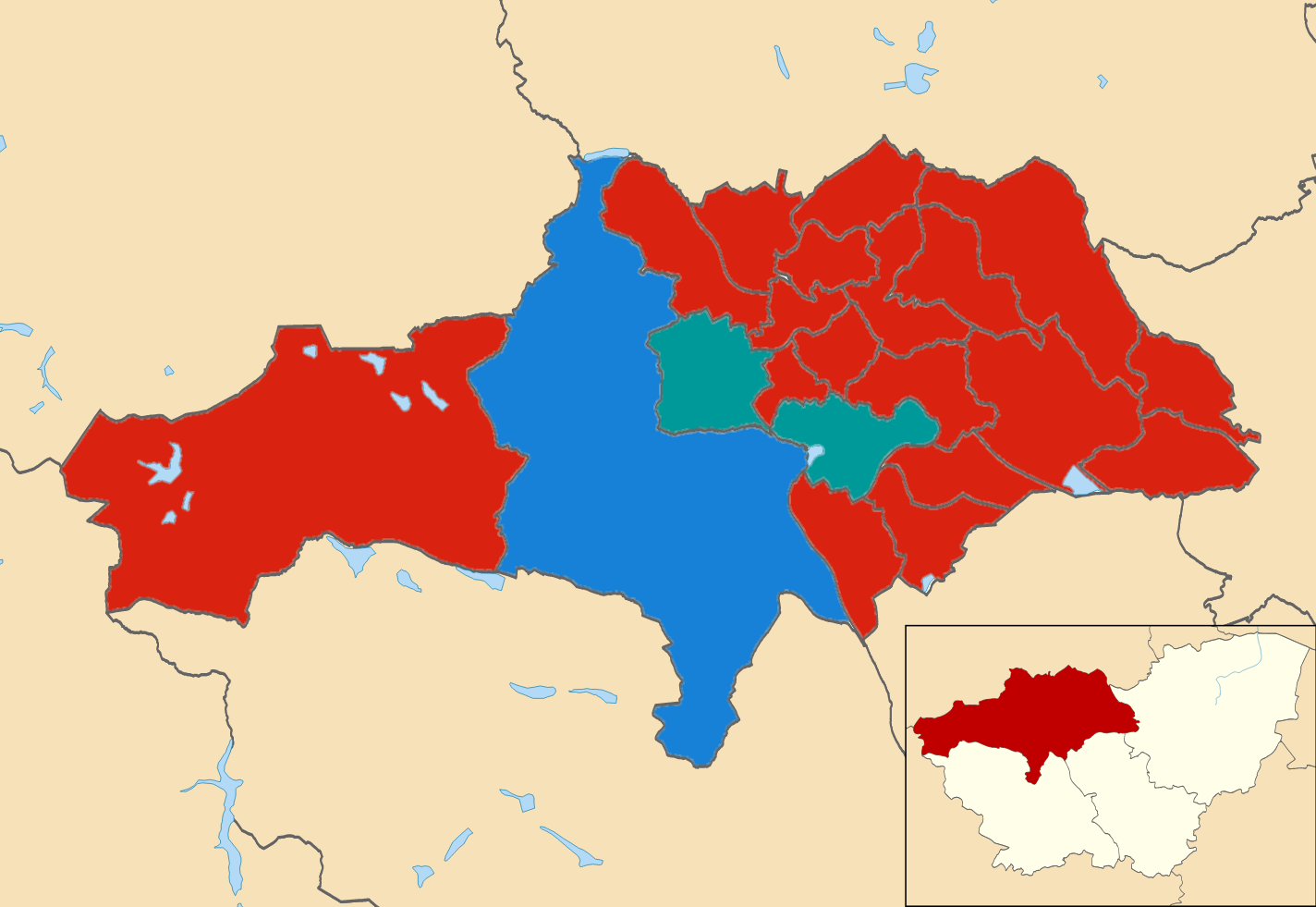
2012 local election results in Barnsley

The 2012 Barnsley Metropolitan Borough Council election took place on 3 May 2012 to elect members of Barnsley Metropolitan Borough Council in South Yorkshire, England. One third of the council was up for election.

== Overall Results ==
Barnsley local election result 2012
Party	Seats	Gains	Losses	Net gain/loss	Seats %	Votes %	Votes	+/−
Labour	18	9	0	+9	85.7	56.5	29,368	+3.2
Barnsley Ind.	2	0	7	-7	9.5	19.8	10,268	-0.6
Conservative	1	0	1	-1	4.8	10.8	5,633	-4.5
English Democrat	0	0	0	0	0.0	5.0	2,609	+4.5
Independent	0	0	1	-1	0.0	2.9	1,528	+1.8
UKIP	0	0	0	0	0.0	2.3	1,171	+0.9
BNP	0	0	0	0	0.0	1.6	839	-5.6
Liberal Democrats	0	0	0	0	0.0	0.5	248	+0.1
Socialist Labour	0	0	0	0	0.0	0.4	184	+0.1
TUSC	0	0	0	0	0.0	0.2	125	0.0

- +/- figure compared to 2011 result.

== Ward results ==
=== Central Ward ===
Central
Party	Candidate	Votes	%	±%
Labour	Douglas Birkinshaw	1,262	62.4	+31.4
Independent	Dave Gibson	347	17.1	−9.3
English Democrat	Colin Porter	286	14.1	N/A
Conservative	Anne Haynes	129	6.4	−1.7
Majority		915	45.0	+40.6
Turnout		2,024		
Labour hold		Swing		

=== Cudworth Ward ===
Cudworth
Party	Candidate	Votes	%	±%
Labour	Steve Houghton	1,684	70.5	+21.6
BNP	Terry Hubbard	244	10.2	−14.7
UKIP	Gill Wright	220	9.2	N/A
Conservative	Anne Campbell	124	5.2	−1.8
English Democrat	Carol Stacey	115	4.8	N/A
Majority		1,440	60.3	+36.3
Turnout		2,387		
Labour hold		Swing		

=== Darfield Ward ===
Darfield
Party	Candidate	Votes	%	±%
Labour	Caroline Saunders	1,142	46.6	+26.7
Barnsley Ind.	Carmen Hancock	984	40.2	−16.6
English Democrat	David Burnett	209	8.5	N/A
Conservative	George Hill	115	4.7	−6.3
Majority		1,120	45.7	
Turnout		2,450		
Labour gain from Barnsley Ind.		Swing		

=== Darton East Ward ===
Darton East
Party	Candidate	Votes	%	±%
Labour	Lesley Duerden	1,172	45.8	+11.3
Barnsley Ind.	Sharon Love	910	35.6	N/A
Conservative	Howard Pearson	234	9.1	−7.1
English Democrat	Sharon Sutton	185	7.2	N/A
Liberal Democrats	Ben Wilson	58	2.3	−5.0
Majority		262		
Turnout		2,559		
Labour hold		Swing	+	

=== Darton West Ward ===
Darton West
Party	Candidate	Votes	%	±%
Labour	Alice Cave	1,608	61.8	+27.3
English Democrat	Ian Sutton	505	19.4	N/A
Conservative	Sam England	488	18.8	+2.6
Majority		1,103	42.4	+30.0
Turnout				
Labour hold		Swing		

=== Dearne North Ward ===
Dearne North
Party	Candidate	Votes	%	±%
Labour	Jennifer Worton	1,314	69.1	+28.9
Barnsley Ind.	Ian Garner	501	26.3	+8.6
Conservative	Jonathan Robinson	87	4.6	−4.2
Majority		813		
Turnout		1,902		
Labour hold		Swing		

=== Dearne South Ward ===
Dearne South
Party	Candidate	Votes	%	±%
Labour	Sharron Brook	1,848	82.5	+48.7
Barnsley Ind.	Susan Garner	277	12.4	N/A
Conservative	Paul Buckley	114	5.1	−0.2
Majority		1,571		
Turnout		2,239		
Labour hold		Swing		

=== Dodworth Ward ===
Dodworth
Party	Candidate	Votes	%	±%
Barnsley Ind.	Phillip Birkinshaw	1,396	48.9	+0.2
Labour	Tony Wright	1,165	40.8	+20.8
Conservative	Andrew Barr	292	10.2	−5.2
Majority		231		
Turnout		2,893		
Barnsley Ind. hold		Swing		

=== Hoyland Milton Ward ===
Hoyland Milton
Party	Candidate	Votes	%	±%
Labour	Mick Stowe	1,524	56.2	+6.9
Barnsley Ind.	Damion Krska	635	23.4	−9.1
English Democrat	Justin Saxton	243	9.0	+0.2
Conservative	Elizabeth Hill	183	6.8	−2.7
TUSC	Brian Caton	125	4.6	N/A
Majority		889	32.8	
Turnout		2,710		
Labour gain from Barnsley Ind.		Swing		

=== Kingstone Ward ===
Kingstone
Party	Candidate	Votes	%	±%
Labour	Donna Green	1,099		
Barnsley Ind.	Geoff Bowden	458		
English Democrat	Nathan Walker	120		
BNP	Danny Cooke	116		
Conservative	Clive Watkinson	94		
Majority				
Turnout				
Labour gain from Barnsley Ind.		Swing		

=== Monk Bretton Ward ===
Monk Bretton
Party	Candidate	Votes	%	±%
Labour	Steve Green	1,398		
Independent	Grace Brown	719		
BNP	Jane Hubbard	286		
Conservative	Chris Pilkington	116		
Majority				
Turnout				
Labour gain from Independent		Swing		

=== North East Ward ===
North East
Party	Candidate	Votes	%	±%
Labour	Jeff Ennis	1,625		
Barnsley Ind.	Stella Milner	1,250		
Conservative	Peter Murray	137		
Majority				
Turnout				
Labour gain from Barnsley Ind.		Swing		

=== Old Town Ward ===
Old Town
Party	Candidate	Votes	%	±%
Labour	Phil Davies	1,391		
Barnsley Ind.	Clive Pickering	665		
Independent	Donald Wood	214		
English Democrat	David Peace	206		
Conservative	Howard Oldfield	182		
Majority				
Turnout				
Labour gain from Barnsley Ind.		Swing		

=== Penistone East Ward ===
Penistone East
Party	Candidate	Votes	%	±%
Conservative	John Wilson	1,405		
Labour	Jill Hayler	1,298		
UKIP	Glynis Heathcote	629		
Majority				
Turnout				
Conservative hold		Swing		

=== Penistone West Ward ===
Penistone West
Party	Candidate	Votes	%	±%
Labour	Peter Starling	1,389		
Conservative	Steve Webber	1,337		
Liberal Democrats	Robert Teal	190		
Majority				
Turnout				
Labour gain from Conservative		Swing		

=== Rockingham Ward ===
Rockingham
Party	Candidate	Votes	%	±%
Labour	Emma Dures	1,611		
Barnsley Ind.	Steve Sylvester	774		
English Democrat	Kevin Riddiough	253		
Conservative	Mike Toon	168		
Majority				
Turnout				
Labour gain from Barnsley Ind.		Swing		

=== Royston Ward ===
Royston
Party	Candidate	Votes	%	±%
Labour	Graham Kyte	1,573		
UKIP	Jim Johnson	322		
Independent	Edward Gouthwaite	248		
Conservative	Gill Milner	117		
English Democrat	Paul Robinson	73		
Majority				
Turnout				
Labour hold		Swing		

=== St Helen's Ward ===
St. Helen's
Party	Candidate	Votes	%	±%
Labour	Sarah Tattersall	1,387		
English Democrat	Dean Walker	222		
Conservative	Lesley Watkinson	85		
Majority				
Turnout				
Labour hold		Swing		

=== Stairfoot Ward ===
Stairfoot
Party	Candidate	Votes	%	±%
Labour	Wayne Johnson	1,140	46.1	+17.8
Barnsley Ind.	Fred Clowery	981	39.7	−9.1
BNP	Sandra Baker	193	7.8	−6.2
Conservative	Delia Weldon	102	4.1	−4.9
Socialist Labour	Frank Watson	58	2.3	N/A
Majority		159		
Turnout		2,474		
Labour gain from Barnsley Ind.		Swing		

=== Wombwell Ward ===
Wombwell
Party	Candidate	Votes	%	±%
Labour	Margaret Morgan	1,769		
Barnsley Ind.	Trevor Smith	329		
English Democrat	Gary Carnell	192		
Conservative	Alex Wilkinson	124		
Majority				
Turnout				
Labour hold		Swing		

=== Worsbrough Ward ===
Worsbrough
Party	Candidate	Votes	%	±%
Barnsley Ind.	Gill Carr	1,108		
Labour	Kevin Williams	969		
Socialist Labour	Terry Robinson	126		
Conservative	Helen Smith	124		
Majority				
Turnout				
Barnsley Ind. hold		Swing		

== By-elections between 2012 and 2014 ==
Royston by-election 10 October 2013
Party	Candidate	Votes	%	±%
Labour	Caroline Makinson	1,143	67.4	+0.0
UKIP	James Johnson	393	23.2	+9.4
Conservative	Paul Buckley	100	5.9	+0.9
English Democrat	Justin Saxton	32	1.9	−1.2
BNP	Mark Baker	28	1.7	+1.7
Majority		750	44.2	−9.4
Turnout		1,696	20.1	
Labour hold		Swing	-4.7	
