= 2018 Barnsley Metropolitan Borough Council election =

2018 local election in England

Map showing the results of the 2018 Barnsley Metropolitan Borough Council election

The 2018 Barnsley Metropolitan Borough Council election took place on 3 May 2018 to elect members of Barnsley Metropolitan Borough Council in England. This was on the same day as other local elections.

== Results summary ==
2018 Barnsley Metropolitan Borough Council election result
Party	Candidates						Votes		
Party	Stood	Elected	Gained	Unseated	Net	% of total	%	No.	Net %
Labour	21	19	2	1	▲1	90.4	58.9	26,151	▲2.3
Conservative	21	1	0	0	Steady	4.7	18.1	8,068	▲3.1
Liberal Democrats	14	1	1	0	▲1	4.7	9.8	4,380	New
Green	9	0	0	0	Steady	0.0	3.8	1,695	▲0.3
Barnsley Ind.	2	0	0	2	▼2	0.0	3.2	1,454	▼7.3
Independent	2	0	0	0	Steady	0.0	1.9	857	▼2.7
Democrats and Veterans	3	0	0	0	Steady	0.0	1.7	771	New
Yorkshire	2	0	0	0	Steady	0.0	1.7	754	▲0.4
English Democrat	1	0	0	0	Steady	0.0	0.5	235	▼0.7
Totals	93	21				100.0	100.0	44,365	▼2,251

== Ward results ==
=== Central ward ===
Central
Party	Candidate	Votes	%	±%
Labour	Margaret Bruff	1,285	68.0	▲6.7
Conservative	Adrian Thompson	324	17.2	▲6.7
Green	Rene Van Buuren	182	9.6	▲1.3
Liberal Democrats	Connor Audsley	98	5.2	N/A
Majority		961	50.8	▲6.1
Labour hold		Swing		

=== Cudworth ward ===
Cudworth
Party	Candidate	Votes	%	±%
Labour	Joe Hayward	1,252	74.7	▼0.5
Conservative	Samuel Wilkinson	175	10.4	▲3.1
Yorkshire	Chris Burrows	161	9.6	▼7.9
Liberal Democrats	Elizabeth Waters	50	3.0	N/A
Democrats and Veterans	Gavin Felton	38	2.3	N/A
Majority		1,077	64.3	▼3.4
Labour hold		Swing		

=== Darfield ward ===
Darfield
Party	Candidate	Votes	%	±%
Labour	Pauline Markham	1,134	57.3	▲7.5
Democrats and Veterans	Trevor Smith	391	19.7	N/A
Conservative	Delia Weldon	295	14.9	▼6.1
Liberal Democrats	Kim Boon	160	8.1	N/A
Majority		743	37.6	▲29.2
Labour hold		Swing		

=== Darton East ward ===
Darton East
Party	Candidate	Votes	%	±%
Labour	Harry Spence	1,523	63.6	▲24.1
Conservative	George Hill	455	19.0	▲9.7
Liberal Democrats	Steve Hunt	415	17.4	N/A
Majority		1,068	44.6	▲36.5
Labour hold		Swing		

=== Darton West ward ===
Darton West
Party	Candidate	Votes	%	±%
Labour	Sharon Howard	1,279	55.2	▼14.1
Conservative	Lee Ogden	581	25.1	▼5.6
Green	Tom Heyes	324	14.0	N/A
Liberal Democrats	Andrew Waters	132	5.7	N/A
Majority		698	30.1	▼8.5
Labour hold		Swing		

=== Dearne North ward ===
Dearne North
Party	Candidate	Votes	%	±%
Labour	Annette Gollick	1,107	80.2	▼6.4
Conservative	Joseph Farnfield	273	19.8	▲6.4
Majority		834	60.4	▼12.8
Labour hold		Swing		

=== Dearne South ward ===
Dearne South
Party	Candidate	Votes	%	±%
Labour	May Noble	1,415	74.8	▲0.3
Conservative	Sharon Jackson	292	15.4	▲9.5
Green	Sara Lewis	184	9.8	N/A
Majority		1,123	59.4	▼4.5
Labour hold		Swing		

=== Dodworth ward ===
Dodworth
Party	Candidate	Votes	%	±%
Labour	Neil Wright	956	37.8	▲11.8
Barnsley Ind.	Jack Carr	933	36.9	▼17.6
Conservative	Debbie Toon	476	18.8	▲8.2
Liberal Democrats	Susan Waters	164	6.5	N/A
Majority		23	0.9	▼27.6
Labour gain from Barnsley Ind.		Swing		

=== Hoyland Milton ward ===
Hoyland Milton
Party	Candidate	Votes	%	±%
Labour	Robin Franklin	1,548	71.7	▲13.8
Conservative	Michael Payne	356	16.5	▲8.4
Liberal Democrats	Glenn Lawrence	255	11.8	N/A
Majority		1,192	55.2	▲22.2
Labour hold		Swing		

=== Kingstone ward ===
Kingstone
Party	Candidate	Votes	%	±%
Labour	Kath Mitchell	1,078	63.3	▲3.4
Liberal Democrats	John Ellis-Maurant	423	24.8	N/A
Conservative	Lesley Watkinson	202	11.9	▼0.4
Majority		655	38.5	▼9.1
Labour hold		Swing		

=== Monk Bretton ward ===
Monk Bretton
Party	Candidate	Votes	%	±%
Labour	Kenneth Richardson	1,279	62.3	▼9.3
Democrats and Veterans	Vicky Felton	342	16.7	N/A
Conservative	Adam Bromfield	250	12.2	▼2.5
Green	Dean Todd	119	5.8	N/A
Liberal Democrats	Susan Rose	63	3.0	N/A
Majority		937	45.6	▼11.3
Labour hold		Swing		

=== North East ward ===
North East
Party	Candidate	Votes	%	±%
Labour	Dorothy Higginbottom	1,397	64.4	▲12.9
Yorkshire	Tony Devoy	593	27.3	▲15.7
Conservative	Elizabeth Hill	179	8.3	▲2.5
Majority		804	37.1	▲16.8
Labour hold		Swing		

=== Old Town ward ===
Old Town
Party	Candidate	Votes	%	±%
Labour	Clive Pickering	1,206	54.8	▲11.8
Independent	Mark Houchin	493	22.4	N/A
Conservative	Clive Watkinson	334	15.2	▲7.8
Liberal Democrats	Kevin Bennett	166	7.6	N/A
Majority		713	32.4	▲31.0
Labour gain from Barnsley Ind.		Swing		

=== Penistone East ward ===
Penistone East
Party	Candidate	Votes	%	±%
Conservative	Robert Barnard	1,813	50.5	▲0.7
Labour	Martin Flack	1,189	33.1	▼4.6
Liberal Democrats	David Greenhough	332	9.3	N/A
Green	Kate Raynor	255	7.1	▼5.4
Majority		624	17.4	▲5.3
Conservative hold		Swing		

=== Penistone West ward ===
Penistone West
Party	Candidate	Votes	%	±%
Liberal Democrats	Hannah Kitching	1,741	46.5	N/A
Labour	Jo Newing	963	25.7	▼13.7
Conservative	Alex Wilkinson	840	22.4	▼5.0
Green	Richard Trotman	204	5.4	▼3.5
Majority		778	20.8	▲8.8
Liberal Democrats gain from Labour		Swing		

=== Rockingham ward ===
Rockingham
Party	Candidate	Votes	%	±%
Labour	James Andrews	1,242	58.7	▲7.1
Conservative	Michael Davies	524	24.8	▲16.4
English Democrat	Kevin Riddiough	235	11.1	▲6.1
Liberal Democrats	Paul Nugent	115	5.4	N/A
Majority		718	33.9	▲14.8
Labour hold		Swing		

=== Royston ward ===
Royston
Party	Candidate	Votes	%	±%
Labour	Tim Cheetham	1,315	69.1	▲5.2
Independent	Edward Gouthwaite	364	19.1	▼2.9
Conservative	Michael Toon	224	11.8	▲1.3
Majority		951	50.0	▲8.1
Labour hold		Swing		

=== St Helen's ward ===
St Helen's
Party	Candidate	Votes	%	±%
Labour	Dave Leech	1,238	76.7	▲11.4
Conservative	Steven Burkinshaw	190	11.8	▲7.8
Green	Alan Jones	187	11.5	▲7.5
Majority		1,048	64.9	▲21.6
Labour hold		Swing		

=== Stairfoot ward ===
Stairfoot
Party	Candidate	Votes	%	±%
Labour	Janine Bowler	1,173	59.9	▼19.5
Barnsley Ind.	Andy Gillis	521	26.6	N/A
Conservative	Mark Brook	265	13.5	▼7.1
Majority		652	33.3	▼25.5
Labour hold		Swing		

=== Wombwell ward ===
Wombwell
Party	Candidate	Votes	%	±%
Labour	Robert Frost	1,363	67.5	▼13.6
Conservative	Joe Colville	415	20.5	▲1.6
Green	Terence Cook	240	12.0	N/A
Majority		948	47.0	▼15.2
Labour hold		Swing		

=== Worsbrough ward ===
Worsbrough
Party	Candidate	Votes	%	±%
Labour	John Clarke	1,209	62.8	▲20.3
Conservative	Michael Barraclough	331	20.6	▲14.7
Liberal Democrats	Sarah Calvert	266	16.6	N/A
Majority		878	42.2	▲38.2
Labour hold		Swing		

== By-elections between 2018 and 2019 ==
Old Town by-election 12 July 2018
Party	Candidate	Votes	%	±%
Labour	Jo Newing	548	44.2	−10.6
Democrats and Veterans	Gavin Felton	338	27.3	+27.3
Conservative	Clive Watkinson	157	12.7	−2.5
Liberal Democrats	Kevin Bennett	124	10.0	+2.5
Yorkshire	Tony Devoy	47	3.8	+3.8
BNP	Christopher Houston	25	2.0	+2.0
Majority		210	16.9	
Turnout		1,239		
Labour hold		Swing		
