= 2021 Barnsley Metropolitan Borough Council election =

2021 UK local government election

- 6 May 2021

One third (21) of 63 seats on the Barnsley Metropolitan Borough Council 32 seats needed for a majority
Party	Labour	Liberal Democrats	Conservative
Last election	19 seats, 58.9%	1 seat, 9.8%	3 seats, 18.1%
Current seats	48	4	3
Seats needed	Steady	▲28	▲29
Party	Democrats and Veterans	Independent
Last election	0 seats, 1.7%	0 seats, 1.9%
Current seats	0	4
Seats needed	▲32	Steady
- Map showing the results of the 2021 Barnsley Metropolitan Borough Council election
Incumbent council control
Majority administration
Labour

The 2021 Barnsley Metropolitan Borough Council election took place on 6 May 2021 to elect members of Barnsley Metropolitan Borough Council in England. It took place on the same day as other local elections. The election was originally due to take place in May 2020, but was postponed due to the COVID-19 pandemic.

== Results summary ==
2021 Barnsley Metropolitan Borough Council election
Party	This election			Full council			This election		
Party	Seats	Net	Seats %	Other	Total	Total %	Votes	Votes %	+/−
Labour	17	▼1	81.0	32	49	76.6	19,309	40.4	+5.5
Liberal Democrats	3	▲3	14.3	4	7	10.9	5,623	11.8	-5.1
Conservative	1	Steady	4.8	2	3	4.7	11,975	25.1	+12.3
Independent	0	Steady	0.0	3	3	3.1	1,122	2.3	-6.8
Barnsley Ind.	0	▼2	0.0	1	1	1.6	5,041	10.6	+6.0
Green	0	Steady	0.0	0	0	0.0	3,152	6.6	+1.4
SDP	0	Steady	0.0	0	0	0.0	461	1.0	New
English Democrat	0	Steady	0.0	0	0	0.0	339	0.7	-2.5
Yorkshire	0	Steady	0.0	0	0	0.0	233	0.5	-3.0
TUSC	0	Steady	0.0	0	0	0.0	182	0.4	New
Reform	0	Steady	0.0	0	0	0.0	166	0.3	New
For Britain	0	Steady	0.0	0	0	0.0	98	0.2	New
Keep Equality Safe	0	Steady	0.0	0	0	0.0	75	0.2	New

== Ward results ==
=== Central ward ===
Central
Party	Candidate	Votes	%	±%
Labour	Summer Risebury	964	48.9	+4.7
Conservative	Adrian Thompson	529	26.8	+9.7
Green	Ian Guest	366	18.6	−9.4
Liberal Democrats	Catherine Rogerson	113	5.7	−5.0
Majority		435	22.1	
Turnout		1,989	23.87	
Registered electors		8,373		
Rejected ballots		17	0.9	
Labour hold		Swing		

=== Cudworth ward ===
Cudworth
Party	Candidate	Votes	%	±%
Labour	Steve Houghton	1,368	66.9	+5.2
Conservative	Mark Brook	316	15.5	−0.4
Barnsley Ind.	Mark Arnold	285	13.9	N/A
Liberal Democrats	Elizabeth Waters	75	3.7	−18.8
Majority		1,052		
Turnout		1,973	23.84	
Total votes				
Registered electors		8,307		
Rejected ballots		8	0.4	
Labour hold		Swing		

=== Darfield ward ===
Darfield
Party	Candidate	Votes	%	±%
Labour	Kevin Osborne	1,166	50.0	+16.2
Conservative	Benjamin Harrison	600	25.7	+17.3
Barnsley Ind.	Victoria Semley	372	15.9	N/A
For Britain	Graham Stringer	98	4.2	N/A
Liberal Democrats	Kevin Bennett	77	3.3	−6.8
Independent	Kris Tonkinson	21	0.9	N/A
Majority				
Turnout		2,346	29.15	
Registered electors		8,069		
Rejected ballots		12	0.5	
Labour hold		Swing		

=== Darton East ward ===
Darton East
Party	Candidate	Votes	%	±%
Liberal Democrats	Mat Crisp	1,119	38.8	−31.7
Labour	Dave Webster	722	25.0	+3.1
Barnsley Ind.	Sharon Love	587	20.3	N/A
Conservative	John Miller	323	11.2	+3.6
Green	Kirsty Mcara-Marsh	135	4.7	N/A
Majority				
Turnout		2,893	32.70	
Registered electors		8,869		
Rejected ballots		7	0.2	
Liberal Democrats gain from Labour		Swing	14.1	

=== Darton West ward ===
Darton West
Party	Candidate	Votes	%	±%
Labour	Alice Cave	1,051	37.5	−2.2
Conservative	Marie Bates	914	32.6	+10.4
Green	Tom Heyes	755	26.9	+2.4
Liberal Democrats	Andrew Waters	85	3.0	−10.6
Majority				
Turnout		2,825	32.25	
Registered electors		8,768		
Rejected ballots		20	0.7	
Labour hold		Swing		

=== Dearne North ward ===
Dearne North
Party	Candidate	Votes	%	±%
Labour	Wendy Cain	1,052	61.1	+4.8
Conservative	George Hill	412	23.9	+14.5
English Democrat	Maxine Spencer	162	9.4	−24.8
Liberal Democrats	Simon Hulme	49	2.8	N/A
SDP	Savannah Jarvis	47	2.7	N/A
Majority				
Turnout		1,741	21.35	
Registered electors		8,187		
Rejected ballots		19	1.1	
Labour hold		Swing		

=== Dearne South ward ===
Dearne South
Party	Candidate	Votes	%	±%
Labour	Dorothy Coates	1,364	60.2	+24.9
Conservative	Jacob Griffin	398	17.6	+12.4
SDP	David Jarvis	359	15.8	N/A
English Democrat	Janus Polenceusz	74	3.3	−4.4
Liberal Democrats	Linda Fielding	70	3.1	N/A
Majority				
Turnout		2,291	23.99	
Registered electors		9,169		
Rejected ballots		26	1.1	
Labour hold		Swing		

=== Dodworth ward ===
Dodworth
Party	Candidate	Votes	%	±%
Liberal Democrats	Chris Wray	804	26.2	−19.4
Barnsley Ind.	Phillip Birkinshaw	757	24.7	N/A
Labour	Emma Johnson-Henshaw	677	22.1	−0.5
Conservative	Lee Ogden	651	21.2	+13.8
Green	Rebecca Trotman	178	5.8	N/A
Majority				
Turnout		2,990	35.23	
Registered electors		8,487		
Rejected ballots		14	0.5	
Liberal Democrats gain from Barnsley Ind.		Swing	16.9	

=== Hoyland Milton ward ===
Hoyland Milton
Party	Candidate	Votes	%	±%
Labour	James Stowe	1,153	39.6	−4.4
Conservative	David White	1,040	35.7	+24.9
Independent	Daniel Simpson	331	11.4	−20.0
Green	John Evans	232	8.0	N/A
Liberal Democrats	Glenn Lawrence	99	3.4	−5.4
TUSC	Angela Waller	60	2.1	N/A
Majority				
Turnout		2,937	31.34	
Registered electors		9,374		
Rejected ballots		19	0.6	
Labour hold		Swing		

=== Kingstone ward ===
Kingstone
Party	Candidate	Votes	%	±%
Labour	Pooja Ramchandani	699	38.1	+0.9
Barnsley Ind.	Peter Doyle	396	21.6	−8.3
Conservative	Ian Levitt-Smillie	310	16.9	+10.4
Green	Peter Giles	181	9.9	−5.5
Liberal Democrats	Philip Wright	123	6.7	−0.9
Independent	Carlo Turner	85	4.6	N/A
TUSC	Tracey-Ann Holland	41	2.2	N/A
Majority				
Turnout		1,846	23.84	
Registered electors		7,769		
Rejected ballots		11	0.6	
Labour hold		Swing		

=== Monk Bretton ward ===
Monk Bretton
Party	Candidate	Votes	%	±%
Labour	Steve Green	1,260	54.6	+25.5
Conservative	Michael Toon	486	21.0	+16.4
Barnsley Ind.	Gary McNair	415	18.0	N/A
Green	Chris Scarfe	102	4.4	N/A
Liberal Democrats	Matthew Nicholson	46	2.0	N/A
Majority				
Turnout		2,314	25.94	
Registered electors		8,953		
Rejected ballots		5	0.2	
Labour hold		Swing		

=== North East ward ===
North East
Party	Candidate	Votes	%	±%
Labour	Jeff Ennis	1,268	49.2	+13.0
Barnsley Ind.	Raymond Archer	746	28.9	−3.9
Conservative	Samuel Wilkinson	498	19.3	+9.8
Liberal Democrats	Sam Christmas	65	2.5	N/A
Majority				
Turnout		2,587	25.40	
Registered electors		10,214		
Rejected ballots		10	0.4	
Labour hold		Swing		

=== Old Town ward ===
Old Town
Party	Candidate	Votes	%	±%
Labour	Phil Lofts	1,084	43.1	+8.0
Conservative	Clive Watkinson	578	23.0	+14.0
Barnsley Ind.	Liam Hardcastle	390	15.5	N/A
Green	Gillian Nixon	203	8.1	−4.5
Independent	Donald Wood	124	4.9	−29.1
Liberal Democrats	Will Fielding	112	4.4	−4.9
TUSC	Estelle Mageean	26	1.0	N/A
Majority				
Turnout		2,528	29.48	
Registered electors		8,593		
Rejected ballots		9	0.4	
Labour hold		Swing		

=== Penistone East ward ===
Penistone East
Party	Candidate	Votes	%	±%
Conservative	John Wilson	1,954	45.6	+6.2
Liberal Democrats	Susan Waters	1,034	24.1	−2.8
Labour	Alex Burnett	988	23.1	+5.7
Green	Kate Raynor	309	7.2	N/A
Majority				
Turnout		4,311	44.69	
Registered electors		9,651		
Rejected ballots		25	0.6	
Conservative hold		Swing		

=== Penistone West ward ===
Penistone West
Party	Candidate	Votes	%	±%
Liberal Democrats	Mandy Lowe-Flello	1,444	37.4	−6.3
Conservative	Martin Bancroft	1,172	30.3	+9.5
Labour	Sarah Grainger	745	19.3	+6.5
Green	Richard Trotman	338	8.7	+1.7
Reform	Edward Dillingham	166	4.3	N/A
Majority				
Turnout		3,874	38.48	
Registered electors		10,059		
Rejected ballots		9	0.2	
Liberal Democrats gain from Labour		Swing	14.1	

=== Rockingham ward ===
Rockingham
Party	Candidate	Votes	%	±%
Labour	Nicola Sumner	1,084	39.1	−10.8
Conservative	Roy Garratt	1,084	39.1	+23.2
Green	James Grinham	289	10.4	+0.7
Liberal Democrats	Paul Nugent	124	4.5	N/A
TUSC	Karen Fletcher	115	4.2	N/A
Keep Equality Safe	Andy Belk	75	2.7	N/A
Majority		0	0.0	
Turnout		2,771	33.3	
Registered electors		8,321		
Rejected ballots		11	0.4	
Labour hold		Swing		

Note: Nicola Sumner and Roy Garratt tied with 1,084 votes each. Sumner won the seat following a coin toss.

Nicola Sumner won on the toss of a coin. In the result this is shown as her winning an extra vote.

=== Royston ward ===
Royston
Party	Candidate	Votes	%	±%
Labour	Caroline Makinson	1,034	43.5	−5.9
Barnsley Ind.	Kirk Harper	700	29.5	−9.5
Conservative	Michael Davies	422	17.8	+6.1
Independent	Neil Fisher	95	4.0	N/A
Green	Simon Layton	78	3.3	N/A
Liberal Democrats	Patrick Smith	46	1.9	N/A
Majority				
Turnout		2,379	27.39	
Registered electors		8,713		
Rejected ballots		8	0.3	
Labour hold		Swing		

=== St Helen's ward ===
St Helen's
Party	Candidate	Votes	%	±%
Labour	Sarah Tattersall	983	56.9	−4.4
Conservative	Donna Cutts	330	19.1	+7.6
Yorkshire	Mick Chambers	233	13.5	N/A
Green	Alan Jones	91	5.3	−22.0
Liberal Democrats	Sarah Booth	52	3.0	N/A
SDP	Steve Vajda	38	2.2	N/A
Majority				
Turnout		1,736	21.89	
Registered electors		7,946		
Rejected ballots		9	0.5	
Labour hold		Swing		

=== Stairfoot ward ===
Stairfoot
Party	Candidate	Votes	%	±%
Labour	Karen Dyson	895	38.0	+2.2
Independent	Wayne Johnson	689	29.3	N/A
Barnsley Ind.	Kay Thewlis	364	15.5	−38.4
Conservative	Elizabeth Hill	363	15.4	+9.2
Liberal Democrats	James Kitching	42	1.8	−2.4
Majority				
Turnout		2,360	26.0	
Registered electors		9,111		
Rejected ballots		7	0.3	
Labour hold		Swing		

=== Wombwell ward ===
Wombwell
Party	Candidate	Votes	%	±%
Labour	James Higginbottom	1,346	55.4	+1.0
Conservative	Alex Wilkinson	648	26.7	+25.2
Green	Simon Kusners	127	5.2	N/A
Independent	Amy Stewart	108	4.4	N/A
English Democrat	Jon Seymour	103	4.2	−7.0
Liberal Democrats	Susan Rose	79	3.3	−4.9
SDP	Rachel Thompson	17	0.7	N/A
Majority				
Turnout		2,443	25.43	
Registered electors		9,673		
Rejected ballots		15	0.6	
Labour hold		Swing		

=== Worsbrough ward ===
Worsbrough
Party	Candidate	Votes	%	±%
Labour	Roy Bowser	827	37.3	+4.4
Barnsley Ind.	Gillian Carr	775	35.0	N/A
Conservative	Michael Barraclough	485	21.9	+12.4
Liberal Democrats	Sarah Calvert	129	5.8	−1.9
Majority				
Turnout		2,232	29.56	
Registered electors		7,557		
Rejected ballots		18	0.8	
Labour gain from Barnsley Ind.		Swing	3.1	
