= Stephen Houghton =

English politician (born 1958)

Sir Stephen Geoffrey Houghton CBE (born 27 April 1958) is an English Labour Party politician and former leader of Barnsley Metropolitan Borough Council.

== Political career ==
Houghton was first elected as a councillor to Barnsley Metropolitan Borough Council in 1988, and became Leader of the Council and Chair of Cabinet in 1996. He served continuously as leader of the council until 2026, when Labour lost its majority on the council to Reform UK.

He is also a member of the Barnsley North East Area Council and are also appointed to the following outside bodies: Captain Allotts Charity, Cudworth United Charities, Inclusive Economy Board, Leeds City Region Partnership Committee, Local Government Association (LGA) - General Assembly, Migration Yorkshire (Chair), Sheffield City Region Combined Authority, Sheffield City Region Local Enterprise Partnership Board, Special Interest Group of Municipal Authorities (SIGOMA), and South Yorkshire Leaders' Meeting.

In 1999, Houghton became Chair of the Special Interest Group of Municipal Authorities within the LGA.

== Education ==
Houghton graduated from Birmingham University with an MSc in Local Governance in 2004.

== Honours ==
Houghton was appointed a Commander of the Order of the British Empire (CBE) for services to Local Government in the 2004 New Year Honours. Houghton was appointed a Knight Bachelor in the 2013 Birthday Honours for parliamentary and political services.
