= Barnsley Metropolitan Borough Council =

Local government body in England

Type
- Type: Metropolitan borough council

History
- Founded: 1 April 1974

Leadership
- Mayor: Liam Hardcastle, Reform UK since 29 May 2026
- Leader: William Brown, Reform UK since 29 May 2026
- Chief Executive: Sarah Norman since July 2019

Structure
- Seats: 63 councillors
- Graph of the party split among 63 seats.
- Political groups: Administration (41) Reform (41) Other parties (22) Labour (12) Liberal Democrats (8) Independent (2)
- Joint committees: South Yorkshire Mayoral Combined Authority
- Length of term: 4 years

Elections
- Voting system: Plurality-at-large
- Last election: 7 May 2026
- Next election: 2 May 2030

Meeting place
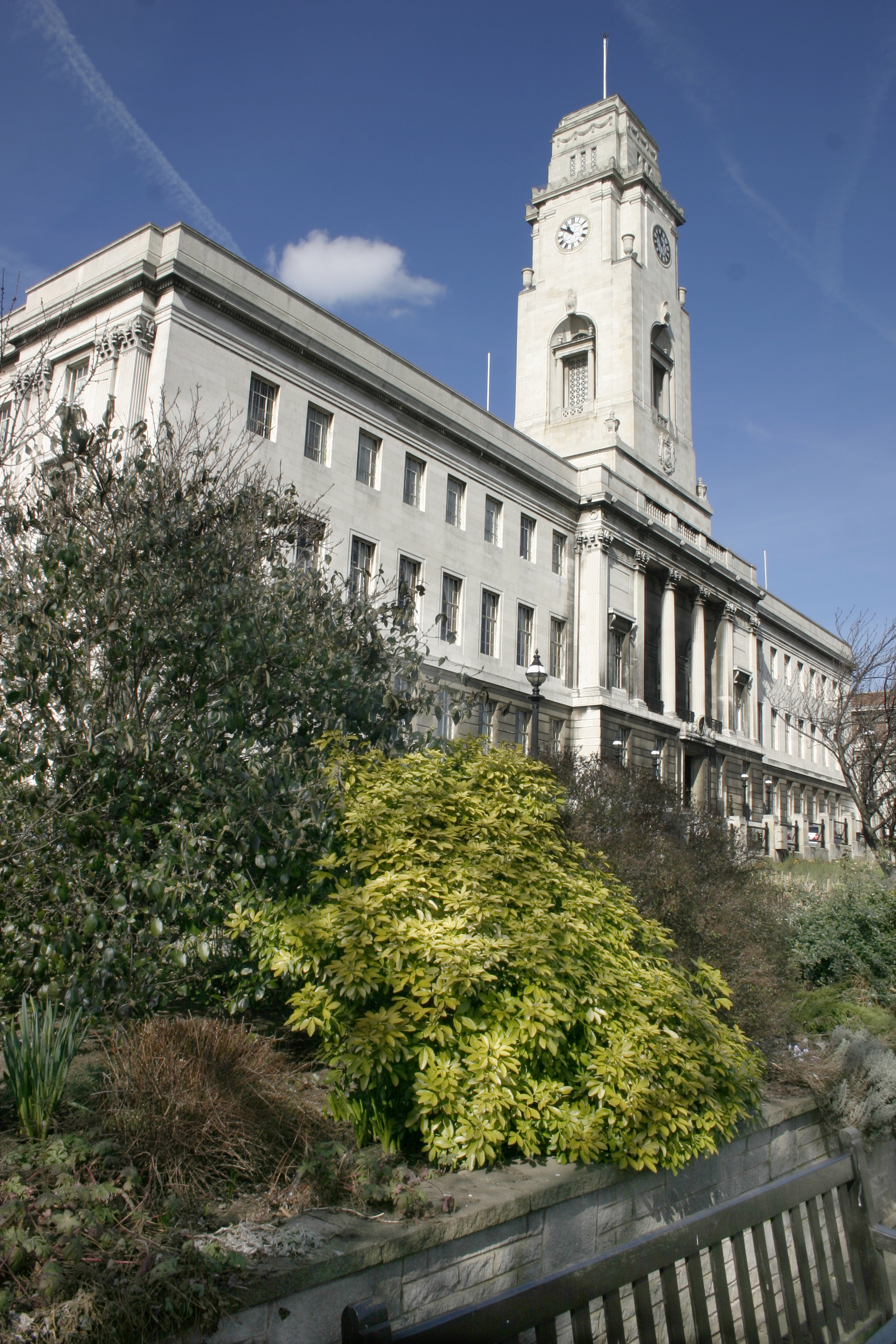
- Town Hall, Church Street, Barnsley, S70 2TA

Website
- www.barnsley.gov.uk

Barnsley Metropolitan Borough Council is the local authority of the Metropolitan Borough of Barnsley in South Yorkshire, England. It is a metropolitan borough council and provides the majority of local government services in the borough. The council is a member of the South Yorkshire Mayoral Combined Authority.

The council has been under Reform UK majority control since the 2026 election. Prior to that, the council had been under Labour majority control from the creation of the modern borough in 1974. Council meetings are held at Barnsley Town Hall, and the council's main offices are in the adjoining Westgate Plaza One building.

== History ==
The first elected council for the town of Barnsley was a local board of health established in 1853. This replaced a body of improvement commissioners which had been set up to administer the town in 1822. The local board in turn was replaced in 1869 when the town was made a municipal borough. In 1913 the borough was elevated to county borough status, making it independent from West Riding County Council.

The current metropolitan borough of Barnsley was created on 1 April 1974 under the Local Government Act 1972. It covered the former county borough of Barnsley plus parts of 13 other districts, which were all abolished at the same time. The enlarged Barnsley district was awarded borough status from its creation, allowing the chair of the council to take the title of mayor, continuing Barnsley's series of mayors dating back to 1869.

The Metropolitan Borough of Barnsley was initially a district-level authority, with South Yorkshire County Council providing county-level services. However, the metropolitan county councils, including South Yorkshire County Council, were abolished in 1986 under the Local Government Act 1985. Since 1986 Barnsley Metropolitan Borough Council has therefore been responsible for most local government functions.

Since 2014 the council has been a constituent member of the South Yorkshire Mayoral Combined Authority (called the Sheffield City Region until 2021), led by the directly-elected Mayor of South Yorkshire since 2018.

== Governance ==
=== Political control ===
The council has been under Reform UK majority control since the 2026 election.

The first election to the reconstituted borough council was held in 1973, initially operating as a shadow authority alongside the outgoing authorities until the new arrangements came into force on 1 April 1974. Labour held a majority of the seats on the council from its creation until the 2026 election.

Party in control	Years
Labour	1974–2026
Reform	2026–present

=== Leadership ===
The role of mayor is largely ceremonial in Barnsley. Political leadership is provided by the leader of the council. The leaders since 1974 have been:

Councillor	Party	From	To
Brian Varley	Labour	1974	1975
Ron Fisher	Labour	Feb 1975	May 1975
Ron Rigby	Labour	May 1975	1976
Fred Lunn	Labour	1976	11 Dec 1984
Ron Rigby	Labour	1985	1988
Hedley Salt	Labour	1988	1995
Jeff Ennis	Labour	1995	1996
Stephen Houghton	Labour	1996	May 2026
William Brown	Reform	29 May 2026	present

=== Composition ===
Following the 2026 election, and a subsequent by-election in August 2026, the composition of the council was:

Party	Seats
Reform	41
Labour	12
Liberal Democrats	8
Independent	2
Total	63

The next election is due in 2030.

== Premises ==
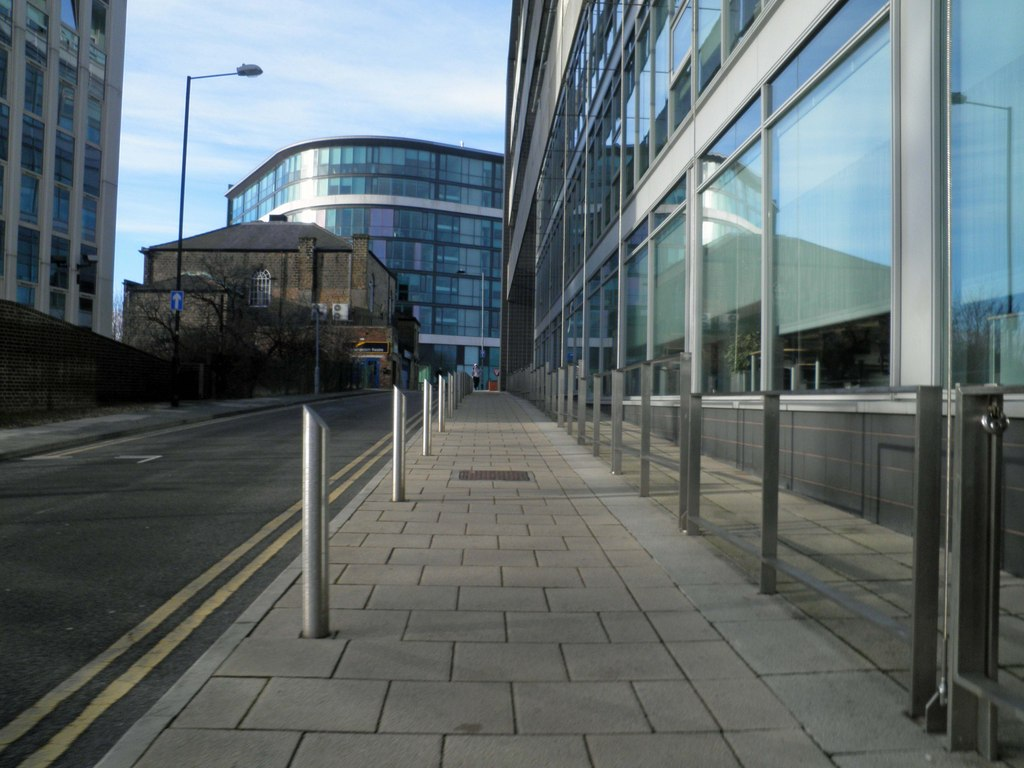
Westgate Plaza One (on the right)

Council meetings are held at Barnsley Town Hall on Church Street, which had been completed in 1933 for the old borough council. In 2007 the council moved most office staff to a new building called Westgate Plaza One on Westgate, just west of the Town Hall.

== Elections ==
Since the last ward boundary changes in 2025, the council has comprised 63 councillors representing 21 wards, with each ward electing three councillors to sit for a four year term. Elections are held every four years, with all seats contested, following a council decision in 2025 to replace the previous policy of 1/3 of seats (one per ward) being elected per year for 3 years, with the 4th year having no elections.
