= 1978 Barnsley Metropolitan Borough Council election =

1978 local election in England

← 1976	4 May 1978	1979 →

One third of seats (20 of 60) to Barnsley Metropolitan Borough Council 31 seats needed for a majority
	First party	Second party	Third party
Party	Labour	Residents	Independent
Seats won	16	3	1
Seat change	▼2	▲3	Steady
Majority party before election
Labour
Majority party after election
Labour

Elections to Barnsley Metropolitan Borough Council were held on 4 May 1978. One-third of the council was up for election. The election resulted in Labour retaining control of the council. The sole Democratic Labour councillor elected in 1973 successfully defended his seat as an Independent, while the only Independent elected that year was unable to defend his seat as a Conservative.

== Election result ==
Barnsley Metropolitan Borough Council Election Result 1978
Party	Seats	Gains	Losses	Net gain/loss	Seats %	Votes %	Votes	+/−
Labour	16	0	2	-2	80.0	51.0	28,584	+3.0
Residents	3	3	0	+3	15.0	31.0	17,383	+0.9
Independent	1	0	0	0	5.0	4.6	2,567	+4.1
Conservative	0	0	1	-1	0.0	9.1	5,116	+0.5
Liberal	0	0	0	0	0.0	4.3	2,379	-7.2

This resulted in the following composition of the council:

Party	Previous council	New council
Labour	39	37
Residents	11	14
Liberals	5	5
Independent Labour	2	2
Independent	1	1
Conservatives	2	1
Total	60	60
Working majority	18	14

== Ward results ==
+/- figures represent changes from the last time these wards were contested.

Ardsley (7424)
Party	Candidate	Votes	%	±%
Labour	Hepworth R.	1,295	55.7	+3.7
Residents	Parkin A. Ms.	758	32.6	−3.7
Conservative	Kitching A.	273	11.7	+0.0
Majority		537	23.1	+7.4
Turnout		2,326	31.3	+1.9
Labour hold		Swing	+3.7	

No. 1 (Barnsley: Carlton) (10226)
Party	Candidate	Votes	%	±%
Labour	Brain H.*	1,892	72.0	+4.0
Residents	Roughley J.	735	28.0	−4.0
Majority		1,157	44.0	+7.9
Turnout		2,627	25.7	+1.9
Labour hold		Swing	+4.0	

No. 2 (Barnsley: East & North) (8250)
Party	Candidate	Votes	%	±%
Labour	Williams A.*	1,471	42.7	−2.5
Residents	Harris M.	1,444	41.9	+1.2
Conservative	Guest M.	529	15.4	+1.3
Majority		27	0.8	−3.7
Turnout		3,444	41.7	−1.1
Labour hold		Swing	-1.8	

No. 3 (Barnsley: Central-South-South East)(9433)
Party	Candidate	Votes	%	±%
Labour	Lunn F.*	2,435	71.0	+21.8
Residents	Welbourne E. Ms.	536	15.6	+1.9
Conservative	Oldfield H.	458	13.4	+4.2
Majority		1,899	55.4	+34.0
Turnout		3,429	36.4	−1.0
Labour hold		Swing	+9.9	

No. 4 (Barnsley: South West and West) (7650)
Party	Candidate	Votes	%	±%
Residents	Addison M. Ms.	1,517	54.6	+1.9
Labour	Almond B.	960	34.6	−2.2
Conservative	Moorhouse J.	301	10.8	+0.3
Majority		557	20.1	+4.1
Turnout		2,778	36.3	−8.3
Residents gain from Labour		Swing	+2.0	

No. 5 (Barnsley: Monk Bretton) (11006)
Party	Candidate	Votes	%	±%
Labour	Stokes M.	2,024	55.7	+5.6
Residents	French W.	1,610	44.3	+5.1
Majority		414	11.4	+0.5
Turnout		3,634	33.0	−1.3
Labour hold		Swing	+0.2	

No. 7 (Cudworth) (6477)
Party	Candidate	Votes	%	±%
Labour	Salt H.	1,574	54.4	+11.3
Residents	Saxby J.	1,317	45.6	−11.3
Majority		257	8.9	−4.7
Turnout		2,891	44.6	+6.1
Labour hold		Swing	+11.3	

No. 8 (Darfield) (6210)
Party	Candidate	Votes	%	±%
Labour	Dixon T.	1,445	55.4	−8.0
Residents	Sykes E.	1,165	44.6	+8.0
Majority		280	10.7	−16.0
Turnout		2,610	42.0	−1.2
Labour hold		Swing	-8.0	

No. 9 (Dodworth-Barugh-Higham-Gawber)(6948)
Party	Candidate	Votes	%	±%
Labour	Mason G.*	1,453	54.5	+12.2
Residents	Taylor S.	1,211	45.5	+9.3
Majority		242	9.1	+2.9
Turnout		2,664	38.3	−6.6
Labour hold		Swing	+1.4	

No. 10 (Darton) (9483)
Party	Candidate	Votes	%	±%
Labour	Booth D.*	1,611	43.9	−2.8
Residents	Skelton G.	1,567	42.7	−10.5
Conservative	England G.	491	13.4	+13.4
Majority		44	1.2	−5.3
Turnout		3,669	38.7	+2.3
Labour hold		Swing	+3.8	

No. 11 (Dearne: Central & South) (9977)
Party	Candidate	Votes	%	±%
Labour	Bedford J.*	Unopposed	N/A	N/A
Labour hold		Swing	N/A	

No. 12 (Dearne: East & West) (7367)
Party	Candidate	Votes	%	±%
Labour	Oldham J.*	Unopposed	N/A	N/A
Labour hold		Swing	N/A	

No. 13 (Hoyland Nether) (11479)
Party	Candidate	Votes	%	±%
Independent	Eaden D.	2,525	57.5	+57.5
Labour	Wadsworth A.	1,868	42.5	−15.8
Majority		657	15.0	−1.6
Turnout		4,393	38.3	−2.7
Independent hold		Swing	+36.6	

No. 14 (Penistone) (6472)
Party	Candidate	Votes	%	±%
Residents	Harrison M. Ms.	1,150	35.1	+33.2
Conservative	Gledhill W.*	1,105	33.8	+22.9
Labour	Murphy W.	778	23.8	−0.5
Liberal	Stein W.	241	7.4	−28.9
Majority		45	1.4	−8.2
Turnout		3,274	50.6	−7.0
Residents gain from Conservative		Swing	+5.1	

No. 15 (Royston) (6522)
Party	Candidate	Votes	%	±%
Labour	Ball T.*	1,367	58.4	+0.8
Liberal	Whitehead E.	973	41.6	+4.9
Majority		394	16.8	−4.2
Turnout		2,340	35.9	−9.0
Labour hold		Swing	-2.0	

No. 16 (Wombwell: Central-North-South East)(5381)
Party	Candidate	Votes	%	±%
Labour	Fellows B.*	898	57.7	+15.4
Liberal	Hargreaves E.	657	42.3	+42.3
Majority		241	15.5	+0.3
Turnout		1,555	28.9	+3.1
Labour hold		Swing	-13.4	

No. 17 (Wombwell: Hemingfield and SouthWest) (7551)
Party	Candidate	Votes	%	±%
Labour	Wake J.	1,821	59.9	+15.5
Residents	Nield M. Ms.	1,217	40.1	+40.1
Majority		604	19.9	+8.9
Turnout		3,038	40.2	−1.1
Labour hold		Swing	-12.3	

No. 18 (Worsbrough) (11259)
Party	Candidate	Votes	%	±%
Residents	Dickinson F.	2,261	50.2	−2.8
Labour	Bland J.*	2,245	49.8	+2.8
Majority		16	0.4	−5.6
Turnout		4,506	40.0	+1.9
Residents gain from Labour		Swing	-2.8	

No. 19 (Hemsworth Rural) (9218)
Party	Candidate	Votes	%	±%
Labour	Wooley E.	1,805	59.4	+0.5
Residents	Hardman J.	895	29.5	+4.7
Conservative	Schofield D. Ms.	338	11.1	−5.2
Majority		910	30.0	−4.2
Turnout		3,038	33.0	−0.3
Labour hold		Swing	-2.1	

No. 20 (Penistone Rural & Wortley) (7541)
Party	Candidate	Votes	%	±%
Labour	Fish H.*	1,642	43.1	+12.9
Conservative	Tue G. Ms.	1,621	42.5	+8.4
Liberal	Nicholson M.	508	13.3	−22.3
Independent	Wilson M.	42	1.1	+1.1
Majority		21	0.6	−4.9
Turnout		3,813	50.6	−3.3
Labour hold		Swing	+2.2	
