= 1982 Barnsley Metropolitan Borough Council election =

1982 local election in England

← 1980	6 May 1982	1983 →

One third of seats (23 of 66) to Barnsley Metropolitan Borough Council 34 seats needed for a majority
	First party	Second party	Third party
Party	Labour	Alliance	Conservative
Seats won	19	2	1
Seat change	▲6	Steady	▼1
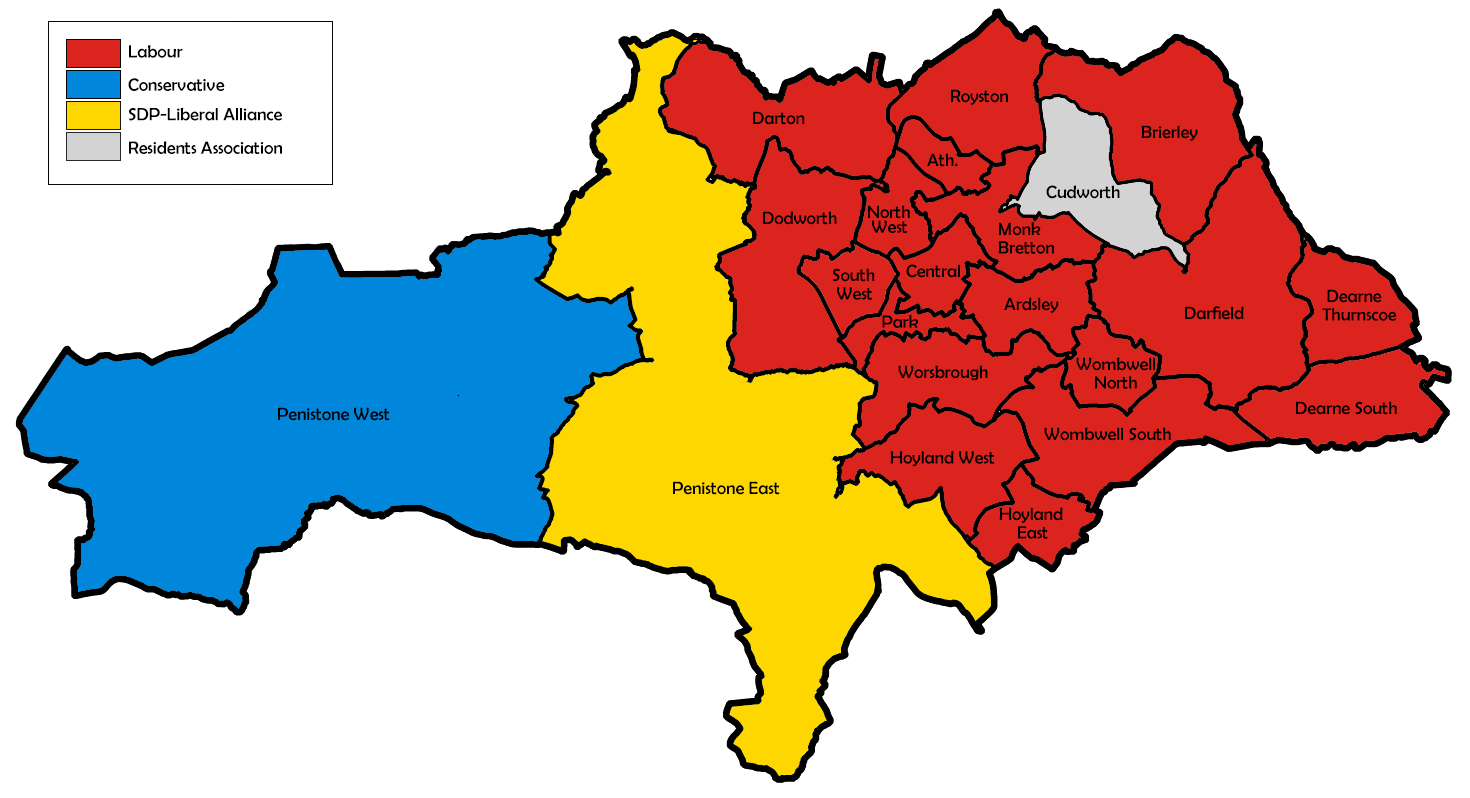
- Map showing the results of the 1982 Barnsley council elections.
Majority party before election
Labour
Majority party after election
Labour

Elections to Barnsley Metropolitan Borough Council were held on 6 May 1982, with one third of the council up for election with an additional vacancy in Royston. Prior to the election, Labour had gained a seat from Residents in a Dodsworth by-election, with another Residents councillor in Wombwell North defecting to the Labour grouping, offsetting a by-election loss in Penistone East to the recently formed SDP-Liberal Alliance. Alliance had also seen defections to them from the Independent Labour councillor in Hoyland East and the defending (formerly Residents) councillor in Darton.

== Election result ==
Barnsley Metropolitan Borough Council Election Result 1982
Party	Seats	Gains	Losses	Net gain/loss	Seats %	Votes %	Votes	+/−
Labour	19	6	0	+6	82.6	55.2	33,610	-3.8
Alliance	2	1	1	0	8.7	27.5	16,738	+24.9
Conservative	1	0	1	-1	4.3	8.9	5,392	+2.8
Residents	1	0	3	-3	4.3	6.5	3,941	-25.1
Independent Labour	0	0	2	-2	0.0	2.1	1,247	+1.6

This resulted in the following composition of the council:

Party	Previous council	New council
Labour	47	53
Residents	10	7
SDP–Liberal Alliance	4	4
Conservatives	3	2
Independent Labour	2	0
Total	66	66
Working majority	28	40

== Ward results ==
+/- figures represent changes from the last time these wards were contested.

Ardsley (7608)
Party	Candidate	Votes	%	±%
Labour	Shirt R.	1,330	64.8	+9.4
Alliance	French W.	426	20.8	+20.8
Conservative	Oldfield H.	296	14.4	+5.2
Majority		904	44.1	+24.0
Turnout		2,052	27.0	−3.7
Labour hold		Swing	-5.7	

Athersley (7219)
Party	Candidate	Votes	%	±%
Labour	Langford L.	1,420	79.6	−4.9
Alliance	Linstead M. Ms.	227	12.7	+12.7
Conservative	Sykes A.	138	7.7	+7.7
Majority		1,193	66.8	−2.1
Turnout		1,785	24.7	+0.2
Labour hold		Swing	-8.8	

Brierley (7400)
Party	Candidate	Votes	%	±%
Labour	Ennis J.	1,632	72.6	−11.1
Alliance	Mayes M.	392	17.4	+17.4
Conservative	Schofield D. Ms.	225	10.0	−6.4
Majority		1,240	55.1	−12.2
Turnout		2,249	30.4	+1.5
Labour hold		Swing	-14.2	

Central (8397)
Party	Candidate	Votes	%	±%
Labour	Wood J.	1,803	55.1	−1.1
Alliance	Taylor M. Ms.	1,087	33.2	+33.2
Conservative	Booth D.	380	11.6	+4.5
Majority		716	21.9	+2.3
Turnout		3,270	38.9	+4.2
Labour hold		Swing	-17.1	

Cudworth (7726)
Party	Candidate	Votes	%	±%
Residents	Wraith C.	1,331	48.0	+12.7
Labour	Welsh J.	1,243	44.8	−14.1
Alliance	Burton M. Ms.	200	7.2	+7.2
Majority		88	3.2	−20.5
Turnout		2,774	35.9	−2.7
Residents hold		Swing	+13.4	

Darfield (7993)
Party	Candidate	Votes	%	±%
Labour	Dixon T.	2,063	80.0	+15.4
Alliance	Birkbeck J.	517	20.0	+20.0
Majority		1,546	59.9	+30.8
Turnout		2,580	32.3	−2.1
Labour hold		Swing	-2.3	

Darton (8979)
Party	Candidate	Votes	%	±%
Labour	Driver J.	1,524	46.1	+0.5
Alliance	Evans J.	1,301	39.3	+37.0
Conservative	Slater A.	482	14.6	+7.2
Majority		223	6.7	−1.7
Turnout		3,307	36.8	−5.9
Labour gain from Alliance		Swing	-18.2	

Dearne South (9116)
Party	Candidate	Votes	%	±%
Labour	Ramsden D.	1,222	48.9	−41.4
Independent Labour	Gregory J.	1,046	41.9	+41.9
Alliance	Mulvany M.	231	9.2	+9.2
Majority		176	7.0	−73.6
Turnout		2,499	27.4	−2.4
Labour gain from Independent Labour		Swing	-41.6	

Dearne Thurnscoe (8597)
Party	Candidate	Votes	%	±%
Labour	Lloyd D.	1,915	72.6	N/A
Alliance	Hallam D.	722	27.4	N/A
Majority		1,193	45.2	N/A
Turnout		2,637	30.7	N/A
Labour hold		Swing	N/A	

Dodworth (8139)
Party	Candidate	Votes	%	±%
Labour	Herring J.	1,730	49.5	−4.1
Alliance	Chamberlain D.	1,074	30.8	+21.4
Residents	Whitmey C.	688	19.7	−13.8
Majority		656	18.8	−1.4
Turnout		3,492	42.9	−1.8
Labour gain from Residents		Swing	-12.7	

Hoyland East (7986)
Party	Candidate	Votes	%	±%
Alliance	Steer G.	1,696	59.2	+35.3
Labour	Levitt L.	1,167	40.8	−19.4
Majority		529	18.5	−17.8
Turnout		2,863	35.9	+1.5
Alliance hold		Swing	+27.3	

Hoyland West (6890)
Party	Candidate	Votes	%	±%
Labour	Hague D.	1,731	65.1	−2.2
Alliance	Lockwood C.	927	34.9	+34.9
Majority		804	30.2	−4.5
Turnout		2,658	38.6	−3.6
Labour hold		Swing	-18.5	

Monk Bretton (8916)
Party	Candidate	Votes	%	±%
Labour	Robinson R.	1,931	70.0	−0.6
Alliance	Major C.	473	17.2	+17.2
Conservative	White J.	354	12.8	+6.6
Majority		1,458	52.9	+5.4
Turnout		2,758	30.9	−2.5
Labour hold		Swing	-8.9	

North West (7739)
Party	Candidate	Votes	%	±%
Labour	Williams A.	1,505	48.3	−9.0
Alliance	Appleyard J. Ms.	799	25.7	+25.7
Conservative	Jubb M.	450	14.5	+14.5
Residents	Harris M. Ms.	360	11.6	−31.1
Majority		706	22.7	+8.1
Turnout		3,114	40.2	−2.3
Labour hold		Swing	-17.3	

Park (5985)
Party	Candidate	Votes	%	±%
Labour	Warden R.	1,506	67.1	−6.7
Alliance	Smailes J.	457	20.4	+12.8
Conservative	Rawson N.	280	12.5	+6.2
Majority		1,049	46.8	−14.7
Turnout		2,243	37.5	+7.8
Labour hold		Swing	-9.7	

Penistone East (6681)
Party	Candidate	Votes	%	±%
Alliance	Peach E. Ms.	949	32.2	+32.2
Conservative	Dews R.	916	31.1	−23.6
Labour	Banner K.	872	29.6	−15.7
Residents	Ryalls G.	208	7.1	+7.1
Majority		33	1.1	−8.4
Turnout		2,945	44.1	−1.6
Alliance gain from Conservative		Swing	+27.9	

Penistone West (7953)
Party	Candidate	Votes	%	±%
Conservative	Neville F. Ms.	1,147	34.8	+34.8
Residents	Harrison D.	913	27.7	−40.5
Labour	Morris A.	646	19.6	−3.4
Alliance	Stein W.	591	17.9	+9.4
Majority		234	7.1	−37.9
Turnout		3,297	41.5	−12.1
Conservative hold		Swing	+37.6	

Royston (8170)
Party	Candidate	Votes	%	±%
Labour	Rispin C.	2,258	70.8	+13.2
Labour	Lavender H.	1,865		
Alliance	Williamson J.	731	22.9	+22.9
Alliance	Smith A.	715		
Independent Labour	Jones H.	201	6.3	+6.3
Majority		1,527	47.9	+32.7
Turnout		3,190	39.0	+0.9
Labour hold		Swing		
Labour gain from Independent Labour		Swing	-4.8	

South West (7466)
Party	Candidate	Votes	%	±%
Labour	O'Rourke J.	1,179	38.2	−8.8
Alliance	Bickley K. Ms.	1,104	35.8	+35.8
Residents	Kent J.	441	14.3	−29.0
Conservative	England G.	363	11.8	+2.1
Majority		75	2.4	−1.3
Turnout		3,087	41.3	−1.8
Labour gain from Residents		Swing	-22.3	

Wombwell North (5474)
Party	Candidate	Votes	%	±%
Labour	Fellows B.	895	52.6	−9.2
Alliance	Calton W.	807	47.4	+47.4
Majority		88	5.2	−18.4
Turnout		1,702	31.1	+0.0
Labour hold		Swing	-28.3	

Wombwell South (7935)
Party	Candidate	Votes	%	±%
Labour	Naylor T.	1,645	63.3	−13.0
Alliance	Young S. Ms.	955	36.7	+36.7
Majority		690	26.5	−26.1
Turnout		2,600	32.8	+3.2
Labour hold		Swing	-24.8	

Worsbrough (8326)
Party	Candidate	Votes	%	±%
Labour	Bristowe T.	2,393	62.5	+3.9
Alliance	Ramsay R.	1,072	28.0	+28.0
Conservative	Pappworth R.	361	9.4	+5.3
Majority		1,321	34.5	+13.0
Turnout		3,826	46.0	−5.0
Labour gain from Residents		Swing	-12.0	
