= 1984 Barnsley Metropolitan Borough Council election =

1984 local election in England

← 1983	3 May 1984	1986 →

One third of seats (22 of 66) to Barnsley Metropolitan Borough Council 34 seats needed for a majority
	First party	Second party	Third party
Party	Labour	Conservative	Independent
Seats won	20	1	1
Seat change	Steady	Steady	▲1
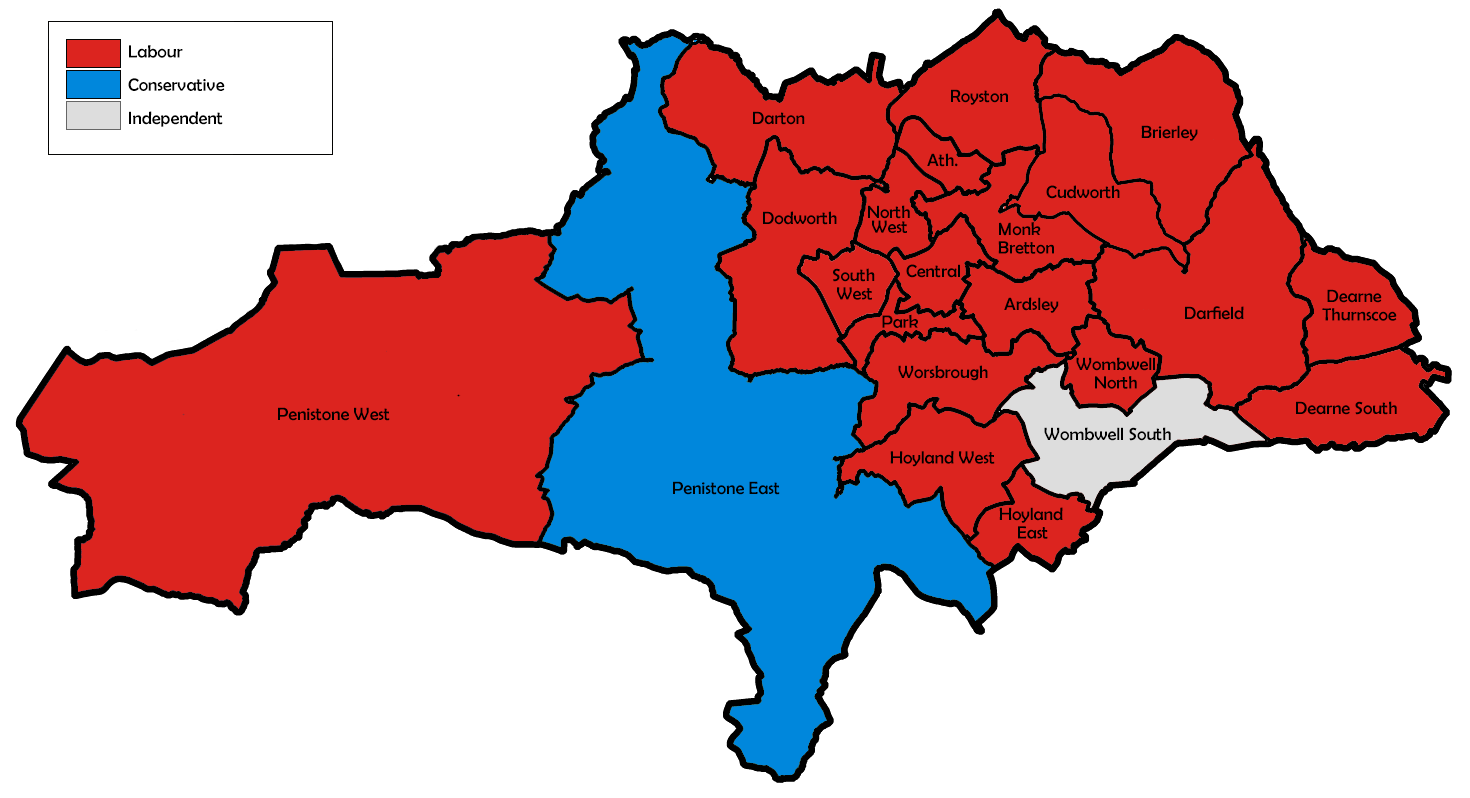
- Map showing the results of the 1984 Barnsley council elections.
Majority party before election
Labour
Majority party after election
Labour

Elections to Barnsley Metropolitan Borough Council were held on 3 May 1984, with one third of the council up for election. Prior to the election, a Residents councillor in Dudsworth had defected to Labour. The election resulted in Labour retaining control of the council.

== Election result ==
Barnsley Metropolitan Borough Council Election Result 1984
Party	Seats	Gains	Losses	Net gain/loss	Seats %	Votes %	Votes	+/−
Labour	20	1	1	0	90.9	70.3	45,729	+8.0
Conservative	1	0	0	0	4.5	10.1	6,586	+0.4
Independent	1	1	0	+1	4.5	3.1	2,020	+0.8
Alliance	0	0	0	0	0.0	12.1	7,842	-6.6
Residents	0	0	1	-1	0.0	2.8	1,847	-2.9
Independent Labour	0	0	0	0	0.0	1.6	1,062	+0.3

This resulted in the following composition of the council:

Party	Previous council	New council
Labour	59	59
Conservatives	3	3
SDP–Liberal Alliance	2	2
Residents	2	1
Independent	0	1
Total	66	66
Working majority	52	52

== Ward results ==
+/- figures represent changes from the last time these wards were contested.

Ardsley (7580)
Party	Candidate	Votes	%	±%
Labour	Wilson H.*	1,731	84.0	+7.7
Conservative	Cousins B.	330	16.0	−7.7
Majority		1,401	68.0	+15.5
Turnout		2,061	27.2	−0.5
Labour hold		Swing	+7.7	

Athersley (7158)
Party	Candidate	Votes	%	±%
Labour	Dancer H.*	1,964	88.1	+3.7
Alliance	Linstead M. Ms.	266	11.9	−3.7
Majority		1,698	76.1	+7.3
Turnout		2,230	31.2	+1.2
Labour hold		Swing	+3.7	

Brierley (7422)
Party	Candidate	Votes	%	±%
Labour	Harper M.	2,675	78.2	−5.3
Alliance	Hirst C. Ms.	319	9.3	+9.3
Conservative	Schofield D. Ms.	219	6.4	−10.1
Independent Labour	Vodden N.	209	6.1	+6.1
Majority		2,356	68.8	+1.9
Turnout		3,422	46.1	+11.9
Labour hold		Swing	-7.3	

Central (8530)
Party	Candidate	Votes	%	±%
Labour	Watts J. Ms.*	2,379	71.7	+12.2
Alliance	Major C.	678	20.4	−12.3
Conservative	Jubb M.	260	7.8	+0.1
Majority		1,701	51.3	+24.5
Turnout		3,317	38.9	−3.6
Labour hold		Swing	+12.2	

Cudworth (7882)
Party	Candidate	Votes	%	±%
Labour	Rigby R.*	2,277	81.8	+14.8
Alliance	Fairclough A. Ms.	506	18.2	+18.2
Majority		1,771	63.6	+29.6
Turnout		2,783	35.3	−3.5
Labour hold		Swing	-1.7	

Darfield (8017)
Party	Candidate	Votes	%	±%
Labour	Barlow E.*	2,699	91.8	+14.4
Conservative	Buck E.	240	8.2	+8.2
Majority		2,459	83.7	+28.8
Turnout		2,939	36.7	−0.4
Labour hold		Swing	+3.1	

Darton (9125)
Party	Candidate	Votes	%	±%
Labour	Ibbotson A.	2,497	64.4	+19.6
Alliance	Smith A.	907	23.4	−13.5
Conservative	Slater A.	473	12.2	+0.6
Majority		1,590	41.0	+33.2
Turnout		3,877	42.5	−2.0
Labour hold		Swing	+16.5	

Dearne South (8959)
Party	Candidate	Votes	%	±%
Labour	Whitehouse S.*	2,183	71.9	−6.8
Independent Labour	Gregory J.	853	28.1	+21.1
Majority		1,330	43.8	−13.5
Turnout		3,036	33.9	+0.4
Labour hold		Swing	-13.9	

Dearne Thurnscoe (8557)
Party	Candidate	Votes	%	±%
Labour	Young K.*	2,488	85.6	−0.5
Alliance	Burke M.	418	14.4	+0.5
Majority		2,070	71.2	−1.0
Turnout		2,906	34.0	+3.5
Labour hold		Swing	-0.5	

Dodworth (8404)
Party	Candidate	Votes	%	±%
Labour	Mason G.*	2,458	65.5	+3.3
Alliance	Hallam D.	851	22.7	−2.9
Conservative	Colquhoun G.	443	11.8	−0.4
Majority		1,607	42.8	+6.2
Turnout		3,752	44.6	−2.1
Labour hold		Swing	+3.1	

Hoyland East (7992)
Party	Candidate	Votes	%	±%
Labour	Beardshall P.*	2,013	74.2	+20.6
Alliance	Chantrey J.	700	25.8	−20.6
Majority		1,313	48.4	+41.2
Turnout		2,713	33.9	−4.1
Labour hold		Swing	+20.6	

Hoyland West (6858)
Party	Candidate	Votes	%	±%
Labour	Wroe C.*	2,144	76.0	+4.1
Alliance	Burd K.	678	24.0	−4.1
Majority		1,466	51.9	+8.2
Turnout		2,822	41.1	−3.3
Labour hold		Swing	+4.1	

Monk Bretton (9075)
Party	Candidate	Votes	%	±%
Labour	Sheard T.*	2,757	85.3	+7.7
Conservative	White J.	476	14.7	+0.9
Majority		2,281	70.6	+6.9
Turnout		3,233	35.6	+1.4
Labour hold		Swing	+3.4	

North West (7786)
Party	Candidate	Votes	%	±%
Labour	Wilde J.*	1,747	60.8	+4.9
Residents	Harris J.	716	24.9	+6.5
Conservative	Oldfield H.	410	14.3	−1.3
Majority		1,031	35.9	−1.6
Turnout		2,873	36.9	−4.2
Labour hold		Swing	-0.8	

Park (6052)
Party	Candidate	Votes	%	±%
Labour	Borrett K.*	1,763	79.5	+6.1
Alliance	Appleyard J. Ms.	250	11.3	+1.2
Conservative	Dews R.	206	9.3	−7.3
Majority		1,513	68.2	+11.4
Turnout		2,219	36.7	−7.7
Labour hold		Swing	+2.4	

Penistone East (6836)
Party	Candidate	Votes	%	±%
Conservative	Tue G. Ms.*	1,337	41.1	−3.5
Labour	Hunter D.	1,294	39.8	+3.8
Alliance	Hanstock O.	620	19.1	−0.4
Majority		43	1.3	−7.3
Turnout		3,251	47.6	−2.5
Conservative hold		Swing	-3.6	

Penistone West (8004)
Party	Candidate	Votes	%	±%
Labour	Collett N. Ms.	1,228	37.4	+16.3
Residents	Harrison D.	1,131	34.4	−15.9
Conservative	Papworth G. Ms.	925	28.2	+8.6
Majority		97	3.0	−26.2
Turnout		3,284	41.0	−8.9
Labour gain from Residents		Swing	+16.1	

Royston (8463)
Party	Candidate	Votes	%	±%
Labour	Newman W.	2,653	87.7	+10.3
Conservative	Wood P.	371	12.3	+12.3
Majority		2,282	75.5	+20.7
Turnout		3,024	35.7	+2.8
Labour hold		Swing	-1.0	

South West (7635)
Party	Candidate	Votes	%	±%
Labour	Goodyear B.	2,008	50.2	+7.1
Alliance	Bickley K. Ms.	1,649	41.2	+2.0
Conservative	Dobbin J.	341	8.5	−1.0
Majority		359	9.0	+5.1
Turnout		3,998	52.4	+0.2
Labour hold		Swing	+2.5	

Wombwell North (5477)
Party	Candidate	Votes	%	±%
Labour	Storey A.*	Unopposed	N/A	N/A
Labour hold		Swing	N/A	

Wombwell South (8007)
Party	Candidate	Votes	%	±%
Independent	Mahatme S.	2,020	50.3	+7.1
Labour	Turp G.	1,996	49.7	−0.6
Majority		24	0.6	−6.5
Turnout		4,016	50.2	+4.9
Independent gain from Labour		Swing	+3.8	

Worsbrough (8314)
Party	Candidate	Votes	%	±%
Labour	Hadfield G.*	2,775	83.3	+11.1
Conservative	Pappworth R.	555	16.7	+4.4
Majority		2,220	66.7	+9.9
Turnout		3,330	40.1	−4.5
Labour hold		Swing	+3.3	

== By-elections between 1984 and 1986 ==
Penistone East (6836) 14 June 1984 By-election
Party	Candidate	Votes	%	±%
Labour	Hunter, D. J.	1,333	42.6	+2.8
Conservative	Wardle, M.	1,289	41.2	+0.1
Alliance	Hanstock, O. A.	506	16.2	−2.9
Majority		44	1.4	+0.1
Turnout		3,128	45.8	−1.8
Labour gain from Alliance		Swing	+1.3	

Park (5966) 3 May 1985 By-election
Party	Candidate	Votes	%	±%
Labour	Murphy, G.	1,529	69.7	−9.8
Alliance	Appleyard, J. R.	502	22.9	+11.6
Conservative	Dobbin, J. N.	162	7.4	−1.9
Majority		1,027	46.8	−21.4
Turnout		2,193	36.8	+0.1
Labour hold		Swing	-10.7	
