= 1979 Barnsley Metropolitan Borough Council election =

1979 local election in England

← 1978	3 May 1979	1980 →

All 66 seats to Barnsley Metropolitan Borough Council 34 seats needed for a majority
	First party	Second party	Third party
Party	Labour	Residents	Conservative
Seats won	41	18	3
Seat change	Steady	Steady	Steady
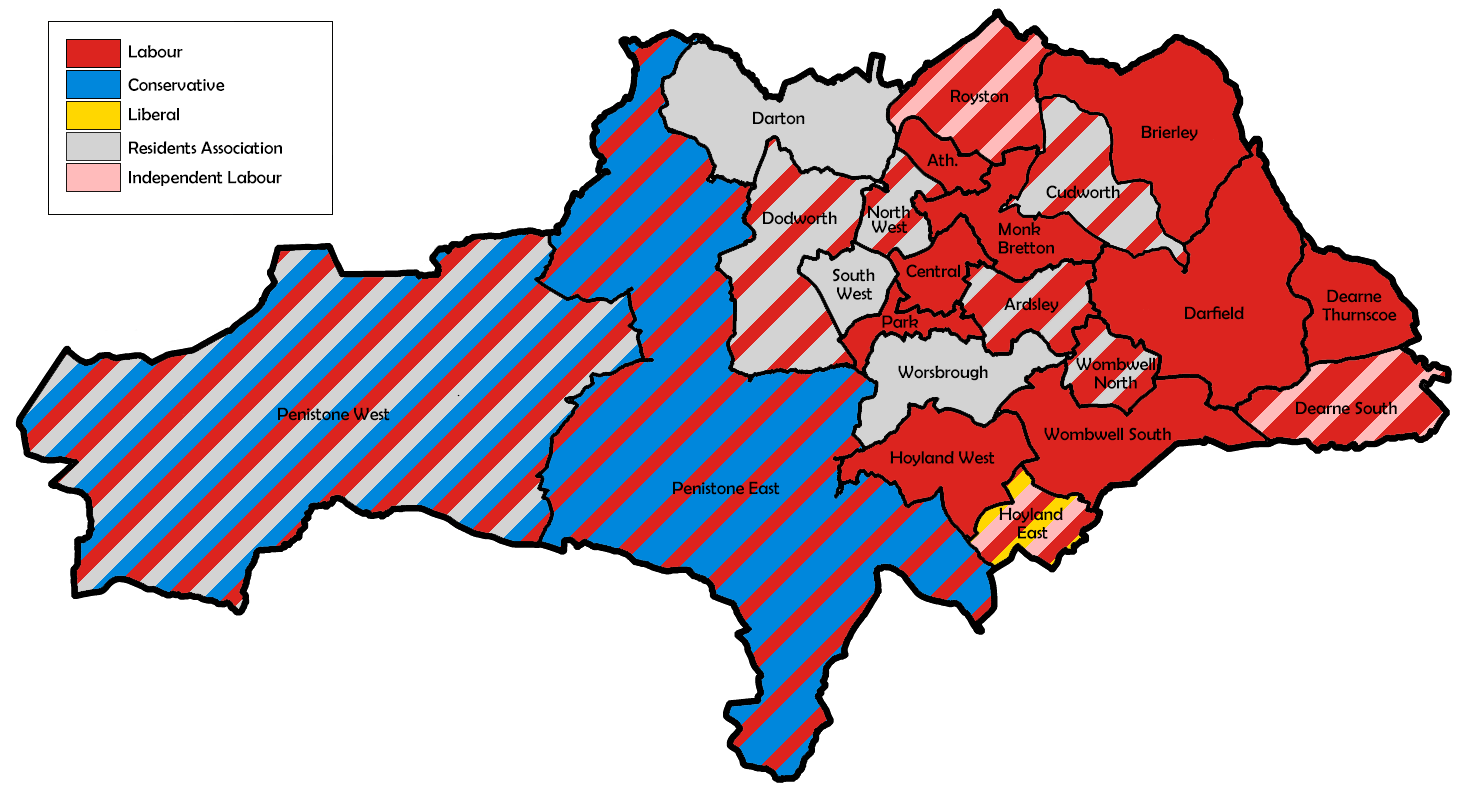
- Map showing the results of the 1979 Barnsley council elections.
Majority party before election
Labour
Majority party after election
Labour

Elections to Barnsley Metropolitan Borough Council were held simultaneously with the general election on 3 May 1979. Following boundary changes that increased the number of wards by two to 22, with an additional 6 seats to 66 respectively), the entirety of the council was up for election. Labour retained control of the council.

== Election result ==
Barnsley Metropolitan Borough Council Election Result 1979
Party	Seats	Gains	Losses	Net gain/loss	Seats %	Votes %	Votes	+/−
Labour	41	0	0	0	62.1	44.3	61,328	-7.4
Residents	18	0	0	0	27.3	30.8	43,321	-0.2
Conservative	3	0	0	0	4.5	9.2	12,890	+0.1
Independent Labour	3	0	0	0	4.5	7.3	10,234	+7.3
Liberal	1	0	0	0	1.5	6.5	9,160	+2.2
Independent	0	0	0	0	0.0	1.5	2,121	-3.1
Tenants and Owner Occupiers' Association	0	0	0	0	0.0	0.9	1,225	+0.9
Fight Big Brother	0	0	0	0	0.0	0.2	209	+0.2
Communist	0	0	0	0	0.0	0.1	166	+0.1

This resulted in the following composition of the council:

Party	Previous council	New council
Labour	37	41
Residents	14	18
Conservatives	1	3
Independent Labour	2	3
Liberals	5	1
Independent	1	0
Total	60	66
Working majority	14	16

== Ward results ==
Ardsley (7592)
Party	Candidate	Votes	%	±%
Labour	Galvin E.	3,018	46.6	N/A
Labour	Burns J.*	2,690		
Residents	Parkin A. Ms.	2,239	34.6	N/A
Labour	Wilkie A.	2,038		
Conservative	Kitching A.	1,218	18.8	N/A
Majority		779	12.0	N/A
Turnout				N/A
Labour win (new seat)				
Labour win (new seat)				
Residents win (new seat)				

Athersley (7223)
Party	Candidate	Votes	%	±%
Labour	Bright G. Ms.	3,084	71.5	N/A
Labour	Langford L.	2,854		
Labour	Dancer H.	2,655		
Residents	Sykes F. Ms.	1,231	28.5	N/A
Majority		1,853	42.9	N/A
Turnout				N/A
Labour win (new seat)				
Labour win (new seat)				
Labour win (new seat)				

Brierley (7142)
Party	Candidate	Votes	%	±%
Labour	Baines D.	2,957	54.1	N/A
Labour	Stacey N.	2,835		
Labour	Woolley E.	2,686		
Residents	Anderson P. Ms.	1,310	24.0	N/A
Conservative	Schofield D. Ms.	1,202	22.0	N/A
Residents	Whitaker K.	1,158		
Majority		1,647	30.1	N/A
Turnout				N/A
Labour win (new seat)				
Labour win (new seat)				
Labour win (new seat)				

Central (8170)
Party	Candidate	Votes	%	±%
Labour	Fisher R.	2,586	44.6	N/A
Labour	Kaye F.	2,522		
Labour	Watts J. Ms.	2,203		
Residents	Jackson M.	2,117	36.6	N/A
Residents	French W.	2,088		
Residents	Sykes E.	2,025		
Liberal	Fox S. Ms.	1,089	18.8	N/A
Liberal	Major C.	932		
Majority		469	8.1	N/A
Turnout				N/A
Labour win (new seat)				
Labour win (new seat)				
Labour win (new seat)				

Cudworth (7481)
Party	Candidate	Votes	%	±%
Labour	Salt H.	2,659	51.5	N/A
Residents	Wraith C.	2,502	48.5	N/A
Residents	Green K.	2,477		
Labour	Rigby R.	2,325		
Labour	Bellis E.	2,197		
Residents	McDonald T.	2,027		
Majority		157	3.0	N/A
Turnout				N/A
Labour win (new seat)				
Residents win (new seat)				
Residents win (new seat)				

Darfield (7803)
Party	Candidate	Votes	%	±%
Labour	Goddard B.	2,999	42.4	N/A
Labour	Dixon T.	2,972		
Labour	Ellis A. Ms.	2,463		
Residents	Murdock R.	2,013	28.4	N/A
Residents	Moore J.	1,970		
Conservative	Batty C. Ms.	1,377	19.5	N/A
Independent Labour	Butterworth H.	687	9.7	N/A
Independent Labour	Sutton F.	366		
Majority		986	13.9	N/A
Turnout				N/A
Labour win (new seat)				
Labour win (new seat)				
Labour win (new seat)				

Darton (8728)
Party	Candidate	Votes	%	±%
Residents	Hutchinson M.	3,186	41.7	N/A
Residents	Evans J.	2,979		
Residents	Lappage A.	2,560		
Labour	Booth D.	2,235	29.2	N/A
Labour	Bretton W.	2,161		
Labour	Eastwood G.	2,007		
Tenants and Owner Occupiers' Association	Hesford K.	1,225	16.0	N/A
Liberal	Linstead M. Ms.	793	10.4	N/A
Fight Big Brother	Wilson A.	209	2.7	N/A
Fight Big Brother	Ives G.	155		
Fight Big Brother	Wilson M.	83		
Majority		951	12.4	N/A
Turnout				N/A
Residents win (new seat)				
Residents win (new seat)				
Residents win (new seat)				

Dearne South (8776)
Party	Candidate	Votes	%	±%
Labour	Stanley J.	4,622	58.6	N/A
Independent Labour	Gregory J.	3,269	41.4	N/A
Labour	Whitehouse S.	3,158		
Labour	Bedford J.	3,014		
Majority		1,353	17.1	N/A
Turnout				N/A
Labour win (new seat)				
Independent Labour win (new seat)				
Labour win (new seat)				

Dearne Thurnscoe (8489)
Party	Candidate	Votes	%	±%
Labour	Oldham J.	3,919	67.9	N/A
Labour	Lloyd D.	3,747		
Labour	Young K.	3,671		
Residents	Law M.	1,850	32.1	N/A
Majority		2,069	35.9	N/A
Turnout				N/A
Labour win (new seat)				
Labour win (new seat)				
Labour win (new seat)				

Dodworth (7935)
Party	Candidate	Votes	%	±%
Residents	Crosby J.	2,822	51.2	N/A
Residents	Whitmey C.	2,777		
Labour	Mason G.	2,690	48.8	N/A
Labour	Hepworth S.	2,618		
Labour	Brown D.	2,455		
Majority		132	2.4	N/A
Turnout				N/A
Residents win (new seat)				
Residents win (new seat)				
Labour win (new seat)				

Hoyland East (7770)
Party	Candidate	Votes	%	±%
Independent Labour	Eaden D.	3,218	32.4	N/A
Liberal	Steer G.	2,933	29.5	N/A
Labour	Beardshall P.	2,306	23.2	N/A
Labour	Levitt L.	2,113		
Labour	Scott P.	1,862		
Independent	Chantrey O. Ms.	1,478	14.9	N/A
Majority		285	2.9	N/A
Turnout				N/A
Independent Labour win (new seat)				
Liberal win (new seat)				
Labour win (new seat)				

Hoyland West (6890)
Party	Candidate	Votes	%	±%
Labour	Schofield A.	2,657	55.0	N/A
Labour	Hague D.	2,583		
Labour	Wroe C.	2,570		
Residents	Dickinson R.	2,173	45.0	N/A
Residents	Hancock S.	1,812		
Residents	Thickett J.	1,764		
Majority		484	10.0	N/A
Turnout				N/A
Labour win (new seat)				
Labour win (new seat)				
Labour win (new seat)				

Monk Bretton (8762)
Party	Candidate	Votes	%	±%
Labour	Barron R.	3,229	59.1	N/A
Labour	Robinson R.	3,085		
Labour	Sheard T.	2,949		
Residents	Evans B.	2,233	40.9	N/A
Residents	Beevers A.	2,217		
Residents	Frost N. Ms.	1,969		
Majority		996	18.2	N/A
Turnout				N/A
Labour win (new seat)				
Labour win (new seat)				
Labour win (new seat)				

North West (7335)
Party	Candidate	Votes	%	±%
Residents	Harris J.	2,554	38.0	N/A
Labour	Williams A.	2,333	34.7	N/A
Residents	Beecroft E. Ms.	2,213		
Labour	Cooper G.	2,187		
Labour	Wilde J.	2,147		
Conservative	Guest M.	1,665	24.8	N/A
Communist	Sykes S.	166	2.5	N/A
Communist	Hydes M.	140		
Majority		221	3.3	N/A
Turnout				N/A
Residents win (new seat)				
Labour win (new seat)				
Residents win (new seat)				

Park (5948)
Party	Candidate	Votes	%	±%
Labour	Lunn F.	2,818	49.2	N/A
Labour	Warden R.	2,246		
Labour	Borrett K.	2,211		
Liberal	Wilby M. Ms.	1,076	18.8	N/A
Residents	Milthorpe O. Ms.	927	16.2	N/A
Conservative	Oldfield H.	912	15.9	N/A
Majority		1,742	30.4	N/A
Turnout				N/A
Labour win (new seat)				
Labour win (new seat)				
Labour win (new seat)				

Penistone East (6685)
Party	Candidate	Votes	%	±%
Labour	Fish H.	2,667	46.1	N/A
Conservative	Wade J.	2,144	37.1	N/A
Conservative	Tue G. Ms.	1,911		
Labour	Hirst E.	1,754		
Conservative	Evans J.	1,738		
Labour	Council R.	1,529		
Liberal	Nicholson M.	971	16.8	N/A
Liberal	Smith S.	871		
Majority		523	9.0	N/A
Turnout				N/A
Labour win (new seat)				
Conservative win (new seat)				
Conservative win (new seat)				

Penistone West (7515)
Party	Candidate	Votes	%	±%
Residents	Harrison M. Ms.	4,155	41.9	N/A
Conservative	Neville F. Ms.	2,908	29.3	N/A
Labour	Ashton F.	2,214	22.3	
Conservative	Hague F.	1,857		
Labour	Mountain G.	882		
Labour	Whewell G.	861		
Independent	Ryalls D.	643	6.5	N/A
Majority		1,247	12.6	N/A
Turnout				N/A
Residents win (new seat)				
Conservative win (new seat)				
Labour win (new seat)				

Royston (7733)
Party	Candidate	Votes	%	±%
Independent Labour	Parkes E. Ms.	3,060	42.1	N/A
Labour	Rispin C.	2,949	40.5	N/A
Labour	Ball J.	2,673		
Labour	Pickles M. Ms.	2,370		
Residents	Goodliffe P.	1,265	17.4	N/A
Residents	Greasley J.	1,187		
Majority		111	1.5	N/A
Turnout				N/A
Independent Labour win (new seat)				
Labour win (new seat)				
Labour win (new seat)				

South West (7333)
Party	Candidate	Votes	%	±%
Residents	Addison M. Ms.	2,997	52.5	N/A
Residents	Pemberton K.	2,618		
Residents	Kershaw J. Ms.	2,502		
Labour	Sinfield W.	1,840	32.2	N/A
Labour	Almond B.	1,660		
Labour	Stokes M.	1,639		
Conservative	Moorhouse J.	869	15.2	N/A
Majority		1,157	20.3	N/A
Turnout				N/A
Residents win (new seat)				
Residents win (new seat)				
Residents win (new seat)				

Wombwell North (5461)
Party	Candidate	Votes	%	±%
Residents	Wraith R.	2,129	53.9	N/A
Labour	Fellows B.	1,822	46.1	N/A
Labour	Storey A.	1,775		
Labour	Remington J.	1,663		
Majority		307	7.8	N/A
Turnout				N/A
Residents win (new seat)				
Labour win (new seat)				
Labour win (new seat)				

Wombwell South (7895)
Party	Candidate	Votes	%	±%
Labour	Wake J.	3,246	42.2	N/A
Labour	Naylor T.	2,842		
Labour	Goddard J.	2,831		
Liberal	Hargreaves P.	2,298	29.8	N/A
Residents	Nield M. Ms.	2,157	28.0	N/A
Majority		948	12.3	N/A
Turnout				N/A
Labour win (new seat)				
Labour win (new seat)				
Labour win (new seat)				

Worsbrough (8249)
Party	Candidate	Votes	%	±%
Residents	Batty S. Ms.	3,461	53.0	N/A
Residents	Dickinson F.	3,171		
Residents	Ashton A.	2,696		
Labour	Bland J.	2,478	37.9	N/A
Labour	Smith W.	2,267		
Labour	Holdroyd F.	2,035		
Conservative	England G.	595	9.1	N/A
Majority		983	15.0	N/A
Turnout				N/A
Residents win (new seat)				
Residents win (new seat)				
Residents win (new seat)				

== By-elections between 1979 and 1980 ==
South West (7333) By-Election 29 November 1979
Party	Candidate	Votes	%	±%
Residents	Froggat, B	976	54.3	+11.0
Labour	Almond, B. J	820	45.7	−1.3
Majority		156	8.7	+5.0
Turnout		1,796	24.5	−18.7
Residents hold		Swing	+6.1	
