= 1980 Barnsley Metropolitan Borough Council election =

1980 local election in England

← 1979	1 May 1980	1982 →

One third of seats (22 of 66) to Barnsley Metropolitan Borough Council 34 seats needed for a majority
	First party	Second party	Third party
Party	Labour	Residents	Conservative
Seats won	20	1	1
Seat change	▲5	▼5	Steady
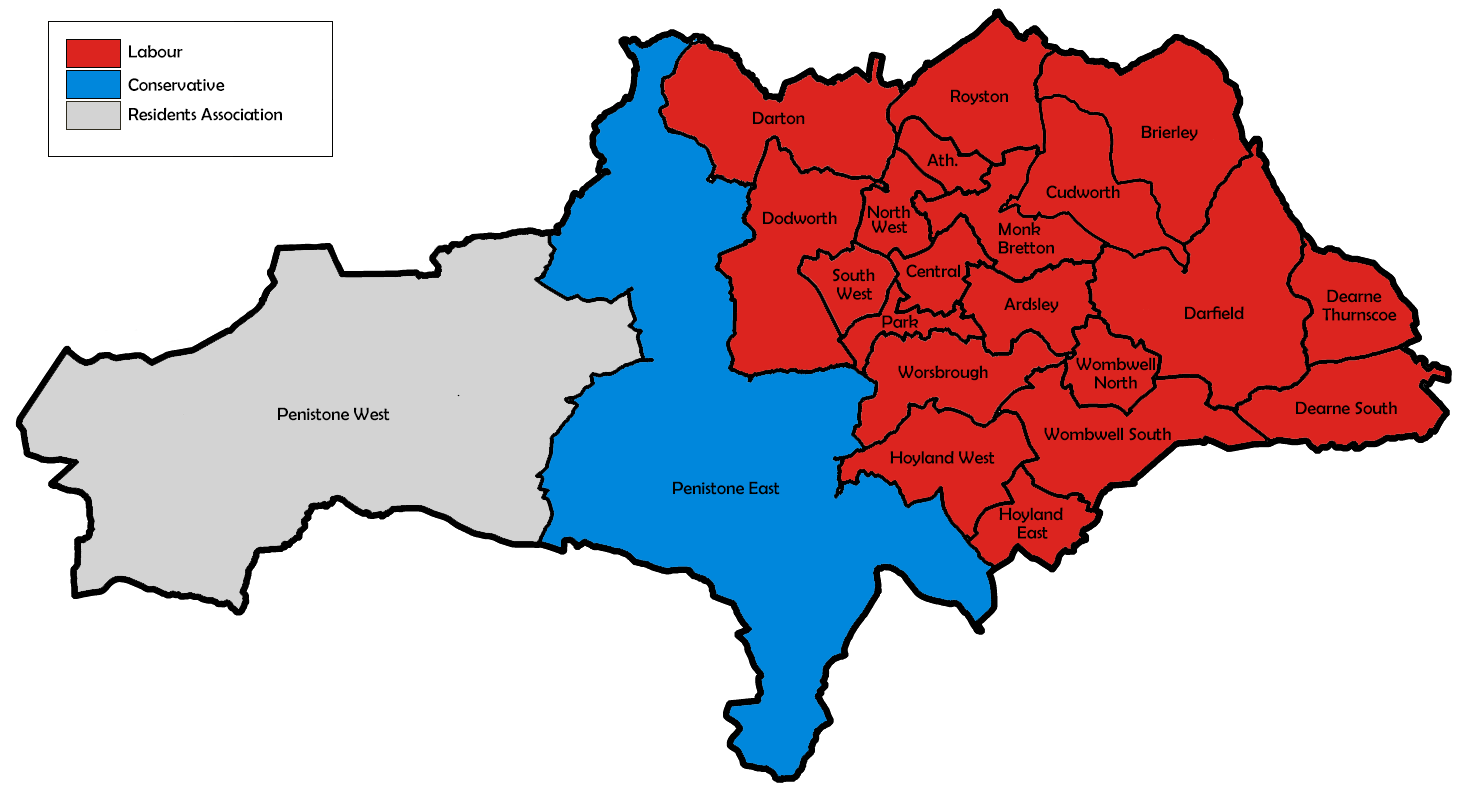
- Map showing the results of the 1980 Barnsley council elections.
Majority party before election
Labour
Majority party after election
Labour

Elections to Barnsley Metropolitan Borough Council were held on 1 May 1980, with one third of the council up for election. Labour retained control of the council.

== Election result ==
Barnsley Metropolitan Borough Council Election Result 1980
Party	Seats	Gains	Losses	Net gain/loss	Seats %	Votes %	Votes	+/−
Labour	20	6	1	+5	90.9	59.0	35,123	+14.7
Residents	1	1	6	-5	4.5	31.6	18,769	+0.8
Conservative	1	0	0	0	4.5	6.1	3,652	-3.1
Liberal	0	0	0	0	0.0	2.6	1,545	-3.9
Tenants and Owner Occupiers' Association	0	0	0	0	0.0	0.5	284	-0.4
Communist	0	0	0	0	0.0	0.2	123	+0.1

This resulted in the following composition of the council:

Party	Previous council	New council
Labour	41	46
Residents	18	13
Conservatives	3	3
Independent Labour	3	3
Liberals	1	1
Total	66	66
Working majority	16	26

== Ward results ==
+/- figures represent changes from the last time these wards were contested.

Ardsley (7570)
Party	Candidate	Votes	%	±%
Labour	Wilson H.	1,286	55.4	+8.8
Residents	Parkin A. Ms.	820	35.3	+0.8
Conservative	Kitching A.	214	9.2	−9.6
Majority		466	20.1	+8.1
Turnout		2,320	30.6	
Labour gain from Residents		Swing	+4.0	

Athersley (7198)
Party	Candidate	Votes	%	±%
Labour	Dancer H.	1,488	84.4	+13.0
Residents	Sykes E.	274	15.6	−13.0
Majority		1,214	68.8	+26.0
Turnout		1,762	24.5	
Labour hold		Swing	+13.0	

Brierley (7234)
Party	Candidate	Votes	%	±%
Labour	Whittaker N.	1,748	83.6	+29.6
Conservative	Schofield D. Ms.	342	16.4	−5.6
Majority		1,406	67.3	+37.2
Turnout		2,090	28.9	
Labour hold		Swing	+17.6	

Central (8206)
Party	Candidate	Votes	%	±%
Labour	Watts J. Ms.	1,603	56.2	+11.6
Residents	Jackson M.	1,044	36.6	+0.1
Conservative	Oldfield H.	204	7.2	+7.2
Majority		559	19.6	+11.5
Turnout		2,851	34.7	
Labour hold		Swing	+5.7	

Cudworth (7496)
Party	Candidate	Votes	%	±%
Labour	Rigby R.	1,705	58.9	+7.4
Residents	Harriman E.	1,020	35.2	−13.2
Conservative	Hudson C.	169	5.8	+5.8
Majority		685	23.7	+20.7
Turnout		2,894	38.6	
Labour gain from Residents		Swing	+10.3	

Darfield (7840)
Party	Candidate	Votes	%	±%
Labour	Barlow E.	1,742	64.6	+22.2
Residents	Bannister J.	956	35.4	+7.0
Majority		786	29.1	+15.2
Turnout		2,698	34.4	
Labour hold		Swing	+7.6	

Darton (8764)
Party	Candidate	Votes	%	±%
Labour	Stocks R.	1,706	45.6	+16.4
Residents	Butterfield N.	1,392	37.2	−4.5
Tenants and Owner Occupiers' Association	Hesford K.	284	7.6	−8.4
Conservative	England G.	275	7.3	+7.3
Liberal	Linstead M. Ms.	86	2.3	−8.1
Majority		314	8.4	−4.0
Turnout		3,743	42.7	
Labour gain from Residents		Swing	+10.4	

Dearne South (8835)
Party	Candidate	Votes	%	±%
Labour	Whitehouse S.	2,379	90.3	+31.7
Residents	Moore J.	256	9.7	+9.7
Majority		2,123	80.6	+63.5
Turnout		2,635	29.8	
Labour hold		Swing	+11.0	

Dearne Thurnscoe (8423)
Party	Candidate	Votes	%	±%
Labour	Young K.	Unopposed	N/A	N/A
Labour hold		Swing	N/A	

Dodworth (7944)
Party	Candidate	Votes	%	±%
Labour	Mason G.	1,907	53.7	+4.9
Residents	Wray D.	1,191	33.5	−17.7
Liberal	Butcher D.	332	9.3	+9.3
Communist	Sykes S.	123	3.5	+3.5
Majority		716	20.2	+17.8
Turnout		3,553	44.7	
Labour hold		Swing	+11.3	

Hoyland East (7827)
Party	Candidate	Votes	%	±%
Labour	Beardshall P.	1,618	60.2	+37.0
Liberal	Dyson M. Ms.	643	23.9	−5.6
Residents	Thickett J.	427	15.9	+15.9
Majority		975	36.3	+33.4
Turnout		2,688	34.3	
Labour hold		Swing	+21.3	

Hoyland West (6891)
Party	Candidate	Votes	%	±%
Labour	Wroe C.	1,959	67.3	+12.3
Residents	Dickinson R.	950	32.7	−12.3
Majority		1,009	34.6	+24.6
Turnout		2,909	42.2	
Labour hold		Swing	+12.3	

Monk Bretton (8726)
Party	Candidate	Votes	%	±%
Labour	Sheard T.	2,058	70.6	+11.5
Residents	Smith J.	675	23.2	−17.7
Conservative	Bodoano G.	181	6.2	+6.2
Majority		1,383	47.5	+29.3
Turnout		2,914	33.4	
Labour hold		Swing	+14.6	

North West (7450)
Party	Candidate	Votes	%	±%
Labour	Wilde J.	1,814	57.3	+22.6
Residents	Beecroft E. Ms.	1,352	42.7	+4.7
Majority		462	14.6	+11.3
Turnout		7,450	42.5	
Labour gain from Residents		Swing	+8.9	

Park (5943)
Party	Candidate	Votes	%	±%
Labour	Borrett K.	1,302	73.8	+24.7
Residents	Kent J.	218	12.4	−3.8
Liberal	Wilby M. Ms.	133	7.5	−11.2
Conservative	Kitching P. Ms.	111	6.3	−9.6
Majority		1,084	61.5	+31.1
Turnout		1,764	29.7	
Labour hold		Swing	+14.2	

Penistone East (6708)
Party	Candidate	Votes	%	±%
Conservative	Tue G. Ms.	1,677	54.7	+17.7
Labour	Barker T.	1,387	45.3	−0.9
Majority		290	9.5	+0.5
Turnout		3,064	45.7	
Conservative hold		Swing	+9.3	

Penistone West (7718)
Party	Candidate	Votes	%	±%
Residents	Clegg B.	2,818	68.2	+26.3
Labour	Ashton F.	961	23.3	+1.0
Liberal	Bailey A.	351	8.5	+8.5
Majority		1,857	45.0	+32.4
Turnout		4,130	53.5	
Residents gain from Labour		Swing	+12.6	

Royston (7813)
Party	Candidate	Votes	%	±%
Labour	Ball J.	1,718	57.6	+17.1
Residents	Whitehead E. Ms.	1,265	42.4	+25.0
Majority		453	15.2	+13.7
Turnout		2,983	38.2	
Labour hold		Swing	-3.9	

South West (7323)
Party	Candidate	Votes	%	±%
Labour	Hyman D.	1,486	47.0	+14.8
Residents	Kershaw J. Ms.	1,369	43.3	−9.2
Conservative	Cousins B.	305	9.7	−5.6
Majority		117	3.7	−16.6
Turnout		3,160	43.2	
Labour gain from Residents		Swing	+12.0	

Wombwell North (5404)
Party	Candidate	Votes	%	±%
Labour	Storey A.	1,038	61.8	+15.7
Residents	Nield M. Ms.	642	38.2	−15.7
Majority		396	23.6	+15.8
Turnout		1,680	31.1	
Labour hold		Swing	+15.7	

Wombwell South (7835)
Party	Candidate	Votes	%	±%
Labour	Goddard J.	1,768	76.3	+34.2
Residents	Rushforth J. Ms.	549	23.7	−4.3
Majority		1,219	52.6	+32.4
Turnout		2,317	29.6	
Labour hold		Swing	+19.2	

Worsbrough (8201)
Party	Candidate	Votes	%	±%
Labour	Hadfield G.	2,450	58.7	+20.8
Residents	Ashton A.	1,551	37.1	−15.8
Conservative	Jones R.	174	4.2	−4.9
Majority		899	21.5	+6.5
Turnout		4,175	50.9	
Labour gain from Residents		Swing	+18.3	

== By-elections between 1980 and 1982 ==
Brierley (7234) 25 September 1980 By-election
Party	Candidate	Votes	%	±%
Labour	Ennis J.	1,265	85.4	+1.8
Conservative	Schofield D. Ms.	217	14.6	−1.8
Majority		1,048	70.8	+3.5
Turnout		1,482	20.5	−8.4
Labour hold		Swing	+1.8	

Ardsley (7588) 7 May 1981 By-election
Party	Candidate	Votes	%	±%
Labour	Shirt R.	1,291	48.7	−6.7
Residents	Parkin A. Ms.	1,088	41.0	+5.7
Conservative	England G.	273	10.3	+1.1
Majority		203	7.7	−12.4
Turnout		2,652	35.0	+4.4
Labour hold		Swing	-6.2	

Dodworth (7981) 10 December 1981 By-election
Party	Candidate	Votes	%	±%
Labour	Brown D.	1,335	44.6	−9.1
Alliance (SDP)	Williamson, J. D.	1,304	43.6	+34.3
Residents	Wray D.	269	9.0	−24.5
Conservative	Nicholls, C. J.	85	2.8	−0.7
Majority		31	1.0	−19.2
Turnout		2,993	37.5	−7.2
Labour gain from Residents		Swing	-21.7	

Penistone East (6681) 18 February 1982 By-election
Party	Candidate	Votes	%	±%
Alliance	Hanstock, O. A.	1,078	42.0	+42.0
Conservative	Dews, R.	607	23.7	−31.0
Labour	Barker T.	879	34.3	−11.0
Majority		471	18.3	+8.8
Turnout		2,564	38.4	−7.3
Alliance gain from Labour		Swing	+36.5	
