= 1975 Barnsley Metropolitan Borough Council election =

1975 local election in England

← 1973	1 May 1975	1976 →

20 of 60 seats to Barnsley Metropolitan Borough Council 31 seats needed for a majority
	First party	Second party	Third party
Party	Labour	Ratepayers	Liberal
Seats won	10	6	2
Seat change	▼9	▲6	▲2
Majority party before election
Labour
Majority party after election
Labour

Elections to Barnsley Metropolitan Borough Council were held on 1 May 1975 with one third of the seats up for election. Labour retained control of the council.

== Election result ==
Barnsley Metropolitan Borough Council Election Result 1975
Party	Seats	Gains	Losses	Net gain/loss	Seats %	Votes %	Votes	+/−
Labour	10	0	9	-9	50.0	52.5	20,997	-10.2
Ratepayers	6	6	0	+6	30.0	26.8	13,309	+24.6
Liberal	2	2	0	+2	10.0	17.1	8,473	+7.9
Conservative	1	1	0	+1	5.0	8.6	4,244	-1.1
Independent Labour	1	0	0	0	5.0	3.5	1,715	-1.5
Independent	0	0	0	0	0.0	1.3	641	-6.4
Communist	0	0	0	0	0.0	0.5	266	-0.9

This resulted in the following composition of the council:

Party	Previous council	New council
Labour	57	48
Ratepayers	0	6
Liberals	0	2
Conservatives	0	1
Democratic Labour	1	1
Independent	1	1
Independent Labour	1	1
Total	60	60
Working majority	54	36

== Ward results ==
+/- figures represent changes from the last time these wards were contested.

Ardsley (7325)
Party	Candidate	Votes	%	±%
Labour	Burns J.*	929	50.9	−27.5
Ratepayers	Wilkinson G.	611	33.5	+33.5
Conservative	Walker	284	15.6	+15.6
Majority		318	17.4	−39.5
Turnout		1,824	24.9	+1.8
Labour hold		Swing	-30.5	

No. 1 (Barnsley: Carlton) (10375)
Party	Candidate	Votes	%	±%
Labour	Dancer H.*	1,055	56.4	−19.4
Ratepayers	Sykes	621	33.2	+33.2
Conservative	Carrington J.	130	7.0	−5.0
Communist	Greenfield N.	63	3.4	−8.8
Majority		434	23.2	−40.4
Turnout		1,869	18.0	−3.7
Labour hold		Swing	-26.3	

No. 2 (Barnsley: East & North) (8573)
Party	Candidate	Votes	%	±%
Ratepayers	Harris M.	1,400	42.5	+42.5
Labour	Fisher R.*	1,224	37.1	−21.9
Conservative	Guest M.	312	9.5	−3.2
Independent	Reynolds	184	5.6	+5.6
Liberal	Hallsworth	177	5.4	+5.4
Majority		176	5.3	−25.4
Turnout		3,297	38.5	+3.1
Ratepayers gain from Labour		Swing	+32.2	

No. 3 (Barnsley: Central-South-South East)(9660)
Party	Candidate	Votes	%	±%
Labour	Borrett K.*	1,139	52.5	−7.7
Ratepayers	Crawshaw	737	33.9	+33.9
Conservative	England	295	13.6	+6.1
Majority		402	18.5	−9.2
Turnout		2,171	22.5	−17.2
Labour hold		Swing	-20.8	

No. 4 (Barnsley: South West and West) (7765)
Party	Candidate	Votes	%	±%
Ratepayers	Birkenshaw	1,619	51.4	+51.4
Labour	Hardy	1,022	32.4	−19.3
Independent	Blackburne E.	378	12.0	+12.0
Conservative	Oldfield H.	133	4.2	−5.5
Majority		597	18.9	+5.8
Turnout		3,152	40.6	+1.3
Ratepayers gain from Labour		Swing	+35.3	

No. 5 (Barnsley: Monk Bretton) (9984)
Party	Candidate	Votes	%	±%
Ratepayers	Jackson	1,341	52.6	+52.6
Labour	Wilkie B.*	906	35.5	−36.6
Conservative	Glover	223	8.7	−7.6
Independent	Cooke L.	79	3.1	+3.1
Majority		435	17.1	−38.8
Turnout		2,549	25.5	+3.4
Ratepayers gain from Labour		Swing	+44.6	

No. 7 (Cudworth) (6278)
Party	Candidate	Votes	%	±%
Ratepayers	Wraith	1,159	57.0	N/A
Labour	Bailey	873	43.0	N/A
Majority		286	14.0	N/A
Turnout		2,032	32.4	N/A
Ratepayers gain from Labour		Swing	N/A	

No. 8 (Darfield) (5879)
Party	Candidate	Votes	%	±%
Ratepayers	Moore	938	41.4	N/A
Labour	Goddard B.*	788	34.8	N/A
Liberal	Lynch	537	23.7	N/A
Majority		150	6.6	N/A
Turnout		2,263	38.5	N/A
Ratepayers gain from Labour		Swing	N/A	

No. 9 (Dodworth-Barugh-Higham-Gawber)(6570)
Party	Candidate	Votes	%	±%
Labour	Woffenden J.*	1,533	53.5	−7.6
Liberal	Crosby J.	971	33.9	−5.0
Ratepayers	Barwell	363	12.7	+12.7
Majority		562	19.6	−2.6
Turnout		2,867	43.6	−1.4
Labour hold		Swing	-1.3	

No. 10 (Darton) (8893)
Party	Candidate	Votes	%	±%
Ratepayers	Evans	1,622	56.5	+56.5
Labour	Turner C.*	981	34.1	−4.0
Conservative	Parkes	270	9.4	−6.1
Majority		641	22.3	+3.0
Turnout		2,873	32.3	−12.5
Ratepayers gain from Labour		Swing	+30.2	

No. 11 (Dearne: Central & South) (9844)
Party	Candidate	Votes	%	±%
Labour	Stanley J.	Unopposed	N/A	N/A
Labour hold		Swing	N/A	

No. 12 (Dearne: East & West) (7564)
Party	Candidate	Votes	%	±%
Labour	Young K.*	1,145	72.9	+15.0
Liberal	Jones	223	14.2	+14.2
Communist	Riley P.	203	12.9	−7.3
Majority		922	58.7	+21.0
Turnout		1,571	20.8	−16.5
Labour hold		Swing	+0.4	

No. 13 (Hoyland Nether) (11317)
Party	Candidate	Votes	%	±%
Liberal	Steer	1,932	54.3	+54.3
Labour	Wadsworth A.	1,629	45.7	+10.3
Majority		303	8.5	+2.9
Turnout		3,561	31.5	−30.9
Liberal gain from Labour		Swing	+22.0	

No. 14 (Penistone) (6272)
Party	Candidate	Votes	%	±%
Liberal	Wales	2,211	63.5	+63.5
Labour	Ashton F.*	707	20.3	−13.2
Conservative	Elders	566	16.2	−9.9
Majority		1,504	43.2	+36.3
Turnout		3,484	55.5	−3.5
Liberal gain from Labour		Swing	+38.3	

No. 15 (Royston) (6386)
Party	Candidate	Votes	%	±%
Independent Labour	Parkes E.*	1,715	62.4	+35.5
Labour	Chetter	1,035	37.6	+5.8
Majority		680	24.7	+19.7
Turnout		2,750	43.1	−32.5
Independent Labour hold		Swing	+14.8	

No. 16 (Wombwell: Central-North-South East)(5402)
Party	Candidate	Votes	%	±%
Labour	Storey A.*	562	41.4	−24.6
Ratepayers	Wraith	452	33.3	+33.3
Liberal	Peach	343	25.3	+25.3
Majority		110	8.1	−24.0
Turnout		1,357	25.1	+4.1
Labour hold		Swing	-28.9	

No. 17 (Wombwell: Hemingfield and SouthWest) (7626)
Party	Candidate	Votes	%	±%
Labour	Naylor T.*	1,222	45.0	−24.9
Liberal	Hargreaves	1,028	37.8	+37.8
Ratepayers	Sykes	468	17.2	+17.2
Majority		194	7.1	−32.6
Turnout		2,718	35.6	+4.4
Labour hold		Swing	-31.3	

No. 18 (Worsbrough) (11367)
Party	Candidate	Votes	%	±%
Labour	Smith W.*	1,888	54.1	−9.6
Ratepayers	Batty	1,282	36.7	+36.7
Conservative	Urquhart	322	9.2	−5.4
Majority		606	17.4	−24.7
Turnout		3,492	30.7	−13.8
Labour hold		Swing	-23.1	

No. 19 (Hemsworth Rural) (9058)
Party	Candidate	Votes	%	±%
Labour	Baines D.*	1,362	56.3	+3.7
Ratepayers	Robinson	696	28.8	+28.8
Majority		666	27.5	−5.9
Turnout		2,418	26.7	−22.4
Labour hold		Swing	-12.5	

No. 20 (Penistone Rural & Wortley) (7264)
Party	Candidate	Votes	%	±%
Conservative	Neville	1,349	39.7	+8.3
Liberal	Lees J.	1,051	30.9	+2.7
Labour	Hirst E.*	997	29.3	−11.0
Majority		298	8.8	−0.1
Turnout		3,397	46.8	−8.5
Conservative gain from Labour		Swing	+2.8	
