= 1986 Barnsley Metropolitan Borough Council election =

1986 local election in England

← 1984	8 May 1986	1987 →

One third of seats (24 of 66) to Barnsley Metropolitan Borough Council 34 seats needed for a majority
	First party	Second party	Third party
Party	Labour	Alliance	Conservative
Seats won	24	0	0
Seat change	▲2	▼1	▼1
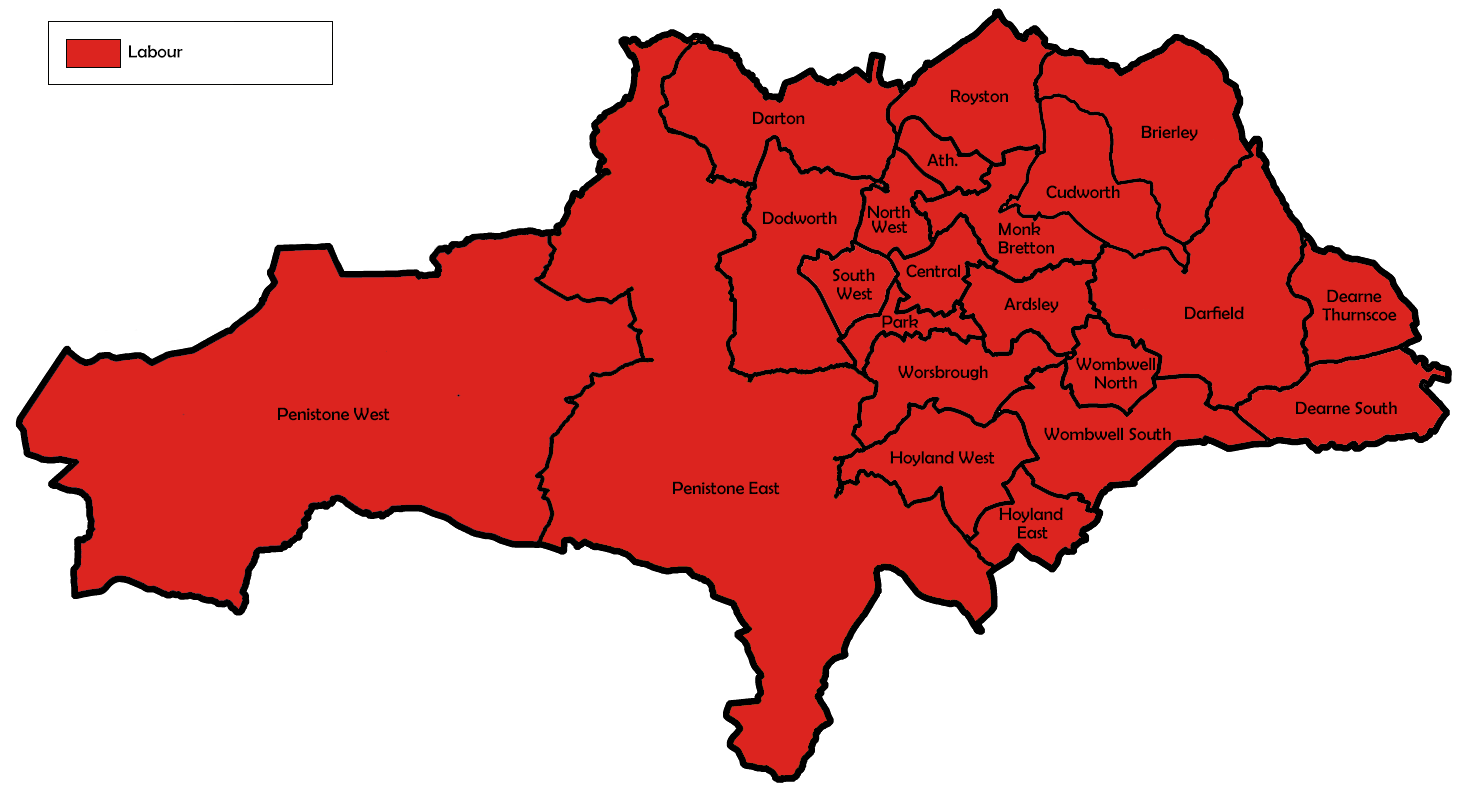
- Map showing the results of the 1986 Barnsley council elections.
Majority party before election
Labour
Majority party after election
Labour

Elections to Barnsley Metropolitan Borough Council were held on 8 May 1986, with one third of the council up for election as well as vacancies in Athersley and South West wards. Prior to the election Labour gained a seat from Alliance in a Penistone East by-election. The election resulted in Labour retaining control of the council.

== Election result ==
Barnsley Metropolitan Borough Council Election Result 1986
Party	Seats	Gains	Losses	Net gain/loss	Seats %	Votes %	Votes	+/−
Labour	24	2	0	+2	100.0	68.5	26,586	-1.8
Alliance	0	0	1	-1	0.0	15.4	5,969	+3.3
Conservative	0	0	1	-1	0.0	7.6	2,952	-2.5
Independent	0	0	0	0	0.0	5.1	1,961	+2.0
Independent Liberal	0	0	0	0	0.0	3.5	1,372	+3.5

This resulted in the following composition of the council:

Party	Previous council	New council
Labour	60	62
Conservatives	3	2
Residents	1	1
Independent	1	1
SDP–Liberal Alliance	1	0
Total	66	66
Working majority	54	58

== Ward results ==
+/- figures represent changes from the last time these wards were contested.

Ardsley (7722)
Party	Candidate	Votes	%	±%
Labour	Shirt R.*	1,504	74.1	−9.9
Alliance	Swift D.	525	25.9	+25.9
Majority		979	48.3	−19.7
Turnout		2,029	26.3	−0.9
Labour hold		Swing	-17.9	

Athersley (7057)2
Party	Candidate	Votes	%	±%
Labour	Moore G.	1,738	86.0	−2.0
Labour	Langford L.*	1,703		
Alliance	Oak A.	282	14.0	+2.0
Majority		1,456	72.1	−4.0
Turnout		2,020	28.6	−2.5
Labour hold		Swing		
Labour hold		Swing	-2.0	

Brierley (7339)
Party	Candidate	Votes	%	±%
Labour	Ennis J.*	2,364	82.6	+4.5
Alliance	Hirst C. Ms.	311	10.9	+1.5
Conservative	Schofield D. Ms.	186	6.5	+0.1
Majority		2,053	71.8	+3.0
Turnout		2,861	39.0	−7.1
Labour hold		Swing	+1.5	

Central (8631)
Party	Candidate	Votes	%	±%
Labour	Wood J.*	2,245	75.7	+4.0
Alliance	Major C.	720	24.3	+3.8
Majority		1,525	51.4	+0.1
Turnout		2,965	34.4	−4.5
Labour hold		Swing	+0.1	

Cudworth (7970)
Party	Candidate	Votes	%	±%
Labour	Wraith C.*	Unopposed	N/A	N/A
Labour hold		Swing	N/A	

Darfield (7993)
Party	Candidate	Votes	%	±%
Labour	Dixon T.*	Unopposed	N/A	N/A
Labour hold		Swing	N/A	

Darton (9280)
Party	Candidate	Votes	%	±%
Labour	McKenna E.	2,463	68.7	+4.3
Alliance	Smith A.	1,120	31.3	+7.9
Majority		1,343	37.5	−3.5
Turnout		3,583	38.6	−3.9
Labour hold		Swing	-1.8	

Dearne South (8814)
Party	Candidate	Votes	%	±%
Labour	Ramsden D.*	Unopposed	N/A	N/A
Labour hold		Swing	N/A	

Dearne Thurnscoe (8553)
Party	Candidate	Votes	%	±%
Labour	Evans C. Ms.	Unopposed	N/A	N/A
Labour hold		Swing	N/A	

Dodworth (8550)
Party	Candidate	Votes	%	±%
Labour	Herring J.*	Unopposed	N/A	N/A
Labour hold		Swing	N/A	

Hoyland East (8047)
Party	Candidate	Votes	%	±%
Labour	Brankin M.	2,202	73.8	−0.4
Independent Liberal	Chantrey J.	780	26.2	+26.2
Majority		1,422	47.7	−0.7
Turnout		2,982	37.1	+3.1
Labour gain from Alliance		Swing	-13.3	

Hoyland West (6755)
Party	Candidate	Votes	%	±%
Labour	Andrews J.	2,073	77.8	+1.8
Independent Liberal	Burd K.	592	22.2	+22.2
Majority		1,481	55.6	+3.7
Turnout		2,665	39.5	−1.7
Labour hold		Swing	-10.2	

Monk Bretton (9184)
Party	Candidate	Votes	%	±%
Labour	Robinson R.*	Unopposed	N/A	N/A
Labour hold		Swing	N/A	

North West (7670)
Party	Candidate	Votes	%	±%
Labour	Williams A.*	1,807	67.2	+6.4
Alliance	Price E.	882	32.8	+32.8
Majority		925	34.4	−1.5
Turnout		2,689	35.1	−1.8
Labour hold		Swing	-13.2	

Park (5988)
Party	Candidate	Votes	%	±%
Labour	Warden R.*	1,746	81.0	+1.5
Alliance	Appleyard J. Ms.	410	19.0	+7.8
Majority		1,336	62.0	−6.2
Turnout		2,156	36.0	−0.7
Labour hold		Swing	-3.1	

Penistone East (6993)
Party	Candidate	Votes	%	±%
Labour	Hunter D.	1,600	47.2	+7.4
Conservative	Wardle M. Ms.	1,178	34.8	−6.4
Alliance	Marshall J. Ms.	610	18.0	−1.1
Majority		422	12.5	+11.2
Turnout		3,388	48.4	+0.9
Labour hold		Swing	+6.9	

Penistone West (8067)
Party	Candidate	Votes	%	±%
Labour	Walker R.	1,612	50.4	+13.0
Conservative	Hinchcliff A. Ms.	1,588	49.6	+21.5
Majority		24	0.8	−2.2
Turnout		3,200	39.7	−1.4
Labour gain from Conservative		Swing	-4.2	

Royston (8667)
Party	Candidate	Votes	%	±%
Labour	Rispin C.*	Unopposed	N/A	N/A
Labour hold		Swing	N/A	

South West (7672)2
Party	Candidate	Votes	%	±%
Labour	Foster D.	1,938	63.6	+13.4
Labour	Parry L.	1,705		
Alliance	Hallam D.	1,109	36.4	−4.8
Majority		829	27.2	+18.2
Turnout		3,047	39.7	−12.6
Labour hold		Swing		
Labour hold		Swing	+9.1	

Wombwell North (5415)
Party	Candidate	Votes	%	±%
Labour	Fellows B.*	1,050	65.3	N/A
Independent	Beck A.	557	34.7	N/A
Majority		493	30.7	N/A
Turnout		1,607	29.7	N/A
Labour hold		Swing	N/A	

Wombwell South (8123)
Party	Candidate	Votes	%	±%
Labour	Naylor T.*	2,244	61.5	+11.8
Independent	Rudkin E.	1,404	38.5	−11.8
Majority		840	23.0	+22.4
Turnout		3,648	44.9	−5.2
Labour hold		Swing	+11.8	

Worsbrough (8108)
Party	Candidate	Votes	%	±%
Labour	Bristowe T.*	Unopposed	N/A	N/A
Labour hold		Swing	N/A	

== By-elections between 1986 and 1987 ==
Brierley (7339) By-election 10 July 1986
Party	Candidate	Votes	%	±%
Labour	Whittaker, A.	1,671	75.4	−7.2
Independent	Vodden, N.	292	13.2	+13.2
Alliance	Hirst C. Ms.	156	7.0	−3.9
Conservative	Schofield D. Ms.	96	4.3	−2.2
Majority		1,379	62.2	−9.6
Turnout		2,215	30.2	−8.8
Labour hold		Swing	-10.2	

Ardsley (7722) By-election 25 September 1986
Party	Candidate	Votes	%	±%
Labour	Parkin, A.	Unopposed	N/A	N/A
Labour hold		Swing	N/A	
