= 1987 Barnsley Metropolitan Borough Council election =

1987 local election in England

← 1986	7 May 1987	1988 →

One third of seats (22 of 66) to Barnsley Metropolitan Borough Council 34 seats needed for a majority
	First party	Second party	Third party
Party	Labour	Conservative	Residents
Seats won	22	1	1
Seat change	▲1	Steady	Steady
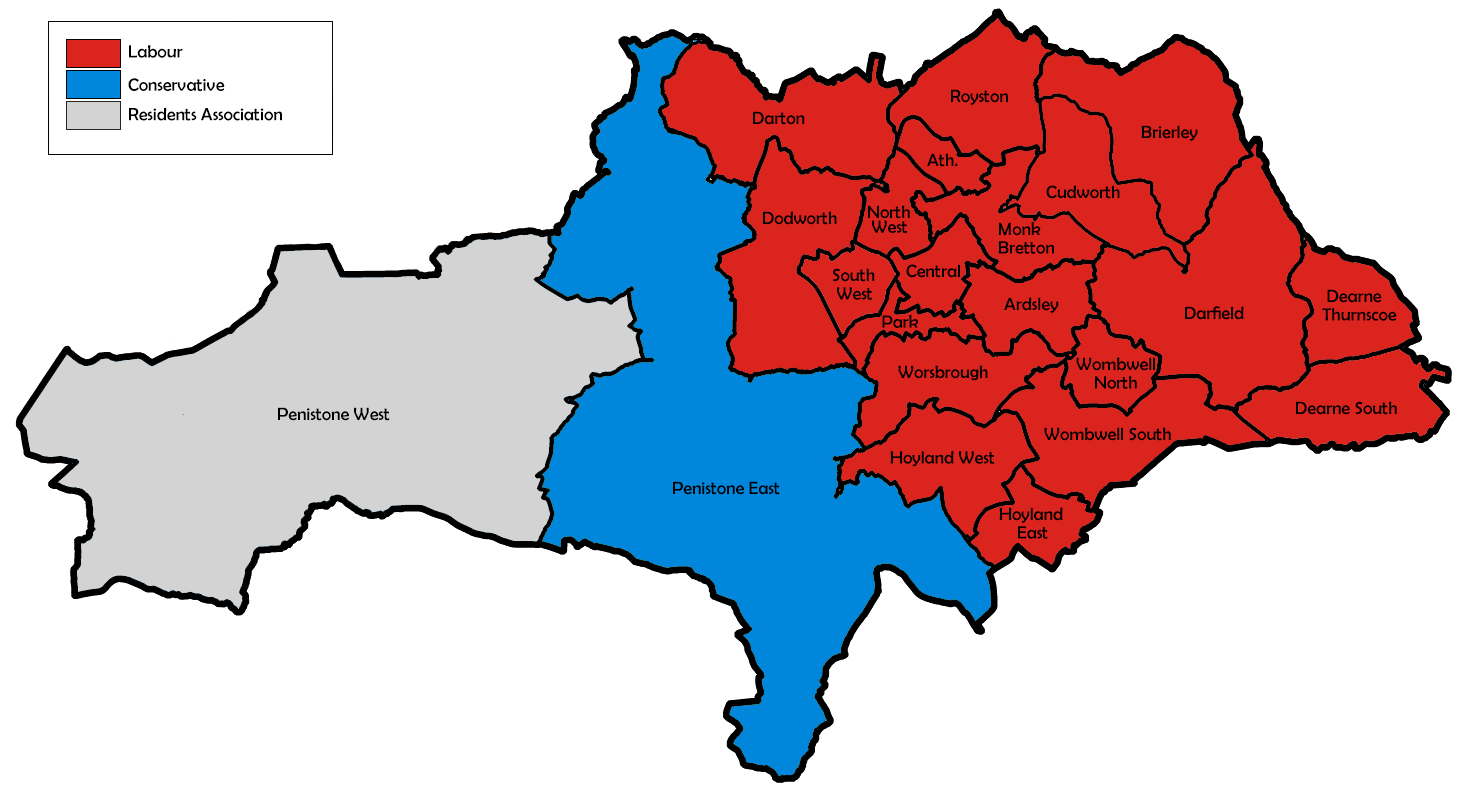
- Map showing the results of the 1987 Barnsley council elections.
Majority party before election
Labour
Majority party after election
Labour

Elections to Barnsley Metropolitan Borough Council were held on 7 May 1987, with one third of the council up for election. Prior to the election, the defending councillor in Ardsley had won the seat for Labour in an uncontested by-election and subsequently defected to Independent Labour. The election resulted in Labour retaining control of the council.

== Election result ==
Barnsley Metropolitan Borough Council Election Result 1987
Party	Seats	Gains	Losses	Net gain/loss	Seats %	Votes %	Votes	+/−
Labour	20	1	0	+1	90.9	63.6	33,462	-4.9
Conservative	1	0	0	0	4.5	12.1	6,373	+4.5
Residents	1	0	0	0	4.5	5.4	2,857	+5.4
Alliance	0	0	0	0	0.0	9.6	5,032	-5.8
Independent	0	0	0	0	0.0	5.9	3,095	+0.8
Independent Labour	0	0	1	-1	0.0	3.4	1,805	+3.4

This resulted in the following composition of the council:

Party	Previous council	New council
Labour	61	62
Conservatives	2	2
Residents	1	1
Independent	1	1
Independent Labour	1	0
Total	66	66
Working majority	56	58

== Ward results ==
+/- figures represent changes from the last time these wards were contested.

Ardsley (7628)
Party	Candidate	Votes	%	±%
Labour	Clowery F.	1,453	60.5	−13.6
Independent Labour	Parkin A. Ms.	948	39.5	+39.5
Majority		505	21.0	−27.3
Turnout		2,401	31.5	+5.2
Labour gain from Independent Labour		Swing	-26.5	

Athersley (7000)
Party	Candidate	Votes	%	±%
Labour	Langford L.*	Unopposed	N/A	N/A
Labour hold		Swing	N/A	

Brierley (7338)
Party	Candidate	Votes	%	±%
Labour	Baines D.*	2,182	73.1	−9.5
Independent Labour	Vodden H.	367	12.3	+12.3
Conservative	Schofield D. Ms.	291	9.8	+3.3
Alliance	Brennan M.	144	4.8	−6.0
Majority		1,815	60.8	−11.0
Turnout		2,984	40.7	+1.7
Labour hold		Swing	-10.9	

Central (8729)
Party	Candidate	Votes	%	±%
Labour	Fisher R.*	2,207	70.2	−5.5
Alliance	Major C.	648	20.6	−3.7
Conservative	Dobbin J.	290	9.2	+9.2
Majority		1,559	49.6	−1.8
Turnout		3,145	36.0	+1.7
Labour hold		Swing	-0.9	

Cudworth (7996)
Party	Candidate	Votes	%	±%
Labour	Salt H.*	2,526	81.5	N/A
Alliance	Hirst C. Ms.	574	18.5	N/A
Majority		1,952	63.0	N/A
Turnout		3,100	38.8	N/A
Labour hold		Swing	N/A	

Darfield (7956)
Party	Candidate	Votes	%	±%
Labour	Goddard B.*	2,275	73.0	N/A
Alliance	Murison J.	471	15.1	N/A
Conservative	Hill G.	370	11.9	N/A
Majority		1,804	57.9	N/A
Turnout		3,116	39.2	N/A
Labour hold		Swing	N/A	

Darton (9265)
Party	Candidate	Votes	%	±%
Labour	Norbury R.*	2,467	66.3	−2.4
Alliance	Smith A.	703	18.9	−12.4
Conservative	Thorpe P.	549	14.8	+14.8
Majority		1,764	47.4	+9.9
Turnout		3,719	40.1	+1.5
Labour hold		Swing	+5.0	

Dearne South (8820)
Party	Candidate	Votes	%	±%
Labour	Greenhalgh P. Ms.*	Unopposed	N/A	N/A
Labour hold		Swing	N/A	

Dearne Thurnscoe (8466)
Party	Candidate	Votes	%	±%
Labour	Lowe J.*	Unopposed	N/A	N/A
Labour hold		Swing	N/A	

Dodworth (8653)
Party	Candidate	Votes	%	±%
Labour	Cawthrow C.*	2,568	65.5	N/A
Alliance	Chamberlain D.	840	21.4	N/A
Conservative	Fielding A.	512	13.1	N/A
Majority		1,728	44.1	N/A
Turnout		3,920	45.3	N/A
Labour hold		Swing	N/A	

Hoyland East (7998)
Party	Candidate	Votes	%	±%
Labour	Lavitt L.*	2,312	83.3	+9.4
Conservative	Hinchliff R.	464	16.7	+16.7
Majority		1,848	66.6	+18.9
Turnout		2,776	34.7	−2.3
Labour hold		Swing	-3.6	

Hoyland West (6787)
Party	Candidate	Votes	%	±%
Labour	Schofield A.*	1,921	68.1	−9.7
Independent	Burd K.	901	31.9	+31.9
Majority		1020	36.1	−19.5
Turnout		2,822	41.6	+2.1
Labour hold		Swing	-20.8	

Monk Bretton (9137)
Party	Candidate	Votes	%	±%
Labour	Barron R.*	Unopposed	N/A	N/A
Labour hold		Swing	N/A	

North West (7659)
Party	Candidate	Votes	%	±%
Labour	Hadfield P.*	1,679	66.1	−1.1
Conservative	Carrington C. Ms.	860	33.9	+33.9
Majority		819	32.3	−2.1
Turnout		2,539	33.2	−1.9
Labour hold		Swing	-17.5	

Park (5863)
Party	Candidate	Votes	%	±%
Labour	Murphy G.*	1,455	58.1	−22.9
Independent Labour	McGrath W.	490	19.6	+19.6
Alliance	Appleyard J. Ms.	350	14.0	−5.0
Conservative	Dews R.	209	8.3	+8.3
Majority		965	38.5	−23.5
Turnout		2,504	42.7	+6.7
Labour hold		Swing	-21.2	

Penistone East (7026)
Party	Candidate	Votes	%	±%
Conservative	Wade J.*	1,743	46.9	+12.1
Labour	O'Connell P.	1,464	39.4	−7.9
Alliance	Marshall J. Ms.	513	13.8	−4.2
Majority		279	7.5	−5.0
Turnout		3,720	52.9	+4.5
Conservative hold		Swing	+10.0	

Penistone West (8151)
Party	Candidate	Votes	%	±%
Residents	Harrison M. Ms.*	2,857	76.2	+76.2
Labour	Bostwick D.	894	23.8	−26.5
Majority		1,963	52.3	+51.5
Turnout		3,751	46.0	+6.4
Residents hold		Swing	+51.3	

Royston (8650)
Party	Candidate	Votes	%	±%
Labour	Lavender H.*	Unopposed	N/A	N/A
Labour hold		Swing	N/A	

South West (7771)
Party	Candidate	Votes	%	±%
Labour	Hall M.*	2,004	60.4	−3.2
Alliance	Hallam D.	789	23.8	−12.6
Conservative	Carrington J.	527	15.9	+15.9
Majority		1,215	36.6	+9.4
Turnout		3,320	42.7	+3.0
Labour hold		Swing	+4.7	

Wombwell North (5384)
Party	Candidate	Votes	%	±%
Labour	Wraith D.*	1,463	76.1	+10.8
Independent	Shaw D. Ms.	459	23.9	−10.8
Majority		1,004	52.2	+21.5
Turnout		1,922	35.7	+6.0
Labour hold		Swing	+10.8	

Wombwell South (8195)
Party	Candidate	Votes	%	±%
Labour	Wake J.*	2,143	55.3	−6.3
Independent	Rudkin E.	1,735	44.7	+6.3
Majority		408	10.5	−12.5
Turnout		3,878	47.3	+2.4
Labour hold		Swing	-6.3	

Worsbrough (8129)
Party	Candidate	Votes	%	±%
Labour	Wright F.	2,449	81.4	N/A
Conservative	Elders E. Ms.	558	18.6	N/A
Majority		1,891	62.9	N/A
Turnout		3,007	37.0	N/A
Labour hold		Swing	N/A	
