= 1976 Barnsley Metropolitan Borough Council election =

1976 local election in England

← 1975	6 May 1976	1978 →

One third of seats (20 of 60) to Barnsley Metropolitan Borough Council 31 seats needed for a majority
	First party	Second party	Third party
Party	Labour	Residents	Liberal
Seats won	11	5	3
Seat change	▼9	▲5	▲3
Majority party before election
Labour
Majority party after election
Labour

Elections to Barnsley Metropolitan Borough Council were held on 6 May 1976, with one third of council up for election. The election resulted in Labour retaining control of the council.

== Election result ==
Barnsley Metropolitan Borough Council Election Result 1976
Party	Seats	Gains	Losses	Net gain/loss	Seats %	Votes %	Votes	+/−
Labour	11	0	9	-9	55.0	48.0	29,255	-4.5
Residents	5	5	0	+5	25.0	30.1	18,369	+3.3
Liberal	3	3	0	+3	15.0	11.5	7,027	-5.6
Independent Labour	1	1	0	+1	5.0	2.4	1,436	-1.1
Conservative	0	0	0	0	0.0	8.6	3,976	-2.1
Independent	0	0	0	0	0.0	1.5	925	+0.2

This resulted in the following composition of the council:

Party	Previous council	New council
Labour	48	39
Residents	6	11
Liberals	2	5
Independent Labour	1	2
Conservatives	1	1
Democratic Labour	1	1
Independent	1	1
Total	60	60
Working majority	36	18

== Ward results ==
+/- figures represent changes from the last time these wards were contested.

Ardsley (7236)
Party	Candidate	Votes	%	±%
Labour	Galvin T.*	1,108	52.0	+1.1
Residents	Sykes	773	36.3	+2.8
Conservative	Kitching A.	249	11.7	−3.9
Majority		335	15.7	−1.7
Turnout		2,130	29.4	+4.5
Labour hold		Swing	-0.8	

No. 1 (Barnsley: Carlton) (10201)
Party	Candidate	Votes	%	±%
Labour	Bright G.*	1,649	68.1	+11.6
Residents	Hayward	774	31.9	−1.3
Majority		875	36.2	+12.9
Turnout		2,423	23.8	+5.7
Labour hold		Swing	+6.4	

No. 2 (Barnsley: East & North) (8459)
Party	Candidate	Votes	%	±%
Labour	Kaye F.*	1,641	45.2	+8.1
Residents	Ward	1,477	40.7	−1.8
Conservative	Guest M.	510	14.1	+4.6
Majority		164	4.5	−0.8
Turnout		3,628	42.9	+4.4
Labour hold		Swing	+4.9	

No. 3 (Barnsley: Central-South-South East)(9594)
Party	Candidate	Votes	%	±%
Labour	Warden R.*	1,763	49.3	−3.2
Liberal	Jepson G.	996	27.8	+27.8
Residents	Spencer	492	13.7	−20.2
Conservative	England	328	9.2	−4.4
Majority		767	21.4	+2.9
Turnout		3,579	37.3	+14.8
Labour hold		Swing	-15.5	

No. 4 (Barnsley: South West and West) (7682)
Party	Candidate	Votes	%	±%
Residents	Pemberton	1,808	52.8	+1.4
Labour	Sinfield W.*	1,259	36.7	+4.3
Conservative	Oldfield H.	360	10.5	+6.3
Majority		549	16.0	−2.9
Turnout		3,427	44.6	+4.0
Residents gain from Labour		Swing	-1.4	

No. 5 (Barnsley: Monk Bretton) (9103)
Party	Candidate	Votes	%	±%
Labour	Whyke G.*	1,565	50.1	+14.6
Residents	Robinson	1,224	39.2	−13.4
Conservative	Copeland	334	10.7	+1.9
Majority		341	10.9	−6.2
Turnout		3,123	34.3	+8.8
Labour hold		Swing	+14.0	

No. 7 (Cudworth) (6262)
Party	Candidate	Votes	%	±%
Residents	Green	1,370	56.8	−0.2
Labour	Rigby R.*	1,041	43.2	+0.2
Majority		329	13.6	−0.4
Turnout		2,411	38.5	+6.1
Residents gain from Labour		Swing	-0.2	

No. 8 (Darfield) (5900)
Party	Candidate	Votes	%	±%
Labour	Key B.*	1,617	63.3	+28.5
Residents	O'Donnell	936	36.7	−4.8
Majority		681	26.7	+20.1
Turnout		2,553	43.3	+4.8
Labour hold		Swing	+16.6	

No. 9 (Dodworth-Barugh-Higham-Gawber)(6324)
Party	Candidate	Votes	%	±%
Labour	Brown D.*	1,202	42.3	−11.1
Residents	Addison	1,027	36.2	+23.5
Liberal	Crosby J.	611	21.5	−12.4
Majority		175	6.2	−13.4
Turnout		2,840	44.9	+1.3
Labour hold		Swing	-17.3	

No. 10 (Darton) (8997)
Party	Candidate	Votes	%	±%
Residents	Hutchinson	1,745	53.2	−3.2
Labour	Bretton W.*	1,532	46.8	+12.6
Majority		213	6.4	−15.8
Turnout		3,277	36.4	+4.1
Residents gain from Labour		Swing	-7.9	

No. 11 (Dearne: Central & South) (9945)
Party	Candidate	Votes	%	±%
Independent Labour	Gregory	1,436	46.2	N/A
Labour	Sayles	1,240	39.9	N/A
Residents	Barwell	435	14.0	N/A
Majority		196	6.3	N/A
Turnout		3,111	31.3	N/A
Independent Labour gain from Labour		Swing	N/A	

No. 12 (Dearne: East & West) (7436)
Party	Candidate	Votes	%	±%
Labour	Lloyd D.*	1,496	82.3	+9.4
Residents	Lowe	322	17.7	+17.7
Majority		1,174	64.6	+5.9
Turnout		1,818	24.4	+3.7
Labour hold		Swing	-4.1	

No. 13 (Hoyland Nether) (11398)
Party	Candidate	Votes	%	±%
Labour	McKay A.*	2,726	58.3	+12.6
Residents	Lockwood	1,949	41.7	+41.7
Majority		777	16.6	+8.1
Turnout		4,675	41.0	+9.6
Labour hold		Swing	-14.5	

No. 14 (Penistone) (6014)
Party	Candidate	Votes	%	±%
Liberal	Lockwood	1,257	36.3	−27.2
Independent	Lee	925	26.7	+26.7
Labour	Murphy W.*	841	24.3	+4.0
Conservative	Kellett	374	10.8	−5.4
Residents	Dalby	65	1.9	+1.9
Majority		332	9.6	−33.6
Turnout		3,462	57.6	+2.0
Liberal gain from Labour		Swing	-26.9	

No. 15 (Royston) (6456)
Party	Candidate	Votes	%	±%
Labour	Rispin K.*	1,670	57.7	+20.0
Liberal	Whitehead E.	1,063	36.7	+36.7
Residents	Cawthorn	163	5.6	+5.6
Majority		607	21.0	−3.7
Turnout		2,896	44.9	+1.8
Labour hold		Swing	-8.3	

No. 16 (Wombwell: Central-North-South East)(5382)
Party	Candidate	Votes	%	±%
Residents	Wraith	799	57.6	+24.3
Labour	Jones C.*	588	42.4	+1.0
Majority		211	15.2	+7.1
Turnout		1,387	25.8	+0.7
Residents gain from Labour		Swing	+11.6	

No. 17 (Wombwell: Hemingfield and SouthWest) (7441)
Party	Candidate	Votes	%	±%
Liberal	Hargreaves	1,707	55.5	+17.7
Labour	Brookes H.*	1,368	44.5	−0.5
Majority		339	11.0	+3.9
Turnout		3,075	41.3	+5.7
Liberal gain from Labour		Swing	+9.1	

No. 18 (Worsbrough) (11257)
Party	Candidate	Votes	%	±%
Residents	Batty	2,275	53.0	+16.3
Labour	Schofield*	2,017	47.0	−7.1
Majority		258	6.0	−11.4
Turnout		4,292	38.1	+7.4
Residents gain from Labour		Swing	+11.7	

No. 19 (Hemsworth Rural) (8938)
Party	Candidate	Votes	%	±%
Labour	Stacey N.*	1,752	58.9	+2.6
Residents	McKernan	735	24.7	−4.1
Conservative	Schofield D. Ms.	486	16.3	+1.5
Majority		1,017	34.2	+6.7
Turnout		2,973	33.3	+6.6
Labour hold		Swing	+3.3	

No. 20 (Penistone Rural & Wortley) (7257)
Party	Candidate	Votes	%	±%
Liberal	Frow	1,393	35.6	+4.7
Conservative	Wade J.	1,335	34.2	−5.6
Labour	Ellis W.*	1,180	30.2	+0.8
Majority		213	1.5	−3.3
Turnout		3,908	53.9	+7.1
Liberal gain from Labour		Swing	+5.1	
