= 1973 Barnsley Metropolitan Borough Council election =

1973 local election in England

← 1972	10 May 1973	1975 →

All 60 seats to Barnsley Metropolitan Borough Council 31 seats needed for a majority
	First party	Second party	Third party
Party	Labour	Independent	Democratic Labour
Seats won	57	1	1
Seat change	Steady	Steady	Steady
Majority party before election
Labour
Majority party after election
Labour

The first elections to the newly created Barnsley Metropolitan Borough Council were held on 10 May 1973, with the entirety of the 60 seat council - three seats for each of the 20 wards - up for vote. The Local Government Act 1972 stipulated that the elected members were to shadow and eventually take over from the predecessor corporation on 1 April 1974. The order in which the councillors were elected dictated their term serving, with third-place candidates serving two years and up for re-election in 1975, second-placed three years expiring in 1976 and 1st-placed five years until 1978.

The election resulted in Labour gaining control of the council.

== Election result ==
Barnsley Metropolitan Borough Council Election Result 1973
Party	Seats	Gains	Losses	Net gain/loss	Seats %	Votes %	Votes	+/−
Labour	57	0	0	0	95.0	52.5	32,319	N/A
Independent	1	0	0	0	1.7	7.7	4,727	N/A
Democratic Labour	1	0	0	0	1.7	6.0	3,687	N/A
Independent Labour	1	0	0	0	1.7	5.0	3,062	N/A
Conservative	0	0	0	0	0.0	9.7	5,977	N/A
Liberal	0	0	0	0	0.0	9.2	5,679	N/A
Citizens	0	0	0	0	0.0	3.4	2,090	N/A
Residents	0	0	0	0	0.0	2.2	1,329	N/A
Independent Socialist	0	0	0	0	0.0	1.4	850	N/A
Socialist (GB)	0	0	0	0	0.0	1.6	978	N/A
Communist	0	0	0	0	0.0	1.4	844	N/A

This resulted in the following composition of the council:

Party	New council
Labour	57
Democratic Labour	1
Independent	1
Independent Labour	1
Total	60
Working majority	54

== Ward results ==
Ardsley (7210)
Party	Candidate	Votes	%	±%
Labour	Varley B.	1,305	78.5	N/A
Labour	Galvin T.	1,281		
Labour	Burns J.	1,188		
Democratic Labour	Wilkinson G.	358	21.5	N/A
Majority		947	56.9	N/A
Turnout		1,663	23.1	N/A
Labour win (new seat)				
Labour win (new seat)				
Labour win (new seat)				

No. 1 (Barnsley: Carlton) (10165)
Party	Candidate	Votes	%	±%
Labour	Brain H.	1,670	75.8	N/A
Labour	Bright G.	1,545		
Labour	Dancer H.	1,347		
Communist	Greenfield N.	269	12.2	N/A
Conservative	Carrington J.	264	12.0	N/A
Majority		1,401	63.6	N/A
Turnout		2,203	21.7	N/A
Labour win (new seat)				
Labour win (new seat)				
Labour win (new seat)				

No. 2 (Barnsley: East & North) (8770)
Party	Candidate	Votes	%	±%
Labour	Williams A.	1,833	59.0	N/A
Labour	Kaye F.	1,779		
Labour	Fisher R.	1,772		
Citizens	Williams R.	879	28.3	N/A
Citizens	Acklam T.	801		
Citizens	Ware D.	728		
Conservative	Walker G.	393	12.7	N/A
Conservative	Jones R.	391		
Majority		954	30.7	N/A
Turnout		3,105	35.4	N/A
Labour win (new seat)				
Labour win (new seat)				
Labour win (new seat)				

No. 3 (Barnsley: Central-South-South East)(9807)
Party	Candidate	Votes	%	±%
Labour	Lunn F.	2,339	60.1	N/A
Labour	Warden R.	2,015		
Labour	Borrett K.	1,928		
Liberal	Dossett J.	1,260	32.4	N/A
Liberal	Jepson G.	1,214		
Liberal	Copley M.	1,176		
Conservative	Mallison S.	290	7.5	N/A
Majority		1,079	27.7	N/A
Turnout		3,889	39.7	N/A
Labour win (new seat)				
Labour win (new seat)				
Labour win (new seat)				

No. 4 (Barnsley: South West and West) (7981)
Party	Candidate	Votes	%	±%
Labour	Lindley T.	1,623	51.7	N/A
Labour	Sinfield W.	1,566		
Labour	Butler A.	1,484		
Citizens	Blackburne E.	1,211	38.6	N/A
Citizens	Shaw K.	1,151		
Citizens	Gibson M.	1,066		
Conservative	Oldfield H.	304	9.7	N/A
Conservative	England G.	291		
Conservative	Winter S.	221		
Majority		412	13.1	N/A
Turnout		3,138	39.3	N/A
Labour win (new seat)				
Labour win (new seat)				
Labour win (new seat)				

No. 5 (Barnsley: Monk Bretton) (10034)
Party	Candidate	Votes	%	±%
Labour	Tracey M.	1,604	72.2	N/A
Labour	Whyke G.	1,530		
Labour	Wilkie B.	1,461		
Conservative	Strange T.	363	16.3	N/A
Independent Socialist	Cooke L.	255	11.5	N/A
Majority		1,241	55.9	N/A
Turnout		2,222	22.1	N/A
Labour win (new seat)				
Labour win (new seat)				
Labour win (new seat)				

No. 7 (Cudworth) (6146)
Party	Candidate	Votes	%	±%
Labour	Bateman B.	Unopposed	N/A	N/A
Labour	Glover M.	Unopposed	N/A	N/A
Labour	Rigby R.	Unopposed	N/A	N/A
Labour win (new seat)				
Labour win (new seat)				
Labour win (new seat)				

No. 8 (Darfield) (5716)
Party	Candidate	Votes	%	±%
Labour	Key B.	Unopposed	N/A	N/A
Labour	Brookes W.	Unopposed	N/A	N/A
Labour	Goddard B.	Unopposed	N/A	N/A
Labour win (new seat)				
Labour win (new seat)				
Labour win (new seat)				

No. 9 (Dodworth-Barugh-Higham-Gawber)(6400)
Party	Candidate	Votes	%	±%
Labour	Mason G.	1,762	61.1	N/A
Labour	Brown D.	1,677		
Labour	Woffenden J.	1,666		
Liberal	Crosby J.	1,121	38.9	N/A
Liberal	Hodnett M.	991		
Majority		641	22.2	N/A
Turnout		2,883	45.0	N/A
Labour win (new seat)				
Labour win (new seat)				
Labour win (new seat)				

No. 10 (Darton) (8518)
Party	Candidate	Votes	%	±%
Labour	Booth D.	1,457	38.2	N/A
Labour	Bretton W.	1,411		
Labour	Turner C.	1,266		
Independent	Skelton G.	719	18.8	N/A
Independent Labour	Ledger V.	662	17.3	N/A
Conservative	Bower J.	590	15.5	N/A
Democratic Labour	Hesford K.	390	10.2	N/A
Majority		738	19.3	N/A
Turnout		3,818	44.8	N/A
Labour win (new seat)				
Labour win (new seat)				
Labour win (new seat)				

No. 11 (Dearne: Central & South) (9844)
Party	Candidate	Votes	%	±%
Labour	Bedford J.	2,227	69.5	N/A
Labour	Grayson J.	2,164		
Labour	Stanley J.	2,038		
Socialist (GB)	Doyle P.	978	30.5	N/A
Majority		1,249	39.0	N/A
Turnout		3,205	32.6	N/A
Labour win (new seat)				
Labour win (new seat)				
Labour win (new seat)				

No. 12 (Dearne: East & West) (7643)
Party	Candidate	Votes	%	±%
Labour	Oldham J.	1,648	57.9	N/A
Labour	Lloyd D.	1,520		
Labour	Young K.	1,334		
Communist	Riley P.	575	20.2	N/A
Residents	Lamplough J.	441	15.5	N/A
Residents	Imisson P.	288		
Residents	Wood H.	198		
Conservative	Crofts G.	181	6.4	N/A
Majority		1,073	37.7	N/A
Turnout		2,845	37.2	N/A
Labour win (new seat)				
Labour win (new seat)				
Labour win (new seat)				

No. 13 (Hoyland Nether) (11463)
Party	Candidate	Votes	%	±%
Democratic Labour	Eadon D.	2,939	41.1	N/A
Labour	McKay A.	2,535	35.4	N/A
Labour	Ashmore J.	2,270		
Labour	Smith H.	1,913		
Independent Labour	Levitt L.	1,677	23.5	N/A
Majority		404	5.6	N/A
Turnout		7,151	62.4	N/A
Democratic Labour win (new seat)				
Labour win (new seat)				
Labour win (new seat)				

No. 14 (Penistone) (6189)
Party	Candidate	Votes	%	±%
Independent	Gledhill W.	1,476	40.4	N/A
Labour	Murphy W.	1,225	33.5	N/A
Labour	Ashton F.	1,078		
Labour	Fielding A.	969		
Conservative	Hincliffe T.	955	26.1	N/A
Conservative	Atkinson J.	840		
Independent	Smythe R.	831		
Conservative	White A.	721		
Majority		251	6.9	N/A
Turnout		3,656	59.1	N/A
Independent win (new seat)				
Labour win (new seat)				
Labour win (new seat)				

No. 15 (Royston) (6344)
Party	Candidate	Votes	%	±%
Labour	Ball T.	1,527	31.8	N/A
Labour	Rispin K.	1,348		
Independent Labour	Parkes E.	1,289	26.9	N/A
Labour	Moon F.	1,102		
Liberal	Whitehead E.	1,092	22.8	N/A
Residents	Hawkes L.	888	18.5	N/A
Majority		238	5.0	N/A
Turnout		4,796	75.6	N/A
Labour win (new seat)				
Labour win (new seat)				
Independent Labour win (new seat)				

No. 16 (Wombwell: Central-North-South East)(5293)
Party	Candidate	Votes	%	±%
Labour	Fellows B.	735	66.0	N/A
Labour	Jones C.	711		
Labour	Storey A.	682		
Independent Labour	Rose R.	378	34.0	N/A
Independent Labour	Buckley R.	329		
Independent Labour	Shepherd C.	273		
Majority		357	32.0	N/A
Turnout		1,113	21.0	N/A
Labour win (new seat)				
Labour win (new seat)				
Labour win (new seat)				

No. 17 (Wombwell: Hemingfield and SouthWest) (7785)
Party	Candidate	Votes	%	±%
Labour	Wake J.	1,699	69.9	N/A
Labour	Brookes H.	1,627		
Labour	Naylor T.	1,548		
Independent Labour	Wilkinson H.	733	30.1	N/A
Independent Labour	McNally J.	495		
Independent Labour	Sanders J.	424		
Majority		966	39.8	N/A
Turnout		2,432	31.2	N/A
Labour win (new seat)				
Labour win (new seat)				
Labour win (new seat)				

No. 18 (Worsbrough) (11229)
Party	Candidate	Votes	%	±%
Labour	Bland J.	3,183	63.7	N/A
Labour	Scholfield A.	3,140		
Labour	Smith W.	3,127		
Liberal	Vallance J.	1,081	21.6	N/A
Conservative	Wigglesworth E.	733	14.7	N/A
Majority		2,102	42.1	N/A
Turnout		4,997	44.5	N/A
Labour win (new seat)				
Labour win (new seat)				
Labour win (new seat)				

No. 19 (Hemsworth Rural) (9031)
Party	Candidate	Votes	%	±%
Labour	Nettleton H.	2,336	52.7	N/A
Labour	Stacey N.	2,282		
Labour	Baines D.	2,137		
Independent	Newsome C.	855	19.3	N/A
Conservative	Gardner W.	650	14.7	N/A
Independent Socialist	Short J.	595	13.4	N/A
Independent Socialist	Turner R.	524		
Majority		1,481	33.4	N/A
Turnout		4,436	49.1	N/A
Labour win (new seat)				
Labour win (new seat)				
Labour win (new seat)				

No. 20 (Penistone Rural & Wortley) (7218)
Party	Candidate	Votes	%	±%
Labour	Fish H.	1,611	40.4	N/A
Labour	Ellis W.	1,487		
Labour	Hirst E.	1,378		
Conservative	Beever L.	1,254	31.4	N/A
Liberal	Lees J.	1,125	28.2	N/A
Conservative	Wade J.	1,068		
Liberal	Warburton J.	1,035		
Conservative	Harrison C.	1,035		
Liberal	Illingworth F.	844		
Majority		357	8.9	N/A
Turnout		3,990	55.3	N/A
Labour win (new seat)				
Labour win (new seat)				
Labour win (new seat)				
