= 1983 Barnsley Metropolitan Borough Council election =

1983 local election in England

- 5 May 1983

One third of seats (22 of 66) to Barnsley Metropolitan Borough Council 34 seats needed for a majority
	First party	Second party	Third party
Party	Labour	Conservative	Residents
Seats won	20	1	1
Seat change	▲5	Steady	▼3
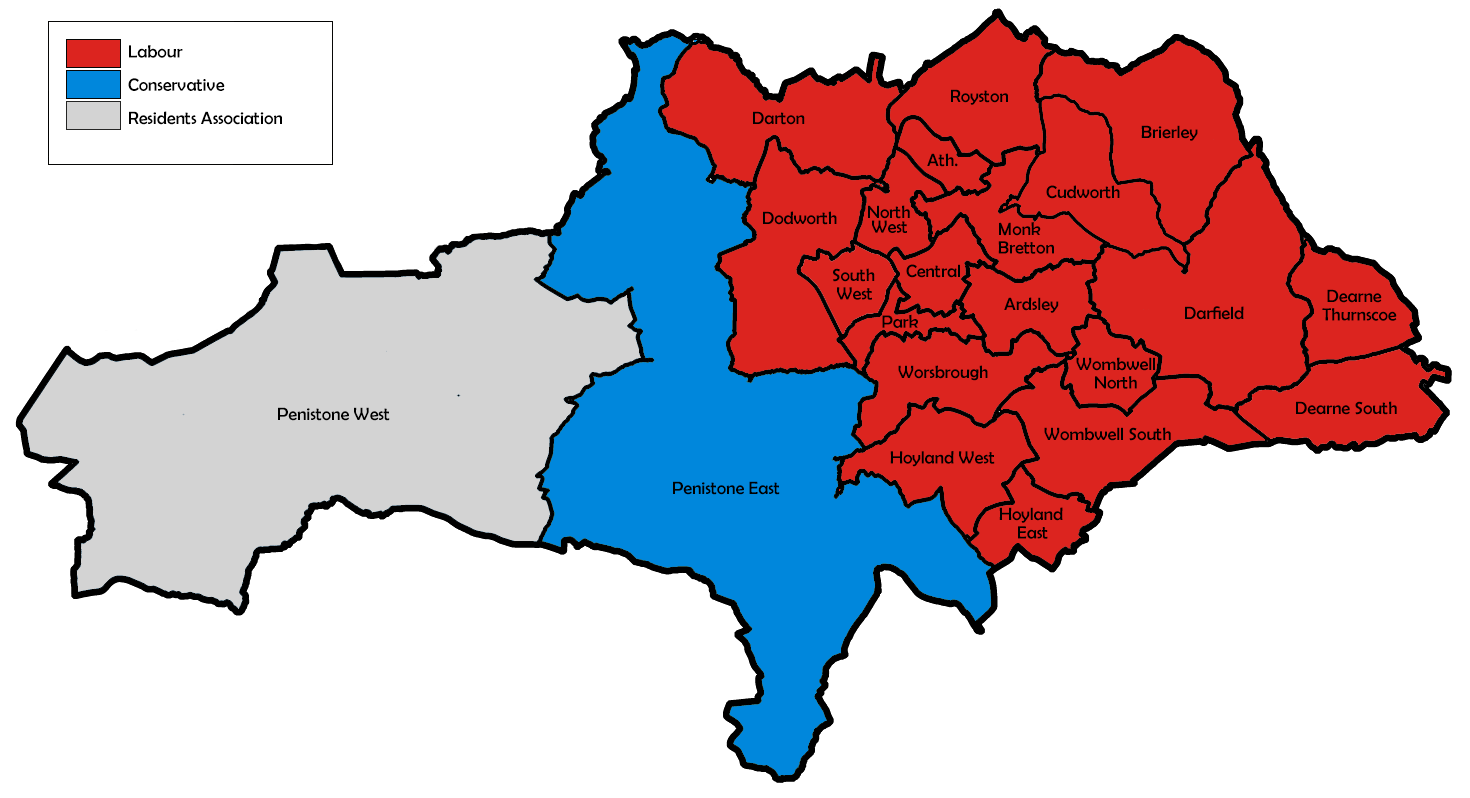
- Map showing the results of the 1983 Barnsley council elections.
Majority party before election
Labour
Majority party after election
Labour

Elections to Barnsley Metropolitan Borough Council were held on 5 May 1983. One third of the council was up for election. Prior to the election the defending councillor in Darton had defected to Independent Labour from Residents. The election resulted in Labour retaining control of the council.

== Election result ==
Barnsley Metropolitan Borough Council Election Result 1983
Party	Seats	Gains	Losses	Net gain/loss	Seats %	Votes %	Votes	+/−
Labour	20	5	0	+5	90.9	62.3	42,652	+7.1
Conservative	1	1	0	0	4.5	9.7	6,621	+0.8
Residents	1	0	3	-3	4.5	5.7	3,907	-0.8
Alliance	0	0	2	-2	0.0	18.7	12,835	-8.8
Independent	0	0	0	0	0.0	2.3	1,563	+2.3
Independent Labour	0	0	1	-1	0.0	1.3	919	-0.8

This resulted in the following composition of the council:

Party	Previous council	New council
Labour	53	58
Conservatives	2	3
Residents	6	3
SDP–Liberal Alliance	4	2
Independent Labour	1	0
Total	66	66
Working majority	40	50

== Ward results ==
+/- figures represent changes from the last time these wards were contested.

Ardsley (7598)
Party	Candidate	Votes	%	±%
Labour	Galvin E.*	1,603	76.3	+11.4
Conservative	Dobbin J.	499	23.7	+9.3
Majority		1,104	52.5	+8.4
Turnout		2,102	27.7	+0.7
Labour hold		Swing	+1.0	

Athersley (7196)
Party	Candidate	Votes	%	±%
Labour	Kyte G.	1,820	84.4	+4.9
Alliance	Linstead M. Ms.	336	15.6	+2.9
Majority		1,484	68.8	+2.0
Turnout		2,156	30.0	+5.2
Labour hold		Swing	+1.0	

Brierley (7424)
Party	Candidate	Votes	%	±%
Labour	Baines D.*	2,119	83.5	+10.9
Conservative	Schofield D. Ms.	420	16.5	+6.5
Majority		1,699	66.9	+11.8
Turnout		2,539	34.2	+3.8
Labour hold		Swing	+2.2	

Central (8336)
Party	Candidate	Votes	%	±%
Labour	Fisher R.*	2,109	59.5	+4.4
Alliance	Taylor M. Ms.	1,160	32.7	−0.5
Conservative	Gibson L.	273	7.7	−3.9
Majority			26.8	+4.9
Turnout		3,542	42.5	+3.5
Labour hold		Swing	+2.4	

Cudworth (7788)
Party	Candidate	Votes	%	±%
Labour	Salt H.*	2,027	67.0	+22.2
Residents	Dempsey F.	999	33.0	−15.0
Majority		1,028	34.0	+30.8
Turnout		3,026	38.9	+2.9
Labour hold		Swing	+18.6	

Darfield (7989)
Party	Candidate	Votes	%	±%
Labour	Goddard B.*	2,290	77.4	−2.5
Alliance	Smailes M. Ms.	667	22.6	+2.5
Majority		1,623	54.9	−5.0
Turnout		2,957	37.0	+4.7
Labour hold		Swing	-2.5	

Darton (9116)
Party	Candidate	Votes	%	±%
Labour	Norbury W.	1,815	44.8	−1.3
Alliance	Evans J.	1,497	36.9	−2.4
Conservative	Slater A.	469	11.6	−3.0
Independent Labour	Hutchinson M.*	273	6.7	+.7
Majority		318	7.8	+1.1
Turnout		4,054	44.5	+7.6
Labour gain from Independent Labour		Swing	+0.5	

Dearne South (9040)
Party	Candidate	Votes	%	±%
Labour	Stanley J.*	2,381	78.7	+29.8
Independent Labour	Gregory J.	646	21.3	−20.5
Majority		1,735	57.3	+50.3
Turnout		3,027	33.5	+6.1
Labour hold		Swing	+25.1	

Dearne Thurnscoe (8555)
Party	Candidate	Votes	%	±%
Labour	Lowe J.	2,247	86.1	+13.5
Alliance	Gaunt W.	363	13.9	−13.5
Majority		1,884	72.2	+27.0
Turnout		2,610	30.5	−0.2
Labour hold		Swing	+13.5	

Dodworth (8345)
Party	Candidate	Votes	%	±%
Labour	Cawthrow C.	2,424	62.2	+12.6
Alliance	Chamberlain D.	997	25.6	−5.2
Conservative	Colquhoun G.	477	12.2	+12.2
Majority		1,427	36.6	+17.8
Turnout		3,898	46.7	+3.8
Labour hold		Swing	+8.9	

Hoyland East (7971)
Party	Candidate	Votes	%	±%
Labour	Levitt L.	1,628	53.6	+12.9
Alliance	Eaden D.*	1,408	46.4	−12.9
Majority		220	7.2	−11.3
Turnout		3,036	38.1	+2.2
Labour gain from Alliance		Swing	+12.9	

Hoyland West (6887)
Party	Candidate	Votes	%	±%
Labour	Schofield A.*	2,201	71.9	+6.7
Alliance	Chantry J.	862	28.1	−6.7
Majority		1,339	43.7	+13.5
Turnout		3,063	44.5	+5.9
Labour hold		Swing	+6.7	

Monk Bretton (8978)
Party	Candidate	Votes	%	±%
Labour	Barron R.*	2,384	77.6	+7.5
Conservative	White J.	425	13.8	+1.0
Alliance	Major C.	265	8.6	−8.5
Majority		1,959	63.7	+10.8
Turnout		3,074	34.2	+3.3
Labour hold		Swing	+3.2	

North West (7774)
Party	Candidate	Votes	%	±%
Labour	Hadfield P.	1,783	55.9	+7.5
Residents	Harris J.*	587	18.4	+6.8
Conservative	Jubb M.	497	15.6	+1.1
Alliance	Appleyard J. Ms.	325	10.2	−15.5
Majority		1,196	37.5	+14.8
Turnout		3,192	41.1	+0.8
Labour gain from Residents		Swing	+0.3	

Park (6030)
Party	Candidate	Votes	%	±%
Labour	Lunn F.*	1,963	73.4	+6.2
Conservative	Sykes P.	444	16.6	+4.1
Alliance	Smailes J.	268	10.0	−10.4
Majority		1,519	56.8	+10.0
Turnout		2,675	44.4	+6.9
Labour hold		Swing	+1.0	

Penistone East (6742)
Party	Candidate	Votes	%	±%
Conservative	Wade J.	1,506	44.6	+13.5
Labour	Hunter D.	1,215	36.0	+6.4
Alliance	Hanstock O.	656	19.4	−12.8
Majority		291	8.6	+7.5
Turnout		3,377	50.1	+6.0
Conservative gain from Alliance		Swing	+3.5	

Penistone West (7973)
Party	Candidate	Votes	%	±%
Residents	Harrison M. Ms.*	2,001	50.3	+22.6
Labour	Collett N. Ms.	838	21.1	+1.5
Conservative	Mitchell K. Ms.	779	19.6	−15.2
Alliance	Hallam D.	360	9.0	−8.9
Majority		1,163	29.2	+22.1
Turnout		3,978	49.9	+8.4
Residents hold		Swing	+10.5	

Royston (8318)
Party	Candidate	Votes	%	±%
Labour	Lavender H.	2,118	77.4	+6.6
Alliance	Wilson N.	618	22.6	−0.3
Majority		1,500	54.8	+6.9
Turnout		2,736	32.9	−6.2
Labour hold		Swing	+3.4	

South West (7581)
Party	Candidate	Votes	%	±%
Labour	Hall M.	1,707	43.1	+4.9
Alliance	Bickley K. Ms.	1,554	39.3	+3.5
Conservative	England G.	377	9.5	−2.2
Residents	Addison M. Ms.*	320	8.1	−6.2
Majority		153	3.9	+1.5
Turnout		3,958	52.2	+10.9
Labour gain from Residents		Swing	+0.7	

Wombwell North (5477)
Party	Candidate	Votes	%	±%
Labour	Wraith R.*	1,474	68.2	+15.6
Alliance	Calton W.	687	31.8	−15.6
Majority		787	36.4	+31.2
Turnout		2,161	39.5	+8.4
Labour hold		Swing	+15.6	

Wombwell South (7994)
Party	Candidate	Votes	%	±%
Labour	Wake J.*	1,820	50.3	−13.0
Independent	Mahatme S.	1,563	43.2	+43.2
Alliance	Young S. Ms.	236	6.5	−30.2
Majority		257	7.1	−19.4
Turnout		3,619	45.3	+12.5
Labour hold		Swing	-28.1	

Worsbrough (8349)
Party	Candidate	Votes	%	±%
Labour	Ingram W.	2,686	72.3	+9.7
Alliance	Price A. Ms.	576	15.5	−12.5
Conservative	Pappworth R.	455	12.2	+2.8
Majority		2,110	56.8	+22.3
Turnout		3,717	44.5	−1.4
Labour gain from Residents		Swing	+11.1	
