= List of elections in 2006 =

The following elections occurred in the year 2006.

- Elections in 2006
- Electoral calendar 2006
- 2006 Acehnese regional election
- 2006 American Samoan legislative election
- 2006 Bahraini parliamentary election
- 2006 Costa Rican municipal elections
- 2006 Costa Rican presidential election
- 2006 Fijian presidential election
- 2006 Fijian general election
- 2006 Georgian local elections
- 2006 Iranian Assembly of Experts election
- 2006 Iranian City and Village Councils elections
- 2006 Kuwaiti parliamentary election
- 2006 Matavera by-election
- 2006 Netherlands Antilles general election
- 2006 Palestinian legislative election
- 2006 Republic of China municipal elections
- 2006 Samoan general election
- 2006 Singaporean general election
- 2006 Solomon Islands general election
- 2006 Tajikistani presidential election
- 2006 Thai general election
- October 2006 Thai general election
- 2006 Thai local elections
- 2006 Transnistrian presidential election
- 2006 Tuvaluan general election
- 2006 United Arab Emirates parliamentary election
- 2006 United Nations Security Council election
- 2006 Yemeni presidential election

== Africa ==
- 2006 Beninese presidential election
- 2006 Cape Verdean parliamentary election
- 2006 Cape Verdean presidential election
- 2006 Chadian presidential election
- 2006 Comorian presidential election
- 2006 Democratic Republic of the Congo general election
- 2006 Gabonese legislative election
- 2006 Gambian presidential election
- 2006 Malagasy presidential election
- 2006 Mauritanian parliamentary election
- 2006 Mauritanian constitutional referendum
- 2006 São Tomé and Príncipe legislative election
- 2006 São Tomé and Príncipe presidential election
- 2006 Seychellois presidential election
- 2006 South African municipal election
- 2006 Ugandan general election
- 2006 Zambian general election

== Asia ==
- 2006 Bahraini parliamentary election
- 2006 Democratic Progressive Party chairmanship election
- 2006 Cypriot legislative election
- 2006 Iranian Assembly of Experts election
- 2006 Iranian City and Village Councils elections
- 2006 Israeli legislative election
- 2006 Kuwaiti parliamentary election
- 2006 Laotian parliamentary election
- 2006 Nagorno-Karabakh constitutional referendum
- 2006 Palestinian legislative election
- 2006 Republic of China municipal elections
- 2006 Singaporean general election
- 2006 South Korean local elections
- 2006 Tajikistani presidential election
- 2006 Thai general election
- October 2006 Thai general election
- 2006 Thai local elections
- 2006 United Arab Emirates parliamentary election
- 2006 Yemeni presidential election

=== Japan ===
- 2006 Fukagawa mayoral election
- 2006 Fukuoka mayoral election
- 2006 Fukushima gubernatorial election
- 2006 Higashiosaka by-election
- 2006 Higashiōsaka mayoral election
- 2006 Ishikawa gubernatorial election
- 2006 Kumamoto mayoral election
- 2006 Liberal Democratic Party (Japan) leadership election
- 2006 Naha local election
- 2006 Niigata mayoral election
- 2006 Okinawan gubernatorial election
- 2006 Sanjo mayoral election
- 2006 Shiga gubernatorial election
- 2006 Shinagawa mayoral election
- 2006 Shinjuku mayoral election
- 2006 Wakayama gubernatorial election

=== Malaysia ===
- 2006 Sarawak state election

=== Philippines ===
- 2006 Dinagat Islands creation plebiscite
- 2006 Shariff Kabunsuan creation plebiscite

=== Russia ===
- Elections in Astrakhan Oblast

== Europe ==
- 2006 Alderney election
- 2006 Belarusian presidential election
- 2006 Belgian provincial and municipal elections
- 2006 Bosnia and Herzegovina general election
- 2006 Bulgarian presidential election
- 2006 Czech Senate election
- 2006 Czech legislative election
- 2006 Czech municipal elections
- 2006 Dutch municipal elections
- 2006 Estonian presidential election
- 2006 Finnish presidential election
- 2006 Georgian local elections
- Gibraltar Constitution Order 2006
- 2006 Greek local elections
- 2006 Hungarian parliamentary election
- 2006 Italian local elections
- 2006 Ivano-Frankivsk Oblast local election
- 2006 Latvian parliamentary election
- 2006 Macedonian parliamentary election
- 2006 Maltese local elections
- 2006 Manx general election
- 2006 Montenegrin parliamentary election
- 2006 Nagorno-Karabakh constitutional referendum
- 2006 Polish local elections
- 2006 Portuguese presidential election
- 2006 Progressive Democrats leadership election
- 2006 Sammarinese general election
- 2006 Serbian constitutional referendum
- 2006–07 Serbian local elections
- 2006 Slovak parliamentary election
- 2006 Stockholm municipal election
- 2006 Swedish general election
- 2006 Ukrainian local elections
- 2006 Ukrainian parliamentary election

=== Austria ===
- 2006 Austrian legislative election

=== Germany ===
- 2006 Baden-Württemberg state election
- 2006 Berlin state election
- 2006 Mecklenburg-Vorpommern state election
- 2006 Rhineland-Palatinate state election
- 2006 Saxony-Anhalt state election

=== Italy ===
- 2006 Italian general election
  - 2006 Italian general election in Aosta Valley
  - 2006 Italian Senate election in Lombardy
  - 2006 Italian general election in Sardinia
  - 2006 Italian general election in Trentino-Alto Adige/Südtirol
  - 2006 Italian general election in Veneto
- 2006 Italian local elections
- 2006 Italian presidential election
- 2006 Italian constitutional referendum
- 2006 Molise regional election
- 2006 Sicilian regional election

=== Moldova ===
- 2006 Transnistrian independence referendum
- 2006 Transnistrian presidential election

=== Netherlands ===
- 2006 Democrats 66 leadership election
- 2006 Dutch general election
- 2006 Dutch municipal elections
- 2006 VVD leadership election

=== Russia ===
- Elections in Astrakhan Oblast

=== Spain ===
- 2006 Catalan parliamentary election
- 2006 Catalan constitutional referendum

=== Switzerland ===
- 2006 Swiss Federal Council election

=== United Kingdom ===
- 2006 Blaenau Gwent by-elections
- 2006 Bromley and Chislehurst by-election
- 2006 Dunfermline and West Fife by-election
- 2006 Liberal Democrats deputy leadership election
- 2006 Liberal Democrats leadership election
- 2006 United Kingdom local elections
- 2006 Moray by-election
- 2006 UK Independence Party leadership election

==== United Kingdom local ====
- 2006 United Kingdom local elections

===== English local =====
- 2006 Adur Council election
- 2006 Amber Valley Council election
- 2006 Barnet Council election
- 2006 Barrow-in-Furness Council election
- 2006 Bassetlaw Council election
- 2006 Blackburn with Darwen Council election
- 2006 Bolton Council election
- 2006 Brent Council election
- 2006 Brentwood Council election
- 2006 Bromley Council election
- 2006 Broxbourne Council election
- 2006 Burnley Council election
- 2006 Calderdale Council election
- 2006 Cambridge Council election
- 2006 Camden Council election
- 2006 Cheltenham Council election
- 2006 Cherwell Council election
- 2006 Chorley Council election
- 2006 Colchester Council election
- 2006 Coventry Council election
- 2006 Craven Council election
- 2006 Croydon Council election
- 2006 Daventry Council election
- 2006 Derby Council election
- 2006 Eastleigh Council election
- 2006 Ellesmere Port and Neston Council election
- 2006 Epping Forest Council election
- 2006 Fareham Council election
- 2006 Gateshead Council election
- 2006 Gosport Council election
- 2006 Greenwich Council election
- 2006 Hackney Council election
- 2006 Halton Council election
- 2006 Hammersmith and Fulham council election
- 2006 Haringey Council election
- 2006 Harlow Council election
- 2006 Hart Council election
- 2006 Hastings Council election
- 2006 Hull Council election
- 2006 Hyndburn Council election
- 2006 Ipswich Borough Council election
- 2006 Islington Council election
- 2006 Kingston upon Thames Council election
- 2006 Knowsley Council election
- 2006 Lambeth Council election
- 2006 Lewisham Council election
- 2006 Liverpool Council election
- 2006 London local elections
- 2006 Macclesfield Council election
- 2006 Manchester Council election
- 2006 Mole Valley Council election
- 2006 Newcastle-under-Lyme Council election
- 2006 Newham Council election
- 2006 North Tyneside Council election
- 2006 Nuneaton and Bedworth Council election
- 2006 Oxford City Council election
- 2006 Penwith Council election
- 2006 Portsmouth Council election
- 2006 Preston Council election
- 2006 Purbeck Council election
- 2006 Redbridge Council election
- 2006 Redditch Council election
- 2006 Richmond upon Thames Council election
- 2006 Rochdale Council election
- 2006 Rochford Council election
- 2006 Rossendale Council election
- 2006 Runnymede Council election
- 2006 Rushmoor Council election
- 2006 Salford Council election
- 2006 Sefton Council election
- 2006 Sheffield Council election
- 2006 Slough Council election
- 2006 South Lakeland Council election
- 2006 South Tyneside Council election
- 2006 Southend-on-Sea Council election
- 2006 Southwark Council election
- 2006 St Albans Council election
- 2006 St Helens Council election
- 2006 Stevenage Council election
- 2006 Stratford-on-Avon Council election
- 2006 Swindon Council election
- 2006 Tamworth Council election
- 2006 Tandridge Council election
- 2006 Three Rivers Council election
- 2006 Thurrock Council election
- 2006 Tower Hamlets Council election
- 2006 Trafford Council election
- 2006 Tunbridge Wells Council election
- 2006 Wakefield Council election
- 2006 Waltham Forest Council election
- 2006 Wandsworth Council election
- 2006 Watford Council election
- 2006 Welwyn Hatfield Council election
- 2006 West Lancashire Council election
- 2006 West Lindsey Council election
- 2006 Weymouth and Portland Council election
- 2006 Wigan Council election
- 2006 Winchester Council election
- 2006 Wirral Council election
- 2006 Woking Council election
- 2006 Wokingham Council election
- 2006 Wolverhampton Council election
- 2006 Worcester Council election
- 2006 Worthing Council election
- 2006 Wyre Forest Council election

== North America ==
- 2006 Belizean municipal elections
- 2006 Costa Rican general election
- 2006 Costa Rican municipal elections
- 2006 Nicaraguan general election
- 2006 Panama Canal expansion referendum
- 2006 Salvadoran legislative election

=== Canada ===
- 2006 Canadian electoral calendar
- 2006 Canadian federal election
- 2006 Canadian federal by-elections
- 2006 Green Party of Canada leadership election
- 2006 Liberal Party of Canada leadership election
- 2006 Progressive Conservative Party of Manitoba leadership election
- 2006 Manitoba municipal elections
- 2006 New Brunswick general election
- 2006 New Democratic Party of Newfoundland and Labrador leadership election
- 2006 Nova Scotia general election
- 2006 New Democratic Party of Prince Edward Island leadership election
- 2006 Progressive Conservative Association of Alberta leadership election
- 2006 Progressive Conservative Association of Nova Scotia leadership election
- 2006 Quebec municipal elections
- 2006 Saskatchewan municipal elections
- 2006 Winnipeg municipal election
- 2006 Yukon general election

==== Ontario municipal ====
- 2006 Ontario municipal elections
- 2006 Brampton municipal election
- 2006 Brantford municipal election
- 2006 Cambridge municipal election
- 2006 Chatham-Kent municipal election
- 2006 Greater Sudbury municipal election
- 2006 Guelph municipal election
- 2006 Hamilton, Ontario municipal election
- 2006 Markham municipal election
- 2006 Mississauga municipal election
- 2006 Norfolk County municipal election
- 2006 Oakville municipal election
- 2006 Ottawa municipal election
- 2006 Peterborough County municipal elections
- 2006 Peterborough municipal election
- 2006 Richmond Hill municipal election
- 2006 St. Catharines municipal election
- 2006 Thunder Bay municipal election
- 2006 Timmins municipal election
- 2006 Toronto municipal election
- 2006 Vaughan municipal election
- 2006 Windsor municipal election

=== Caribbean ===
- 2006 Costa Rican parliamentary election
- 2006 Dominican Republic parliamentary election
- 2006 Haitian general election
- 2006 Montserratian general election
- 2006 Netherlands Antilles general election
- 2006 Saint Lucian general election
- 2006 Saint Pierre and Miquelon legislative election

=== Mexico ===
- 2006 Mexican elections
- Alliance for Mexico
- 2006 Chiapas state election
- Coalition for the Good of All
- 2006 Colima state election
- 2006 Mexican Federal District election
- 2006 Guanajuato state election
- 2006 Jalisco state election
- 2006 Mexican general election
  - Controversies of the 2006 Mexican general election
- 2006 Nuevo León state election
- Socialist Alliance (Mexico)
- 2006 Sonora state election
- 2006 State of Mexico election
- 2006 Tabasco state election

=== United States ===
- 2006 United States Senate elections
- 2006 United States elections
- 2006 United States gubernatorial elections
- Fighting Dems
- The Daily Show: Indecision 2006
- 2006 Navajo Nation presidential election
- Veterans' Alliance for Security and Democracy
- Video the Vote

==== United States gubernatorial ====
- 2006 Alabama gubernatorial election
- 2006 Alaska gubernatorial election
- 2006 Arizona gubernatorial election
- 2006 Arkansas gubernatorial election
- 2006 California gubernatorial election
- 2006 Colorado gubernatorial election
- 2006 Connecticut gubernatorial election
- 2006 Idaho gubernatorial election
- 2006 Illinois gubernatorial election
- 2006 Maine gubernatorial election
- 2006 Maryland gubernatorial election
- 2006 Michigan gubernatorial election
- 2006 New Hampshire gubernatorial election
- 2006 New Mexico gubernatorial election
- 2006 New York gubernatorial election
- 2006 Oklahoma gubernatorial election
- 2006 Oregon gubernatorial election
- 2006 Pennsylvania gubernatorial election
- 2006 South Carolina gubernatorial election
- 2006 Tennessee gubernatorial election
- 2006 United States gubernatorial elections
- 2006 Wisconsin gubernatorial election
- 2006 Wyoming gubernatorial election

==== United States lieutenant gubernatorial ====
- 2006 Alabama lieutenant gubernatorial election
- 2006 Arkansas lieutenant gubernatorial election
- 2006 California lieutenant gubernatorial election
- 2006 Georgia lieutenant gubernatorial election
- 2006 Oklahoma lieutenant gubernatorial election
- 2006 Pennsylvania lieutenant gubernatorial election
- 2006 Texas lieutenant gubernatorial election

==== United States mayoral ====
- 2006 Anaheim mayoral election
- 2006 Anchorage mayoral election
- 2006 Auburn, Alabama municipal election
- 2006 Austin mayoral election
- 2006 Burlington, Vermont mayoral election
- 2006 Fort Lauderdale mayoral election
- 2006 Irvine mayoral election
- 2006 Lexington, Kentucky mayoral election
- 2006 Long Beach, California, mayoral election
- 2006 Louisville mayoral election
- 2006 Lubbock mayoral election
- 2006 New Orleans mayoral election
- 2006 Newark mayoral election
- 2006 Oakland mayoral election
- 2006 Providence, Rhode Island mayoral election
- 2005–06 San Bernardino mayoral election
- 2006 San Jose, California, mayoral election
- 2006 Shreveport mayoral election
- 2006 Sioux Falls mayoral election
- 2006 Tallahassee mayoral election
- 2006 Tulsa mayoral election
- 2006 Washington, D.C., mayoral election

==== Alabama ====
- 2006 Alabama gubernatorial election
- United States House of Representatives elections in Alabama, 2006

==== Alaska ====
- 2006 Alaska state elections
- 2006 Alaska gubernatorial election
- United States House of Representatives election in Alaska, 2006
- Juneau, Alaska, regular election, 2006

==== American Samoa ====
- 2006 American Samoan legislative election

==== Arizona ====
- 2006 Arizona gubernatorial election
- 2006 Arizona State Legislature election
- 2006 Arizona Proposition 107
- 2006 Arizona Proposition 207
- 2006 Arizona elections
- Proposition 204
- 2006 United States Senate election in Arizona
- 2006 United States House of Representatives elections in Arizona
- 2006 Arizona's 8th congressional district election

==== Arkansas ====
- 2006 Arkansas state elections
- 2006 Arkansas gubernatorial election
- United States House of Representatives elections in Arkansas, 2006

==== California ====
- 2006 California state elections
- 2006 California Attorney General election
- 2006 California Insurance Commissioner election
- 2006 California Secretary of State election
- 2006 California State Controller election
- 2006 California State Treasurer election
- 2006 California Superintendent of Public Instruction election
- 2006 California lieutenant gubernatorial election
- 2006 California Courts of Appeal elections
- 2006 California gubernatorial election
- 2006 Richmond, California municipal elections
- 2006 San Francisco Board of Supervisors elections
- June 2006 San Francisco general elections
- November 2006 San Francisco general elections
- 2006 California State Senate elections
- 2006 California State Assembly elections

===== California congressional =====
- 2006 California's 50th congressional district special election
- United States Senate election in California, 2006

==== Colorado ====
- 2006 Colorado gubernatorial election
- 2006 United States House of Representatives elections in Colorado

==== Connecticut ====
- Connecticut for Lieberman
- 2006 Connecticut Senate election
- 2006 Connecticut gubernatorial election
- 2006 Connecticut's 4th congressional district election
- 2006 United States House of Representatives elections in Connecticut
- 2006 United States Senate election in Connecticut

==== Florida ====
- 2006 Florida state elections
- 2006 Florida gubernatorial election
- United States House of Representatives elections in Florida, 2006
- United States Senate election in Florida, 2006

==== Georgia (U.S. state) ====
- United States House of Representatives elections in Georgia, 2006
- 2006 Georgia gubernatorial election
- 2006 Georgia statewide elections
- 2006 Georgia state elections

==== Guam ====
- 2006 Guamanian general election

==== Hawaii ====
- 2006 Hawaii gubernatorial election
- United States House of Representatives elections in Hawaii, 2006
- United States Senate election in Hawaii, 2006

==== Idaho ====
- 2006 Idaho gubernatorial election
- 2006 Idaho legislative elections
- United States House of Representatives elections in Idaho, 2006

==== Illinois ====
- 2006 Illinois gubernatorial election
- 2006 Illinois state elections
- United States House of Representatives elections in Illinois, 2006

==== Iowa ====
- 2006 Iowa gubernatorial election
- 2006 Iowa House of Representatives elections
- 2006 Iowa Senate elections

==== Kansas ====
- 2006 Kansas gubernatorial election
- United States House of Representatives elections in Kansas, 2006

==== Louisiana ====
- 2006 New Orleans city council election
- 2006 New Orleans mayoral election
- 2006 United States House of Representatives elections in Louisiana

==== Maine ====
- 2006 Maine gubernatorial election
- United States House of Representatives elections in Maine, 2006
- United States Senate election in Maine, 2006

==== Maryland ====
- 2006 Maryland state elections
- 2006 Maryland Attorney General election
- 2006 Maryland Comptroller election
- 2006 Maryland General Assembly elections
- 2010 Maryland General Assembly elections
- 2006 Maryland county executive elections
- 2006 Maryland gubernatorial election
- United States House of Representatives elections in Maryland, 2006
- United States Senate election in Maryland, 2006

==== Massachusetts ====
- 2006 Massachusetts general election
- 2006 Massachusetts gubernatorial election
- 2006 Massachusetts Governor's Council elections
- 2006 Massachusetts House of Representatives elections
- 2006 Massachusetts Senate elections
- United States House of Representatives elections in Massachusetts, 2006
- United States Senate election in Massachusetts, 2006

==== Michigan ====
- 2006 Michigan gubernatorial election
- United States Senate election in Michigan, 2006

==== Minnesota ====
- 2006 Minnesota gubernatorial election
- 2006 Minnesota state auditor election
- 2006 Minnesota state elections

==== Mississippi ====
- United States House of Representatives elections in Mississippi, 2006

==== Missouri ====
- Missouri Constitutional Amendment 2 (2006)
- United States House of Representatives elections in Missouri, 2006

==== Montana ====
- United States House of Representatives election in Montana, 2006
- United States Senate election in Montana, 2006

==== Nebraska ====
- 2006 Nebraska gubernatorial election
- United States House of Representatives elections in Nebraska, 2006

==== Nevada ====
- 2006 Nevada gubernatorial election

==== New Hampshire ====
- 2006 New Hampshire gubernatorial election
- 2006 New Hampshire state elections
- 2006 New Hampshire's 1st congressional district election
- United States House of Representatives elections in New Hampshire, 2006

==== New Mexico ====
- 2006 New Mexico gubernatorial election
- United States House of Representatives elections in New Mexico, 2006
- United States Senate election in New Mexico, 2006

==== New York ====
- 2006 New York state elections
- 2006 New York Comptroller election
- 2006 New York attorney general election
- 2006 New York gubernatorial election
- 2006 New York's 13th congressional district election
- 2006 New York's 20th congressional district election
- 2006 New York's 29th congressional district election
- New York's 99th assembly district
- 2006 United States House of Representatives elections in New York
- 2006 United States Senate election in New York

==== North Carolina ====
- 2006 North Carolina judicial elections
- United States House of Representatives elections in North Carolina, 2006

==== North Dakota ====
- 2006 North Dakota state elections
- United States Senate election in North Dakota, 2006

==== Ohio ====
- 2006 Ohio gubernatorial election
- 2006 Ohio's 2nd congressional district election
- United States House of Representatives elections in Ohio, 2006
- United States Senate election in Ohio, 2006

==== Oklahoma ====
- 2006 Oklahoma gubernatorial election
- 2006 Oklahoma state elections
- 2006 Tulsa, Oklahoma mayoral election
- United States House of Representatives elections in Oklahoma, 2006

==== Oregon ====
- Oregon Ballot Measure 48 (2006)
- 2006 Oregon gubernatorial election
- 2006 Oregon primary election
- 2006 Oregon's statewide elections
- 2006 Portland, Oregon area elections
- United States House of Representatives elections in Oregon, 2006

==== Pennsylvania ====
- 2006 Pennsylvania gubernatorial election
- 2006 Pennsylvania lieutenant gubernatorial election
- 2006 Pennsylvania House of Representatives elections
- 2006 Pennsylvania Senate elections
- 2006 Pennsylvania state elections
- United States House of Representatives elections in Pennsylvania, 2006

==== Rhode Island ====
- 2006 Rhode Island gubernatorial election
- United States House of Representatives elections in Rhode Island, 2006

==== South Carolina ====
- 2006 South Carolina state elections
- 2006 South Carolina gubernatorial election

==== South Dakota ====
- 2006 South Dakota gubernatorial election
- United States House of Representatives election in South Dakota, 2006

==== Tennessee ====
- 2006 Tennessee gubernatorial election
- United States House of Representatives elections in Tennessee, 2006
- United States Senate election in Tennessee, 2006

==== Texas ====
- 2006 Texas gubernatorial election
- 2006 Texas Legislature elections
- 2006 Texas general election
- 2006 Texas's 22nd congressional district elections
- United States Senate election in Texas, 2006

==== United States House of Representatives ====
- 2006 United States House of Representatives elections
- United States House of Representatives elections, 2006 – complete list
- United States House of Representatives elections, 2006 – predictions
- United States House of Representatives elections in Alabama, 2006
- United States House of Representatives election in Alaska, 2006
- 2006 Arizona's 8th congressional district election
- United States House of Representatives elections in Arkansas, 2006
- United States House of Representatives elections in Colorado, 2006
- United States House of Representatives elections in Connecticut, 2006
- 2006 Connecticut's 4th congressional district election
- United States House of Representatives election in Delaware, 2006
- United States House of Representatives elections in Florida, 2006
- 2006 Florida's 5th congressional district election
- 2006 Florida's 8th congressional district election
- 2006 Florida's 9th congressional district election
- 2006 Florida's 16th congressional district election
- United States House of Representatives elections in Georgia, 2006
- 2006 Georgia's 4th congressional district election
- United States House of Representatives elections in Hawaii, 2006
- United States House of Representatives elections in Idaho, 2006
- United States House of Representatives elections in Illinois, 2006
- 2006 Illinois's 6th congressional district election
- 2006 Illinois's 8th congressional district election
- 2006 Illinois's 10th congressional district election
- 2006 Illinois's 11th congressional district election
- 2006 Illinois's 19th congressional district election
- United States House of Representatives elections in Indiana, 2006
- 2006 Indiana's 7th congressional district election
- United States House of Representatives elections in Iowa, 2006
- United States House of Representatives elections in Kansas, 2006
- United States House of Representatives elections in Kentucky, 2006
- United States House of Representatives elections in Louisiana, 2006
- 2006 Louisiana's 2nd congressional district election
- United States House of Representatives elections in Maine, 2006
- United States House of Representatives elections in Maryland, 2006
- United States House of Representatives elections in Massachusetts, 2006
- 2006 Minnesota's 5th congressional district election
- 2006 Minnesota's 6th congressional district election
- 2006 Minnesota's 8th congressional district election
- 2006 United States House of Representatives elections in Mississippi
- 2006 United States House of Representatives elections in Missouri
- 2006 United States House of Representatives election in Montana
- 2006 United States House of Representatives elections in Nevada
- 2006 Nevada's 2nd congressional district election
- 2006 United States House of Representatives elections in New Hampshire
- 2006 New Hampshire's 1st congressional district election
- 2006 United States House of Representatives elections in New Jersey
- 2006 New Jersey's 5th congressional district election
- 2006 New Jersey's 13th congressional district election
- United States House of Representatives elections in New Mexico, 2006
- United States House of Representatives elections in New York, 2006
- 2006 New York's 13th congressional district election
- 2006 New York's 20th congressional district election
- 2006 New York's 29th congressional district election
- United States House of Representatives elections in Ohio, 2006
- 2006 Ohio's 2nd congressional district election
- United States House of Representatives elections in Oklahoma, 2006
- United States House of Representatives elections in Oregon, 2006
- United States House of Representatives elections in Rhode Island, 2006
- United States House of Representatives elections in South Carolina, 2006
- United States House of Representatives election in South Dakota, 2006
- United States House of Representatives elections in Tennessee, 2006
- 2006 Texas's 22nd congressional district elections
- United States House of Representatives elections in Arizona, 2006
- United States House of Representatives elections in Utah, 2006
- United States House of Representatives election in Vermont, 2006
- United States House of Representatives elections in Virginia, 2006
- United States House of Representatives elections in Washington, 2006
- United States House of Representatives elections in West Virginia, 2006
- United States House of Representatives elections in Nebraska, 2006
- 2006 West Virginia's 2nd congressional district election
- 2006 Wisconsin's 8th congressional district election
- United States House of Representatives elections in Wisconsin, 2006
- United States House of Representatives election in Wyoming, 2006

==== United States Senate ====
- 2006 United States Senate elections
- United States Senate election in Arizona, 2006
- United States Senate election in California, 2006
- United States Senate election in Connecticut, 2006
- Connecticut for Lieberman
- Controversies of the United States Senate election in Virginia, 2006
- United States Senate election in Delaware, 2006
- United States Senate election in Florida, 2006
- United States Senate election in Hawaii, 2006
- United States Senate election in Indiana, 2006
- United States Senate election in Maine, 2006
- United States Senate election in Maryland, 2006
- United States Senate election in Massachusetts, 2006
- United States Senate election in Michigan, 2006
- United States Senate election in Minnesota, 2006
- United States Senate election in Mississippi, 2006
- 2006 United States Senate election in Missouri
- United States Senate election in Montana, 2006
- United States Senate election in Nebraska, 2006
- United States Senate election in Nevada, 2006
- United States Senate election in New Jersey, 2006
- United States Senate election in New Mexico, 2006
- United States Senate election in New York, 2006
- United States Senate election in North Dakota, 2006
- United States Senate election in Ohio, 2006
- United States Senate election in Pennsylvania, 2006
- United States Senate election in Rhode Island, 2006
- United States Senate election in Tennessee, 2006
- United States Senate election in Washington, 2006
- United States Senate election in Wisconsin, 2006
- United States Senate election in Utah, 2006
- United States Senate election in Virginia, 2006
- Macacawitz
- United States Senate election in West Virginia, 2006
- United States Senate election in Wyoming, 2006

==== Utah ====
- United States House of Representatives elections in Utah, 2006
- United States Senate election in Utah, 2006

==== Vermont ====
- 2006 Vermont gubernatorial election
- 2006 Vermont Auditor of Accounts election
- 2006 Vermont elections

==== Virginia ====
- Controversies of the United States Senate election in Virginia, 2006
- United States House of Representatives elections in Virginia, 2006
- United States Senate election in Virginia, 2006

==== Washington (state) ====
- 2006 Washington State House elections
- 2006 Washington State local elections
- 2006 Washington State Senate elections
- 2006 Washington State Supreme Court elections
- United States House of Representatives elections in Washington, 2006
- Northwest Progressive Institute
- United States Senate election in Washington, 2006
- Washington Initiative 920 (2006)
- Washington Initiative 933 (2006)
- Washington Initiative 937 (2006)
- Washington Resolution 4223 (2006)

==== Washington, D.C. ====
- 2006 Washington, D.C. mayoral election

==== West Virginia ====
- United States House of Representatives elections in West Virginia, 2006
- United States Senate election in West Virginia, 2006
- 2006 West Virginia's 2nd congressional district election

==== Wisconsin ====
- 2006 Wisconsin gubernatorial election
- United States House of Representatives elections in Wisconsin, 2006
- United States Senate election in Wisconsin, 2006
- 2006 Wisconsin's 8th congressional district election

==== Wyoming ====
- United States House of Representatives election in Wyoming, 2006
- United States Senate election in Wyoming, 2006
- 2006 Wyoming gubernatorial election

== Oceania ==
- 2006 Akaoa by-election
- 2006 American Samoan legislative election
- 2006 Cook Islands general election
- 2006 Fa’asalele’aga No 2 By-election
- 2006 Fijian general election
- 2006 Fijian presidential election
- 2005 Manihiki by-election
- 2006 Samoan general election
- 2006 Solomon Islands general election
- 2006 Teenui-Mapumai by-election
- 2006 Tokelauan self-determination referendum
- 2006 Tuvaluan general election

=== American Samoa ===
- 2006 American Samoan legislative election

=== Australia ===
- 2006 Australian Labor Party leadership election
- 2006 Gaven state by-election
- 2006 Queensland state election
- 2006 Results and maps of the Victorian state election
- 2006 South Australian state election
- 2006 Stuart by-election
- 2006 Tasmanian state election
- 2006 Victoria Park state by-election
- 2006 Victorian state election

=== Guam ===
- 2006 Guamanian general election

=== Hawaii ===
- 2006 Hawaii gubernatorial election
- United States House of Representatives elections in Hawaii, 2006
- United States Senate election in Hawaii, 2006

== Singapore general ==
- 2006 Singaporean general election
- 2006 Pre-election-day events of the Singaporean general election

== South America ==
- 2006 Bolivian Constituent Assembly election
- 2006 Brazilian general election
- 2005–06 Chilean presidential election
- 2006 Colombian presidential election
- 2006 Colombian legislative election
- 2006 Ecuadorian general election
- 2006 Guyanese legislative election
- 2006 Peruvian general election
- 2006 Rio Grande do Sul State Elections
- 2006 São Paulo state election
- 2006 Venezuelan presidential election

== United States ==
- 2006 United States Senate elections
- 2006 United States elections
- 2006 United States gubernatorial elections
- Fighting Dems
- The Daily Show: Indecision 2006
- 2006 Navajo Nation presidential election
- Veterans' Alliance for Security and Democracy
- Video the Vote

=== United States gubernatorial ===
- 2006 Alabama gubernatorial election
- 2006 Alaska gubernatorial election
- 2006 Arizona gubernatorial election
- 2006 Arkansas gubernatorial election
- 2006 California gubernatorial election
- 2006 Colorado gubernatorial election
- 2006 Connecticut gubernatorial election
- 2006 Idaho gubernatorial election
- 2006 Illinois gubernatorial election
- 2006 Maine gubernatorial election
- 2006 Maryland gubernatorial election
- 2006 Michigan gubernatorial election
- 2006 New Hampshire gubernatorial election
- 2006 New Mexico gubernatorial election
- 2006 New York gubernatorial election
- 2006 Oklahoma gubernatorial election
- 2006 Oregon gubernatorial election
- 2006 Pennsylvania gubernatorial election
- 2006 South Carolina gubernatorial election
- 2006 Tennessee gubernatorial election
- 2006 Wisconsin gubernatorial election
- 2006 Wyoming gubernatorial election

=== United States mayoral ===
- 2006 Anaheim mayoral election
- 2006 Anchorage mayoral election
- 2006 Austin mayoral election
- 2006 Fort Lauderdale mayoral election
- 2006 Irvine mayoral election
- 2006 Lexington, Kentucky mayoral election
- 2006 Long Beach, California mayoral election
- 2006 Louisville mayoral election
- 2006 Newark mayoral election
- 2006 New Orleans mayoral election
- 2006 Richmond, California municipal elections
- 2005–06 San Bernardino mayoral election
- 2006 San Jose mayoral election
- 2006 Norfolk mayoral election
- 2006 Oakland mayoral election
- 2006 Providence, Rhode Island mayoral election
- 2006 Santa Ana, California mayoral election
- 2006 Sioux Falls mayoral election
- 2006 Tallahassee mayoral election
- 2006 Tulsa mayoral election
- 2006 Washington, D.C., mayoral election

=== Alabama ===
- 2006 Alabama gubernatorial election
- United States House of Representatives elections in Alabama, 2006

=== Alaska ===
- 2006 Alaska state elections
- 2006 Alaska gubernatorial election
- United States House of Representatives election in Alaska, 2006
- Juneau, Alaska, regular election, 2006

=== American Samoa ===
- 2006 American Samoan legislative election

=== Arizona ===
- 2006 Arizona gubernatorial election
- 2006 Arizona Legislature elections
- Arizona Proposition 107 (2006)
- Arizona Proposition 207 (2006)
- 2006 Arizona state elections
- Proposition 204
- United States Senate election in Arizona, 2006
- United States House of Representatives elections in Arizona, 2006
- 2006 Arizona's 8th congressional district election

=== Arkansas ===
- 2006 Arkansas state elections
- 2006 Arkansas gubernatorial election
- United States House of Representatives elections in Arkansas, 2006

=== California ===
- 2006 California state elections
- 2006 California Attorney General election
- 2006 California Insurance Commissioner election
- 2006 California Secretary of State election
- 2006 California State Controller election
- 2006 California State Treasurer election
- 2006 California Superintendent of Public Instruction election
- 2006 California lieutenant gubernatorial election
- 2006 California Courts of Appeal elections
- 2006 California gubernatorial election
- 2006 Richmond, California municipal elections
- 2006 San Francisco Board of Supervisors elections
- June 2006 San Francisco general elections
- November 2006 San Francisco general elections
- 2006 California State Senate elections
- 2006 California State Assembly elections

==== California congressional ====
- 2006 California's 50th congressional district special election
- United States Senate election in California, 2006

=== Colorado ===
- 2006 Colorado gubernatorial election
- United States House of Representatives elections in Colorado, 2006

=== Connecticut ===
- Connecticut for Lieberman
- 2006 Connecticut Senate election
- 2006 Connecticut gubernatorial election
- 2006 Connecticut's 4th congressional district election
- United States House of Representatives elections in Connecticut, 2006
- United States Senate election in Connecticut, 2006

=== Florida ===
- 2006 Florida state elections
- 2006 Florida gubernatorial election
- United States House of Representatives elections in Florida, 2006
- United States Senate election in Florida, 2006

=== Georgia (U.S. state) ===
- United States House of Representatives elections in Georgia, 2006
- 2006 Georgia gubernatorial election
- 2006 Georgia statewide elections
- 2006 Georgia state elections

=== Guam ===
- 2006 Guamanian general election

=== Hawaii ===
- 2006 Hawaii gubernatorial election
- United States House of Representatives elections in Hawaii, 2006
- United States Senate election in Hawaii, 2006

=== Idaho ===
- 2006 Idaho gubernatorial election
- 2006 Idaho legislative elections
- United States House of Representatives elections in Idaho, 2006

=== Illinois ===
- 2006 Illinois gubernatorial election
- 2006 Illinois state elections
- United States House of Representatives elections in Illinois, 2006

=== Iowa ===
- 2006 Iowa gubernatorial election
- 2006 Iowa House of Representatives elections
- 2006 Iowa Senate elections

=== Kansas ===
- 2006 Kansas gubernatorial election
- United States House of Representatives elections in Kansas, 2006

=== Louisiana ===
- 2006 Louisiana's 2nd congressional district election
- 2006 New Orleans city council election
- 2006 New Orleans mayoral election
- United States House of Representatives elections in Louisiana, 2006

=== Maine ===
- 2006 Maine gubernatorial election
- United States House of Representatives elections in Maine, 2006
- United States Senate election in Maine, 2006

=== Maryland ===
- 2006 Maryland state elections
- 2006 Maryland Attorney General election
- 2006 Maryland Comptroller election
- 2006 Maryland General Assembly elections
- 2010 Maryland General Assembly elections
- 2006 Maryland county executive elections
- 2006 Maryland gubernatorial election
- United States House of Representatives elections in Maryland, 2006
- United States Senate election in Maryland, 2006

=== Massachusetts ===
- 2006 Massachusetts general election
- 2006 Massachusetts gubernatorial election
- 2006 Massachusetts Governor's Council elections
- 2006 Massachusetts House of Representatives elections
- 2006 Massachusetts Senate elections
- United States House of Representatives elections in Massachusetts, 2006
- United States Senate election in Massachusetts, 2006

=== Michigan ===
- 2006 Michigan gubernatorial election
- United States Senate election in Michigan, 2006

=== Minnesota ===
- 2006 Minnesota gubernatorial election
- 2006 Minnesota state auditor election
- 2006 Minnesota state elections

=== Mississippi ===
- United States House of Representatives elections in Mississippi, 2006

=== Missouri ===
- Missouri Constitutional Amendment 2 (2006)
- United States House of Representatives elections in Missouri, 2006

=== Montana ===
- United States House of Representatives election in Montana, 2006
- United States Senate election in Montana, 2006

=== Nebraska ===
- 2006 Nebraska gubernatorial election
- United States House of Representatives elections in Nebraska, 2006

=== Nevada ===
- 2006 Nevada gubernatorial election

=== New Hampshire ===
- 2006 New Hampshire gubernatorial election
- 2006 New Hampshire state elections
- 2006 New Hampshire's 1st congressional district election
- United States House of Representatives elections in New Hampshire, 2006

=== New Mexico ===
- 2006 New Mexico gubernatorial election
- United States House of Representatives elections in New Mexico, 2006
- United States Senate election in New Mexico, 2006

=== New York ===
- 2006 New York state elections
- 2006 New York Comptroller election
- 2006 New York attorney general election
- 2006 New York gubernatorial election
- 2006 New York's 13th congressional district election
- 2006 New York's 20th congressional district election
- 2006 New York's 29th congressional district election
- New York's 99th assembly district
- 2006 United States House of Representatives elections in New York
- 2006 United States Senate election in New York

=== North Carolina ===
- 2006 North Carolina judicial elections
- United States House of Representatives elections in North Carolina, 2006

=== North Dakota ===
- 2006 North Dakota state elections
- United States Senate election in North Dakota, 2006

=== Ohio ===
- 2006 Ohio gubernatorial election
- 2006 Ohio's 2nd congressional district election
- United States House of Representatives elections in Ohio, 2006
- United States Senate election in Ohio, 2006

=== Oklahoma ===
- 2006 Oklahoma gubernatorial election
- 2006 Oklahoma state elections
- 2006 Tulsa, Oklahoma mayoral election
- United States House of Representatives elections in Oklahoma, 2006

=== Oregon ===
- Oregon Ballot Measure 48 (2006)
- 2006 Oregon gubernatorial election
- 2006 Oregon primary election
- 2006 Oregon's statewide elections
- 2006 Portland, Oregon area elections
- United States House of Representatives elections in Oregon, 2006

=== Pennsylvania ===
- 2006 Pennsylvania gubernatorial election
- 2006 Pennsylvania lieutenant gubernatorial election
- 2006 Pennsylvania House of Representatives elections
- 2006 Pennsylvania Senate elections
- 2006 Pennsylvania state elections
- United States House of Representatives elections in Pennsylvania, 2006

=== Rhode Island ===
- 2006 Rhode Island gubernatorial election
- United States House of Representatives elections in Rhode Island, 2006

=== South Carolina ===
- 2006 South Carolina state elections
- 2006 South Carolina gubernatorial election

=== South Dakota ===
- 2006 South Dakota gubernatorial election
- United States House of Representatives election in South Dakota, 2006

=== Tennessee ===
- 2006 Tennessee gubernatorial election
- United States House of Representatives elections in Tennessee, 2006
- United States Senate election in Tennessee, 2006

=== Texas ===
- 2006 Texas gubernatorial election
- 2006 Texas Legislature elections
- 2006 Texas general election
- 2006 Texas's 22nd congressional district elections
- United States Senate election in Texas, 2006

=== United States House of Representatives ===
- 2006 United States House of Representatives elections
- United States House of Representatives elections, 2006 – complete list
- United States House of Representatives elections, 2006 – predictions
- United States House of Representatives elections in Alabama, 2006
- United States House of Representatives election in Alaska, 2006
- 2006 Arizona's 8th congressional district election
- 2006 United States House of Representatives elections in Arkansas
- 2006 United States House of Representatives elections in Colorado
- 2006 United States House of Representatives elections in Connecticut
- 2006 Connecticut's 4th congressional district election
- United States House of Representatives election in Delaware, 2006
- United States House of Representatives elections in Florida, 2006
- 2006 Florida's 5th congressional district election
- 2006 Florida's 8th congressional district election
- 2006 Florida's 9th congressional district election
- 2006 Florida's 16th congressional district election
- United States House of Representatives elections in Georgia, 2006
- 2006 Georgia's 4th congressional district election
- United States House of Representatives elections in Hawaii, 2006
- United States House of Representatives elections in Idaho, 2006
- United States House of Representatives elections in Illinois, 2006
- 2006 Illinois's 6th congressional district election
- 2006 Illinois's 8th congressional district election
- 2006 Illinois's 10th congressional district election
- 2006 Illinois's 11th congressional district election
- 2006 Illinois's 19th congressional district election
- United States House of Representatives elections in Indiana, 2006
- 2006 Indiana's 7th congressional district election
- United States House of Representatives elections in Iowa, 2006
- United States House of Representatives elections in Kansas, 2006
- United States House of Representatives elections in Kentucky, 2006
- United States House of Representatives elections in Louisiana, 2006
- 2006 Louisiana's 2nd congressional district election
- United States House of Representatives elections in Maine, 2006
- United States House of Representatives elections in Maryland, 2006
- United States House of Representatives elections in Massachusetts, 2006
- 2006 Minnesota's 5th congressional district election
- 2006 Minnesota's 6th congressional district election
- 2006 Minnesota's 8th congressional district election
- 2006 United States House of Representatives elections in Mississippi
- 2006 United States House of Representatives elections in Missouri
- 2006 United States House of Representatives election in Montana
- 2006 United States House of Representatives elections in Nevada
- 2006 Nevada's 2nd congressional district election
- United States House of Representatives elections in New Hampshire, 2006
- 2006 New Hampshire's 1st congressional district election
- United States House of Representatives elections in New Jersey, 2006
- 2006 New Jersey's 5th congressional district election
- 2006 New Jersey's 13th congressional district election
- United States House of Representatives elections in New Mexico, 2006
- United States House of Representatives elections in New York, 2006
- 2006 New York's 13th congressional district election
- 2006 New York's 20th congressional district election
- 2006 New York's 29th congressional district election
- United States House of Representatives elections in Ohio, 2006
- 2006 Ohio's 2nd congressional district election
- United States House of Representatives elections in Oklahoma, 2006
- United States House of Representatives elections in Oregon, 2006
- United States House of Representatives elections in Rhode Island, 2006
- United States House of Representatives elections in South Carolina, 2006
- United States House of Representatives election in South Dakota, 2006
- United States House of Representatives elections in Tennessee, 2006
- 2006 Texas's 22nd congressional district elections
- United States House of Representatives elections in Arizona, 2006
- United States House of Representatives elections in Utah, 2006
- United States House of Representatives election in Vermont, 2006
- United States House of Representatives elections in Virginia, 2006
- United States House of Representatives elections in Washington, 2006
- United States House of Representatives elections in West Virginia, 2006
- United States House of Representatives elections in Nebraska, 2006
- 2006 West Virginia's 2nd congressional district election
- 2006 Wisconsin's 8th congressional district election
- United States House of Representatives elections in Wisconsin, 2006
- United States House of Representatives election in Wyoming, 2006

=== United States Senate ===
- 2006 United States Senate elections
- United States Senate election in Arizona, 2006
- United States Senate election in California, 2006
- United States Senate election in Connecticut, 2006
- Connecticut for Lieberman
- Controversies of the United States Senate election in Virginia, 2006
- United States Senate election in Delaware, 2006
- United States Senate election in Florida, 2006
- United States Senate election in Hawaii, 2006
- United States Senate election in Indiana, 2006
- United States Senate election in Maine, 2006
- United States Senate election in Maryland, 2006
- United States Senate election in Massachusetts, 2006
- United States Senate election in Michigan, 2006
- United States Senate election in Minnesota, 2006
- United States Senate election in Mississippi, 2006
- 2006 United States Senate election in Missouri
- United States Senate election in Montana, 2006
- United States Senate election in Nebraska, 2006
- United States Senate election in Nevada, 2006
- United States Senate election in New Jersey, 2006
- United States Senate election in New Mexico, 2006
- United States Senate election in New York, 2006
- United States Senate election in North Dakota, 2006
- United States Senate election in Ohio, 2006
- United States Senate election in Pennsylvania, 2006
- United States Senate election in Rhode Island, 2006
- United States Senate election in Tennessee, 2006
- United States Senate election in Washington, 2006
- United States Senate election in Wisconsin, 2006
- United States Senate election in Utah, 2006
- United States Senate election in Virginia, 2006
- Macacawitz
- United States Senate election in West Virginia, 2006
- United States Senate election in Wyoming, 2006

=== Utah ===
- United States House of Representatives elections in Utah, 2006
- United States Senate election in Utah, 2006

=== Vermont ===
- 2006 Vermont gubernatorial election
- 2006 Vermont Auditor of Accounts election
- 2006 Vermont elections

=== Virginia ===
- Controversies of the United States Senate election in Virginia, 2006
- United States House of Representatives elections in Virginia, 2006
- United States Senate election in Virginia, 2006

=== Washington (U.S. state) ===
- 2006 Washington State House elections
- 2006 Washington State local elections
- 2006 Washington State Senate election
- 2006 Washington State Supreme Court election
- United States House of Representatives elections in Washington, 2006
- Northwest Progressive Institute
- United States Senate election in Washington, 2006
- Washington Initiative 920 (2006)
- Washington Initiative 933 (2006)
- Washington Initiative 937 (2006)
- Washington Resolution 4223 (2006)

=== Washington, D.C. ===
- 2006 Washington, D.C. mayoral election

=== West Virginia ===
- United States House of Representatives elections in West Virginia, 2006
- United States Senate election in West Virginia, 2006
- 2006 West Virginia's 2nd congressional district election

=== Wisconsin ===
- 2006 Wisconsin gubernatorial election
- United States House of Representatives elections in Wisconsin, 2006
- United States Senate election in Wisconsin, 2006
- 2006 Wisconsin's 8th congressional district election

=== Wyoming ===
- United States House of Representatives election in Wyoming, 2006
- United States Senate election in Wyoming, 2006
- 2006 Wyoming gubernatorial election
