= 2002 Shiga gubernatorial election =

← 1998	7 July 2002	2006 →
- Turnout: 38.67 ▼27.29
Governor before election
Yoshitsugu Kunimatsu
LDP
Elected Governor
Yoshitsugu Kunimatsu
LDP

A gubernatorial election was held on 13 March 2002 to elect the next governor of Shiga (石川県, Shiga-ken), a prefecture of Japan located in the Kansai region of Honshu island.

== Candidates ==
- Yoshitsugu Kunimatsu, 64, incumbent since 1998, former prefectural official in charge of general affairs and health and welfare matters. He was supported by the LDP, New Komeito party and the NCP, as well as the opposition DPJ and the SDP.
- Yoshihiro Tanimoto, 63, adviser to the Shiga chapter of the Zenroren, endorsed by JCP.
- Masakazu Yamanaka, 48, a former company employee.
- Kingo Takada, 47, farmer.

== Results ==
Shiga gubernatorial 2002
Party	Candidate	Votes	%	±%
LDP	Yoshitsugu Kunimatsu	285,002	73.10	
JCP	Yoshihiro Tanimoto	88,636	22.74	
	Masakazu Yamanaka	9,556	2.45	
	Kingo Takada	6,642	1.70	
Turnout		397.769	38,67	▼27.29
Registered electors		1.028.690		
LDP hold		Swing		
