= 2006 Rochdale Metropolitan Borough Council election =

2006 UK local government election

| ← 2004 | 4 May 2006 | 2007 → |

20 of the 60 seats on Rochdale Metropolitan Borough Council 31 seats needed for a majority
| | First party | Second party | Third party |
|---|---|---|---|
| Party | Liberal Democrats | Labour | Conservative |
| Seats won | 12 | 6 | 2 |
| Seats after | 30 | 20 | 10 |
| Seat change | ▲5 | ▼4 | ▼1 |
| Popular vote | 21,065 | 16,043 | 12,725 |
| Percentage | 41.6% | 31.7% | 25.1% |
| Swing | ▲3.2% | ▲1.1% | ▼3.8% |
- Map of the 2006 Rochdale council election. Liberal Democrats in yellow, Labour in red and Conservatives in blue.
Council control before election
No overall control
Council control after election
No overall control

Elections to Rochdale Council were held on 4 May 2006. One third of the council was up for election and the council stayed under no overall control. Overall turnout was 32.98%.

After the election, the composition of the council was

- Liberal Democrat 30
- Labour 20
- Conservative 10

== Election result ==
Rochdale local election result 2006
| Party | Seats | Gains | Losses | Net gain/loss | Seats % | Votes % | Votes | +/− |
|---|---|---|---|---|---|---|---|---|
| Liberal Democrats | 12 | 6 | 1 | +5 | 60.0 | 41.6 | 21,065 | +3.2% |
| Labour | 6 | 1 | 5 | -4 | 30.0 | 33.4 | 16,877 | +1.1% |
| Conservative | 2 | 1 | 2 | -1 | 10.0 | 23.5 | 11,881 | -3.8% |
| BNP | 0 | 0 | 0 | 0 | 0 | 1.3 | 660 | +0.1% |
| Green | 0 | 0 | 0 | 0 | 0 | 0.2 | 122 | New |

== Ward results ==
Balderstone & Kirkholt
| Party | Candidate | Votes | % | ±% |
|---|---|---|---|---|
| Liberal Democrats | Dale Mulgrew | 957 | 46.5 | +25.1 |
| Labour | Steven Burke | 660 | 32.1 | −14.6 |
| Conservative | Linda Butler | 439 | 21.4 | −10.5 |
| Majority | | 297 | 14.4 | |
| Turnout | | 2,056 | 28.8 | |
| Liberal Democrats gain from Labour | | Swing | | |

Bamford
| Party | Candidate | Votes | % | ±% |
|---|---|---|---|---|
| Liberal Democrats | William Hobhouse | 1,593 | 50.7 | +14.1 |
| Labour | Sylvia Diggle | 1,193 | 37.9 | +23.7 |
| Conservative | Valerie Godson | 359 | 11.4 | −38.0 |
| Majority | | 400 | 12.8 | |
| Turnout | | 3,145 | 41.4 | |
| Liberal Democrats gain from Conservative | | Swing | | |

Castleton
| Party | Candidate | Votes | % | ±% |
|---|---|---|---|---|
| Liberal Democrats | Peter Davison | 1,399 | 57.6 | −2.8 |
| Labour | Colin Thompson | 646 | 26.6 | +5.0 |
| Conservative | Ronald Crossley | 384 | 15.8 | −2.6 |
| Majority | | 753 | 31.0 | |
| Turnout | | 2,429 | 32.0 | |
| Liberal Democrats hold | | Swing | | |

Central Rochdale
| Party | Candidate | Votes | % | ±% |
|---|---|---|---|---|
| Labour | Ibrar Khan | 1,763 | 49.1 | +16.0 |
| Liberal Democrats | Shah Wazir | 1,472 | 41.0 | −13.0 |
| Conservative | Roger Howarth | 354 | 9.9 | −3.0 |
| Majority | | 291 | 8.1 | |
| Turnout | | 3,589 | 47.2 | |
| Labour gain from Liberal Democrats | | Swing | | |

East Middleton
| Party | Candidate | Votes | % | ±% |
|---|---|---|---|---|
| Labour | David Murphy | 900 | 41.2 | −7.9 |
| Liberal Democrats | Mark Brady | 845 | 38.7 | −12.2 |
| Conservative | Susan Pawson | 438 | 20.1 | +20.1 |
| Majority | | 55 | 2.5 | |
| Turnout | | 2,183 | 28.3 | |
| Labour hold | | Swing | | |

Healey
| Party | Candidate | Votes | % | ±% |
|---|---|---|---|---|
| Liberal Democrats | Alan Taylor | 1,250 | 39.0 | −15.1 |
| Conservative | Andrew Neilson | 738 | 23.0 | −7.3 |
| BNP | Donald Mooney | 660 | 20.6 | +20.6 |
| Labour | Abdul Chowdry | 434 | 13.5 | −2.1 |
| Green | Samir Chatterjee | 122 | 3.8 | +3.8 |
| Majority | | 512 | 16.0 | |
| Turnout | | 3,204 | 41.1 | |
| Liberal Democrats hold | | Swing | | |

Hopwood Hall
| Party | Candidate | Votes | % | ±% |
|---|---|---|---|---|
| Labour | Carol Wardle | 1,267 | 53.2 | +9.0 |
| Conservative | Peter Burt | 761 | 31.9 | −3.0 |
| Liberal Democrats | Malcome Heard | 355 | 14.9 | −6.0 |
| Majority | | 506 | 21.3 | |
| Turnout | | 2,383 | 29.7 | |
| Labour hold | | Swing | | |

Kingsway
| Party | Candidate | Votes | % | ±% |
|---|---|---|---|---|
| Liberal Democrats | Mark Birkett | 1,218 | 45.3 | +6.6 |
| Labour | Tom Stott | 1,158 | 43.0 | +5.9 |
| Conservative | Philip Grantham | 314 | 11.7 | −12.5 |
| Majority | | 60 | 2.3 | |
| Turnout | | 2,690 | 34.2 | |
| Liberal Democrats gain from Labour | | Swing | | |

Littleborough Lakeside
| Party | Candidate | Votes | % | ±% |
|---|---|---|---|---|
| Liberal Democrats | Pauline Maguire | 1,293 | 53.5 | +2.3 |
| Conservative | Frank Mills | 785 | 32.5 | −2.0 |
| Labour | Derek Snowden | 339 | 14.0 | −0.3 |
| Majority | | 508 | 21.0 | |
| Turnout | | 2,417 | 30.8 | |
| Liberal Democrats hold | | Swing | | |

Milkstone & Deeplish
| Party | Candidate | Votes | % | ±% |
|---|---|---|---|---|
| Liberal Democrats | Angela Coric | 1,931 | 54.0 | −10.9 |
| Labour | Imtiaz Ahmed | 1,379 | 38.6 | +8.8 |
| Conservative | Mudassar Razzaq | 266 | 7.4 | +2.1 |
| Majority | | 552 | 15.4 | |
| Turnout | | 3,576 | 47.6 | |
| Liberal Democrats hold | | Swing | | |

Milnrow & Newhey
| Party | Candidate | Votes | % | ±% |
|---|---|---|---|---|
| Liberal Democrats | Denis Whittle | 1,298 | 55.2 | +2.1 |
| Conservative | Michael Butler | 581 | 24.7 | +5.4 |
| Labour | Geoffrey Coady | 472 | 20.1 | −7.5 |
| Majority | | 717 | 30.5 | |
| Turnout | | 2,351 | 30.3 | |
| Liberal Democrats hold | | Swing | | |

Norden
| Party | Candidate | Votes | % | ±% |
|---|---|---|---|---|
| Liberal Democrats | Wera Hobhouse | 1,327 | 49.2 | +16.3 |
| Conservative | Paul Chadwick | 1,109 | 41.1 | −11.5 |
| Labour | Muhammad Malik | 263 | 9.7 | −4.4 |
| Majority | | 218 | 8.1 | |
| Turnout | | 2,699 | 36.1 | |
| Liberal Democrats gain from Conservative | | Swing | | |

North Heywood
| Party | Candidate | Votes | % | ±% |
|---|---|---|---|---|
| Liberal Democrats | Peter Rush | 1,034 | 50.0 | +19.5 |
| Labour | Nick Maher | 748 | 36.2 | −10.1 |
| Conservative | Norman Warwick | 285 | 13.8 | −9.4 |
| Majority | | 286 | 13.8 | |
| Turnout | | 2,067 | 28.2 | |
| Liberal Democrats gain from Labour | | Swing | | |

North Middleton
| Party | Candidate | Votes | % | ±% |
|---|---|---|---|---|
| Labour | Ian Robertson | 811 | 43.8 | +4.3 |
| Liberal Democrats | Neil Lever | 564 | 30.5 | −1.1 |
| Conservative | David Harris | 475 | 25.7 | −3.0 |
| Majority | | 247 | 13.3 | |
| Turnout | | 1,850 | 23.4 | |
| Labour hold | | Swing | | |

Smallbridge & Firgrove
| Party | Candidate | Votes | % | ±% |
|---|---|---|---|---|
| Liberal Democrats | Christine Akram | 817 | 40.8 | −2.5 |
| Labour | Lorraine Butterworth | 769 | 38.4 | +4.2 |
| Conservative | Keith Taylor | 417 | 20.8 | −1.7 |
| Majority | | 48 | 2.4 | |
| Turnout | | 2,003 | 26.7 | |
| Liberal Democrats gain from Labour | | Swing | | |

South Middleton
| Party | Candidate | Votes | % | ±% |
|---|---|---|---|---|
| Conservative | Michael Holly | 1,261 | 42.9 | +2.0 |
| Labour | Peter Williams | 1,242 | 42.2 | +2.2 |
| Liberal Democrats | Paul Guisbourne-Hilton | 439 | 14.9 | −4.2 |
| Majority | | 19 | 0.7 | |
| Turnout | | 2,942 | 37.6 | |
| Conservative gain from Labour | | Swing | | |

Spotland & Falinge
| Party | Candidate | Votes | % | ±% |
|---|---|---|---|---|
| Liberal Democrats | Peter Clegg | 1,713 | 63.5 | +2.4 |
| Labour | James Brown | 592 | 22.0 | +0.1 |
| Conservative | Steven Scholes | 391 | 14.5 | −2.4 |
| Majority | | 1,121 | 41.5 | |
| Turnout | | 2,696 | 33.9 | |
| Liberal Democrats hold | | Swing | | |

Wardle & West Littleborough
| Party | Candidate | Votes | % | ±% |
|---|---|---|---|---|
| Conservative | Robert Clegg | 1,652 | 68.0 | +5.4 |
| Liberal Democrats | Hilary Rodgers | 477 | 19.6 | −3.9 |
| Labour | Pauline Mann | 299 | 12.3 | −1.7 |
| Majority | | 1,175 | 48.4 | |
| Turnout | | 2,428 | 34.0 | |
| Liberal Democrats hold | | Swing | | |

West Heywood
| Party | Candidate | Votes | % | ±% |
|---|---|---|---|---|
| Labour | Alan McCarthy | 954 | 47.2 | +1.3 |
| Liberal Democrats | Doreen Brophy-Lee | 585 | 28.9 | +28.9 |
| Conservative | Kathryn Burt | 484 | 23.9 | −4.9 |
| Majority | | 369 | 18.3 | |
| Turnout | | 2,023 | 23.9 | |
| Labour hold | | Swing | | |

West Middleton
| Party | Candidate | Votes | % | ±% |
|---|---|---|---|---|
| Labour | Robin Parker | 988 | 54.2 | −0.2 |
| Liberal Democrats | Barbara Guisbourne-Hilton | 498 | 27.3 | +27.3 |
| Conservative | David Pawson | 388 | 21.3 | −2.1 |
| Majority | | 490 | 26.9 | |
| Turnout | | 1,824 | 23.7 | |
| Labour hold | | Swing | | |
