= 2006 Fukagawa mayoral election =

Fukagawa held a mayoral election on October 1, 2006. Junkichi Kawano was elected but later arrested for bid-rigging forcing a by-election in January (see 2007 Fukagawa mayoral by-election).

Mayoral election 2006: Fukagawa
Party	Candidate	Votes	%	±%
Independent	Junkichi Kawano (河野 順吉)	8,174		
JCP	Terumi Kitana (北名 照美)	5,840		
Turnout			67.44	
