= 2006 Pennsylvania lieutenant gubernatorial election =

The Pennsylvania lieutenant gubernatorial election of 2006 was held on November 7, 2006. In Pennsylvania, the Lieutenant Governor is elected on the same ticket as the Governor, so the only campaign for this office was the primary election.

== Democratic primary ==
=== Candidates ===
- Catherine Baker Knoll, incumbent Lieutenant Governor (from McKees Rocks)
- William Hall III, construction contractor (from Bangor)
- Valerie McDonald-Roberts, Allegheny County Recorder of Deeds (from Pittsburgh)
- Gene Stilp, director of a pro-transparency organization (from Harrisburg)

=== Results ===
Democratic primary results
Party	Candidate	Votes	%
Democratic	Catherine Baker Knoll (incumbent)	445,873	61.4
Democratic	Valerie McDonald-Roberts	141,919	19.6
Democratic	William Hall	89,171	12.3
Democratic	Gene Stilp	47,937	6.7

Catherine Baker Knoll was renominated for her position as Lieutenant Governor, winning by a considerable margin. Although Knoll had broad support from the party establishment, she drew criticism from both liberal and conservative factions. Knoll was also viewed as a potential liability for the Rendell campaign both because of her age and owing to a series of gaffes. Knoll fights talk of Rendell dumping her in '06 Valerie McDonald-Roberts garnered the endorsements of the state's major newspapers and various left-leaning groups, but was unable to match Knoll in fundraising. William Hall vocally endorsed a socially conservative platform and performed well in heavily rural counties.

== Republican primary ==
Jim Matthews, a Montgomery County Commissioner, was unopposed for the nomination for Lieutenant Governor and thus served alongside Lynn Swann on the Republican ticket. Matthews is the brother of Chris Matthews, the MSNBC personality.

== See also ==
- Pennsylvania gubernatorial election, 2006
- Pennsylvania United States Senate election, 2006
