= 2006 Pennsylvania elections =

- November 7, 2006

Elections were held in Pennsylvania on November 7, 2006. Necessary primary elections were held on May 16, 2006.

== Governor ==
Pennsylvania gubernatorial election, 2006
Party	Candidate	Votes	%
Republican	Lynn Swann Running mate:Jim Matthews	1,622,135	39.6
Democratic	Ed Rendell Running mate:Catherine Baker Knoll	2,470,517	60.4

== Lt. Governor ==
Pennsylvania Lt. Governor primary election, 2006
Party	Candidate	Votes	%
Democratic	William A. Hall, III	89,171	12.3
Democratic	Catherine Baker Knoll	445,873	61.4
Democratic	Valerie McDonald Roberts	141,919	19.6
Democratic	Gene Stilp	48,937	6.7
Republican	Jim Matthews	553,631	100.0

== Senate ==
United States Senate primary election in Pennsylvania, 2006
Party	Candidate	Votes	%
Democratic	Bob Casey, Jr.	629,271	84.6
Democratic	Chuck Pennacchio	66,364	8.9
Democratic	Alan Sandals	48,113	6.5

United States Senate election in Pennsylvania, 2006
Party	Candidate	Votes	%
Republican	Rick Santorum	1,684,778	41.3
Democratic	Bob Casey, Jr.	2,392,984	58.7
Democratic gain from Republican			

== Ballot Question ==
Referendum results by county Yes: 70–80%; 60–70%; 50–60%; No: 50–60%

Persian Gulf Conflict Veteran's Compensation Fund Referendum
Candidate	Votes	%
Yes	2,074,692	61.2
No	1,317,051	38.8
