= 2006 Saint Pierre and Miquelon legislative election =

Legislative elections for the Territorial Council were held in Saint Pierre and Miquelon in March 2006.

== Results ==
Party	Votes	%	Seats	+/–
Archipelago Tomorrow	2,049	66.27	16	+14
Road to the Future	939	30.37	2	0
Saint Pierre and Miquelon Together	104	3.36	1	New
Total	3,092	100.00	19	0
Valid votes	3,092	89.31		
Invalid/blank votes	370	10.69		
Total votes	3,462	100.00		
Registered voters/turnout	4,865	71.16		
Source: Official Journal
