= 2006 Arizona Proposition 204 =

Ballot measure regarding farm animals

Arizona Proposition 204 (2006)
- Humane Treatment of Farm Animals

Results
Choice	Votes	%
Yes	926,913	61.96%
No	569,190	38.04%
County results
Yes
60–70%
50–60%
No
60–70%
50–60%

Proposition 204 of 2006, or the Humane Treatment of Farm Animals Act, was a law enacted by the voters of Arizona by means of the initiative process. It requires that pigs and calves used for veal on factory farms be given enough room to turn around and fully extend their limbs. The Act was approved in a vote held as part of the 2006 Arizona state elections, held on November 7. It passed with over 62% support.

== Provisions ==
The Act amended the Arizona Revised Statutes by adding a new provision, Section 13-2910.07 of the Criminal Code. This states that:

A. Notwithstanding any other provision of title 3 [which covers agriculture] or title 13 [the Criminal Code], a person shall not tether or confine any pig during pregnancy or any calf raised for veal, on a farm, for all or the majority of any day, in a manner that prevents such animal from:

1. Lying down and fully extending his or her limbs; or
2.Turning around freely.

B. This section shall not apply to:

1. Pigs or calves during transportation.
2. Pigs or calves in rodeo exhibitions, state or county fair exhibitions, or other similar exhibitions.
3. The killing of pigs or calves according to the provisions of chapter 13, title 3 and other applicable law and regulations.
4. Pigs or calves involved in lawful scientific or agricultural research.
5. Pigs or calves while undergoing an examination, test, treatment or operation for veterinary purposes.
6. A pig during the seven-day period prior to the pig's expected date of giving birth.

C. A person who violates this section is guilty of a class 1 misdemeanor.

D. [Some definitions of terms follow]

== Campaign ==
Proposition 204 was sponsored by Arizonans for Humane Farms, a coalition of animal welfare organizations, including the Arizona Humane Society, the Humane Society of the United States, the Farm Sanctuary, and the Animal Defense League of Arizona. It was opposed by the Campaign for Arizona Farmers and Ranchers with funding from agribusiness proponents such as the American Veal Association, the National Pork Producers Council, the AZ Cattle Feeders Association, AZ Pork Council, American Farm Bureau Federation, AZ Farm Bureau Federation, AZ Cattleman's Association, and the United Dairymen of Arizona.

The chairperson of the Yes on Proposition 204 campaign was Cheryl Naumann, president and CEO of the Arizona Humane Society. Another spokesperson was Maricopa County Sheriff Joe Arpaio, and the campaign was also endorsed by the radio celebrity Paul Harvey. More than 200,000 Arizonans signed petitions to place the measure on the ballot. More than 100 Arizona veterinarians endorsed Proposition 204. It was also endorsed by the Arizona Republic the Arizona Daily Star, the East Valley Tribune the Scottsdale Tribune, the Northwest Explorer, and the Tucson Weekly.

The opposition to Proposition 204 argued that the primary organizers of the initiative were anti-meat groups, and that a similar measure passed in 2002 in Florida had led to the bankruptcy of a farm in that state. However, the Florida Farm Bureau explicitly denied the claim that any farms went out of business as a result of the 2002 ballot measure in that state. In an article published the week after the 2002 election, a spokesman for the Bureau stated that "It's because of low prices, not the amendment". However, in an article the following month in the St. Petersburg Times, one of the two Florida hog farmers covered under Proposition 204 stated that he had slaughtered all of his sows because of the expense of complying with it.
