= 2006 Faʻasaleleʻaga No 2 by-election =

A Samoan by-election was held in the Faʻasaleleʻaga No. 2 constituency on 24 September 2006. The by-election was precipitated by the election of Paʻu Sefo Paʻu being declared invalid. It was contested by six candidates, and won by Paʻu's daughter, Rita Paʻu Letoa.

== Candidates ==
- Rita Paʻu Letoa (Human Rights Protection Party)
- Namulauʻulu Vavae Tuilagi
- Papaliʻi Samuelu Petaia
- Namulauʻulu Netina
