= 2006 Shinjuku mayoral election =

Shinjuku held a mayoral election on November 12, 2006. Hiroko Nakayama, backed by the LDP and New Komeito Party was re-elected. Polling turnout was extremely low, only 26% but still about 1% more than last election.

Mayoral election 2006: Shinagawa City
| Party | Candidate | Votes | % | ±% |
|---|---|---|---|---|
| LDP, NKP | Hiroko Nakayama (中山 弘子) | 44,472 | | |
| JCP | Kazu Sueyoshi (末 吉和) | 12,372 | | |
| Independent | Haruji Ishioka (石岡 春二) | 5,168 | | |
| Turnout | | 63,079 | 26.58 | 1.43 |

== Sources ==
- (in Japanese) Official results
- (in Japanese) ザ･選挙 -選挙情報-
