= 2006 Wakayama gubernatorial election =

Wakayama Prefecture held a gubernatorial election on December 17, 2006.

Gubernatorial election 2006: Wakayama
Party	Candidate	Votes	%	±%
LDP, Komeito	Yoshinobu Nisaka	195,713		
JCP	Toshitaka Izumi	90,665		
Turnout			35.21%	

== Sources ==
- Japan Election coverage (in Japanese)
