= 2006 South Tyneside Metropolitan Borough Council election =

2006 UK local government election

Results of the 2006 South Tyneside Council election

The 2006 South Tyneside Metropolitan Borough Council election took place on 4 May 2006 to elect members of South Tyneside Metropolitan Borough Council in Tyne and Wear, England. One third of the council was up for election and the Labour Party stayed in overall control of the council.

After the election, the composition of the council was:

- Labour 34
- Independent 7
- Progressive 6
- Liberal Democrat 4
- Conservative 3

== Campaign ==
Before the election Labour controlled the council with 36 seats, with 6 Progressives, 5 independents, 4 Liberal Democrats and 3 Conservatives taking the remaining seats. 18 seats were contested in the election with Labour having a full 18 candidates, independents 19, Conservatives 17, Liberal Democrats 12, Progressives 3, Greens and British National Party 2 each and 1 from the United Kingdom Independence Party. The big majority for Labour meant that there was little chance of them losing control of the council in the election.

The election saw early voting stations set up so that for the first time voters were able to vote in the normal way for up to 2 weeks before election day. However turnout on election day was significantly down at 35.9%, compared to 41.41% at the last election in 2004.

== Election result ==
The results saw Labour hold on to control of the council with a slightly smaller majority after holding all but 2 of the seats they were defending. The 2 defeats for Labour came in Fellgate and Hedworth and Westoe wards where 2 independent candidates were successful.

South Tyneside local election result 2006
Party	Seats	Gains	Losses	Net gain/loss	Seats %	Votes %	Votes	+/−
Labour	11	0	2	-2	61.1	40.5	16,458	-5.0%
Independent	3	2	0	+2	16.7	25.9	10,521	+14.7%
Progressive	2	0	0	0	11.1	6.0	2,454	-4.9%
Conservative	1	0	0	0	5.6	13.8	5,629	-0.7%
Liberal Democrats	1	0	0	0	5.6	11.6	4,724	-5.0%
BNP	0	0	0	0	0	1.2	483	+0.4%
Green	0	0	0	0	0	0.6	253	+0.3%
UKIP	0	0	0	0	0	0.4	144	+0.4%

== Ward results ==
Beacon & Bents
Party	Candidate	Votes	%	±%
Labour	John Anglin	1,008	42.7	
Liberal Democrats	Jennifer Burke	319	13.5	
BNP	James Hills	315	13.3	
Conservative	Edward Russell	262	11.1	
UKIP	Christopher Pearce	144	6.1	
Green	Bryan Atkinson	139	5.9	
Independent	Mark Crozier	136	5.8	
Independent	Ross Robertson	39	1.7	
Majority		689	29.2	
Turnout		2,362	34.8	−6.9
Labour hold		Swing		

Bede
Party	Candidate	Votes	%	±%
Independent	Thomas Defty	1,012	47.5	
Labour	Linda Waggott	909	42.7	
Liberal Democrats	Muriel Coe	208	9.8	
Majority		103	4.8	
Turnout		2,129	35.6	−3.3
Independent hold		Swing		

Biddick & All Saints
Party	Candidate	Votes	%	±%
Labour	Olive Punchion	877	45.7	
Independent	Stephen Pattison	471	24.6	
Liberal Democrats	David Selby	302	15.7	
BNP	Charles Schmidt	168	8.8	
Conservative	Hayley Anderson	100	5.2	
Majority		406	21.1	
Turnout		1,918	30.2	−2.4
Labour hold		Swing		

Boldon Colliery
Party	Candidate	Votes	%	±%
Labour	Alison Strike	1,214	46.1	
Independent	Greenwell Jewitt	647	24.6	
Liberal Democrats	Frederick Taylor	380	14.4	
Conservative	Gerald Brebner	275	10.4	
Independent	Paul Walker	116	4.4	
Majority		567	21.5	
Turnout		2,632	37.1	−3.8
Labour hold		Swing		

Cleadon & East Boldon
Party	Candidate	Votes	%	±%
Conservative	David Potts	1,330	41.1	
Liberal Democrats	James Selby	700	21.6	
Labour	Lewis Atkinson	660	20.4	
Independent	Alan Mordain	546	16.9	
Majority		630	19.5	
Turnout		3,236	46.9	−4.7
Conservative hold		Swing		

Cleadon Park
Party	Candidate	Votes	%	±%
Labour	James Foreman	690	39.9	
Independent	Arthur Morton	384	22.2	
Independent	Colin Campbell	382	22.1	
Conservative	Brian Searcey	273	15.8	
Majority		306	17.7	
Turnout		1,729	33.6	−3.6
Labour hold		Swing		

Fellgate & Hedworth
Party	Candidate	Votes	%	±%
Independent	Steven Harrison	1,162	52.8	
Labour	Edith Battye	852	38.7	
Conservative	John Fettis	187	8.5	
Majority		310	14.1	
Turnout		2,201	36.2	+0.4
Independent gain from Labour		Swing		

Harton
Party	Candidate	Votes	%	±%
Progressive	Lawrence Nolan	1,128	43.8	
Labour	Rober Dix	1,110	43.1	
Conservative	Robert Shield	335	13.0	
Majority		18	0.7	
Turnout		2,573	38.4	−6.0

Hebburn North
Party	Candidate	Votes	%	±%
Liberal Democrats	Joseph Atkinson	870	48.7	
Labour	Peter McGinley	776	43.4	
Conservative	Kevin Richardson	140	7.8	
Majority		94	5.3	
Turnout		1,786	29.9	−9.0
Liberal Democrats hold		Swing		

Hebburn South
Party	Candidate	Votes	%	±%
Labour	Nancy Maxwell	1,198	48.8	
Independent	Malcolm Hardy	685	27.9	
Liberal Democrats	Constance Ridgway	425	17.3	
Conservative	John Coe	146	5.9	
Majority		513	20.9	
Turnout		2,454	39.7	−8.4
Labour hold		Swing		

Horsley Hill
Party	Candidate	Votes	%	±%
Labour	Eileen Leask	992	39.6	
Independent	Mervin Owen	844	33.7	
Conservative	Patricia Pigott	595	23.8	
Independent	Michael Lawson	72	2.9	
Majority		148	5.9	
Turnout		2,503	39.5	−7.7
Labour hold		Swing		

Monkton
Party	Candidate	Votes	%	±%
Labour	James Sewell	950	43.2	
Independent	John Hodgson	536	24.4	
Liberal Democrats	Susan Troupe	460	20.9	
Conservative	John Cameron	252	11.5	
Majority		414	18.8	
Turnout		2,198	34.6	−4.9
Labour hold		Swing		

Primrose
Party	Candidate	Votes	%	±%
Labour	Emma Lewell	917	50.4	
Liberal Democrats	James Murray	260	14.3	
Conservative	Walter Armstrong	180	9.9	
Independent	Michael Addison	178	9.8	
Independent	Gunther Keller	142	7.8	
Green	Christopher Haine	114	6.3	
Majority		657	36.1	
Turnout		1,819	29.8	−4.2
Labour hold		Swing		

Simonside & Rekendyke
Party	Candidate	Votes	%	±%
Labour	Joan Meeks	1,036	51.0	
Progressive	Anthony Davey	494	24.3	
Liberal Democrats	Gary Ahmed	335	16.5	
Conservative	Anthony Dailly	168	8.3	
Majority		542	26.7	
Turnout		2,033	31.1	−3.5
Labour hold		Swing		

West Park
Party	Candidate	Votes	%	±%
Progressive	Kenneth Hickman	832	43.9	
Labour	Wilhelmena Moad	565	29.8	
Liberal Democrats	Carole Troupe	307	16.2	
Conservative	Martin Anderson	192	10.1	
Majority		267	14.1	
Turnout		1,896	31.7	−8.4

Westoe
Party	Candidate	Votes	%	±%
Independent	Victor Thompson	1,490	55.9	
Labour	Kenneth Stephenson	618	23.2	
Conservative	George Wilkinson	401	15.0	
Liberal Democrats	Nader Afshari-Naderi	158	5.9	
Majority		872	32.7	
Turnout		2,667	40.4	−7.4
Independent gain from Labour		Swing		

Whitburn & Marsden
Party	Candidate	Votes	%	±%
Labour	Peter Boyack	894	39.0	
Independent	Albert Norman	787	34.4	
Conservative	Jeffrey Milburn	609	26.6	
Majority		107	4.6	
Turnout		2,290	39.2	−6.3
Labour hold		Swing		

Whiteleas
Party	Candidate	Votes	%	±%
Labour	William Brady	1,192	52.6	
Independent	Robin Coombes	892	39.3	
Conservative	Christopher Taylor	184	8.1	
Majority		300	13.3	
Turnout		2,268	35.0	−9.5
Labour hold		Swing		
