= 2006 Shinagawa mayoral election =

Shinagawa in Tokyo, Japan held a mayoral election on Sunday October 8, 2006.

Mayoral election 2006: Shinagawa City
Party	Candidate	Votes	%	±%
Independent, (LDP, DPJ, NKP)	Takeshi Hamano (浜野 健)	35,422		
Independent	Shō Naitō (内藤 尚)	31,778		
Independent (JCP)	Keiko Sakurai (桜井 恵子)	20,088		
Independent	Kanji Satō (佐藤 完二)	5,877		
Independent	Tan Kanao (金尾 丹)	1,914		
Turnout		97,350	33.92	−9.24

== Sources ==
- (in Japanese) Japan-Election.net coverage
- (in Japanese) Shinagawa official result page
- (in Japanese) ザ・選挙 -選挙情報-
