= 2006 Stratford-on-Avon District Council election =

Council election for Stratford-on-Avon District in Warwickshire, England

Results of the 2006 Stratford-on-Avon District Council election

The 2006 Stratford-on-Avon District Council election took place on 4 May 2006 to elect members of Stratford-on-Avon District Council in Warwickshire, England. One third of the council was up for election and the Conservative Party stayed in overall control of the council.

After the election, the composition of the council was:

- Conservative 30
- Liberal Democrat 20
- Independent 3

== Campaign ==
19 seats were due to be contested in the election but in Wellesbourne, independent Roger Wright did not face any opposition meaning that only 18 seats saw contests take place. Both the Conservatives, who were defending 11 seats, and the Liberal Democrats, who were defending 7, were hoping to make gains in the election, while the Labour Party only put up 4 candidates in the election.

The Conservatives campaigned on pledges to take action over traffic congestion and to keep council tax levels low. However the Liberal Democrats said that big improvements in services were needed and that improving basic services should be put before any ambitious plans for the area.

== Election result ==
The results saw no seats change hands with the Conservatives remaining in control of the council as a result. Overall turnout in the election was 41.5%.

Stratford-on-Avon local election result 2006
Party	Seats	Gains	Losses	Net gain/loss	Seats %	Votes %	Votes	+/−
Conservative	11	0	0	0	57.9	52.5	12,906	+2.6
Liberal Democrats	7	0	0	0	36.8	39.6	9,738	+0.4
Independent	1	0	0	0	5.3	4.0	985	-2.2
Labour	0	0	0	0	0.0	3.3	817	-1.4
UKIP	0	0	0	0	0.0	0.5	121	+0.5

== Ward results ==
Alcester
Party	Candidate	Votes	%	±%
Liberal Democrats	Susan Juned	1,033	56.7	−0.9
Conservative	Paul Martin	566	31.1	−5.3
UKIP	Ronald Mole	121	6.6	+6.6
Labour	John Ritchie	102	5.6	−0.4
Majority		467	25.6	+4.3
Turnout		1,822	39.2	−0.6
Liberal Democrats hold		Swing		

Bidford and Salford
Party	Candidate	Votes	%	±%
Liberal Democrats	Daren Pemberton	935	55.2	+55.2
Conservative	John Brain	758	44.8	+44.8
Majority		177	10.4	
Turnout		1,693	32.8	−3.2
Liberal Democrats hold		Swing		

Brailes
Party	Candidate	Votes	%	±%
Conservative	Philip Seccombe	544	55.1	−17.9
Liberal Democrats	Richard Cheney	444	44.9	+17.9
Majority		100	10.1	−35.9
Turnout		988	58.0	+12.0
Conservative hold		Swing		

Harbury
Party	Candidate	Votes	%	±%
Liberal Democrats	Andrew Patrick	936	58.0	+10.4
Conservative	Martyn Allan	677	42.0	−10.4
Majority		259	16.0	
Turnout		1,613	43.2	−0.2
Liberal Democrats hold		Swing		

Henley
Party	Candidate	Votes	%	±%
Conservative	Laurence Marshall	1,149	76.1	+5.8
Liberal Democrats	Catherine Rolfe	360	23.9	−5.8
Majority		789	52.3	+11.7
Turnout		1,509	42.8	−0.6
Conservative hold		Swing		

Kinwarton
Party	Candidate	Votes	%	±%
Liberal Democrats	Lynn Bowring	392	53.3	−3.7
Conservative	Susan Adams	344	46.7	+3.7
Majority		48	6.5	−7.5
Turnout		736	45.8	
Liberal Democrats hold		Swing		

Long Compton
Party	Candidate	Votes	%	±%
Conservative	Stephen Gray	579	72.3	−1.6
Liberal Democrats	Philip Vial	222	27.7	+1.6
Majority		357	44.6	−3.2
Turnout		801	47.4	
Conservative hold		Swing		

Long Itchington
Party	Candidate	Votes	%	±%
Conservative	Robert Stevens	546	70.5	−1.8
Liberal Democrats	Alan Hill	114	14.7	+14.7
Labour	Carol Pratt	114	14.7	−13.0
Majority		432	55.8	+11.2
Turnout		774	43.5	
Conservative hold		Swing		

Quinton
Party	Candidate	Votes	%	±%
Conservative	Michael Brain	680	73.4	+21.1
Independent	Reginald Clarke	246	26.6	+26.6
Majority		434	46.9	+42.3
Turnout		926	46.6	
Conservative hold		Swing		

Sambourne
Party	Candidate	Votes	%	±%
Conservative	Leslie Topham	478	73.8	+3.6
Liberal Democrats	Karyl Rees	170	26.2	−3.6
Majority		308	47.5	+7.1
Turnout		648	45.4	
Conservative hold		Swing		

Snitterfield
Party	Candidate	Votes	%	±%
Conservative	Richard Hobbs	686	78.4	+0.5
Liberal Democrats	Jeanne Lowe	189	21.6	−0.5
Majority		497	56.8	+1.0
Turnout		875	46.3	
Conservative hold		Swing		

Southam
Party	Candidate	Votes	%	±%
Conservative	Alan Akeister	816	48.4	+1.1
Labour	James Taylor	471	28.0	−10.7
Liberal Democrats	Richard Waller	398	23.6	+9.6
Majority		345	20.5	+11.8
Turnout		1,685	34.1	+0.9
Conservative hold		Swing		

Stratford Alveston
Party	Candidate	Votes	%	±%
Conservative	Stuart Beese	1,167	52.0	−4.7
Liberal Democrats	Michael Crutchley	1,077	48.0	+4.7
Majority		90	4.0	−9.5
Turnout		2,244	46.0	−3.1
Conservative hold		Swing		

Stratford Avenue and New Town
Party	Candidate	Votes	%	±%
Liberal Democrats	Maureen Beckett	856	40.9	+2.8
Conservative	Laura Main	604	28.8	−23.5
Independent	William Lowe	504	24.1	+24.1
Labour	Karen Parnell	130	6.2	−3.4
Majority		252	12.1	
Turnout		2,094	40.8	+4.4
Liberal Democrats hold		Swing		

Stratford Guild and Hathaway
Party	Candidate	Votes	%	±%
Liberal Democrats	Jennifer Fradgley	1,156	52.3	+10.5
Conservative	Roy Donnelly	818	37.0	−12.9
Independent	Harry Cottam	235	10.6	+10.6
Majority		338	15.3	
Turnout		2,209	39.4	−3.8
Liberal Democrats hold		Swing		

Studley
Party	Candidate	Votes	%	±%
Liberal Democrats	Hazel Wright	1,033	58.2	+7.7
Conservative	William McCarthy	742	41.8	+0.2
Majority		291	16.4	+7.6
Turnout		1,775	39.1	−3.1
Liberal Democrats hold		Swing		

Tanworth
Party	Candidate	Votes	%	±%
Conservative	Anthony Dixon	1,033	80.9	−0.8
Liberal Democrats	Roger Sutton	244	19.1	+0.8
Majority		789	61.8	−1.5
Turnout		1,277	41.2	−0.7
Conservative hold		Swing		

Vale of the Red Horse
Party	Candidate	Votes	%	±%
Conservative	Gillian Roache	719	80.1	+7.4
Liberal Democrats	Trevor Honeychurch	179	19.9	−7.4
Majority		540	60.1	+14.7
Turnout		898	49.6	
Conservative hold		Swing		

Wellesbourne
Party	Candidate	Votes	%	±%
Independent	Roger Wright	unopposed		
Independent hold		Swing		
