= 2006 Richmond Hill municipal election =

The Town of Richmond Hill 2006 Municipal Elections were held on November 13, 2006. One mayor, two Regional & Local Councillors and six local Councillors were elected to represent residents of the town of Richmond Hill, Ontario, Canada. Additionally, school trustees were elected to the York Region District School Board, York Catholic District School Board, Conseil scolaire de district du Centre-Sud-Ouest and Conseil scolaire de district catholique Centre-Sud.

These elections were held in conjunction with all other municipalities across Ontario (see 2006 Ontario municipal elections).

== Potential issues ==
- development and urban sprawl
- protection of the Oak Ridges Moraine
- waste management

== Changes to ward boundaries ==
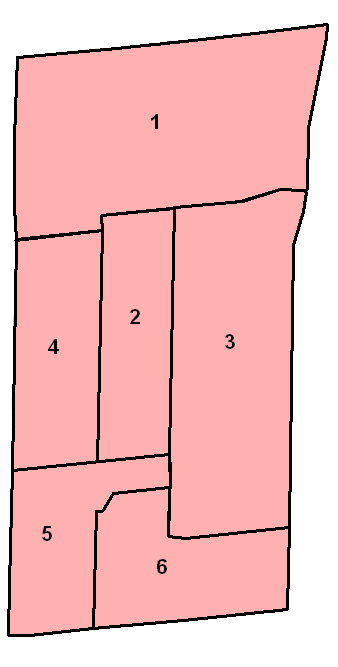
Map of Richmond Hill's Wards

The boundaries for all six Richmond Hill wards changed on December 1, 2006. Although the boundary changes did not officially take place until shortly after the election, voters cast their ballots for Local Councillor based upon the following new boundaries:

- Richmond Hill - All Wards
- Richmond Hill - Ward 1
- Richmond Hill - Ward 2
- Richmond Hill - Ward 3
- Richmond Hill - Ward 4
- Richmond Hill - Ward 5
- Richmond Hill - Ward 6

== Candidates ==
=== Mayor ===
Candidate	Votes	%
Dave Barrow	22007	78.86
David McCann	2261	9.54
Anastasios Baxevanidis	2276	8.16
Ramon Datol	962	3.45

=== Local Council ===
==== Ward 1 ====
Candidate	Votes	%
Greg Beros	1568	38.34
Carrie Hoffelner	1209	29.56
Don Ciccone	746	18.24
Heather Sinclair	328	8.02
Donna Perrette	161	3.94
Adam Dodwell	78	1.91

==== Ward 2 ====
Candidate	Votes	%
Arnie Warner (incumbent)	2128	44.54
Asghar Naqvi	1138	23.82
Carmine Perrelli	1095	22.92
Mike McCallum	354	7.41
D.L. Meitz	63	1.32

==== Ward 3 ====
Candidate	Votes	%
David L. Cohen (incumbent)	2179	61.76
Natalie Helferty	685	19.42
Vik Gandhi	436	12.36
Arif Khan	228	6.46

==== Ward 4 ====
Candidate	Votes	%
Lynn Foster (incumbent)	4046	86.94
Shiraz Hudda	608	13.06

==== Ward 5 ====
Candidate	Votes	%
Nick Papa	2509	37.72
Elio Di Iorio (incumbent)	2480	37.28
Marg Aldridge	609	9.16
Michael McGouran	552	8.30
Nancy Storey	502	7.55

==== Ward 6 ====
Candidate	Votes	%
Godwin Chan	1627	33.17
Michael Latour	1292	26.34
Sandra Di Iorio	1069	21.79
Derek Wu	614	12.52
Muhammad Ali	303	6.18

=== School Boards ===
==== York Region District School Board - Wards 1, 4 and 6 ====
Candidate	Votes	%
Diane Giangrande (incumbent)	5625	59.73
Carol Chan	3792	40.27

==== York Region District School Board - Wards 2, 3 and 5 ====
Candidate	Votes	%
Carrie L. Sheppard	4753	48.15
Peter Luchowski	2214	22.43
Renu Duggal	1465	14.84
Shabbir Mohamed	1439	14.58

Note: On July 3, 2007 Trustee Carrie Sheppard submitted her resignation, on July 10, 2007 the position was awarded to the runner-up candidate Peter Luchowski

==== York Catholic District School Board ====
Candidate (2 Elected)	Votes	%
Ann Stong (incumbent)	4300	43.41
Mike Rizzi (incumbent)	3749	37.85
Jonathan J. Chan	1857	18.75

==== Conseil scolaire de district du Centre-Sud-Ouest ====
Candidate	Votes	%
René Laurin (incumbent)	91	64.08
Paula Varvaro	51	35.92

==== Conseil scolaire de district catholique Centre-Sud ====
Candidate	Votes	%
Yves Levesque	acclaimed	
