= 2006 Ishikawa gubernatorial election =

Japanese gubernatorial election

Ishikawa Prefecture held a gubernatorial election on March 19, 2006. Incumbent Masanori Tanimoto won his fourth term. Tanimoto was backed by the Liberal Democratic Party, New Komeito Party, and the Social Democratic Party.

Gubernatorial election 2006: Ishikawa
Party	Candidate	Votes	%	±%
LDP, NKP, SDP	Masanori Tanimoto *	304,763		
JCP	Yoshinobu Kimura	64,019		
