= 2006 Shreveport mayoral election =

- September 30, 2006 (first round); November 7, 2006 (runoff)
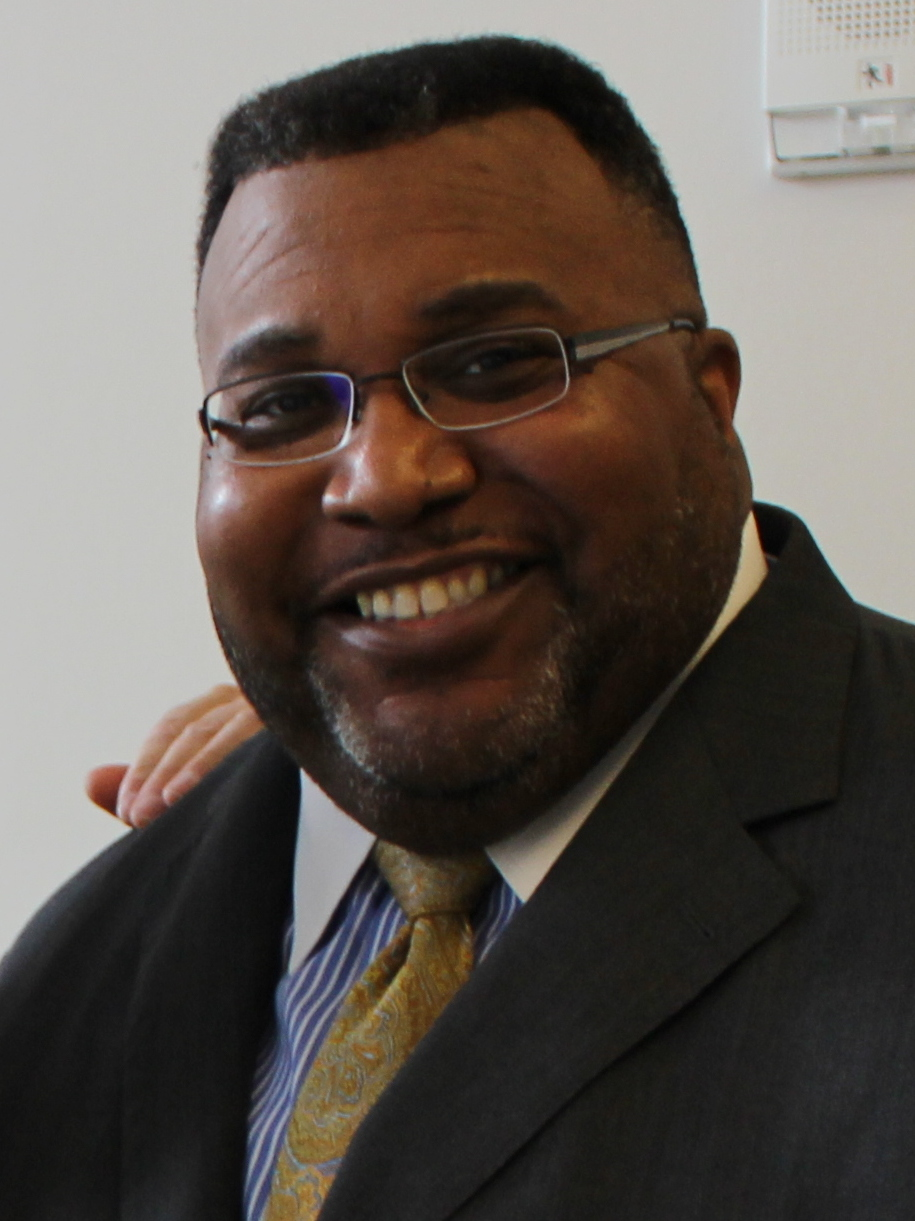

Candidate	Cedric Glover	Jerry Jones	Liz Swaine
Party	Democratic	Republican	Democratic
First round	16,335; 32.37%	19,797; 39.23%	6,612; 13.1%
Runoff	35,301; 53.5%	30,678; 46.5%	Eliminated
Candidate	Ed Bradley	Arlena Acree
Party	Democratic	Republican
First round	4,047; 8.02%	2,542; 5.04%
Runoff	Eliminated	Eliminated
Mayor before election
Keith Hightower
Democratic
Elected mayor
Cedric Glover
Democratic

The 2006 Shreveport mayoral election resulted in the election of Democrat Cedric Glover who defeated Republican Jerry Jones in the runoff in the open race to succeed outgoing mayor Keith Hightower. The nonpartisan blanket primary was held on September 30, 2006, and as no candidate obtained the required majority, the general election followed on November 7, 2006.

== Results ==
2006 Mayor of Shreveport primary election
Party	Candidate	Votes	%
Republican	Jerry Jones	19,797	39.23%
Democratic	Cedric Glover	16,335	32.37%
Democratic	Liz Swaine	6,612	13.1%
Democratic	Ed Bradley	4,047	8.02%
Republican	Arlena Acree	2,542	5.04%
Republican	Max Tatum Malone	603	1.19%
Republican	Vernon Adams	300	0.59%
Republican	Tim Goeders	114	0.23%
Independent	Madjun Ali	52	0.1%
Independent	Henry Hodge-Bey	33	0.07%
Independent	Wilson Quinby Mcmullan	27	0.05%
Total votes		50,462	100%

2006 Mayor of Shreveport general election
Party	Candidate	Votes	%
Democratic	Cedric Glover	35,301	53.5%
Republican	Jerry Jones	30,678	46.5%
Total votes		65,979	100%
