= 2006 Tallahassee mayoral election =

- September 5, 2006
- Turnout: 35.6%
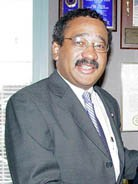

Nominee	John Marks	Kim O'Connor	Larry Hendricks
Party	Nonpartisan	Nonpartisan	Nonpartisan
Popular vote	22,894	4,099	2,516
Percentage	77.58%	13.89%	8.53%
Mayor before election
John Marks
Nonpartisan
Elected Mayor
John Marks
Nonpartisan

The 2006 Tallahassee mayoral election was held on September 5, 2006, to elect the Mayor of Tallahassee.

Incumbent mayor John Marks was reelected for 2nd term by over 77% of the vote.

== Results ==
2006 Tallahassee mayoral election
Party	Candidate	Votes	%	±%
Nonpartisan	John Marks (incumbent)	22,894	77.58	
Nonpartisan	Kim O'Connor	4,099	13.89	
Nonpartisan	Larry Hendricks	2,516	8.53	
