= 2006 West Lancashire District Council election =

2006 UK local government election

Results of the 2006 West Lancashire District Council election

The 2006 West Lancashire District Council election took place on 4 May 2006 to elect members of West Lancashire District Council in Lancashire, England. One third of the council was up for election and the Conservative Party stayed in overall control of the council.

After the election, the composition of the council was:

Party	Seats	±
Conservative	33	+3
Labour	22	-3

== Campaign ==
Before the election the Conservatives ran the council with a 4-seat majority over the Labour Party. Most seats only had Conservative and Labour Party candidates, with no Liberal Democrats standing in the election.

The Conservatives focused their campaign on crime and the environment, while targeting the Labour held wards of Burscough East, Burscough West and Scott. However Labour targeted the Conservative wards of Derby, Newburgh and Parbold, while criticising the Conservatives for holding a failed vote on transferring council housing.

== Election results ==
The results saw the Conservatives increase their control of the council, which they had held since 2002. They gained 3 seats from Labour in Burscough East, Burscough West and Scott wards, with the Labour leader on the council, Alan Bullen, saying that it had "not been a good night".

Overall turnout in the election was 32.2%, which was up on 2003 but down from 2004.

West Lancashire local election result 2006
Party	Seats	Gains	Losses	Net gain/loss	Seats %	Votes %	Votes	+/−
Conservative	13	3	0	+3	72.2	59.6	13,649	+12.2
Labour	5	0	3	-3	27.8	34.4	7,869	-2.5
Green	0	0	0	0	0.0	4.5	1,021	+1.2
Independent	0	0	0	0	0.0	1.5	344	-10.2
Clause 28	0	0	0	0	0.0	0.1	16	+0.1

== Ward results ==
=== Ashurst ===
Ashurst
Party	Candidate	Votes	%	±%
Labour	Ian Duffy	774	68.3	+10.9
Conservative	Richard Shepherd	360	31.7	+10.9
Majority		414	36.6	+1.1
Turnout		1,134	23.1	−10.3
Labour hold		Swing		

=== Aughton and Downholland ===
Aughton and Downholland
Party	Candidate	Votes	%	±%
Conservative	David O'Toole	1,271	75.2	−2.2
Labour	Gordon Rankin	419	24.8	+2.2
Majority		852	50.4	−4.4
Turnout		1,690	36.8	−12.6
Conservative hold		Swing		

=== Aughton Park ===
Aughton Park
Party	Candidate	Votes	%	±%
Conservative	Ian Grant	912	79.9	+1.9
Labour	Derek Latham	230	20.1	−1.9
Majority		682	59.8	+3.8
Turnout		1,142	36.3	+8.0
Conservative hold		Swing		

=== Burscough East ===
Burscough East
Party	Candidate	Votes	%	±%
Conservative	Ruth Melling	833	66.2	+5.6
Labour	Mary Whitby	426	33.8	−5.6
Majority		407	32.4	+11.2
Turnout		1,259	38.0	−11.7
Conservative gain from Labour		Swing		

=== Burscough West ===
Burscough West
Party	Candidate	Votes	%	±%
Conservative	David Griffiths	821	55.9	+3.7
Labour	Kathryn Anderson	649	44.1	−3.7
Majority		172	14.8	+10.4
Turnout		1,470	37.0	−4.6
Conservative gain from Labour		Swing		

=== Derby ===
Derby
Party	Candidate	Votes	%	±%
Conservative	Paul Greenall	867	57.9	+12.4
Labour	Jonathan Sockett	394	26.3	+1.0
Green	Anne Doyle	237	15.8	+9.1
Majority		473	31.6	+11.4
Turnout		1,498	32.2	−14.8
Conservative hold		Swing		

=== Hesketh-with-Becconsall ===
Hesketh-with-Becconsall
Party	Candidate	Votes	%	±%
Conservative	Christopher Ashcroft	844	85.0	+21.2
Labour	Christopher Mawdsley	149	15.0	+15.0
Majority		695	70.0	+42.4
Turnout		993	31.4	−11.4
Conservative hold		Swing		

=== Knowsley ===
Knowsley
Party	Candidate	Votes	%	±%
Conservative	Valerie Hopley	1,062	62.6	+1.2
Labour	Charles Cavaghan	409	24.1	−5.3
Green	John Watt	225	13.3	+4.1
Majority		653	38.5	+6.5
Turnout		1,696	36.9	−12.3
Conservative hold		Swing		

=== Moorside ===
Moorside
Party	Candidate	Votes	%	±%
Labour	Patricia Carson	505	79.7	−2.6
Conservative	Carolyn Evans	129	20.3	+2.6
Majority		376	59.4	−5.2
Turnout		634	21.8	−7.4
Labour hold		Swing		

=== Newburgh ===
Newburgh
Party	Candidate	Votes	%	±%
Conservative	Edward Pope	620	79.2	+7.0
Labour	Jacqueline Citarella	163	20.8	−7.0
Majority		457	58.4	+14.0
Turnout		783	45.1	
Conservative hold		Swing		

=== North Meols ===
North Meols
Party	Candidate	Votes	%	±%
Conservative	John Baldock	620	56.5	+7.6
Independent	Joan Draper	243	22.2	−14.0
Labour	Sarah Keegan	126	11.5	−3.3
Green	Nicholas Kemp	108	9.8	+9.8
Majority		377	34.3	+21.6
Turnout		1,097	22.0	−2.7
Conservative hold		Swing		

=== Parbold ===
Parbold
Party	Candidate	Votes	%	±%
Conservative	Robert Collinson	980	74.5	+15.7
Labour	Clare Gillard	335	25.5	+11.1
Majority		645	49.0	+17.0
Turnout		1,315	41.2	+0.9
Conservative hold		Swing		

=== Scarisbrick ===
Scarisbrick
Party	Candidate	Votes	%	±%
Conservative	William Cropper	853	69.5	−2.5
Labour	Shan Annis	209	17.0	−11.0
Green	Geoffery Barnes	166	13.5	+13.5
Majority		644	52.5	+8.5
Turnout		1,228	39.7	+13.1
Conservative hold		Swing		

=== Scott ===
Scott
Party	Candidate	Votes	%	±%
Conservative	David Meadows	863	47.2	−0.9
Labour	Noel Delaney	650	35.6	−2.2
Green	Maurice George	197	10.8	−3.3
Independent	Kenneth Walters	101	5.5	+5.5
Clause 28	David Braid	16	0.9	+0.9
Majority		213	11.6	+1.3
Turnout		1,827	39.4	−7.6
Conservative gain from Labour		Swing		

=== Skelmersdale South ===
Skelmersdale South
Party	Candidate	Votes	%	±%
Labour	David McKay	922	76.0	+12.4
Conservative	Susan Cropper	291	24.0	+4.3
Majority		631	52.0	+8.1
Turnout		1,213	23.7	−10.2
Labour hold		Swing		

=== Tanhouse ===
Tanhouse
Party	Candidate	Votes	%	±%
Labour	Robert Pendleton	482	64.4	−11.9
Conservative	Irene O'Donnell	179	23.9	+0.2
Green	Martin Lowe	88	11.7	+11.7
Majority		303	40.5	−12.1
Turnout		749	21.4	+5.1
Labour hold		Swing		

=== Tarleton ===
Tarleton
Party	Candidate	Votes	%	±%
Conservative	James Kay	1,371	86.0	+22.1
Labour	Pauline Roughley	223	14.0	+14.0
Majority		1,148	72.0	+44.2
Turnout		1,594	35.3	−15.2
Conservative hold		Swing		

=== Up Holland ===
Up Holland
Party	Candidate	Votes	%	±%
Labour	David Phythian	804	51.0	+3.0
Conservative	Ruth Pollock	773	49.0	+13.5
Majority		31	2.0	−10.5
Turnout		1,577	31.5	−13.7
Labour hold		Swing		
