= 2006 American Samoan general election =

General elections were held in American Samoa on 7 November 2006.

== Results ==
=== House of Representatives ===
District	Candidate	Votes	%
1 – Manuʻa	Fetu Fetui Jr.	351	25.94
1 – Manuʻa	Mapu Puaopea F. Paopao	276	20.40
1 – Manuʻa	Saoluaga T. Nua	269	19.88
1 – Manuʻa	Fa'auifono Vaitautolu	185	13.67
1 – Manuʻa	Talalemotu F. Mauga	173	12.79
1 – Manuʻa	Manusamoa Fiame	71	5.25
1 – Manuʻa	Seuga La'auli Seuga	28	2.07
2 – Manuʻa	Fonoti Savali Vaeao	176	42.82
2 – Manuʻa	Ali'ilelei P. Laolagi	147	35.77
2 – Manuʻa	Togia'i Fa'amoemoe Soli	88	21.41
3 – Vaifanua	Gaoteote P. T. Gaoteote	296	47.82
3 – Vaifanua	Simei Pulu	271	43.78
3 – Vaifanua	Tiapula Imo Mamea	52	8.40
4 – Saole	Agaoleatu C. Tautolo	329	100
5 – Sua #1	Tuialofi Faalae Lauatuaa Tunup	231	49.78
5 – Sua #1	Tumuatasi L. Mulitauaopele	125	26.94
5 – Sua #1	Epa Poyer	108	23.28
6 – Sua #2	Limutau F. C. Limutau	140	39.77
6 – Sua #2	Tiaiu Sapu Semeatu Maiava	118	33.52
6 – Sua #2	Talauega Letumu	94	26.70
7 – Maoputasi #1	Tali Ma'ae	212	44.26
7 – Maoputasi #1	Su'a Carl Schuster	162	33.82
7 – Maoputasi #1	Fa'afetao Folausaua Teofilo	105	21.92
8 – Maoputasi #2	Leapai Sipa Anoa'i	247	50.41
8 – Maoputasi #2	Matagi Ray Ma'ilo McMoore	243	49.59
9 – Maoputasi #3	Fiasili Puni E. Haleck	268	35.73
9 – Maoputasi #3	Henry Sesepasara	254	33.87
9 – Maoputasi #3	Leroy Ledoux	85	11.33
9 – Maoputasi #3	Pagopagoa Freddie Malala	79	10.53
9 – Maoputasi #3	Atuaia M. O. Atufili Mageo	48	6.40
9 – Maoputasi #3	Puia'i Manuma Tufele Jr.	16	2.13
10 – Maoputasi #4	Vaitoa Hans A. Langkilde	166	56.08
10 – Maoputasi #4	Taliutafa Liusa A. Young	130	43.92
11 – Maoputasi #5	Paopaoailua Joe Fiaui	252	51.53
11 – Maoputasi #5	Vasai Fred Vasai	161	32.92
11 – Maoputasi #5	Muaia'avaona Fofoga Pila	76	15.54
12 – Ituau	Archie Taotasi Soliai	738	30.76
12 – Ituau	Mary Lauagaia M. Taufetee	575	23.97
12 – Ituau	Fagasoaia Foa A. Lealaitafea	457	19.05
12 – Ituau	Valasi Seanoa Lavata'i Gaisoa	338	14.09
12 – Ituau	Charmaine Solaita Sili	291	12.13
13 – Fofo	Puletu D. Koko	301	34.44
13 – Fofo	Vaiausia Eliko Yandall	298	34.10
13 – Fofo	Fa'aitamai F. Fa'aita	230	26.32
13 – Fofo	Ta'afano Joseph Tavale	45	5.15
14 – Lealataua	Savali Talavou Ale	252	56.88
14 – Lealataua	Jacinta Agasiva Slater	191	43.12
15 – Tualauta	Mase Akapo	653	20.34
15 – Tualauta	Tagaloa Toloa Letuli	640	19.93
15 – Tualauta	Galu C. Satele Jr.	544	16.94
15 – Tualauta	Pili Falema'o M.	543	16.91
15 – Tualauta	Tula F. Solaita Jr.	326	10.15
15 – Tualauta	Mapu S. Jamais	235	7.32
15 – Tualauta	Robert Keith Maez	139	4.33
15 – Tualauta	Leomiti Faitamai	131	4.08
16 – Tualatai	Manu Talamoa	251	39.84
16 – Tualatai	Olo Ropati Atimalala Tagovailo	206	32.70
16 – Tualatai	Lopa T. Seti	157	24.92
16 – Tualatai	Peni Sapini Te'o	16	2.54
17 – Leasina	Atualevao Gafatasi Afalava	252	50.91
17 – Leasina	Tuaolotele Wesley Tuilefano	167	33.74
17 – Leasina	Lelepa Paulo Afalava	76	15.35

=== Delegate to the American House of Representatives ===
Candidate	Party	Votes	%
Eni Faleomavaega	Democratic Party	5,195	47.09
Amata Coleman Radewagen	Republican Party	4,493	40.72
Muavaefaatasi Ae Ae	Independent	1,345	12.19
Total		11,033	100.00
