= 2006 Peterborough County municipal elections =

Local election in Ontario, Canada

Elections were held in Peterborough County, Ontario on November 13, 2006 in conjunction with municipal elections across the province.

== Cavan-Millbrook-North Monaghan ==
2006 Cavan-Millbrook-North Monaghan election, Reeve of Cavan-Millbrook-North Monaghan
Candidate	Total votes	% of total votes
Neal Cathcart	1,398	48.37
Victor Norman	1,132	39.17
Dave Williams	360	12.46
Total valid votes	2,890	100.00

2006 Cavan-Millbrook-North Monaghan election, Deputy Reeve of Cavan-Millbrook-North Monaghan
Candidate	Total votes	% of total votes
Brian Fallis	1,644	57.66
Bill Jenkins	691	24.24
Dan Smith	516	18.10
Total valid votes	2,851	100.00

2006 Cavan-Millbrook-North Monaghan election, Councillor, Cavan Ward
Candidate	Total votes	% of total votes
Jim C. Chaplin	743	38.22
Andy Harjula	610	31.38
Alex Ruth	591	30.40
Total valid votes	1,944	100.00

2006 Cavan-Millbrook-North Monaghan election, Councillor, Millbrook Ward
Candidate	Total votes	% of total votes
Fern Armstrong	330	61.91
Paul Buck	203	38.09
Total valid votes	533	100.00

2006 Cavan-Millbrook-North Monaghan election, Councillor, Millbrook Ward
Candidate	Total votes	% of total votes
Brian Bartlett	235	58.31
Tim Belch	168	41.69
Total valid votes	403	100.00

== Smith-Ennismore-Lakefield ==
2006 Smith-Ennismore-Lakefield election, Reeve of Smith-Ennismore-Lakefield
Candidate	Total votes	% of total votes
(incumbent)Ron Millen	3,663	56.35
Greg Braund	2,837	43.65
Total valid votes	6,500	100.00

2006 Smith-Ennismore-Lakefield election, Deputy Reeve of Smith-Ennismore-Lakefield
Candidate	Total votes	% of total votes
Mary Smith	4,189	63.96
Dale Cavanagh	2,360	36.04
Total valid votes	6,549	100.00

2006 Smith-Ennismore-Lakefield election, Councillor, Ennismore
Candidate	Total votes	% of total votes
(incumbent)Donna Ballantyne	1,433	78.05
Jeff Standaert	403	21.95
Total valid votes	1,836	100.00

2006 Smith-Ennismore-Lakefield election, Councillor, Smith
Candidate	Total votes	% of total votes
(incumbent)Sherry Senis	1,910	57.41
Don Richardson	1,417	42.59
Total valid votes	3,327	100.00

2006 Smith-Ennismore-Lakefield election, Councillor, Lakefield
Candidate	Total votes	% of total votes
Anita Locke	687	53.80
Billy Nobels	590	46.20
Total valid votes	1,277	100.00

Source: Peterborough County: Who won what where, MyKawartha.com, 14 November 2006, accessed 20 January 2011.
