= 2006 Nuneaton and Bedworth Borough Council election =

2006 UK local government election

Map of the results

Elections to Nuneaton and Bedworth Borough Council were held on 4 May 2006. Half of the council was up for election and the Labour Party retained control of the council.

After the election, the composition of the council was

- Labour 18
- Conservative 15
- Liberal Democrat 1

== Election results ==
Nuneaton and Bedworth Council election, 2006 – Summary
| Party | Seats | Gains | Losses | Net gain/loss | Seats % | Votes % | Votes | +/− |
|---|---|---|---|---|---|---|---|---|
| Conservative | 8 | 4 | 0 | +4 | 47.1 | 51.3 | 15,555 | |
| Labour | 9 | 0 | 4 | -4 | 52.9 | 38.0 | 11,532 | |
| Liberal Democrats | 0 | 0 | 0 | 0 | 0.0 | 9.1 | 2,750 | |
| Socialist Alternative | 0 | 0 | 0 | 0 | 0.0 | 0.9 | 257 | |
| Independent | 0 | 0 | 0 | 0 | 0.0 | 0.7 | 223 | |

== Ward results ==
Nuneaton and Bedworth Borough Council Elections 2006: Abbey Ward
| Party | Candidate | Votes | % | ±% |
|---|---|---|---|---|
| Labour | Neil Phillips | 736 | 38.9 | |
| Liberal Democrats | Mish Whitmore | 676 | 35.7 | |
| Conservative | David Ellis | 480 | 25.4 | |
| Majority | | 60 | | |
| Turnout | | 1892 | | |
| Labour hold | | Swing | | |

Nuneaton and Bedworth Borough Council Elections 2006: Arbury Ward
| Party | Candidate | Votes | % | ±% |
|---|---|---|---|---|
| Conservative | Sonja Wilson | 616 | 45.7 | |
| Labour | Jill Shephard | 463 | 34.3 | |
| Liberal Democrats | Glen Dutton | 269 | 20 | |
| Majority | | 153 | | |
| Turnout | | 1348 | | |
| Conservative gain from Labour | | Swing | | |

Nuneaton and Bedworth Borough Council Elections 2006: Attleborough Ward
| Party | Candidate | Votes | % | ±% |
|---|---|---|---|---|
| Conservative | Peter Gilbert | 833 | 48.4 | |
| Labour | Gerald Hancock | 515 | 29.9 | |
| Liberal Democrats | James Hannon | 373 | 21.7 | |
| Majority | | 318 | | |
| Turnout | | 1721 | | |
| Conservative gain from Labour | | Swing | | |

Nuneaton and Bedworth Borough Council Elections 2006: Barpool Ward
| Party | Candidate | Votes | % | ±% |
|---|---|---|---|---|
| Labour | Francis McGale | 762 | 54.7 | |
| Conservative | Dharmy Patel | 632 | 45.3 | |
| Majority | | 130 | | |
| Turnout | | 1394 | | |
| Labour hold | | Swing | | |

Nuneaton and Bedworth Borough Council Elections 2006: Bede Ward
| Party | Candidate | Votes | % | ±% |
|---|---|---|---|---|
| Labour | Sheila Hancox | 924 | 59.4 | |
| Conservative | Alan Robinson | 760 | 40.6 | |
| Majority | | 292 | | |
| Turnout | | 1556 | | |
| Labour hold | | Swing | | |

Nuneaton and Bedworth Borough Council Elections 2006: Bulkington Ward
| Party | Candidate | Votes | % | ±% |
|---|---|---|---|---|
| Conservative | Des O'Brien | 1,552 | 70.1 | |
| Labour | Jeff Hunt | 663 | 29.9 | |
| Majority | | 889 | | |
| Turnout | | 2215 | | |
| Conservative hold | | Swing | | |

Nuneaton and Bedworth Borough Council Elections 2006: Camp Hill Ward
| Party | Candidate | Votes | % | ±% |
|---|---|---|---|---|
| Labour | Dennis Harvey | 644 | 52.4 | |
| Conservative | Elaine Grant | 585 | 47.6 | |
| Majority | | 59 | | |
| Turnout | | 1229 | | |
| Labour hold | | Swing | | |

Nuneaton and Bedworth Borough Council Elections 2006: Exhall Ward
| Party | Candidate | Votes | % | ±% |
|---|---|---|---|---|
| Labour | Tom Kenning | 750 | 39.5 | |
| Conservative | Reg Lovick | 653 | 34.4 | |
| Socialist Alternative | Margaret Hunter | 257 | 13.5 | |
| Liberal Democrats | Alice Field | 240 | 12.6 | |
| Majority | | 97 | | |
| Turnout | | 1900 | | |
| Labour hold | | Swing | | |

Nuneaton and Bedworth Borough Council Elections 2006: Galley Common Ward
| Party | Candidate | Votes | % | ±% |
|---|---|---|---|---|
| Conservative | Matthew Grant | 967 | 61.2 | |
| Labour | Alan Clarke | 612 | 38.8 | |
| Majority | | 355 | | |
| Turnout | | 1579 | | |
| Conservative gain from Labour | | Swing | | |

Nuneaton and Bedworth Borough Council Elections 2006: Heath Ward
| Party | Candidate | Votes | % | ±% |
|---|---|---|---|---|
| Conservative | Barry Lobbett | 808 | 50.2 | |
| Labour | John Glass | 802 | 49.8 | |
| Majority | | 6 | | |
| Turnout | | 1610 | | |
| Conservative gain from Labour | | Swing | | |

Nuneaton and Bedworth Borough Council Elections 2006: Kingswood Ward
| Party | Candidate | Votes | % | ±% |
|---|---|---|---|---|
| Labour | Geoff Ashford | 551 | 43.5 | |
| Conservative | John Waine | 493 | 38.9 | |
| Independent | Keith Kondakor | 223 | 17.6 | |
| Majority | | 58 | | |
| Turnout | | 1267 | | |
| Labour hold | | Swing | | |

Nuneaton and Bedworth Borough Council Elections 2006: Poplar Ward
| Party | Candidate | Votes | % | ±% |
|---|---|---|---|---|
| Labour | Robert Copland | 810 | 45.3 | |
| Conservative | Damon Brown | 631 | 35.3 | |
| Liberal Democrats | Kevin Moore | 346 | 19.4 | |
| Majority | | 179 | | |
| Turnout | | 1787 | | |
| Labour hold | | Swing | | |

Nuneaton and Bedworth Borough Council Elections 2006: Slough Ward
| Party | Candidate | Votes | % | ±% |
|---|---|---|---|---|
| Labour | Anthony Lloyd | 792 | 42.9 | |
| Conservative | John Carolan | 708 | 38.4 | |
| Liberal Democrats | Frank Mills | 346 | 18.7 | |
| Majority | | 84 | | |
| Turnout | | 1846 | | |
| Labour hold | | Swing | | |

Nuneaton and Bedworth Borough Council Elections 2006: St. Nicolas Ward
| Party | Candidate | Votes | % | ±% |
|---|---|---|---|---|
| Conservative | David Bryden | 1,441 | 61.4 | |
| Liberal Democrats | Peter Lee | 500 | 21.3 | |
| Labour | June Tandy | 406 | 17.3 | |
| Majority | | 941 | | |
| Turnout | | 2347 | | |
| Conservative hold | | Swing | | |

Nuneaton and Bedworth Borough Council Elections 2006: Weddington Ward
| Party | Candidate | Votes | % | ±% |
|---|---|---|---|---|
| Conservative | Gerald Smith | 1,809 | 74.7 | |
| Labour | Jeanette Clarke | 614 | 25.3 | |
| Majority | | 1195 | | |
| Turnout | | 2423 | | |
| Conservative hold | | Swing | | |

Nuneaton and Bedworth Borough Council Elections 2006: Wembrook Ward
| Party | Candidate | Votes | % | ±% |
|---|---|---|---|---|
| Labour | William Shephard | 911 | 56.5 | |
| Conservative | Stephen Paxton | 700 | 43.5 | |
| Majority | | 211 | | |
| Turnout | | 1611 | | |
| Labour hold | | Swing | | |

Nuneaton and Bedworth Borough Council Elections 2006: Whitestone Ward
| Party | Candidate | Votes | % | ±% |
|---|---|---|---|---|
| Conservative | Marcus Jones | 1,887 | 76.6 | |
| Labour | Philip Johnston | 577 | 23.4 | |
| Majority | | 1310 | | |
| Turnout | | 2464 | | |
| Conservative hold | | Swing | | |
