= 2006 Anaheim mayoral election =

- November 7, 2006
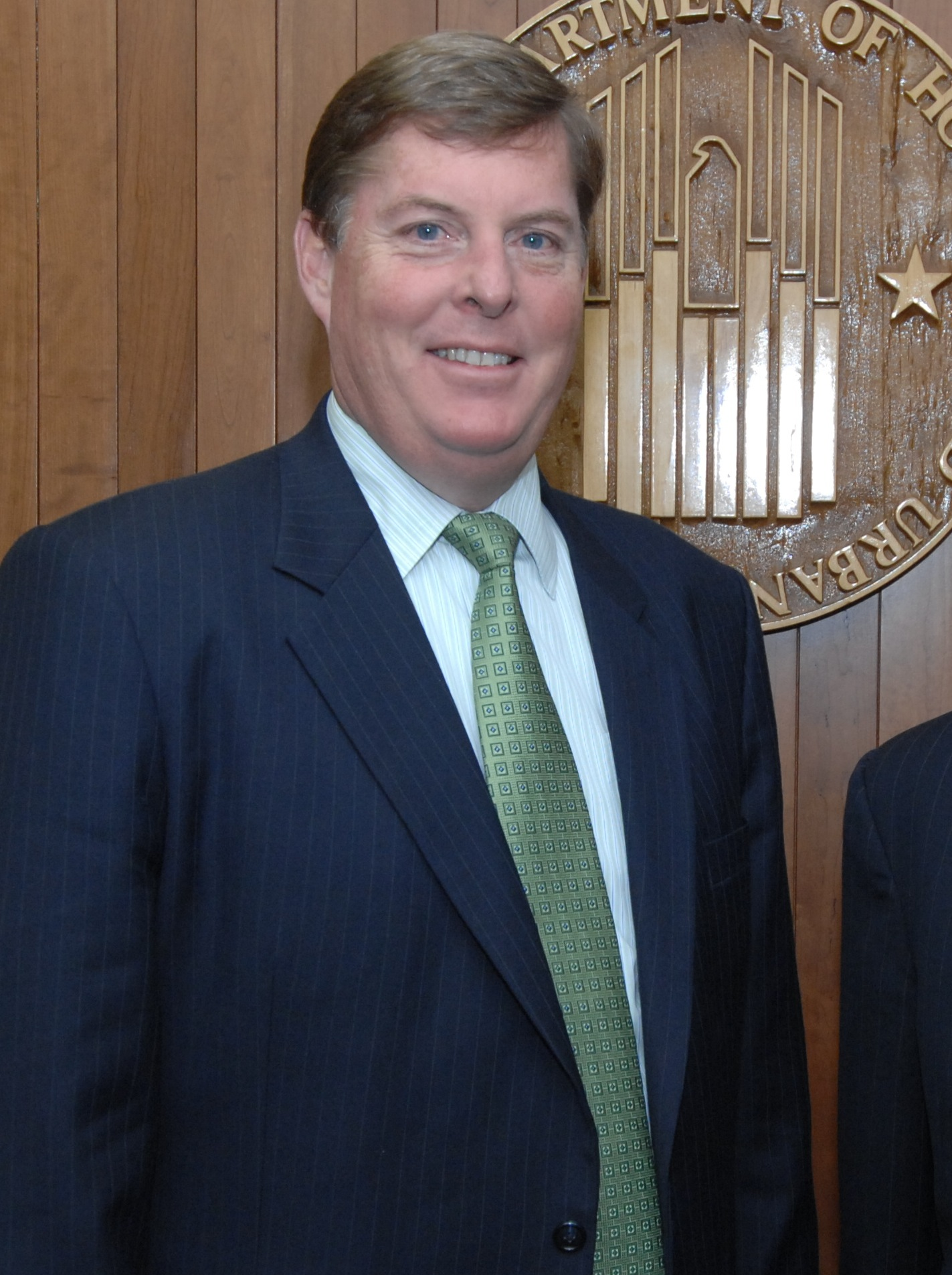

Candidate	Curt Pringle	William Fitzgerald
Party	Republican	Nonpartisan
Popular vote	41,449	11,004
Percentage	79.0%	21.0%
Mayor before election
Curt Pringle
Republican
Elected mayor
Curt Pringle
Republican

The 2006 Anaheim mayoral election was held on November 7, 2006, to elect the mayor of Anaheim, California. It saw the reelection of Curt Pringle.

== Results ==
Results
Candidate	Votes	%
Curt Pringle (incumbent)	41,449	79.0
William Fitzgerald	11,004	21.0
