= 2007 Fukagawa mayoral by-election =

The town of Fukagawa, Japan held a mayoral by-election on January 21, 2007. The former mayor, Junkichi Kawano, was arrested on bid-rigging charges. The by-election comes just three months after the ordinary election on October 1, 2006.

Mayoral by-election 2007: Fukagawa
Party	Candidate	Votes	%	±%
Liberal Democratic Party (LDP)	Takafumi Yamashita (山下 たかふみ)	8,041		
Independent	Harumichi Higashide (東出 はるみち)	4,441		
Japanese Communist Party (JCP)	Terumi Kitana (北名 照美)	3,797		
Turnout		16,279	77.44	
