= 2006 Welwyn Hatfield District Council election =

2006 UK local government election

Results of the 2006 Welwyn Hatfield Borough Council election

The 2006 Welwyn Hatfield District Council election took place on 4 May 2006 to elect members of Welwyn Hatfield District Council in Hertfordshire, England. One third of the council was up for election and the Conservative Party stayed in overall control of the council.

After the election, the composition of the council was:

- Conservative 32
- Labour 12
- Liberal Democrat 3
- Green 1

== Election result ==
The results saw the Conservatives increase their majority on the council to 16 seats after gaining 2 seats from Labour. The Conservative gains came in Haldens and Howlands wards, but they did lose one seat to the Liberal Democrats. The Liberal Democrats won Handside and came within 6 votes of taking Peartree from Labour after 4 recounts. Overall turnout in the election was 38.11%.

Welwyn Hatfield local election result 2006
Party	Seats	Gains	Losses	Net gain/loss	Seats %	Votes %	Votes	+/−
Conservative	13	2	1	+1	76.5	55.8	15,617	+8.4%
Labour	3	0	2	-2	17.6	22.5	6,309	-4.0%
Liberal Democrats	1	1	0	+1	5.9	21.1	5,898	-2.9%
Green	0	0	0	0	0	0.6	174	+0.1%

== Ward results ==
Brookmans Park and Little Heath
Party	Candidate	Votes	%	±%
Conservative	John Dean	1,630	80.4	+6.5
Liberal Democrats	Jennifer Blumsom	286	14.1	−3.1
Labour	Margaret White	111	5.5	−3.4
Majority		1,344	66.3	+9.6
Turnout		2,027	45.5	−2.0
Conservative hold		Swing		

Haldens
Party	Candidate	Votes	%	±%
Conservative	Martyn Levitt	641	41.7	+6.9
Labour	Bhavna Joshi	520	33.8	−4.6
Liberal Democrats	Win Smith	377	24.5	−2.3
Majority		121	7.9	
Turnout		1,538	35.5	−1.1
Conservative gain from Labour		Swing		

Handside
Party	Candidate	Votes	%	±%
Liberal Democrats	Nigel Quinton	1,127	45.0	−0.5
Conservative	Sue Collins	1,103	44.1	+0.5
Labour	Sarah Carthew	273	10.9	0.0
Majority		24	0.9	−1.0
Turnout		2,503	50.0	−5.0
Liberal Democrats gain from Conservative		Swing		

Hatfield Central
Party	Candidate	Votes	%	±%
Labour	Colin Croft	521	41.1	+6.6
Conservative	Douglas Berry	425	33.5	+5.3
Liberal Democrats	Lis Meyland-Smith	322	25.4	−11.9
Majority		96	7.6	
Turnout		1,268	31.4	−1.3
Labour hold		Swing		

Hatfield East
Party	Candidate	Votes	%	±%
Conservative	Nicola Dorrington	826	56.1	+4.9
Liberal Democrats	Roger Cashmore	324	22.0	+2.9
Labour	Constance Elliott	322	21.9	+0.1
Majority		502	34.1	+4.7
Turnout		1,472	37.1	−3.3
Conservative hold		Swing		

Hatfield North
Party	Candidate	Votes	%	±%
Conservative	Clare Berry	1,081	55.1	+11.4
Labour	Anthony Wilder	535	27.3	−10.0
Liberal Democrats	Richard Griffiths	345	17.6	−1.4
Majority		546	27.8	+21.4
Turnout		1,961	32.4	−4.2
Conservative hold		Swing		

Hatfield West
Party	Candidate	Votes	%	±%
Conservative	Nicholas Atkinson	757	49.7	+4.5
Labour	Dean Archer	531	34.9	+2.8
Liberal Democrats	Simon Archer	235	15.4	−7.4
Majority		226	14.8	+1.7
Turnout		1,523	37.7	−1.5
Conservative hold		Swing		

Hollybush
Party	Candidate	Votes	%	±%
Labour	Margarita Birleson	617	44.8	−1.5
Conservative	Stephen Battaglia	521	37.8	+3.8
Liberal Democrats	Hazel Jacquemain	239	17.4	−2.4
Majority		96	7.0	−5.3
Turnout		1,377	30.7	−4.5
Labour hold		Swing		

Howlands
Party	Candidate	Votes	%	±%
Conservative	Warren Davies	821	45.7	+6.9
Labour	Alan Chesterman	634	35.3	−2.8
Green	Mark Knight	174	9.7	+9.7
Liberal Democrats	Jonathan Arch	167	9.3	−13.7
Majority		187	10.4	+9.7
Turnout		1,796	41.1	+0.9
Conservative gain from Labour		Swing		

Northaw
Party	Candidate	Votes	%	±%
Conservative	John Nicholls	1,455	82.2	+20.8
Liberal Democrats	Nigel Bain	203	11.5	+2.7
Labour	Alex Breed	111	6.3	+0.6
Majority		1,252	70.7	+33.4
Turnout		1,769	42.4	−1.1
Conservative hold		Swing		

Panshanger
Party	Candidate	Votes	%	±%
Conservative	Sara Johnston	904	56.8	+10.2
Labour	William Longbottom	409	25.7	−1.1
Liberal Democrats	Marcel Naseby	279	17.5	−9.2
Majority		495	31.1	+11.3
Turnout		1,592	33.5	−2.2
Conservative hold		Swing		

Peartree
Party	Candidate	Votes	%	±%
Labour	Jacqueline Russell	453	36.5	−8.8
Liberal Democrats	Frank Marsh	447	36.0	+5.8
Conservative	Bernard Rosewall	341	27.5	+3.0
Majority		6	0.5	−14.6
Turnout		1,241	27.3	−3.1
Labour hold		Swing		

Sherrards
Party	Candidate	Votes	%	±%
Conservative	Christine Wheeler	1,100	54.5	+10.2
Labour	Margaret Hurst	571	28.3	−8.8
Liberal Democrats	Louise Lotz	346	17.2	−1.4
Majority		529	26.2	−25.4
Turnout		2,017	47.3	−4.3
Conservative hold		Swing		

Welham Green
Party	Candidate	Votes	%	±%
Conservative	Peter O'Brien	707	66.6	0.0
Labour	Bridgit Croft	198	18.7	+1.3
Liberal Democrats	Sheila Archer	156	14.7	−1.3
Majority		509	47.9	−1.3
Turnout		1,061	38.1	−3.0
Conservative hold		Swing		

Welwyn North
Party	Candidate	Votes	%	±%
Conservative	Steven Markiewicz	987	72.3	+7.6
Liberal Democrats	Helen Bassett	241	17.6	−4.1
Labour	Anthony Crump	138	10.1	−3.5
Majority		746	54.7	+11.7
Turnout		1,366	39.5	−3.7
Conservative hold		Swing		

Welwyn South (2)
Party	Candidate	Votes	%	±%
Conservative	Mandy Perkins	1,183		
Conservative	Carl Storer	1,135		
Liberal Democrats	John Blackburn	408		
Liberal Democrats	Ian Skidmore	396		
Labour	Sheila Jones	191		
Labour	Sheila Wilder	174		
Turnout		3,487	42.0	−5.4
Conservative hold		Swing		
Conservative hold		Swing		
