= 2006 Washington Supreme Court election =

The Washington Supreme Court justices are elected at large by the voters of the state of Washington. The general election was held in November 2006 and the primary was held in September 2006.

== Position 2 ==
=== Primary election ===
Washington State Supreme Court Justice Position #2 primary, 2006
| Party | Candidate | Votes | % |
|---|---|---|---|
| Nonpartisan | Susan Owens | 460,923 | 46.06 |
| Nonpartisan | Stephen Johnson | 347,732 | 34.75 |
| Nonpartisan | Michael Johnson | 83,308 | 8.33 |
| Nonpartisan | Richard Smith | 54,790 | 5.48 |
| Nonpartisan | Norman J. Ericson | 53,867 | 5.38 |
| Total votes | | 1,000,620 | 100.00 |

=== General election ===
Washington State Supreme Court Justice Position #2 election, 2006
| Party | Candidate | Votes | % |
|---|---|---|---|
| Nonpartisan | Susan Owens | 1,058,020 | 59.84 |
| Nonpartisan | Stephen Johnson | 710,144 | 40.16 |
| Total votes | | 1,768,144 | 100.00 |

== Position 8 ==
=== Primary election ===
Washington State Supreme Court Justice Position #8 primary, 2006
| Party | Candidate | Votes | % |
|---|---|---|---|
| Nonpartisan | John Groen | 465,680 | 45.65 |
| Nonpartisan | Gerry L. Alexander | 554,328 | 54.35 |
| Total votes | | 1,020,008 | 100.00 |

Having received a majority of the vote in the primary, Gerry Alexander wins the election under state law.

== Position 9 ==
=== Primary election ===
Washington State Supreme Court Justice Position #9 primary, 2006
| Party | Candidate | Votes | % |
|---|---|---|---|
| Nonpartisan | Jeanette Burrage | 403,255 | 40.35 |
| Nonpartisan | Tom Chambers | 596,095 | 59.65 |
| Total votes | | 999,350 | 100.00 |

Having received a majority of the vote in the primary, Tom Chambers wins the election under state law.
