= 2006 Kumamoto mayoral election =

Kumamoto, Japan, held a mayoral election on November 12, 2006.

Mayoral election 2006: Kumamoto
Party	Candidate	Votes	%	±%
Independent	Seishi Kōyama (幸山 政史)	164,387		
LDP, NKP	Tatsuzō Satō (佐藤 達三)	83,894		
Independent	Ryōichi Honda (本田 良一)	16,708		
Independent	Keiko Nakashima (中嶋 啓子)	14,630		
Turnout			53.75%	

== Sources ==
- (in Japanese) Japan-election coverage
- (in Japanese) ザ･選挙 -選挙情報-
