= 2006 Chatham-Kent municipal election =

The Chatham-Kent municipal election, 2006 took place on November 13, 2006, to elect a mayor, regional councillors and city councillors in the city of Chatham-Kent, Ontario, Canada. It was held in conjunction with all other municipalities in Ontario.

== Results ==
=== Mayoral race ===
Candidate	Vote	%
Randy Hope	11578	31.5
Diane Gagner (X)	9060	24.7
Walter Spence	7649	20.8
Chip Gordon	6532	17.8
Richard Erickson	1381	3.8
Jim Desat	265	0.7
Mary Kwong Lee	262	0.7

=== Municipal council ===
Candidate	Vote	%
West Kent Ward (1) (2 to be elected)
Bryon Fluker (X)	1968	
Brian W. King (X)	1917	
Kathy Cottingham	1559	
South Kent Ward (2) (3 to be elected)
Frank Vercouteren (X)	3701	
Karen Herman (X)	2541	
Art Stirling	2102	
Doug Jackson	1680	
William B. Scott (X)	1552	
Bob Goulet	1413	
John Roadhouse	1296	
Henry Regts	964	
Ken Bell	774	
Melanie Van Veen	641	
East Kent Ward (3) (2 to be elected)
Jim Brown (X)	2869	
Steve Pinsonneault	2005	
Mike Genge	1306	
Marg Eberle (X)	1201	
Jamie Meier	876	
Hans Van Der Doe	134	
North Kent Ward (4) (2 to be elected)
Bill Weaver (X)	2461	
Joe Faas (X)	2214	
Frank Letourneau	2026	
Aaron Neaves	901	
Mike Szucs	663	
Carl Evans	360	
Wallaceburg Ward (5) (2 to be elected)
Sheldon Parsons	2042	
Tom McGregor (X)	1725	
Kevin Blake	1269	
Mark Aarssen	759	
David Hyatt	524	
Bill Pollock	432	
Randy White	327	
Bill Arends	160	
John Todd	129	
Chatham Ward (6) (6 to be elected)
Douglas Sulman (X)	7716	
Marjorie Crew	6477	
Larry Mansfield Robbins (X)	5946	
Steve Pickard	5876	
Anne Gilbert (X)	5622	
Don R. Clarke (X)	5391	
Mel Crew (X)	5038	
Michael M. Bondy	5030	
Derek Robertson	4523	
Ben Labadie	4492	
Austin Wright	3263	
Edwin Martin	2455	
Pat McMahon	2378	
Paul Nixon	2179	
Paul Craig	1968	
Bruce Caldwell	1298	
John Willatt	774	
