= 2007 Rochdale Metropolitan Borough Council election =

2007 UK local government election

Elections to Rochdale Metropolitan Borough Council were held on 3 May 2007. One third of the council was up for election and the Liberal Democrats gained control of the council from no overall control.

After the election, the composition of the council was:

- Liberal Democrat 32
- Labour 20
- Conservative 8

== Election result ==
Rochdale local election result 2007
| Party | Seats | Gains | Losses | Net gain/loss | Seats % | Votes % | Votes | +/− |
|---|---|---|---|---|---|---|---|---|
| Liberal Democrats | 10 | 4 | 1 | +3 | 50.0 | 38.5 | 19,551 | -3.1 |
| Labour | 8 | 2 | 3 | -1 | 40.0 | 35.7 | 18,116 | +2.3 |
| Conservative | 2 | 0 | 2 | -2 | 10.0 | 25.3 | 12,857 | +1.8 |
| Independent | 0 | 0 | 0 | 0 | 0.0 | 0.5 | 241 | +0.5 |

== Ward results ==
Balderstone & Kirkholt
| Party | Candidate | Votes | % | ±% |
|---|---|---|---|---|
| Liberal Democrats | Liz Thirsk | 938 | 45.4 | −1.1 |
| Labour | Darren Pedley | 827 | 40.1 | +8.0 |
| Conservative | Darren Bayman | 299 | 14.5 | −6.9 |
| Majority | | 111 | 5.3 | |
| Turnout | | 2,064 | 27.7 | −1.1 |
| Liberal Democrats gain from Labour | | Swing | | |

Bamford
| Party | Candidate | Votes | % | ±% |
|---|---|---|---|---|
| Liberal Democrats | Andrew Abbott | 1,390 | 45.2 | −5.5 |
| Conservative | Ian Duckworth | 1,380 | 44.9 | +33.5 |
| Labour | John Orford | 302 | 9.8 | −28.1 |
| Majority | | 10 | 0.3 | |
| Turnout | | 3,072 | 40.2 | −1.2 |
| Liberal Democrats gain from Conservative | | Swing | | |

Castleton
| Party | Candidate | Votes | % | ±% |
|---|---|---|---|---|
| Liberal Democrats | Ted Flynn | 1,254 | 53.5 | −4.1 |
| Labour | Marie Williams | 519 | 22.1 | −4.5 |
| Conservative | Ronald Crossley | 332 | 14.2 | −1.6 |
| Independent | Frank Salt | 241 | 10.3 | +10.3 |
| Majority | | 735 | 31.4 | +0.4 |
| Turnout | | 2,346 | 30.4 | −1.6 |
| Liberal Democrats hold | | Swing | | |

Central Rochdale
| Party | Candidate | Votes | % | ±% |
|---|---|---|---|---|
| Labour | Farooq Ahmed | 1,875 | 51.1 | +2.0 |
| Liberal Democrats | Khalid Mahmood | 1,466 | 40.0 | −1.0 |
| Conservative | Roger Howarth | 325 | 8.9 | −1.0 |
| Majority | | 409 | 11.1 | |
| Turnout | | 3,666 | 47.7 | +0.5 |
| Labour gain from Liberal Democrats | | Swing | | |

East Middleton
| Party | Candidate | Votes | % | ±% |
|---|---|---|---|---|
| Labour | Donna Martin | 1,051 | 46.9 | +5.7 |
| Liberal Democrats | Rhoda Morley | 765 | 34.1 | −4.6 |
| Conservative | Cecelia Crossley | 426 | 19.0 | −1.1 |
| Majority | | 286 | 12.9 | +10.4 |
| Turnout | | 2,242 | 28.6 | +0.3 |
| Labour hold | | Swing | | |

Healey
| Party | Candidate | Votes | % | ±% |
|---|---|---|---|---|
| Liberal Democrats | Elwyn Watkins | 1,401 | 50.1 | +11.1 |
| Conservative | Andrew Neilson | 827 | 29.5 | +6.5 |
| Labour | Jim Moran | 571 | 20.4 | +6.9 |
| Majority | | 574 | 20.6 | +4.6 |
| Turnout | | 2,799 | 35.8 | −5.3 |
| Liberal Democrats hold | | Swing | | |

Hopwood Hall
| Party | Candidate | Votes | % | ±% |
|---|---|---|---|---|
| Labour | Susan Emmott | 1,583 | 61.4 | +8.2 |
| Conservative | Conal Brophy | 724 | 28.1 | −3.8 |
| Liberal Democrats | Malcome Heard | 272 | 10.5 | −4.4 |
| Majority | | 859 | 33.3 | +12.0 |
| Turnout | | 2,579 | 31.4 | +1.7 |
| Labour hold | | Swing | | |

Kingsway
| Party | Candidate | Votes | % | ±% |
|---|---|---|---|---|
| Liberal Democrats | Naim Mahmud | 1,185 | 44.7 | −0.6 |
| Labour | Tom Stott | 1,101 | 41.5 | −1.5 |
| Conservative | Philip Grantham | 364 | 13.7 | +2.0 |
| Majority | | 84 | 3.2 | |
| Turnout | | 2,650 | 33.3 | −0.9 |
| Liberal Democrats gain from Labour | | Swing | | |

Littleborough Lakeside
| Party | Candidate | Votes | % | ±% |
|---|---|---|---|---|
| Liberal Democrats | Rosemary Jones | 962 | 41.4 | −12.1 |
| Conservative | Frank Mills | 894 | 38.5 | +6.0 |
| Labour | John Hartley | 467 | 20.1 | +6.1 |
| Majority | | 68 | 2.9 | −18.1 |
| Turnout | | 2,323 | 29.7 | −1.1 |
| Liberal Democrats hold | | Swing | | |

Milkstone and Deeplish
| Party | Candidate | Votes | % | ±% |
|---|---|---|---|---|
| Labour | Imtiaz Ahmed | 1,794 | 48.5 | +9.9 |
| Liberal Democrats | Javed Iqbal | 1,719 | 46.4 | −7.6 |
| Conservative | Mudassar Razzaq | 188 | 5.1 | −2.3 |
| Majority | | 75 | 2.1 | |
| Turnout | | 3,701 | 48.7 | +1.1 |
| Labour gain from Liberal Democrats | | Swing | | |

Milnrow & Newhey
| Party | Candidate | Votes | % | ±% |
|---|---|---|---|---|
| Liberal Democrats | John Swift | 1,326 | 57.6 | +2.4 |
| Conservative | Michael Butler | 633 | 27.5 | +2.8 |
| Labour | Geoffrey Coady | 342 | 14.9 | −5.2 |
| Majority | | 693 | 30.1 | −0.4 |
| Turnout | | 2,301 | 29.6 | −0.7 |
| Liberal Democrats hold | | Swing | | |

Norden
| Party | Candidate | Votes | % | ±% |
|---|---|---|---|---|
| Conservative | Ann Metcalfe | 1,234 | 46.1 | +5.0 |
| Liberal Democrats | Joanne Payne | 1,153 | 43.0 | −6.2 |
| Labour | Anthony Bennett | 292 | 10.9 | +1.2 |
| Majority | | 81 | 3.1 | −5.0 |
| Turnout | | 2,679 | 35.6 | −0.5 |
| Conservative hold | | Swing | | |

North Heywood
| Party | Candidate | Votes | % | ±% |
|---|---|---|---|---|
| Liberal Democrats | Dorren Brophy-Lee | 847 | 43.5 | −6.5 |
| Labour | Jean Hornby | 791 | 40.7 | +4.5 |
| Conservative | Stephen Jones | 307 | 15.8 | +2.0 |
| Majority | | 56 | 2.8 | |
| Turnout | | 1,945 | 26.1 | −2.1 |
| Liberal Democrats gain from Labour | | Swing | | |

North Middleton
| Party | Candidate | Votes | % | ±% |
|---|---|---|---|---|
| Labour | Alan Godson | 921 | 51.4 | +7.6 |
| Conservative | David Harris | 552 | 30.8 | +5.1 |
| Liberal Democrats | Neil Lever | 319 | 17.8 | −12.7 |
| Majority | | 369 | 20.6 | +7.3 |
| Turnout | | 1,792 | 22.6 | −0.8 |
| Labour hold | | Swing | | |

Smallbridge & Firgrove
| Party | Candidate | Votes | % | ±% |
|---|---|---|---|---|
| Liberal Democrats | Brenda Kerslake | 903 | 43.8 | +3.0 |
| Labour | Sultan Ali | 785 | 38.1 | −0.3 |
| Conservative | Leonard Branton | 373 | 18.1 | −2.7 |
| Majority | | 118 | 5.7 | +3.3 |
| Turnout | | 2,061 | 27.2 | +0.5 |
| Liberal Democrats hold | | Swing | | |

South Middleton
| Party | Candidate | Votes | % | ±% |
|---|---|---|---|---|
| Labour | Peter Williams | 1,320 | 44.8 | +2.6 |
| Conservative | Sue Pawson | 1,266 | 43.0 | +0.1 |
| Liberal Democrats | Hilary Murray | 358 | 12.2 | −2.7 |
| Majority | | 54 | 1.8 | |
| Turnout | | 2,944 | 37.8 | +0.2 |
| Labour gain from Conservative | | Swing | | |

Spotland & Falinge
| Party | Candidate | Votes | % | ±% |
|---|---|---|---|---|
| Liberal Democrats | Gregory Couzens | 1,672 | 55.0 | −8.5 |
| Labour | Surinder Biant | 1,003 | 33.0 | +11.0 |
| Conservative | Steven Scholes | 363 | 11.9 | −2.6 |
| Majority | | 669 | 22.0 | −19.5 |
| Turnout | | 3,038 | 37.9 | +4.0 |
| Liberal Democrats hold | | Swing | | |

Wardle & West Littleborough
| Party | Candidate | Votes | % | ±% |
|---|---|---|---|---|
| Conservative | Janet Darnbrough | 1,591 | 67.8 | −0.2 |
| Liberal Democrats | Hilary Rodgers | 450 | 19.2 | −0.4 |
| Labour | Mike Radanovic | 305 | 13.0 | +0.7 |
| Majority | | 1,141 | 48.6 | +0.2 |
| Turnout | | 2,346 | 32.3 | −1.7 |
| Liberal Democrats hold | | Swing | | |

West Heywood
| Party | Candidate | Votes | % | ±% |
|---|---|---|---|---|
| Labour | Jacqueline Beswick | 1,142 | 56.0 | +8.8 |
| Conservative | John Kershaw | 454 | 22.3 | −1.6 |
| Liberal Democrats | Harry Boota | 443 | 21.7 | −7.2 |
| Majority | | 688 | 33.7 | +15.4 |
| Turnout | | 2,039 | 23.7 | −0.2 |
| Labour hold | | Swing | | |

West Middleton
| Party | Candidate | Votes | % | ±% |
|---|---|---|---|---|
| Labour | Terry Linden | 1,125 | 51.7 | −2.5 |
| Liberal Democrats | Terry Smith | 728 | 33.4 | +6.1 |
| Conservative | Dave Pawson | 325 | 14.9 | −6.4 |
| Majority | | 397 | 18.3 | −8.6 |
| Turnout | | 2,178 | 27.1 | +3.4 |
| Labour hold | | Swing | | |
