= 2006 Niigata mayoral election =

2006 election in Niigata, Japan

Niigata held a mayoral election November 12, 2006.

Mayoral election 2006: Niigata
Party	Candidate	Votes	%	±%
Independent	Akira Shinoda (篠田 昭)	188,028		
Independent	Makoto Ogishō (荻荘 誠)	52,440		
Independent	Hiroyuki Takahashi (高橋 弘之)	22,655		
Turnout			40.71%	

== Sources ==
- (in Japanese) Official results
- (in Japanese) ザ･選挙 -選挙情報-
