= 2006 Louisville mayoral election =

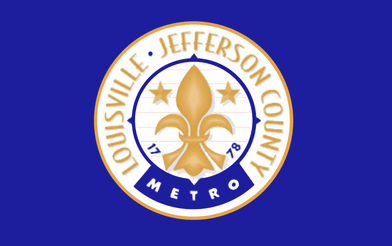
- November 7, 2006
- Turnout: 52.65%
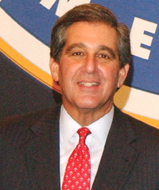

Candidate	Jerry Abramson	Kelly Downard	Ed Springston
Party	Democratic	Republican	Independent
Popular vote	164,843	76,709	3,521
Percentage	67.19%	31.27%	1.44%
Mayor before election
Jerry Abramson
Democratic
Elected mayor
Jerry Abramson
Democratic

The 2006 Louisville mayoral election was the second quadrennial Louisville Metro mayoral election, held on November 7, 2006. Incumbent mayor Jerry Abramson was re-elected to his second term in office.

== General election ==
Louisville mayoral election, 2006
Party	Candidate	Votes	%	±%
Democratic	Jerry Abramson (incumbent)	164,843	67.19%	−4.21%
Republican	Kelly Downard	76,709	31.27%	+6.79%
Independent	Ed Springston	3,521	1.44%	N/A
Write-in		258	0.10%	N/A
Total votes		245,331	100%	N/A
Democratic hold				
