= 2006 Maryland state elections =

2006 Maryland elections

The Maryland state elections of 2006 decided who would serve in hundreds of political offices throughout the state of Maryland in the United States. The primary elections were held on September 12, 2006, and the general election was held on November 7, 2006.

== Federal-level elections ==
- United States Senate election
- United States House of Representatives elections

== State-level elections ==
- Gubernatorial election
- Attorney General election
- Comptroller election
- House of Delegates elections
- Senate elections

== Local-level elections ==
- County executive elections
