= 2006 Shiga gubernatorial election =

Gubernatorial election

- 2 July 2006
- Turnout: 44.94 ▲6.27
Governor before election
Yoshitsugu Kunimatsu
LDP
Elected Governor
Yukiko Kada
SDP

A gubernatorial election was held on 2 July 2006 to elect the next governor of Shiga (石川県, Shiga-ken), a prefecture of Japan located in the Kansai region of Honshu island.

== Candidates ==
- Yoshitsugu Kunimatsu, 68, incumbent since 1998, former prefectural official in charge of general affairs and health and welfare matters. He was supported by the LDP, New Komeito, as well as the opposition DPJ.
- Yoshinori Tsuji, 59, labor union leader, endorsed by JCP.
- Yukiko Kada, 56, Kyoto Seika University Professor. She was backed by the SDP.

== Results ==
Shiga gubernatorial 2006
Party	Candidate	Votes	%	±%
Social Democratic	Yukiko Kada	217,842	46.03	n/a
LDP	Yoshitsugu Kunimatsu *	185,344	39.16	▼33,94
JCP	Yoshinori Tsuji	70,110	14.81	▼7,93
Turnout		477.661	44,94	▲6.27
Registered electors		1.062.792		
Swing to Social Democratic from LDP		Swing	6.87	
