= Valerie McDonald-Roberts =

American politician

Valerie McDonald-Roberts is an American politician. She has served as a school board representative, manager of Allegheny County’s Real Estate Department, Recorder of Deeds, and director of the Neighborhood Empowerment Department of Pittsburgh.

== Community and political experiences ==
Roberts served on the Pittsburgh school board from 1989 to 1993, including one year as president. In 1994 she was elected to Pittsburgh City Council, becoming the first African-American woman to hold that position. During her time on council, she was President Pro-tempre and chairperson of the Financial and Budget Committee. Her main issues while serving on the City Council board included urban redevelopment, education, minority rights, and budgetary issues. In 2001, she was elected Allegheny County Recorder of Deeds. When the office was eliminated in 2008, Roberts was appointed the manager of county's Department of Real Estate.

== Education ==
Roberts earned a B.S. in Medical Technology and an M.S. in Forensic Chemistry, both from the University of Pittsburgh, both summa cum laude.

=== Campaign for Allegheny County Controller ===
Roberts was a candidate for the 2011 Democratic nomination for the Allegheny County controller's office. Roberts lost the primary to Chelsa Wagner, who went on to win the office in the general election.
