= 2006 United Kingdom local elections =

- 4 May 2006

All 32 London boroughs, all 36 metropolitan boroughs, 20 out of 46 unitary authorities and 88 out of 238 English districts
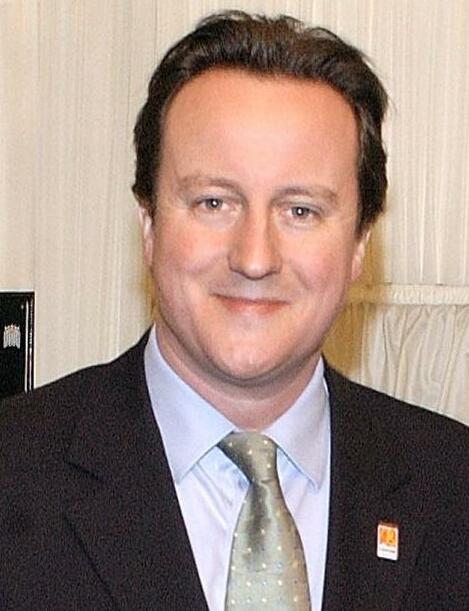

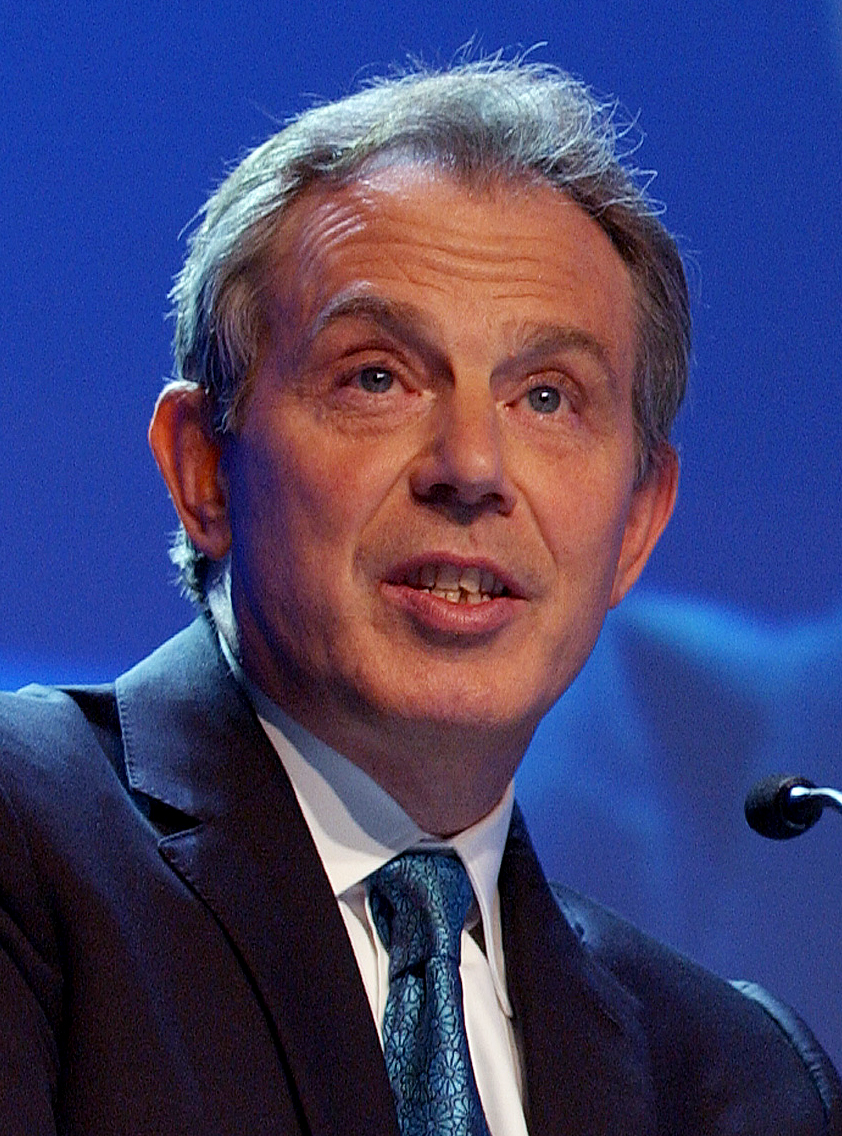

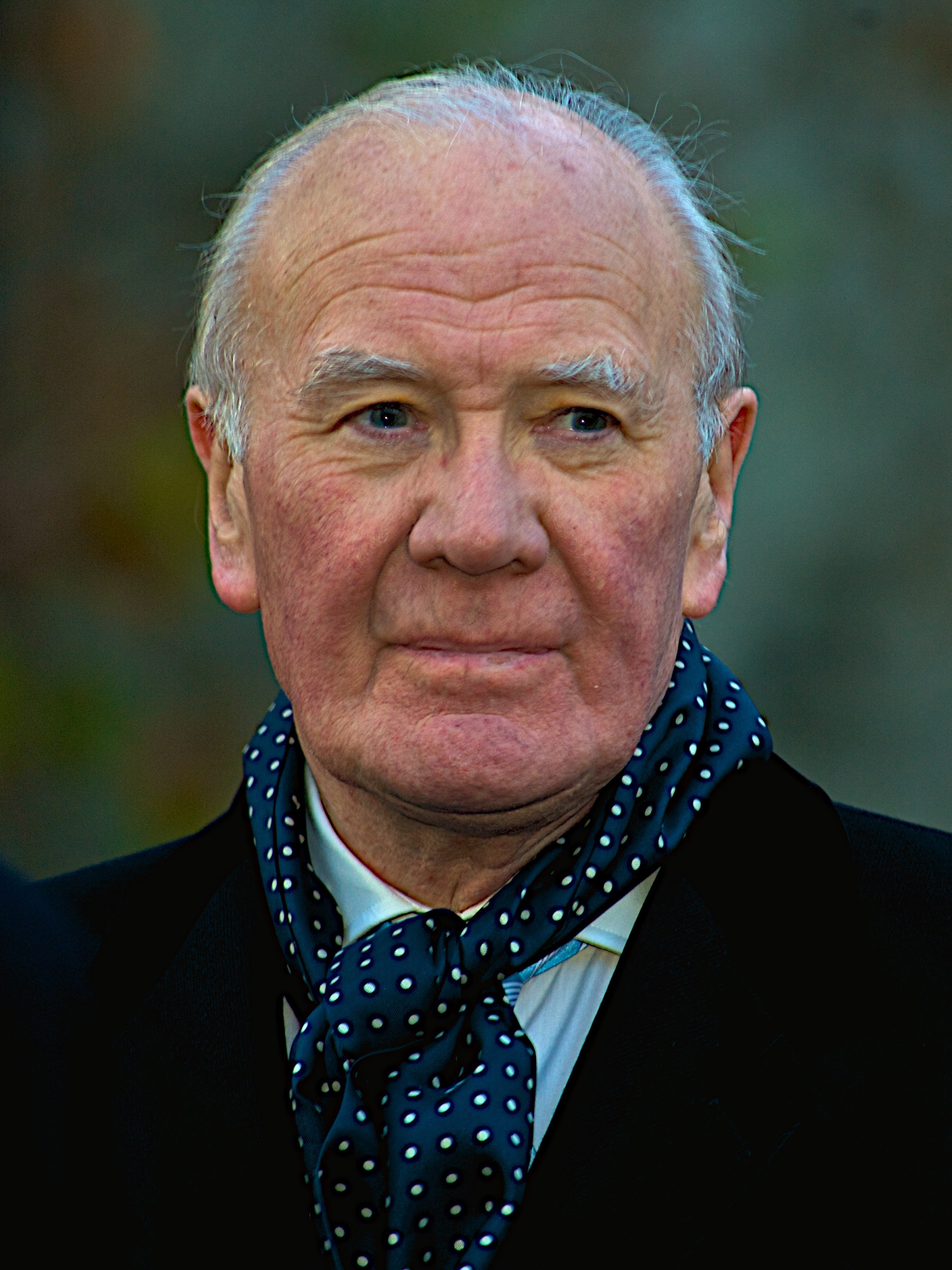
	First party	Second party	Third party
Leader	David Cameron	Tony Blair	Menzies Campbell
Party	Conservative	Labour	Liberal Democrats
Leader since	6 December 2005	21 July 1994	2 March 2006
Percentage	39%	26%	25%
Swing	▼1%	▼2%	Steady
Councils	68	30	13
Councils +/-	▲11	▼17	▲1
Councillors	1,830	1,439	909
Councillors +/-	▲316	▼319	▲2
- Colours denote council control following elections, as shown in the main table of results.

The 2006 United Kingdom local elections were held on Thursday 4 May 2006.

All London borough council seats were up for election, as well as a third of the seats on each of the metropolitan borough councils, and a third of some unitary authorities and shire districts. Several councils elected half of their seats: these were Adur, Cheltenham, Fareham, Gosport, Hastings, Nuneaton and Bedworth, and Oxford. Local elections follow a four-year cycle, and the 2006 election was the follow-on from the 2002 elections.

Mayoral contests were held in the London boroughs of Hackney, Lewisham and Newham, and in Watford. Crewe and Nantwich held a referendum on the issue of whether or not to have a directly elected mayor.

This was the first set of elections since David Cameron was elected leader of the Conservative Party. The Conservatives strengthened their position as the largest party in local government, making headway against Labour.

== Results ==
Note: Figures for number of councils and councillors is only in regard to those councils up for election in 2006, and does not include councils not up for election.

Party	Councillors		Councils	
Party	Number	Change	Number	Change
Conservative	1,830	▲316	68	▲11
Labour	1,439	▼319	30	▼17
Liberal Democrats	909	▲2	13	▲1
Residents	35	▼13	0	Steady
BNP	33	▲33	0	Steady
Green	29	▲20	0	Steady
Respect	16	▲13	0	Steady
Liberal	8	▼2	0	Steady
Health Concern	5	▲1	0	Steady
CPA	3	▲2	0	Steady
Socialist	3	Steady	0	Steady
UKIP	1	Steady	0	Steady
Other	0	Steady	0	Steady
No overall control	n/a	n/a	65	▲5

- Turnout was 36%, compared to 40% in 2004 and 33% in 2002.

== Pre-election predictions ==
On 7 April, a report produced by the University of Plymouth for Newsnight, based on results of council by-elections in the past three months, suggested that, compared to the 2002 local elections:

- Labour would increase their national vote share by 2% to 28% but that they would lose around 130 seats.
- The Conservatives would suffer a decrease in the national vote share of 4% leaving them with 33% and a loss of around 95 seats.
- The Liberal Democrats would increase their vote share by 2% to 29% and would gain around 190 seats.

This prediction may be seen to be almost entirely inaccurate.

== Projected national share ==
In an analysis for the Sunday Times, psephologists Colin Rallings and Michael Thrasher, of the University of Plymouth, produced an estimate of the national share of the vote. According to their calculations, the parties would have the following share of the vote:

- Conservative: 39%
- Labour: 26%
- Liberal Democrats: 25%
- Others: 10%

They note that this is estimate not intended to predict the vote share in an actual general election, because voters often vote differently in general elections due to local issues, or to a wish to "fire a shot across the government's bows" without actually removing it.

The BBC had a similar national share prediction, based on the results of 950 key wards:

- Conservative: 40%
- LibDem: 27%
- Labour: 26%
- Others: 7%

== Notable battles ==
- In Birmingham, the Acting Returning officer announced that the votes in the Kingstanding ward had been incorrectly tallied, incorrectly giving a win to the BNP's Sharon Ebanks, whereas she should have been in third place. The only way in which this result can be corrected is for one of the candidates to raise a petition to the courts; the council has said it will support in any way it can any candidates who wish to raise such a petition. Labour's Catherine Grundy did so, and was declared the rightful winner.
- In Crawley, after three recounts, one result showed 500 votes for the Labour candidate and 500 for the Conservative. As per electoral law, the candidates subsequently drew lots. The Conservative candidate Adam G. Brown won, giving his party a majority and switching the council from Labour to Conservative control for the first time since 1971.
- Another count was tied in St Albans, this time between Conservative and Lib Dem candidates on 1,131 votes each. The candidates drew lots with the Lib Dems winning, giving them a majority on the local council.
- In Chester the Conservatives were in third place in one ward, with around only 20% of the votes (in 2004), however they managed to win the seat with a majority of around 20%, and a 45% vote share. Their vote increased by over 110%, and was believed to be one of the largest increases in vote share (as a percentage) in the country.

== Campaign launches ==
UK Independence Party (UKIP) launched their local election campaign on 28 March 2006, where they put forward their policies for the local elections which included: the reduction of council tax by 50%; local binding referendums on major issues; and giving councils control of business rates and letting them receive the proceeds from stamp duty.

The Liberal Democrats' campaign launch was held on 3 April and was led by Sir Menzies Campbell MP.

Labour's campaign for the local elections was launched on 5 April and was led by the Prime Minister, Tony Blair MP (Lab, Sedgefield) and the Chancellor of the Exchequer and Blair's expected successor, Gordon Brown MP (Lab, Kirkcaldy and Cowdenbeath) in the wake of rumours of a split between the two over when Blair should stand down as Prime Minister.

Respect launched their election manifesto on 10 April 2006 calling the local elections a referendum on New Labour.

The Greens launched their campaign on 11 April, having already announced that 1,300 candidates will be standing across the country.

The BNP launched their election manifesto on 14 April. Soon after, Margaret Hodge, the Labour Employment Minister, told the press that 8 out of 10 white voters in her east London constituency of Barking admitted being tempted to vote for the BNP, hinting that the party's share of council seats was set to increase.

The Conservatives launched their campaign on 18 April. David Cameron, Eric Pickles, Caroline Spelman and Peter Ainsworth fronted a press conference that focused on environmental issues.

== Timeline ==
Date	Event
28 March	UKIP (UK Independence Party) launch local election campaign.
29 March	The London Communications Agency issue a study suggesting that the Conservatives would gain a minimum of six London Borough councils.
3 April	The Liberal Democrats launch local election campaign.
4 April	Independent anti-war strategic voting web site launched in London.
5 April	Labour launch their local election campaign. Conservatives offer a chance for "ordinary people" to appear in the local election broadcast.
10 April	Respect launch their local election campaign.
14 April	The British National Party launch their election campaign.
18 April	The first party election broadcast by the Labour Party depicts David Cameron MP (Con, Witney) as a chamleon and even launch a website to promote the idea. See also: Dave the Chameleon.
19 April	The Conservative Election Broadcast (using the tagline "Vote Blue Go Green") was presented by people responding to the Conservatives request for "ordinary people" as reported on 5 April 2006.
20 April	The Liberal Democrat Election Broadcast recounted the election of Menzies Campbell MP as leader.
24 April	The Green Party Election Broadcast asks voters to use their multi member vote to elect Greens onto their local council.
26 April	In a day described by the tabloid press as "New Labour's Black Wednesday", three cabinet ministers have three different 'crises' on the same day.
27 April	Liberal Democrat leader Sir Menzies Campbell MP challenges the Conservatives over their 'Vote Blue Go Green' campaign.
28 April	Local Government Minister David Miliband MP urges voters to "think local" rather than on national issues.
2 May	The Conservative Party and the Liberal Democrats criticise the Labour Party for taking credit for London's successful Olympic bid in their Party Election Broadcast. The West Midlands Police confirm their presence at Birmingham polling stations on election day amid fears of widespread ballot fraud.
3 May	The final PMQs before the election sees party leaders debating national scandals and Labour Party insiders predicting the worst results since 1968.
4 May	The Labour Party acknowledges it could face the loss of former strongholds and even slip into third place nationally in local government numbers.

== England ==
=== London boroughs ===
Council	Previous control	Result	Details
Barking and Dagenham	Labour	Labour hold	Details
Barnet	Conservative	Conservative hold	Details
Bexley	Labour	Conservative gain	Details
Brent	Labour	No overall control gain	Details
Bromley	Conservative	Conservative hold	Details
Camden	Labour	No overall control gain	Details
Croydon	Labour	Conservative gain	Details
Ealing	Labour	Conservative gain	Details
Enfield	Conservative	Conservative hold	Details
Greenwich	Labour	Labour hold	Details
Hackney	Labour	Labour hold	Details
Hammersmith and Fulham	Labour	Conservative gain	Details
Haringey	Labour	Labour hold	Details
Harrow	No overall control	Conservative gain	Details
Havering	No overall control	Conservative gain	Details
Hillingdon	No overall control	Conservative gain	Details
Hounslow	Labour	No overall control gain	Details
Islington	Liberal Democrats	No overall control gain	Details
Kensington and Chelsea	Conservative	Conservative hold	Details
Kingston upon Thames	Liberal Democrats	Liberal Democrats hold	Details
Lambeth	No overall control	Labour gain	Details
Lewisham	Labour	No overall control gain	Details
Merton	Labour	No overall control gain	Details
Newham	Labour	Labour hold	Details
Redbridge	Conservative	Conservative hold	Details
Richmond upon Thames	Conservative	Liberal Democrats gain	Details
Southwark	No overall control	No overall control hold	Details
Sutton	Liberal Democrats	Liberal Democrats hold	Details
Tower Hamlets	Labour	Labour hold	Details
Waltham Forest	No overall control	No overall control hold	Details
Wandsworth	Conservative	Conservative hold	Details
Westminster	Conservative	Conservative hold	Details

=== Metropolitan boroughs ===
One third of the seats in all 36 Metropolitan Boroughs were up for election.

Council	Previous control	Result	Details
Barnsley	Labour	Labour hold	Details
Birmingham	No overall control	No overall control hold	Details
Bolton	No overall control	No overall control hold	Details
Bradford	No overall control	No overall control hold	Details
Bury	Labour	No overall control gain	Details
Calderdale	No overall control	No overall control hold	Details
Coventry	No overall control	Conservative gain	Details
Doncaster	No overall control	No overall control hold	Details
Dudley	Conservative	Conservative hold	Details
Gateshead	Labour	Labour hold	Details
Kirklees	No overall control	No overall control hold	Details
Knowsley	Labour	Labour hold	Details
Leeds	No overall control	No overall control hold	Details
Liverpool	Liberal Democrats	Liberal Democrats hold	Details
Manchester	Labour	Labour hold	Details
Newcastle upon Tyne	Liberal Democrats	Liberal Democrats hold	Details
North Tyneside	No overall control	No overall control hold	Details
Oldham	Labour	Labour hold	Details
Rochdale	No overall control	No overall control hold	Details
Rotherham	Labour	Labour hold	Details
St. Helens	No overall control	No overall control hold	Details
Salford	Labour	Labour hold	Details
Sandwell	Labour	Labour hold	Details
Sefton	No overall control	No overall control hold	Details
Sheffield	Labour	Labour hold	Details
Solihull	Conservative	Conservative hold	Details
South Tyneside	Labour	Labour hold	Details
Stockport	Liberal Democrats	Liberal Democrats hold	Details
Sunderland	Labour	Labour hold	Details
Tameside	Labour	Labour hold	Details
Trafford	Conservative	Conservative hold	Details
Wakefield	Labour	Labour hold	Details
Walsall	Conservative	Conservative hold	Details
Wigan	Labour	Labour hold	Details
Wirral	No overall control	No overall control hold	Details
Wolverhampton	Labour	Labour hold	Details

=== Unitary authorities ===
One third of the council seats were up for election in 20 unitary authorities.

Council	Previous control	Result	Details
Blackburn with Darwen	Labour	Labour hold	Details
Bristol	No overall control	No overall control hold	Details
Derby	Labour^{[A]}	No overall control gain	Details
Halton	Labour	Labour hold	Details
Hartlepool	Labour	Labour hold	Details
Kingston upon Hull	No overall control	No overall control hold	Details
Milton Keynes	Liberal Democrats	No overall control gain	Details
North East Lincolnshire	No overall control	No overall control hold	Details
Peterborough	Conservative	Conservative hold	Details
Plymouth	Labour	No overall control gain	Details
Portsmouth	No overall control	No overall control hold	Details
Reading	Labour	Labour hold	Details
Slough	No overall control	No overall control hold	Details
Southampton	No overall control	No overall control hold	Details
Southend-on-Sea	Conservative	Conservative hold	Details
Stoke-on-Trent	Labour	No overall control gain	Details
Swindon	Conservative	Conservative hold	Details
Thurrock	Conservative	Conservative hold	Details
Warrington	Labour	No overall control gain	Details
Wokingham	Conservative	Conservative hold	Details

^{A} Derby council was in no overall control following the previous election in a Liberal Democrat/Conservative administration. Following a by-election in July 2005 Labour gained one councillor off the Liberal Democrats, thereby gaining control of the council.

=== District councils ===
==== Half of council ====
Council	Previous control	Result	Details
Adur	Conservative	Conservative hold	Details
Cheltenham	No overall control	No overall control hold	Details
Fareham	Conservative	Conservative hold	Details
Gosport	No overall control	No overall control gain	Details
Hastings	No overall control	Conservative gain	Details
Nuneaton and Bedworth	Labour	Labour hold	Details
Oxford	No overall control	No overall control hold	Details

==== Third of council ====
In 81 English district authorities one third of the council was up for election.

Council	Previous control	Result	Details
Amber Valley	Conservative	Conservative hold	Details
Barrow-in-Furness	Labour	No overall control gain	Details
Basildon	Conservative	Conservative hold	Details
Basingstoke and Deane	No overall control	No overall control hold	Details
Bassetlaw	No overall control	Conservative gain	Details
Bedford	No overall control	No overall control hold	Details
Brentwood	Conservative	Conservative hold	Details
Broxbourne	Conservative	Conservative hold	Details
Burnley	No overall control	No overall control hold	Details
Cambridge	Liberal Democrats	Liberal Democrats hold	Details
Cannock Chase	No overall control	No overall control hold	Details
Carlisle	No overall control	No overall control hold	Details
Castle Point	Conservative	Conservative hold	Details
Cherwell	Conservative	Conservative hold	Details
Chester	No overall control	No overall control hold	Details
Chorley	No overall control	Conservative gain	Details
Colchester	No overall control	No overall control hold	Details
Congleton	Conservative	Conservative hold	Details
Craven	No overall control	No overall control hold	Details
Crawley	Labour	Conservative gain	Details
Crewe and Nantwich	No overall control	No overall control hold	Details
Daventry	Conservative	Conservative hold	Details
Eastbourne	Conservative	Conservative hold	Details
Eastleigh	Liberal Democrats	Liberal Democrats hold	Details
Ellesmere Port and Neston	Labour	Labour hold	Details
Elmbridge	No overall control	No overall control hold	Details
Epping Forest	No overall control	No overall control hold	Details
Exeter	No overall control	No overall control hold	Details
Gloucester	No overall control	No overall control hold	Details
Great Yarmouth	Conservative	Conservative hold	Details
Harlow	No overall control	No overall control hold	Details
Harrogate	Conservative	No overall control gain	Details
Hart	No overall control	No overall control hold	Details
Havant	Conservative	Conservative hold	Details
Hertsmere	Conservative	Conservative hold	Details
Huntingdonshire	Conservative	Conservative hold	Details
Hyndburn	Conservative	Conservative hold	Details
Ipswich	No overall control	No overall control hold	Details
Lincoln	Labour	Labour hold	Details
Macclesfield	Conservative	Conservative hold	Details
Maidstone	No overall control	No overall control hold	Details
Mole Valley	No overall control	Conservative gain	Details
Newcastle-under-Lyme	Labour	No overall control gain	Details
North Hertfordshire	Conservative	Conservative hold	Details
Norwich	No overall control	No overall control hold	Details
Pendle	Liberal Democrats	Liberal Democrats hold	Details
Penwith	No overall control	No overall control hold	Details
Preston	No overall control	No overall control hold	Details
Purbeck	Conservative	Conservative hold	Details
Redditch	Labour	No overall control gain	Details
Reigate and Banstead	Conservative	Conservative hold	Details
Rochford	Conservative	Conservative hold	Details
Rossendale	Conservative	Conservative hold	Details
Rugby	No overall control	No overall control hold	Details
Runnymede	Conservative	Conservative hold	Details
Rushmoor	Conservative	Conservative hold	Details
St Albans	No overall control	Liberal Democrats gain	Details
Shrewsbury and Atcham	No overall control	Conservative gain	Details
South Bedfordshire	Conservative	Conservative hold	Details
South Cambridgeshire	No overall control	No overall control hold	Details
South Lakeland	No overall control	Liberal Democrats gain	Details
Stevenage	Labour	Labour hold	Details
Stratford-on-Avon	Conservative	Conservative hold	Details
Stroud	Conservative	Conservative hold	Details
Swale	Conservative	Conservative hold	Details
Tamworth	Conservative	Conservative hold	Details
Tandridge	Conservative	Conservative hold	Details
Three Rivers	Liberal Democrats	Liberal Democrats hold	Details
Tunbridge Wells	Conservative	Conservative hold	Details
Watford	Liberal Democrats	Liberal Democrats hold	Details
Waveney	Conservative	Conservative hold	Details
Welwyn Hatfield	Conservative	Conservative hold	Details
West Lancashire	Conservative	Conservative hold	Details
West Lindsey	Conservative	No overall control gain	Details
West Oxfordshire	Conservative	Conservative hold	Details
Weymouth and Portland	No overall control	No overall control hold	Details
Winchester	No overall control	Conservative gain	Details
Woking	No overall control	No overall control hold	Details
Worcester	Conservative	Conservative hold	Details
Worthing	Conservative	Conservative hold	Details
Wyre Forest	No overall control	No overall control hold	Details

== Bibliography ==
- Local elections 2006. House of Commons Library Research Paper 06/26.
- BBC Local Election Website
- Schedule of elections (Electoral Commission)
- Guide to England's 2006 elections (BBC)
- Overview (gwydir.demon.co.uk)
- Online hustings, manifestos and candidates for Lambeth (electionmemory.com)
