= 2006 Bedford Borough Council election =

2006 UK local government election

Results of the 2006 Bedford Borough Council election

The 2006 Bedford Borough Council election took place on 4 May 2006 to elect members of Bedford Borough Council in England. This was on the same day as other local elections.

Prior to the election, one councillor left the Labour group to sit as an independent.

== Summary ==
=== Election result ===
2006 Bedford Borough Council election
Party	This election				Full council			This election		
Party	Candidates	Seats	Net	Seats %	Other	Total	Total %	Votes	Votes %	+/−
Conservative	{{{candidates}}}	7	▲1	38.9	10	17	31.5	12,543	35.6	+3.3
Liberal Democrats	{{{candidates}}}	5	▲2	27.8	10	15	27.8	9,567	27.2	–0.5
Labour	{{{candidates}}}	3	▼2	16.7	9	12	22.2	7,589	21.5	–1.5
Independent	{{{candidates}}}	3	Steady	16.7	3	6	11.1	2,783	7.9	+6.2
Better Bedford Party	{{{candidates}}}	0	▼1	0.0	4	4	7.4	2,045	5.8	–2.7
Green	{{{candidates}}}	0	Steady	0.0	0	0	0.0	696	2.0	+1.4

== Ward results ==
=== Brickhill ===
Brickhill
Party	Candidate	Votes	%	±%
Conservative	Peter Hand*	1,639	48.7	+0.1
Liberal Democrats	Charles Royden	1,491	44.3	+4.4
Labour	Brian Anderson	235	7.0	−4.7
Majority		148	4.4	
Turnout		3,365	51.3	
Conservative hold		Swing		

=== Bromham ===
Bromham
Party	Candidate	Votes	%	±%
Conservative	Terence Rigby*	1,782	74.6	+0.1
Liberal Democrats	David Gallagher	244	10.2	−6.0
Labour	Nicholas Luder	233	9.8	−2.5
Green	David Maxwell	192	5.4	N/A
Majority		148	4.4	
Turnout		3,365	51.3	
Conservative hold		Swing		

=== Castle ===
Castle
Party	Candidate	Votes	%	±%
Independent	Apu Bagchi*	857	36.0	−10.8
Labour	Laurence Evans	527	22.2	−24.6
Conservative	David Fletcher	509	21.4	−16.4
Liberal Democrats	Lynda Aylett-Green	321	13.5	+2.3
Green	Saul Keyworth	164	6.9	N/A
Majority		330	13.8	
Turnout		2,378	37.8	
Independent gain from Labour		Swing		

=== Cauldwell ===
Cauldwell
Party	Candidate	Votes	%	±%
Labour	Robert Elford*	1,038	54.9	−8.9
Conservative	Katherine Stacey	546	28.9	+16.9
Liberal Democrats	Andrew Gerard	306	16.2	+1.0
Majority		492	26.0	
Turnout		1,890	30.9	
Labour hold		Swing		

=== Goldington ===
Goldington
Party	Candidate	Votes	%	±%
Liberal Democrats	Mahmud Rogers	977	45.9	−14.5
Conservative	Colin Crane	439	20.6	+8.0
Labour	Marilyn Leask	393	18.5	−3.5
Better Bedford Party	Martin Barlett	321	15.1	N/A
Majority		538	25.3	
Turnout		2,130	33.5	
Liberal Democrats hold		Swing		

=== Harpur ===
Harpur
Party	Candidate	Votes	%	±%
Conservative	Brian Dillingham	744	38.4	−3.4
Labour	Penelope Nicholls	719	37.1	−6.0
Liberal Democrats	John Ryan	218	11.2	+0.2
Green	Jennifer Foley	156	8.0	−2.5
Better Bedford Party	Alberto Thomas	102	5.3	N/A
Majority		25	1.3	
Turnout		1,939	32.5	
Conservative gain from Labour		Swing		

=== Harrold ===
Harrold
Party	Candidate	Votes	%	±%
Liberal Democrats	Nick Charsley	575	44.9	+28.0
Conservative	David Billington	507	39.6	−26.5
Independent	Martin Bridgman*	126	10.2	−55.9
Labour	Stephen Poole	37	2.9	−14.1
Green	Lucy Bywater	35	2.7	N/A
Majority		68	5.3	
Turnout		1,280	55.1	
Liberal Democrats gain from Conservative		Swing		

=== Kempston East ===
Kempston East
Party	Candidate	Votes	%	±%
Conservative	Charlotte Attenborough*	726	47.8	−4.3
Labour	Gillian Burley	589	38.8	−2.8
Liberal Democrats	Joan Slater	205	13.5	+6.8
Majority		137	9.0	
Turnout		1,520	34.4	
Conservative hold		Swing		

=== Kempston North ===
Kempston North
Party	Candidate	Votes	%	±%
Labour	Susan Oliver*	724	49.6	−12.8
Conservative	Mark Smith	592	40.6	+4.8
Liberal Democrats	Desmond Clarke	143	9.8	−1.5
Majority		132	9.0	
Turnout		1,459	36.5	
Labour hold		Swing		

=== Kempston South ===
Kempston South
Party	Candidate	Votes	%	±%
Conservative	Jasbir Parmar	775	40.5	+23.8
Labour	Shan Hunt*	622	32.5	−8.4
Better Bedford Party	Angela Parker	242	12.7	N/A
Liberal Democrats	Timothy Hill	192	10.0	−1.5
Green	Neil Foley	81	4.2	N/A
Majority		153	8.0	
Turnout		1,912	34.3	
Conservative gain from Labour		Swing		

=== Kingsbrook ===
Kingsbrook
Party	Candidate	Votes	%	±%
Liberal Democrats	Shirley McKay*	1,044	47.9	+4.4
Labour	Frank Garrick	607	27.8	−12.4
Conservative	Mohammed Kabir	529	24.3	+13.3
Majority		437	25.3	
Turnout		2,180	20.1	
Liberal Democrats hold		Swing		

=== Newnham ===
Newnham
Party	Candidate	Votes	%	±%
Conservative	John Mingay*	629	37.5	−2.4
Liberal Democrats	Stelios Mores	467	27.9	−2.5
Better Bedford Party	Edward Davey	265	15.8	N/A
Labour	June McDonald	255	15.2	−13.3
Green	Mark Steinhart	60	3.6	N/A
Majority		162	9.6	
Turnout		1,676	41.6	
Conservative hold		Swing		

=== Oakley ===
Oakley
Party	Candidate	Votes	%	±%
Independent	Patricia Olney*	686	87.4	+9.4
Liberal Democrats	Rosemary Smithson	63	8.0	+5.6
Labour	Franca Garrick	36	4.6	−3.0
Majority		623	79.4	
Turnout		785	42.7	
Independent hold		Swing		

=== Putnoe ===
Putnoe
Party	Candidate	Votes	%	±%
Liberal Democrats	Michael Headley*	1,716	54.2	+8.4
Conservative	Peter Allen	743	23.5	−2.8
Better Bedford Party	Raymond Hostler	478	15.1	N/A
Labour	Rosemary Roome	229	7.2	−2.9
Majority		973	30.7	
Turnout		3,166	48.3	
Liberal Democrats hold		Swing		

=== Queen's Park ===
Queen's Park
Party	Candidate	Votes	%	±%
Labour	Mohammed Yasin*	1,087	42.2	−23.0
Conservative	Parvez Akhtar	1,013	39.3	+26.2
Better Bedford Party	Michele Bonito	306	11.9	N/A
Liberal Democrats	Neal Bath	172	6.7	−3.3
Majority		74	2.9	
Turnout		2,578	51.7	
Labour hold		Swing		

=== Riseley ===
Riseley
Party	Candidate	Votes	%	±%
Independent	Ian Clifton*	1,027	85.4	+4.9
Independent	Patricia Grieve	87	7.2	N/A
Liberal Democrats	Paul Stekelis	46	3.8	+2.7
Labour	Terence Carroll	42	3.5	−0.7
Majority		940	78.2	
Turnout		1,202	56.3	
Independent hold		Swing		

=== Wilshamstead ===
Wilshamstead
Party	Candidate	Votes	%	±%
Conservative	Barry Huckle*	821	53.1	−10.3
Liberal Democrats	Malcolm Whiteman	523	33.8	+4.8
Labour	Jane Owen	132	8.5	N/A
Green	Justina McLennan	71	4.6	N/A
Majority		298	19.3	
Turnout		1,547	38.7	
Conservative hold		Swing		

=== Wootton ===
Wootton
Party	Candidate	Votes	%	±%
Liberal Democrats	Judith Cunningham*	864	47.3	−1.2
Conservative	Catherine Dale	549	30.0	−5.4
Better Bedford Party	John Bojczuk	331	18.1	N/A
Labour	Adrien Beardmore	84	4.6	−4.8
Majority		973	30.7	
Turnout		3,166	48.3	
Liberal Democrats hold		Swing		
