= 2006 Waveney District Council election =

2006 UK local government election

Map of the results

The 2006 Waveney District Council election took place on 4 May 2006 to elect members of Waveney District Council in England. This was on the same day as other local elections.

== Summary ==
2006 Waveney District Council election
Party	This election			Full council			This election		
Party	Seats	Net	Seats %	Other	Total	Total %	Votes	Votes %	+/−
Conservative	11	▲5	68.8	18	29	60.4	9,162	40.7	+2.7
Labour	3	▼4	18.8	9	12	25.0	5,798	25.7	-2.8
Independent	1	▼1	6.3	3	4	8.3	1,942	8.6	+1.9
Liberal Democrats	1	Steady	6.3	2	3	6.3	2,898	12.9	-0.6
Green	0	Steady	0.0	0	0	0.0	2,043	9.1	-1.3
UKIP	0	Steady	0.0	0	0	0.0	689	3.1	+0.2
