= 2006 Blackburn with Darwen Borough Council election =

2006 UK local government election

Elections to Blackburn with Darwen Borough Council were held in 2006 on 4 May – the same day as other local elections in the UK.

Results of the 2006 Blackburn with Darwen Borough Council election

== Election result ==
Summary of the 4 May 2006 local election results for Blackburn with Darwen Council
Parties	Seats	Previous	Net Gain/Loss
Labour	33	34	-2
Conservative	15	17	-2
Liberal Democrats	13	11	+2
England First	2	?	?
Independent	1	?	?
Total	64	64	

== Ward results ==
=== Audley ===
Audley
Party	Candidate	Votes	%	±%
Liberal Democrats	S. Lorgat	1,271		
Labour	T. Mahmood	1,090		
Spoilt Ballots				
Majority				
Turnout				
Liberal Democrats hold		Swing		

=== Bastwell ===
Bastwell
Party	Candidate	Votes	%	±%
Liberal Democrats	S. Ali	1,530		
Labour	I. Hussain	1,031		
Conservative	B. Law-Riding	206		
Spoilt Ballots				
Majority				
Turnout				
		Swing		

=== Beardwood with Lammack ===
Beardwood with Lammack
Party	Candidate	Votes	%	±%
Conservative	J. Hirst	1,504		
Labour	A. Whalley	432		
Spoilt Ballots				
Majority				
Turnout				
		Swing		

=== Corporation Park ===
Corporation Park
Party	Candidate	Votes	%	±%
Labour	J. Wright	803		
Conservative	J. Kenyon	635		
Liberal Democrats	M. Irfanullah	615		
Respect	I. Patel	272		
Spoilt Ballots				
Majority				
Turnout				
		Swing		

=== East Rural ===
East Rural
Party	Candidate	Votes	%	±%
Conservative	F. Slater	699		
Labour	O. Ozkaracan	47		
Spoilt Ballots				
Majority				
Turnout				
		Swing		

=== Ewood ===
Ewood
Party	Candidate	Votes	%	±%
Labour	J. Milburn	601		
BNP	N. Holt	491		
Conservative	J. Smith	445		
Spoilt Ballots				
Majority				
Turnout				
		Swing		

=== Fernhurst ===
Fernhurst
Party	Candidate	Votes	%	±%
England First		598		
Conservative		553		
Labour		304		
Green		156		
Spoilt Ballots				
Majority				
Turnout				
		Swing		

=== Higher Croft ===
Higher Croft
Party	Candidate	Votes	%	±%
Labour		659		
BNP		527		
Liberal Democrats		369		
Conservative		228		
Spoilt Ballots				
Majority				
Turnout				
		Swing		

=== Little Harwood ===
Little Harwood
Party	Candidate	Votes	%	±%
Labour		811		
Liberal Democrats		459		
Conservative		428		
BNP		367		
Spoilt Ballots				
Majority				
Turnout				
		Swing		

=== Livesey with Pleasington ===
Livesey with Pleasington
Party	Candidate	Votes	%	±%
Conservative		1,384		
BNP		527		
Liberal Democrats		400		
Labour		351		
Spoilt Ballots				
Majority				
Turnout				
		Swing		

=== Marsh House ===
Marsh House
Party	Candidate	Votes	%	±%
Liberal Democrats		799		
Conservative		563		
Labour		445		
Spoilt Ballots				
Majority				
Turnout				
		Swing		

=== Meadowhead ===
Meadowhead
Party	Candidate	Votes	%	±%
England First		858		
Labour		584		
Conservative		527		
Spoilt Ballots				
Majority				
Turnout				
		Swing		

=== Mill Hill ===
Mill Hill
Party	Candidate	Votes	%	±%
Labour		727		
BNP		437		
Conservative		268		
Liberal Democrats		266		
Spoilt Ballots				
Majority				
Turnout				
		Swing		

=== Queen's Park ===
Queen's Park
Party	Candidate	Votes	%	±%
Labour		902		
Liberal Democrats		320		
Conservative		303		
Spoilt Ballots				
Majority				
Turnout				
		Swing		

=== Roe Lee ===
Roe Lee
Party	Candidate	Votes	%	±%
Conservative		1,324		
Labour		568		
Spoilt Ballots				
Majority				
Turnout				
		Swing		

=== Shadsworth with Whitebirk ===
Shadsworth with Whitebirk
Party	Candidate	Votes	%	±%
Labour		758		
BNP		589		
Liberal Democrats		343		
Spoilt Ballots				
Majority				
Turnout				
		Swing		

=== Shear Brow ===
Shear Brow
Party	Candidate	Votes	%	±%
Liberal Democrats		1,520		
Labour		978		
Independent		199		
Spoilt Ballots				
Majority				
Turnout				
		Swing		

=== Sudell ===
Sudell
Party	Candidate	Votes	%	±%
Labour		854		
Liberal Democrats		842		
Spoilt Ballots				
Majority				
Turnout				
		Swing		

=== Sunnyhurst ===
Sunnyhurst
Party	Candidate	Votes	%	±%
Labour		865		
Conservative		514		
Liberal Democrats		435		
BNP		296		
Spoilt Ballots				
Majority				
Turnout				
		Swing		

=== Wensley Fold ===
Wensley Fold
Party	Candidate	Votes	%	±%
Labour		1,221		
Liberal Democrats		509		
Spoilt Ballots				
Majority				
Turnout				
		Swing		

=== Whitehall ===
Whitehall
Party	Candidate	Votes	%	±%
Liberal Democrats		902		
Conservative		329		
Labour		127		
Spoilt Ballots				
Majority				
Turnout				
		Swing		

== Wards ==
=== Corporation Park ===
Corporation Park
Party	Candidate	Votes	%	±%
Liberal Democrats	Muhammad Irfanullah	615	26.5%	
Conservative	James Kenyon	635	27.3%	
Respect	Ismail Ibrahim Bapu Patel	272	11.7%	
Labour	John Francis Wright	803	34.5%	
Majority		165	7.1%	
Turnout		2325		
Labour gain from Conservative		Swing		
