= 2006 Peterborough City Council election =

Local election in Peterborough, England

Results of the 2006 Peterborough City Council election

The 2006 Peterborough City Council election took place on 4 May 2006 to elect members of Peterborough City Council in England. This was on the same day as other local elections.

== Election result ==
2006 Peterborough City Council election
Party	This election			Full council			This election		
Party	Seats	Net	Seats %	Other	Total	Total %	Votes	Votes %	+/−
Conservative	14	▲4	63.6	23	37	64.9	20,095	47.2	+1.5
Independent	3	Steady	13.6	6	9	15.8	4,147	9.7	-2.9
Liberal Democrats	3	▲1	13.6	2	5	8.8	5,582	13.1	+2.1
Labour	0	▼4	0.0	3	3	5.3	9,082	21.3	-4.1
Liberal	1	▼1	9.1	2	3	5.3	3,687	8.7	+3.4
