= Dave the Chameleon =

British political mascot

Dave the Chameleon (in blue)

Dave the Chameleon was the British Labour Party's advertising slogan, and the basis of their political campaign, for the 2006 local elections. The campaign attempted to portray the recently elected leader of the Conservative Party and leader of the Opposition, David Cameron, as an ever-changing populist who will be whatever people want him to be. It was criticised as being a particularly negative form of campaigning, though some have disputed this. In particular, the BBC political editor Nick Robinson said "you say, the public hate negative advertising. To which I say – nonsense, poppycock and balderdash", adding that "they remember it when it's good".

In the event, Labour had a projected national share of the vote 13% behind the Conservatives.

== Broadcasts ==
A short video was first aired on British TV as a party political broadcast on behalf of the Labour Party on 18 April 2006. A sequel aired on 27 April. The episodes were also available on the campaign's website, which also included ringtones and a podcast version, until the website was closed.

== Message ==
Dave the Chameleon uses the chameleon's ability to change colour to mock the Conservative Party leader. They aim to show that Cameron will 'change his colours' to fit the opinions of the people he is speaking to at a certain time. The Labour Party claimed that this was a trick to hide his conservative values from others. This is part of a longer campaign to portray Cameron as an indecisive populist; indeed, John Prescott had described Cameron with the term 'Chameleon' some two months previously.

The broadcasts were accompanied by the song "Karma Chameleon" by Culture Club. In particular, the line "I'm a man, without conviction" can be heard during the broadcast.

== Plot ==
=== Episode 1 ===
The first episode details the biography of Dave. A blue David the Chameleon emerges from a blue egg—royal blue being the Conservative party's colour—and goes to school, wearing a straw hat, an allusion to his Etonian past. Dave, like David Cameron, joins the Conservative Party during its time in power under John Major, but when Major's government begins to collapse, Dave the Chameleon 'disappears' into the background to work in public relations (again reflecting Cameron's career).

According to the story, Dave the Chameleon learns several 'sneaky' skills in PR, making him a master of spin. He changes his name to the more informal 'Dave' and learns that, as a Chameleon, he can change his colours at will. As the narrator says:

And Dave the Chameleon changed into every colour of the rainbow, as he told everyone just what he thought they wanted to hear. But underneath it all he was still true blue, through and through.

Dave the Chameleon is then shown as very blue, accompanied with a quotation from David Cameron that "I am Conservative to the core of my being, as those who know me best will testify" (taken from an interview with The Daily Telegraph). He then turns red—the colour of the Labour Party—and is accompanied by the David Cameron quote that he is the "heir to Blair". Next Dave turns yellow—to reflect the UK's third biggest party, the Liberal Democrats—alongside Cameron's quote that "I'm a liberal Conservative". Dave then becomes green (and visits a solar panel shop), mocking David Cameron's attempts to make the Conservative Party more environmentally friendly, before finally turning blue. The campaign's tag line is: "Available in any colour (as long as it's blue)."

=== Episode 2 ===
The second episode of Dave the Chameleon's adventures was aired on 28 April, a week before the local elections (4 May). The plot of this episode is largely the same as that of the previous one, repeating some scenes and accusations. This second episode, however, twice links Dave to Black Wednesday, seen as being the low point in John Major's premiership. Ironically, the press had dubbed the previous day a 'Black Wednesday' for Tony Blair, after scandals involving John Prescott, Charles Clarke and Patricia Hewitt, three British Cabinet members. It also criticises the Tory manifesto for the 2005 general election, which Dave helped write, as a "little blue book ... which they loved, but nobody else did."

The second episode also makes references to Dave's trip to a glacier in Norway, parodying Cameron's similar visit; it makes the point that for an apparently pointless trip, the harm on the environment from Dave's flight would be high. Dave is shown "turning into his greenest green" and the advert displays the Conservative election slogan, "Vote blue, go green", to highlight Dave's colour changing tendencies.

Dave the Chameleon's specific colour changes are then mentioned; all of these show that he is "True Blue, through and through" and refer to apparent position changes from David Cameron. These include changes in policy on grammar schools, the minimum wage, flat tax, devolution, the Child Trust Fund programme, and the Iraq War. The narrator then refers to David Cameron directly by name (as opposed to Dave the Chameleon), saying:

David Cameron will tell you whatever he thinks you want to hear, because he knows you will never give him your vote if you see his true colours. Vote blue, and you will get blue. So help secure Britain's future.

The final scene shows the Vote Labour slogan, before ending.

== Criticisms ==
Many critics of the "Dave the Chameleon" broadcasts called them nothing but a personal attack on the Conservative leader, especially since the Labour Party later released a ringtone which impersonated David Cameron. Others have noted that the Conservatives, with their election slogan "vote blue, go green" have not effectively combatted this approach. The Labour Party claimed that the campaign was meant to be humorous and re-engage voters. By using ringtones and podcasts, they claimed to be campaigning to younger generations. However, other creatures appealing to younger generations used for the sale of mobile phone ringtones, most notably the Crazy Frog, had been banned from appearing on British television before the watershed. Ann Treneman, writing in The Times, said Labour had "plumbed new depths."

Other critics noted that Tony Blair, then leader of the Labour Party and Prime Minister, had done several of the things for which Cameron is criticised in the campaign; for example, critics mention that:

- Blair used the more familiar "Tony" in place of his much longer full name, Anthony Charles Lynton Blair.
- He, and much of his party, had "gone green".
- Blair had a fairly privileged education himself, attending Fettes College in Edinburgh (sometimes called the "Eton of Scotland").
- Blair and New Labour are often credited with introducing spin to the UK as an important element of political campaigning.

Commentators have also noted that the campaign was flawed to the extent that it shows Cameron in a positive light. It has been said that Conservative MPs like the Chameleon tag, as it encourages the idea that Cameron does not stick steadfastly to bad policies and listens to what people have to say.

At a reception for Conservative Fastrack in May 2006, David Cameron himself said that his two-year-old daughter described the chameleon as "that nice frog on the bike" and refers to it as "my favourite video".
