= 2006 Purbeck District Council election =

2006 UK local government election

Results of the 2006 Purbeck District Council election

Elections to Purbeck District Council were held on 4 May 2006. One third of the council was up for election and the Conservative Party stayed in overall control of the council. Overall turnout was 48.1%

After the election, the composition of the council was

- Conservative 14
- Liberal Democrat 8
- Independent 1
- Vacant 1

== Election result ==
Purbeck local election result 2006
Party	Seats	Gains	Losses	Net gain/loss	Seats %	Votes %	Votes	+/−
Conservative	6	1	0	+1	66.7	54.0	5,350	+4.8%
Liberal Democrats	2	0	0	0	22.2	35.1	3,480	-1.9%
Independent	1	0	1	-1	11.1	0	0	+0.0%
Labour	0	0	0	0	0	10.9	1,079	+1.6%

One Independent candidate was unopposed.

== Ward results ==
Bere Regis
Party	Candidate	Votes	%	±%
Independent	Peter Wharf	unopposed		
Independent hold		Swing		

Creech Barrow
Party	Candidate	Votes	%	±%
Conservative	Nicholas Cake	487	69.5	+18.3
Liberal Democrats	Keith Critchley	146	20.8	−10.3
Labour	Jack Killingback	68	9.7	−8.0
Majority		341	48.7	+28.6
Turnout		701	45.2	
Conservative hold		Swing		

Langton
Party	Candidate	Votes	%	±%
Conservative	Michael Lovell	485	71.9	+18.8
Liberal Democrats	Stephen Fazekas	130	19.3	−21.8
Labour	Leigh van de Zande	60	8.9	+3.1
Majority		355	52.6	+40.6
Turnout		675	51.7	
Conservative hold		Swing		

Lytchett Matravers
Party	Candidate	Votes	%	±%
Liberal Democrats	Michael Peacock	796	51.9	+8.5
Conservative	Colin Gibb	739	48.1	−8.5
Majority		57	3.8	
Turnout		1,535	52.3	
Liberal Democrats hold		Swing		

Purbeck West
Party	Candidate	Votes	%	±%
Conservative	Timothy Mills	396	71.4	+71.4
Labour	Jon Davey	159	28.6	−1.5
Majority		237	42.8	
Turnout		555	50.0	
Conservative gain from Independent		Swing		

Swanage North
Party	Candidate	Votes	%	±%
Conservative	Gloria Marsh	965	58.2	+3.0
Liberal Democrats	John Wootton	537	32.4	−1.1
Labour	Thomas Holmes	157	9.5	−1.7
Majority		428	25.8	+4.1
Turnout		1,659	49.5	
Conservative hold		Swing		

Swanage South
Party	Candidate	Votes	%	±%
Conservative	Gary Suttle	894	46.0	+10.4
Liberal Democrats	Anita Chennell	532	27.4	+5.1
Labour	Cherry Bartlett	516	26.6	−3.4
Majority		362	18.6	+13.0
Turnout		1,942	41.3	
Conservative hold		Swing		

Wareham
Party	Candidate	Votes	%	±%
Liberal Democrats	David Budd	1,339	60.4	+11.3
Conservative	Brian Jaeger	879	39.6	−11.3
Majority		460	20.8	
Turnout		2,218	47.9	
Liberal Democrats hold		Swing		

Winfrith
Party	Candidate	Votes	%	±%
Conservative	Keith Barnes	505	80.9	+23.6
Labour	Stephen Redmond	119	19.1	+19.1
Majority		386	61.8	+47.2
Turnout		624	47.0	
Conservative hold		Swing		
