= 2006 Wolverhampton City Council election =

2006 UK local government election

Map of the results of the 2006 Wolverhampton council election. Labour in red, Conservatives in blue and Liberal in orange.

2006 elections to Wolverhampton City Council were held on 3 May 2006 in Wolverhampton, England. One third of the council was up for election and the Labour Party kept overall control of the council.

Prior to the election, the composition of the council was:

- Labour Party 41
- Conservative Party 15
- Liberal Democrat 3
- Independent 1

After the election, the composition of the council was:

- Labour Party 40
- Conservative Party 17
- Liberal Democrat 2
- Liberal 1

== Ward results ==
Bilston East
Party	Candidate	Votes	%	±%
Labour	Stephen Simkins	1185	43.41	
Conservative	Ann Modi	710	26.01	
Independent	Tom Fellows	600	21.98	
Liberal Democrats	Roger Gray	217	7.95	
Majority		475	17.40	
Turnout		2,730	29.68	
Labour hold		Swing		

Bilston North
Party	Candidate	Votes	%	±%
Labour	Philip Page	1318	43.13	
Conservative	Gill Fellows	970	31.74	
UKIP	Kevin Simmons	325	10.63	
Liberal Democrats	Frances Heap	242	7.92	
Green	Eddie Clarke	195	6.38	
Majority		348	11.39	
Turnout		3,056	33.87	
Labour hold		Swing		

Blakenhall
Party	Candidate	Votes	%	±%
Labour	Judith Rowley	2314	71.20	
Conservative	John Corns	625	19.23	
Liberal Democrats	Edward Pringle	292	8.98	
Majority		1689	51.97	
Turnout		3,250	37.58	
Labour hold		Swing		

Bushbury North
Party	Candidate	Votes	%	±%
Conservative	Neville Patten	1571	47.06	
Labour	Paul Allen	1154	34.57	
Liberal Democrats	James Lindly	569	17.05	
Majority		417	12.49	
Turnout		3,338	37.00	
Conservative gain from Labour		Swing		

Bushbury South & Low Hill
Party	Candidate	Votes	%	±%
Labour	Paul Sweet	1187	55.60	
Conservative	Andrew Dawson	562	26.32	
Liberal Democrats	Ian Jenkins	364	17.05	
Majority		625	29.27	
Turnout		2,135	23.62	
Labour hold		Swing		

East Park
Party	Candidate	Votes	%	±%
Labour	Keith Inston	1351	52.45	
Conservative	Peter Dobb	733	28.45	
Liberal Democrats	Ann Whitehouse	472	18.32	
Majority		618	23.99	
Turnout		2,576	28.83	
Labour hold		Swing		

Ettingshall
Party	Candidate	Votes	%	±%
Labour	Andrew Johnson	1860	64.03	
Conservative	Brian Fellows	581	20.00	
Liberal Democrats	Eileen Birch	444	15.28	
Majority		1279	44.03	
Turnout		2,905	30.49	
Labour hold		Swing		

Fallings Park
Party	Candidate	Votes	%	±%
Labour	Steven Evans	1488	47.03	
Conservative	Carol Bourne	1159	36.63	
Liberal Democrats	Stephen Birch	496	15.68	
Majority		329	10.40	
Turnout		3,164	35.45	
Labour hold		Swing		

Graiseley
Party	Candidate	Votes	%	±%
Labour	Man Mohan Passi	2033	51.30	
Conservative	John Mellor	1440	36.34	
Liberal Democrats	Bryan Lewis	472	11.91	
Majority		593	14.96	
Turnout		3,963	44.04	
Labour hold		Swing		

Heath Town
Party	Candidate	Votes	%	±%
Labour	Caroline Siarkiewicz	937	42.61	
Liberal	Colin Hallmark	489	22.24	
Conservative	Lucinda Turner	484	22.01	
Liberal Democrats	David Jack	274	12.46	
Majority		448	20.37	
Turnout		2,199	28.43	
Labour hold		Swing		

Merry Hill
Party	Candidate	Votes	%	±%
Conservative	Christine Mills	2306	60.16	
Labour	Jagnandan Ghera	849	22.15	
Liberal Democrats	Jessica Pringle	639	16.67	
Majority		1457	38.01	
Turnout		3,833	40.85	
Conservative hold		Swing		

Oxley
Party	Candidate	Votes	%	±%
Labour	George Lockett	1335	48.37	
Conservative	Ian Lucas	1013	36.70	
Liberal Democrats	John Steatham	400	14.49	
Majority		322	11.67	
Turnout		2,760	30.02	
Labour hold		Swing		

Park
Party	Candidate	Votes	%	±%
Labour	Manohar Minhas	1405	36.61	
Liberal Democrats	Robin Lawrence	1277	33.27	
Conservative	Martin Berrington	1129	29.42	
Majority		128	3.34	
Turnout		3,838	44.74	
Labour hold		Swing		

Penn
Party	Candidate	Votes	%	±%
Conservative	Patricia Patten	2503	56.69	
Labour	Ricky Chima	1191	36.98	
Liberal Democrats	June Hemsley	686	15.54	
Majority		1312	29.72	
Turnout		4,415	44.05	
Conservative hold		Swing		

Spring Vale
Party	Candidate	Votes	%	±%
Liberal	Malcolm Gwinnett	1106	34.27	
Labour	William Langford	904	28.01	
Liberal Democrats	Sandra Terry	785	24.33	
Conservative	Robert Green	408	12.64	
Majority		202	6.26	
Turnout		3,227	37.00	
Liberal gain from Liberal Democrats		Swing		

St Peter's
Party	Candidate	Votes	%	±%
Labour	Tersaim Singh	1311	62.40	
Liberal Democrats	Alexandra Lawrence	408	19.42	
Conservative	Lionel Berry	372	17.71	
Majority		903	42.98	
Turnout		2,101	28.82	
Labour hold		Swing		

Tettenhall Regis
Party	Candidate	Votes	%	±%
Conservative	Barry Findlay	2654	66.95	
Labour	David Hartley	746	18.82	
Liberal Democrats	Colin Ross	541	13.65	
Majority		1908	48.13	
Turnout		3,964	43.09	
Conservative hold		Swing		

Tettenhall Wightwick
Party	Candidate	Votes	%	±%
Conservative	Andrew Wynne	3197	73.73	
Labour	Muhammad Khan	588	13.56	
Liberal Democrats	Philip Bennett	527	12.15	
Majority		2609	60.17	
Turnout		4,336	47.16	
Conservative hold		Swing		

Wednesfield North
Party	Candidate	Votes	%	±%
Conservative	David Bourne	1225	30.83	
Labour	Gwendoline Stafford Good	1157	29.12	
BNP	Dennis Organ	1016	25.57	
Independent	Arthur Newman	563	14.17	
Majority		68	1.71	
Turnout		3,973	44.00	
Conservative gain from Independent		Swing		

Wednesfield South
Party	Candidate	Votes	%	±%
Conservative	Matthew Holdcroft	1555	48.04	
Labour	Paul Kalinauckas	1194	36.89	
Liberal Democrats	Carole Jenkins	262	8.09	
Green	Stuart Hinde	212	6.55	
Majority		361	11.15	
Turnout		3,237	37.53	
Conservative hold		Swing		

== Number of candidates ==
Of the main political parties, both the Conservative Party and Labour Party fielded a full slate of 20 candidates each.

The Liberal Democrats fielded 19 candidates, failing to have a candidate in place in Wednesfield North.

One independent candidate stood in each of the following 2 wards:

- Bilston East
- Wednesfield North

The Green Party had a candidate in each of the following 2 wards:

- Bilston North
- Wednesfield South

The British National Party fielded only 1 candidate, in Wednesfield North ward.

The Liberal Party stood in only one ward, Heath Town.
