= 2006 Worcester City Council election =

2006 UK local government election

Map of the results of the 2006 Worcester council election. Conservatives in blue, Labour in red and Liberal Democrats in yellow. Wards in grey were not contested in 2006.

The 2006 Worcester City Council election took place on 4 May 2006 to elect members of Worcester City Council in Worcestershire, England. One third of the council was up for election and the Conservative Party stayed in overall control of the council.

After the election, the composition of the council was:

- Conservative 18
- Labour 11
- Liberal Democrat 3
- Independent 3

== Background ==
45 candidates competed in the election for the 12 seats which were being contested. Before the election the Conservatives had a one-seat majority with 18 of the 35 councillors, as compared to 10 Labour, 4 independents and 3 Liberal Democrats.

== Election result ==
The results saw the Conservatives defend what was regarded as their most marginal council in the country, however Labour did make one gain from an independent. The Conservatives were seen as having benefited from the troubles of the national Labour government which helped them stay in control of the council. Voter turnout was higher than expectations with Claines ward seeing a 49% turnout and Battenhall 43.1%.

Following the election the leader of the council, Stephen Inman, stood down and was succeeded by fellow Conservative councillor Simon Geraghty.

Worcester local election result 2006
Party	Seats	Gains	Losses	Net gain/loss	Seats %	Votes %	Votes	+/−
Conservative	6	0	0	0	50.0	39.7	8,458	-5.9%
Labour	5	1	0	+1	41.7	29.1	6,196	+0.3%
Liberal Democrats	1	0	0	0	8.3	13.0	2,764	-2.4%
Green	0	0	0	0	0	11.6	2,461	+11.6%
BNP	0	0	0	0	0	3.5	751	+1.9%
Independent	0	0	1	-1	0	3.2	673	-5.4%

== Ward results ==
Battenhall
Party	Candidate	Votes	%	±%
Conservative	David Tibbutt	1,015	57.0	
Labour	Christopher Winwood	374	21.0	
Liberal Democrats	Paul Griffiths	220	12.4	
Green	Ruth Stafford	171	9.6	
Majority		641	36.0	
Turnout		1,780	43.1	
Conservative hold		Swing		

Bedwardine
Party	Candidate	Votes	%	±%
Conservative	Barry Mackenzie-Williams	1,203	51.9	
Labour	Jennifer Barnes	547	23.6	
Liberal Democrats	Vaughan Hencher	315	13.6	
Green	Janet Dyer	252	10.9	
Majority		656	28.3	
Turnout		2,317	37.4	
Conservative hold		Swing		

Cathedral
Party	Candidate	Votes	%	±%
Conservative	Mohammed Riaz	1,127	48.3	
Labour	Matthew Lamb	597	25.6	
Liberal Democrats	Iain MacBriar	329	14.1	
Green	Martin Sullivan	280	12.0	
Majority		530	22.7	
Turnout		2,333	35.6	
Conservative hold		Swing		

Claines
Party	Candidate	Votes	%	±%
Liberal Democrats	Alexander Kear	1,649	51.9	
Conservative	Robert Campbell	1,067	33.6	
Labour	Colin Layland	253	8.0	
Green	Peter Robinson	209	6.6	
Majority		582	18.3	
Turnout		3,178	49.3	
Liberal Democrats hold		Swing		

Gorse Hill
Party	Candidate	Votes	%	±%
Labour	Geoffrey Williams	594	44.0	
BNP	Martin Roberts	331	24.5	
Conservative	Gordon Hazelton	200	14.8	
Independent	Dennis Powell	149	11.0	
Green	Linda Smith	76	5.6	
Majority		263	19.5	
Turnout		1,350	33.0	
Labour hold		Swing		

Nunnery
Party	Candidate	Votes	%	±%
Labour	Patricia Agar	711	32.5	
Independent	Stanley Knowles	524	24.0	
BNP	Michael Peat	420	19.2	
Conservative	Nicholas Turner	364	16.7	
Green	Alexander Gwinn	167	7.6	
Majority		187	8.5	
Turnout		2,186	36.0	
Labour gain from Independent		Swing		

Rainbow Hill
Party	Candidate	Votes	%	±%
Labour	Paul Denham	515	48.7	
Green	James Roberts	332	31.4	
Conservative	Wasib Shah	211	19.9	
Majority		183	17.3	
Turnout		1,058	25.1	
Labour hold		Swing		

St John
Party	Candidate	Votes	%	±%
Labour	Samuel Arnold	878	49.3	
Conservative	Melanie Heider	537	30.2	
Green	Clive Matthews	365	20.5	
Majority		341	19.1	
Turnout		1,780	30.1	
Labour hold		Swing		

St Peters Parish
Party	Candidate	Votes	%	±%
Conservative	Frank Tarbuck	856	59.0	
Liberal Democrats	Louis Stephen	251	17.3	
Labour	Richard Udall	219	15.1	
Green	Louise Diamond	125	8.6	
Majority		637	41.7	
Turnout		1,451	34.0	
Conservative hold		Swing		

Warndon
Party	Candidate	Votes	%	±%
Labour	Josephine Hodges	498	53.1	
Conservative	Colin Bruton	270	28.8	
Green	Catherine Wildish	170	18.1	
Majority		228	24.3	
Turnout		938	24.8	
Labour hold		Swing		

Warndon Parish North
Party	Candidate	Votes	%	±%
Conservative	Stephen Hodgson	730	46.5	
Labour	Marc Bayliss	676	43.1	
Green	Robert Wilkins	163	10.4	
Majority		54	3.4	
Turnout		1,569	39.1	
Conservative hold		Swing		

Warndon Parish South
Party	Candidate	Votes	%	±%
Conservative	Andrew Roberts	878	64.4	
Labour	John Buckley	334	24.5	
Green	Olaf Twiehaus	151	11.1	
Majority		544	39.9	
Turnout		1,363	34.2	
Conservative hold		Swing		
