= 2006 Penwith District Council election =

2006 UK local government election

Results of the 2006 Penwith District Council election

Elections to Penwith District Council were held on 4 May 2006. One third of the council was up for election and the council stayed under no overall control. The overall turnout was 39.5%

After the election, the composition of the council was:

- Conservative 14
- Liberal Democrat 12
- Independent 8
- Labour 1

== Results ==
Penwith local election result 2006
Party	Seats	Gains	Losses	Net gain/loss	Seats %	Votes %	Votes	+/−
Conservative	6	1	0	▲1	54.5	34.5	4,816	▲6.5
Liberal Democrats	5	0	1	▼1	45.5	40.0	5,572	▲9.6
Labour	0	0	0	Steady	0.0	10.5	1,466	▼1.6
Independent	0	0	0	Steady	0.0	5.0	698	▼17.9
Mebyon Kernow	0	0	0	Steady	0.0	3.9	546	▲2.0
UKIP	0	0	0	Steady	0.0	3.1	427	▼1.6
Green	0	0	0	Steady	0.0	3.0	419	New

=== By ward ===
Gulval & Heamoor
Party	Candidate	Votes	%	±%
Liberal Democrats	Jack Dixon	615	59.8	
Independent	Keith Perry	323	31.4	
Labour	Juliet Eavis	90	8.8	
Majority		292	28.4	
Turnout		1,028	37.4	−9.3
Liberal Democrats hold		Swing		

Gwinear, Gwithian and Hayle East
Party	Candidate	Votes	%	±%
Conservative	Anthony Pascoe	629	53.1	
Liberal Democrats	Robert Lello	555	46.9	
Majority		74	6.2	
Turnout		1,184	38.9	−5.3
Conservative gain from Liberal Democrats		Swing		

Hayle South
Party	Candidate	Votes	%	±%
Liberal Democrats	Duncan Cook	420	47.7	
Independent	Edgar Philp	327	37.2	
Labour	Jayne Ninnes	133	15.1	
Majority		93	10.5	
Turnout		880	30.7	−6.8
Liberal Democrats hold		Swing		

Lelant & Carbis Bay
Party	Candidate	Votes	%	±%
Conservative	Yvonne Watson	668	52.6	
Liberal Democrats	Richard Birch	305	24.0	
Green	Paula Richards	200	15.7	
Labour	Graham Webster	98	7.7	
Majority		363	28.6	
Turnout		1,271	43.3	−4.9
Conservative hold		Swing		

Ludgvan and Towednack
Party	Candidate	Votes	%	±%
Conservative	Henry Smith	718	54.8	
Liberal Democrats	John Moreland	471	35.9	
Labour	Adrian Marsham	122	9.3	
Majority		247	18.9	
Turnout		1,311	44.1	−7.1
Conservative hold		Swing		

Morvah, Pendenn & St Just
Party	Candidate	Votes	%	±%
Liberal Democrats	James Thomas	693	46.8	
Conservative	Richard Eddy	677	45.7	
Labour	Ann Round	111	7.5	
Majority		16	1.1	
Turnout		1,481	39.2	−10.7
Liberal Democrats hold		Swing		

Penzance Central
Party	Candidate	Votes	%	±%
Conservative	Graeme Stevens	402	35.5	
Liberal Democrats	Melville Durrant	317	28.0	
Labour	Cornelius Olivier	278	24.6	
Mebyon Kernow	Phillip Rendle	135	11.9	
Majority		85	7.5	
Turnout		1,132	39.1	−6.8
Conservative hold		Swing		

Penzance East
Party	Candidate	Votes	%	±%
Liberal Democrats	Peter Mates	768	52.2	
UKIP	Richard Barnes	264	18.0	
Conservative	Peter Powell	252	17.1	
Labour	Timothy Pullen	186	12.7	
Majority		504	34.2	
Turnout		1,470	33.1	−6.5
Liberal Democrats hold		Swing		

Penzance Promenade
Party	Candidate	Votes	%	±%
Conservative	Emma Schofield	556	45.6	
Liberal Democrats	Mark Squire	377	31.0	
Mebyon Kernow	Richard Clark	171	14.0	
Labour	Nicholas Round	114	9.4	
Majority		179	14.6	
Turnout		1,218	48.2	−5.5
Conservative hold		Swing		

Penzance South
Party	Candidate	Votes	%	±%
Conservative	Malcolm Pilcher	696	39.4	
Liberal Democrats	Ruth Lewarne	456	25.8	
Mebyon Kernow	Frank Granger	240	13.6	
UKIP	Michael Faulkner	163	9.2	
Labour	Sara Olivier	163	9.2	
Independent	Pamela Gray	48	2.7	
Majority		240	13.6	
Turnout		1,766	45.4	−10.6
Conservative hold		Swing		

St Ives North
Party	Candidate	Votes	%	±%
Liberal Democrats	George Tonkin	595	49.5	
Green	Katrina Slack	219	18.2	
Conservative	Margaret Powell	218	18.1	
Labour	Terence Murray	171	14.2	
Majority		376	31.3	
Turnout		1,203	38.2	−3.8
Liberal Democrats hold		Swing		
