= 2006 Shrewsbury and Atcham Borough Council election =

2006 local election in England, UK

← 2004	4 May 2006	2007 →

14 seats to Shrewsbury and Atcham Borough Council

	First party	Second party	Third party
Party	Conservative	Labour	Liberal Democrats
Last election	8	4	1
Seats won	8	3	3
Seats after	22	10	6
Popular vote	7,587	4,699	3,970
Percentage	43.2%	26.7%	22.6%
- Results of the 2006 Shrewsbury and Atcham Borough Council election
Council control before election
No Overall Control
Elected Council control
Conservative Party

Elections to Shrewsbury and Atcham Borough Council took place on 4 May 2006. One third of the council was up for election and the Conservative Party stayed in overall control of the council.

== Election result ==
Shrewsbury and Atcham local election result 2006
Party	Votes	Votes %	Seats won	Total seats	Seats %	Net gain/loss
Conservative	7,587	43.2	8	22	55	▲2
Labour	4,699	26.7	3	10	25	Steady
Liberal Democrats	3,970	22.6	3	6	15	Steady
Others	1,325	7.5	0	2	5	▼2
Total	17,583	100	14	40	100	N/A
Source:Local Elections Archive Project, BBC

== Ward results ==
Bagley
Party	Candidate	Votes	%
Liberal Democrats	David Farmer	538	46.7
Conservative	James Nason	307	26.6
Labour	John Turnbull	212	18.4
Green	Toby Green	96	8.3
Total votes		1,153	100
Liberal Democrats hold			

Battlefield and Heathgates
Party	Candidate	Votes	%
Conservative	Malcolm Price	577	55.7
Labour	John Lewis	303	29.3
Liberal Democrats	Janine Clarke	155	15.0
Total votes		1,035	100
Conservative hold			

Belle Vue
Party	Candidate	Votes	%
Labour	Alan Townsend	839	53.7
Conservative	Martin Millington	343	22.0
Green	Emma Bullard	243	15.6
Liberal Democrats	Caroline Cheyne	137	8.8
Total votes		1,562	100
Labour hold			

Bowbrook
Party	Candidate	Votes	%
Conservative	Peter Adams	988	67.3
Labour	Robert Curzon	481	32.7
Total votes		1,469	100
Conservative hold			

Condover
Party	Candidate	Votes	%
Conservative	Tom Hendry	516	57.3
Independent	Edna Francis	385	42.7
Total votes		901	100
Conservative gain from Independent			

Copthorne
Party	Candidate	Votes	%
Conservative	Peter Nutting	968	52.7
Liberal Democrats	Margaret Hamer	632	34.4
Labour	Charles Wilson	143	7.8
Green	Huw Peach	93	5.1
Total votes		1,836	100
Conservative hold			

Harlescott
Party	Candidate	Votes	%
Conservative	Eileen Sandford	812	52.7
Labour	Ioan Jones	488	31.7
BNP	Karl Foulkes	171	11.1
Liberal Democrats	Anne Woolland	70	4.5
Total votes		1,541	100
Conservative gain from Labour			

Lawley
Party	Candidate	Votes	%
Conservative	Jill Chaplin	Unopposed	N/A
Conservative hold			

Monkmoor
Party	Candidate	Votes	%
Liberal Democrats	John Durnell	681	48.5
Labour	Lou Gladden	484	34.5
Conservative	Anthony Randall	238	17.0
Total votes		1,403	100
Liberal Democrats hold			

Porthill
Party	Candidate	Votes	%
Liberal Democrats	Anne Chebsey	901	51.2
Conservative	Clive Pugh	636	36.1
Green	Keith O'Neill	118	6.7
Labour	Stacey Dower	105	6.0
Total votes		1,760	100
Liberal Democrats gain from Conservative			

Rea Valley
Party	Candidate	Votes	%
Conservative	David Sheppard	978	59.6
Liberal Democrats	David Ryder	419	25.5
Green	Jonathan Brown	124	7.6
Labour	Christine Griffiths	121	7.4
Total votes		1,642	100
Conservative hold			

Severn Valley
Party	Candidate	Votes	%
Conservative	Charles Armstrong	519	78.9
Liberal Democrats	Geraldine Cook	139	21.1
Total votes		658	100
Conservative hold			

Sundorne
Party	Candidate	Votes	%
Labour	Joyce Allaway	564	58.3
Conservative	Ian Lloyd-Jones	252	26.1
Liberal Democrats	Colin Dowse	151	15.6
Total votes		967	100
Labour hold			

Sutton and Reabrook
Party	Candidate	Votes	%
Labour	Liz Parsons	959	58.0
Conservative	Keith Roberts	453	27.4
Liberal Democrats	John Roverts	147	8.9
BNP	Helen Foulkes	95	5.7
Total votes		1,654	100
Labour hold			
