= 2006 Ellesmere Port and Neston Borough Council election =

2006 UK local government election

Results of the 2006 Ellesmere Port and Neston Borough Council election

Elections to Ellesmere Port and Neston Borough Council were held on 4 May 2006. One third of the council was up for election and the Labour Party stayed in overall control of the council. Overall turnout was 33.3%.

After the election, the composition of the council was:

- Labour 26
- Conservative 15
- Liberal Democrat 2

== Results ==
Ellesmere Port and Neston local election result 2006
Party	Seats	Gains	Losses	Net gain/loss	Seats %	Votes %	Votes	+/−
Conservative	7	3	0	+3	46.7	46.6	8,100	
Labour	7	0	3	-3	46.7	36.5	6,348	
Liberal Democrats	1	0	0	0	6.7	11.6	2,012	
BNP	0	0	0	0	0.0	2.3	397	
Independent	0	0	0	0	0.0	2.2	388	
Green	0	0	0	0	0.0	0.7	127	

== Ward results ==
Grange
Party	Candidate	Votes	%	±%
Labour	Diane Roberts	603	60.5	
Conservative	Anne Hughes	228	22.9	
BNP	Paul Molyneux	166	16.6	
Majority		375	37.6	
Turnout		997		
Labour hold		Swing		

Ledsham
Party	Candidate	Votes	%	±%
Conservative	Gareth Anderson	865	53.3	
Labour	George Foster	474	29.2	
Liberal Democrats	Graham Handley	284	17.5	
Majority		391	24.1	
Turnout		1,623		
Conservative hold		Swing		

Neston
Party	Candidate	Votes	%	±%
Labour	Judith Pugh	504	49.5	
Conservative	William Mealor	388	38.1	
Green	Nigel O'Brien	127	12.5	
Majority		116	11.4	
Turnout		1,019		
Labour hold		Swing		

Parkgate
Party	Candidate	Votes	%	±%
Conservative	Nils Anderson	1,106	77.9	
Labour	Louise Gittins	313	22.1	
Majority		793	55.8	
Turnout		1,419		
Conservative hold		Swing		

Pooltown
Party	Candidate	Votes	%	±%
Labour	Peter Robson	346	45.5	
Conservative	Nicholas Hebson	239	31.4	
Liberal Democrats	Marianne Wylie	176	23.1	
Majority		107	14.1	
Turnout		761		
Labour hold		Swing		

Riverside
Party	Candidate	Votes	%	±%
Liberal Democrats	Thomas Marlow	630	50.0	
Conservative	Doreen Grey	384	30.5	
Labour	Robert McGuigan	245	19.5	
Majority		246	19.5	
Turnout		1,259		
Liberal Democrats hold		Swing		

Rossmore
Party	Candidate	Votes	%	±%
Labour	Keith Butcher	702	50.5	
Conservative	Michael English	687	49.5	
Majority		15	1.0	
Turnout		1,389		
Labour hold		Swing		

Stanlow and Wolverham
Party	Candidate	Votes	%	±%
Labour	John Wilson	464	49.5	
Independent	David Garroch	307	32.7	
Conservative	Karl Hardwick	167	17.8	
Majority		157	16.8	
Turnout		938		
Labour hold		Swing		

Strawberry Fields
Party	Candidate	Votes	%	±%
Conservative	Ian Ormerod	408	36.9	
Labour	Abdul Jilani	380	34.3	
Liberal Democrats	Hilary Chrusciezl	319	28.8	
Majority		28	2.6	
Turnout		1,107		
Conservative gain from Labour		Swing		

Sutton
Party	Candidate	Votes	%	±%
Conservative	Kimberley Anderson	613	56.5	
Labour	Tamara Hill	472	43.5	
Majority		141	13.0	
Turnout		1,085		
Conservative gain from Labour		Swing		

Sutton Green and Manor
Party	Candidate	Votes	%	±%
Conservative	Susan Kettle	711	71.4	
Labour	Colin Cooper	285	28.6	
Majority		426	42.8	
Turnout		996		
Conservative hold		Swing		

Westminster (2)
Party	Candidate	Votes	%	±%
Labour	Kenneth Spain	435		
Labour	James Murphy	396		
Liberal Democrats	Sally Martin	123		
Liberal Democrats	Maurice Brookes	120		
BNP	David Joines	118		
BNP	David Southgate	113		
Conservative	Thomas Hughes	101		
Conservative	Terence Harvey	99		
Independent	Peter Dovaston	81		
Turnout		1,586		
Labour hold		Swing		
Labour hold		Swing		

Whitby
Party	Candidate	Votes	%	±%
Conservative	Jeanette Starkey	808	47.1	
Labour	Thomas Callaghan	549	32.0	
Liberal Democrats	Eric Robinson	360	21.0	
Majority		259	15.1	
Turnout		1,717		
Conservative gain from Labour		Swing		

Willaston and Thornton
Party	Candidate	Votes	%	±%
Conservative	Andrew Hogg	1,296	87.8	
Labour	Ian Roscoe	180	12.2	
Majority		1,116	75.6	
Turnout		1,476		
Conservative hold		Swing		
