= 2006 Great Yarmouth Borough Council election =

2006 UK local government election

Map of the results of the 2006 Great Yarmouth council election. Conservatives in blue and Labour in red. Wards in grey were not contested in 2006.

The 2006 Great Yarmouth Borough Council election took place on 4 May 2006 to elect members of Great Yarmouth Borough Council in Norfolk, England. One third of the council was up for election and the Conservative Party stayed in overall control of the council.

After the election, the composition of the council was:

- Conservative 22
- Labour 16
- Others 1

== Election result ==
Overall turnout at the election was 30.74%.

Great Yarmouth local election result 2006
Party	Seats	Gains	Losses	Net gain/loss	Seats %	Votes %	Votes	+/−
Conservative	7	0	3	-3	53.8	51.9	9,163	+0.8%
Labour	6	3	0	+3	46.2	38.0	6,711	-5.5%
Liberal Democrats	0	0	0	0	0	6.2	1,102	+1.9%
National Front	0	0	0	0	0	2.0	345	+1.2%
UKIP	0	0	0	0	0	1.3	238	+1.3%
Green	0	0	0	0	0	0.5	96	+0.5%

== Ward results ==
Bradwell North
Party	Candidate	Votes	%	±%
Conservative	Graham Plant	910	61.6	
Labour	Derrick Sweeting	567	38.4	
Majority		343	23.2	
Turnout		1,477	29.7	−7.3
Conservative hold		Swing		

Bradwell South
Party	Candidate	Votes	%	±%
Conservative	Colin Hodds	1,024	65.8	
Labour	Peter Alexander	532	34.2	
Majority		492	31.6	
Turnout		1,556	30.9	−6.6
Conservative hold		Swing		

Caister North
Party	Candidate	Votes	%	±%
Conservative	Anthony Smith	661	55.0	
Labour	Nicholas Dack	373	31.1	
Liberal Democrats	Nicholas Dyer	167	13.9	
Majority		288	23.9	
Turnout		1,201	32.1	−7.0
Conservative hold		Swing		

Caister South
Party	Candidate	Votes	%	±%
Labour	Patrick Hacon	609	45.9	
Conservative	Theodore Agnew	536	40.4	
Liberal Democrats	Rodney Cole	181	13.7	
Majority		73	5.5	
Turnout		1,326	37.1	−8.2
Labour hold		Swing		

Central and Northgate
Party	Candidate	Votes	%	±%
Labour	Michael Castle	688	43.6	
Conservative	Peter Meah	522	33.1	
Liberal Democrats	Anthony Harris	150	9.5	
UKIP	Gabriele Baugh	122	7.7	
Green	Giles Robins	96	6.1	
Majority		166	10.5	
Turnout		1,578	29.2	−7.0
Labour hold		Swing		

Claydon
Party	Candidate	Votes	%	±%
Labour	Bernard Williamson	822	53.9	
Conservative	Margaret Greenacre	702	46.1	
Majority		120	7.8	
Turnout		1,524	27.9	−5.4
Labour hold		Swing		

East Flegg
Party	Candidate	Votes	%	±%
Conservative	Shirley Weymouth	1,033	74.3	
Labour	Sandra Griffiths	357	25.7	
Majority		676	48.6	
Turnout		1,390	36.8	−5.0
Conservative hold		Swing		

Gorleston
Party	Candidate	Votes	%	±%
Conservative	John Burroughs	706	50.8	
Liberal Democrats	Ivan Lees	469	33.8	
Labour	Jose Bamonde	214	15.4	
Majority		237	17.0	
Turnout		1,389	35.4	−7.5
Conservative hold		Swing		

Lothingland
Party	Candidate	Votes	%	±%
Conservative	Barry Stone	1,014	75.0	
Labour	Christine Williamson	338	25.0	
Majority		676	50.0	
Turnout		1,352	31.0	−11.0
Conservative hold		Swing		

Magdalen
Party	Candidate	Votes	%	±%
Labour	Karen Hewitt	812	51.9	
Conservative	Patricia Page	752	48.1	
Majority		60	3.8	
Turnout		1,564	29.7	−4.6
Labour gain from Conservative		Swing		

Nelson
Party	Candidate	Votes	%	±%
Labour	Valerie Pettit	527	39.6	
Conservative	Joy Cosaitis	459	34.5	
National Front	Thomas Holmes	345	25.9	
Majority		68	5.1	
Turnout		1,331	25.1	−6.0
Labour gain from Conservative		Swing		

Southtown and Cobholm
Party	Candidate	Votes	%	±%
Labour	Sharon Thrasher	330	42.4	
Conservative	Elizabeth Giles	197	25.3	
Liberal Democrats	John Brookshaw	135	17.4	
UKIP	Paul Baugh	116	14.9	
Majority		133	17.1	
Turnout		778	24.4	−4.3
Labour gain from Conservative		Swing		

Yarmouth North
Party	Candidate	Votes	%	±%
Conservative	Robert Peck	647	54.4	
Labour	Marie Field	542	45.6	
Majority		105	8.8	
Turnout		1,189	33.7	−7.6
Conservative hold		Swing		
