= 2006 Newcastle-under-Lyme Borough Council election =

2006 UK local government election

Results of the 2006 Newcastle-under-Lyme Borough Council election

Elections to Newcastle-under-Lyme Borough Council were held on 4 May 2006. One third of the council was up for election and the Labour Party lost overall control of the council to no overall control.

After the election, the composition of the council was:

- Labour 27
- Conservative 17
- Liberal Democrat 14
- UK Independence Party 1
- Independent 1

== Election result ==
Newcastle-under-Lyme local election result 2006
Party	Seats	Gains	Losses	Net gain/loss	Seats %	Votes %	Votes	+/−
Labour	8	0	5	-5	40.0	27.5	7,873	-9.5%
Conservative	6	3	0	+3	30.0	31.6	9,029	+3.9%
Liberal Democrats	6	3	1	+2	30.0	25.2	7,198	-8.1%
UKIP	0	0	0	0	0	14.3	4,088	+14.3%
Green	0	0	0	0	0	1.3	377	+0.7%
Independent	0	0	0	0	0	0.1	33	-0.7%

== Ward results ==
Audley and Bignall End
Party	Candidate	Votes	%	±%
Liberal Democrats	Cornes Dylis	693	36.7	
Labour	Ann Beech	690	36.5	
UKIP	David Nixon	316	16.7	
Conservative	Betty Cartwright	189	10.0	
Majority		3	0.2	
Turnout		1,888		
Liberal Democrats gain from Labour		Swing		

Bradwell
Party	Candidate	Votes	%	±%
Labour	Trevor Hambleton	643	41.3	−15.4
Conservative	Alan Humphreys	325	20.9	−2.6
UKIP	David Parfit	310	19.9	+19.9
Liberal Democrats	David Dugdale	279	17.9	−1.9
Majority		318	20.4	−12.8
Turnout		1,557		
Labour hold		Swing		

Butt Lane
Party	Candidate	Votes	%	±%
Labour	Mavis Lench	405	34.5	−12.9
Liberal Democrats	Sylvia Burgess	404	34.4	+2.7
UKIP	Paul Edwards	206	17.5	+17.5
Conservative	Glenys Davies	160	13.6	−7.2
Majority		1	0.1	−15.6
Turnout		1,175		
Labour hold		Swing		

Chesterton
Party	Candidate	Votes	%	±%
Liberal Democrats	Andrew Cooley	492	34.6	
Labour	Sandra Simpson	441	31.0	
UKIP	Mark Barlow	268	18.8	
Conservative	Jocelyn Budibent	223	15.7	
Majority		51	3.6	
Turnout		1,424		
Liberal Democrats gain from Labour		Swing		

Clayton
Party	Candidate	Votes	%	±%
Conservative	Stephen Sweeney	632	46.3	+2.9
Labour	David Beardmore	352	25.8	−11.8
Liberal Democrats	Michael Shenton	210	15.4	−3.6
UKIP	Brian Dunkley	172	12.6	+12.6
Majority		280	20.5	+14.7
Turnout		1,366		
Conservative gain from Labour		Swing		

Cross Heath
Party	Candidate	Votes	%	±%
Labour	Gillian Williams	627	45.1	−9.2
UKIP	Neville Benson	288	20.7	+20.7
Liberal Democrats	Leo Hamburger	243	17.5	+1.1
Conservative	Tagg John	232	16.7	−3.0
Majority		339	24.4	−10.2
Turnout		1,390		
Labour hold		Swing		

Holditch
Party	Candidate	Votes	%	±%
Labour	William Simpson	401	48.7	−17.1
UKIP	Barbara Lewis	192	23.3	+23.3
Liberal Democrats	Eric Durber	127	15.4	−18.8
Conservative	David Cooper	104	12.6	+12.6
Majority		209	25.4	−6.2
Turnout		824		
Labour hold		Swing		

Keele
Party	Candidate	Votes	%	±%
Liberal Democrats	Robin Studd	279	35.9	−31.1
Green	Andrew Dobson	236	30.3	+30.3
Conservative	Joel Foley	193	24.8	+10.3
Labour	Stephen James	60	7.7	−10.9
UKIP	Sajid Mahmood	10	1.3	+1.3
Majority		43	5.6	−42.8
Turnout		778		
Liberal Democrats hold		Swing		

Kidsgrove
Party	Candidate	Votes	%	±%
Liberal Democrats	Mary Maxfield	809	49.5	+28.5
Labour	Paul Waring	472	28.9	−33.3
UKIP	Geoffrey Locke	188	11.5	+11.5
Conservative	Edward Lowe	166	10.2	−6.7
Majority		337	20.6	
Turnout		1,635		
Liberal Democrats hold		Swing		

Knutton and Silverdale
Party	Candidate	Votes	%	±%
Labour	Richard Gorton	380	40.1	−14.3
UKIP	Derrick Huckfield	331	34.9	+34.9
Conservative	Nicola Gregory	117	12.3	+11.4
Liberal Democrats	Betty Kinnersley	87	9.2	+4.4
Independent	Michael Nicklin	33	3.5	+1.3
Majority		49	5.2	−11.6
Turnout		948		
Labour hold		Swing		

Loggerheads and Whitmore
Party	Candidate	Votes	%	±%
Conservative	Philip Maskery	1,640	74.1	+3.4
Liberal Democrats	Anne Becket	235	10.6	−8.1
UKIP	Trevor Colclough	171	7.7	+7.7
Labour	Glyn Williams	166	7.5	−3.1
Majority		1,405	63.5	+11.5
Turnout		2,212		
Conservative hold		Swing		

Madeley
Party	Candidate	Votes	%	±%
Labour	Robert Howells	433	33.8	−10.1
Conservative	Richard Lowe	404	31.6	+10.2
Liberal Democrats	Bryan Kirkham	358	28.0	−6.7
UKIP	Joseph Bonfiglio	85	6.6	+6.6
Majority		29	2.2	−7.0
Turnout		1,280		
Labour hold		Swing		

May Bank
Party	Candidate	Votes	%	±%
Conservative	Stephen Holland	1,126	56.7	+8.3
Liberal Democrats	Donald Maciver	371	18.7	−10.8
Labour	Jacqueline Olszewski	326	16.4	−5.7
UKIP	Michael Beckett	163	8.2	+8.2
Majority		755	38.0	+19.1
Turnout		1,986		
Conservative gain from Liberal Democrats		Swing		

Porthill
Party	Candidate	Votes	%	±%
Conservative	Julie Cooper	570	47.6	+5.7
Labour	Bertram Lawton	343	28.7	−11.5
Liberal Democrats	Emma Cooley	149	12.4	−5.4
UKIP	Yvonne Heath	135	11.3	+11.3
Majority		227	18.9	+17.2
Turnout		1,197		
Conservative gain from Labour		Swing		

Seabridge
Party	Candidate	Votes	%	±%
Conservative	Andrew Fear	738	43.8	−2.7
Labour	Rex Harper	408	24.2	−11.2
UKIP	Paul Gregory	278	16.5	+16.5
Liberal Democrats	Carol Reddish	260	15.4	−2.7
Majority		330	19.6	+8.5
Turnout		1,684		
Conservative hold		Swing		

Silverdale and Parksite
Party	Candidate	Votes	%	±%
Labour	Elaine Blake	389	41.9	+2.6
UKIP	Andrea Liversage	296	31.9	+31.9
Conservative	Alexander Hayward	125	13.5	+4.0
Liberal Democrats	Richard O'Callaghan	119	12.8	+2.3
Majority		93	10.0	
Turnout		929		
Labour hold		Swing		

Thistleberry
Party	Candidate	Votes	%	±%
Liberal Democrats	June Walklate	934	53.9	−1.8
Conservative	Gerald Cork	384	22.1	−1.6
Labour	Doris Boden	248	14.3	−1.2
UKIP	Dominic Arnold	168	9.7	+9.7
Majority		950	31.8	−0.2
Turnout		1,734		
Liberal Democrats hold		Swing		

Town
Party	Candidate	Votes	%	±%
Liberal Democrats	Elizabeth Shenton	586	49.0	+0.7
Labour	Albert Clarke	365	30.5	−2.7
Conservative	Luciana Flackett	136	11.4	−1.5
UKIP	Glyn Jones	108	9.0	+9.0
Majority		221	18.5	+3.4
Turnout		1,195		
Liberal Democrats gain from Labour		Swing		

Westlands
Party	Candidate	Votes	%	±%
Conservative	Glennis Deakin	1,143	60.3	+4.8
Liberal Democrats	Hilary Jones	341	18.0	−8.4
Labour	Eileen Robinson	246	13.0	−5.1
UKIP	Pamela Jackson	166	8.8	+8.8
Majority		802	42.3	+13.2
Turnout		1,896		
Conservative hold		Swing		

Wolstanton
Party	Candidate	Votes	%	±%
Labour	Michael Foy	478	31.9	−6.7
Conservative	Stephen Morris	422	28.1	+8.9
UKIP	David Woolley	237	15.8	+15.8
Liberal Democrats	Christopher Dunning	222	14.8	−15.3
Green	Ann Beirne	141	9.4	−2.8
Majority		56	3.8	−4.7
Turnout		1,500		
Labour hold		Swing		
