= 2006 West Lindsey District Council election =

2006 UK local government election

Elections to West Lindsey District Council were held on 4 May 2006. One third of the council was up for election and the Conservative Party lost overall control of the council to no overall control. The Liberal Democrat party took overall control of the council two weeks later after a by-election victory in Lea ward.

After the election, the composition of the council was:

- Liberal Democrat 18
- Conservative 17
- Independent 2

== Election result ==
West Lindsey local election result 2006
Party	Seats	Gains	Losses	Net gain/loss	Seats %	Votes %	Votes	+/−
Liberal Democrats	6	2	0	+2	50.0	47.1	5,763	-6.6%
Conservative	6	0	2	-2	50.0	46.3	5,667	+10.6%
UKIP	0	0	0	0	0	4.3	528	+4.3%
Labour	0	0	0	0	0	1.5	185	-4.1%
Independent	0	0	0	0	0	0.8	99	-4.1%

== Ward results ==
Bardney
Party	Candidate	Votes	%	±%
Conservative	Ian Fleetwood	483	67.5	−4.9
Liberal Democrats	Heather Shore	137	19.1	−8.5
UKIP	Carol Pearson	96	13.4	+13.4
Majority		346	48.4	+3.6
Turnout		716	46.5	−0.3
Conservative hold		Swing		

Cherry Willingham
Party	Candidate	Votes	%	±%
Conservative	Irmgard Parrott	1,074	79.9	+45.0
UKIP	Steven Pearson	270	20.1	+20.1
Majority		804	59.8	
Turnout		1,344	39.5	−17.0
Conservative hold		Swing		

Fiskerton
Party	Candidate	Votes	%	±%
Conservative	Margaret Davidson	414	60.8	+10.9
Liberal Democrats	Penelope Smith	202	29.7	+3.3
UKIP	Anthony Pearson	65	9.5	+9.7
Majority		212	31.1	+7.6
Turnout		681	40.8	+7.1
Conservative hold		Swing		

Gainsborough East
Party	Candidate	Votes	%	±%
Liberal Democrats	Melvyn Starkey	760	67.0	+18.7
Conservative	Jessie Milne	375	33.0	+15.8
Majority		385	34.0	+20.1
Turnout		1,135	23.7	−11.6
Liberal Democrats hold		Swing		

Gainsborough North
Party	Candidate	Votes	%	±%
Liberal Democrats	Thomas Brown	812	67.1	+29.4
Conservative	Karen Foreman	302	24.9	+0.8
UKIP	Gordon Simmonds	97	8.0	+8.0
Majority		510	42.2	+28.6
Turnout		1,211	24.4	−16.7
Liberal Democrats hold		Swing		

Hemswell
Party	Candidate	Votes	%	±%
Liberal Democrats	Scott Pritchard	477	56.3	+17.7
Conservative	Colin Wotherspoon	370	43.7	−17.7
Majority		107	12.6	
Turnout		847	45.3	+9.6
Liberal Democrats gain from Conservative		Swing		

Market Rasen
Party	Candidate	Votes	%	±%
Conservative	Adam Duguid	744	52.7	+7.2
Liberal Democrats	Kenneth Bridger	668	47.3	−7.2
Majority		76	5.4	
Turnout		1,412	36.2	+0.5
Conservative hold		Swing		

Nettleham
Party	Candidate	Votes	%	±%
Liberal Democrats	Alfred Frith	1,005	61.1	−3.6
Conservative	Susan Harland	510	31.0	−4.3
Labour	Brian Pocknee	130	7.9	+7.9
Majority		495	30.1	+0.7
Turnout		1,645	46.0	−9.4
Liberal Democrats hold		Swing		

Scampton
Party	Candidate	Votes	%	±%
Liberal Democrats	Peter Heath	527	58.5	−16.7
Conservative	David Howe	374	41.5	+16.7
Majority		153	17.0	−33.4
Turnout		901	40.2	+2.2
Liberal Democrats hold		Swing		

Thonock
Party	Candidate	Votes	%	±%
Liberal Democrats	Lesley Rollings	552	68.1	+40.7
Conservative	Donald Sweeting	258	31.9	−11.6
Majority		294	36.2	+21.8
Turnout		810	39.1	+5.9
Liberal Democrats gain from Conservative		Swing		

Waddingham & Spital
Party	Candidate	Votes	%	±%
Conservative	Jeffrey Summers	421	51.2	+2.9
Liberal Democrats	Michael Burton-Stepan	302	36.7	+11.6
Independent	Ernest Coleman	99	12.0	−14.6
Majority		119	14.5	−7.2
Turnout		822	43.6	−2.6
Conservative hold		Swing		

Wold View
Party	Candidate	Votes	%	±%
Conservative	Bernard Theobald	342	47.6	−8.5
Liberal Democrats	John Connolly	321	44.7	+44.7
Labour	John Indian	55	7.7	−36.2
Majority		21	2.9	−25.0
Turnout		718	38.9	+11.0
Conservative hold		Swing		
