= 2006 Swale Borough Council election =

2006 UK local government election

Map of the results of the 2006 Swale Borough Council election. Conservatives in blue, Labour in red and Liberal Democrats in yellow. Wards in dark grey were not contested in 2006.

The 2006 Swale Borough Council election took place on 4 May 2006 to elect members of Swale Borough Council in Kent, England. One third of the council was up for election and the Conservative Party stayed in overall control of the council.

After the election, the composition of the council was:

- Conservative 28
- Labour 10
- Liberal Democrats 8
- Kent Campaign Against Increasing Council Tax 1

== Election result ==
The Conservatives gained three seats after winning 11 of the 16 seats contested. They took two seats from the Liberal Democrats in Grove and Minster Cliffs wards, while also defeating a Labour councillor in Queenborough and Halfway by 17 votes. This took the Conservatives to 28 seats on the council, compared to 10 for Labour and 8 for the Liberal Democrats.

The Kent Campaign Against Increasing Council Tax failed to win any seats after standing in 9 of the 16 wards contested, coming closest in Sheppey Central where they finished second with 540 votes, compared to 636 for the Conservative councillor John Morris. This meant the former Conservative councillor Chris Boden remained the only councillor for the Kent Campaign Against Increasing Council Tax after the election.

Swale local election result 2006
Party	Seats	Gains	Losses	Net gain/loss	Seats %	Votes %	Votes	+/−
Conservative	11	3	0	+3	68.8	45.1	10,370	-1.3%
Labour	4	0	1	-1	25.0	27.6	6,353	-1.8%
Liberal Democrats	1	0	2	-2	6.3	20.0	4,599	-1.4%
Kent Campaign Against Increasing Council Taxes	0	0	0	0	0	7.2	1,655	+7.2%
Money Reform	0	0	0	0	0	0.1	29	+0.1%

== Ward results ==
Abbey
Party	Candidate	Votes	%	±%
Conservative	Bryan Mulhern	587	44.4	−8.6
Labour	Trevor Payne	410	31.0	−16.0
Liberal Democrats	Martin Bellis	223	16.9	+16.9
Kent Campaign Against Increasing Council Taxes	Charles Ulyatt	73	5.5	+5.5
Money Reform	Anne Belsey	29	2.2	+2.2
Majority		177	13.4	−24.8
Turnout		1,322	36.4	−1.8
Conservative hold		Swing		

Chalkwell
Party	Candidate	Votes	%	±%
Labour	Roger Truelove	620	47.9	+0.3
Conservative	Derek Carnell	379	29.3	−3.7
Liberal Democrats	David Spurling	185	14.3	−5.1
Kent Campaign Against Increasing Council Taxes	Christopher Evans	110	8.5	+8.5
Majority		241	18.6	+4.0
Turnout		1,294	35.9	+2.0
Labour hold		Swing		

Grove
Party	Candidate	Votes	%	±%
Conservative	Gareth Randall	591	39.5	+8.6
Liberal Democrats	Bernard Lowe	515	34.4	−18.1
Labour	Michael Baldock	285	19.1	+2.5
Kent Campaign Against Increasing Council Taxes	Jennifer Bishop	105	7.0	+7.0
Majority		76	5.1	
Turnout		1,496	34.0	+8.6
Conservative gain from Liberal Democrats		Swing		

Hartlip, Newington and Upchurch
Party	Candidate	Votes	%	±%
Conservative	Gerald Lewin	1,170	70.2	+4.7
Labour	Anthony Winckless	252	15.1	−1.3
Liberal Democrats	William Daw	245	14.7	−3.3
Majority		918	55.1	+7.6
Turnout		1,667	39.0	+4.0
Conservative hold		Swing		

Kemsley
Party	Candidate	Votes	%	±%
Conservative	Brenda Simpson	722	61.7	+11.7
Labour	Russell Beardmore	268	22.9	+5.6
Liberal Democrats	Sandra Sims	180	15.4	+4.7
Majority		454	38.8	+10.6
Turnout		1,170	28.3	+0.8
Conservative hold		Swing		

Minster Cliffs
Party	Candidate	Votes	%	±%
Conservative	Kenneth Pugh	750	40.7	+3.5
Liberal Democrats	Nicholas Williams	466	25.3	−14.1
Labour	Matthew Wheatcroft	449	24.3	+6.4
Kent Campaign Against Increasing Council Taxes	William Stone	180	9.8	+9.8
Majority		284	15.4	
Turnout		1,845	34.3	−1.0
Conservative gain from Liberal Democrats		Swing		

Murston
Party	Candidate	Votes	%	±%
Liberal Democrats	Manuella Tomes	450	47.3	−12.4
Labour	Shelley Cheesman	293	30.8	+11.7
Conservative	Nailesh Patel	208	21.9	+0.7
Majority		157	16.5	−22.0
Turnout		951	27.0	−1.6
Liberal Democrats hold		Swing		

Queenborough and Halfway
Party	Candidate	Votes	%	±%
Conservative	David Garside	830	43.8	+4.3
Labour	Michael Constable	813	42.9	+1.0
Liberal Democrats	Geoffrey Partis	250	13.2	+4.4
Majority		17	0.9	
Turnout		1,893	36.0	+0.3
Conservative gain from Labour		Swing		

Roman
Party	Candidate	Votes	%	±%
Labour	Simon Clark	586	47.9	−6.6
Conservative	Martin Clarke	417	34.1	+8.8
Liberal Democrats	Peter Springham	220	18.0	−3.3
Majority		169	13.8	−16.4
Turnout		1,223	34.8	−1.9
Labour hold		Swing		

Sheerness East
Party	Candidate	Votes	%	±%
Labour	Mark Ellen	329	36.8	−6.2
Conservative	June Kimber	282	31.5	−2.9
Liberal Democrats	Colin Howe	188	21.0	−1.6
Kent Campaign Against Increasing Council Taxes	Patricia Sandle	96	10.7	+10.7
Majority		47	5.3	−3.3
Turnout		895	27.3	+6.4
Labour hold		Swing		

Sheerness West
Party	Candidate	Votes	%	±%
Labour	Angela Harrison	643	59.1	−4.2
Conservative	Jane Morris	269	24.7	+6.3
Liberal Democrats	David Kemp	176	16.2	+6.5
Majority		374	34.4	−10.5
Turnout		1,088	28.8	+6.9
Labour hold		Swing		

Sheppey Central
Party	Candidate	Votes	%	±%
Conservative	John Morris	636	37.7	−8.7
Kent Campaign Against Increasing Council Taxes	Lesley Ingham	540	32.0	+32.0
Labour	Robert Stanbridge	335	19.8	−15.5
Liberal Democrats	Christine Martin	177	10.5	−7.8
Majority		96	5.7	−5.4
Turnout		1,688	31.0	−1.0
Conservative hold		Swing		

St Ann's
Party	Candidate	Votes	%	±%
Conservative	Michael Cosgrove	685	50.3	−4.7
Liberal Democrats	David Evans	313	23.0	+1.4
Labour	Paul Durkin	258	18.9	−4.4
Kent Campaign Against Increasing Council Taxes	Joseph Brown	107	7.9	+7.9
Majority		372	27.3	−4.4
Turnout		1,363	35.6	−5.9
Conservative hold		Swing		

Teynham and Lynsted
Party	Candidate	Votes	%	±%
Conservative	John Disney	802	56.6	+7.9
Kent Campaign Against Increasing Council Taxes	Richard Shannon	346	24.4	+24.4
Labour	Kenneth Rowles	269	19.0	−17.0
Majority		456	32.2	+19.3
Turnout		1,417	36.7	+5.0
Conservative hold		Swing		

Watling
Party	Candidate	Votes	%	±%
Conservative	Cynthia Davis	1,091	66.7	−5.3
Liberal Democrats	Michael Henderson	301	18.4	+18.4
Labour	Lionel Vaughan	244	14.9	−13.1
Majority		790	48.3	+4.3
Turnout		1,636	43.0	−2.1
Conservative hold		Swing		

Woodstock
Party	Candidate	Votes	%	±%
Conservative	Alan Willicombe	951	46.2	−1.7
Liberal Democrats	Berick Tomes	710	34.5	−8.2
Labour	Adam Tolhurst	299	14.5	+5.1
Kent Campaign Against Increasing Council Taxes	Kenneth Boyce	98	4.8	+4.8
Majority		241	11.7	+6.6
Turnout		2,058	51.7	+8.4
Conservative hold		Swing		
