= 2006 Rochford District Council election =

2006 UK local government election

Results of the 2006 Rochford District Council election

Elections to Rochford Council were held on 4 May 2006. One third of the council was up for election and the Conservative party stayed in overall control of the council.

After the election, the composition of the council was:

Party	Seats	±
Conservative	34	+2
Liberal Democrat	4	0
Rochford District Residents	1	0
Labour	0	-1
Independent	0	-1

== Election result ==
Rochford local election result 2006
Party	Seats	Gains	Losses	Net gain/loss	Seats %	Votes %	Votes	+/−
Conservative	10	2	0	+2	76.9	55.3	9,031	-7.0%
Liberal Democrats	2	0	0	0	15.4	17.8	2,909	+9.1%
Rochford Residents	1	0	0	0	7.7	6.1	992	+6.1%
Labour	0	0	1	-1	0	15.8	2,589	-2.8%
Green	0	0	0	0	0	5.0	817	-5.4%
Independent	0	0	1	-1	0	0	0	+0.0%

== Ward results ==
=== Downhall & Rawreth ===
Downhall & Rawreth
Party	Candidate	Votes	%	±%
Liberal Democrats	Christopher Black	900	73.3	−1.4
Conservative	Victor Howlett	328	26.7	+1.4
Majority		572	46.6	−2.8
Turnout		1,228	37.6	+11.4
Liberal Democrats hold		Swing		

=== Foulness and Great Wakering ===
Foulness and Great Wakering
Party	Candidate	Votes	%	±%
Conservative	Trevor Goodwin	851	59.0	−0.1
Labour	Graham Fox	393	27.3	−13.6
Green	Gillian Askew	198	13.7	+13.7
Majority		458	31.7	+13.5
Turnout		1,442	32.7	−3.0
Conservative hold		Swing		

=== Grange ===
Grange
Party	Candidate	Votes	%	±%
Liberal Democrats	Christopher Lumley	683	66.3	+10.6
Conservative	Roland Adams	347	33.7	−10.6
Majority		336	32.6	+21.2
Turnout		1,030	37.4	+8.6
Liberal Democrats hold		Swing		

=== Hawkwell North ===
Hawkwell North
Party	Candidate	Votes	%	±%
Conservative	Michael Starke	596	51.6	+0.0
Rochford Residents	Christine Mason	438	37.9	+15.1
Labour	Sheila Downard	121	10.5	−1.0
Majority		158	13.7	−15.1
Turnout		1,155	33.7	+7.7
Conservative hold		Swing		

=== Hawkwell South ===
Hawkwell South
Party	Candidate	Votes	%	±%
Conservative	Heather Glynn	701	77.8	+33.2
Labour	David Thompson	200	22.2	+5.5
Majority		501	55.6	+49.7
Turnout		901	28.2	+5.9
Conservative gain from Independent		Swing		

=== Hawkwell West ===
Hawkwell West
Party	Candidate	Votes	%	±%
Rochford Residents	John Mason	554	44.7	+44.7
Conservative	Malcolm Houghton	422	34.0	−9.4
Labour	Myra Weir	264	21.3	−18.4
Majority		132	10.7	
Turnout		1,240	39.5	+11.7
Rochford Residents hold		Swing		

=== Hockley Central ===
Hockley Central
Party	Candidate	Votes	%	±%
Conservative	Carole Weston	1,181	68.5	
Labour	Dorothy Thompson	313	18.2	
Green	Gabrielle Yeadell	230	13.3	
Majority		868	50.3	
Turnout		1,724	34.1	−4.0
Conservative hold		Swing		

=== HullBridge ===
Hullbridge
Party	Candidate	Votes	%	±%
Conservative	Rosemary Brown	977	58.5	+5.0
Labour	Angelina Marriott	381	22.8	−3.9
Green	Robin Hume	313	18.7	−1.1
Majority		596	35.7	+8.9
Turnout		1,671	31.5	−5.3
Conservative hold		Swing		

=== Rayleigh Central ===
Rayleigh Central
Party	Candidate	Votes	%	±%
Conservative	Patricia Aves	654	61.0	
Liberal Democrats	Patricia Putt	283	26.4	
Labour	Christopher Morgan	135	12.6	
Majority		371	34.6	
Turnout		1,072	32.7	
Conservative hold		Swing		

=== Rochford ===
Rochford
Party	Candidate	Votes	%	±%
Conservative	James Cottis	877	52.9	−7.6
Labour	Maureen Vince	782	47.1	+7.6
Majority		95	5.8	−15.2
Turnout		1,659	32.0	+1.0
Conservative gain from Labour		Swing		

=== Trinity ===
Trinity
Party	Candidate	Votes	%	±%
Conservative	James Grey	618	61.6	+2.2
Liberal Democrats	Keith Budden	310	30.9	−9.7
Green	Neil Kirsh	76	7.6	+7.6
Majority		308	30.7	+11.9
Turnout		1,004	34.8	−8.8
Conservative hold		Swing		

=== Wheatley ===
Wheatley
Party	Candidate	Votes	%	±%
Conservative	Mavis Webster	768	70.5	+2.0
Liberal Democrats	Mark Pearson	322	29.5	−2.0
Majority		446	41.0	+4.0
Turnout		1,090	34.4	−3.7
Conservative hold		Swing		

=== Whitehouse ===
Whitehouse
Party	Candidate	Votes	%	±%
Conservative	Peter Webster	711	63.4	+0.7
Liberal Democrats	Jacqueline Dillnutt	411	36.6	−0.7
Majority		300	26.8	+1.4
Turnout		1,122	37.1	−1.7
Conservative hold		Swing		
