= 2006 Amber Valley Borough Council election =

2006 UK local government election

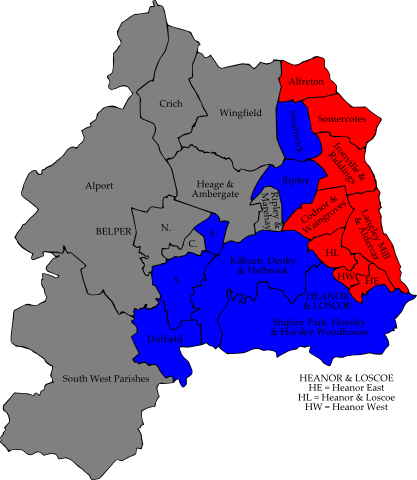
Map of the results of the 2006 Amber Valley council election. Labour in red and Conservatives in blue. Wards in grey were not contested in 2006.

Elections to Amber Valley Borough Council were held on 4 May 2006. One third of the council was up for election and the Conservative Party held overall control of the council. Overall turnout was 34%.

After the election, the composition of the council was:

- Conservative 27
- Labour 18

== Election result ==
Amber Valley local election result 2006
Party	Seats	Gains	Losses	Net gain/loss	Seats %	Votes %	Votes	+/−
Labour	8	0	3	-3	53.3	39.4	9,361	-3.6%
Conservative	7	3	0	+3	46.7	43.2	10,259	0.0%
Liberal	0	0	0	0	0	11.6	2,758	+1.8%
BNP	0	0	0	0	0	4.7	1,116	+2.0%
Green	0	0	0	0	0	1.1	252	+1.1%

== Ward results ==
Alfreton
Party	Candidate	Votes	%	±%
Labour	John Walker	1,044	55.8	+8.5
Conservative	David Wilson	564	30.1	+1.0
Liberal Democrats	Paul Gibbons	264	14.1	−9.5
Majority		480	25.7	+7.5
Turnout		1,872	30	−11
Labour hold		Swing		

Belper East
Party	Candidate	Votes	%	±%
Conservative	Martin Tomlinson	699	50.9	+1.8
Labour	Randall Sanders	395	28.8	−7.7
Liberal Democrats	Hassan Dervish	278	20.3	+5.9
Majority		304	22.1	+9.5
Turnout		1,372	31	
Conservative hold		Swing		

Belper South
Party	Candidate	Votes	%	±%
Conservative	James Anderson	529	43.3	−13.0
Labour	Peter Shepherd	398	32.5	−11.2
Green	Colin Grimley	163	13.3	+13.3
Liberal Democrats	Timothy Clark	133	10.9	+10.9
Majority		131	10.8	−1.8
Turnout		1,223	32	
Conservative hold		Swing		

Codnor & Waingroves
Party	Candidate	Votes	%	±%
Labour	Ian Fisher	676	52.7	−5.9
Conservative	Roy Wildsmith	424	33.0	−8.4
Liberal Democrats	Colin Murfin	183	14.3	+14.3
Majority		252	19.7	+2.5
Turnout		1,283	33	−12
Labour hold		Swing		

Duffield
Party	Candidate	Votes	%	±%
Conservative	Chris Short	982	64.9	+7.6
Liberal Democrats	Colin Thompson	238	15.7	−5.6
Labour	Diana Hancock	203	13.4	−8.0
Green	Karen How	89	5.9	+5.9
Majority		744	49.2	+13.3
Turnout		1,512	43	−6
Conservative hold		Swing		

Heanor & Loscoe
Party	Candidate	Votes	%	±%
Labour	John Moon	731	43.4	−10.5
BNP	Paul Snell	524	31.1	+31.1
Conservative	Jean Parry	327	19.4	−26.7
Liberal Democrats	Sally Mcintosh	103	6.1	+6.1
Majority		207	12.3	+4.5
Turnout		1,685	41	−1
Labour hold		Swing		

Heanor East
Party	Candidate	Votes	%	±%
Labour	Glynne Cato	567	44.4	−20.5
Conservative	Linda Edwards-Milsom	468	36.6	+1.5
Liberal Democrats	Gavin Sarkas-Bosman	242	19.0	+19.0
Majority		99	7.8	−22.0
Turnout		1,277	29	−12
Labour hold		Swing		

Heanor West
Party	Candidate	Votes	%	±%
Labour	Paul Jones	607	32.0	−2.7
BNP	Brian Edwards	592	31.2	+5.0
Liberal Democrats	Judith Woolley	427	22.5	+6.2
Conservative	Jade Wiltshire	273	14.4	−8.5
Majority		15	0.8	−7.7
Turnout		1,899	42	−3
Labour hold		Swing		

Ironville & Riddings
Party	Candidate	Votes	%	±%
Labour	Paul Smith	700	45.0	+0.8
Conservative	Patricia Bomar	660	42.5	−13.3
Liberal Democrats	Gordon Monaghan	194	12.5	+12.5
Majority		40	2.5	
Turnout		1,554	34	−8
Labour hold		Swing		

Kilburn, Denby & Holbrook
Party	Candidate	Votes	%	±%
Conservative	Jean Gemmell	1,396	63.3	+16.0
Labour	John Grace	811	36.7	+3.2
Majority		585	26.6	+12.8
Turnout		2,207	36	−11
Conservative gain from Labour		Swing		

Langley Mill & Aldercar
Party	Candidate	Votes	%	±%
Labour	Stephanie Ward	472	48.7	−5.8
Conservative	Terence Thorpe	343	35.4	+16.9
Liberal Democrats	Keith Falconbridge	154	15.9	+6.9
Majority		129	13.3	−22.7
Turnout		969	25	−15
Labour hold		Swing		

Ripley
Party	Candidate	Votes	%	±%
Conservative	Elizabeth Bowley	1,042	48.3	−0.8
Labour	Charles Cutting	794	36.8	+4.9
Liberal Democrats	Catharine Smith	322	14.9	−4.1
Majority		248	11.5	−5.7
Turnout		2,158	32	−9
Conservative gain from Labour		Swing		

Shipley Park, Horsley & Horsley Woodhouse
Party	Candidate	Votes	%	±%
Conservative	Kevin Parkinson	1,115	58.5	0.0
Labour	Eric Lancashire	790	41.5	0.0
Majority		325	17.0	0.0
Turnout		1,905	42	−8
Conservative gain from Labour		Swing		

Somercotes
Party	Candidate	Votes	%	±%
Labour	Brian Lyttle	784	63.3	+8.1
Conservative	Sally West	454	36.7	+9.5
Majority		330	26.6	−1.4
Turnout		1,238	28	−10
Labour hold		Swing		

Swanwick
Party	Candidate	Votes	%	±%
Conservative	Allen King	983	61.7	+5.8
Labour	Michael Missett	389	24.4	−7.0
Liberal Democrats	Paulette Robinson	220	13.8	+13.8
Majority		594	37.3	+12.8
Turnout		1,592	37	
Conservative hold		Swing		
