= 2006 Milton Keynes Council election =

2006 UK local government election

Map of the results of the 2006 Milton Keynes council election. Conservatives in blue, Liberal Democrats in orange and Labour in red. Wards in white were not contested in 2006.

The 2006 Milton Keynes Council election took place on 4 May 2006 to elect members of Milton Keynes Unitary Council in Buckinghamshire, England. One third of the council was up for election and the Liberal Democrats lost overall control of the council to no overall control.

After the election, the composition of the council was:

- Liberal Democrat 23
- Labour 15
- Conservative 13

== Election result ==
The results saw the Liberal Democrats drop 4 seats to lose their majority on the council, while the Conservatives made gains.

Milton Keynes local election result 2006
Party	Seats	Gains	Losses	Net gain/loss	Seats %	Votes %	Votes	+/−
Conservative	7	6	0	+6	41.2	35.5	16,897	+6.8%
Liberal Democrats	6	0	4	-4	35.3	30.0	14,293	+5.4%
Labour	4	0	1	-1	23.5	22.7	10,827	-3.8%
Independent	0	0	1	-1	0	3.7	1,769	+0.4%
Green	0	0	0	0	0	2.9	1,372	-0.3%
UKIP	0	0	0	0	0	2.6	1,228	-11.1%
Better MK Independent	0	0	0	0	0	2.5	1,177	+2.5%
CPA	0	0	0	0	0	0.2	85	+0.2%

== Ward results ==
Bletchley and Fenny Stratford
Party	Candidate	Votes	%	±%
Conservative	Alison Latham	1,387	36.6	+8.2
Labour	Grant Gillingham	1,260	33.2	−3.0
Independent	Danny Galvin	777	20.5	+5.9
Liberal Democrats	Vanessa McPake	368	9.7	+0.6
Majority		127	3.4	
Turnout		3,792	43.8	−1.5
Conservative gain from Labour		Swing		

Bradwell
Party	Candidate	Votes	%	±%
Liberal Democrats	Sandra Clark	1,139	38.5	+3.6
Labour	Alan Williams	735	24.9	−0.6
Conservative	Jeff Townsend	614	20.8	+3.3
Green	Arnold Bailson	214	7.2	+0.2
UKIP	Patrick France	165	5.6	−9.6
Better MK Independent	Quincy John	88	3.0	+3.0
Majority		404	13.7	+4.3
Turnout		2,955	32.8	−2.6
Liberal Democrats hold		Swing		

Campbell Park
Party	Candidate	Votes	%	±%
Liberal Democrats	Isabel McCall	1,032	38.5	+1.6
Labour	Martin Petchey	826	30.8	+4.2
Conservative	Thomas Fraser	575	21.4	+5.6
Green	Katrina Deacon	248	9.3	+2.6
Majority		206	7.7	−2.5
Turnout		2,681	26.4	−2.1
Liberal Democrats hold		Swing		

Denbigh
Party	Candidate	Votes	%	±%
Labour	Roger Bristow	745	40.5	−1.0
Conservative	John Bailey	661	35.9	+6.3
Liberal Democrats	Carol Vella	247	13.4	+4.3
UKIP	Christopher Tett	188	10.2	−9.5
Majority		84	4.6	−7.3
Turnout		1,841	30.9	−3.9
Labour hold		Swing		

Eaton Manor
Party	Candidate	Votes	%	±%
Labour	Reginald Edwards	903	52.7	+5.9
Conservative	Uroy Clarke	463	27.0	+2.5
UKIP	Arnold Leeming	180	10.5	−8.5
Liberal Democrats	Alfred Vella	167	9.7	+0.0
Majority		440	25.7	+3.5
Turnout		1,713	30.5	−3.1
Labour hold		Swing		

Emerson Valley
Party	Candidate	Votes	%	±%
Liberal Democrats	Stuart Burke	1,384	46.0	+7.2
Conservative	Gerald Small	1,169	38.8	+8.9
Labour	Elaine Wales	457	15.2	−3.5
Majority		215	7.1	−1.9
Turnout		3,010	30.2	−1.8
Liberal Democrats hold		Swing		

Furzton
Party	Candidate	Votes	%	±%
Liberal Democrats	Jennifer Ferrans	865	42.1	−8.3
Conservative	Alexander Swanson	702	34.1	+6.9
Labour	Lisa Rodriguez	350	17.0	−5.3
Better MK Independent	Lewpen Kinross-Skeels	140	6.8	+6.8
Majority		163	7.9	−15.3
Turnout		2,057	32.6	+4.9
Liberal Democrats hold		Swing		

Linford North
Party	Candidate	Votes	%	±%
Conservative	David Tunney	1,018	39.7	+14.5
Liberal Democrats	Robert Benning	926	36.1	−7.2
Labour	George Byfield	359	14.0	−8.1
Green	Peter Edwards	263	10.2	+4.7
Majority		92	3.6	
Turnout		2,566	39.9	+8.8
Conservative gain from Liberal Democrats		Swing		

Linford South
Party	Candidate	Votes	%	±%
Conservative	Catriona Morris	906	38.7	+16.6
Liberal Democrats	John Monk	810	34.6	−10.6
Labour	John McLinton	385	16.5	−4.5
Green	Caroline Lancaster	239	10.2	+2.3
Majority		96	4.1	
Turnout		2,340	37.3	+12.0
Conservative gain from Liberal Democrats		Swing		

Loughton Park
Party	Candidate	Votes	%	±%
Conservative	Andrew Dransfield	1,348	42.3	+4.7
Labour	Colin Lund	674	21.1	−2.3
Better MK Independent	Neil Cawley	638	20.0	+8.9
Liberal Democrats	John Napper	530	16.6	+2.5
Majority		674	21.1	+6.9
Turnout		3,190	31.1	−2.7
Conservative hold		Swing		

Newport Pagnell North
Party	Candidate	Votes	%	±%
Liberal Democrats	Euan Henderson	1,052	48.5	+6.7
Conservative	Laura Kenyon	762	35.2	+7.2
Labour	Brian Barton	193	8.9	−0.3
UKIP	Michael Phillips	160	7.4	−9.8
Majority		290	13.4	−0.4
Turnout		2,167	37.9	+0.4
Liberal Democrats hold		Swing		

Newport Pagnell South
Party	Candidate	Votes	%	±%
Liberal Democrats	Irene Henderson	1,139	53.4	+10.6
Conservative	Anthony Kenyon	675	31.6	+5.1
Labour	Claudia Beckley-Lines	202	9.5	−1.5
UKIP	Alison Phillips	117	5.5	−8.9
Majority		464	21.8	+5.5
Turnout		2,133	38.0	−0.5
Liberal Democrats hold		Swing		

Olney
Party	Candidate	Votes	%	±%
Conservative	Debbie Brock	1,856	51.9	+13.3
Liberal Democrats	Graham Mabbutt	1,589	44.4	+2.9
Labour	Paul Ashby	132	3.7	−4.6
Majority		267	7.5	
Turnout		3,577	56.1	+4.6
Conservative gain from Liberal Democrats		Swing		

Stony Stratford
Party	Candidate	Votes	%	±%
Conservative	Philip Wharton	1,480	38.9	−2.4
Independent	Paul Bartlett	992	26.1	+26.1
Labour	Lynne White	837	22.0	−7.6
Liberal Democrats	Sacha Dhamani	281	7.4	−7.0
UKIP	Adrian Haynes	216	5.7	−9.3
Majority		488	12.8	+1.1
Turnout		3,806	42.3	+1.9
Conservative gain from Independent		Swing		

Walton Park
Party	Candidate	Votes	%	±%
Conservative	Edward Ellis	1,608	45.3	+9.9
Liberal Democrats	Rab Makki	1,388	39.1	+2.1
Labour	Archibald Prempeh	472	13.3	−2.5
CPA	Suzanne Nti	85	2.4	+2.4
Majority		220	6.2	
Turnout		3,553	37.8	+3.4
Conservative gain from Liberal Democrats		Swing		

Whaddon
Party	Candidate	Votes	%	±%
Labour	Nigel Long	1,125	42.9	+0.1
Conservative	Donald McLeod	984	37.5	+2.5
Liberal Democrats	Ian Victory	220	8.4	+0.7
UKIP	Judith Green	202	7.7	−6.9
Better MK Independent	Raymond Thrussell	93	3.5	+3.5
Majority		141	5.4	−2.4
Turnout		2,624	40.3	−1.8
Labour hold		Swing		

Wolverton
Party	Candidate	Votes	%	±%
Labour	Norman Miles	1,172	32.2	−0.7
Liberal Democrats	Mike Galloway	1,156	31.7	+22.3
Conservative	Mohammed Anwar	689	18.9	+4.3
Green	Alan Francis	408	11.2	+0.2
Better MK Independent	Riaz Akhtar	218	6.0	+6.0
Majority		16	0.4	−14.2
Turnout		3,643	35.6	+0.8
Labour hold		Swing		
