= 2006 Mole Valley District Council election =

2006 UK local government election

Results of the 2006 Mole Valley District Council election

Elections to Mole Valley Council were held on 4 May 2006. One third of the council was up for election and the Conservative Party gained overall control of the council from no overall control. Overall turnout was 49.0%.

After the election, the composition of the council was:

- Conservative 23
- Liberal Democrat 15
- Independent 3

== Election result ==
Mole Valley local election result 2006
Party	Seats	Gains	Losses	Net gain/loss	Seats %	Votes %	Votes	+/−
Conservative	9	5	1	+4	64.3	48.3	12,318	+3.4%
Liberal Democrats	4	1	3	-2	28.6	34.4	8,788	+0.5%
Independent	1	0	2	-2	7.1	9.7	2,464	-1.5%
Labour	0	0	0	0	0	4.7	1,197	-3.2%
Green	0	0	0	0	0	2.4	600	+2.2%
UKIP	0	0	0	0	0	0.6	153	-1.3%

== Ward results ==
Ashtead Common
Party	Candidate	Votes	%	±%
Independent	William Northcott	860	51.6	+1.9
Conservative	Timothy Robertson	718	43.0	+7.2
Labour	John Gough	90	5.4	−1.9
Majority		142	8.6	−5.3
Turnout		1,668	53.3	+0.3
Independent hold		Swing		

Ashtead Park
Party	Candidate	Votes	%	±%
Conservative	Walter Davis	732	45.5	+9.6
Independent	Peter Smith	709	44.1	−7.3
Labour	Susan Gilchrist	66	4.1	+0.2
UKIP	Robert Cane	59	3.7	−1.7
Green	Anthony Cooper	42	2.6	−0.8
Majority		23	1.4	
Turnout		1,608	50.5	−1.9
Conservative gain from Independent		Swing		

Ashtead Village
Party	Candidate	Votes	%	±%
Conservative	Sylvia Sharland	1,002	45.4	+3.7
Independent	Christine Kerton	895	40.5	0.0
Labour	Clive Scott	120	5.4	−2.7
Green	Jennifer Huggett	97	4.4	+4.4
UKIP	Helen Howell	94	4.3	−5.4
Majority		107	4.9	+3.7
Turnout		2,208	49.4	−1.7
Conservative gain from Independent		Swing		

Bookham North
Party	Candidate	Votes	%	±%
Conservative	Janette Purkiss	1,431	61.2	+4.5
Liberal Democrats	Paul Tillott	906	38.8	−1.8
Majority		525	22.4	+6.3
Turnout		2,337	53.0	−6.9
Conservative hold		Swing		

Bookham South
Party	Candidate	Votes	%	±%
Conservative	John Chandler	1,441	57.0	+13.4
Liberal Democrats	Jehangir Haque	991	39.2	−13.6
Labour	Simon Bottomley	97	3.8	+0.2
Majority		450	17.8	
Turnout		2,529	58.9	+5.7
Conservative gain from Liberal Democrats		Swing		

Brockham, Betchworth and Buckland
Party	Candidate	Votes	%	±%
Conservative	Kate Horden	924	49.8	+16.9
Liberal Democrats	Valerie Potter	869	46.8	−14.9
Labour	Ian James	64	3.4	−2.0
Majority		55	3.0	
Turnout		1,857	53.6	+15.4
Conservative gain from Liberal Democrats		Swing		

Capel, Leigh and Newdigate
Party	Candidate	Votes	%	±%
Liberal Democrats	Iain Murdoch	882	51.1	+26.7
Conservative	Julian Shersby	782	45.3	−21.3
Labour	Carol Millard	62	3.6	−5.5
Majority		100	5.8	
Turnout		1,726	53.8	+18.2
Liberal Democrats gain from Conservative		Swing		

Dorking North
Party	Candidate	Votes	%	±%
Liberal Democrats	Derrick Burt	785	53.2	+1.4
Conservative	Mark Aspinall	420	28.5	−13.3
Green	Robert Sedgwick	213	14.4	+14.4
Labour	John Wilson	58	3.9	−2.6
Majority		365	24.7	+14.7
Turnout		1,476	48.7	+0.2
Liberal Democrats hold		Swing		

Dorking South
Party	Candidate	Votes	%	±%
Liberal Democrats	Margaret Cooksey	1,102	47.1	−6.6
Conservative	Christopher House	869	37.1	−2.0
Green	Amanda Barnett	248	10.6	+10.6
Labour	Nicholas Trier	122	5.2	−2.0
Majority		233	10.0	−4.6
Turnout		2,341	47.0	−1.6
Liberal Democrats hold		Swing		

Fetcham East
Party	Candidate	Votes	%	±%
Conservative	Kathryn Westwood	957	69.1	+4.0
Liberal Democrats	Katherine Grigson	363	26.2	−2.9
Labour	John Forehead	64	4.6	−1.2
Majority		594	42.9	+6.9
Turnout		1,384	48.5	−2.7
Conservative hold		Swing		

Fetcham West
Party	Candidate	Votes	%	±%
Conservative	Timothy Hall	928	64.1	+11.0
Liberal Democrats	Alice Humphreys	519	35.9	−5.4
Majority		409	28.2	+16.4
Turnout		1,447	47.6	−2.9
Conservative hold		Swing		

Holmwoods
Party	Candidate	Votes	%	±%
Liberal Democrats	Caroline Salmon	1,062	61.6	+6.4
Conservative	David Mir	532	30.9	−5.1
Labour	Keith Davis	130	7.5	−1.4
Majority		530	30.7	+11.5
Turnout		1,724	38.0	−2.9
Liberal Democrats hold		Swing		

Leatherhead North
Party	Candidate	Votes	%	±%
Conservative	Penelope Hedgeland	757	43.7	+9.5
Liberal Democrats	Hubert Carr	754	43.5	+10.7
Labour	David Lawrence	221	12.8	−20.2
Majority		3	0.2	−1.0
Turnout		1,732	39.3	+4.2
Conservative gain from Liberal Democrats		Swing		

Leatherhead South
Party	Candidate	Votes	%	±%
Conservative	David Sharland	825	55.6	+1.8
Liberal Democrats	David Smith	555	37.4	+3.7
Labour	Michael Ward	103	6.9	−5.6
Majority		270	18.2	−1.9
Turnout		1,483	48.3	−3.2
Conservative hold		Swing		
