= 2006 Weymouth and Portland Borough Council election =

2006 UK local government election

Results of the 2006 Weymouth and Portland Borough Council election

Elections to Weymouth and Portland Borough Council were held on 4 May 2006. One third of the council was up for election and the council stayed under no overall control.

After the election, the composition of the council was

- Liberal Democrat 13
- Conservative 11
- Labour 7
- Independent 5

== Election result ==
Weymouth and Portland local election result 2006
Party	Seats	Gains	Losses	Net gain/loss	Seats %	Votes %	Votes	+/−
Conservative	5	3	0	+3	41.7	33.3	5,041	+4.5%
Liberal Democrats	3	0	1	-1	25.0	30.7	4,646	-1.3%
Labour	2	0	2	-2	16.7	24.4	3,687	-3.5%
Independent	2	0	0	0	16.7	9.9	1,498	+0.9%
Green	0	0	0	0	0	1.7	259	+1.7%

One Labour candidate was unopposed.

== Ward results ==
Littlemoor
Party	Candidate	Votes	%	±%
Labour	Mary Tewkesbury	479	55.3	
Conservative	Ashley Newman	258	29.8	
Liberal Democrats	Alan Walker	129	14.9	
Majority		221	25.5	
Turnout		866	36.0	+2.9
Labour hold		Swing		

Melcombe Regis
Party	Candidate	Votes	%	±%
Liberal Democrats	Lynne Herbert	609	41.8	
Conservative	George Afedakis	550	37.7	
Labour	Maria Blackwood	194	13.3	
Green	Paul McIntosh	105	7.2	
Majority		59	4.1	
Turnout		1,458	32.8	−2.2
Liberal Democrats hold		Swing		

Preston
Party	Candidate	Votes	%	±%
Conservative	Hazel Bruce	1,146	48.5	
Liberal Democrats	Richard Collings	1,056	44.7	
Labour	Maureen Drake	163	6.9	
Majority		90	3.8	
Turnout		2,365	55.4	−4.7
Conservative gain from Liberal Democrats		Swing		

Tophill East
Party	Candidate	Votes	%	±%
Independent	Margaret Leicester	235	27.4	
Conservative	Corinne Peters	198	23.1	
Independent	James Holt	150	17.5	
Liberal Democrats	Simon Robinson	149	17.4	
Labour	Margaret Atwell	126	14.7	
Majority		37	4.3	
Turnout		858	35.3	−4.1
Independent hold		Swing		

Tophill West
Party	Candidate	Votes	%	±%
Independent	Stephen Flew	347	28.3	
Conservative	Mark Peters	254	20.8	
Independent	David Hawkins	236	19.3	
Labour	James Draper	196	16.0	
Independent	Timothy Woodcock	191	15.6	
Majority		93	7.5	
Turnout		1,224	32.4	−5.4
Independent hold		Swing		

Underhill
Party	Candidate	Votes	%	±%
Labour	Paul Kimber	uncontested		
Labour hold		Swing		

Upwey and Broadwey
Party	Candidate	Votes	%	±%
Conservative	Robert Dunster	459	40.6	
Liberal Democrats	Raymond Banham	384	34.0	
Labour	Colin Huckle	288	25.5	
Majority		75	6.6	
Turnout		1,131	41.1	−1.1
Conservative hold		Swing		

Westham East
Party	Candidate	Votes	%	±%
Liberal Democrats	Ian James	489	56.6	
Labour	David Dowle	198	22.9	
Conservative	Nicholas Wyness	177	20.5	
Majority		291	33.7	
Turnout		864	33.1	−4.5
Liberal Democrats hold		Swing		

Westham North
Party	Candidate	Votes	%	±%
Liberal Democrats	Christine James	1,132	69.2	
Labour	Kristine Hallett	503	30.8	
Majority		629	38.4	
Turnout		1,635	41.2	−2.5
Liberal Democrats hold		Swing		

Wey Valley
Party	Candidate	Votes	%	±%
Conservative	Alison Scott	664	53.7	
Labour	Alan Chedzoy	418	33.8	
Green	Brian Heatley	154	12.5	
Majority		246	19.9	
Turnout		1,236	44.9	−8.6
Conservative hold		Swing		

Weymouth West
Party	Candidate	Votes	%	±%
Conservative	Peter O'Neill	674	39.9	
Labour	Sharon Mitchell	511	30.2	
Liberal Democrats	Marion Pullen	505	29.9	
Majority		163	9.7	
Turnout		1,690	44.1	−3.2
Conservative gain from Labour		Swing		

Wyke Regis
Party	Candidate	Votes	%	±%
Conservative	Geoffrey Petherick	661	36.6	
Labour	Anne Kenwood	611	33.9	
Independent	Jack Biggs	339	18.8	
Liberal Democrats	Ian Saunders	193	10.7	
Majority		50	2.7	
Turnout		1,804	43.1	−2.6
Conservative gain from Labour		Swing		
