= 2006 Tandridge District Council election =

2006 UK local government election

Map of the results of the 2006 Tandridge District Council election. Conservatives in blue and Liberal Democrats in yellow. Wards in grey were not contested in 2006.

The 2006 Tandridge District Council election took place on 4 May 2006 to elect members of Tandridge District Council in Surrey, England. One third of the council was up for election and the Conservative Party stayed in overall control of the council.

After the election, the composition of the council was:

- Conservative 29
- Liberal Democrat 10
- Labour 2
- Independent 1

== Election result ==
Overall turnout at the election was 45.40%.

Tandridge local election result 2006
| Party | Seats | Gains | Losses | Net gain/loss | Seats % | Votes % | Votes | +/− |
|---|---|---|---|---|---|---|---|---|
| Conservative | 12 | 2 | 0 | +2 | 85.7 | 55.2 | 11,872 | +4.4% |
| Liberal Democrats | 2 | 0 | 1 | -1 | 14.3 | 34.1 | 7,332 | +1.9% |
| Labour | 0 | 0 | 0 | 0 | 0 | 5.4 | 1,163 | -2.8% |
| UKIP | 0 | 0 | 0 | 0 | 0 | 4.7 | 1,011 | -4.1% |
| Green | 0 | 0 | 0 | 0 | 0 | 0.6 | 124 | +0.6% |
| Independent | 0 | 0 | 1 | -1 | 0 | 0 | 0 | 0 |

== Ward results ==
Bletchingley and Nuffield
| Party | Candidate | Votes | % | ±% |
|---|---|---|---|---|
| Conservative | Antoun Elias | 1,103 | 63.8 | +3.9 |
| Liberal Democrats | Richard Fowler | 318 | 18.4 | −3.0 |
| UKIP | Graham Bailey | 203 | 11.7 | −0.1 |
| Labour | David Wilbraham | 104 | 6.0 | −0.8 |
| Majority | | 785 | 45.4 | +6.9 |
| Turnout | | 1,728 | 39.8 | −2.6 |
| Conservative gain from Independent | | Swing | | |

Burstow, Horne and Outwood
| Party | Candidate | Votes | % | ±% |
|---|---|---|---|---|
| Conservative | Alan Brown | 1,019 | 62.4 | +8.1 |
| Liberal Democrats | Louise Martin | 392 | 24.0 | +0.7 |
| UKIP | William Nock | 223 | 13.6 | −8.8 |
| Majority | | 627 | 38.4 | +7.4 |
| Turnout | | 1,634 | 38.2 | −2.8 |
| Conservative hold | | Swing | | |

Dormansland and Felcourt
| Party | Candidate | Votes | % | ±% |
|---|---|---|---|---|
| Conservative | Michael Sydney | 774 | 68.9 | +8.6 |
| Liberal Democrats | Anthony Hardisty | 349 | 31.1 | −8.6 |
| Majority | | 425 | 37.8 | +17.2 |
| Turnout | | 1,123 | 39.3 | +3.2 |
| Conservative hold | | Swing | | |

Godstone
| Party | Candidate | Votes | % | ±% |
|---|---|---|---|---|
| Conservative | Rosemary Thorn | 900 | 44.3 | −3.9 |
| Liberal Democrats | Colin White | 844 | 41.6 | +11.1 |
| UKIP | Richard Grant | 185 | 9.1 | −5.4 |
| Labour | Maxine Mathews | 102 | 5.0 | −1.9 |
| Majority | | 56 | 2.7 | −15.0 |
| Turnout | | 2,031 | 46.8 | +1.6 |
| Conservative gain from Liberal Democrats | | Swing | | |

Harestone
| Party | Candidate | Votes | % | ±% |
|---|---|---|---|---|
| Conservative | Beverley Connolly | 845 | 65.8 | +4.3 |
| Liberal Democrats | Anne Bell | 371 | 28.9 | −9.6 |
| Labour | Christopher Brooks | 69 | 5.4 | +5.4 |
| Majority | | 474 | 36.9 | +13.9 |
| Turnout | | 1,285 | 45.8 | −2.7 |
| Conservative hold | | Swing | | |

Limpsfield
| Party | Candidate | Votes | % | ±% |
|---|---|---|---|---|
| Conservative | Eric Morgan | 894 | 65.2 | +5.0 |
| Liberal Democrats | Mark Wilson | 478 | 34.8 | −0.6 |
| Majority | | 416 | 30.4 | +5.6 |
| Turnout | | 1,372 | 49.7 | +8.1 |
| Conservative hold | | Swing | | |

Lingfield and Crowhurst
| Party | Candidate | Votes | % | ±% |
|---|---|---|---|---|
| Conservative | Brian Perkins | 812 | 52.5 | +9.3 |
| Liberal Democrats | Lisa Bangs | 735 | 47.5 | −5.4 |
| Majority | | 77 | 5.0 | |
| Turnout | | 1,547 | 51.8 | +0.2 |
| Conservative hold | | Swing | | |

Oxted North and Tandridge
| Party | Candidate | Votes | % | ±% |
|---|---|---|---|---|
| Conservative | David Weightman | 1,300 | 67.0 | +9.1 |
| Liberal Democrats | Anne-Marie Bunting | 639 | 33.0 | +1.8 |
| Majority | | 661 | 34.0 | +7.3 |
| Turnout | | 1,939 | 46.2 | −3.8 |
| Conservative hold | | Swing | | |

Oxted South
| Party | Candidate | Votes | % | ±% |
|---|---|---|---|---|
| Conservative | Barry Compton | 913 | 40.4 | +3.0 |
| Labour | Barbara Harling | 791 | 35.0 | −0.7 |
| Liberal Democrats | Ceri Lewis | 261 | 11.5 | −2.8 |
| UKIP | Anthony Stone | 172 | 7.6 | −5.1 |
| Green | Michaela O'Brien | 124 | 5.5 | +5.5 |
| Majority | | 122 | 5.4 | +3.7 |
| Turnout | | 2,261 | 54.9 | −0.8 |
| Conservative hold | | Swing | | |

Queens Park
| Party | Candidate | Votes | % | ±% |
|---|---|---|---|---|
| Conservative | Matthew Groves | 784 | 51.7 | +4.7 |
| Liberal Democrats | Lucy Darlow | 732 | 48.3 | −4.7 |
| Majority | | 52 | 3.4 | |
| Turnout | | 1,516 | 55.4 | −1.7 |
| Conservative hold | | Swing | | |

Warlingham East, Chelsham and Farleigh
| Party | Candidate | Votes | % | ±% |
|---|---|---|---|---|
| Liberal Democrats | Simon Morrow | 878 | 47.6 | +9.1 |
| Conservative | David Cooley | 737 | 40.0 | +3.0 |
| UKIP | Martin Haley | 228 | 12.4 | −5.4 |
| Majority | | 141 | 7.6 | +6.1 |
| Turnout | | 1,843 | 45.7 | +2.0 |
| Liberal Democrats hold | | Swing | | |

Warlingham West
| Party | Candidate | Votes | % | ±% |
|---|---|---|---|---|
| Conservative | Glynis Whittle | 843 | 69.3 | −0.4 |
| Liberal Democrats | Sarah Morrow | 374 | 30.7 | +0.4 |
| Majority | | 469 | 38.6 | −0.8 |
| Turnout | | 1,217 | 47.8 | +1.6 |
| Conservative hold | | Swing | | |

Westway
| Party | Candidate | Votes | % | ±% |
|---|---|---|---|---|
| Conservative | Rosalind Langham | 584 | 53.3 | −2.5 |
| Liberal Democrats | David Gosling | 414 | 37.8 | +13.0 |
| Labour | Elena Tully | 97 | 8.9 | −10.5 |
| Majority | | 170 | 15.5 | −15.5 |
| Turnout | | 1,095 | 38.5 | +4.0 |
| Conservative hold | | Swing | | |

Whyteleafe
| Party | Candidate | Votes | % | ±% |
|---|---|---|---|---|
| Liberal Democrats | Sakina Bradbury | 547 | 60.0 | −4.6 |
| Conservative | Olwen Watson | 364 | 40.0 | +4.6 |
| Majority | | 183 | 20.0 | −9.2 |
| Turnout | | 911 | 38.1 | +0.2 |
| Liberal Democrats hold | | Swing | | |
