= 2006 Adur District Council election =

2006 UK local government election

Map of the results of the 2006 Adur council election. Conservatives in blue, Liberal Democrats in yellow and Independent in white.

Elections to Adur District Council were held on 4 May 2006. Half of the council was up for election and the Conservative Party held overall control of the council.

After the election, the composition of the council was:

- Conservative 26
- Independent 2
- Liberal Democrat 1

== Results ==
Adur local election result 2006
Party	Seats	Gains	Losses	Net gain/loss	Seats %	Votes %	Votes	+/−
Conservative	12	2	0	+2	85.7	49.3	6,813	-2.6%
Liberal Democrats	1	0	0	0	7.1	26.9	3,718	+13.5%
Independent	1	0	0	0	7.1	5.9	809	-5.3%
Labour	0	0	2	-2	0	11.0	1,516	-9.4%
Green	0	0	0	0	0	6.9	955	+4.7%

2 Conservatives were unopposed.

== Ward results ==
Buckingham
Party	Candidate	Votes	%	±%
Conservative	Gavin Ayling	uncontested		
Conservative hold		Swing		

Churchill
Party	Candidate	Votes	%	±%
Conservative	Jaynie Sykes-Strudwick	575	52.8	
Liberal Democrats	Martin Hesketh	514	47.2	
Majority		61	5.6	
Turnout		1,089		
Conservative hold		Swing		

Cokeham
Party	Candidate	Votes	%	±%
Conservative	David Simmons	554	47.3	
Labour	Kenneth Bashford	345	29.4	
Liberal Democrats	Margret Bentley	273	23.3	
Majority		209	17.9	
Turnout		1,172		
Conservative gain from Labour		Swing		

Eastbrook
Party	Candidate	Votes	%	±%
Conservative	James Funnell	uncontested		
Conservative hold		Swing		

Hillside
Party	Candidate	Votes	%	±%
Conservative	Janet Mockridge	684	59.3	
Liberal Democrats	Andrew Mortimer	250	21.7	
Labour	Barry Thompson	219	19.0	
Majority		254	37.6	
Turnout		1,153		
Conservative hold		Swing		

Manor
Party	Candidate	Votes	%	±%
Conservative	Angela Mills	685	59.6	
Liberal Democrats	Moira Collins	464	40.4	
Majority		221	19.2	
Turnout		2,309		
Conservative hold		Swing		

Marine
Party	Candidate	Votes	%	±%
Independent	Keith Fayers-Morrissey	809	75.9	
Green	Vincent Tilsley	153	14.4	
Liberal Democrats	Cecily Welch	104	9.8	
Majority		656	61.5	
Turnout		2,076		
Independent hold		Swing		

Mash Barn
Party	Candidate	Votes	%	±%
Liberal Democrats	Richard Burt	401	44.5	
Conservative	Ann Bridges	396	43.9	
Green	Leslie Brockhurst	105	11.6	
Majority		5	0.6	
Turnout		902		
Liberal Democrats hold		Swing		

Peverel
Party	Candidate	Votes	%	±%
Conservative	Brian Boggis	569	56.3	
Liberal Democrats	Kimberley Bonnett	287	28.4	
Labour	Joyce Burns	155	15.3	
Majority		282	27.9	
Turnout		1,867		
Conservative hold		Swing		

St. Mary's
Party	Candidate	Votes	%	±%
Conservative	Victoria Parkin	473	47.2	
Green	Moyra Martin	203	20.2	
Liberal Democrats	Robert King	168	16.7	
Labour	Andrew Bray	159	15.9	
Majority		270	27.0	
Turnout		1,003		
Conservative hold		Swing		

St. Nicolas
Party	Candidate	Votes	%	±%
Conservative	Neil Parkin	767	57.7	
Green	Susan Board	234	17.6	
Liberal Democrats	Victoria Broom-Sopp	188	14.1	
Labour	Stephen Mear	140	10.5	
Majority		533	40.1	
Turnout		1,329		
Conservative hold		Swing		

Southlands
Party	Candidate	Votes	%	±%
Conservative	Carl English	500	49.5	
Labour	Peter Berry	337	33.3	
Liberal Democrats	John Hilditch	174	17.2	
Majority		163	16.2	
Turnout		1,011		
Conservative gain from Labour		Swing		

Southwick Green
Party	Candidate	Votes	%	±%
Conservative	Julie Searle	748	63.0	
Liberal Democrats	Clive Connor	278	23.4	
Labour	Ian Lidbetter	161	13.6	
Majority		470	39.6	
Turnout		1,187		
Conservative hold		Swing		

Widewater
Party	Candidate	Votes	%	±%
Conservative	Christine Turner	862	49.6	
Liberal Democrats	Doris Martin	617	35.5	
Green	Celia Behan	260	15.0	
Majority		245	14.1	
Turnout		1,739		
Conservative hold		Swing		
