= 2006 Tamworth Borough Council election =

2006 UK local government election

Results of the 2006 Tamworth Borough Council election

Elections to Tamworth Borough Council were held on 4 May 2006. One third of the council was up for election and the Conservative Party stayed in overall control of the council. Overall turnout was 32.3%

After the election, the composition of the council was:

- Conservative 21
- Labour 8
- Independent 1

== Election result ==
Tamworth local election result 2006
Party	Seats	Gains	Losses	Net gain/loss	Seats %	Votes %	Votes	+/−
Conservative	8	5	0	+5	80.0	50.9	9,425	+7.9%
Labour	2	0	5	-5	20.0	41.5	7,673	+4.2%
Liberal Democrats	0	0	0	0	0	7.6	1,402	-3.7%

== Ward results ==
Amington
Party	Candidate	Votes	%	±%
Conservative	John Garner	1,136	56.6	+9.2
Labour	Timothy Healy	870	43.4	+9.9
Majority		266	13.2	−0.7
Turnout		2,006	33.1	+2.4
Conservative hold		Swing		

Belgrave
Party	Candidate	Votes	%	±%
Conservative	Martin Summers	921	57.0	+20.2
Labour	Nigel Brindley	694	43.0	+8.2
Majority		227	14.0	+12.0
Turnout		1,615	29.2	+0.7
Conservative gain from Labour		Swing		

Bolehall
Party	Candidate	Votes	%	±%
Labour	Kenneth Norchi	1,111	61.3	+4.8
Conservative	Andrew James	701	38.7	−4.8
Majority		410	22.6	+9.6
Turnout		1,812	33.4	+2.3
Labour hold		Swing		

Castle
Party	Candidate	Votes	%	±%
Conservative	Graham Ingley	1,017	50.3	+6.9
Labour	Marion Couchman	757	37.5	+1.7
Liberal Democrats	Jennifer Pinkett	246	12.2	−8.5
Majority		260	12.8	+5.2
Turnout		2,020	35.7	+2.5
Conservative gain from Labour		Swing		

Glascote
Party	Candidate	Votes	%	±%
Labour	Simon Peaple	728	53.6	+14.8
Conservative	Debra James	630	46.4	+22.3
Majority		98	7.2	+5.5
Turnout		1,358	23.9	−2.7
Labour hold		Swing		

Mercian
Party	Candidate	Votes	%	±%
Conservative	Bruce Boughton	833	42.0	−0.1
Labour	William Fuller	671	33.8	−2.0
Liberal Democrats	Geoffrey Blake	479	24.2	+2.2
Majority		162	8.2	+1.9
Turnout		1,983	37.0	−0.2
Conservative gain from Labour		Swing		

Spital
Party	Candidate	Votes	%	±%
Conservative	Kenneth Gant	1,116	50.7	−0.5
Labour	Karen Hirons	726	33.0	+3.1
Liberal Democrats	Jennifer Blake	360	16.3	−2.7
Majority		390	17.7	−3.6
Turnout		2,202	39.5	−0.1
Conservative hold		Swing		

Stonydelph
Party	Candidate	Votes	%	±%
Conservative	Steven Pritchard	827	56.7	+20.9
Labour	Margaret Clarke	632	43.3	+12.1
Majority		195	13.4	+10.6
Turnout		1,459	25.0	+0.2
Conservative gain from Labour		Swing		

Trinity
Party	Candidate	Votes	%	±%
Conservative	Michael Oates	1,109	54.4	+5.7
Labour	David Foster	613	30.1	+1.2
Liberal Democrats	Roger Jones	317	15.5	−6.9
Majority		496	24.3	+4.5
Turnout		2,039	34.8	+1.7
Conservative hold		Swing		

Wilnecote
Party	Candidate	Votes	%	±%
Conservative	Lee Bates	1,135	56.6	+6.4
Labour	Mary Lewis	871	43.4	−6.4
Majority		264	13.2	+12.8
Turnout		2,006	31.4	+1.1
Conservative gain from Labour		Swing		
