= South Tyneside Council elections =

Local government elections in Tyne and Wear, England

South Tyneside Council elections are generally held three years out of every four, with a third of the council being elected each time. South Tyneside Council is the local authority for the metropolitan borough of South Tyneside in Tyne and Wear, England. Since the last boundary changes in 2004, 54 councillors are elected, 3 from each of the 18 wards.

== Council elections ==
- 1998 South Tyneside Metropolitan Borough Council election
- 1999 South Tyneside Metropolitan Borough Council election
- 2000 South Tyneside Metropolitan Borough Council election
- 2002 South Tyneside Metropolitan Borough Council election
- 2003 South Tyneside Metropolitan Borough Council election
- 2004 South Tyneside Metropolitan Borough Council election (whole council elected after boundary changes which reduced the number of seats by 6)
- 2006 South Tyneside Metropolitan Borough Council election
- 2007 South Tyneside Metropolitan Borough Council election
- 2008 South Tyneside Metropolitan Borough Council election
- 2010 South Tyneside Metropolitan Borough Council election
- 2011 South Tyneside Metropolitan Borough Council election
- 2012 South Tyneside Metropolitan Borough Council election
- 2014 South Tyneside Metropolitan Borough Council election
- 2015 South Tyneside Metropolitan Borough Council election
- 2016 South Tyneside Metropolitan Borough Council election
- 2018 South Tyneside Metropolitan Borough Council election
- 2019 South Tyneside Metropolitan Borough Council election
- 2021 South Tyneside Metropolitan Borough Council election
- 2022 South Tyneside Metropolitan Borough Council election
- 2023 South Tyneside Metropolitan Borough Council election
- 2024 South Tyneside Metropolitan Borough Council election
- 2026 South Tyneside Metropolitan Borough Council election (whole council elected after boundary changes)

== Borough result maps ==
2004 results map

2006 results map

2007 results map

2008 results map

2010 results map

2011 results map

2012 results map

2014 results map

2015 results map

2016 results map

2018 results map

2019 results map

2021 results map

2022 results map

2023 results map

2024 results map

2026 results map

== By-election results ==
=== 1994-1998 ===
Whiteleas By-Election 27 February 1997
Party	Candidate	Votes	%	±%
Labour		959	76.7	
Independent		154	12.3	
Conservative		137	11.0	
Majority		805	64.4	
Turnout		1,250	21.5	
Labour hold		Swing		

Cleadon & East Boldon By-Election 28 August 1997
Party	Candidate	Votes	%	±%
Liberal Democrats		991	55.7	+7.4
Conservative		519	29.2	+1.8
Labour		249	14.0	−10.4
Independent		19	1.1	+1.1
Majority		471	26.5	
Turnout		1,778	24.5	
Liberal Democrats hold		Swing		

Bede By-Election 3 September 1997
Party	Candidate	Votes	%	±%
Labour		685	80.4	
Conservative		98	11.5	
Socialist		69	7.9	
Majority		587	68.9	
Turnout		852	15.2	
Labour hold		Swing		

=== 1998-2002 ===
Hebburn Quay By-Election 17 December 1998
Party	Candidate	Votes	%	±%
Liberal Democrats		669	55.7	+3.0
Labour		452	37.6	−5.8
Conservative		42	3.5	−3.4
Socialist Party		39	3.2	+3.2
Majority		217	18.1	
Turnout		1,202	20.0	
Liberal Democrats hold		Swing		

=== 2006-2010 ===
Cleadon & East Boldon By-Election 14 September 2006
Party	Candidate	Votes	%	±%
Conservative	Jeffrey Milburn	1,057	43.1	+2.0
Liberal Democrats	Alan Mordain	669	27.3	+5.7
Labour	Lewis Atkinson	601	24.5	+4.1
Green	Christopher Haine	124	5.1	+5.1
Majority		388	15.8	
Turnout		2,451	35.2	
Conservative hold		Swing		

Westoe By-Election 10 September 2009
Party	Candidate	Votes	%	±%
Independent	Allen Branley	694	30.6	−35.0
Labour	Allan West	567	25.0	+6.1
Conservative	Anthony Dailly	320	14.1	+3.3
BNP	Les Lovelock	266	11.7	+11.7
Liberal Democrats	Bill Troupe	225	9.9	+9.9
Independent	David Wood	194	8.6	+8.6
Majority		127	5.6	
Turnout		2,266	34.5	
Independent hold		Swing		

Primrose By-Election 25 February 2010
Party	Candidate	Votes	%	±%
Labour	Ken Stephenson	854	42.0	−6.5
BNP	Pete Hodgkinson	566	27.9	−5.1
Independent	Aaron Luke	213	10.5	+10.5
Independent	David Rice	174	8.6	+8.6
Conservative	Anthony Lanaghan	124	6.1	−12.4
Liberal Democrats	Susan Troupe	100	4.9	+4.9
Majority		288	14.1	
Turnout		2,031	32.3	
Labour hold		Swing		

=== 2010-2014 ===
Cleadon and East Boldon By-Election 27 June 2013
Party	Candidate	Votes	%	±%
Labour	Margaret Meling	991	38.8	−7.2
Conservative	Fiona Milburn	899	35.2	−18.8
UKIP	Colin Campbell	666	26.1	+26.1
Majority		92	3.6	
Turnout		2,556		
Labour gain from Conservative		Swing		

Primrose By-Election 27 June 2013
Party	Candidate	Votes	%	±%
Labour	Moira Smith	755	50.3	−25.0
UKIP	John Clarke	520	34.6	+34.6
BNP	Martin Vaughan	146	9.7	−3.6
Conservative	John Coe	80	5.3	−6.1
Majority		235	15.7	
Turnout		1,501		
Labour hold		Swing		

=== 2014-2018 ===
Westoe By-Election 2 October 2014
Party	Candidate	Votes	%	±%
UKIP	Norman Dennis	676	40.9	+2.9
Labour	Katharine Maxwell	625	37.9	−6.9
Conservative	John Coe	219	13.3	−3.9
Green	Tony Bengtssom	90	5.5	+5.5
Liberal Democrats	Carole Troupe	41	2.5	+2.5
Majority		51	3.1	
Turnout		1,651		
UKIP gain from Independent		Swing		

=== 2018-2022 ===
Fellgate and Hedworth By-Election 29 July 2021
Party	Candidate	Votes	%	±%
Labour	Jay Potts	850	49.1	+9.6
Independent	John Robertson	555	32.0	−15.8
Conservative	Chris Smith	158	9.1	+4.7
Liberal Democrats	David Wilkinson	125	7.2	−1.0
Green	Kelly Hill	44	2.5	New
Majority		295	17.1	N/A
Turnout		1,738	30.6	
Labour gain from Independent		Swing	▲12.7	

Cleadon & East Bolden By-Election 9 September 2021
Party	Candidate	Votes	%	±%
Conservative	Stan Wildhirt	989	35.1	−12.9
Green	David Herbert	943	33.5	+20.6
Labour	Philip Toulson	886	31.4	−5.9
Majority		46	1.6	
Turnout		2,823	40.7	
Conservative hold		Swing	▼16.8	

=== 2022-2026 ===
Primrose By-Election 27 June 2024
Party	Candidate	Votes	%	±%
Independent	Joan Hamilton	762	54.2	+54.2
Labour	Kevin Brydon	543	38.6	+3.8
Green	Darius Seago	102	7.2	−1.3
Majority		219	15.6	
Turnout		1,407		
Independent hold		Swing		

=== 2026-2030 ===
Harton By-Election 6 August 2026
Party	Candidate	Votes	%	±%
Reform	Katie Groom	628	35.3	
Labour	Neil Maxwell	354	19.9	
Green	Kathryn Kaupa	312	17.5	
Independent	Karen Myers	285	16.0	
Independent	Phil Brown	119	6.7	
Conservative	Sam Hill	57	3.2	
Liberal Democrats	Mark Robson	24	1.3	
Majority		274	15.4	
Turnout		1,779		
Reform hold		Swing		
