= 2010 South Tyneside Metropolitan Borough Council election =

2010 English local government election

Map of the 2010 South Tyneside Metropolitan Borough Council election

The 2010 South Tyneside Metropolitan Borough Council election took place on 6 May 2010 to elect a third of the members of South Tyneside Metropolitan Borough Council, the council of South Tyneside in England. This was on the same day as the other local elections as well as the 2010 United Kingdom general election. The previous council election took place in 2008 and the following election was held in 2011. In the election, the council stayed under Labour control.

== Results ==
| Party | Previous | Seats +/- | 2010 |
|---|---|---|---|
| Conservative | 31 | ▲5 | 36 |
| Labour | 3 | Steady | 3 |
| Liberal Democrat | 3 | ▼1 | 2 |
| Other | 17 | ▼2 | 13 |

== See also ==
- South Tyneside Metropolitan Borough Council elections
