= 2023 South Tyneside Metropolitan Borough Council election =

2023 UK local government election

← 2022	4 May 2023	2024 →

18 out of 54 seats to South Tyneside Metropolitan Borough Council 28 seats needed for a majority

	First party	Second party
Leader	Tracey Dixon	David Francis
Party	Labour	Green
Last election	40 seats, 48.6%	6 seats, 19.2%
Seats before	40	6
Seats after	38	9
Seat change	▼3	▲3
	Third party	Fourth party
Leader	Glenn Thompson	N/A
Party	Independent	Conservative
Last election	6 seats, 16.2%	1 seat, 15.5%
Seats before	6	1 (Note: The one Conservative prior to the election was Ian Forster.)
Seats after	6	1
- Winner of each seat at the 2023 South Tyneside Metropolitan Borough Council election
Leader before election
Tracey Dixon
Labour
Leader after election
Tracey Dixon
Labour

The 2023 South Tyneside Metropolitan Borough Council election took place on 4 May 2023, to elect members of the South Tyneside Metropolitan Borough Council in Tyne and Wear, England. This was on the same day as other local elections.

Labour retained its majority on the council.

== Summary ==
=== Election result ===
2023 South Tyneside Metropolitan Borough Council election
Party	This election			Full council			This election		
Party	Seats	Net	Seats %	Other	Total	Total %	Votes	Votes %	+/−
Labour	11	▼3	61.11	27	38	70.37	15,646	43.96	
Green	4	▲3	22.22	5	9	16.67	7,722	21.70	
Independent	3	Steady	16.67	3	6	11.1	8,065	22.66	
Conservative	0	Steady	0.00	1	1	1.85	3,676	10.33	
Liberal Democrats	0	Steady	0.00	0	0	0.00	181	0.51	
Reform UK	0	Steady	0.00	0	0	0.00	176	0.50	

== Ward results ==
The Statement of Persons Nominated, which details the candidates standing in each ward, was released by South Tyneside Metropolitan Borough Council following the close of nominations on 5 April 2023.

=== Beacon & Bents ===
Beacon & Bents
Party	Candidate	Votes	%	±%
Green	David Roger Francis	1,494	60.19	+5.6
Labour	Masuda Piya Rahman	717	28.89	−5.5
Independent	David Wood	140	5.64	+1.3
Conservative	Ali Hayder	119	4.80	−1.9
Majority		777	31.3	
Turnout		2,482	36.2	
Registered electors		6,851		
Green hold				

=== Bede ===
Bede
Party	Candidate	Votes	%	±%
Independent	Keith Roberts	775	47.87	N/A
Labour	Sean McDonagh	635	39.22	−12.9
Green	John Chilton	107	6.61	−1.2
Conservative	William Smith	98	6.05	−8.2
Majority		140	8.65	
Turnout		1,619	27.8	
Registered electors		5,827		
Independent hold				

=== Biddick & All Saints ===
Biddick & All Saints
Party	Candidate	Votes	%	±%
Green	Rachael Milne	762	52.70	+26.3
Labour	Moynul Hussain	501	34.65	−12.2
Independent	Natalie Bell	95	6.57	N/A
Conservative	John Wood	81	5.60	−10.1
Majority		261	18.05	
Turnout		1,446	23.2	
Registered electors		6,240		
Green gain from Labour				

=== Boldon Colliery ===
Boldon Colliery
Party	Candidate	Votes	%	±%
Labour	Fay Cunningham	1,110	47.70	−7.5
Independent	Simon Oliver	826	35.50	+18.1
Conservative	Donald Wood	243	10.44	−4.1
Green	Darius Seago	142	6.10	−0.1
Majority		284	12.20	
Turnout		2,327	32.7	
Registered electors		7,118		
Labour hold				

=== Cleadon & East Boldon ===
Cleadon & East Boldon
Party	Candidate	Votes	%	±%
Green	Shirley Florence Ford	1,367	40.08	+3.9
Labour	Georgia Jamieson	1,051	30.81	−0.5
Conservative	Stan Wildhirt	918	26.91	−5.6
Independent	Jeff Milburn	70	2.05	N/A
Majority		316	9.27	
Turnout		3,411	49.6	
Registered electors		6,882		
Green gain from Labour				

=== Cleadon Park ===
Cleadon Park
Party	Candidate	Votes	%	±%
Labour	Susan Malcolm Traynor	598	36.87	−2.5
Independent	Steven Harrison	592	36.50	+12.8
Conservative	Chris Sanderson	225	13.87	−8.5
Green	John Riley	202	12.64	−1.9
Majority		6	0.37	
Turnout		1,622	28.5	
Registered electors		5,683		
Labour hold				

=== Fellgate & Hedworth ===
Fellgate & Hedworth
Party	Candidate	Votes	%	±%
Labour	Jay Potts	1,006	54.14	−13.6
Independent	Ian Diamond	725	39.02	+22.1
Green	Nic Cook	123	6.62	+2.5
Majority		281	15.12	
Turnout		1,858	32.9	
Registered electors		5,641		
Labour hold				

=== Harton ===
Harton
Party	Candidate	Votes	%	±%
Labour	Neil Maxwell	853	41.11	+3.3
Independent	Lawrence Nolan	722	34.80	−2.1
Green	Rhiannon Sian Curtis	318	15.33	−6.1
Reform UK	Jim Mouat	176	8.48	N/A
Majority		131	6.31	
Turnout		2,075	31.6	
Registered electors		6,564		
Labour hold				

=== Hebburn North ===
Hebburn North
Party	Candidate	Votes	%	±%
Labour	Adam Ellison	1,310	71.94	−0.1
Conservative	Tia Jade McMurray Sinclair	193	10.60	−3.2
Green	Colin Robert Tosh	189	10.38	−3.8
Liberal Democrats	Shay Whitehead	123	6.76	N/A
Majority		1,117	61.34	
Turnout		1,821	26.4	
Registered electors		6,904		
Labour hold				

=== Hebburn South ===
Hebburn South
Party	Candidate	Votes	%	±%
Labour	Shane Andrew Smith	1,087	50.68	−9.5
Independent	Brian Goodman	673	31.38	+11.7
Conservative	Carl Duncan	220	10.26	−4.2
Green	Briony Elizabeth Sommers	155	7.23	+1.6
Majority		414	19.3	
Turnout		2,145	29.2	
Registered electors		7,345		
Labour hold				

=== Horsley Hill ===
Horsley Hill
Party	Candidate	Votes	%	±%
Labour	Ruth Rachael Berkley	893	41.93	−5.9
Independent	Phil Brown	555	26.06	+9.2
Green	Carrie Richardson	354	16.62	+3.4
Conservative	Chloe Grant	324	15.21	−2.8
Majority		338	15.87	
Turnout		2,130	32.1	
Registered electors		6,640		
Labour hold				

=== Monkton ===
Monkton
Party	Candidate	Votes	%	±%
Labour	Margaret Mary Meling	1,087	61.24	+2.0
Green	Chris Davies	357	20.11	+10.4
Conservative	Michael Robert Ferry	315	17.75	+1.3
Majority		730	41.13	
Turnout		1,775	27.3	
Registered electors		6,505		
Labour hold				

=== Primrose ===
Primrose
Party	Candidate	Votes	%	±%
Independent	Paul James Milburn	869	51.48	N/A
Labour	Kevin Brydon	651	38.57	−1.7
Conservative	Luke Robson	89	5.27	−3.0
Green	Emmanuel Michael	75	4.44	+0.1
Majority		218	12.91	
Turnout		1,688	28.0	
Registered electors		6,030		
Independent hold				

=== Simonside & Rekendyke ===
Simonside & Rekendyke
Party	Candidate	Votes	%	±%
Labour	Judith Helen Taylor	856	50.71	+4.7
Independent	Kenneth George Wood	357	21.15	N/A
Green	Bethany Dionne Telford	342	20.26	−12.6
Conservative	Aaron Michael Cain	128	7.58	−4.3
Majority		499	29.56	
Turnout		1,688	26.7	
Registered electors		6,320		
Labour hold				

=== West Park ===
West Park
Party	Candidate	Votes	%	±%
Green	Jim Yare	996	55.49	−1.5
Labour	Anne Mellanby Hetherington	552	30.75	−0.1
Independent	Justin Knight	128	7.13	N/A
Conservative	Shaun Connolly	97	5.40	−6.7
Independent	Julie Angela Angell	20	1.11	N/A
Majority		444	24.74	
Turnout		1,795	33.8	
Registered electors		5,304		
Green gain from Labour				

=== Westoe ===
Westoe
Party	Candidate	Votes	%	±%
Independent	Glenn Michael Thompson	1,042	48.47	N/A
Labour	Michelle Teresa Turnbull	755	35.12	−5.2
Green	Georgina Holt	215	10.00	−4.1
Independent	Nigel Mark Reedman	74	3.44	−0.7
Liberal Democrats	Mark Ireland	58	2.70	N/A
Majority		287	13.35	
Turnout		2,150	35.6	
Registered electors		6,034		
Independent hold				

=== Whitburn & Marsden ===
Whitburn & Marsden
Party	Candidate	Votes	%	±%
Labour	Joyce Welsh	1,068	54.46	−3.0
Conservative	Heidi Wildhirt	515	26.26	+0.4
Green	Edward Littley	359	18.31	+1.7
Majority		553	28.20	
Turnout		1,961	33.4	
Registered electors		5,874		
Labour hold				

=== Whiteleas ===
Whiteleas
Party	Candidate	Votes	%	±%
Labour	Ernest Matthew Gibson	916	57.36	+5.4
Independent	Robin Anthony Coombes	402	25.17	N/A
Green	Sophie Jane Williams	165	10.33	−0.8
Conservative	Dawn Wildhirt	111	6.95	−6.7
Majority		514	32.19	
Turnout		1,597	25.9	
Registered electors		6,172		
Labour hold				
