= 2004 South Tyneside Metropolitan Borough Council election =

2004 UK local government election

Results of the 2004 South Tyneside Council election

The 2004 South Tyneside Metropolitan Borough Council election took place on 10 June 2004 to elect members of South Tyneside Metropolitan Borough Council in Tyne and Wear, England. The whole council was up for election with boundary changes since the last election in 2003 reducing the number of seats by 6. The Labour Party stayed in overall control of the council.

== Campaign ==
Before the election, South Tyneside was seen as one of Labour's safest councils in the north east of England – Labour having 49 of the 60 councillors; they were expected to remain in control of the council. The Boundary Committee for England had made changes in South Tyneside's wards since the 2003 election and these meant there would be 54 councillors elected from 18 wards, instead of the previous 60 councillors from 20 wards. The changes abolished All Saints and Rekendyke wards and new ward names included Biddick and All Saints, Hebburn North and Simonside and Rekendyke.

Labour was the only party which contested all 54 seats that were up for election, with the other candidates being made up of 23 Conservatives, 22 Liberal Democrats, 13 independents, 12 Progressives, 3 British National Party and 1 each from the Green Party and the National Front. The independent candidates included 4 former Labour councillors who had quit the party to stand as independents, Mervyn Owen, Tom Defty, Jim Caine and Allen Branley, as well as Allen Branley's wife Jane Branley.

The election was held with all postal voting, but delays relating to the printers meant that many voters received their ballot papers almost a week late.

== Election result ==
The results saw Labour defend a reduced majority on the council after winning 35 of the 54 seats. The independents and Progressives were jointly the largest opposition groups after the election after winning 6 seats each, with the Progressive leader, Jim Capstick, saying that the boundary changes had helped them to win all of the seats in Harton and West Park wards. The gains for the independents included the former Labour councillors, Tom Defty, who defeated the mayor and wife of the council leader, Linda Waggott, in Bede ward, and Allen Braley in Westoe ward, who was elected along with his wife Jane.

Meanwhile, the Conservatives had 3 councillors after the election, the most for decades, after winning all 3 seats in Cleadon and East Boldon ward at the expense of the Liberal Democrats. Among the Liberal Democrats who failed to be elected in Cleadon and East Boldon was the leader of the party on the council, Jim Selby, but the party did gain one seat in Biddick & All Saints ward.

South Tyneside local election result 2004
Party	Seats	Gains	Losses	Net gain/loss	Seats %	Votes %	Votes	+/−
Labour	35			-14	64.8	45.5	49,457	-3.5%
Independent	6			+4	11.1	11.2	12,220	+2.2%
Progressive	6			+3	11.1	10.9	11,829	+2.4%
Liberal Democrats	4			-1	7.4	16.6	18,022	-0.2%
Conservative	3			+2	5.6	14.5	15,783	-1.4%
BNP	0			0	0	0.8	889	+0.0%
Green	0			0	0	0.3	315	+0.3%
National Front	0			0	0	0.2	262	+0.2%

== Ward results ==
Beacon & Bents (3)
Party	Candidate	Votes	%	±%
Labour	John Wood	908		
Labour	Audrey McMillan	898		
Labour	John Anglin	863		
Liberal Democrats	Susan Troupe	569		
Liberal Democrats	Jennifer Burke	561		
Liberal Democrats	David Selby	542		
Independent	Robert Growcott	541		
Conservative	George Smith	447		
Conservative	Edward Russell	438		
Conservative	Christopher Taylor	394		
BNP	James Hills	371		
Green	Bryan Atkinson	315		
Turnout		6,847	41.7	

Bede (3)
Party	Candidate	Votes	%	±%
Labour	Thomas Hanson	1,118		
Labour	Agnes Stewart	1,089		
Independent	Thomas Defty	1,054		
Labour	Linda Waggott	929		
Conservative	Mary Golightly	367		
Turnout		4,557	38.9	

Biddick & All Saints (3)
Party	Candidate	Votes	%	±%
Labour	Joseph Kidd	986		
Liberal Democrats	William Troupe	845		
Labour	Stephen Forster	804		
Labour	Olive Punchion	738		
National Front	Charles Schmidt	262		
Turnout		3,635	32.6	

Boldon Colliery (3)
Party	Candidate	Votes	%	±%
Labour	Joanne Bell	1,404		
Labour	William Lynch	1,368		
Labour	Alison Strike	1,316		
Liberal Democrats	Frederick Taylor	860		
Liberal Democrats	Terence Branthwaite	806		
Conservative	Gerald Brebner	662		
Turnout		6,416	40.9	

Cleadon & East Boldon (3)
Party	Candidate	Votes	%	±%
Conservative	Philip Parkinson	1,649		
Conservative	Donald Wood	1,569		
Conservative	David Potts	1,500		
Liberal Democrats	Christopher Johnson	1,456		
Liberal Democrats	James Selby	1,177		
Liberal Democrats	Henry Grainger	1,176		
Labour	Mary Purvis	495		
Labour	David Wood	423		
Labour	Terence Fairley	414		
Turnout		9,859	51.6	

Cleadon Park (3)
Party	Candidate	Votes	%	±%
Labour	Alexander Donaldson	802		
Independent	George Elsom	761		
Labour	James Foreman	751		
Labour	Anne Walsh	732		
Progressive	Arthur Morton	718		
Progressive	John Williams	527		
Progressive	Gunther Keller	497		
Turnout		4,788	37.2	

Fellgate & Hedworth (3)
Party	Candidate	Votes	%	±%
Labour	Paul Waggott	1,116		
Labour	Moira Smith	1,071		
Labour	Edith Battye	1,011		
Conservative	Sandra Jackson	647		
Turnout		3,845	35.8	

Harton (3)
Party	Candidate	Votes	%	±%
Progressive	James Capstick	1,585		
Progressive	Gordon Finch	1,540		
Progressive	Lawrence Nolan	1,535		
Labour	Robert Dix	1,111		
Labour	Wilhelmina Moad	994		
Labour	Wallace Hobson	863		
Turnout		7,628	44.4	

Hebburn North (3)
Party	Candidate	Votes	%	±%
Liberal Democrats	Joseph Abbott	1,266		
Liberal Democrats	John McKie	1,230		
Liberal Democrats	Joseph Atkinson	1,131		
Labour	John Hodgson	916		
Labour	John Drynan	669		
Labour	Gladys Hobson	609		
Conservative	Stewart Jackson	159		
Turnout		5,980	38.9	

Hebburn South (3)
Party	Candidate	Votes	%	±%
Independent	John McCabe	1,678		
Labour	Henry McAtominey	1,113		
Labour	Nancy Maxwell	1,047		
Labour	John Watson	824		
Liberal Democrats	Constance Ridgway	776		
Liberal Democrats	Jeffrey Harling	618		
Conservative	John Coe	313		
Turnout		6,369	48.1	

Horsley Hill (3)
Party	Candidate	Votes	%	±%
Labour	Arthur Meeks	1,056		
Labour	Iain Malcolm	1,033		
Labour	Eileen Leask	908		
Conservative	Patricia Pigott	862		
Conservative	Martin Anderson	812		
Conservative	Cheryl Anderson	767		
Independent	Mervyn Owen	634		
Liberal Democrats	Yvonne Carlin-Page	465		
Liberal Democrats	Carol Selby	412		
BNP	Christine Richardson	287		
Turnout		7,236	47.2	

Monkton (3)
Party	Candidate	Votes	%	±%
Labour	Joan Lewis	984		
Labour	Alan Kerr	960		
Labour	James Sewell	929		
Liberal Democrats	Rosalind Slater	756		
Liberal Democrats	Sheila Bennett	666		
Liberal Democrats	Muriel Coe	624		
Conservative	John Cameron	425		
Independent	Derek Wagstaffe	351		
Independent	John Bissett	203		
Turnout		5,898	39.5	

Primrose (3)
Party	Candidate	Votes	%	±%
Labour	James Perry	1,065		
Labour	Barrie Scorer	1,036		
Labour	Emma Lewell-Buck	972		
Conservative	Walter Armstrong	634		
Turnout		3,707	34.0	

Simonside & Rekendyke (3)
Party	Candidate	Votes	%	±%
Labour	Edward Malcolm	1,004		
Labour	Michael Clare	915		
Labour	Joan Meeks	896		
Liberal Democrats	Jean Turner	609		
Progressive	Robert Burdon	556		
Progressive	David Maxwell	540		
Progressive	Raymond Evans	495		
Turnout		5,015	34.6	

West Park (3)
Party	Candidate	Votes	%	±%
Progressive	Enid Hetherington	1,315		
Progressive	Marjorie Robinson	1,279		
Progressive	Kenneth Hickman	1,242		
Labour	Scott Duffy	800		
Labour	Kenneth Stephenson	702		
Labour	Jane Carter	698		
Turnout		6,036	40.1	

Westoe (3)
Party	Candidate	Votes	%	±%
Independent	Allen Branley	1,561		
Independent	Jane Branley	1,488		
Labour	Ronald Reynolds	807		
Conservative	George Wilkinson	787		
Liberal Democrats	Derek Brown	751		
Conservative	Quintin Smith	651		
Conservative	Karl Arthur	612		
Labour	Henry Williams	544		
Labour	Thomas Pigott	536		
Turnout		7,737	47.8	

Whitburn & Marsden (3)
Party	Candidate	Votes	%	±%
Labour	Tracey Dixon	1,019		
Labour	Shirley Stratford	949		
Labour	Peter Boyack	897		
Independent	James Caine	726		
Liberal Democrats	Peter Carlin-Page	726		
Conservative	Jeffrey Milburn	683		
Conservative	John Fettis	642		
Conservative	Ralph Robson	623		
Turnout		6,265	45.5	

Whiteleas (3)
Party	Candidate	Votes	%	±%
Independent	John Haram	1,296		
Labour	Ernest Gibson	1,178		
Labour	William Brady	1,126		
Labour	Mavis Brady	1,061		
Independent	Joanne Burns	978		
Independent	Stephen Pattison	949		
BNP	David Richardson	231		
Conservative	Barbara Surtees	140		
Turnout		6,959	44.5	
