= South Shields Town Hall =

Municipal building in South Shields, Tyne and Wear, England

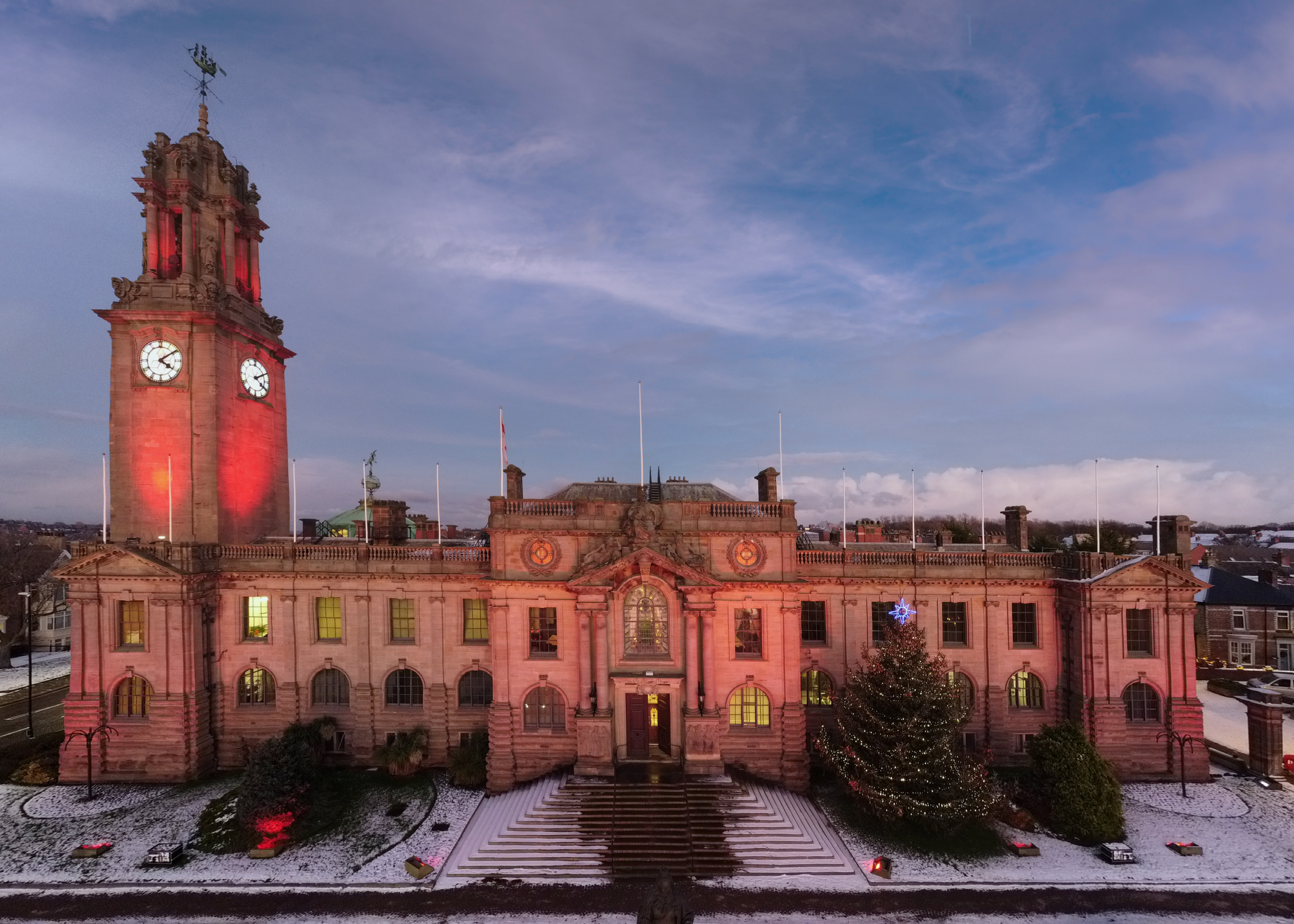
- South Shields Town Hall on 15 December 2022

- Shown in Tyne and Wear
- 54.9951°N 1.4289°W
- Location: South Shields

History
- Built: 1910

Site notes
- Architect: Ernest Fatch
- Architectural style: Edwardian Baroque style

Listed Building – Grade II
- Official name: Municipal Buildings
- Designated: 1 February 1983
- Reference no.: 1232325

South Shields Town Hall is a Grade II listed building on Westoe Road in South Shields, Tyne and Wear, England. It serves as the headquarters of South Tyneside Council.

== The old town hall ==
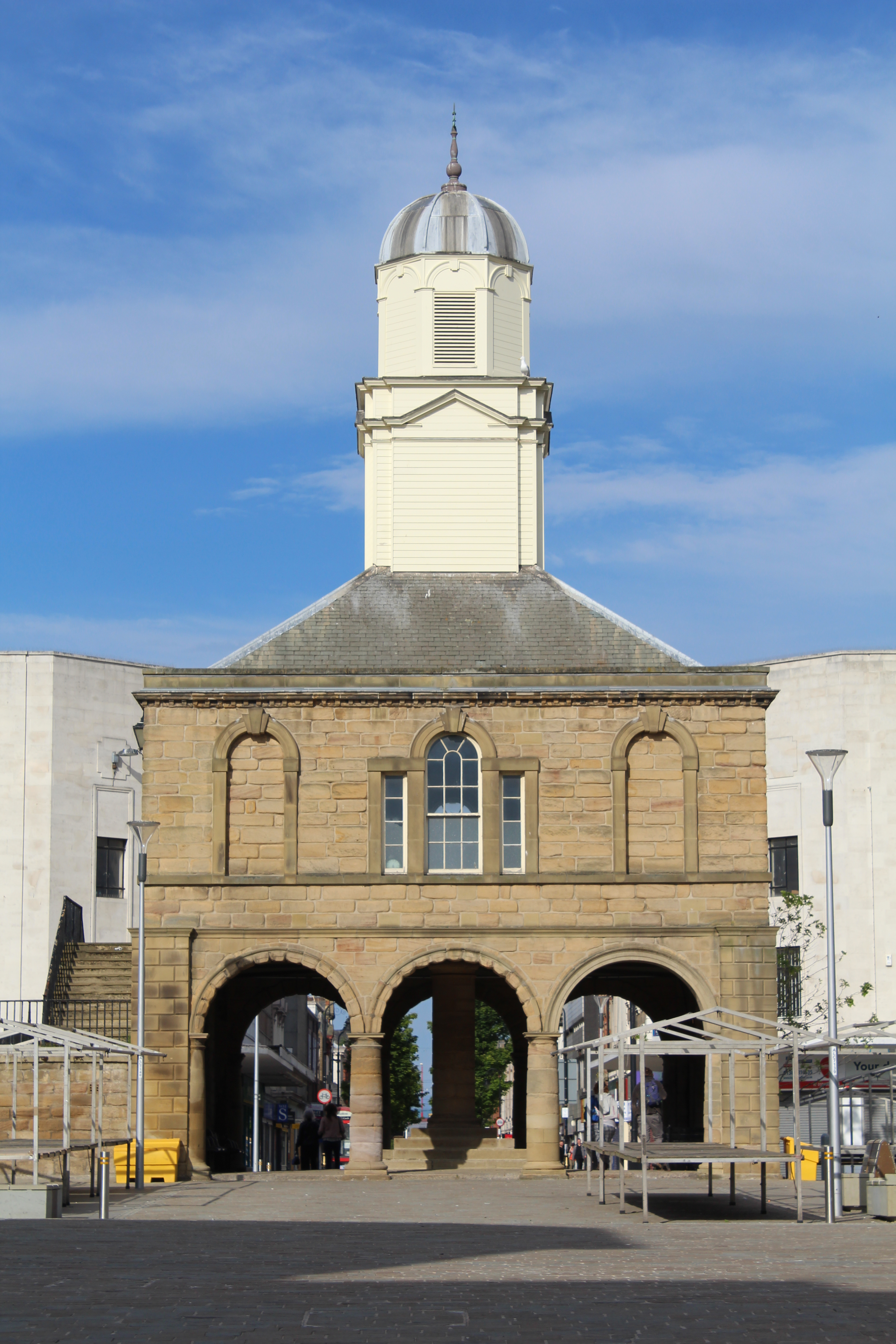
The old town hall

The first town hall in South Shields was commissioned as a manorial courthouse by the Dean and Chapter of Durham in the Market Place in 1768. The design included arcading on the ground floor to allow markets to be held, steps leading to a door on the first floor on the north side and Venetian windows on the first floor on the other sides. At roof level there is a square timber turret with a cupola. Following incorporation as a municipal borough in September 1850, the new civil leaders at South Shields Corporation acquired the building for use as a town hall in 1855. (Note: The old town hall incorporated a lock-up which was used for holding prisoners in the 19th century: it was the only building in the Market Place to survive the Blitz during the Second World War and it was fully refurbished in 1977.)

== The new town hall ==
It quickly became clear that the Old Town Hall, as it is known today, was unfit for purpose, and in 1869 a competition was held to create a new building on the site. Despite some designs being considered, this came to nothing amidst widespread local objections about the cost of the project and its use of the existing Marketplace location, which was deemed unsuitable for a larger building. The contractor appointed to the project, a Mr. Suffards, was paid the sum of £75 in compensation following its subsequent cancellation.

The idea of a new town hall then fell into abeyance until the 1880s, when the Old Town Hall was again deemed inadequate. The South Shields Corporation began considering potential locations as early as 1884, but it was not until the 1890s that civic leaders decided to procure new premises. The site selected was a piece of open land at the corner of Bent House Lane (later known as Beach Road) and Westoe Road. The foundation stone for the new building was laid in 1905. It was designed by Ernest Fatch in the Edwardian Baroque style, was built at a cost of £78,000 and was officially opened by the Mayor, George Thomas Grey, on 19 October 1910.

The design involved a symmetrical main frontage with thirteen bays facing onto Westoe Road with the end bays projected forward as pavilions; the central section of three bays, which also projected forward, featured a doorway with a stone surround on the ground floor, a round headed window on the first floor flanked by paired Ionic order columns with a broken pediment above. Above the pediment was a seated figure supported by two reclining figures. The architect installed a 46.6 meters (153 ft) high clock tower, with a belfry (with figures representing the four seasons of the year at the corners) and a copper galleon on top, which rose above the north pavilion. A main bell and four quarter bells were installed in the clock tower by Taylor of Loughborough, to play the Westminster Quarters; the clock, by Potts & Sons, was set going by a Mrs Gladys Willie at noon on 21 October 1908. A statue by Albert Toft depicting Queen Victoria was erected outside the town hall on 7 May 1913. (Note: The statue was moved to a new location within the town (a small garden on the corner of Laygate Lane and Dean Road occupying the site of the current Chichester Metro station) in 1949 but returned to its original site in 1981.)

Queen Elizabeth II, accompanied by the Duke of Edinburgh, visited the town hall on 29 October 1954. In order to provide additional office space, a modern extension along Beach Road was opened by the mayor, Alderman Jack Richardson, on 19 October 1960.

The building continued to serve as the headquarters of South Shields Borough Council and remained the local seat of government after the enlarged South Tyneside Council was formed in 1974. Statues by the sculptor, Roger Andrews, depicting Private Thomas Young VC and Lieutenant Richard Annand VC, who served with the Durham Light Infantry in the First World War and the Second World War respectively, were unveiled inside the town hall in May 2007.
