= Richard Annand =

Recipient of the Victoria Cross

Richard Annand VC
- Born: 5 November 1914; South Shields, County Durham, England
- Died: 24 December 2004 (aged 90); Whitesmocks, Durham, England
- Military career
- Allegiance: United Kingdom
- Branch: Royal Navy Volunteer Reserve; British Army
- Service years: 1933–1937 (Navy); 1938–1948 (Army)
- Rank: Sub-lieutenant (Navy); Captain (Army)
- Nickname: "Dicky"
- Service number: 74134
- Units: Durham Light Infantry
- Conflicts: Second World War
- Awards: Victoria Cross; Emergency Reserve Decoration and bar
- Other work: Deputy Lieutenant of County Durham

Captain Richard Wallace Annand (5 November 1914 – 24 December 2004) was an English recipient of the Victoria Cross, the highest and most prestigious award for gallantry in the face of the enemy that can be awarded to British and Commonwealth forces. This was the first VC awarded to a member of the British Army in the Second World War.

== Early life ==
Annand was born in South Shields, County Durham, England, and was the son of Lieutenant-Commander Wallace Moir Annand. His father was killed with the Collingwood Battalion of the Royal Naval Division at Gallipoli in June 1915. He was educated at Pocklington School, East Yorkshire. Upon leaving school he worked at the National Provincial Bank first at South Shields and then in Rugby and finally in London.

== Military career ==
In 1933, Annand joined the Tyne Division of the Royal Navy Volunteer Reserve as a midshipman. He was promoted to sub-lieutenant in 1936 and completed both a navigation and a gunnery course. In 1937 he applied for a commission in the Royal Navy but was refused because of his age.

Annand was commissioned into the Supplementary Reserve of Officers as a second lieutenant of the Durham Light Infantry on 29 January 1938.

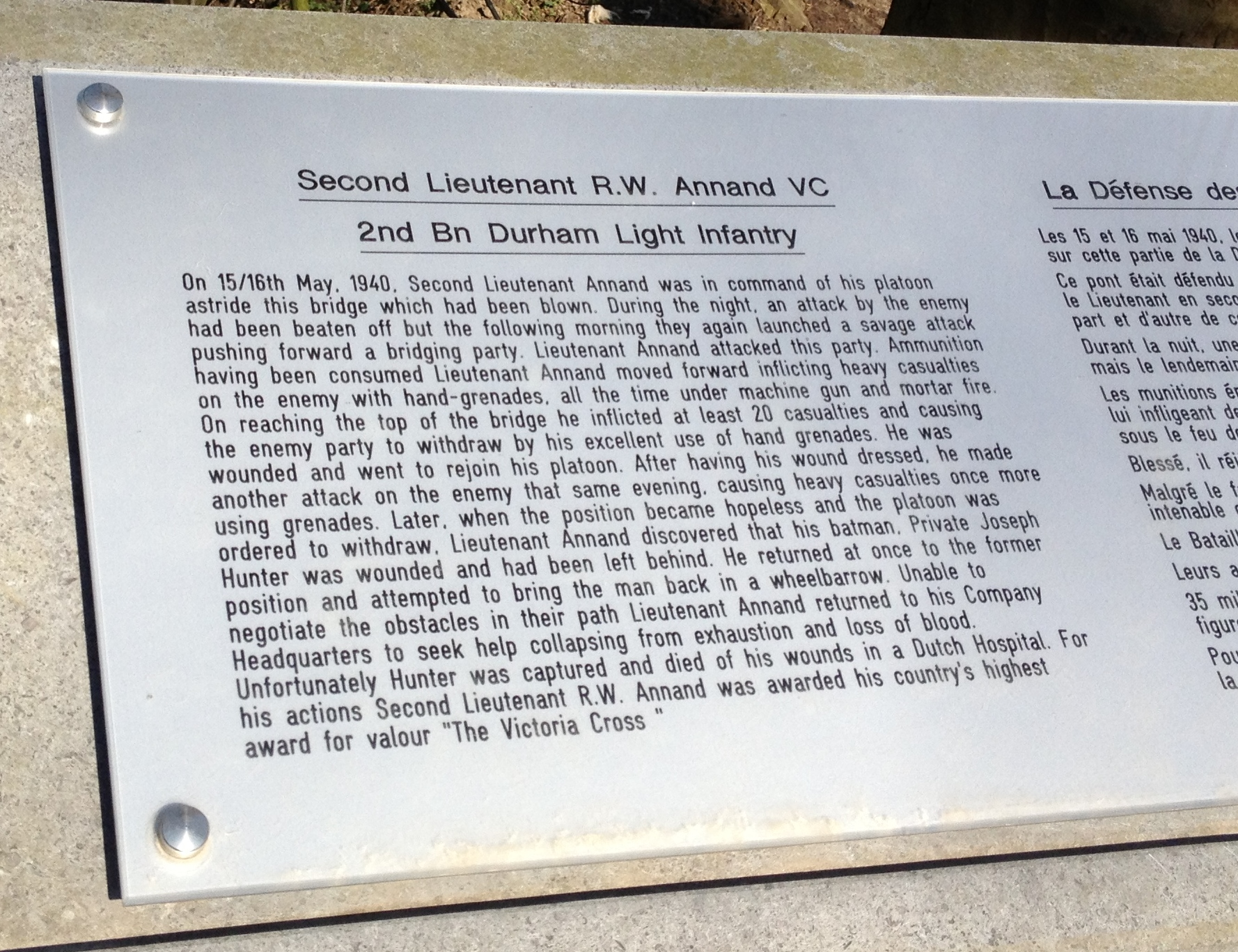
Plaque to Richard Annan on the bridge over the Dyle

=== Victoria Cross ===
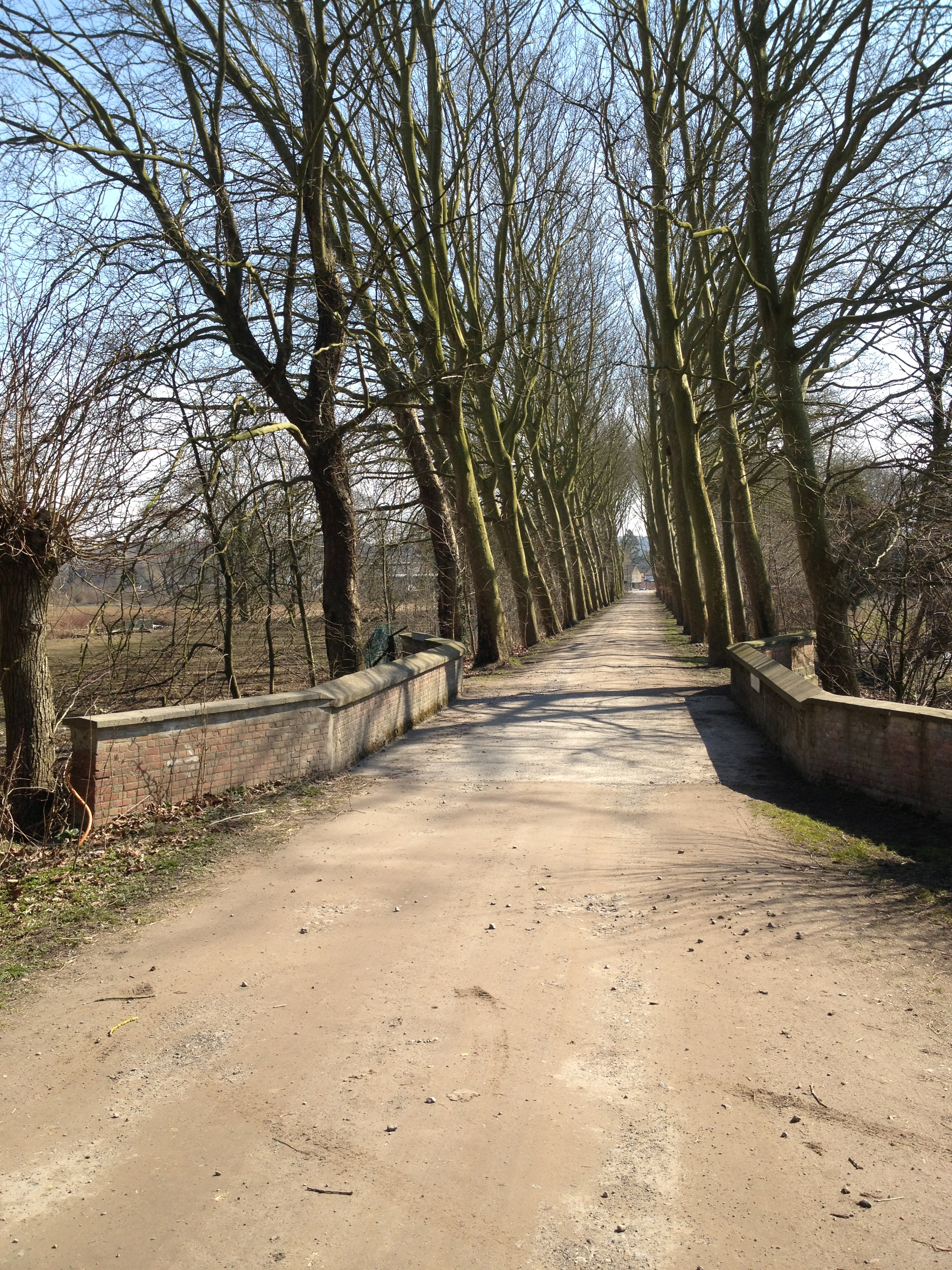
The Bridge over the Dyle

"Dickie" Annand was 25 years old, and a second lieutenant in the 2nd Battalion, the Durham Light Infantry, during Operation David when a deed took place on 15 May 1940, near the River Dyle, Gastuche, Belgium, for which he was awarded the VC. This was the first Victoria Cross awarded to a member of the British Army in the Second World War. He was invested with the Victoria Cross by King George VI at Buckingham Palace on 3 September 1940.

The citation concerning his Victoria Cross was published in The London Gazette in a supplement on 23 August 1940. It read as follows:

For most conspicuous gallantry on the 15th–16th May 1940, when the platoon under his command was on the south side of the River Dyle, astride a blown bridge. During the night a strong attack was beaten off, but about 11 a.m. the enemy again launched a violent attack and pushed forward a bridging party into the sunken bottom of the river. Second Lieutenant Annand attacked this party, but when ammunition ran out he went forward himself over open ground, with total disregard for enemy mortar and machine-gun fire. Reaching the top of the bridge, he drove out the party below, inflicting over twenty casualties with hand grenades. Having been wounded he rejoined his platoon, had his wound dressed, and then carried on in command.

Richard Annand's platoon sergeant said later "Mr Annand came to me at platoon headquarters and asked for a box of grenades as they could hear Jerry trying to repair the bridge. Off he went and he sure must have given them a lovely time because it wasn't a great while before he was back for more.

During the evening another attack was launched and again Second Lieutenant Annand went forward with hand grenades and inflicted heavy casualties on the enemy. When the order to withdraw was received, he withdrew his platoon, but learning on the way back that his batman was wounded and had been left behind, he returned at once to the former position and brought him back in a wheelbarrow, before losing consciousness as the result of wounds.

The batman Private Joseph Lakeman Hunter was captured and died of his wounds.

=== Later military career ===
As a result of his wounds, Annand was evacuated to England and he rejoined the re-formed battalion the following month. In June 1941, he lost what remained of his hearing as a result of rifle practice and was discharged from the 2nd Battalion. He spent much of the war as an instructor, including at the Commando Training Centre at Inverailort, Inverness-shire, and at the Highland Fieldcraft Centre in the Cairngorms.

He was promoted to captain on 28 January 1948. He relinquished his commission due to disability on 29 December 1948 but retained the rank of captain.

== Personal life ==
He married Shirley Osborne in 1940 and celebrated their Diamond Wedding anniversary on 9 November 2000. They did not have any children.

On 11 February 1956, Annand became a deputy lieutenant for the County of Durham.

Upon retirement from the military, and because of the injuries he sustained during the Second World War, Annand became involved in helping disabled people. He was a founder member of the British Association for the Hard of Hearing which became Hearing Concern in 1963, and was also involved in the founding of the Durham County Association for the Disabled.

Richard Annand died at Durham shortly after his 90th birthday on 24 December 2004.

== Legacy ==
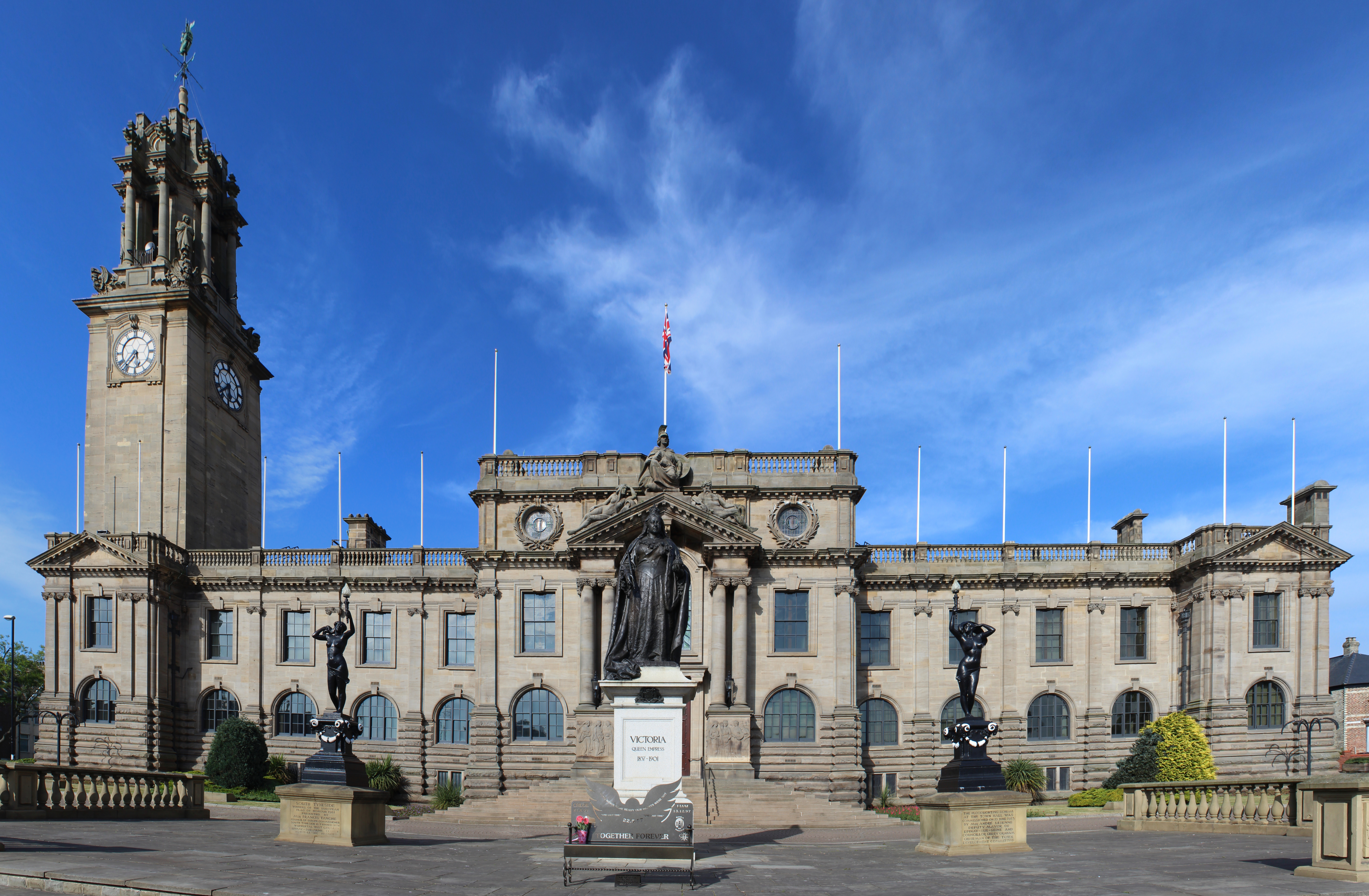
South Shields Town Hall

Statues by the sculptor Roger Andrews depicting Annand and Private Thomas Young VC, who served with the Durham Light Infantry in the First World War, were unveiled inside South Shields Town Hall in May 2007.

== Awards and decorations ==
Medal entitlement of Captain Richard Annand – 2nd Bn, Durham Light Infantry

- Victoria Cross
- 1939–1945 Star
- Defence Medal (1939–45)
- War Medal 1939–1945
- Queen Elizabeth II Coronation Medal (1953)
- Queen Elizabeth II Silver Jubilee Medal (1977)
- Queen Elizabeth II Golden Jubilee Medal (2002)
- Army Emergency Reserve Decoration and bar (1980)

== Bibliography ==
- British VCs of World War 2 (John Laffin, 1997)
- Monuments To Courage (David Harvey, 1999)
- Buzzell, Nora, ed. (1997). The Register of the Victoria Cross. Cheltenham, Gloucestershire: This England Alma House. ISBN 0-906324-27-0.
- Victoria Cross Society (Victoria Cross Society, 2004)
- Whitworth, Alan (2015). VCs of the North: Cumbria, Durham & Northumberland. Pen and Sword Books. ISBN 978-1473848221.
