= Thomas Young (VC) =

Victoria Cross recipient (1895–1966)

- Born: Thomas Morrell; 28 January 1895; Boldon, County Durham, England
- Died: 15 October 1966 (aged 71); Whickham, England
- Burial place: St Patrick's Cemetery, High Spen
- Military career
- Allegiance: United Kingdom
- Branch: British Army
- Service years: 1914−1921
- Rank: Sergeant
- Service number: 203590
- Units: Durham Light Infantry
- Conflicts: World War I
- Awards: Victoria Cross

Sergeant Thomas Young (born as Thomas Morrell) VC (28 January 1895 − 15 October 1966) was a British Army soldier and an English recipient of the Victoria Cross (VC), the highest and most prestigious award for gallantry in the face of the enemy that can be awarded to British and Commonwealth forces.

== Details ==
Thomas was from High Spen in what is now the Metropolitan Borough of Gateshead. He was 23 years old, and a private in the 9th Battalion, The Durham Light Infantry, British Army during the First World War when the following deed took place for which he was awarded the VC.

During the period 25/31 March 1918 at Bucquoy, France, Private Young, a stretcher-bearer, worked unceasingly evacuating the wounded from seemingly impossible places. On nine occasions he went out in front of British lines in broad daylight, under heavy rifle, machine-gun and shell fire and brought back wounded to safety. Those too badly wounded to be moved before dressing, he dressed under fire and then carried them back unaided. He saved nine lives in this manner.

A memorial to Thomas Young and Frederick William Dobson another VC recipient from High Spen was unveiled in July 2007 and can be seen in the grounds of High Spen primary school.

== Legacy ==
His VC was displayed at the Durham Light Infantry Museum & Durham Art Gallery in Durham City.

Statues by the sculptor, Roger Andrews, depicting Young and Lieutenant Richard Annand VC, who served with the Durham Light Infantry in the Second World War, were unveiled inside South Shields Town Hall in May 2007.

== Bibliography ==
- Gliddon, Gerald (2013) [2004]. Spring Offensive 1918. VCs of the First World War. The History Press. ISBN 978-0-7524-8730-4.
- Whitworth, Alan (2015). VCs of the North: Cumbria, Durham & Northumberland. Pen and Sword Books. ISBN 978-1473848221.
