= 2026 South Tyneside Council election =

2026 English local government election

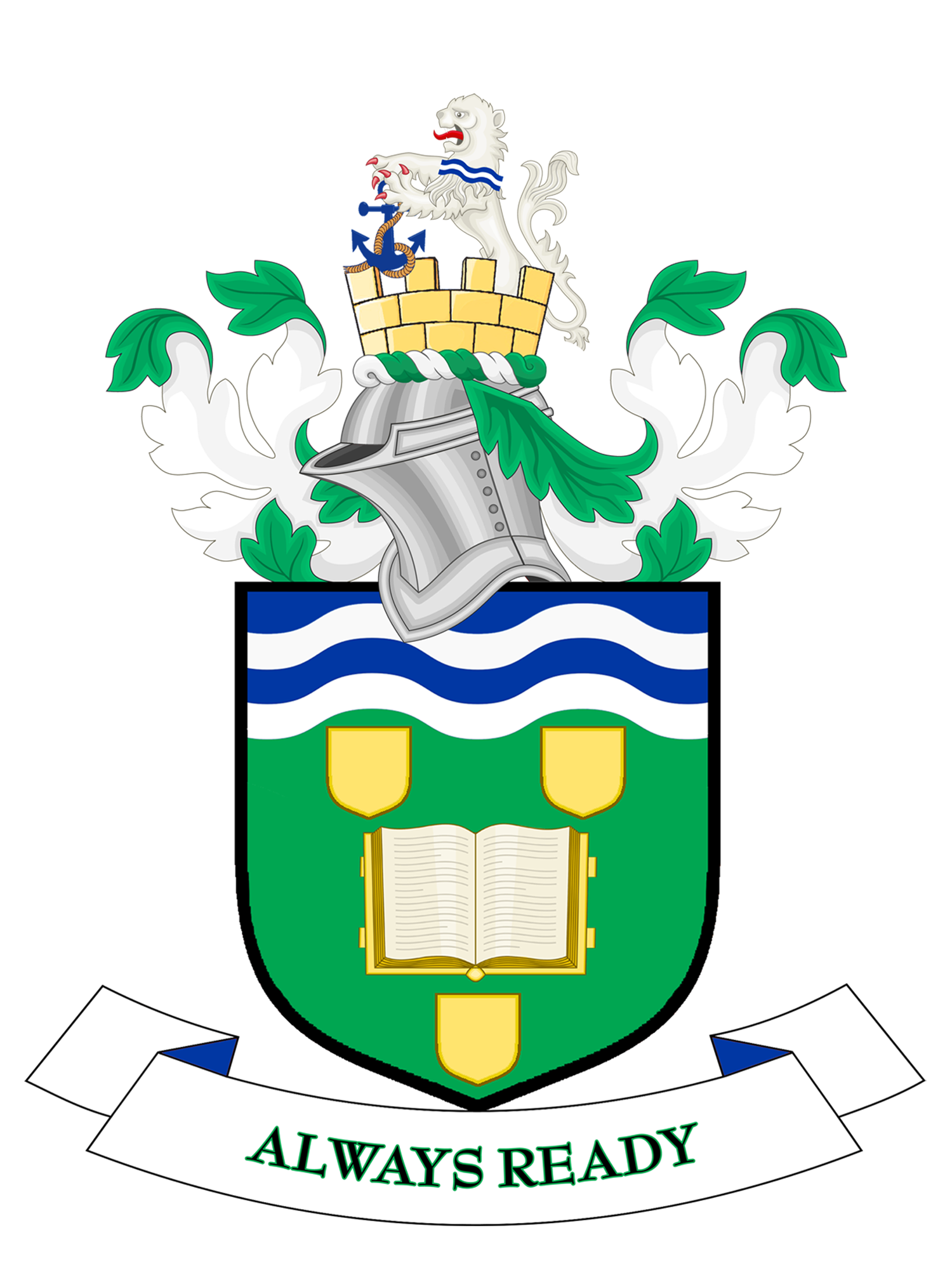
- 7 May 2026

All 54 seats to South Tyneside Council 28 seats needed for a majority
- Registered: 114,016
- Turnout: 49,993 (43.8%)
	First party	Second party
Leader	Paul Mackings	Rachael Taylor
Party	Reform	Green
Leader's seat	Whiteleas	Biddick and All Saints
Last election	0 seats, 1.8%	11 seats, 26.1%
Seats before	0	9
Seats won	41	10
Seat change	▲41	▲1
Popular vote	56,040	35,197
Percentage	39.9%	25.1%
Swing	▲38.1pp	▼1.0pp
	Third party	Fourth party
Leader		Tracey Dixon
Party	Independent	Labour
Leader's seat		Whitburn and Marsden
Last election	15 seats, 31.9%	28 seats, 35.5%
Seats before	18 (Note: Of the 18 Independent councillors before the election, 11 sat in the South Tyneside Alliance Group, 4 sat in The REAL Independent Councillors group, and 3 were non-aligned.)	27
Seats won	2	1
Seat change	▼16	▼26
Popular vote	20,288	26,476
Percentage	14.5%	18.9%
Swing	▼17.5pp	▼16.6pp
- Winner of each seat at the 2026 South Tyneside Metropolitan Borough Council election
Leader before election
Tracey Dixon
Labour
No overall control (Note: Labour minority.)
Leader after election
Paul Mackings
Reform

The 2026 South Tyneside Council election was held on 7 May 2026, alongside the other local elections across the United Kingdom being held on the same day. All 54 members of South Tyneside Council were elected. The election was held after boundary changes.

Prior to the election, the council was under no overall control. Labour was the largest party but was one seat short of a majority; it was running the council as a minority administration. At this election, Reform UK, which held no seats prior to the election, won 41 of the 54 seats on the council, giving it a significant majority. Labour was reduced to just one seat. The Labour councillors who lost their seats included the incumbent leader of the council, Tracey Dixon. There were also 10 Green Party councillors elected and two independents. Reform chose Paul Mackings as its new group leader after the election. He was formally appointed as the new leader of the council at the subsequent annual council meeting on 19 May 2026.

== Background ==
In 2024, Labour retained control of the council.

=== Council composition ===
After 2024 election		Before 2026 election	
Party	Seats	Party	Seats
Labour	28	Labour	27
Green	11	Green	9
Independent	15	Independent	18
Vacant	0	Reform	0

== Election result ==
Council composition after the 2024 election

Council composition after the 2026 election

2026 South Tyneside Metropolitan Borough Council election
Party	Candidates	Seats	Gains	Losses	Net gain/loss	Seats %	Votes %	Votes	+/−
Reform	54	41	41	0	▲41	75.9	39.9	56,040	+38.1
Green	54	10	2	1	▲1	18.5	25.1	35,197	–1.0
Independent	39	2	1	16	▼16	3.7	14.5	20,288	–17.5
Labour	54	1	0	27	▼26	1.9	18.9	26,476	–16.6
Conservative	12	0	0	0	Steady	0.0	1.3	1,783	–3.3
Liberal Democrats	2	0	0	0	Steady	0.0	0.4	588	N/A

== Ward results ==
=== Beacon and Bents ===
Beacon and Bents
Party	Candidate	Votes	%
Green	Rana Rahman	1,470	44.6
Green	Sue Stonehouse	1,324	40.2
Green	Sarah McKeown	1,275	38.7
Reform	Daniel Edward Stuart O'Neill	903	27.4
Reform	James Michael Stark	860	26.1
Reform	Edith Tye	841	25.5
Labour	Jabed Hossain	641	19.5
Independent	Ahmed Khan	526	16
Labour	Fay Cunningham	377	11.4
Independent	Mark Andrew Berriman	325	9.9
Independent	Scott Lancaster	291	8.8
Labour	Georgia Partridge	283	8.6
Conservative	Aaron Michael Cain	79	2.4
Turnout		3294	50.5
Green hold			
Green hold			
Green hold			

=== Bede ===
Bede
Party	Candidate	Votes	%
Reform	Michael Oughton	936	41
Reform	Chris Wears	901	39.4
Reform	Alan Rice	892	39
Independent	Keith Roberts	571	25
Independent	Terry Foggon	540	23.6
Independent	Donna Foggon	535	23.4
Labour	Stephen Dean	373	16.3
Green	John Chilton	364	15.9
Green	Lynne Saunders	360	15.8
Green	Tony Gair	355	15.5
Labour	Margaret Mary Peacock	297	13
Labour	Sean Anthony Stonehouse	269	11.8
Conservative	Mo Karim	62	2.7
Turnout		2285	38.6
Reform gain from Labour			
Reform gain from Independent			
Reform gain from Independent			

=== Biddick and All Saints ===
Biddick and All Saints
Party	Candidate	Votes	%
Reform	Steve Maddison	871	42.6
Reform	Steven Smith	843	41.2
Green	Rachael Taylor	825	40.3
Reform	Michelle Turnbull	806	39.4
Green	Chris Davies*	795	38.9
Green	Darius Seago	726	35.5
Labour	Katharine Maxwell	262	12.8
Labour	Alan Lawless	244	11.9
Labour	Martin Edward Lightfoot	231	11.3
Independent	Lee Theaker	158	7.7
Turnout		2045	33.2
Reform gain from Labour			
Reform gain from Green			
Green hold			

=== Boldon Colliery ===
Boldon Colliery
Party	Candidate	Votes	%
Reform	Ian Diamond	987	33.5
Independent	Simon Oliver	970	32.9
Reform	Chris Fox	947	32.2
Reform	Michael Girdlestone	878	29.8
Independent	Ethan Moffatt-Oliver	822	27.9
Labour	Alison Strike	806	27.4
Independent	John Lennox	748	25.4
Labour	Ruth Brown	480	16.3
Labour	Paul Freeman	438	14.9
Green	Peter Collins	325	11
Green	Ben Allison	300	10.2
Green	Mason Gilhespy	251	8.5
Liberal Democrats	Thomas Stradling	156	5.3
Turnout		2945	42.6
Reform gain from Labour			
Independent gain from Labour			
Reform gain from Independent			

=== Cleadon Park and Harton Moor ===
Cleadon Park and Harton Moor
Party	Candidate	Votes	%
Reform	Russell Clifton	938	41.1
Reform	Helen Louise Ross	921	40.3
Reform	Heidi Wildhirt	882	38.6
Independent	Steve Harrison	435	19
Independent	George Elsom	428	18.7
Green	Daniel Cook	406	17.8
Independent	Vicky Harrison	368	16.1
Green	Colin Noble	361	15.8
Labour	Ken Mitchell	351	15.4
Labour	Karen Wood	339	14.8
Green	Richard Pressling	334	14.6
Labour	Tariq Jaman	309	13.5
Independent	Justin Knight	306	13.4
Conservative	Lewis Bridgewood	155	6.8
Turnout		2284	40.6
Reform gain from Labour			
Reform gain from Labour			
Reform gain from Independent			

=== Cleadon Village and East Boldon ===
Cleadon Village and East Boldon
Party	Candidate	Votes	%
Green	David Herbert	1,614	40.7
Green	Shirley Ford	1,592	40.2
Green	Abbey Muquith	1,278	32.3
Reform	Dawn Wildhirt	1,226	30.9
Reform	Nick Markwick	1,190	30
Reform	Peter Atherton	1,051	26.5
Labour	Tina Lindsay Roche	581	14.7
Labour	John Robert Temple	563	14.2
Independent	Scott Oliver	528	13.3
Labour	Mervyn Carl William Owen	513	12.9
Conservative	Samuel Thomas Hill	492	12.4
Liberal Democrats	Phil Barron	432	10.9
Turnout		3962	55.8
Green hold			
Green hold			
Green hold			

=== Fellgate and Hedworth ===
Fellgate and Hedworth
Party	Candidate	Votes	%
Reform	Jean Murray	949	37.9
Labour	Geraldine Margaret Teresa Kilgour	924	36.9
Reform	Mal Bell	883	35.2
Reform	Katie Groom	875	34.9
Labour	Taz Ali	726	29
Labour	Nick Lamb	661	26.4
Independent	Tony Roberts	388	15.5
Independent	Kerry Redhead	378	15.1
Green	Melanie Maughan	289	11.5
Green	Pauline Stoker	254	10.1
Green	Badri Bechlem	250	10
Independent	Patrick Balmer	243	9.7
Conservative	Allan Michael Fitzgerald	89	3.6
Turnout		2507	43.7
Reform gain from Labour			
Labour hold			
Reform gain from Independent			

=== Harton ===
Harton
Party	Candidate	Votes	%
Reform	Shaun Barclay	1,171	42.6
Reform	Alex Robert Clarke	1,136	41.4
Reform	Jim Mouat	1,133	41.2
Independent	Karen Louise Myers	674	24.5
Independent	Ann Margaret Brenen	658	24
Independent	Pat Hay	559	20.3
Green	Michael Thomas Pittuck	530	19.3
Green	Declan Guiney	455	16.6
Green	Kathryn Kaupa	435	15.8
Labour	Neil Maxwell	413	15
Labour	Michael Henry Clare	391	14.2
Labour	Susan Traynor	381	13.9
Turnout		2747	43.6
Reform gain from Labour			
Reform gain from Labour			
Reform gain from Independent			

=== Hebburn North ===
Hebburn North
Party	Candidate	Votes	%
Reform	Andy Heywood	1,171	42.6
Reform	Mike Smith	1,101	40.1
Reform	Susan Sybenga	1,006	36.6
Labour	Stephen George Rutherford	790	28.7
Labour	Liz McHugh	742	27
Labour	Yvonne McShane	615	22.4
Independent	Brian Goodman	535	19.5
Green	George Currie	524	19.1
Green	John Riley	444	16.2
Green	Colin Tosh	411	15
Conservative	Richard George Scott	100	3.6
Turnout		2748	40.6
Reform gain from Labour			
Reform gain from Labour			
Reform gain from Labour			

=== Hebburn South ===
Hebburn South
Party	Candidate	Votes	%
Reform	Elliott Curry	1,387	43.4
Reform	Gary Elsender	1,372	42.9
Reform	Mark Francis Richardson	1,324	41.4
Green	Amy Andrews	700	21.9
Green	Annette Chapman	694	21.7
Green	Neil Newton	616	19.3
Labour	Angela Lamonte	597	18.7
Labour	Wilf Flynn	593	18.6
Labour	Jackie Griffin	590	18.5
Independent	Sean Halligan	484	15.1
Independent	Shane Andrew Smith	452	14.1
Conservative	Ayo Akin	164	5.1
Turnout		3195	46.0
Reform gain from Labour			
Reform gain from Independent			
Reform gain from Labour			

=== Horsley Hill and Westoe Crown ===
Horsley Hill and Westoe Crown
Party	Candidate	Votes	%
Reform	Charlie Medcalf	1,354	40.8
Reform	Pat Newman	1,319	39.7
Reform	Audrey Fenwick	1,293	39
Independent	Phil Brown	771	23.2
Green	Owen Batchelor	690	20.8
Independent	Gill Brown	627	18.9
Green	Darren Henry	615	18.5
Independent	Vicki Gardner	566	17.1
Green	Shamol Shahran	538	16.2
Labour	Eileen Leask	529	15.9
Labour	Dorothy Jane Grainger	448	13.5
Labour	Erin Maxwell	441	13.3
Conservative	Jason Stephen Carr	173	5.2
Turnout		3319	48.6
Reform gain from Labour			
Reform gain from Labour			
Reform gain from Independent			

=== Monkton ===
Monkton
Party	Candidate	Votes	%
Reform	Sheryl Jones	1,152	41.2
Reform	Matt Ling	1,120	40
Reform	Marian Elizabeth Stead	1,058	37.8
Labour	Emma Kate Corr	845	30.2
Labour	Paul Dean	767	27.4
Labour	John Watson	740	26.4
Green	Tony Easter	514	18.4
Green	Tracey Stephenson	477	17
Green	Kasia Parker	456	16.3
Independent	Graeme Slator	325	11.6
Independent	Rory Cunningham Page	249	8.9
Conservative	Sonia Teasdale-Banks	133	4.8
Turnout		2799	42.6
Reform gain from Labour			
Reform gain from Labour			
Reform gain from Labour			

=== Primrose ===
Primrose
Party	Candidate	Votes	%
Reform	Alex Barr	946	36.6
Reform	Adam Nicholas Smith	882	34.1
Reform	Elaine Cecilia Thomas	823	31.8
Independent	David Kennedy	653	25.3
Independent	Joan Hamilton	536	20.7
Independent	Karen Kennedy	532	20.6
Labour	Lindsey Brown	439	17
Labour	Adam James Naylor	431	16.7
Labour	Bob Farrell	429	16.6
Independent	John Andrew Robertson	383	14.8
Green	Lauren Bradley	354	13.7
Independent	Joanne McKie	319	12.3
Green	Andrew Lockney	288	11.1
Green	Stephen Wheeler	273	10.6
Conservative	Anita Ashbridge	93	3.6
Turnout		2585	38.9
Reform gain from Independent			
Reform gain from Independent			
Reform gain from Labour			

=== Simonside and Rekendyke ===
Simonside and Rekendyke
Party	Candidate	Votes	%
Reform	Luke Perry	959	36.7
Reform	Philip Charles Brown	955	36.6
Reform	Michelle Fascione	948	36.3
Green	Anthony Fenwick	799	30.6
Green	Sophia Malik	764	29.3
Green	Abdul Rob Mohammed	712	27.3
Independent	Kenneth George Wood	449	17.2
Labour	Edward Malcolm	437	16.7
Labour	Lynne Ann Proudlock	421	16.1
Labour	Mark Nellist	380	14.6
Independent	Jimmy King	345	13.2
Conservative	Adrian Thomas Cartwright	124	4.7
Turnout		2611	39.1
Reform gain from Labour			
Reform gain from Labour			
Reform gain from Independent			

=== West Park ===
West Park
Party	Candidate	Votes	%
Green	Tony Leather	1,193	46.3
Green	Matt Blair	1,185	46
Green	Jasim Uddin	1,093	42.4
Reform	Richard Saunders	1,009	39.2
Reform	Adam John Stevenson	956	37.1
Reform	Tom Veitch	913	35.5
Labour	Helen Hudson	351	13.6
Labour	Jeff Lazenby	337	13.1
Labour	Syed Shorif Ahmed	304	11.8
Turnout		2575	45.1
Green gain from Independent			
Green gain from Independent			
Green hold			

=== Westoe ===
Westoe
Party	Candidate	Votes	%
Independent	Kate Owens-Palmer	919	32.4
Reform	Sharlene May Tooley	909	32.1
Reform	Karen Pittuck	891	31.4
Independent	Paul Brenen	878	31
Independent	Andrew Guy	814	28.7
Reform	Abhinav Kumar	741	26.1
Green	Jordan Duncan	597	21.1
Green	Nathan Slight	555	19.6
Green	Noor Ahmed	542	19.1
Labour	Liam Walker	397	14
Labour	William Alan Jamieson	332	11.7
Labour	Tracey Windle	306	10.8
Conservative	Luke Andrew Robson	119	4.2
Turnout		2836	50.3
Independent hold			
Reform gain from Independent			
Reform gain from Independent			

=== Whitburn and Marsden ===
Whitburn and Marsden
Party	Candidate	Votes	%
Reform	Tony Humphrey	1,373	45.9
Reform	Steve Cain	1,324	44.2
Reform	David Royal	1,262	42.2
Green	Steve Lavelle	895	29.9
Green	Trevor Sewell	819	27.4
Labour	Tracey Allison Dixon	811	27.1
Green	Lewis Spence	787	26.3
Labour	Joyce Welsh	617	20.6
Labour	Anne Hetherington	582	19.4
Turnout		2993	51.1
Reform gain from Labour			
Reform gain from Labour			
Reform gain from Labour			

=== Whiteleas ===
Whiteleas
Party	Candidate	Votes	%
Reform	Chris Turnbull	1,195	52.8
Reform	Paul Mackings	1,159	51.2
Reform	Stan Wildhirt	1,118	49.4
Green	Lisa Cooley	535	23.6
Labour	Ernest Gibson	499	22.1
Green	Sophie-Jane Williams	490	21.7
Green	Phoenix Haynes	469	20.7
Labour	Ken Dawes	437	19.3
Labour	Doreen Purvis	416	18.4
Turnout		2263	37.2
Reform gain from Labour			
Reform gain from Labour			
Reform gain from Independent			

== Post-election changes ==
=== By-elections ===
==== Harton ====
Harton by-election: 6 August 2026 Resignation of Alex Clarke (Reform)
Party	Candidate	Votes	%	±%
Reform	Katie Groom	628	35.3	−6.7
Labour Co-op	Neil Maxwell	354	19.9	+5.1
Green	Kathryn Kaupa	312	17.5	−1.5
Independent	Karen Myers	285	16.0	−8.2
Independent	Phil Brown	119	6.7	N/A
Conservative	Sam Hill	57	3.2	N/A
Liberal Democrats	Mark Robson	24	1.3	N/A
Majority		274	15.4	N/A
Turnout		1,780	28.3	−15.3
Reform hold		Swing	▼5.9	
