= 2022 South Tyneside Metropolitan Borough Council election =

2022 UK local government election

Map of results

The 2022 South Tyneside Metropolitan Borough Council election took place on 5 May 2022 to elect members of South Tyneside Council. This was on the same day as other local elections. 19 of the 54 seats were up for election, with 1 ward (Harton) electing 2 councillors.

== Background ==
Since the first election in 1973, South Tyneside has always been under Labour control, aside from a brief period of no overall control from 1978 to 1979. In the 2021 election, Labour lost 4 seats with a vote share of 43.3%, independents gained 1 with 20.2%, the Green Party gained 2 with 13.8%, and the Conservatives gained their first seat since 2018 with 21.5% of the vote.

The seats up for election this year were last elected in 2018. In that election, Labour gained 1 seat with 57.3%, the Conservatives gained 1 seat with 22.9% of the vote, and the Green Party failed to make any further gains with 13.5%.

== Previous council composition ==
After 2021 election		Before 2022 election	
Party	Seats	Party	Seats
Labour	44	Labour	44
Conservative	1	Conservative	2
Green	3	Green	3
Independent	6	Independent	4

Changes:

- June 2021: John Robertson (independent) resigns from council
- July 2021: Jay Potts wins by-election for Labour from independent, Jeff Milburn (independent) disqualified from council
- September 2021: Stan Wildhirt wins by-election for Conservatives from independent
- February 2022: Rob Dix (Labour) dies; seat left vacant until May election

== Results ==
2022 South Tyneside Metropolitan Borough Council election
Party	This election			Full council			This election		
Party	Seats	Net	Seats %	Other	Total	Total %	Votes	Votes %	+/−
Labour	14	▼4	73.7	26	40	75.5	19,186	48.6	+5.3
Green	3	▲3	15.8	3	6	11.3	7,607	19.2	+5.4
Independent	2	▲2	10.5	4	6	11.3	6,408	16.2	-4.0
Conservative	0	▼1	0.0	1	1	1.9	6,145	15.5	-6.0
North East	0	Steady	0.0	0	0	0.0	172	0.4	N/A

== Results by ward ==
An asterisk indicates an incumbent councillor.

=== Beacon and Bents ===
Beacon and Bents
Party	Candidate	Votes	%	±%
Green	Sarah McKeown	1,346	54.6	+15.5
Labour	Fay Cunningham	848	34.4	−15.9
Conservative	Ali Hayder	165	6.7	−3.9
Independent	David Wood	106	4.3	N/A
Majority		498	20.2	+9.0
Turnout		2,474	36.0	
Green gain from Labour		Swing	▲15.7	

=== Bede ===
Bede
Party	Candidate	Votes	%	±%
Labour	Stephen Dean*	878	52.1	+12.4
Independent	Joanna Tuck	435	25.8	N/A
Conservative	Bill Smith	241	14.3	−7.2
Green	John Chilton	131	7.8	+1.0
Majority		443	26.3	
Turnout		1,690	28.9	
Labour hold		Swing	N/A	

=== Biddick and All Saints ===
Biddick and All Saints
Party	Candidate	Votes	%	±%
Labour	Katharine Maxwell	795	57.9	+8.1
Green	Rachael Milne	362	26.4	+15.3
Conservative	Mark Auton	215	15.7	−1.6
Majority		433	31.5	
Turnout		1,373	21.8	
Labour hold		Swing	▼3.6	

=== Boldon Colliery ===
Boldon Colliery
Party	Candidate	Votes	%	±%
Labour	Alison Strike*	1,396	55.2	+5.7
Independent	Simon Oliver	439	17.4	−5.0
Conservative	Donald Wood	366	14.5	−6.3
North East	Vincent Richardson	172	6.8	N/A
Green	Peter Collins	157	6.2	−1.0
Majority		957	37.8	
Turnout		2,533	35.4	
Labour hold		Swing	▲5.4	

=== Cleadon and East Boldon ===
Cleadon and East Boldon
Party	Candidate	Votes	%	±%
Green	David Herbert	1,267	36.2	+25.1
Conservative	Stan Wildhirt*	1,138	32.5	−16.1
Labour	Philip Toulson	1,095	31.3	−9.1
Majority		129	3.7	
Turnout		3,514	50.6	
Green gain from Conservative		Swing	▲20.6	

=== Cleadon Park ===
Cleadon Park
Party	Candidate	Votes	%	±%
Labour	Jim Foreman*	688	39.4	−2.1
Independent	Steven Harrison	414	23.7	N/A
Conservative	Chris Sanderson	392	22.4	−3.1
Green	John Riley	254	14.5	+1.1
Majority		274	15.7	
Turnout		1,757	30.6	
Labour hold		Swing	N/A	

=== Fellgate and Hedworth ===
Fellgate and Hedworth
Party	Candidate	Votes	%	±%
Labour	Geraldine Kilgour*	1,453	67.7	+13.4
Independent	Ian Diamond	363	16.9	N/A
Conservative	Anthony Spinks	165	7.7	−4.8
Green	Nicky Gynn	89	4.1	+1.1
Independent	David Morris	77	3.6	N/A
Majority		1,090	50.8	
Turnout		2,153	38.0	
Labour hold		Swing	N/A	

=== Harton ===
Harton (2 seats due to by-election)
Party	Candidate	Votes	%	±%
Labour	Michael Clare	853	38.7	+4.8
Labour	Neil Maxwell*	833	37.8	+3.9
Independent	Lawrence Nolan	814	36.9	+11.1
Conservative	Chloe Grant	721	32.7	+2.6
Green	Sophie-Jane Williams	471	21.4	+11.2
Turnout		2,205	33.7	
Labour hold		Swing		
Labour hold		Swing		

=== Hebburn North ===
Hebburn North
Party	Candidate	Votes	%	±%
Labour	Richie Porthouse*	1,396	72.0	+15.8
Green	Emmanuel Michael	275	14.2	+4.8
Conservative	Costi Dumitru	267	13.8	−2.6
Majority		1,121	57.8	
Turnout		1,953	28.1	
Labour hold		Swing	▲5.5	

=== Hebburn South ===
Hebburn South
Party	Candidate	Votes	%	±%
Labour	Angela Lamonte	1,405	60.2	+0.6
Independent	Brian Goodman	459	19.7	N/A
Conservative	Tia Sinclair	339	14.5	−3.9
Green	Colin Tosh	130	5.6	−1.7
Majority		946	40.5	
Turnout		2,338	32.2	
Labour hold		Swing	N/A	

=== Horsley Hill ===
Horsley Hill
Party	Candidate	Votes	%	±%
Labour	Eileen Leask*	1,126	47.8	+11.6
Conservative	Carl Duncan	424	18.0	−8.6
Independent	Phil Brown	398	16.9	N/A
Green	Carrie Richardson	311	13.2	−2.0
Independent	Gary Bryant	98	4.2	N/A
Majority		702	29.8	
Turnout		2,362	35.1	
Labour hold		Swing	▲10.1	

=== Monkton ===
Monkton
Party	Candidate	Votes	%	±%
Labour	Paul Dean	1,190	59.2	+11.8
Conservative	Simon Salloway	332	16.5	+3.0
Independent	Marian Stead	293	14.6	N/A
Green	Rhiannon Curtis	195	9.7	+0.9
Majority		858	42.7	
Turnout		2,011	31.3	
Labour hold		Swing	▲4.4	

=== Primrose ===
Primrose
Party	Candidate	Votes	%	±%
Independent	John Robertson	875	47.2	N/A
Labour	Moira Smith*	746	40.3	+3.4
Conservative	Margaret Snowling	153	8.3	−7.0
Green	Kevin Alderson	79	4.3	−0.6
Majority		129	6.9	
Turnout		1,856	30.5	
Independent gain from Labour		Swing	N/A	

=== Simonside and Rekendyke ===
Simonside and Rekendyke
Party	Candidate	Votes	%	±%
Labour	Lynne Proudlock*	868	46.0	−0.9
Green	Leyla Al-Sayadi	622	32.9	+22.4
Conservative	Craig Slater	224	11.9	−5.6
Independent	Julie Angell	174	9.2	N/A
Majority		246	13.1	
Turnout		1,894	29.8	
Labour hold		Swing	▼11.7	

=== West Park ===
West Park
Party	Candidate	Votes	%	±%
Green	Andrew Guy	1,054	57.0	+47.5
Labour	Masuda Rahman	571	30.9	−14.1
Conservative	Moyra Day	223	12.1	−11.9
Majority		483	26.1	
Turnout		1,854	34.5	
Green gain from Labour		Swing	▲30.8	

=== Westoe ===
Westoe
Party	Candidate	Votes	%	±%
Independent	Paul Brenen	949	41.5	+12.0
Labour	Michelle Turnbull	921	40.3	+1.8
Green	Georgie Holt	322	14.1	+4.3
Independent	Nigel Reedman	94	4.1	N/A
Majority		28	1.2	
Turnout		2,298	37.8	
Independent gain from Labour		Swing	▲5.1	

=== Whitburn and Marsden ===
Whitburn and Marsden
Party	Candidate	Votes	%	±%
Labour	Jane Carter	1,183	57.5	+0.7
Conservative	Dawn Wildhirt	532	25.9	−0.1
Green	Rachel Lowe	342	16.6	+5.3
Majority		651	31.6	
Turnout		2,068	35.4	
Labour hold		Swing	▲0.4	

=== Whiteleas ===
Whiteleas
Party	Candidate	Votes	%	±%
Labour	Ken Dawes	941	52.0	+6.0
Independent	Kenneth Wood	420	23.2	N/A
Conservative	Heidi Wildhirt	248	13.7	−4.4
Green	Bethany Telford	200	11.1	+1.6
Majority		521	28.8	
Turnout		1,815	29.2	
Labour hold		Swing	N/A	
