= 2015 South Tyneside Metropolitan Borough Council election =

2015 local election in England

Map of results

The 2015 South Tyneside Metropolitan Borough Council election was held 7 May 2015 to elect members of South Tyneside Metropolitan Borough Council in England. This was on the same day as other local elections.

== Results by electoral ward ==
=== Beacon & Bents ward ===
Beacon & Bents
Party	Candidate	Votes	%	±%
Labour	Audrey McMillan	2,241	58.4	+17.1
Conservative	Ali Hayder	819	21.4	+9.0
Green	Rhiannon Curtis	773	20.2	N/A
Majority		1,422	37.0	
Turnout		3,906	57.4	+17.2
Labour hold		Swing		

=== Bede ward ===
Bede
Party	Candidate	Votes	%	±%
Labour	Fay Cunningham	1,847	57.2	+1.5
UKIP	Anita Campbell	720	22.3	N/A
Conservative	Mary Golightly	319	9.9	+4.6
Independent	Alan Raine	221	6.8	N/A
Green	Tony Gair	123	3.8	−0.3
Majority		1,127	34.9	
Turnout		3,243	54.2	+18.8
Labour hold		Swing		

=== Biddick & All Saints ward ===
Biddick & All Saints
Party	Candidate	Votes	%	±%
Labour	Joe Amar	1,915	62.1	−0.4
UKIP	Kenneth Taylor	759	24.6	N/A
Conservative	Elizabeth Turnbull	319	8.2	+1.8
Green	Dave Herbert	160	5.2	N/A
Majority		1,156	37.5	
Turnout		3,094	48.1	+15.8
Labour hold		Swing		

=== Boldon Colliery ward ===
Boldon Colliery
Party	Candidate	Votes	%	±%
Labour	Sandra Duncan	2,440	57.4	+5.6
Conservative	Ian Armstrong	1,111	26.1	+15.0
Green	Colin Tosh	700	16.5	N/A
Majority		1,329	31.3	
Turnout		4,285	58.5	+18.6
Labour hold		Swing		

=== Cleadon & East Boldon ward ===
Cleadon & East Boldon
Party	Candidate	Votes	%	±%
Labour	Joan Atkinson	2,631	52.0	+1.8
Conservative	Fiona Milburn	2,043	40.4	−0.9
Green	Philip Berry	383	7.6	N/A
Majority		588	11.6	
Turnout		5,077	72.9	+17.7
Labour hold		Swing		

=== Cleadon Park ward ===
Cleadon Park
Party	Candidate	Votes	%	±%
Labour	Susan Traynor	1,801	56.6	+17.7
Conservative	Brian Gilchrist	923	29.0	+21.0
Green	Steven Laval	458	14.4	N/A
Majority		878	27.6	
Turnout		5,077	72.9	+17.7
Labour gain from Independent		Swing		

=== Fellgate & Hedworth ward ===
Fellgate & Hedworth
Party	Candidate	Votes	%	±%
Labour	Audrey Huntley	2,042	57.1	+13.5
UKIP	Linda Hemmer	1,075	30.0	−18.9
Conservative	James Milburn	329	9.2	+4.7
Green	Lesley Hanson	131	3.7	N/A
Majority		967	27.1	
Turnout		3,583	61.4	+19.0
Labour gain from Independent		Swing		

=== Harton ward ===
Harton
Party	Candidate	Votes	%	±%
Labour	Rob Dix	2,048	50.0	−3.0
UKIP	Henry Pearce	1,060	25.9	N/A
Conservative	Craig Robinson	698	17.0	+5.6
Green	Brian Paget	292	7.1	N/A
Majority		988	24.1	
Turnout		4,112	61.2	+19.5
Labour hold		Swing		

=== Hebburn North ward ===
Hebburn North
Party	Candidate	Votes	%	±%
Labour	Adam Ellison	1,950	50.3	−4.4
Independent	Joe Abbott	1,159	29.9	N/A
Conservative	Amy-Jane Milburn	354	9.1	−2.6
Green	Matthew Giles	222	5.7	N/A
Independent	Ian Harkus	191	4.9	−49.8
Majority		791	20.4	
Turnout		3,895	57.0	+21.3
Labour hold		Swing		

=== Hebburn South ward ===
Hebburn South
Party	Candidate	Votes	%	±%
Labour	Wilf Flynn	2,215	57.5	−21.4
UKIP	Vikki Lawlor	891	23.1	N/A
Conservative	Jack Gibbons	445	11.5	−9.6
Green	James Cunningham	304	7.9	N/A
Majority		1,324	34.4	
Turnout		3,864	63.4	+20.7
Labour hold		Swing		

=== Horsley Hill ward ===
Horsley Hill
Party	Candidate	Votes	%	±%
Labour	Iain Malcolm	2,205	50.2	−4.1
UKIP	Geraldine White	971	22.1	N/A
Conservative	Marilyn Huartt	319	15.9	+3.8
Green	Angela Curtis	264	6.0	N/A
Independent	David Wood	252	5.7	+3.2
Majority		1,234	28.1	
Turnout		4,396	62.0	+16.7
Labour hold		Swing		

=== Monkton ward ===
Monkton
Party	Candidate	Votes	%	±%
Labour	Alan Kerr	2,156	57.6	+2.4
UKIP	Steven Harrison	910	24.3	N/A
Conservative	Oliver Wallhead	413	11.0	+2.8
Green	Helen Milburn	264	7.1	N/A
Majority		1,246	33.3	
Turnout		3,757	59.9	+22.0
Labour hold		Swing		

=== Primrose ward ===
Primrose
Party	Candidate	Votes	%	±%
Labour	Ken Stephenson	1,923	58.3	+5.3
UKIP	John Clarke	870	26.4	N/A
Conservative	David Fettis	326	9.9	+2.4
Green	Robert Reay	182	5.5	N/A
Majority		1,053	31.9	
Turnout		3,318	52.8	+17.7
Labour hold		Swing		

=== Simonside & Rekendyke ward ===
Simonside & Rekendyke
Party	Candidate	Votes	%	±%
Labour	Michael Clare	2,271	68.8	+2.5
Conservative	Stan Wallace	525	15.9	+6.0
Green	David Ridley	505	15.3	+6.5
Majority		1,745	52.9	
Turnout		3,347	52.8	+20.3
Labour hold		Swing		

=== West Park ward ===
West Park
Party	Candidate	Votes	%	±%
Labour	Anne Hetherington	1,508	45.5	−0.6
UKIP	Stephen Dagg	952	28.7	N/A
Conservative	Anthony Dailly	559	16.9	+3.0
Green	David Francis	295	8.9	+2.9
Majority		556	16.8	
Turnout		3,326	59.9	+23.6
Labour hold		Swing		

=== Westoe ward ===
Westoe
Party	Candidate	Votes	%	±%
Labour	Katharine Maxwell	1,786	47.6	+11.9
UKIP	Malcolm Pratt	804	21.4	N/A
Conservative	Eddy Russell	743	19.8	+8.2
Green	Tony Bengtsson	418	11.1	+5.3
Majority		982	26.2	
Turnout		3,769	60.7	+19.3
Labour gain from Independent		Swing		

=== Whitburn & Marsden ward ===
Whitburn & Marsden
Party	Candidate	Votes	%	±%
Labour	Joyce Welsh	1,703	46.1	−21.1
UKIP	Charles McKenzie-Smith	911	24.6	N/A
Conservative	Richard Gosling	807	21.8	−11.0
Green	Colette Hume	275	7.4	N/A
Majority		792	21.5	
Turnout		3,706	64.0	+21.3
Labour hold		Swing		

=== Whiteleas ward ===
Whiteleas
Party	Candidate	Votes	%	±%
Labour	Ernest Gibson	2,471	70.6	+7.7
Conservative	Dennis Maccoy	622	17.8	+10.4
Green	Malcolm Giles	407	11.6	N/A
Majority		1,849	52.8	
Turnout		3,538	54.4	+17.2
Labour hold		Swing		
