= 2008 South Tyneside Metropolitan Borough Council election =

2008 UK local government election

Results of the 2008 South Tyneside Council election

Elections to South Tyneside Metropolitan Borough Council were held on 1 May 2008.

After the election, the composition of the council was:

- Labour 31
- Independent 12
- South Tyneside Progressive 5
- Liberal Democrat 3
- Conservative 3

== Results summary ==
2008 South Tyneside Metropolitan Borough Council election
Party	This election			Full council			This election		
Party	Seats	Net	Seats %	Other	Total	Total %	Votes	Votes %	+/−
Labour	8	▼3	44.4	23	31	57.4	16,785	37.4	
Independent	6	▲3	33.3	6	12	22.2	11,340	25.2	
Conservative	1	Steady	5.6	2	3	5.6	7,164	15.9	
BNP	0	Steady	0.0	0	0	0.0	4,139	9.2	
Progressives	2	Steady	11.1	3	5	9.3	2,605	5.8	
Liberal Democrats	1	Steady	5.6	2	3	5.6	2,258	5.0	
Green	0	Steady	0.0	0	0	0.0	628	1.4	

== See also ==
- South Tyneside local elections
