= 2021 South Tyneside Metropolitan Borough Council election =

2021 UK local government election

Map showing the results of the 2021 South Tyneside Metropolitan Borough Council election

The 2021 South Tyneside Council election took place on 6 May 2021 to elect members of South Tyneside Council in England. This was on the same day as other local elections. One-third of the seats were up for election. The previous election in the area was in 2019.

== Results ==
2021 South Tyneside Metropolitan Borough Council election
Party	This election				Full council			This election		
Party	Candidates	Seats	Net	Seats %	Other	Total	Total %	Votes	Votes %	+/−
Labour	{{{candidates}}}	16	▼4	80.0	28	44	81.5	19,238	43.3	+1.4
Independent	{{{candidates}}}	1	▲1	5.0	5	6	11.1	8,999	20.2	+3.5
Green	{{{candidates}}}	2	▲2	10.0	1	3	5.6	6,124	13.8	-4.6
Conservative	{{{candidates}}}	1	▲1	5.0	0	1	1.9	9,576	21.5	+8.5
SDP	{{{candidates}}}	0	Steady	0.0	0	0	0.0	354	0.8	New
Reform	{{{candidates}}}	0	Steady	0.0	0	0	0.0	153	0.3	New

== Ward results ==
=== Beacon and Bents ===
Beacon and Bents
Party	Candidate	Votes	%	±%
Green	Sue Stonehouse	1,282	46.5	+34.1
Labour	Fay Cunningham	781	28.3	−28.8
Independent	Ahmed Khan	467	16.9	+16.9
Conservative	Ali Hayder	229	8.3	−1.3
Majority		501	18.2	N/A
Green gain from Labour		Swing		

=== Bede ===
Bede
Party	Candidate	Votes	%	±%
Labour	Margaret Peacock	715	39.7	−16.7
Independent	Shaun Sadler	577	32.0	+0.4
Conservative	Bill Smith	387	21.5	+15.2
Green	John Chilton	122	6.8	+1.1
Majority		138		
Labour hold		Swing		

=== Biddick and All Saints ===
Biddick and All Saints
Party	Candidate	Votes	%	±%
Labour	Anne Walsh	794	49.8	−12.0
Independent	Patricia Oliver	346	21.7	+21.7
Conservative	Jack White	276	17.3	+12.1
Green	Bethany Telford	177	11.1	+2.5
Majority		448		
Labour hold		Swing		

=== Boldon Colliery ===
Boldon Colliery
Party	Candidate	Votes	%	±%
Labour	Joanne Bell	1,336	49.5	−16.2
Independent	Simon Oliver	605	22.4	+22.4
Conservative	Anthony Spinks	561	20.8	−0.1
Green	Peter Collins	195	7.2	−6.1
Majority		731		
Labour hold		Swing		

=== Cleadon and East Boldon ===
Cleadon and East Boldon
Party	Candidate	Votes	%	±%
Conservative	Ian Forster	1,673	48.0	+3.2
Labour	Jane Carter	1,300	37.3	−8.6
Green	David Herbert	450	12.9	+3.6
Reform	Daniel Fisher	63	1.8	+1.8
Majority		373	10.7	N/A
Conservative gain from Labour		Swing		

=== Cleadon Park ===
Cleadon Park
Party	Candidate	Votes	%	±%
Labour	Alex Donaldson	752	41.5	
Conservative	Gary Thoburn	462	25.5	
Green	John Riley	243	13.4	
Independent	George Elsom	242	13.3	
Independent	Ian Campbell	114	6.3	
Majority		290		
Labour hold		Swing		

=== Fellgate and Hedworth ===
Fellgate and Hedworth
Party	Candidate	Votes	%	±%
Labour	Audrey Fay	1,264	54.3	+14.8
Independent	John Cullen	643	27.6	N/A
Conservative	Holly Wright	290	12.5	+8.1
Green	Kelly Hill	69	3.0	N/A
Independent	Paul D'Ambrosie	61	2.6	N/A
Majority		621		
Labour hold		Swing		

=== Harton ===
Harton
Party	Candidate	Votes	%	±%
Labour	Pat Hay	801	33.9	−14.5
Conservative	Chloe Grant	710	30.1	+13.7
Independent	Lawrence Nolan	610	25.8	+13.5
Green	Sarah Drummond	241	10.2	+10.2
Majority		91		
Labour hold		Swing		

=== Hebburn North ===
Hebburn North
Party	Candidate	Votes	%	±%
Labour	Liz McHugh	1,202	56.2	
Independent	Brian Goodman	384	17.9	
Conservative	Margaret Robson	352	16.4	
Green	Sian Ford	202	9.4	
Majority		850		
Labour hold		Swing		

=== Hebburn South ===
Hebburn South
Party	Candidate	Votes	%	±%
Labour	John McCabe	1,437	59.6	
Conservative	Moyra Day	444	18.4	
SDP	Mark Conway	354	14.7	
Green	Colin Tosh	175	7.3	
Majority		993		
Labour hold		Swing		

=== Horsley Hill ===
Horsley Hill
Party	Candidate	Votes	%	±%
Labour	Mark Walsh	888	34.8	
Labour	Ruth Berkley	887	34.7	
Conservative	Ethan Thoburn	653	25.6	
Independent	Phil Brown	542	21.2	
Conservative	Tia Sinclair	529	20.7	
Green	Jack Ford	372	14.6	
Green	Andrew Guy	239	9.4	
Independent	Angie Fisher	168	6.6	
Independent	Oliver Wallhead	161	6.3	
Independent	David Morris	157	6.1	
Majority				
Labour hold		Swing		
Labour hold		Swing		

=== Monkton ===
Monkton
Party	Candidate	Votes	%	±%
Labour	Joan Keegan	1,022	45.9	
Labour	Margaret Meling	707	31.8	
Independent	Graeme Slator	655	29.4	
Independent	Peter Hamilton	640	28.8	
Conservative	Chris Smith	292	13.1	
Conservative	Margaret Snowling	252	11.3	
Green	Rhiannon Curtis	189	8.5	
Reform	Marian Stead	90	4.0	
Majority				
Labour hold		Swing		
Labour hold		Swing		

=== Primrose ===
Primrose
Party	Candidate	Votes	%	±%
Independent	David Kennedy	793	42.9	
Labour	Ken Stephenson	683	36.9	
Conservative	Walter Armstrong	283	15.3	
Green	Kevin Alderson	91	4.9	
Majority		110		
Independent gain from Labour		Swing		

=== Simonside and Rekendyke ===
Simonside and Rekendyke
Party	Candidate	Votes	%	±%
Labour	Edward Malcolm	927	46.9	
Independent	Kenneth Wood	352	17.8	
Conservative	Christopher Sanderson	345	17.5	
Green	Sarah McKeown	207	10.5	
Independent	David Wood	146	7.4	
Majority		582		
Labour hold		Swing		

=== West Park ===
West Park
Party	Candidate	Votes	%	±%
Green	Peter Bristow	1,036	51.2	
Labour	Gladys Hobson	628	31.0	
Conservative	Mark Auton	360	17.8	
Majority		408		
Green gain from Labour		Swing		

=== Westoe ===
Westoe
Party	Candidate	Votes	%	±%
Labour	Ann Best	922	38.5	
Independent	Paul Brennen	707	29.5	
Conservative	Heidi Wildhirt	530	22.1	
Green	Anna-Louise Lambie	235	9.8	
Majority		215		
Labour hold		Swing		

=== Whitburn and Marsden ===
Whitburn and Marsden
Party	Candidate	Votes	%	±%
Labour	Tracey Dixon	1,337	56.8	
Conservative	Stan Wildhirt	612	26.0	
Green	Trevor Sewell	266	11.3	
Independent	Denis Burns	137	5.8	
Majority		725		
Labour hold		Swing		

=== Whiteleas ===
Whiteleas
Party	Candidate	Votes	%	±%
Labour	Doreen Purvis	855	46.0	
Independent	Blake Robson	372	20.0	
Conservative	Dawn Wildhirt	336	18.1	
Green	Rachael Milne	176	9.5	
Independent	Julie Angell	120	6.5	
Majority		483		
Labour hold		Swing		

== By-elections ==
=== Fellgate and Hedworth ===
Independent candidate John Robertson has previously been a councillor on South Tyneside council. In 2011, he deliberately drove a lorry into a council office building following a row over contracts. This resulted in over £160,000 in damage. He received 40 weeks in prison, was suspended from the council, and subsequently declared bankrupt.

The by-election was triggered by Robertson resigning. He was unsuccessful in attempting to retract his own resignation, so subsequently contested the by-election.

Fellgate and Hedworth: 29 July 2021
Party	Candidate	Votes	%	±%
Labour	Jay Potts	850	49.1	+9.6
Independent	John Robertson	555	32.0	−15.8
Conservative	Chris Smith	158	9.1	+4.7
Liberal Democrats	David Wilkinson	125	7.2	−1.0
Green	Kelly Hill	44	2.5	New
Majority		295	17.1	N/A
Turnout		1,738	30.6	
Labour gain from Independent		Swing	▲12.7	

=== Cleadon & East Boldon ===
Cleadon & East Boldon: 9 September 2021
Party	Candidate	Votes	%	±%
Conservative	Stan Wildhirt	989	35.1	−12.9
Green	David Herbert	943	33.5	+20.6
Labour	Philip Toulson	886	31.4	−5.9
Majority		46	1.6	
Turnout		2,823	40.7	
Conservative hold		Swing	▼16.8	
