= 2003 South Tyneside Metropolitan Borough Council election =

2003 UK local government election

The 2003 South Tyneside Metropolitan Borough Council election took place on 1 May 2003 to elect members of South Tyneside Metropolitan Borough Council in Tyne and Wear, England. One third of the council was up for election and the Labour Party kept overall control of the council.

After the election, the composition of the council was:

- Labour 49
- Liberal Democrat 5
- Progressives 3
- Independent 2
- Conservative 1

== Campaign ==
59 candidates stood in the election for the 20 seats that were being contested. Labour stood in all 20 seats, while the Conservatives had 14 candidates, Liberal Democrats 12, independents 7, Progressives 5 and the British National Party 1. As well as the postal voting that had been used in the 2002 election, South Tyneside was one of 4 councils which also trialed e-voting, enabling votes to be sent by phone, text message, email and be placed in special electronic voting kiosks.

Labour were guaranteed to keep a majority on the council whatever the results, but both the Liberal Democrats and the Progressives hoped to make gains in the election, while the Conservatives aimed to gain a presence on the council. Hebburn Quay was seen as being a key ward as the sitting Liberal Democrat councillor Catherine Tolson stood down at the election, and Labour had only been 20 votes from winning in 1999. Labour defended their record in power including regeneration and improving care for the elderly, however they were attacked for increasing council tax bills and for the closure of leisure facilities.

== Election result ==
At the count the results were delayed for over an hour after there was a problem with the electronic counting system. When the count was done, recounts were needed in both Cleadon and East Boldon and Whiteleas wards.

The results saw Labour keep a strong majority on the council despite losing 2 seats to independents in Hebburn South and Whiteleas wards. The Liberal Democrats managed to hold on to Hebburn Quay ward, but lost Cleadon and East Boldon to the Conservatives. The Conservative candidate in Cleadon and East Boldon, Donald Wood, won by 3 votes and thus became the first member of the party on the council since 1992. Overall turnout in the election was 46.11%.

South Tyneside local election result 2003
Party	Seats	Gains	Losses	Net gain/loss	Seats %	Votes %	Votes	+/−
Labour	15	0	2	-2	75.0	49.0	25,685	-3.5%
Independent	2	2	0	+2	10.0	9.0	4,747	+4.0%
Liberal Democrats	1	0	1	-1	5.0	16.8	8,811	-5.4%
Conservative	1	1	0	+1	5.0	15.9	8,351	+3.5%
South Tyneside Progressives	1	0	0	0	5.0	8.5	4,445	+0.7%
BNP	0	0	0	0	0	0.8	420	+0.8%

== Ward results ==
All Saints
Party	Candidate	Votes	%	±%
Labour	James Caine	1,096	50.8	−14.1
South Tyneside Progressives	Robert Burdon	1,063	49.2	+21.5
Majority		33	1.6	−35.6
Turnout		2,159	39.9	
Labour hold		Swing		

Beacon and Bents
Party	Candidate	Votes	%	±%
Labour	John Wood	1,349	51.3	−3.8
South Tyneside Progressives	Gordon Finch	602	22.9	−22.0
BNP	David Delaney	420	16.0	+16.0
Independent	William Mitcheson	261	9.9	+9.9
Majority		747	28.4	+18.2
Turnout		2,632	47.4	
Labour hold		Swing		

Bede
Party	Candidate	Votes	%	±%
Labour	Thomas Defty	1,381	67.7	−10.3
Liberal Democrats	Muriel Coe	464	22.7	+0.7
Conservative	Christopher Taylor	195	9.6	+9.6
Majority		917	45.0	−11.0
Turnout		2,040	40.7	
Labour hold		Swing		

Biddick Hall
Party	Candidate	Votes	%	±%
Labour	Linda Waggott	1,473	69.8	+6.3
Conservative	James Cain	636	30.2	+20.4
Majority		837	39.6	+2.8
Turnout		2,109	41.4	
Labour hold		Swing		

Boldon Colliery
Party	Candidate	Votes	%	±%
Labour	William Lynch	1,864	59.2	−8.3
Liberal Democrats	Frederick Taylor	675	21.4	+0.5
Conservative	Gerald Brebner	350	11.1	−0.4
Independent	Colin Campbell	262	8.3	+8.3
Majority		1,189	37.8	−8.8
Turnout		3,151	46.4	
Labour hold		Swing		

Cleadon and East Boldon
Party	Candidate	Votes	%	±%
Conservative	Donald Wood	1,570	41.0	+9.6
Liberal Democrats	Peter Carlin-Page	1,567	40.9	−6.6
Labour	David Wood	696	18.2	−2.9
Majority		3	0.1	
Turnout		3,833	52.9	
Conservative gain from Liberal Democrats		Swing		

Cleadon Park
Party	Candidate	Votes	%	±%
Labour	James Foreman	1,205	48.6	+2.9
Conservative	Martin Anderson	719	29.0	+29.0
Liberal Democrats	Alison Taylor	553	22.3	+2.7
Majority		486	19.6	+8.6
Turnout		2,477	44.8	
Labour hold		Swing		

Fellgate and Hedworth
Party	Candidate	Votes	%	±%
Labour	Paul Waggott	1,634	58.1	−9.1
Independent	George Waddle	835	29.7	+29.7
Conservative	Philip Parkinson	342	12.2	+0.6
Majority		799	28.4	−17.6
Turnout		2,811	44.0	
Labour hold		Swing		

Harton
Party	Candidate	Votes	%	±%
Labour	Robert Dix	1,156	43.5	−8.0
South Tyneside Progressives	Lawrence Nolan	632	23.8	+23.8
Liberal Democrats	Dorothy Grainger	445	16.8	−9.0
Conservative	Karl Arthur	423	15.9	−6.8
Majority		524	19.7	−6.0
Turnout		2,656	49.5	
Labour hold		Swing		

Hebburn Quay
Party	Candidate	Votes	%	±%
Liberal Democrats	Constance Ridgway	1,348	49.7	−8.5
Labour	John Hodgson	1,209	44.5	+2.7
Conservative	Stewart Jackson	157	5.8	+5.8
Majority		137	5.2	−11.2
Turnout		2,714	46.3	
Liberal Democrats hold		Swing		

Hebburn South
Party	Candidate	Votes	%	±%
Independent	John McCabe	1,175	49.6	+18.8
Labour	Thomas Bamford	988	41.7	−4.9
Conservative	John Coe	204	8.6	+2,4
Majority		187	7.9	
Turnout		2,367	50.7	
Independent gain from Labour		Swing		

Horsley Hill
Party	Candidate	Votes	%	±%
Labour	Arthur Meeks	1,418	46.2	−4.5
Conservative	Patricia Pigott	966	31.4	−5.4
Liberal Democrats	John Mortson	688	22.4	+9.9
Majority		452	14.8	+0.9
Turnout		3,072	51.6	
Labour hold		Swing		

Monkton
Party	Candidate	Votes	%	±%
Labour	James Sewell	1,478	56.6	−0.4
Liberal Democrats	Sheila Bennett	785	30.0	−2.0
Conservative	John Cameron	350	13.4	+2.4
Majority		693	26.6	+1.6
Turnout		2,613	42.2	
Labour hold		Swing		

Primrose
Party	Candidate	Votes	%	±%
Labour	James Perry	1,658	64.6	+4.6
Conservative	Walter Armstrong	594	23.1	+10.7
Independent	John Bissett	316	12.3	+12.3
Majority		1,064	41.5	+9.1
Turnout		2,568	41.0	
Labour hold		Swing		

Refendyke
Party	Candidate	Votes	%	±%
Labour	Scott Duffy	1,140	50.3	−6.1
Independent	Dorothy Golightly	500	22.1	+22.1
Liberal Democrats	Susan Troupe	395	17.4	−5.3
South Tyneside Progressives	Marjorie Robinson	230	10.2	−10.7
Majority		640	28.2	−5.5
Turnout		2,265	42.2	
Labour hold		Swing		

Tyne Dock and Simonside
Party	Candidate	Votes	%	±%
Labour	Edward Malcolm	1,202	64.6	+4.9
Liberal Democrats	Gary Ahmed	658	35.4	+8.7
Majority		544	29.2	−3.8
Turnout		1,860	43.4	
Labour hold		Swing		

West Park
Party	Candidate	Votes	%	±%
South Tyneside Progressives	James Capstick	1,918	70.8	+9.7
Labour	Mervyn Owen	791	29.2	−9.7
Majority		1,127	41.6	+19.4
Turnout		2,709	48.1	

Westoe
Party	Candidate	Votes	%	±%
Labour	Allen Branley	1,243	40.7	−1.4
Conservative	George Wilkinson	1,118	36.6	+1.4
Liberal Democrats	Jennifer Burke	691	22.6	−0.1
Majority		125	4.1	−2.8
Turnout		3,052	48.6	
Labour hold		Swing		

Whitburn and Marsden
Party	Candidate	Votes	%	±%
Labour	Shirley Stratford	1,312	50.8	+0.2
Conservative	Miles Atkinson	727	28.2	+1.2
Liberal Democrats	David Selby	542	21.0	−1.4
Majority		585	22.6	−1.0
Turnout		2,581	48.8	
Labour hold		Swing		

Whiteleas
Party	Candidate	Votes	%	±%
Independent	John Haram	1,398	50.1	+14.2
Labour	Ernest Gibson	1,392	49.9	−0.9
Majority		6	0.2	
Turnout		2,790	50.3	
Independent gain from Labour		Swing		
