= 2011 South Tyneside Metropolitan Borough Council election =

2011 UK local government election

The 2011 South Tyneside Metropolitan Borough Council election was held on Thursday 5 May 2011 to elect 18 members to South Tyneside Council, the same day as other local elections in the United Kingdom. It elected one-third of the council's 54 members to a four-year term. Labour held control of the council after the election.

== Results summary ==
2011 South Tyneside Metropolitan Borough Council election
Party	This election			Full council			This election		
Party	Seats	Net	Seats %	Other	Total	Total %	Votes	Votes %	+/−
Labour	15	▲3	83.3	24	39	72.2	24,327	53.7	
Independent	3	Steady	16.7	7	10	18.5	9,934	21.9	
Conservative	0	▼1	0.0	2	2	3.7	6,436	14.2	
Progressives	0	▼1	0.0	2	2	3.7	1,486	3.3	
Liberal Democrats	0	▼1	0.0	1	1	1.9	1,117	2.5	
BNP	0	Steady	0.0	0	0	0.0	1,054	2.3	
Green	0	Steady	0.0	0	0	0.0	554	1.2	
Liberal	0	Steady	0.0	0	0	0.0	398	0.9	

== Ward results ==
=== Beacon and Bents ===
Beacon and Bents
Party	Candidate	Votes	%	±%
Labour	Audrey McMillan*	1,131	41.3	▲7.6
Independent	Jim Hodgson	842	30.7	New
Conservative	Ali Hayder	341	12.4	▲6.0
Independent	Peter Elliott	188	6.9	New
BNP	James Hills	165	6.0	▼7.3
Liberal Democrats	Lawrence Hopkins	48	1.8	New
Independent	Bill Troupe	24	0.9	New
Majority		289	10.6	▲9.3
Total valid votes		2,739	39.8	
Turnout			40.2	
Registered electors		6,879		
Labour hold		Swing	▼19.2	

=== Bede ===
Bede
Party	Candidate	Votes	%	±%
Labour	Fay Cunningham	1,176	55.7	▲3.2
Independent	Tom Defty	740	35.0	New
Conservative	Oliver Wallhead	111	5.3	▼0.8
Green	Tony Gair	86	4.1	New
Majority		436	20.6	▼3.4
Total valid votes		2,113	35.1	
Turnout			35.4	
Registered electors		6,017		
Labour hold		Swing	▼15.9	

=== Biddick and All Saints ===
Biddick and All Saints
Party	Candidate	Votes	%	±%
Labour	Tom Pigott*	1,253	62.5	▲22.5
Independent	Kathy Sheerin	529	26.4	New
Conservative	Brian Gilchrist	129	6.4	▲1.9
Liberal	David Selby	95	4.7	New
Majority		724	36.1	▲30.2
Total valid votes		2,006	32.0	
Turnout			32.3	
Registered electors		6,275		
Labour hold		Swing	▼3.8	

=== Boldon Colliery ===
Boldon Colliery
Party	Candidate	Votes	%	±%
Labour	Sherie Murphy	1,506	51.8	▲5.0
Independent	Ian Diamond	967	33.3	New
Conservative	Stewart Hay	322	11.1	▼0.6
BNP	Ileene Gilchrist	113	3.9	New
Majority		539	18.5	▲13.2
Total valid votes		2,908	39.8	
Turnout			39.9	
Registered electors		7,305		
Labour hold		Swing	▼14.1	

=== Cleadon and East Boldon ===
Cleadon and East Boldon
Party	Candidate	Votes	%	±%
Labour	Joan Atkinson	1,931	50.2	▲15.0
Conservative	Donald Wood*	1,590	41.3	▼23.5
South Tyneside Progressives	Lilian Milne	238	6.2	New
Independent	David Lawson	88	2.3	New
Majority		341	8.9	N/A
Total valid votes		3,847	55.4	
Turnout				
Registered electors		6,944		
Labour gain from Conservative		Swing	▲19.2	

=== Cleadon Park ===
Cleadon Park
Party	Candidate	Votes	%	±%
Independent	George Elsom*	838	41.9	▼15.4
Labour	Doreen Purvis	779	38.9	▲6.6
Independent	Colin Campbell	224	11.2	New
Conservative	Tamara Alani	160	8.0	▼2.4
Majority		59	2.9	▼22.0
Total valid votes		2,001	38.2	
Turnout			38.3	
Registered electors		5,243		
Independent hold		Swing	▼11.0	

=== Fellgate and Hedworth ===
Fellgate and Hedworth (Note: The incumbent member for the seat, independent politician George Waddle, did not run again, so this seat is marked as an independent gain.)
Party	Candidate	Votes	%	±%
Independent	Linda Hemmer	1,234	48.9	New
Labour	Moira Smith	1,101	43.6	▲6.7
Conservative	Ian Armstrong	113	4.5	▼2.0
BNP	Maureen Scott	76	3.0	New
Majority		133	5.3	N/A
Total valid votes		2,524	42.3	
Turnout			42.4	
Registered electors		5,971		
Independent gain from Independent		Swing	▲21.1	

=== Harton ===
Harton
Party	Candidate	Votes	%	±%
Labour	Rob Dix*	1,484	53.0	▲7.4
South Tyneside Progressives	Lawrence Nolan	712	25.4	▼12.2
Conservative	Marilyn Huartt	318	11.4	▲2.0
Independent	Terence Smith	183	6.5	New
Liberal	Melanie Baker	101	3.6	New
Majority		772	27.6	▲19.6
Total valid votes		2,798	41.4	
Turnout			41.7	
Registered electors		6,754		
Labour hold		Swing	▲9.8	

=== Hebburn North ===
Hebburn North
Party	Candidate	Votes	%	±%
Labour	Ian Harkus	1,264	54.7	▲16.3
Liberal Democrats	John McKie*	653	28.3	▼13.0
Conservative	Anna Robinson	270	11.7	▲7.0
BNP	Martin Vaughan	122	5.3	▼10.2
Majority		611	26.5	N/A
Total valid votes		2,309	35.6	
Turnout			35.7	
Registered electors		6,484		
Labour gain from Liberal Democrats		Swing	▲14.7	

=== Hebburn South ===
Hebburn South
Party	Candidate	Votes	%	±%
Labour	Eddie McAtominey*	2,023	78.9	▲27.0
Conservative	John Coe	542	21.1	▲14.2
Majority		1,481	57.7	▲33.2
Total valid votes		2,565	42.1	
Turnout			42.7	
Registered electors		6,096		
Labour hold		Swing	▲6.4	

=== Horsley Hill ===
Horsley Hill
Party	Candidate	Votes	%	±%
Labour	Iain Malcolm	1,700	54.3	▲9.6
Independent	Kraig White	738	23.6	New
Conservative	Ross Huartt	379	12.1	▼0.9
Liberal Democrats	Enid Berry	164	5.2	▼0.9
Liberal	David Wood	77	2.5	New
Independent	Vivienne Mahon	70	2.2	New
Majority		962	30.8	▲7.0
Total valid votes		3,128	45.0	
Turnout			45.3	
Registered electors		6,957		
Labour hold		Swing	▼7.0	

=== Monkton ===
Monkton
Party	Candidate	Votes	%	±%
Labour	Alan Kerr*	1,333	55.2	▲19.3
Independent	Graeme Slator	761	31.5	New
Conservative	James Milburn	198	8.2	▼0.8
Liberal Democrats	Susan Troupe	122	5.1	▼6.7
Majority		572	23.7	▲18.7
Total valid votes		2,414	37.7	
Turnout			37.9	
Registered electors		6,411		
Labour hold		Swing	▼6.1	

=== Primrose ===
Primrose
Party	Candidate	Votes	%	±%
Labour	Ken Stephenson* (Note: Stephenson was elected in the 25 February 2010 by-election following the death of Barrie Scorer, who was elected in the 2007 election for Primrose.)	1,157	53.0	▲1.3
Independent	John Robertson	767	35.2	New
Conservative	Anthony Lanaghan	164	7.5	▼5.6
Independent	Pete Hodgkinson (Note: Pete Hodgkinson ran as the BNP candidate for the Primrose ward in 2007, and the change in vote share listed is from that result.)	93	4.3	▼20.2
Majority		390	17.9	▼9.4
Total valid votes		2,181	34.8	
Turnout			35.1	
Registered electors		6,266		
Labour hold		Swing	▼16.9	

=== Simonside and Rekendyke ===
Simonside and Rekendyke
Party	Candidate	Votes	%	±%
Labour	Michael Clare*	1,374	66.3	▲9.6
Conservative	George Smith	206	9.9	▼1.4
Green	David Moore	183	8.8	New
BNP	Peter Foreman	179	8.6	New
Liberal Democrats	Carole Troupe	130	6.3	▼4.9
Majority		1,168	56.37	▲20.3
Total valid votes		2,072	32.4	
Turnout			32.5	
Registered electors		6,399		
Labour hold		Swing	▲5.5	

=== West Park ===
West Park
Party	Candidate	Votes	%	±%
Labour	Joyce Welsh	971	46.1	▲15.0
South Tyneside Progressives	Marjorie Robinson*	536	25.4	▼19.4
Conservative	Edward Russell	293	13.9	▲3.3
BNP	Lynne Graham	127	6.0	New
Green	Vicki Grist	127	6.0	New
Liberal	Lindsey Tolson	53	2.5	New
Majority		435	20.6	N/A
Total valid votes		2,107	36.1	
Turnout			36.3	
Registered electors		5,836		
Labour gain from Progressives		Swing	▲17.2	

=== Westoe ===
Westoe
Party	Candidate	Votes	%	±%
Independent	Jane Branley*	1,199	44.2	▼29.4
Labour	Patricia Hay	968	35.7	▲17.3
Conservative	Anthony Dailly	315	11.6	▲3.6
Green	Lynne Barber	158	5.8	New
Liberal	Joseph Stephenson	72	2.7	New
Majority		231	8.52	▼46.7
Total valid votes		2,712	41.2	
Turnout			41.4	
Registered electors		6,577		
Independent hold		Swing	▼23.3	

=== Whitburn and Marsden ===
Whitburn and Marsden
Party	Candidate	Votes	%	±%
Labour	Sylvia Spraggon*	1,648	67.2	▲28.0
Conservative	Elizabeth Turnbull	804	32.8	▲8.0
Majority		844	34.4	▲31.3
Total valid votes		2,452	42.2	
Turnout			42.7	
Registered electors		5,810		
Labour hold		Swing	▲10.0	

=== Whiteleas ===
Whiteleas
Party	Candidate	Votes	%	±%
Labour	Ernest Gibson*	1,528	62.9	▲3.9
Independent	Margaret Haram	449	18.5	New
BNP	Christopher Thornton	272	11.2	New
Conservative	Christopher Taylor	181	7.4	New
Majority		1,079	44.4	▲26.5
Total valid votes		2,430	37.0	
Turnout			37.2	
Registered electors		6,576		
Labour hold		Swing	▼7.3	
