= 2024 South Tyneside Metropolitan Borough Council election =

2024 local government election in North East England

← 2023	2 May 2024	2026 →

18 of 54 seats to South Tyneside Council 28 seats needed for a majority

	Majority party	Minority party
Leader	Tracey Dixon
Party	Labour	Independent
Last election	38 seats, 44.0%	6 seats, 22.7%
Seats before	38	6
Seats won	4	10
Seats after	28	15
Seat change	▼10	▲9
Popular vote	13,119	11,770
Percentage	35.5%	31.9%
Swing	▼8.5%	▲9.2%
	Third party	Fourth party
Leader	David Francis
Party	Green	Conservative
Last election	9 seats, 21.7%	1 seat, 10.3%
Seats before	9	1
Seats won	4	0
Seats after	11	0
Seat change	▲2	▼1
Popular vote	9,640	1,709
Percentage	26.1%	4.6%
Swing	▲4.4%	▼5.7%
- Winner of each seat at the 2024 South Tyneside Metropolitan Borough Council election
Leader before election
Tracey Dixon
Labour
Leader after election
Tracey Dixon
Labour

The 2024 South Tyneside Metropolitan Borough Council election was held on 2 May 2024 to elect members of South Tyneside Metropolitan Borough Council. 18 of the 54 seats of the council were up for election. The election took place at the same time as other local elections across England.

Bucking the trend of the rest of the country, the election saw Labour's seat count drop dramatically, losing ten seats nearly entirely to independent candidates. With 28 seats, Labour was left with only just enough seats for control of the council. The party's poor performance was described as being down to a 'perfect storm' of issues by the council's Labour leader Tracey Dixon, further adding that Labour needed to 'restart' and 'work more closely' with the council's communities. The results were put down to growing dissatisfaction with the council due to ongoing bin collection strikes that began in late 2023, the council's children services being rated "inadequate" by Ofsted, and the fallout surrounding previous Labour Leader of the council, Iain Malcolm, being found in March 2024 to have inappropriately incurred £18,000 of personal costs on his corporate credit card and bullied council staff.

The Conservatives also lost their only seat on the council, with their Cleadon & East Bolden ward seat going to the Greens.

== Summary ==
=== Election result ===
South Tyneside Council's composition after the 2024 local elections

2024 South Tyneside Metropolitan Borough Council election
Party	This election			Full council			This election		
Party	Seats	Net	Seats %	Other	Total	Total %	Votes	Votes %	+/−
Labour	4	▼10	22.2	24	28	51.8	13,119	35.5	–8.5
Independent	10	▲9	55.6	5	15	27.8	11,770	31.9	+9.2
Green	4	▲2	22.2	7	11	20.4	9,640	26.1	+4.4
Conservative	0	▼1	0.0	0	0	0.0	1,709	4.6	–5.7
Reform UK	0	Steady	0.0	0	0	0.0	678	1.8	+1.3

== Ward results ==
=== Beacon & Bents ===
Beacon & Bents
Party	Candidate	Votes	%	±%
Green	Sue Stonehouse*	1,762	67.6	+7.4
Labour	Jabed Hossain	843	32.4	+3.5
Majority		919	35.2	+3.9
Turnout		2,662	38.7	+2.5
Registered electors		6,883		
Green hold		Swing	▲2.0	

=== Bede ===
Bede
Party	Candidate	Votes	%	±%
Independent	Terry Foggon	1,025	59.7	+11.8
Labour	Margaret Peacock*	497	29.0	–10.2
Green	John Chilton	194	11.3	+4.7
Majority		528	30.7	+22.0
Turnout		1,734	29.4	+1.6
Registered electors		5,903		
Independent gain from Labour		Swing	▲11.0	

=== Biddick & All Saints ===
Biddick & All Saints
Party	Candidate	Votes	%	±%
Green	Chris Davies	1,006	69.8	+17.1
Labour	Shiela Hussain	436	30.2	–4.5
Majority		570	39.6	+21.5
Turnout		1,468	23.7	+0.5
Registered electors		6,207		
Green gain from Labour		Swing	▲10.8	

=== Boldon Colliery ===
Boldon Colliery
Party	Candidate	Votes	%	±%
Independent	Simon Oliver	1,104	46.8	+11.3
Labour	Joanne Bell*	1,087	46.1	–1.6
Green	Darius Seago	166	7.0	+0.9
Majority		17	0.7	N/A
Turnout		2,377	33.6	+0.9
Registered electors		7,081		
Independent gain from Labour		Swing	▲6.5	

=== Cleadon & East Boldon ===
Cleadon & East Boldon
Party	Candidate	Votes	%	±%
Green	Rhiannon Curtis	1,520	47.5	+7.4
Conservative	Ian Forster*	958	29.9	+3.0
Labour	Kevin Brydon	724	22.6	–8.2
Majority		562	17.6	+8.3
Turnout		3,221	46.8	–2.8
Registered electors		6,877		
Green gain from Conservative		Swing	▲2.2	

=== Cleadon Park ===
Cleadon Park
Party	Candidate	Votes	%	±%
Independent	Steven Harrison	917	53.2	+16.7
Labour	Ken Stephenson	544	31.5	–5.4
Green	John Riley	264	15.3	+2.7
Majority		373	21.7	N/A
Turnout		1,745	30.8	+2.3
Registered electors		5,674		
Independent gain from Labour		Swing	▲11.1	

=== Fellgate & Hedworth ===
Fellgate & Hedworth
Party	Candidate	Votes	%	±%
Independent	Tony Roberts	913	46.6	N/A
Labour	Audrey Fay-Huntley*	733	37.4	–16.7
Green	Nicola Cook	171	8.7	+2.1
Independent	Ian Diamond	142	7.2	–31.8
Majority		180	9.2	N/A
Turnout		1,955	34.8	+1.9
Registered electors		5,620		
Independent gain from Labour				

=== Harton ===
Harton
Party	Candidate	Votes	%	±%
Independent	Karen Myers	846	38.8	+4.0
Labour	Karen Dix	653	30.0	–11.1
Reform UK	Jim Mouat	414	19.0	+10.5
Green	Colin Tosh	267	12.2	–3.1
Majority		193	8.8	N/A
Turnout		2,188	33.4	+1.8
Registered electors		6,543		
Independent gain from Labour		Swing	▲7.6	

=== Hebburn North ===
Hebburn North
Party	Candidate	Votes	%	±%
Labour	Liz McHugh*	860	44.4	–27.5
Independent	Brian Goodman	845	43.6	N/A
Green	Annette Chapman	231	11.9	+1.5
Majority		15	0.8	–60.5
Turnout		1,949	28.3	+1.9
Registered electors		6,884		
Labour hold				

=== Hebburn South ===
Hebburn South
Party	Candidate	Votes	%	±%
Labour	John McCabe*	1,279	60.1	+9.4
Green	Briony Sommers	849	39.9	+32.7
Majority		430	20.2	+0.9
Turnout		2,190	29.6	+0.4
Registered electors		7,399		
Labour hold		Swing	▼11.7	

=== Horsley Hill ===
Horsley Hill
Party	Candidate	Votes	%	±%
Independent	Phil Brown	887	39.2	+13.1
Labour	Dorothy Grainger	713	31.5	–10.4
Green	Carrie Richardson	428	18.9	+2.3
Conservative	Stan Wildhirt	233	10.3	–4.9
Majority		174	7.7	N/A
Turnout		2,278	34.3	+2.2
Registered electors		6,645		
Independent gain from Labour		Swing	▲11.8	

=== Monkton ===
Monkton
Party	Candidate	Votes	%	±%
Labour	Joan Keegan*	887	42.8	–18.4
Independent	Joan Hamilton	699	33.7	N/A
Reform UK	Marian Stead	264	12.7	N/A
Green	Matty McKenna	223	10.8	–9.3
Majority		188	9.1	–32.0
Turnout		2,089	31.3	+4.0
Registered electors		6,679		
Labour hold				

=== Primrose ===
Primrose
Party	Candidate	Votes	%	±%
Independent	David Kennedy*	1,004	56.7	+5.2
Labour	Stephen Pearson	617	34.8	–3.8
Green	Elaine Francis	150	8.5	+4.1
Majority		387	21.9	+9.0
Turnout		1,786	29.5	+1.5
Registered electors		6,056		
Independent hold		Swing	▲4.5	

=== Simonside & Rekendyke ===
Simonside & Rekendyke
Party	Candidate	Votes	%	±%
Independent	Kenneth Wood	750	41.8	+20.6
Labour	Edward Malcolm	683	38.1	–12.6
Green	Bethany Telford	361	20.1	–0.2
Majority		67	3.7	N/A
Turnout		1,804	28.2	+1.5
Registered electors		6,386		
Independent gain from Labour		Swing	▲16.6	

=== West Park ===
West Park
Party	Candidate	Votes	%	±%
Green	Nicky Gynn	1,013	53.8	–1.7
Independent	Justin Knight	507	26.9	+19.8
Labour	Sean McDonagh	362	19.2	–11.6
Majority		506	26.9	+2.2
Turnout		1,894	35.3	+1.5
Registered electors		5,363		
Green hold		Swing	▼10.8	

=== Westoe ===
Westoe
Party	Candidate	Votes	%	±%
Independent	Kate Owens-Palmer	1,316	61.1	+12.6
Labour	Sandra Duncan	498	23.1	–12.0
Green	Georgina Holt	340	15.8	+5.8
Majority		818	38.0	+24.6
Turnout		2,180	36.2	+0.6
Registered electors		6,028		
Independent gain from Labour		Swing	▲12.3	

=== Whitburn & Marsden ===
Whitburn & Marsden
Party	Candidate	Votes	%	±%
Labour	Tracey Dixon*	1,115	53.9	–0.6
Green	Edward Littley	528	25.5	+7.2
Conservative	Heidi Wildhirt	424	20.5	–5.8
Majority		587	28.4	+0.2
Turnout		2,093	35.7	+2.3
Registered electors		5,869		
Labour hold		Swing	▼3.9	

=== Whiteleas ===
Whiteleas
Party	Candidate	Votes	%	±%
Independent	Robin Coombes	815	49.0	+23.8
Labour	Michelle Turnbull	588	35.3	–22.1
Green	Sophie-Jane Williams	167	10.0	–0.3
Conservative	Dawn Wildhart	94	5.6	N/A
Majority		227	13.7	N/A
Turnout		1,677	27.4	+1.5
Registered electors		6,131		
Independent gain from Labour		Swing	▲23.0	
