= 2002 South Tyneside Metropolitan Borough Council election =

2002 UK local government election

The 2002 South Tyneside Metropolitan Borough Council election took place on 2 May 2002 to elect members of South Tyneside Metropolitan Borough Council in Tyne and Wear, England. One third of the council was up for election and the Labour Party kept overall control of the council.

After the election, the composition of the council was:

- Labour 50
- Liberal Democrat 6
- Others 4

== Campaign ==
20 seats were contested in the election with 6 Progressives and 3 independents standing in addition to 20 Labour, 17 Liberal Democrat and 12 Conservative candidates. Meanwhile, 3 sitting Labour councillors stood down at the election, Cathy Brown, Alex Tudberry and Ed Malcolm.

The election saw all postal voting in an attempt to increase voter turnout, along with a trial of an electronic counting system. Postal voting was successful in increasing turnout with over half of voters taking part, at 55% turnout had increased significantly on the 27% seen in the previous election in 2000.

== Election result ==
The results saw Labour maintain their majority on the council after not losing any seats in the election. Labour held all 3 seats that had been seen as key wards, Beacon and Bent, Westoe and Whiteleas, while the Liberal Democrat leader on the council, Jim Selby, was re-elected in Cleadon and East Boldon.

South Tyneside local election result 2002
Party	Seats	Gains	Losses	Net gain/loss	Seats %	Votes %	Votes	+/−
Labour	17	0	0	0	85.0	52.5	32,038	
Liberal Democrats	2	0	0	0	10.0	22.2	13,523	
South Tyneside Progressives	1	0	0	0	5.0	7.8	4,784	
Conservative	0	0	0	0	0	12.4	7,582	
Independent	0	0	0	0	0	5.0	3,078	

== Ward results ==
All Saints
Party	Candidate	Votes	%	±%
Labour	John Temple	1,676	64.9	
South Tyneside Progressives	Robert Burdon	716	27.7	
Liberal Democrats	Nader Afshari-Naderi	192	7.4	
Majority		960	37.2	
Turnout		2,584		
Labour hold		Swing		

Beacon and Bents
Party	Candidate	Votes	%	±%
Labour	Audrey Mcmillan	1,578	55.1	
South Tyneside Progressives	Gordon Finch	1,284	44.9	
Majority		294	10.2	
Turnout		2,862		
Labour hold		Swing		

Bede
Party	Candidate	Votes	%	±%
Labour	Agnes Stewart	1,942	78.0	
Liberal Democrats	Constance Softley	549	22.0	
Majority		1,393	56.0	
Turnout		2,491		
Labour hold		Swing		

Biddick Hall
Party	Candidate	Votes	%	±%
Labour	Joseph Kidd	1,673	63.5	
Liberal Democrats	Doreen Mason	702	26.7	
Conservative	James Cain	258	9.8	
Majority		971	36.8	
Turnout		2,633		
Labour hold		Swing		

Boldon Colliery
Party	Candidate	Votes	%	±%
Labour	Alison Strike	2,468	67.5	
Liberal Democrats	Frederick Taylor	765	20.9	
Conservative	Gerald Brebner	422	11.5	
Majority		1,703	46.6	
Turnout		3,655		
Labour hold		Swing		

Cleadon and East Boldon
Party	Candidate	Votes	%	±%
Liberal Democrats	James Selby	2,024	47.5	
Conservative	Donald Wood	1,339	31.4	
Labour	Scott Duffy	900	21.1	
Majority		685	16.1	
Turnout		4,263		
Liberal Democrats hold		Swing		

Cleadon Park
Party	Candidate	Votes	%	±%
Labour	Alexander Donaldson	1,351	45.7	
Independent	George Elsom	1,025	34.7	
Liberal Democrats	David Selby	581	19.6	
Majority		326	11.0	
Turnout		2,957		
Labour hold		Swing		

Fellgate and Hedworth
Party	Candidate	Votes	%	±%
Labour	Moira Smith	2,241	67.2	
Liberal Democrats	Charles Rutherford	708	21.2	
Conservative	Philip Parkinson	387	11.6	
Majority		1,533	46.0	
Turnout		3,336		
Labour hold		Swing		

Harton
Party	Candidate	Votes	%	±%
Labour	Robert Haws	1,578	51.5	
Liberal Democrats	Dorothy Grainger	790	25.8	
Conservative	Edward Russell	695	22.7	
Majority		788	25.7	
Turnout		3,063		
Labour hold		Swing		

Hebburn Quay
Party	Candidate	Votes	%	±%
Liberal Democrats	Joseph Abbott	1,792	58.2	
Labour	Brian McLoughlin	1,288	41.8	
Majority		504	16.4	
Turnout		3,080		
Liberal Democrats hold		Swing		

Hebburn South
Party	Candidate	Votes	%	±%
Labour	Henry McAtominey	1,348	46.6	
Independent	John McCabe	891	30.8	
Liberal Democrats	Sheila Bennett	475	16.4	
Conservative	John Coe	180	6.2	
Majority		873	15.8	
Turnout		2,894		
Labour hold		Swing		

Horsley Hill
Party	Candidate	Votes	%	±%
Labour	Wallace Hobson	1,788	50.7	
Conservative	Nicola Aynsley	1,296	36.8	
Liberal Democrats	Christine Hartley	442	12.5	
Majority		492	13.9	
Turnout		3,526		
Labour hold		Swing		

Monkton
Party	Candidate	Votes	%	±%
Labour	Alan Kerr	1,854	57.0	
Liberal Democrats	Philip Holmes	1,041	32.0	
Conservative	Mary Golightly	358	11.0	
Majority		813	25.0	
Turnout		3,253		
Labour hold		Swing		

Primrose
Party	Candidate	Votes	%	±%
Labour	Barrie Scorer	1,890	60.0	
Liberal Democrats	Rosalind Slater	871	27.6	
Conservative	Walter Armstrong	390	12.4	
Majority		1,019	32.4	
Turnout		3,151		
Labour hold		Swing		

Refendyke
Party	Candidate	Votes	%	±%
Labour	Andrew Frost	1,480	56.4	
Liberal Democrats	Jennifer Burke	595	22.7	
South Tyneside Progressives	Sabrae Brown	547	20.9	
Majority		885	33.7	
Turnout		2,622		
Labour hold		Swing		

Tyne Dock and Simonside
Party	Candidate	Votes	%	±%
Labour	Anne Walsh	1,294	59.7	
Liberal Democrats	Gary Ahmed	579	26.7	
Conservative	Patricia Pigott	295	13.6	
Majority		715	33.0	
Turnout		2,168		
Labour hold		Swing		

West Park
Party	Candidate	Votes	%	±%
South Tyneside Progressives	Enid Hetherington	1,807	61.1	
Labour	John Anglin	1,151	38.9	
Majority		656	22.2	
Turnout		2,958		

Westoe
Party	Candidate	Votes	%	±%
Labour	Joan Jackson	1,384	42.1	
Conservative	George Wilkinson	1,155	35.2	
Liberal Democrats	Peter Carlin-Page	746	22.7	
Majority		229	6.9	
Turnout		3,285		
Labour hold		Swing		

Whitburn and Marsden
Party	Candidate	Votes	%	±%
Labour	Tracey Dixon	1,512	50.6	
Conservative	Miles Atkinson	807	27.0	
Liberal Democrats	Ronald Callaghan	671	22.4	
Majority		705	23.6	
Turnout		2,990		
Labour hold		Swing		

Whiteleas
Party	Candidate	Votes	%	±%
Labour	Mavis Brady	1,642	50.8	
Independent	John Haram	1,162	35.9	
South Tyneside Progressives	Lawrence Nolan	430	13.3	
Majority		480	14.9	
Turnout		3,234		
Labour hold		Swing		
