= South Tyneside Council =

English metropolitan district council

Type
- Type: Metropolitan borough

History
- Founded: 1 April 1974

Leadership
- Mayor: Stan Wildhirt, Reform UK since 19 May 2026
- Leader: Paul Mackings, Reform UK since 19 May 2026
- Chief Executive: Jonathan Tew since August 2021

Structure
- Seats: 54 councillors
- Graph of the party split among 54 seats.
- Political groups: Administration (40) Reform (40) Other parties (14) Green (10) Labour (1) Independent (3)

Elections
- Last election: 7 May 2026
- Next election: 6 May 2027

Meeting place
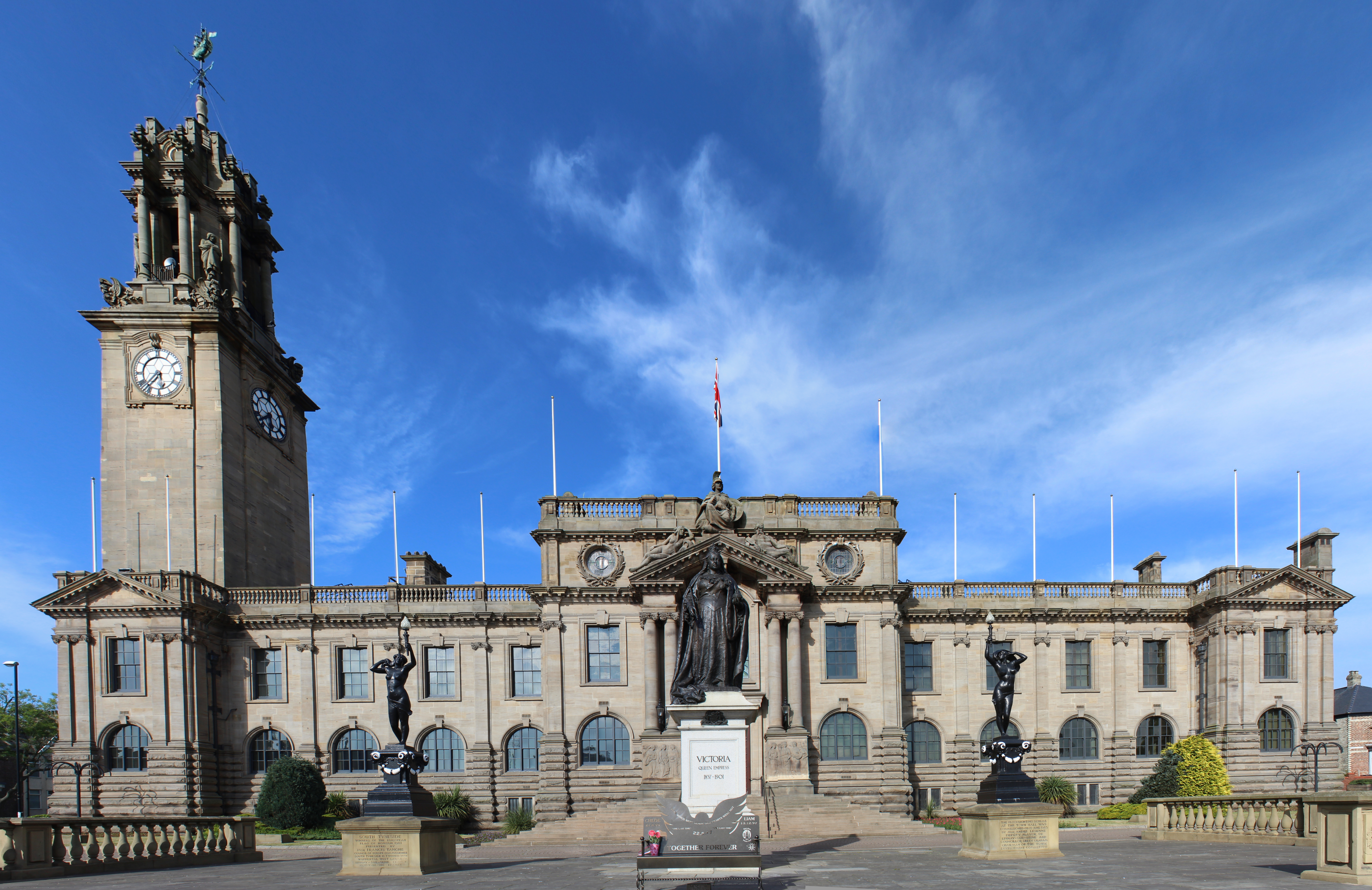
- Town Hall, Westoe Road, South Shields, NE33 2RL

Website
- www.southtyneside.gov.uk

South Tyneside Council is the local authority of for the metropolitan borough of South Tyneside in the ceremonial county of Tyne and Wear in North East England. It is one of five metropolitan boroughs in Tyne and Wear and one of 36 in England. It provides the majority of local government services in South Tyneside. The council has been under Reform UK majority control since 2026. It is based at South Shields Town Hall. The council is a constituent member of the North East Mayoral Combined Authority.

== History ==
South Tyneside was created on 1 April 1974 under the Local Government Act 1972 as a metropolitan district within the new county of Tyne and Wear. The new district covered the area of four former districts, which were all abolished at the same time:

- Boldon Urban District
- Hebburn Urban District
- Jarrow Municipal Borough
- South Shields County Borough

Boldon, Hebburn and Jarrow had been lower-tier authorities subordinate to Durham County Council prior to the reforms. South Shields had been a self-governing county borough. The new district was named "South Tyneside" reflecting its position both relative to the River Tyne and within the Tyneside conurbation. The new district was awarded borough status from its creation, allowing the chair of the council to take the title of mayor.

Between 1974 and 1986 the council formed the lower tier of local government, with Tyne and Wear County Council providing county-level services to the area. The county council was abolished in 1986 under the Local Government Act 1985, since when South Tyneside Council has been responsible for all local government services.

== Governance ==
Since 1986 the council has provided both district-level and county-level functions, with some services being provided through joint arrangements with the other Tyne and Wear councils. In 2024 a combined authority was established covering South Tyneside, County Durham, Gateshead, Newcastle upon Tyne, North Tyneside, Northumberland and Sunderland, called the North East Mayoral Combined Authority. It is chaired by the directly elected Mayor of the North East and oversees the delivery of certain strategic functions across the area.

=== Political control ===
The council has been under Reform majority control since the May 2026 election.

The first election to the council was held in 1973, initially operating as a shadow authority before coming into its powers on 1 April 1974. Political control of the council since 1974 has been as follows:

Party in control	Years
Labour	1974–1978
No overall control	1978–1979
Labour	1979–2025
No overall control	2025–2026
Reform	2026-present

=== Leadership ===
The role of mayor is largely ceremonial in South Tyneside. Political leadership is provided by the leader of the council. The leaders since 1997 have been:

Councillor	Party	From	To
Paul Waggott	Labour	1997	May 2008
Iain Malcolm	Labour	13 May 2008	17 Nov 2020
Tracey Dixon	Labour	14 Jan 2021	May 2026
Paul Mackings	Reform	19 May 2026	

=== Composition ===
Following the 2026 local election, and subsequent by-elections and changes of allegiance up to August 2026, the composition of the council was:

Party	Seats
Reform	40
Green	10
Labour	1
Independent	3
Total	54

Two of the independent councillors sit together as the "South Tyneside Alliance" group. The next election is due in 2027.

== Premises ==
The council is based at the South Shields Town Hall, which had been completed in 1910 for the old South Shields Borough Council.

== Elections ==
Since the last boundary changes took effect in 2026, the council has comprised 54 councillors representing 18 wards, with each ward electing three councillors. Elections are held three years out of every four, with a third of the council elected each time.
