= Knowsley Metropolitan Borough Council elections =

Local government elections in Merseyside, England

Knowsley Metropolitan Borough Council elections are generally held three years out of every four, with a third of the council being elected each time. Knowsley Metropolitan Borough Council, generally known as Knowsley Council, is the local authority for the metropolitan borough of Knowsley in Merseyside, England. Since the last boundary changes in 2016, 45 councillors have been elected from 15 wards.

== Council elections ==
- 1973 Knowsley Metropolitan Borough Council election
- 1975 Knowsley Metropolitan Borough Council election
- 1976 Knowsley Metropolitan Borough Council election
- 1978 Knowsley Metropolitan Borough Council election
- 1979 Knowsley Metropolitan Borough Council election
- 1980 Knowsley Metropolitan Borough Council election
- 1982 Knowsley Metropolitan Borough Council election (new ward boundaries)
- 1983 Knowsley Metropolitan Borough Council election
- 1984 Knowsley Metropolitan Borough Council election
- 1986 Knowsley Metropolitan Borough Council election
- 1987 Knowsley Metropolitan Borough Council election
- 1988 Knowsley Metropolitan Borough Council election
- 1990 Knowsley Metropolitan Borough Council election
- 1991 Knowsley Metropolitan Borough Council election
- 1992 Knowsley Metropolitan Borough Council election
- 1994 Knowsley Metropolitan Borough Council election
- 1995 Knowsley Metropolitan Borough Council election
- 1996 Knowsley Metropolitan Borough Council election
- 1998 Knowsley Metropolitan Borough Council election
- 1999 Knowsley Metropolitan Borough Council election
- 2000 Knowsley Metropolitan Borough Council election
- 2002 Knowsley Metropolitan Borough Council election
- 2003 Knowsley Metropolitan Borough Council election
- 2004 Knowsley Metropolitan Borough Council election (whole council elected after boundary changes reduced the number of seats by 3)
- 2006 Knowsley Metropolitan Borough Council election
- 2007 Knowsley Metropolitan Borough Council election
- 2008 Knowsley Metropolitan Borough Council election
- 2010 Knowsley Metropolitan Borough Council election
- 2011 Knowsley Metropolitan Borough Council election
- 2012 Knowsley Metropolitan Borough Council election
- 2014 Knowsley Metropolitan Borough Council election
- 2015 Knowsley Metropolitan Borough Council election
- 2016 Knowsley Metropolitan Borough Council election (whole council elected after boundary changes)
- 2018 Knowsley Metropolitan Borough Council election
- 2019 Knowsley Metropolitan Borough Council election
- 2021 Knowsley Metropolitan Borough Council election
- 2022 Knowsley Metropolitan Borough Council election
- 2023 Knowsley Metropolitan Borough Council election
- 2024 Knowsley Metropolitan Borough Council election
- 2026 Knowsley Metropolitan Borough Council election

== Results maps ==
2004 results map

2006 results map

2007 results map

2008 results map

2010 results map

2011 results map

2012 results map

2014 results map

2015 results map

2016 results map

2018 results map

2019 results map

2021 results map

2022 results map

2023 results map

2024 results map

2026 results map

== By-election results ==
=== 2002-2006 ===
Whiston South by-election 22 September 2005
Party	Candidate	Votes	%	±%
Labour		555	53.3	
Liberal Democrats		383	36.8	
Conservative		103	9.9	
Majority		172	16.5	
Turnout		1,041		
Labour hold		Swing		

=== 2006-2010 ===
Halewood South by-election 26 November 2009
Party	Candidate	Votes	%	±%
Labour	Allan Harvey	607	46.0	+12.1
Liberal Democrats	Tommy Morretta	486	36.8	−9.8
BNP		113	8.6	+8.6
United Socialist		52	3.9	−5.3
Conservative		32	2.4	−3.5
Independent		30	2.3	+2.3
Majority		121	9.2	
Turnout		1,320		
Labour gain from Liberal Democrats		Swing		

=== 2010-2014 ===
Park by-election 16 September 2010
Party	Candidate	Votes	%	±%
Labour	Tony Brennan	650	86.0	+6.1
Liberal Democrats	John White	70	9.3	−10.8
Conservative	Gary Robertson	36	4.8	+4.8
Majority		580	76.7	
Turnout		756		
Labour hold		Swing		

Page Moss by-election 18 August 2011
Party	Candidate	Votes	%	±%
Labour	Dave Tulley	541	82.5	−10.6
Liberal Democrats	John White	57	8.7	+1.8
Independent	Sean Watson	22	3.4	+3.4
Green	Marie Rea	21	3.2	+3.2
Conservative	Robert Avery	15	2.3	+2.3
Majority		484	73.8	
Turnout		656		
Labour hold		Swing		

Prescot East by-election 4 April 2013
Party	Candidate	Votes	%	±%
Labour	Steff O'Keeffe	515	57.9	−5.8
Liberal Democrats	Carl Cashman	328	36.9	+3.9
Conservative	Adam Butler	47	5.3	+2.0
Majority		187	21.0	
Turnout		890		
Labour hold		Swing		

Prescot West by-election 4 April 2013
Party	Candidate	Votes	%	±%
Labour	Lynn O'Keeffe	441	43.8	−2.8
Liberal Democrats	Ian Smith	403	40.1	+2.2
TUSC	Stephen Whatham	86	8.5	−1.3
Conservative	Robert Avery	62	6.2	+0.5
Green	Robert Mbanu	14	1.4	+1.4
Majority		38	3.8	
Turnout		1,006		
Labour hold		Swing		

St Michaels by-election 4 April 2013
Party	Candidate	Votes	%	±%
Labour	Vickie Lamb	676	85.7	−7.1
Liberal Democrats	Mike Currie	69	8.7	+1.5
Conservative	David Dunne	44	5.6	+5.6
Majority		607	76.9	
Turnout		789		
Labour hold		Swing		

Longview by-election 13 March 2014
Party	Candidate	Votes	%	±%
Labour	Margi O'Mara	670	64.8	−29.0
Independent	Paul Woods	327	31.6	+31.6
Conservative	Adam Butler	37	3.6	+3.6
Majority		343	33.2	
Turnout		1,034		
Labour hold		Swing		

=== 2014-2018 ===
St Michaels by-election 20 July 2017
Party	Candidate	Votes	%	±%
Labour	Mike Kearns	716	86.6	
Liberal Democrats	Dean Boyle	58	7.0	
Green	Kirk Sandringham	53	6.4	
Majority		658	79.6	
Turnout		827		
Labour hold		Swing		

Page Moss by-election 29 March 2018
Party	Candidate	Votes	%	±%
Labour	Del Arnall	657	78.2	
Green	Kirk Sandringham	74	8.8	
UKIP	Fred Fricker	68	8.1	
Conservative	Aaron Waters	41	4.9	
Majority		583	69.4	
Turnout		840		
Labour hold		Swing		

=== 2018-2022 ===
Halewood South by-election 23 August 2018
Party	Candidate	Votes	%	±%
Labour	Gary See	1,012	51.6	+5.8
Independent	Bob Swann	778	39.7	+39.7
Liberal Democrats	Jenny McNeilis	118	6.0	+6.0
Conservative	Victoria Smart	54	2.8	−4.1
Majority		234	11.9	
Turnout		1,962		
Labour hold		Swing		

=== 2022-2026 ===
Whitefield by-election 21 March 2024
Party	Candidate	Votes	%	±%
Independent	Brian Johns	659	54.1	+54.1
Labour	Robert Owens	558	45.9	−6.6
Majority		101	8.2	
Turnout		1,217		
Independent hold		Swing		

== See also ==
- Knowsley
- Knowsley Metropolitan Borough Council
- Merseyside County Council 1974–1986
- List of electoral wards in Merseyside
