= 2006 Knowsley Metropolitan Borough Council election =

2006 UK local government election

← 2004	4 May 2006	2007 →

22 of the 63 seats on Knowsley Metropolitan Borough Council 32 seats needed for a majority
	First party	Second party
Party	Labour	Liberal Democrats
Seats won	17	5
Seats after	51	12
Seat change	▼1	▲1
Popular vote	12,744	7,619
Percentage	56.7%	33.9%
Swing	▼0.6%	▼0.7%
- A map of the 2006 Knowsley Council election. Labour in red and Liberal Democrats in orange.
Council control before election
Labour
Council control after election
Labour

Elections to Knowsley Metropolitan Borough Council were held on 4 May 2006. One third of the council was up for election and the Labour Party kept overall control of the council.

After the election, the composition of the council was:

- Labour 51
- Liberal Democrat 12

== Election result ==
Knowsley local election result 2006
Party	Seats	Gains	Losses	Net gain/loss	Seats %	Votes %	Votes	+/−
Labour	17	1	2	-1	77.3	56.9	12,817	-0.6
Liberal Democrats	5	2	1	+1	22.7	33.6	7,579	-0.7
Conservative	0	0	0	0	0.0	5.3	1,201	+2.5
United Socialist	0	0	0	0	0.0	2.6	592	+2.6
BNP	0	0	0	0	0.0	0.8	188	+0.3
Socialist Labour	0	0	0	0	0.0	0.7	149	-1.1

Three Labour councillors were uncontested.

== Ward results ==
Cherryfield
Party	Candidate	Votes	%	±%
Labour	David Lonergan	760	73.4	
Liberal Democrats	John White	276	26.6	
Majority		484	46.8	
Turnout		1,036		
Labour hold		Swing		

Halewood North
Party	Candidate	Votes	%	±%
Liberal Democrats	David Smithson	812	68.8	
Labour	Edna Finneran	369	31.2	
Majority		443	37.6	
Turnout		1,181		
Liberal Democrats hold		Swing		

Halewood South
Party	Candidate	Votes	%	±%
Liberal Democrats	Dorothy Birch	576	40.6	
Labour	Roy Nicholson	533	37.6	
United Socialist	Andrew Thompson	310	21.8	
Majority		43	3.0	
Turnout		1,419		
Liberal Democrats gain from Labour		Swing		

Halewood West
Party	Candidate	Votes	%	±%
Labour	Thomas Fearns	794	73.8	
United Socialist	Eric McIntosh	282	26.2	
Majority		512	47.6	
Turnout		1,076		
Labour hold		Swing		

Kirkby Central
Party	Candidate	Votes	%	±%
Labour	Marie Stuart	uncontested		
Labour hold		Swing		

Northwood
Party	Candidate	Votes	%	±%
Labour	Michael Murphy	587	63.2	
Liberal Democrats	Patrick Williams	342	36.8	
Majority		245	26.4	
Turnout		929		
Labour hold		Swing		

Page Moss
Party	Candidate	Votes	%	±%
Labour	Laurence Nolan	765	83.1	
Liberal Democrats	Leslie Rigby	156	16.9	
Majority		609	66.2	
Turnout		921		
Labour hold		Swing		

Park
Party	Candidate	Votes	%	±%
Labour	John Greer	634	66.9	
Liberal Democrats	Thomas Rossiter	314	33.1	
Majority		320	33.8	
Turnout		948		
Labour hold		Swing		

Prescot East
Party	Candidate	Votes	%	±%
Liberal Democrats	Joseph McGarry	747	57.4	
Labour	David Friar	555	42.6	
Majority		192	14.8	
Turnout		1,302		
Liberal Democrats hold		Swing		

Prescot West
Party	Candidate	Votes	%	±%
Liberal Democrats	John Wynn	867	57.4	
Labour	Robert Whiley	494	32.7	
Socialist Labour	Stephen Whatham	149	9.9	
Majority		373	24.7	
Turnout		1,510		
Liberal Democrats hold		Swing		

Roby
Party	Candidate	Votes	%	±%
Labour	Christina O'Hare	988	53.7	
Conservative	Gary Robertson	851	46.3	
Majority		137	7.4	
Turnout		1,839		
Labour hold		Swing		

Shevington
Party	Candidate	Votes	%	±%
Labour	Malcolm Sharp	uncontested		
Labour hold		Swing		

St Bartholomews (2)
Party	Candidate	Votes	%	±%
Labour	Margaret Harvey	819		
Labour	Anthony Cunningham	789		
Liberal Democrats	Malcolm Swainbank	365		
Liberal Democrats	Mahmood Surti	236		
Turnout		2,209		
Labour hold		Swing		

St Gabriels
Party	Candidate	Votes	%	±%
Liberal Democrats	Frederick Fricker	737	56.0	
Labour	Michael Peers	579	44.0	
Majority		158	12.0	
Turnout		1,316		
Liberal Democrats gain from Labour		Swing		

St Michaels
Party	Candidate	Votes	%	±%
Labour	Kenneth Keith	882	61.3	
Liberal Democrats	Gary Anderson	557	38.7	
Majority		325	22.6	
Turnout		1,439		
Labour hold		Swing		

Stockbridge
Party	Candidate	Votes	%	±%
Labour	Michael Foulkes	uncontested		
Labour hold		Swing		

Swanside
Party	Candidate	Votes	%	±%
Labour	Graham Wright	1,098	75.8	
Conservative	Gillian Robertson	350	24.2	
Majority		748	51.6	
Turnout		1,448		
Labour hold		Swing		

Whiston North
Party	Candidate	Votes	%	±%
Labour	Pauline Kelly	660	51.5	
Liberal Democrats	Michael Lappin	621	48.5	
Majority		39	3.0	
Turnout		1,281		
Labour gain from Liberal Democrats		Swing		

Whiston South
Party	Candidate	Votes	%	±%
Labour	Anthony Newman	719	51.2	
Liberal Democrats	Yvonne Southern	685	48.8	
Majority		34	2.4	
Turnout		1,404		
Labour hold		Swing		

Whitefield
Party	Candidate	Votes	%	±%
Labour	Doris Keats	792	62.5	
Liberal Democrats	Peter Fisher	288	22.7	
BNP	Gary Aronsson	188	14.8	
Majority		504	39.8	
Turnout		1,268		
Labour hold		Swing		
