= 2010 Knowsley Metropolitan Borough Council election =

2010 English local government election

Map of the 2010 Knowsley Metropolitan Borough Council election

The 2010 Knowsley Metropolitan Borough Council election took place on 6 May 2010 to elect a third of the members of Knowsley Metropolitan Borough Council, the council of Knowsley in England. This was on the same day as the other local elections as well as the 2010 United Kingdom general election. The previous council election took place in 2008 and the following election was held in 2011. In the election, the council stayed under Labour Party control. Two weeks before election day, two Liberal Democrat councillors defected to Labour.

== Results ==
Party	Previous	Seats +/-	2008
Labour	48	▲5	53
Liberal Democrat	15	▼5	10

== See also ==
- Knowsley Metropolitan Borough Council elections
