= 2026 Knowsley Council election =

2026 English local government election

- 7 May 2026

16 out of 45 seats to Knowsley Council (including 1 by-election) 23 seats needed for a majority
| | Majority party | Minority party | Third party |
|---|---|---|---|
| Leader | Graham Morgan | Kai Taylor | N/A |
| Party | Labour | Green | Independent |
| Leader's seat | Swanside | Prescot South | N/A |
| Last election | 31 seats, 63.1% | 7 seats, 23.2% | 4 seats, 9.7% |
| Seats before | 30 | 8 (Note: Including vacant seat in Roby last held by the Greens.) | 4 |
| Seats won | 4 | 3 | 4 |
| Seats after | 24 | 8 | 6 |
| Seat change | ▼6 | Steady | ▲2 |
| Popular vote | 11,790 | 8,324 | 4,261 |
| Percentage | 31.3% | 22.1% | 11.3% |
| Swing | ▼31.8% | ▼0.9% | ▲1.6% |
| | Fourth party | Fifth party |
| Leader | Alexander Hitchmough | Mark Burke |
| Party | Reform | Liberal Democrats |
| Leader's seat | Northwood | Prescot North |
| Last election | 0 seats, 0.4% | 3 seats, 3.8% |
| Seats before | 0 | 3 |
| Seats won | 4 | 1 |
| Seats after | 4 | 3 |
| Seat change | ▲4 | Steady |
| Popular vote | 11,529 | 1,059 |
| Percentage | 30.4% | 2.8% |
| Swing | ▲30.0% | ▼1.0% |
- Winner of each seat at the 2026 Knowsley Council election.
Leader before election
Graham Morgan
Labour
Leader after election
Graham Morgan
Labour

The 2026 Knowsley Council election took place on Thursday 7 May 2026 to elect members of Knowsley Council in Merseyside, England. They took place alongside other local elections in the United Kingdom. There were 16 of the 45 seats on the council up for election, being the usual third of the council plus a by-election.

Labour retained control of the council, but with a significantly reduced majority.

== Summary ==
=== Background ===
Knowsley Metropolitan Borough Council was created in 1974. Like much of Merseyside, Labour have always performed well in local elections, forming majority administrations for the entirety of the council's existence. The party have always held over 60% of the seats; this includes a period between 2012 and 2016 when every seat was held by Labour.

The Conservatives formed the principal opposition from 1974 to 1994, when they were overtaken by independents. From 1996 to 2012, the Liberal Democrats formed the main opposition. 2021 saw the Green Party overtake the Liberal Democrats, and they have formed the principal opposition since.

The seats up for election this year were last contested in 2022. That election saw Labour take 10 seats (down two), the Greens take 2 (up 1), independents take 2 (up 1), and the Liberal Democrats take 1 (steady).

=== Electoral process ===
The council elects its councillors in thirds, with a third being up for election in three years out of every four, with no election in the fourth year. One seat in each of the borough's fifteen wards was up for election in 2026, being the class of councillors last elected in 2022, with an additional seat contested in Roby ward following the resignation of a sitting councillor. The election was held using first-past-the-post voting, with electors able to vote for one candidate in each of the fourteen single-member wards, or up to two candidates in Roby.

All registered electors (British, Irish, Commonwealth and European Union citizens) living in Knowsley aged 18 or over were entitled to vote in the election. People who live at two addresses in different councils, such as university students with different term-time and holiday addresses, are entitled to be registered for and vote in elections in both local authorities. Voting in-person at polling stations took place from 07:00 to 22:00 on election day, and voters were able to apply for postal votes or proxy votes in advance of the election.

=== Election result ===
Knowsley Council composition following election

2026 Knowsley Metropolitan Borough Council election
| Party | This election | | | | Full council | | | This election | | |
| Party | Candidates | Seats | Net | Seats % | Other | Total | Total % | Votes | Votes % | +/− |
|---|---|---|---|---|---|---|---|---|---|---|
| Labour | {{{candidates}}} | 4 | ▼6 | 25.0 | 20 | 24 | 53.3 | 11,790 | 31.3 | –31.8 |
| Green | {{{candidates}}} | 3 | Steady | 18.8 | 5 | 8 | 17.8 | 8,324 | 22.1 | –0.9 |
| Independent | {{{candidates}}} | 4 | ▲2 | 25.0 | 2 | 6 | 13.3 | 4,261 | 11.3 | +1.6 |
| Reform | {{{candidates}}} | 4 | ▲4 | 25.0 | 0 | 4 | 8.9 | 11,429 | 30.4 | +30.0 |
| Liberal Democrats | {{{candidates}}} | 1 | Steady | 6.3 | 2 | 3 | 6.7 | 1,059 | 2.8 | –1.0 |
| TUSC | {{{candidates}}} | 0 | Steady | 0.0 | 0 | 0 | 0.0 | 409 | 1.1 | +0.2 |
| Conservative | {{{candidates}}} | 0 | Steady | 0.0 | 0 | 0 | 0.0 | 374 | 1.0 | –0.3 |

== Council composition ==
| After 2024 election | | Before 2026 election | | After 2026 election | |
| Party | Seats | Party | Seats | Party | Seats |
|---|---|---|---|---|---|
| Labour | 31 | Labour | 30 | Labour | 24 |
| Green | 7 | Green | 7 | Green | 8 |
| Liberal Democrats | 3 | Liberal Democrats | 3 | Liberal Democrats | 3 |
| Independent | 4 | Independent | 4 | Independent | 6 |
| Reform | - | Reform | - | Reform | 4 |
| Vacant | N/A | Vacant | 1 | Vacant | N/A |

== Incumbents ==
| Ward | Incumbent councillor | Party | Re-standing |
|---|---|---|---|
| Cherryfield | David Lonergan | Labour | No |
| Halewood North | Terry Powell | Labour | Yes |
| Halewood South | Joanne Harvey | Independent | Yes |
| Northwood | Harry Bell | Labour | No |
| Page Moss | Robert Austin | Labour | Yes |
| Prescot North | Frances Wynn | Liberal Democrats | Yes |
| Prescot South | Kai Taylor | Green | Yes |
| Roby | Kevin Bannon | Labour | Yes |
| Shevington | Tommy Rowe | Labour | Yes |
| St Gabriels | Cath Golding | Green | Yes |
| St Michaels | Tony Ely | Labour | No |
| Stockbridge | Dennis Baum | Labour | Yes |
| Swanside | Colin Dever | Labour | Yes |
| Whiston & Cronton | Denise Allen | Labour | Yes |
| Whitefield | Brian Johns (Note: Elected at the 2024 Whitefield by-election.) | Independent | Yes |

== Ward results ==
Councillors that were standing for re-election are marked with an asterisk (*).

=== Cherryfield ===
Cherryfield
| Party | Candidate | Votes | % | ±% |
|---|---|---|---|---|
| Independent | David Hitchmough | 628 | 30.9 | N/A |
| Reform | Josie Annesley | 605 | 29.8 | N/A |
| Labour Co-op | Louise Harbour | 572 | 28.1 | N/A |
| Green | Ebony Higham | 227 | 11.2 | N/A |
| Majority | | 23 | 1.1 | |
| Turnout | | 2,041 | 25.7 | +5.4 |
| Registered electors | | ~7,938 | | |
| Independent gain from Labour | | | | |

=== Halewood North ===
Halewood North
| Party | Candidate | Votes | % | ±% |
|---|---|---|---|---|
| Reform | Brian Beddows | 765 | 28.4 | N/A |
| Labour | Terry Powell* | 708 | 26.3 | –37.2 |
| Green | Kian Houltram | 562 | 20.9 | N/A |
| Independent | David Hooton | 553 | 20.6 | N/A |
| Conservative | Mark Salmon | 101 | 3.8 | N/A |
| Majority | | 57 | 2.1 | |
| Turnout | | 2,694 | 33.1 | +8.9 |
| Registered electors | | ~8,148 | | |
| Reform gain from Labour | | | | |

=== Halewood South ===
Halewood South
| Party | Candidate | Votes | % | ±% |
|---|---|---|---|---|
| Independent | Joanne Harvey* | 1,204 | 44.8 | –9.9 |
| Labour | Peter Bradley | 750 | 29.2 | N/A |
| Reform | Paula Johnson | 617 | 24.0 | N/A |
| Majority | | 454 | 17.7 | |
| Turnout | | 2,577 | 28.7 | +3.4 |
| Registered electors | | ~8,990 | | |
| Independent hold | | | | |

=== Northwood ===
Northwood
| Party | Candidate | Votes | % | ±% |
|---|---|---|---|---|
| Reform | Alexander Hitchmough | 849 | 40.0 | N/A |
| Labour | Marie Roughley | 583 | 27.5 | N/A |
| TUSC | Neill Dunne | 409 | 19.3 | +1.1 |
| Green | David Matthew Kirwan | 271 | 12.8 | +2.1 |
| Majority | | 266 | 12.6 | |
| Turnout | | 2,120 | 24.4 | +5.3 |
| Registered electors | | ~8,691 | | |
| Reform gain from Labour | | | | |

=== Page Moss ===
Page Moss
| Party | Candidate | Votes | % | ±% |
|---|---|---|---|---|
| Green | Ria Rembadi | 703 | 37.6 | +9.8 |
| Labour Co-op | Robert Austin* | 593 | 31.7 | –34.7 |
| Reform | Jacob Maguire | 574 | 30.7 | N/A |
| Majority | | 110 | 5.9 | |
| Turnout | | 1,887 | 21.3 | +1.2 |
| Registered electors | | ~8,863 | | |
| Green gain from Labour | | | | |

=== Prescot North ===
Prescot North
| Party | Candidate | Votes | % | ±% |
|---|---|---|---|---|
| Liberal Democrats | Frances Wynn* | 1,059 | 36.2 | –14.4 |
| Reform | Tony Cummins | 980 | 33.5 | N/A |
| Labour | Tommy Grierson | 770 | 26.4 | –17.0 |
| Conservative | Peter Stanley Leadbeater | 113 | 3.9 | N/A |
| Majority | | 79 | 2.7 | |
| Turnout | | 2,940 | 31.5 | +5.7 |
| Registered electors | | ~9,335 | | |
| Liberal Democrats hold | | | | |

=== Prescot South ===
Prescot South
| Party | Candidate | Votes | % | ±% |
|---|---|---|---|---|
| Green | Kai Taylor* | 1,212 | 50.5 | –8.4 |
| Reform | Mark John Phillips | 658 | 27.4 | N/A |
| Labour | Diane Sedman | 448 | 18.7 | N/A |
| Conservative | Martins Otaniyen Iserhienrhien | 82 | 3.4 | N/A |
| Majority | | 554 | 23.1 | |
| Turnout | | 2,406 | 32.7 | +3.0 |
| Registered electors | | ~7,362 | | |
| Green hold | | | | |

=== Roby ===
Roby (2 seats due to by-election)
| Party | Candidate | Votes | % | ±% |
|---|---|---|---|---|
| Labour | Kevin Bannon* | 1,237 | 45.6 | –4.6 |
| Labour Co-op | Gary See | 959 | 35.3 | N/A |
| Green | Ste Murray | 833 | 30.7 | N/A |
| Reform | Sue Cockerill | 814 | 30.0 | N/A |
| Reform | Gary Robertson | 804 | 29.6 | N/A |
| Green | Alan McKenzie | 781 | 28.8 | N/A |
| Turnout | | ~2,726 | 37.9 | +5.4 |
| Registered electors | | ~7,199 | | |
| Labour hold | | | | |
| Labour gain from Green | | | | |

The additional Roby vacancy arose after Green councillor Paul Woodruff resigned on 17 March 2026, citing the deaths of both his parents and treatment for a serious health condition.

=== Shevington ===
Shevington
| Party | Candidate | Votes | % | ±% |
|---|---|---|---|---|
| Independent | Steve Guy | 870 | 38.5 | N/A |
| Labour | Tommy Rowe* | 610 | 27.0 | –37.5 |
| Reform | Claire Louise Morton | 568 | 25.1 | N/A |
| Green | Lee Verdun Clark | 211 | 9.3 | N/A |
| Majority | | 260 | 11.5 | |
| Turnout | | 2,261 | 27.6 | +4.6 |
| Registered electors | | ~8,185 | | |
| Independent gain from Labour | | | | |

=== St Gabriels ===
St Gabriels
| Party | Candidate | Votes | % | ±% |
|---|---|---|---|---|
| Green | Cath Golding* | 958 | 43.8 | –8.7 |
| Reform | Alan James Cockerill | 693 | 31.7 | N/A |
| Labour | Vanessa Boateng | 535 | 24.5 | N/A |
| Majority | | 265 | 12.1 | |
| Turnout | | 2,198 | 30.4 | +3.5 |
| Registered electors | | ~7,238 | | |
| Green hold | | | | |

=== St Michaels ===
St Michaels
| Party | Candidate | Votes | % | ±% |
|---|---|---|---|---|
| Labour Co-op | Matt Costello | 862 | 47.1 | N/A |
| Reform | Cameron McClymont | 611 | 33.4 | N/A |
| Green | Crispin Evans | 359 | 19.6 | N/A |
| Majority | | 251 | 13.7 | |
| Turnout | | 1,842 | 26.7 | +3.0 |
| Registered electors | | ~6,887 | | |
| Labour hold | | | | |

=== Stockbridge ===
Stockbridge
| Party | Candidate | Votes | % | ±% |
|---|---|---|---|---|
| Reform | Josh Culley | 802 | 39.1 | N/A |
| Green | Lauren Buckley | 596 | 29.1 | N/A |
| Labour | Dennis Baum* | 574 | 28.0 | –51.6 |
| Conservative | Olusoji Obayemi Arosanyin | 78 | 3.8 | N/A |
| Majority | | 206 | 10.0 | |
| Turnout | | 2,060 | 23.2 | +5.8 |
| Registered electors | | ~8,874 | | |
| Reform gain from Labour | | | | |

=== Swanside ===
Swanside
| Party | Candidate | Votes | % | ±% |
|---|---|---|---|---|
| Labour | Colin Dever* | 1,187 | 51.6 | –28.4 |
| Reform | Stephen Dunne | 678 | 29.5 | N/A |
| Green | Ant Canavan | 434 | 18.9 | N/A |
| Majority | | 509 | 22.1 | |
| Turnout | | 2,308 | 30.7 | +3.3 |
| Registered electors | | ~7,513 | | |
| Labour hold | | | | |

=== Whiston & Cronton ===
Whiston & Cronton
| Party | Candidate | Votes | % | ±% |
|---|---|---|---|---|
| Reform | David Gilbertson | 920 | 36.3 | N/A |
| Green | Sandra Gaffney | 865 | 34.1 | N/A |
| Labour | Denise Allen* | 752 | 29.6 | –24.0 |
| Majority | | 55 | 2.2 | |
| Turnout | | 2,558 | 31.6 | +1.9 |
| Registered electors | | ~8,105 | | |
| Reform gain from Labour | | | | |

=== Whitefield ===
Whitefield
| Party | Candidate | Votes | % | ±% |
|---|---|---|---|---|
| Independent | Brian Johns* | 1,006 | 44.8 | N/A |
| Labour | Robert Owens | 650 | 28.9 | N/A |
| Reform | Claude Chonzi | 591 | 26.3 | N/A |
| Majority | | 356 | 15.8 | |
| Turnout | | 2,259 | 28.0 | Steady |
| Registered electors | | ~8,054 | | |
| Independent hold | | | | |
