= 2014 Knowsley Metropolitan Borough Council election =

2014 UK local government election

Results of the 2014 Knowsley Metropolitan Borough Council election

The 2014 Knowsley Metropolitan Borough Council election took place on 22 May 2014 to elect members of Knowsley Metropolitan Borough Council in England. This was on the same day as other local elections.

== Election result ==
Knowsley local election result 2014
Party	Seats	Gains	Losses	Net gain/loss	Seats %	Votes %	Votes	+/−
Labour	21							
Liberal Democrats	0							
Conservative	0	0	0	0				
BNP	0							
United Socialist	0							
Independent	0							
Socialist Labour	0							

== Ward results ==
=== Shevington Ward ===
Shevington Ward
Party	Candidate	Votes	%	±%
Labour	Malcolm John Sharp	941	64%	
1st4 Kirkby	Wesley Hayden	537	36%	
Majority		404		
Turnout		1,478	28%	

=== Park Ward ===
Park Ward
Party	Candidate	Votes	%	±%
Labour	John Buchanan Greer	776	54%	
1st4 Kirkby	Matthew Simon Donnelly	654	46%	
Majority		122		
Turnout		1,430	28%	

=== Northwood Ward ===
Northwood Ward
Party	Candidate	Votes	%	±%
Labour	Michael Murphy	898	58%	
1st4 Kirkby	Helen Moss	414	27%	
UKIP	Paul John Forshaw	227	15%	
Majority		484		
Turnout		1,539	28%	

=== Whitefield Ward ===
Whitefield Ward
Party	Candidate	Votes	%	±%
Labour	Doris Jean Keats	890	60%	
1st4 Kirkby	Brian Johns	602	40%	
Majority		288		
Turnout		1,492	30%	

=== Cherryfield Ward ===
Cherryfield Ward
Party	Candidate	Votes	%	±%
Labour	David Mark Lonergan	891	59%	
First For Kirkby	Anthony Barton	607	41%	
Majority		284		
Registered electors		5,603		
Turnout		1,498	27%	
Rejected ballots		0		

=== Kirkby Central Ward ===
Kirkby Central Ward
Party	Candidate	Votes	%	±%
Labour	Marie Ellen Stuart	1,021	67%	
1st4 Kirkby	Geraldine Veronica Robertson	514	33%	
Majority		507		
Turnout		1,535	31%	

=== Prescot West Ward ===
Prescot West Ward
Party	Candidate	Votes	%	±%
Labour	Adam John Flanders	771	45%	
Liberal Democrats	Ian Smith	491	29%	
UKIP		319	19%	
Conservative	Robert Peter Allan Avery	122	7%	
Majority		290		
Turnout		1,703	33%	

=== Prescot East Ward ===
Prescot East Ward
Party	Candidate	Votes	%	±%
Labour	Denise Allen	1,133	75%	
Liberal Democrats	Carl Cashman	387	25%	
Majority		746		
Turnout		1,520	26%	

=== Stockbridge Ward ===
Stockbridge Ward
Party	Candidate	Votes	%	±%
Labour	John Donnelly	982	83%	
Trade Unionists and Socialists Against Cuts	John Lee Newton	111	9%	
English Democrat	Mark George Syme	97	8%	
Majority		871		
Turnout		1,190	27%	

=== Longview Ward ===
Longview Ward
Party	Candidate	Votes	%	±%
Labour	Samuel Lee	908	59%	
Independent	Paul Woods	334	22%	
UKIP	Glynn Anthony Benson	262	17%	
Conservative	Ryan Hitchmough	42	3%	
Majority		574		
Turnout		1,546	24%	

=== Page Moss Ward ===
Page Moss East Ward
Party	Candidate	Votes	%	±%
Labour	Veronica McNeill	unopposed		

=== St. Michael's Ward ===
St. Michael's East Ward
Party	Candidate	Votes	%	±%
Labour	Victoria Ann Lamb	1,116	73%	
UKIP	John David Price	278	18%	
Independent	Peter Michael Forrest	88	6%	
Conservative	Hannah Louise Withey	48	3%	
Majority		829		
Turnout		1,530	29%	

=== St. Bartholomew's Ward ===
St. Bartholomew's East Ward
Party	Candidate	Votes	%	±%
Labour	Christina Maria O’Hare	1,396	86%	
Conservative	David James Dunne	161	10%	
Liberal Democrats	Leslie Gordon Rigby	74	5%	
Majority		1,235		
Turnout		1,631	31%	

=== Swanside Ward ===
Swanside East Ward
Party	Candidate	Votes	%	±%
Labour	Graham Albert Wright	1,377	78%	
UKIP	Malcom William Collins	381	22%	
Majority		996		
Turnout		1,758	33%	

=== Roby Ward ===
Roby Ward
Party	Candidate	Votes	%	±%
Labour	Margaret Alexina Harvey	1,295	64%	
Conservative	Adam William Butler	414	20%	
Independent	John Webster	233	12%	
Liberal Democrats	Samantha Clare Smith	79	4%	
Majority		881		
Turnout		2,021	33%	

=== St. Gabriel's Ward ===
St. Gabriel's Ward
Party	Candidate	Votes	%	±%
Labour	Brian Michael O'Hare	1,061	68%	
UKIP	Michael Currie	339	22%	
Conservative	Emma Jane Freeman	84	5%	
Liberal Democrats	John Loftus Wickham	72	5%	
Majority		772		
Turnout		1,556	30%	

=== Halewood North Ward ===
Halewood North Ward
Party	Candidate	Votes	%	±%
Labour	Edna Finneran	881	66%	
Independent	David Julian Gardner Smithson	455	34%	
Majority		436		
Turnout		1,336	26%	

=== Halewood West Ward ===
Halewood West Ward
Party	Candidate	Votes	%	±%
Labour	Thomas Henry Fearns	unopposed		

=== Halewood South Ward ===
Halewood South Ward
Party	Candidate	Votes	%	±%
Labour	Christina Ann Harris	1.052	66%	
Trade Unionists and Socialist Coalition	Brendan Tyrrell	290	18%	
Conservative	Graham Tubey	143	9%	
Green	Philip Adam Williamson	113	7%	
Majority		762		
Turnout		1,598	29%	

=== Whiston North Ward ===
Whiston North Ward
Party	Candidate	Votes	%	±%
Labour	Pauline Ann Kelly	1,251	83%	
Liberal Democrats	Marjorie Elizabeth Sommerfield	258	17%	
Majority		993		
Turnout		1,509	28%	

=== Whiston South Ward ===
Whiston South Ward
Party	Candidate	Votes	%	±%
Labour	Anthony Newman	1,299	80%	
Conservative	Bernard Carter Neill	317	20%	
Majority		982		
Turnout		1,616	29%	
