= Tony Scoggo =

British actor (1936–2022)

- Born: Anthony Scogings; 6 May 1936; Liverpool, England
- Died: 26 October 2022 (aged 86); Liverpool, England
- Other name: Tony Scoggins
- Occupations: Actor, community worker, councillor, musician
- Years active: 1981–1995 (TV)

Tony Scoggo (born Anthony Scogings; 6 May 1936 – 26 October 2022) was a British actor best known for his role in the television soap opera Brookside. He played Matty Nolan in the series from 1982 to 1992.

Other television roles include Boys from the Blackstuff and Doctor Who (in the serial Terror of the Vervoids).

== Biography ==
After 12 years of seagoing service aboard cruise liners, Scoggo realised the accelerating decline in the industry. Coming ashore, he took a job in ship repairs. With the wages being so low, he supplemented them by becoming a guitar player in a band alongside Tommy Scully on vocals and Brian Edwards (a docker) on bass. Known as the 'Hi-Fi Three', they performed in shows for charity and fundraising for local community activities. It was while having a drink at the Stanley Park Hotel that Ricky Tomlinson was invited to come up and sing with the group. Subsequently, he was invited to join the band, who became 'Hobo Rick & the Hi-Fi Three'.

Scoggo developed an interest in politics while working on the Vauxhall Community Development Project in the early 1970s. During this time, he was director of a Welfare Rights and Advice Centre at the Victoria Settlement, as a result appearing on a 1976 edition of BBC factual series Open Door, assessing the views of tenants and discussing the housing situation. Following this, Scoggo worked in the catering business and became manager of Merseyside Onward Industries. The enterprise involved refurbishing old furniture to be given to those in need and provided employment for young unemployed people, as well as ex-offenders.

Giving up acting in the 1990s, Scoggo became a councillor in Knowsley. As a Labour councillor, he took part in the Knowsley Metropolitan Borough Council elections of 1995, 1999, 2003 and 2004. In 2003, he was Knowsley Council's Cabinet Member for Leisure, Community and Culture.

On 28 October 2022, it was announced on Twitter/X that Scoggo died earlier that week at the age of 86.
