= 1999 Knowsley Metropolitan Borough Council election =

1999 UK local government election

Elections to Knowsley Metropolitan Borough Council were held on 6 May 1999. One third of the council was up for election and the Labour Party kept overall control of the council.

After the election, the composition of the council was:

- Labour 64
- Liberal Democrat 2

== Election results ==
Knowsley local election result 1999
Party	Seats	Gains	Losses	Net gain/loss	Seats %	Votes %	Votes	+/−
Labour	21			-1	95.5	69.4	12,009	
Liberal Democrats	1			+1	4.5	10.7	1,860	
Conservative	0			0	0.0	12.0	2,069	
Independent	0			0	0.0	7.7	1,341	
Socialist Labour	0			0	0.0	0.2	33	

5 Labour councillors won seats uncontested.

== Ward results ==
Cantril Farm
Party	Candidate	Votes	%	±%
Labour	Dennis Baum	342	54.5	
Independent	Peter Muldoon	266	42.4	
Conservative	Geoffrey Allen	20	3.2	
Majority		76	12.1	
Turnout		628	16.8	

Cherryfield
Party	Candidate	Votes	%	±%
Labour	Edward Grannell	501	76.0	
Independent	Norman Harris	158	24.0	
Majority		343	52.0	
Turnout		659	15.2	

Halewood East
Party	Candidate	Votes	%	±%
Labour	William Cartin	896	62.7	
Liberal Democrats	Cecelia Saleemi	318	22.3	
Conservative	Gillian Robertson	215	15.0	
Majority		578	40.4	
Turnout		1,429	19.7	

Halewood South
Party	Candidate	Votes	%	±%
Labour	Thomas Lyons	uncontested		

Halewood West
Party	Candidate	Votes	%	±%
Labour	Thomas Fearns	577	69.8	
Liberal Democrats	David Smithson	250	30.2	
Majority		327	39.6	
Turnout		827	17.9	

Kirkby Central
Party	Candidate	Votes	%	±%
Labour	William Brennan	734	93.4	
Conservative	Charles Brent	52	6.6	
Majority		682	86.8	
Turnout		786	17.4	

Knowsley Park
Party	Candidate	Votes	%	±%
Labour	Anthony Scoggins	630	58.9	
Conservative	Thomas Fagan	439	41.1	
Majority		191	17.8	
Turnout		1,069	21.5	

Longview
Party	Candidate	Votes	%	±%
Labour	Diane Reid	uncontested		

Northwood
Party	Candidate	Votes	%	±%
Labour	Mark Hagan	512	66.7	
Independent	Robert O'Connor	236	30.7	
Conservative	Andrew Pates	20	2.6	
Majority		276	36.0	
Turnout		768	20.6	

Page Moss
Party	Candidate	Votes	%	±%
Labour	Thomas Russell	uncontested		

Park
Party	Candidate	Votes	%	±%
Labour	Robert Crummie	854	72.1	
Independent	John White	258	21.8	
Conservative	Gillian Allen	73	6.2	
Majority		596	50.3	
Turnout		1,185	20.5	

Prescot East
Party	Candidate	Votes	%	±%
Labour	David Friar	516	53.0	
Liberal Democrats	Denis Rimmer	428	43.9	
Conservative	Maria Salman-Roozen	30	3.1	
Majority		88	9.1	
Turnout		974	21.7	

Prescot West
Party	Candidate	Votes	%	±%
Liberal Democrats	Ian Smith	651	50.8	
Labour	Derek McEgan	598	46.6	
Socialist Labour	Carole Whatham	33	2.6	
Majority		53	4.2	
Turnout		1,282	29.0	

Princess
Party	Candidate	Votes	%	±%
Labour	Laurence Nolan	uncontested		

Roby
Party	Candidate	Votes	%	±%
Labour	Graham Morgan	1,013	56.2	
Conservative	Gary Robertson	533	29.5	
Independent	John Webster	258	14.3	
Majority		480	26.7	
Turnout		1,804	26.0	

St Gabriels
Party	Candidate	Votes	%	±%
Labour	James Keight	768	88.7	
Conservative	Susan Ford	98	11.3	
Majority		670	77.4	
Turnout		866	19.5	

St Michaels
Party	Candidate	Votes	%	±%
Labour	Edward Baker	uncontested		

Swanside
Party	Candidate	Votes	%	±%
Labour	Ronald Round	1,102	84.4	
Conservative	Ronald Robinson	204	15.6	
Majority		898	68.8	
Turnout		1,306	21.8	

Tower Hill
Party	Candidate	Votes	%	±%
Labour	Thomas Rossiter	648	92.4	
Conservative	Thomas Lee	53	7.6	
Majority		595	84.8	
Turnout		701	12.6	

Whiston North
Party	Candidate	Votes	%	±%
Labour	Sandria Gaffney	776	78.5	
Liberal Democrats	Ann Whatham	213	21.5	
Majority		563	57.0	
Turnout		989	19.7	

Whiston South
Party	Candidate	Votes	%	±%
Labour	Anthony Newman	981	77.7	
Conservative	Mark Salmon	281	22.3	
Majority		700	55.4	
Turnout		1,262	22.7	

Whitefield
Party	Candidate	Votes	%	±%
Labour	Ann Clarke	561	72.4	
Independent	John Gallagher	165	21.3	
Conservative	Lorna Gough	49	6.3	
Majority		396	51.1	
Turnout		775	14.2	
