= 2007 Knowsley Metropolitan Borough Council election =

2007 UK local government election

Results of the 2007 Knowsley Metropolitan Borough Council election

Elections to Knowsley Metropolitan Borough Council were held on 3 May 2007. One third of the council was up for election and the Labour Party kept overall control of the council.

After the election, the composition of the council was:

- Labour 50
- Liberal Democrat 13

== Election result ==
Knowsley local election result 2007
| Party | Seats | Gains | Losses | Net gain/loss | Seats % | Votes % | Votes | +/− |
|---|---|---|---|---|---|---|---|---|
| Labour | 18 | 0 | 1 | -1 | 78.3 | 57.2 | 13,575 | +0.3% |
| Liberal Democrats | 5 | 1 | 0 | +1 | 21.7 | 30.7 | 7,300 | -2.9% |
| Conservative | 0 | 0 | 0 | 0 | 0 | 7.4 | 1,757 | +2.1% |
| BNP | 0 | 0 | 0 | 0 | 0 | 1.9 | 448 | +1.1% |
| United Socialist | 0 | 0 | 0 | 0 | 0 | 1.2 | 283 | -1.4% |
| Independent | 0 | 0 | 0 | 0 | 0 | 1.0 | 231 | +1.0% |
| Socialist Labour | 0 | 0 | 0 | 0 | 0 | 0.6 | 154 | -0.1% |

5 Labour candidates were uncontested.

== Ward results ==
Cherryfield
| Party | Candidate | Votes | % | ±% |
|---|---|---|---|---|
| Labour | Jayne Aston | uncontested | | |
| Labour hold | | Swing | | |

Halewood North
| Party | Candidate | Votes | % | ±% |
|---|---|---|---|---|
| Liberal Democrats | Sarah Smithson | 590 | 44.0 | −24.8 |
| Labour | Tina Harris | 431 | 32.1 | +0.9 |
| BNP | Tony Ward | 218 | 16.3 | +16.3 |
| Conservative | Karen Turner | 102 | 7.6 | +7.6 |
| Majority | | 159 | 11.9 | −25.7 |
| Turnout | | 1,341 | | |
| Liberal Democrats hold | | Swing | | |

Halewood South
| Party | Candidate | Votes | % | ±% |
|---|---|---|---|---|
| Liberal Democrats | Sue Smith | 613 | 41.1 | +0.5 |
| Labour | Edna Finneran | 610 | 40.9 | +3.3 |
| United Socialist | Andy Tomo | 191 | 12.8 | −9.0 |
| Conservative | Jean Read | 77 | 5.2 | +5.2 |
| Majority | | 3 | 0.2 | −2.8 |
| Turnout | | 1,491 | | |
| Liberal Democrats hold | | Swing | | |

Halewood West
| Party | Candidate | Votes | % | ±% |
|---|---|---|---|---|
| Labour | Norman Hogg | 733 | 66.2 | −7.6 |
| Liberal Democrats | Jimmy Donegan | 283 | 25.5 | +25.5 |
| United Socialist | Eric McIntosh | 92 | 8.3 | −17.9 |
| Majority | | 450 | 40.7 | −6.9 |
| Turnout | | 1,108 | | |
| Labour hold | | Swing | | |

Kirkby Central
| Party | Candidate | Votes | % | ±% |
|---|---|---|---|---|
| Labour | William Brennan | uncontested | | |
| Labour hold | | Swing | | |

Longview
| Party | Candidate | Votes | % | ±% |
|---|---|---|---|---|
| Labour | Diane Reid | 702 | 58.6 | |
| Liberal Democrats | Paul Woods | 495 | 41.4 | |
| Majority | | 207 | 17.2 | |
| Turnout | | 1,197 | | |
| Labour hold | | Swing | | |

Northwood
| Party | Candidate | Votes | % | ±% |
|---|---|---|---|---|
| Labour | Terence Garland | uncontested | | |
| Labour hold | | Swing | | |

Page Moss (2)
| Party | Candidate | Votes | % | ±% |
|---|---|---|---|---|
| Labour | Ken McGlashan | 783 | | |
| Labour | Veronica McNeill | 716 | | |
| Liberal Democrats | Mark Wiggins | 186 | | |
| Liberal Democrats | Les Rigby | 153 | | |
| Turnout | | 1,838 | | |
| Labour hold | | Swing | | |

Park
| Party | Candidate | Votes | % | ±% |
|---|---|---|---|---|
| Labour | Margaret Dobbie | uncontested | | |
| Labour hold | | Swing | | |

Prescot East
| Party | Candidate | Votes | % | ±% |
|---|---|---|---|---|
| Liberal Democrats | Joan McGarry | 657 | 49.5 | −7.9 |
| Labour | Dave Friar | 565 | 42.6 | +0.0 |
| Conservative | Robin Webster | 105 | 7.9 | +7.9 |
| Majority | | 102 | 6.9 | −7.9 |
| Turnout | | 1,327 | | |
| Liberal Democrats hold | | Swing | | |

Prescot West
| Party | Candidate | Votes | % | ±% |
|---|---|---|---|---|
| Liberal Democrats | Margaret Sommerfield | 777 | 45.6 | −11.8 |
| Labour | Phil Foukes | 574 | 33.7 | +1.0 |
| Conservative | Tony Read | 200 | 11.7 | +11.7 |
| Socialist Labour | Steve Whatham | 154 | 9.0 | −0.9 |
| Majority | | 203 | 11.9 | −12.8 |
| Turnout | | 1,705 | | |
| Liberal Democrats hold | | Swing | | |

Roby
| Party | Candidate | Votes | % | ±% |
|---|---|---|---|---|
| Labour | Graham Morgan | 1,260 | 58.6 | +4.9 |
| Conservative | Gary Robertson | 889 | 41.4 | −4.9 |
| Majority | | 371 | 17.2 | +9.8 |
| Turnout | | 2,149 | | |
| Labour hold | | Swing | | |

Shevington
| Party | Candidate | Votes | % | ±% |
|---|---|---|---|---|
| Labour | Thomas Grierson | 647 | 68.9 | |
| Liberal Democrats | John White | 209 | 22.3 | |
| Conservative | Geoffrey Allen | 83 | 8.8 | |
| Majority | | 438 | 46.6 | |
| Turnout | | 939 | | |
| Labour hold | | Swing | | |

St Bartholomews (2)
| Party | Candidate | Votes | % | ±% |
|---|---|---|---|---|
| Labour | Tony Cunningham | 871 | | |
| Labour | Andy Moorhead | 848 | | |
| Liberal Democrats | Mal Swainbank | 465 | | |
| Liberal Democrats | Pete Gresty | 463 | | |
| Turnout | | 2,647 | | |
| Labour hold | | Swing | | |

St Gabriels
| Party | Candidate | Votes | % | ±% |
|---|---|---|---|---|
| Liberal Democrats | Mike Currie | 616 | 46.4 | −9.6 |
| Labour | Diane Oakford | 587 | 44.2 | +0.2 |
| Conservative | Susan Ford | 126 | 9.5 | +9.5 |
| Majority | | 29 | 2.2 | −9.8 |
| Turnout | | 1,329 | | |
| Liberal Democrats gain from Labour | | Swing | | |

St Michaels
| Party | Candidate | Votes | % | ±% |
|---|---|---|---|---|
| Labour | Joan Lilly | 920 | 64.3 | +3.0 |
| Liberal Democrats | Gary Anderson | 510 | 35.7 | −3.0 |
| Majority | | 410 | 28.6 | +6.0 |
| Turnout | | 1,430 | | |
| Labour hold | | Swing | | |

Stockbridge
| Party | Candidate | Votes | % | ±% |
|---|---|---|---|---|
| Labour | Dennis Baum | 721 | 75.7 | |
| Independent | Pop Muldoon | 231 | 24.3 | |
| Majority | | 490 | 51.4 | |
| Turnout | | 952 | | |
| Labour hold | | Swing | | |

Swanside
| Party | Candidate | Votes | % | ±% |
|---|---|---|---|---|
| Labour | Robert Maguire | uncontested | | |
| Labour hold | | Swing | | |

Whiston North
| Party | Candidate | Votes | % | ±% |
|---|---|---|---|---|
| Labour | Ron Gaffney | 776 | 53.0 | +1.5 |
| Liberal Democrats | Gerry Donnelly | 514 | 35.1 | −13.4 |
| Conservative | Louise Parry | 175 | 11.9 | +11.9 |
| Majority | | 262 | 17.9 | +14.9 |
| Turnout | | 1,465 | | |
| Labour hold | | Swing | | |

Whiston South
| Party | Candidate | Votes | % | ±% |
|---|---|---|---|---|
| Labour | Vince Cullen | 913 | 54.3 | +3.1 |
| Liberal Democrats | Yvonne Southern | 769 | 45.7 | −3.1 |
| Majority | | 144 | 8.6 | +6.2 |
| Turnout | | 1,682 | | |
| Labour hold | | Swing | | |

Whitefield
| Party | Candidate | Votes | % | ±% |
|---|---|---|---|---|
| Labour | Norman Keats | 918 | 80.0 | +17.5 |
| BNP | Gary Aronsson | 230 | 20.0 | +5.2 |
| Majority | | 688 | 60.0 | +20.2 |
| Turnout | | 1,148 | | |
| Labour hold | | Swing | | |
