= 2004 Knowsley Metropolitan Borough Council election =

2004 UK local government election

Results of the 2004 Knowsley Metropolitan Borough Council election

Elections to Knowsley Metropolitan Borough Council were held on 10 June 2004. The whole council was up for election with boundary changes since the last election in 2003 reducing the number of councillors by three. The Labour Party kept overall control of the council. Overall turnout was 33.7%.

== Election result ==
Knowsley local election result 2004
Party	Seats	Gains	Losses	Net gain/loss	Seats %	Votes %	Votes	+/−
Labour	52			-3	82.5	60.0	48,652	-2.9%
Liberal Democrats	11			0	17.5	33.4	27,088	+5.4%
Conservative	0			0	0	3.0	2,471	-2.5%
Independent	0			0	0	1.4	1,137	+0.0%
Socialist Labour	0			0	0	1.2	979	+0.5%
Green	0			0	0	0.8	675	-0.3%
BNP	0			0	0	0.2	147	-0.2%

6 Labour councillors were uncontested.

== Ward results ==
Cherryfield (3)
Party	Candidate	Votes	%	±%
Labour	Jayne Aston	uncontested		
Labour	Edward Grannell	uncontested		
Labour	Daniel Smith	uncontested		

Halewood North (3)
Party	Candidate	Votes	%	±%
Liberal Democrats	Shelly Powell	857		
Liberal Democrats	Sarah Smithson	849		
Liberal Democrats	David Smithson	834		
Labour	Andrew Moorhead	496		
Labour	Denise Allen	398		
Labour	Robert Whiley	377		
Turnout		3,811	32.6	

Halewood South (3)
Party	Candidate	Votes	%	±%
Labour	Lindsay Moorhead-Taylor	720		
Liberal Democrats	Susan Smith	698		
Labour	William Cartin	696		
Labour	Roy Nicholson	689		
Liberal Democrats	Terence Powell	662		
Liberal Democrats	Keith Rigby	598		
Socialist Labour	Kevin Tyrrell	269		
Socialist Labour	Eric Mcintosh	187		
Socialist Labour	Ian Croft	153		
Independent	Andrew Thompson	126		
Turnout		4,798	34.3	

Halewood West (3)
Party	Candidate	Votes	%	±%
Labour	Bob Swann	999		
Labour	Norman Hogg	998		
Labour	Thomas Fearns	863		
Liberal Democrats	David O'Hara	468		
Liberal Democrats	Cecelia Saleemi	321		
Turnout		3,649	31.2	

Kirkby Central (3)
Party	Candidate	Votes	%	±%
Labour	William Brennan	uncontested		
Labour	Jacqueline Harris	uncontested		
Labour	John King	uncontested		

Longview (3)
Party	Candidate	Votes	%	±%
Labour	Michael Kearns	914		
Labour	Diane Reid	912		
Labour	Samuel Lee	898		
Liberal Democrats	Peter Forrest	416		
Liberal Democrats	Alan Davis	374		
Liberal Democrats	Leslie Rigby	346		
Turnout		3,860	27.0	

Northwood (3)
Party	Candidate	Votes	%	±%
Labour	Edward Connor	761		
Labour	Terence Garland	693		
Labour	Mark Hagan	605		
Liberal Democrats	Patrick Williams	540		
Liberal Democrats	John Robinson	496		
Liberal Democrats	Michael Scully	484		
Turnout		3,579	30.5	

Page Moss (3)
Party	Candidate	Votes	%	±%
Labour	Thomas Russell	882		
Labour	Kenneth McGlashan	804		
Labour	Laurence Nolan	771		
Liberal Democrats	Edward Robb	437		
Liberal Democrats	Mark Wiggins	281		
Liberal Democrats	James Hope	265		
Turnout		3,440	28.9	

Park (3)
Party	Candidate	Votes	%	±%
Labour	Robert Crummie	781		
Labour	Ernest Parker	736		
Labour	David Lonergan	651		
Liberal Democrats	Thomas Rossiter	450		
Liberal Democrats	Teresa McLoughlin	449		
Liberal Democrats	Peter Fisher	435		
Turnout		3,502	31.3	

Prescot East (3)
Party	Candidate	Votes	%	±%
Liberal Democrats	William Sommerfield	847		
Liberal Democrats	Joan McGarry	844		
Liberal Democrats	Joseph McGarry	833		
Labour	David Friar	810		
Labour	Derek McEgan	809		
Labour	Thomas Dolan	771		
Turnout		4,914	36.7	

Prescot West (3)
Party	Candidate	Votes	%	±%
Liberal Democrats	Ian Smith	1,069		
Liberal Democrats	Marjorie Sommerfield	1,044		
Liberal Democrats	John Wynn	1,020		
Labour	Michael Foulkes	686		
Labour	Anthony Scoggins	685		
Labour	Patricia Devlin	679		
Socialist Labour	Stephen Whatham	256		
Socialist Labour	Daniel Croft	114		
Turnout		5,553	39.2	

Roby (3)
Party	Candidate	Votes	%	±%
Labour	Joan Quillaim	1,215		
Labour	Graham Morgan	1,164		
Labour	Christina O'Hare	1,147		
Conservative	Robert Webster	665		
Conservative	Gary Robertson	663		
Conservative	Gillian Robertson	638		
Liberal Democrats	Sharon Fricker	241		
Liberal Democrats	Lee Fricker	227		
Liberal Democrats	Jayne Fricker	224		
Turnout		6,184	43.2	

Shevington (3)
Party	Candidate	Votes	%	±%
Labour	Raymond Halpin	759		
Labour	Thomas Grierson	673		
Labour	Malcolm Sharp	666		
Liberal Democrats	John White	382		
Turnout		2,480	26.1	

St Bartholomews (3)
Party	Candidate	Votes	%	±%
Labour	Margaret Flaherty	932		
Labour	Arthur Murphy	932		
Labour	Anthony Cunningham	916		
Liberal Democrats	Malcolm Swainbank	489		
Liberal Democrats	Ronald Ellis	488		
Liberal Democrats	Mary Estall	462		
Green	Catherine Leidstrom	132		
Green	Paul Monaghan	118		
Turnout		4,469	36.2	

St Gabriels (3)
Party	Candidate	Votes	%	±%
Labour	Brian O'Hare	687		
Labour	Joanne Hedges	664		
Labour	Michael Peers	663		
Liberal Democrats	Frederick Fricker	613		
Liberal Democrats	Katie Farnell	570		
Liberal Democrats	Mahmood Surti	535		
Conservative	Susan Ford	178		
Conservative	Graham Parkin	167		
Conservative	Antony Read	160		
Turnout		4,237	35.6	

St Michaels (3)
Party	Candidate	Votes	%	±%
Labour	Edward Baker	1,229		
Labour	James Keight	1,227		
Labour	Kenneth Keith	1,193		
Liberal Democrats	June Porter	421		
Liberal Democrats	Linda Tennant	374		
Liberal Democrats	Paul Tennant	335		
Turnout		4,779	35.2	

Stockbridge (3)
Party	Candidate	Votes	%	±%
Labour	William Weightman	867		
Labour	Dennis Baum	794		
Labour	Thomas Quirk	793		
Independent	Peter Muldoon	387		
Independent	Ian Williams	318		
Independent	Anthony Rainford	306		
Turnout		3,465	26.8	

Swanside (3)
Party	Candidate	Votes	%	±%
Labour	Ronald Round	1,513		
Labour	Robert Maguire	1,404		
Labour	Graham Wright	1,207		
Liberal Democrats	Margaret Manser	438		
Liberal Democrats	John Neild	402		
Liberal Democrats	Mark Strannigan	355		
Turnout		5,319	40.0	

Whiston North (3)
Party	Candidate	Votes	%	±%
Labour	Sandra Gaffney	862		
Labour	Ronald Gaffney	838		
Liberal Democrats	Michael Lappin	762		
Labour	Michael Murphy	741		
Liberal Democrats	Gerald Donnelly	736		
Liberal Democrats	Paul Petrie	674		
Turnout		4,613	34.3	

Whiston South (3)
Party	Candidate	Votes	%	±%
Labour	George Howard	966		
Labour	Vincent Cullen	932		
Labour	Anthony Newman	901		
Liberal Democrats	Yvonne Southern	771		
Liberal Democrats	Donald Pryde	654		
Turnout		4,224	35.0	

Whitefield (3)
Party	Candidate	Votes	%	±%
Labour	Ann Clarke	906		
Labour	Norman Keats	889		
Labour	Doris Keats	888		
Liberal Democrats	John Gallagher	362		
Liberal Democrats	George Murphy	328		
Liberal Democrats	Angela Williams	328		
Green	James Oakley	227		
Green	Patricia Oakley	198		
BNP	Gary Aronsson	147		
Turnout		4,273	36.5	
