= 2012 Knowsley Metropolitan Borough Council election =

Local council election in North West England

Results of the 2012 Knowsley Metropolitan Borough Council election

Elections to Knowsley Metropolitan Borough Council were held on 3 May 2012. One third of the council was up for election, with councillors elected at the 2008 Knowsley Council election defending their seats this time.

Due to the 'in thirds' system of election, changes in vote share are compared to the corresponding 2008 elections and calculated on that basis. After the election, Labour gained total control of the council, wiping out every Liberal Democrat councillor.

== Ward results ==
=== Cherryfield ward ===
Cherryfield
Party	Candidate	Votes	%	±%
Labour	Ted Grannell	1,014	73.6	+26.1
1st 4 Kirkby	Tony Barton	357	25.9	−10.6
Majority		657	47.7	
Turnout		1,377	25	n/c
Labour hold		Swing		

=== Halewood North ward ===
Halewood North
Party	Candidate	Votes	%	±%
Labour	Shelley Powell	985	71.4	+43.0
Liberal Democrats	Dave Smithson	262	19.0	−31.8
Conservative	Graham Tubey	120	8.7	N/A
Majority		723	52.4	
Turnout		1,380	27	n/c
Labour gain from Liberal Democrats		Swing		

=== Halewood South ward ===
Halewood South
Party	Candidate	Votes	%	±%
Labour	Gary See	987	63.4	+29.7
TUSC	Bren Tyrrell	282	18.1	N/A
Liberal Democrats	Harry Birch	220	14.1	−32.3
Conservative	David Dunne	53	3.4	−2.5
Majority		705	45.3	
Turnout		1,557	29	+2
Labour gain from Liberal Democrats		Swing		

=== Halewood West ward ===
Halewood West
Party	Candidate	Votes	%	±%
Labour	Bob Swann	1,161	87.2	+24.1
Liberal Democrats	Sarah Smithson	79	5.9	−30.2
Conservative	Hannah Withey	76	5.7	N/A
Majority		1,082	81.3	
Turnout		1,331	26	+4
Labour hold		Swing		

=== Kirkby Central ward ===
Kirkby Central
Party	Candidate	Votes	%	±%
Labour	Jackie Harris	1,081	85.1	+30.9
1st 4 Kirkby	Brian Johns	183	14.4	−18.8
Majority		898	70.7	
Turnout		1,271	25	−2
Labour hold		Swing		

=== Longview ward ===
Longview
Party	Candidate	Votes	%	±%
Labour	Tony Harvey	1,362	93.1	+34.3
Liberal Democrats	John Wickham	90	6.2	−34.4
Majority		1,272	86.9	
Turnout		1,463	23	+4
Labour hold		Swing		

=== Northwood ward ===
Northwood
Party	Candidate	Votes	%	±%
Labour	Eddie Connor	909	70.9	−8.4
Independent	Des Delaney	367	28.6	N/A
Majority		542	42.3	
Turnout		1,282	23	+4
Labour hold		Swing		

=== Page Moss ward ===
Page Moss
Party	Candidate	Votes	%	±%
Labour	Dave Tully	1,189	92.6	+14.7
Liberal Democrats	Sam Smith	85	6.6	−14.4
Majority		1,104	86.0	
Turnout		1,284	25	+5
Labour hold		Swing		

=== Park ward ===
Park
Party	Candidate	Votes	%	±%
Labour	Dave Dobbie	N/A	N/A	N/A
Labour hold		Swing		

=== Prescot East ward ===
Prescot East
Party	Candidate	Votes	%	±%
Labour	Derek McEgan	976	63.5	+31.0
Liberal Democrats	Carl Cashman	505	32.9	−25.4
Conservative	Gary Robertson	51	3.3	−5.4
Majority		471	30.6	
Turnout		1,537	27	+1
Labour gain from Liberal Democrats		Swing		

=== Prescot West ward ===
Prescot West
Party	Candidate	Votes	%	±%
Labour	Mike Kearns	819	46.3	+16.3
Liberal Democrats	Ian Smith	667	37.7	−17.8
TUSC	Steve Whatham	172	9.7	N/A
Conservative	Robert Avery	101	5.7	−4.5
Majority		152	8.6	
Turnout		1,769	34	+2
Labour gain from Liberal Democrats		Swing		

=== Roby ward ===
Roby
Party	Candidate	Votes	%	±%
Labour	Chris Bannon	1,469	74.7	+26.9
Conservative	Jonathan Mackie	338	17.2	−24.8
Liberal Democrats	Ann Pearson	142	7.2	−2.5
Majority		1,131	57.5	
Turnout		1,967	33	−3
Labour hold		Swing		

=== Shevington ward ===
Shevington
Party	Candidate	Votes	%	±%
Labour	Ray Halpin	1,069	83.8	+15.3
1st 4 Kirkby	Helen Moss	198	15.5	N/A
Majority		871	68.3	
Turnout		1,275	24	+3
Labour hold		Swing		

=== St. Bartholomew's ward ===
St. Bartholomew's
Party	Candidate	Votes	%	±%
Labour	Andy Moorhead	1,433	87.6	+23.8
Liberal Democrats	Jo Wisely	190	11.6	−23.5
Majority		1,243	76.0	
Turnout		1,636	30	+3
Labour hold		Swing		

=== St. Gabriel's ward ===
St. Gabriel's
Party	Candidate	Votes	%	±%
Labour	Frank Walsh	1,075	71.1	+33.9
Liberal Democrats	Fred Fricker	418	27.6	−26.7
Majority		657	43.5	
Turnout		1,513	29	+3
Labour gain from Liberal Democrats		Swing		

=== St. Michael's ward ===
St. Michael's
Party	Candidate	Votes	%	±%
Labour	Kay Moorhead	1,497	92.0	+26.4
Liberal Democrats	Matt Hughes	116	7.1	−26.0
Majority		1,381	84.9	
Turnout		1,627	31	+6
Labour hold		Swing		

=== Stockbridge ward ===
Stockbridge
Party	Candidate	Votes	%	±%
Labour	Bill Weightman	1,198	91.9	+11.3
National Front	Andrew Brennus	71	5.4	N/A
Liberal Democrats	Les Rigby	30	2.3	−16.3
Majority		1,127	86.5	
Turnout		1,304	28	+8
Labour hold		Swing		

=== Swanside ward ===
Swanside
Party	Candidate	Votes	%	±%
Labour	Ron Round	1,634	90.2	+19.3
Conservative	Samuel Robertson	100	5.5	−10.3
Liberal Democrats	Sharon Fricker	61	3.4	−9.6
Majority		1,534	84.7	
Turnout		1,811	34	+5
Labour hold		Swing		

=== Whiston North ward ===
Whiston North
Party	Candidate	Votes	%	±%
Labour	Sandra Gaffney	1,314	83.3	+35.9
Liberal Democrats	Sophia Smith	146	9.3	−27.6
Conservative	Gillian Robertson	100	6.3	−8.5
Majority		1,168	74.0	
Turnout		1,578	29	+3
Labour hold		Swing		

=== Whiston South ward ===
Whiston South
Party	Candidate	Votes	%	±%
Labour	David Williams	1,347	81.1	+33.5
Conservative	Bernard Neill	170	10.2	N/A
Liberal Democrats	Marjorie Sommerfield	126	7.6	−43.4
Majority		1,177	70.9	
Turnout		1,660	30	+3
Labour gain from Liberal Democrats		Swing		

=== Whitefield ward ===
Whitefield
Party	Candidate	Votes	%	±%
Labour	Ros Smith	925	69.1	+26.2
1st 4 Kirkby	Pauline Pendleton	401	30.0	−11.9
Majority		524	39.1	
Turnout		1,338	27	−2
Labour hold		Swing		
