= 2008 Knowsley Metropolitan Borough Council election =

2008 UK local government election

Results of the 2008 Knowsley Metropolitan Borough Council election

Elections to Knowsley Metropolitan Borough Council were held on 1 May 2008. One third of the council was up for election and the Labour Party stayed in overall control of the council.

Prior to the election, the composition of the council is:

- Labour 50
- Liberal Democrat 13

== Ward results ==
=== Shevington Ward ===
Shevington Ward
Party	Candidate	Votes	%	±%
Labour	Raymond Halpin			
Liberal Democrats	Edwin Kolodynski			
Conservative	Edward Vose			

=== Park Ward ===
Park Ward
Party	Candidate	Votes	%	±%
Labour	David Dobbie	624	62.40	−37.60
Liberal Democrats	John White	376	37.60	+37.60

=== Northwood Ward ===
Northwood Ward
Party	Candidate	Votes	%	±%
Labour	Edward Connor			
Liberal Democrats	Sarah Wynn			

=== Whitefiled Ward ===
Whitefiled Ward
Party	Candidate	Votes	%	±%
BNP	Gary Aronsson	72	4.92	−15.08
Labour	Rosamond Smith	629	42.96	−37.04
1st 4 Kirkby	Jennifer Wharton	613	41.87	+41.87
Liberal Democrats	John Wickham	150	10.25	+10.25

=== Cherryfield Ward ===
Cherryfield Ward
Party	Candidate	Votes	%	±%
Labour	Edward Grannell	634	47.85	−52.15
1st 4 Kirkby	Ann Murphy	487	36.75	+36.75
Conservative	James Nolan	73	5.51	+5.51
Liberal Democrats	Donald Pryde	131	9.89	+9.89

=== Kirkby Central Ward ===
Kirkby Central Ward
Party	Candidate	Votes	%	±%
1st 4 Kirkby	Anthony Barton	443	33.32	+33.32
Liberal Democrats	Peter Fisher	165	12.39	+12.39
Labour	Jacqueline Harris	722	54.29	−45.71

=== Prescot West Ward ===
Prescot West Ward
Party	Candidate	Votes	%	±%
Labour	John Birchall			
Green	Peter Cranie			
Conservative	Antony Read			
Liberal Democrats	Ian Smith			

=== Prescot East Ward ===
Prescot East Ward
Party	Candidate	Votes	%	±%
Labour	David Friar			
Conservative	Suzanne Parry			
Liberal Democrats	William Sommerfield			

=== Stockbridge Ward ===
Stockbridge Ward
Party	Candidate	Votes	%	±%
Liberal Democrats	John Nield			
Labour	William Weightman			

=== Longview Ward ===
Longview Ward
Party	Candidate	Votes	%	±%
Labour	Anthony Harvey			
Liberal Democrats	Paul Woods			

=== Page Moss Ward ===
Page Moss Ward
Party	Candidate	Votes	%	±%
Liberal Democrats	Leslie Rigby			
Labour	Thomas Russell			

=== St Michaels Ward ===
St Michaels Ward
Party	Candidate	Votes	%	±%
Labour	Catherine Moorhead			
Liberal Democrats	Susan Roberts			

=== St Bartholomews Ward ===
St Bartholomews Ward
Party	Candidate	Votes	%	±%
Labour	Andrew Moorhead			
Liberal Democrats	Allison Mountaine			

=== Swanside Ward ===
Swanside Ward
Party	Candidate	Votes	%	±%
Liberal Democrats	Gerald Donnelly			
Labour	Ronald Round			
Conservative	Sheila Webster			

=== Roby Ward ===
Roby Ward
Party	Candidate	Votes	%	±%
Labour	Christine Bannon			
Liberal Democrats	Stephanie Smith			
Conservative	Robert Webster			

=== St Gabriels Ward ===
St Gabriels Ward
Party	Candidate	Votes	%	±%
Conservative	Susan Ford			
Labour	Brian O'Hare			
Liberal Democrats	Kenneth Walsh			

=== Halewood North Ward ===
Halewood North Ward
Party	Candidate	Votes	%	±%
Labour	Christina Harris	388	28.55	−3.55
Liberal Democrats	Shelley Powell	693	50.99	+6.99
BNP	Antony Ward	278	20.46	+4.16

=== Halewood West Ward ===
Halewood West Ward
Party	Candidate	Votes	%	±%
Liberal Democrats	Terence Powell	405	36.39	+10.89
Labour	Bob Swann	708	63.61	−2.59

=== Halewood South Ward ===
Halewood South Ward
Party	Candidate	Votes	%	±%
Liberal Democrats	Henry Birch	691	46.63	+5.53
Labour	Edna Finneran	502	33.87	−7.03
United Socialist	Eric McIntosh	137	9.24	−3.56
Conservative	Joan Read	88	5.94	+0.74
Independent	Andrew Thompson	64	4.32	+4.32

=== Whiston North Ward ===
Whiston North Ward
Party	Candidate	Votes	%	±%
Labour	Sandra Gaffney			
Conservative	Louise Parry			
Liberal Democrats	Steven Yates			

=== Whiston South Ward ===
Whiston South Ward
Party	Candidate	Votes	%	±%
Labour	Lorraine Donovan			
Liberal Democrats	Yvonne Southern			
