= 2003 Knowsley Metropolitan Borough Council election =

2003 UK local government election

Elections to Knowsley Metropolitan Borough Council were held on 1 May 2003. One third of the council was up for election and the Labour Party kept overall control of the council. Overall turnout was 20.7%.

After the election, the composition of the council was:

- Labour 55
- Liberal Democrat 11

== Election result ==
Knowsley local election result 2003
Party	Seats	Gains	Losses	Net gain/loss	Seats %	Votes %	Votes	+/−
Labour	18			-2	78.3	62.9	13,362	+2.0
Liberal Democrats	5			+2	21.7	28.0	5,936	+6.4
Conservative	0			0	0.0	5.5	1,169	-2.0
Independent	0			0	0.0	1.4	288	-3.7
Green	0			0	0.0	1.1	243	+0.7
Socialist Labour	0			0	0.0	0.7	154	-0.1
BNP	0			0	0.0	0.4	83	+0.4

2 Labour councillors were uncontested.

== Ward results ==
Cantril Farm
Party	Candidate	Votes	%	±%
Labour	Anthony Cunningham	uncontested		

Cherryfield
Party	Candidate	Votes	%	±%
Labour	Edward Grannell	786	90.4	+18.7
BNP	Gary Aronsson	83	9.6	+9.6
Majority		703	80.8	+32.2
Turnout		869	20.5	+0.9

Halewood East
Party	Candidate	Votes	%	±%
Liberal Democrats	Shelly Powell	810	52.4	−2.0
Labour	William Cartin	597	38.6	+0.1
Conservative	Gillian Robertson	138	8.9	+1.8
Majority		213	13.8	−2.1
Turnout		1,545	19.8	−5.9

Halewood South
Party	Candidate	Votes	%	±%
Labour	Thomas Lyons	476	67.2	+2.9
Liberal Democrats	Sharon Fricker	232	32.8	+11.7
Majority		244	34.4	−8.8
Turnout		708	16.9	−3.2

Halewood West
Party	Candidate	Votes	%	±%
Labour	Thomas Fearns	564	77.7	+13.8
Liberal Democrats	Cecelia Saleemi	162	22.3	+2.8
Majority		402	55.4	+10.0
Turnout		726	17.0	−5.7

Kirkby Central
Party	Candidate	Votes	%	±%
Labour	William Brennan	577	80.7	−11.5
Liberal Democrats	Michael Scully	138	19.3	+19.3
Majority		439	61.4	−23.0
Turnout		715	16.0	−3.8

Knowsley Park
Party	Candidate	Votes	%	±%
Labour	Anthony Scoggins	488	51.6	−5.7
Conservative	Robert Arnall	236	25.0	−10.1
Socialist Labour	Stephen Whatham	154	16.3	+16.3
Liberal Democrats	Alan Davis	67	7.1	−0.5
Majority		252	26.6	+4.4
Turnout		945	19.2	−3.6

Longview
Party	Candidate	Votes	%	±%
Labour	Diane Reid	456	82.5	−3.2
Liberal Democrats	Leslie Rigby	97	17.5	+3.2
Majority		359	65.0	−6.4
Turnout		553	14.3	−3.9

Northwood
Party	Candidate	Votes	%	±%
Labour	Mark Hagan	uncontested		

Page Moss
Party	Candidate	Votes	%	±%
Labour	Thomas Russell	624	64.9	+8.8
Independent	Edward Robb	288	29.9	−1.8
Green	Catherine Leidstrom	50	5.2	+5.2
Majority		336	35.0	+10.6
Turnout		962	18.5	−5.9

Park
Party	Candidate	Votes	%	±%
Labour	Robert Crummie	811	62.6	−0.4
Liberal Democrats	Peter Fisher	347	26.8	+26.8
Green	James Oakley	137	10.6	+4.6
Majority		464	35.8	−3.1
Turnout		1,295	22.6	−4.1

Prescot East
Party	Candidate	Votes	%	±%
Liberal Democrats	John McGarry	511	58.1	−3.5
Labour	David Friar	368	41.9	+3.5
Majority		143	16.2	−7.0
Turnout		879	19.8	−8.6

Prescot West (2)
Party	Candidate	Votes	%	±%
Liberal Democrats	Ian Smith	725		
Liberal Democrats	Marjorie Sommerfield	689		
Labour	Thomas Dolan	439		
Labour	Jacqueline Friar	392		
Turnout		2,245	24.6	−3.9

Princess
Party	Candidate	Votes	%	±%
Labour	Laurence Nolan	472	87.4	−0.8
Liberal Democrats	John Nield	68	12.6	+0.8
Majority		404	74.8	−1.6
Turnout		540	14.2	−2.9

Roby
Party	Candidate	Votes	%	±%
Labour	Graham Morgan	1,242	66.1	+11.2
Conservative	Gary Robertson	636	33.9	+0.7
Majority		606	32.2	+10.5
Turnout		1,878	26.5	−2.9

St Gabriels
Party	Candidate	Votes	%	±%
Liberal Democrats	Frederick Fricker	633	50.6	+7.0
Labour	James Keight	617	49.4	−3.9
Majority		16	1.2	
Turnout		1,250	28.4	−0.7

St Michaels
Party	Candidate	Votes	%	±%
Labour	Edward Baker	749	81.7	+3.5
Liberal Democrats	June Porter	168	18.3	−3.5
Majority		581	63.4	+7.0
Turnout		917	21.7	−1.6

Swanside
Party	Candidate	Votes	%	±%
Labour	Ronald Round	1,059	76.4	+4.1
Liberal Democrats	Kathleen Lappin	169	12.2	−2.6
Conservative	Robert Webster	159	11.5	−1.4
Majority		890	64.2	+6.7
Turnout		1,387	23.4	−2.1

Tower Hill
Party	Candidate	Votes	%	±%
Labour	Malcolm Sharp	612	73.2	+14.4
Liberal Democrats	Thomas Rossiter	168	20.1	+20.1
Green	Patrica Oakley	56	6.7	+6.7
Majority		444	53.1	+13.2
Turnout		836	13.0	−4.7

Whiston North
Party	Candidate	Votes	%	±%
Labour	Sandra Gaffney	581	62.0	+10.5
Liberal Democrats	William Sommerfield	356	38.0	−10.5
Majority		225	24.0	+1.3
Turnout		937	18.1	−4.6

Whiston South
Party	Candidate	Votes	%	±%
Labour	Anthony Newman	745	65.4	−0.4
Liberal Democrats	Lee Fricker	395	34.6	+11.7
Majority		350	30.8	−12.1
Turnout		1,140	26.9	+3.0

Whitefield
Party	Candidate	Votes	%	±%
Labour	Ann Clarke	707	77.9	−1.5
Liberal Democrats	John Gallagher	201	22.1	+22.1
Majority		506	55.8	−8.7
Turnout		908	16.9	−4.4
