= United Socialist Party (UK) =

British political organisation, formed 2004

The United Socialist Party (TUSP) was a British political organisation formed in 2004.

The party was formed in Liverpool by a number of former Liverpool Dockers who had been active in the strike of 1995–1997. Other leftist groups such as the Revolutionary Democratic Group, WIRFI and International Socialist League became involved and the party experienced ideological and organisational conflicts – as the Socialist Labour Party had before it – between those seeking a more left-wing version of the Labour Party and those aiming to found a multi-tendency revolutionary party.

TUSP stood in local elections between 2006 and 2008, retaining no deposits. From 2010 its role was taken to some extent by the similarly acronymed TUSC (Trade Unionist and Socialist Coalition) which emerged from the Socialist Party's Campaign for a New Workers' Party with which TUSP had been involved. Their website contains no new content since 2009 and the organisation appears to be moribund; however as recently as 2014 TUSC stated that a member of the United Socialist Party had stood for election as part of the coalition.

== Publications ==
=== Periodicals ===
- Unite
- Socialist Studies (2006–)

=== Pamphlets ===
- Unite the Struggles! An Introduction to The United Socialist Party (2005)
