= Wokingham Borough Council elections =

Local government elections in Berkshire, England

Wokingham Borough Council is the local authority for the Borough of Wokingham, a unitary authority in Berkshire, England. Until 1 April 1998 it was a non-metropolitan district.

== Council elections ==
Composition of the council
Year	Conservative	Liberal Democrats (Note: Includes totals for the predecessors of the Liberal Democrats, the Liberal Party and SDP (both of which participated in the Alliance).)	Labour	Independents & Others	Council control after election
Local government reorganisation; council established (52 seats)
1973	24	14	0	14	No overall control
1976	37	8	0	7	Conservative
New ward boundaries (54 seats)
1979	50	4	0	0	Conservative
1980	45	8	1	0	Conservative
1982	46	7	1	0	Conservative
1983	46	7	1	0	Conservative
1984	46	7	1	0	Conservative
1986	39	14	1	0	Conservative
1987	36	17	1	0	Conservative
1988	37	15	2	0	Conservative
1990	37	14	3	0	Conservative
1991	35	17	2	0	Conservative
1992	34	19	1	0	Conservative
1994	34	20	0	0	Conservative
1995	27	26	0	1	No overall control
1996	24	29	0	1	Liberal Democrats
Wokingham becomes a unitary authority; new ward boundaries (54 seats)
1997	31	23	0	0	Conservative
1999	30	24	0	0	Conservative
2000	27	27	0	0	No overall control
2001	27	27	0	0	No overall control
2002	30	22	1	1	Conservative
2003	34	19	1	0	Conservative
New ward boundaries (54 seats)
2004	38	16	0	0	Conservative
2006	41	13	0	0	Conservative
2007	43	11	0	0	Conservative
2008	44	10	0	0	Conservative
2010	43	11	0	0	Conservative
2011	45	9	0	0	Conservative
2012	43	10	0	1	Conservative
2014	44	7	1	2	Conservative
2015	47	5	1	1	Conservative
2016	48	5	1	0	Conservative
2018	42	8	3	1	Conservative
2019	31	16	4	3	Conservative
2021	31	18	3	2	Conservative
2022	26	23	3	2	No overall control
2023	22	26	5	1	No overall control
New ward boundaries (54 seats)
2024	19	27	8	0	No overall control
2026	19	29	5	1 (Note: Green.)	Liberal Democrats

=== Non-metropolitan district elections ===
- 1973 Wokingham District Council election
- 1976 Wokingham District Council election
- 1979 Wokingham District Council election (New ward boundaries)
- 1980 Wokingham District Council election
- 1982 Wokingham District Council election
- 1983 Wokingham District Council election
- 1984 Wokingham District Council election
- 1986 Wokingham District Council election
- 1987 Wokingham District Council election
- 1988 Wokingham District Council election
- 1990 Wokingham District Council election
- 1991 Wokingham District Council election (District boundary changes took place but the number of seats remained the same)
- 1992 Wokingham District Council election
- 1994 Wokingham District Council election
- 1995 Wokingham District Council election
- 1996 Wokingham District Council election

=== Unitary authority elections ===
- 1997 Wokingham District Council election
- 1999 Wokingham District Council election
- 2000 Wokingham District Council election
- 2001 Wokingham District Council election
- 2002 Wokingham District Council election
- 2003 Wokingham District Council election
- 2004 Wokingham District Council election (New ward boundaries)
- 2006 Wokingham District Council election
- 2007 Wokingham District Council election
- 2008 Wokingham Borough Council election
- 2010 Wokingham Borough Council election
- 2011 Wokingham Borough Council election
- 2012 Wokingham Borough Council election
- 2014 Wokingham Borough Council election
- 2015 Wokingham Borough Council election
- 2016 Wokingham Borough Council election
- 2018 Wokingham Borough Council election
- 2019 Wokingham Borough Council election
- 2021 Wokingham Borough Council election
- 2022 Wokingham Borough Council election
- 2023 Wokingham Borough Council election
- 2024 Wokingham Borough Council election (New ward boundaries)
- 2026 Wokingham Borough Council election

== Borough result maps ==
2004 results map

2006 results map

2007 results map

2008 results map

2010 results map

2011 results map

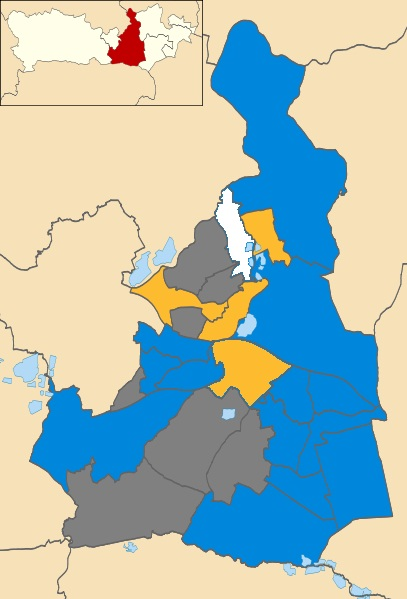
2012 results map

2014 results map

2015 results map

2016 results map

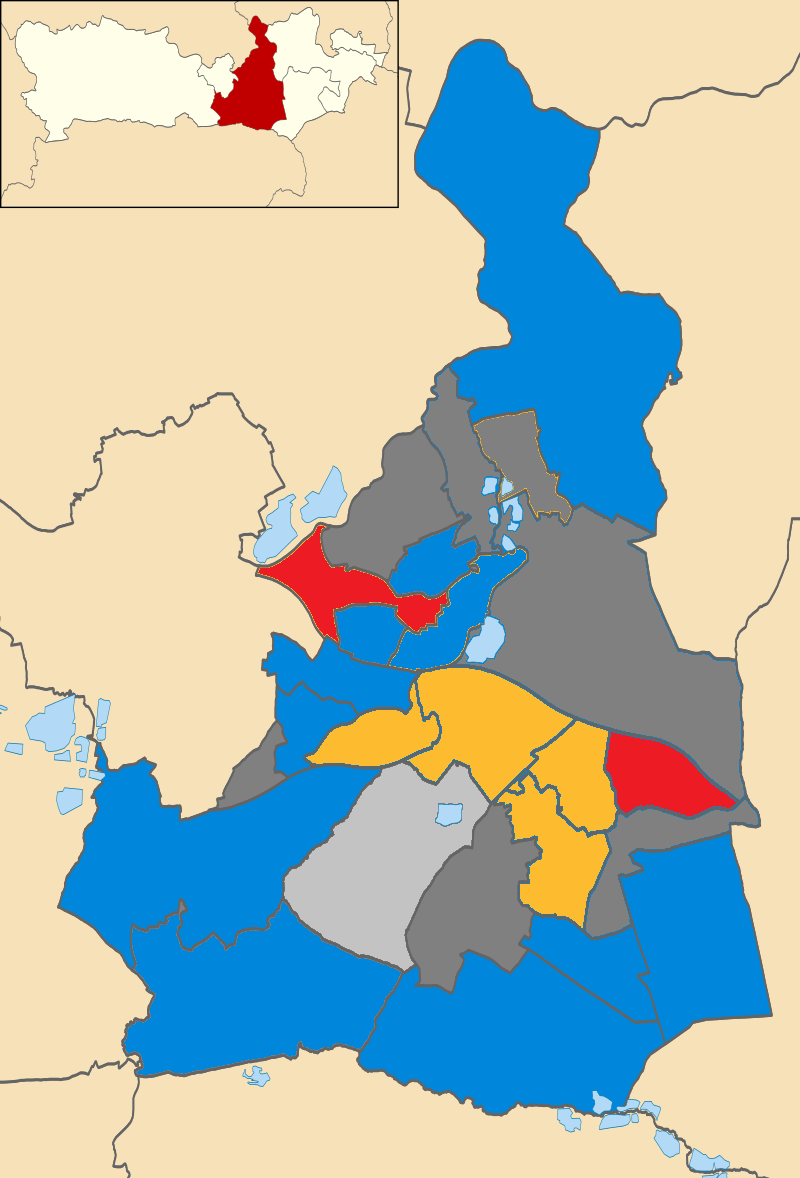
2018 results map

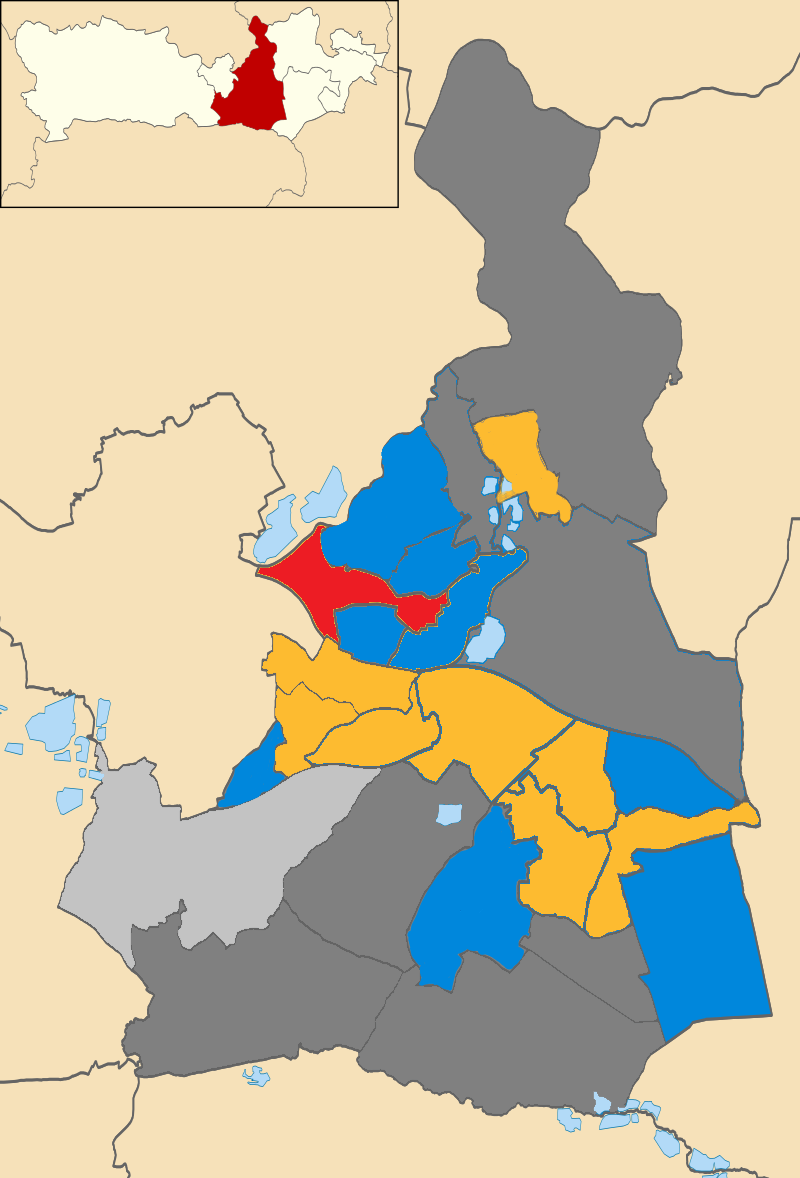
2019 results map

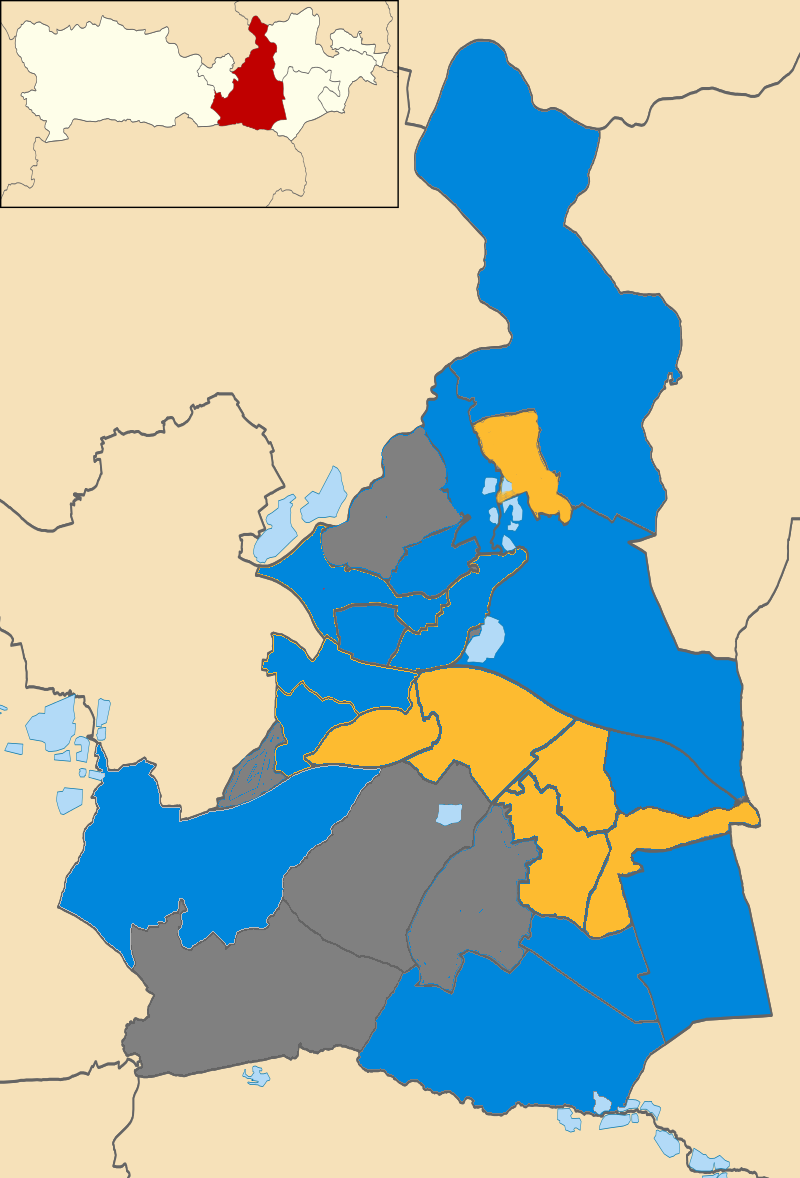
2021 results map

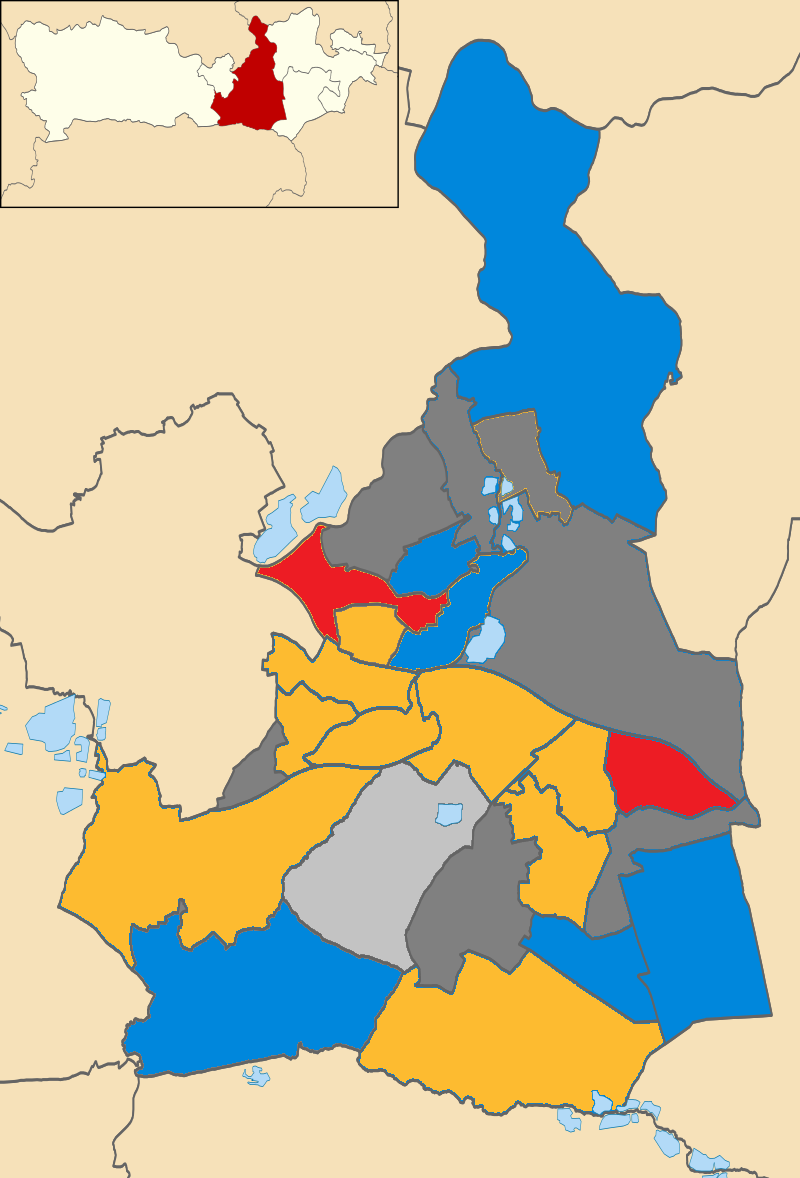
2022 result map

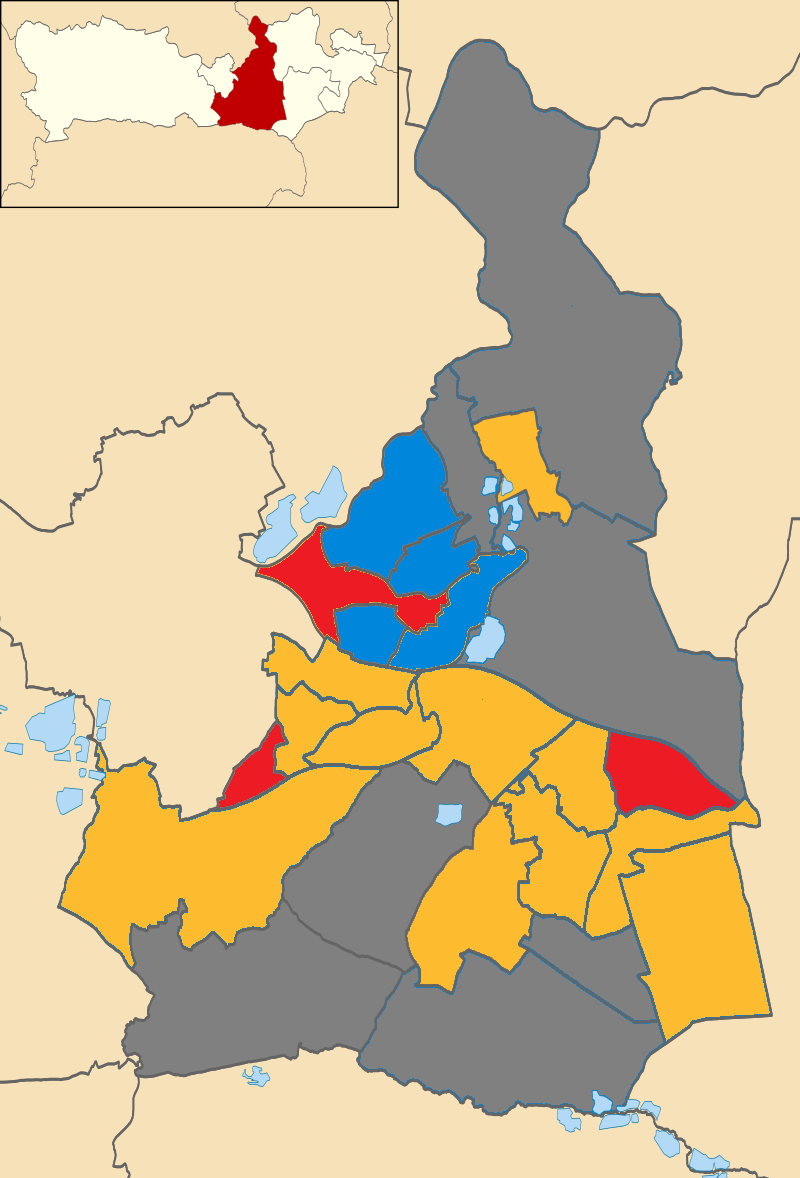
2023 result map

2024 results map

2026 results map

== By-election results ==
=== 1997–2002 ===
Bulmershe By-Election 28 May 1998
Party	Candidate	Votes	%	±%
Liberal Democrats		540	44.3	+2.7
Labour		456	37.4	+3.7
Conservative		222	18.2	−6.5
Majority		84	6.9	
Turnout		1,218	39.6	
Liberal Democrats hold		Swing		

Barkham By-Election 8 November 2001
Party	Candidate	Votes	%	±%
Conservative		303	78.1	−2.8
UKIP		45	11.6	+11.6
Liberal Democrats		40	10.3	−0.8
Majority		258	66.5	
Turnout		388	22.7	
Conservative hold		Swing		

=== 2002–2006 ===
Winnersh By-Election 25 November 2004
Party	Candidate	Votes	%	±%
Liberal Democrats	Malcolm Armstrong	751	51.5	+13.1
Conservative		622	42.6	+1.0
UKIP		86	5.9	−8.5
Majority		129	8.9	
Turnout		1,459	24.0	
Liberal Democrats gain from Conservative		Swing		

Swallowfield By-Election 17 February 2005
Party	Candidate	Votes	%	±%
Conservative	Stuart Munro	405	60.5	−18.3
Independent	Max Bowker	120	17.9	+17.9
Liberal Democrats	Caroline Smith	109	16.3	−4.9
UKIP	Vince Pearson	35	5.2	+5.2
Majority		254	42.6	
Turnout		669		
Conservative hold		Swing		

Maiden Erlegh By-Election 3 November 2005
Party	Candidate	Votes	%	±%
Conservative	Paul Swaddle	1,027	51.0	+8.6
Liberal Democrats	Dave Swindells	835	41.5	+11.5
Labour	Jacqueline Rupert	97	4.8	−5.3
UKIP	David Lamb	55	2.7	−8.1
Majority		192	9.5	
Turnout		2,014	28.2	
Conservative hold		Swing		

=== 2006–2010 ===
Remenham, Wargrave and Ruscombe By-Election 6 December 2007
Party	Candidate	Votes	%	±%
Conservative	John Kersley	913	70.6	−2.9
Liberal Democrats	Martin Alder	237	18.3	−0.5
UKIP	Franklin Carstairs	83	6.4	+2.5
Labour	Brian Scott	60	4.6	+0.8
Majority		676	52.3	
Turnout		1,293		
Conservative hold		Swing		

Coronation By-Election 13 November 2008
Party	Candidate	Votes	%	±%
Conservative	Katherine Povey	850	53.2	+0.0
Liberal Democrats	Coling Lawley	675	42.2	+4.6
UKIP	Amy Thornton	74	4.6	−0.2
Majority		175	11.0	
Turnout		1,599		
Conservative hold		Swing		

Wokingham Without By-Election 4 June 2009
Party	Candidate	Votes	%	±%
Conservative	David Sleight	1,809	67.3	−8.9
Liberal Democrats	David Vaughan	711	26.5	+13.0
BNP	Mark Burke	166	6.2	+6.2
Majority		1,098	40.8	
Turnout		2,686	44.5	
Conservative hold		Swing		

=== 2010–2014 ===
Remenham, Wargrave and Ruscombe By-Election 21 July 2011
Party	Candidate	Votes	%	±%
Conservative	John Halsall	850	65.9	+0.6
Liberal Democrats	Martin Alder	272	21.1	−7.1
Labour	Matthew Dent	94	7.3	+0.7
UKIP	Andy Heape	55	4.3	+4.3
Green	Martyn Foss	19	1.5	+1.5
Majority		578	44.8	
Turnout		1,290	29.4	
Conservative hold		Swing		

=== 2014–2018 ===
Bulmershe and Whitegates by-election 13 November 2014
Party	Candidate	Votes	%	±%
Conservative	Alison Swaddle	726	35.4	+8.5
Labour	Greg Bello	498	24.3	−10.0
Liberal Democrats	Munir Ahmed	448	21.8	+4.1
UKIP	Peter Jackson	275	13.4	−1.6
Green	Adrian Windisch	105	5.1	−1.0
Majority		228	11.1	
Turnout		2,052		
Conservative gain from Liberal Democrats		Swing		

Emmbrook by-election 17 February 2017
Party	Candidate	Votes	%	±%
Liberal Democrats	Imogen Shepherd-DuBey	1,575	59.7	+22.6
Conservative	Kevin Morgan	879	33.3	−4.2
UKIP	Phil Ray	104	3.9	−11.5
Labour	Christopher Everett	79	3.0	−6.9
Majority		696	26.4	
Turnout		2,637	39.7	–3.4
Liberal Democrats gain from Conservative		Swing		

=== 2018–2022 ===
Evendons by-election 7 February 2019
Party	Candidate	Votes	%	±%
Liberal Democrats	Sarah Kerr	1,441	63.1	+16.3
Conservative	Daniel Clawson	729	31.9	−8.8
Labour	Timothy Lloyd	115	5.0	−7.5
Majority		713	31.2	
Turnout		2,294	32.7	−8.3
Liberal Democrats hold		Swing		

=== 2022–2026 ===
Shinfield by-election 5 December 2024
Party	Candidate	Votes	%	±%
Conservative	Jackie Rance	765	49.0	
Labour	Becca Brown	387	24.8	
Liberal Democrats	Chris Johnson	336	21.5	
Green	Gary Shacklady	73	4.7	
Majority		378	24.2	
Turnout		1,561		
Conservative gain from Labour		Swing		

Winnersh by-election 6 February 2025
Party	Candidate	Votes	%	±%
Liberal Democrats	Chetna Jamthe	1,177	52.7	
Conservative	Nick Kilby	833	37.3	
Labour	Parvinder Singh	126	5.6	
Green	Samuel Langlois	99	4.4	
Majority		344	15.4	
Turnout		2,235		
Liberal Democrats hold		Swing		

Maiden Erlegh & Whitegates by-election 5 June 2025
Party	Candidate	Votes	%	±%
Liberal Democrats	Mike Smith	1,028	31.2	3.2
Labour	Andy Croy	793	24.1	−0.2
Conservative	Guy Grandison	788	23.9	−4.2
Reform	Andrew Harris	486	14.8	
Green	Samuel Langlois	180	5.5	−6.2
TUSC	Sara Gillman	17	0.5	
Majority		235	7.1	
Turnout		3,300	39.95	
Liberal Democrats gain from Conservative		Swing		
