= Helen Belcher =

British transgender campaigner and politician

Helen Clare Belcher OBE (born 30 October 1963) is a British transgender activist and Liberal Democrat politician. She has been featured in The Independent on Sunday's Rainbow List for her work on LGBT issues, particularly those affecting the trans community. In 2010 she co-founded Trans Media Watch, a trans-awareness charity for which she appeared on Newsnight. Belcher is a Wiltshire Councillor and the Liberal Democrat parliamentary candidate for Reading West and Mid Berkshire, having previously stood for Parliament in Chippenham.

== Early life ==
Belcher was born in Reading, where she attended Reading School as a fee-paying boarder before graduating from the University of Leeds in 1984. She worked initially as a maths teacher in Boston Spa but later moved into computer software, establishing her own software company in 2004. She is a trans woman who transitioned in 2004.

== Political career and activism ==
In 2012, Belcher gave evidence to the Leveson Inquiry, an investigation into the culture, practices and ethics of the press. She gave evidence again in 2015 for the Women and Equalities Select Committee's inquiry into trans equality, and in 2017 for the Joint Parliamentary Committee of Human Rights' inquiry into free speech.

The Times withdrew from the 2018 Comment Awards when Belcher, a judge on the panel, asked for her name to be removed following the nomination of Janice Turner. It was claimed that Turner had contributed to a number of articles in the press that resisted the Government's proposed reform to the Gender Recognition Act, with Belcher suggesting that trans suicides had increased as a result.

Belcher stood as a Liberal Democrat in the election for the Evendons ward of Wokingham Borough Council in 2016 but lost by 122 votes to the Conservative candidate. Later that year, she was selected as Liberal Democrat parliamentary candidate to replace Duncan Hames in his former constituency of Chippenham, where she was unsuccessful in the 2017 general election against the incumbent Conservative, Michelle Donelan. She was re-selected as Chippenham's Liberal Democrat candidate for the 2019 general election, coming second with 34.5% of the vote.

Belcher was elected to represent the Corsham Pickwick division in the 2021 Wiltshire Council election, winning with 51% of the vote and an 11.94% majority over the second-placing Conservative Party candidate.

In 2023 Belcher was selected as the Liberal Democrat prospective parliamentary candidate for the new constituency of Reading West and Mid Berkshire at the 2024 general election. She came fourth, with 10 per cent of the votes.

Belcher was appointed Officer of the Order of the British Empire (OBE) in the 2023 New Year Honours for services to the transgender community.
