= 2019 Wokingham Borough Council election =

2019 UK local government election

- 2 May 2019

18 seats, one-third of all council seats.
	Con	LD	Lab
Leader	Julian McGhee-Sumner	Lindsay Ferris	Andy Croy
Party	Conservative	Liberal Democrats	Labour
Leader since	14 December 2018.	2016	3 May 2018
Leader's seat	Wescott	Twyford	Bulmershe and Whitegates
Last election	42 seats, 45.1%	8 seats, 31.7%	3 seats, 18.8%
Seats needed	▼15	▲19	▲24
	Ind	Grn	WEP
Leader	N/A		Louise Tomlin
Party	Independent	Green	Women's Equality
Leader since	N/A
Leader's seat	N/A		Running in Evendons
Last election	2 seats, 3.3%	0 seats, 0.6%	New Party
Seats needed	▲25	▲27	▲27
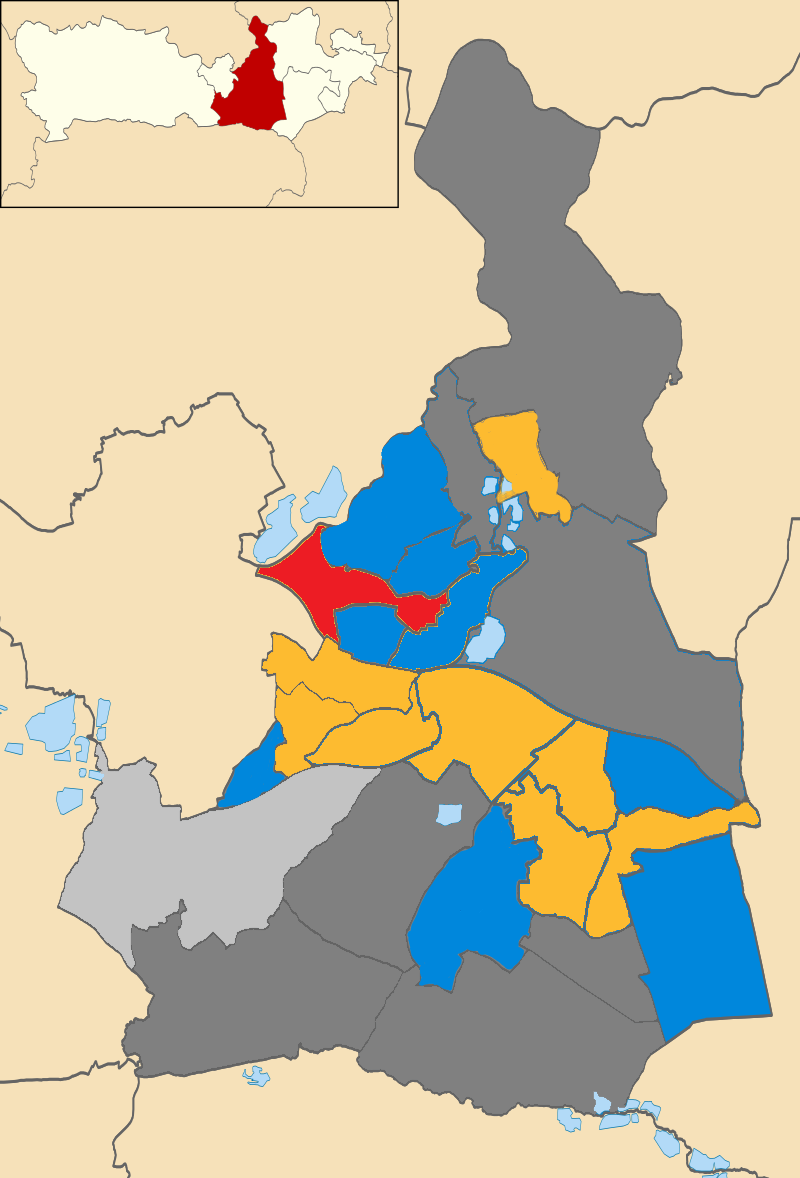
- Ward results map for Wokingham Borough Council
Incumbent Leader of the Council
Julian McGhee-Sumner
Conservative

The 2019 Wokingham Borough Council election took place on Thursday 2 May 2019. That was the same day as other United Kingdom local elections in order to elect members of Wokingham Unitary Council in Berkshire, England. One third of the council was up for election.

Before the election, the composition of the council was:

- Conservative 41
- Liberal Democrat 8
- Labour 3
- Independent 2

== Background ==
Since the previous round of elections in 2018, there had been 1 by-election, in Evendons in February 2019, which had been won by the Liberal Democrats. Richard Dolinski resigned from the Conservative Party to sit as an independent as a result of an internal vote of no confidence being put forward and subsequently passed against Cllr Charlotte Haitham-Taylor which led to her resignation as the Leader of the Council

The composition of the council before the election was as follows:

↓
41	8	3	2
CON	LD	LAB	IND

After the election, the composition of the council became:

↓
31	16	4	3
CON	LD	LAB	IND

== Election result ==
2019 Wokingham Borough Council election
Party	This election				Full council			This election		
Party	Candidates	Seats	Net	Seats %	Other	Total	Total %	Votes	Votes %	+/−
Conservative	{{{candidates}}}	8	▼10	44.4	23	31	57.4	14,625	37.3	–7.8
Liberal Democrats	{{{candidates}}}	8	▲8	44.4	8	16	29.6	15,444	39.4	+7.7
Labour	{{{candidates}}}	1	▲1	5.6	3	4	7.4	6,449	16.4	–2.4
Independent	{{{candidates}}}	1	▲1	5.6	2	3	5.5	1,529	3.9	+3.3
Green	{{{candidates}}}	0	Steady	0.0	0	0	0.0	955	2.4	+1.8
Women's Equality	{{{candidates}}}	0	Steady	0.0	0	0	0.0	156	0.3	New

A total of 39,148 votes were cast for candidates.

== Ward results ==
Barkham
Party	Candidate	Votes	%	±%
Conservative	John Kaiser	457	49.6	▼16.5
Liberal Democrats	Robert Tuck	391	42.4	▲27.9
Labour	Peyman Jahromi	74	8.0	▼3.5
Majority		66	7.2	▼44.4
Turnout		922	33.0	▼38.0
Conservative hold		Swing		

There were 17 spoiled ballots.

Bulmershe and Whitegates
Party	Candidate	Votes	%	±%
Labour	Shirley Boyt	1,227	42.4	▲13.4
Conservative	Mohammed Younis	1,096	37.9	▼0.2
Liberal Democrats	Nigel Harman	570	19.7	▲5.1
Majority		131	4.5	▼4.6
Turnout		2,893	42.0	▼28.0
Labour gain from Conservative		Swing		

There were 49 spoiled ballot papers.

Coronation
Party	Candidate	Votes	%	±%
Conservative	Alison Swaddle	1,076	59.9	▲2.9
Liberal Democrats	Paul Barton	331	18.4	▲3.2
Labour	Ian Hills	194	10.8	▼1.4
Green	Kathy Smith	194	10.8	▲5.1
Majority		745	41.5	▼0.3
Turnout		1,795	42.0	▼33.0
Conservative hold		Swing		

There were 21 spoiled ballot papers.

Emmbrook
Party	Candidate	Votes	%	±%
Liberal Democrats	Rachel Bishop-Firth	1,827	61.6	▲26.9
Conservative	Philip Mirfin	923	31.1	▼12.1
Labour	Brent Lees	216	10.8	▲1.1
Majority		904	30.5	▲22.0
Turnout		2,966	44.0	▼31.0
Liberal Democrats gain from Conservative		Swing		

There were 16 spoiled ballot papers.

Evendons
Party	Candidate	Votes	%	±%
Liberal Democrats	Adrian Mather	1,259	48.5	▲28.0
Conservative	Daniel Hinton	644	24.8	▼26.0
Independent	Lynn Forbes	388	15.0	▲15.0
Women's Equality	Louise Timlin	156	6.0	▲6.0
Labour	Tim Lloyd	147	5.7	▼5.1
Majority		615	23.7	▼6.6
Turnout		2,594	37.0	▼35.0
Liberal Democrats gain from Conservative		Swing		

There were 16 spoiled ballots.

Hawkedon
Party	Candidate	Votes	%	±%
Liberal Democrats	Andrew Mickleburgh	1,353	56.4	▲25.3
Conservative	Tim Holton	764	31.8	▼13.7
Labour	Doreen Osborne	282	11.8	0.0
Majority		589	24.6	▲10.2
Turnout		2,399	36.0	▼32.0
Liberal Democrats gain from Conservative		Swing		

There were 25 spoiled ballots.

Hillside
Party	Candidate	Votes	%	±%
Liberal Democrats	Caroline Smith	1,425	51.2	▲28.5
Conservative	Norman Jorgensen	1,046	37.6	▼12.9
Labour	Hari Sarasan	310	11.1	▼2.2
Majority		379	13.6	▼14.2
Turnout		2,781	44.0	▼28.0
Liberal Democrats gain from Conservative		Swing		

There were 44 spoiled ballots.

Loddon
Party	Candidate	Votes	%	±%
Conservative	Abdul Loyes	1,124	47.9	▼1.0
Liberal Democrats	Carol Jewell	807	34.4	▲16.6
Labour	Mary Young	418	17.8	▲0.9
Majority		317	13.5	▼17.6
Turnout		2,349	33.0	▼36.0
Conservative hold		Swing		

There were 42 spoiled ballots.

Maiden Erlegh
Party	Candidate	Votes	%	±%
Liberal Democrats	Tahir Maher	1,056	37.0	▲19.0
Conservative	David Chopping	968	33.9	▼13.7
Labour	Andrew Gray	830	29.1	▲10.8
Majority		88	3.1	▼26.2
Turnout		2,854	46.0	▼25.0
Liberal Democrats gain from Conservative		Swing		

There were 49 spoiled ballots.

Norreys
Party	Candidate	Votes	%	±%
Conservative	Gregor Murray	1,116	40.5	▼11.2
Labour	Nick Fox	1,081	39.2	▲27.3
Liberal Democrats	Elizabeth Bishop	561	20.3	▲3.3
Majority		35	1.3	▼33.4
Turnout		2,758	37.0	▼32.0
Conservative hold		Swing		

There were 59 spoiled ballots.

Shinfield North
Party	Candidate	Votes	%	±%
Conservative	Parry Batth	300	41.8	▲1.3
Labour	James Reid	280	39.0	▲5.7
Liberal Democrats	Stephen Newton	138	19.2	▲12.0
Majority		20	2.8	▼4.4
Turnout		718	30.0	▼30.0
Conservative hold		Swing		

There were 11 spoiled ballots.

Shinfield South
Party	Candidate	Votes	%	±%
Independent	Jim Frewin	1,141	49.5	▲49.5
Conservative	Anthony Pollock	709	30.8	▼26.4
Labour	Marcus McDowell	229	9.9	▼2.4
Green	Hilary Murdoch	226	9.8	▲2.9
Majority		432	18.7	▼25.1
Turnout		2,305	34.0	▼35.0
Independent gain from Conservative		Swing		

There were 11 spoiled ballots.

Sonning
Party	Candidate	Votes	%	±%
Conservative	Michael Firmager	587	58.8	▼7.0
Green	Brian O'Callaghan	190	19.0	▲8.2
Liberal Democrats	Tom McCann	128	12.8	▲12.8
Labour	Philippa Hills	94	9.4	▼4.0
Majority		397	39.8	▼12.6
Turnout		999	40.0	▼33.0
Conservative hold		Swing		

There were 12 spoiled ballots.

South Lake
Party	Candidate	Votes	%	±%
Conservative	Laura Blumenthal	798	44.2	▲3.5
Liberal Democrats	Beth Rowland	757	42.0	▲11.6
Labour	Tony Skuse	249	13.8	▼1.4
Majority		41	2.2	▼8.1
Turnout		1,804	41.0	▼33.0
Conservative hold		Swing		

There were 27 spoiled ballots.

Twyford
Party	Candidate	Votes	%	±%
Liberal Democrats	Stephen Conway	1,584	73.0	▲34.0
Conservative	John Jarvis	493	22.7	▼18.3
Labour	Charles Wickeden	94	4.3	▼43.9
Majority		1,091	50.3	▲48.3
Turnout		2,171	48.0	▼28.0
Liberal Democrats gain from Conservative		Swing		

There were 19 spoiled ballots.

Wescott
Party	Candidate	Votes	%	±%
Liberal Democrats	Maria Gee	755	35.1	▲17.3
Conservative	Julian McGhee-Sumner	723	33.6	▼17.3
Labour	James Box	503	23.4	▲11.9
Green	Rema Heffernan	173	8.0	▼2.7
Majority		32	1.5	▼31.6
Turnout		2,154	42.0	▼30.0
Liberal Democrats gain from Conservative		Swing		

There were 27 spoiled ballots.

Winnersh
Party	Candidate	Votes	%	±%
Liberal Democrats	Paul Fishwick	1,609	64.7	▲31.6
Conservative	Philip Houldsworth	567	22.8	▼18.8
Green	Stephen Lloyd	172	6.9	▲2.9
Labour	Steve Stanton	140	5.6	▼4.2
Majority		1,042	41.9	▲33.4
Turnout		2,488	34.0	▼33.0
Liberal Democrats gain from Conservative		Swing		

There were 24 spoiled ballots.

Wokingham Without
Party	Candidate	Votes	%	±%
Conservative	Christopher Bowring	1,184	52.1	▼8.9
Liberal Democrats	Jordan Montgomery	893	39.3	▲27.7
Labour	Jayne Donnelly	297	8.7	▲4.7
Majority		291	12.8	▼35.6
Turnout		2,274	37.0	▼37.0
Conservative hold		Swing		

There were 55 spoiled ballots.
