= 2014 Wokingham Borough Council election =

2014 UK local government election

Map of the results

The 2014 Wokingham Borough Council election took place on Thursday 22 May 2014. That was the same day as other United Kingdom local elections in order to elect members of Wokingham Unitary Council in Berkshire, England. One third of the council was up for election and the Conservative Party stayed comfortably in overall control of the council.

After the election, the composition of the council was:

- Conservative 44
- Liberal Democrat 7
- Labour 1
- Independent 2

== Background ==
A total of 79 candidates contested the 18 seats which were up for election. These included 18 Conservative, 18 Liberal Democrat, 14 Labour, 9 Green Party, 18 United Kingdom Independence Party and 1 independent candidates.

Issues in the election included:

- Some recent controversial planning applications

== Election result ==
The Conservatives retained control of the council. The Liberal Democrats held two out of the three seats they defended, retaining their seats in South Lake and Winnersh, but losing a seat in Bulmershe & Whitegates to Labour.

Wokingham local election result 2014
Party	Seats	Gains	Losses	Net gain/loss	Seats %	Votes %	Votes	+/−
Conservative	44	1	0	0	81.0	45.0	17,232	-3.4
Liberal Democrats	7	0	1	0	13.0	19.9	7,640	-4.2
UKIP	0	0	0	0	0.0	17.6	6,750	+14.2
Labour	0	1	0	0	2.0	11.3	4,332	-0.9
Green	0	0	0	0	0.0	5.3	2,046	-2.2
Independent	2	0	1	0	4.0	0.1	71	-1.4

There were a total of 38,275 votes cast, including 204 spoiled ballots.

== Ward results ==
Arborfield
Party	Candidate	Votes	%	±%
Conservative	Gary Cowan	450	58.9	+0.3
Liberal Democrats	Steve Bacon	200	26.2	−8.9
UKIP	Robin Bateson	113	14.8	+8.5
Majority		250	32.7	+9.2
Turnout		763	36.3	
Conservative hold		Swing	+0.3	

Bulmershe & Whitegates
Party	Candidate	Votes	%	±%
Labour	Nicky Jerrome	967	34.2	+5.7
Conservative	Dave Mills	760	26.9	+1.8
Liberal Democrats	Sam Rahmouni	499	17.6	−19.5
UKIP	Peter Jackson	423	14.9	+9.7
Green	Adrian Windisch	173	6.1	+2.1
Majority		207	7.3	−1.3
Turnout		2822	41.8	
Labour gain from Liberal Democrats		Swing	+5.7	

Coronation
Party	Candidate	Votes	%	±%
Conservative	Keith Baker	1171	58.7	−1.4
UKIP	Tony Bartlett	258	12.9	+12.9
Liberal Democrats	Paddy Power	248	12.4	−14.8
Labour	Danny McLaughlin	182	9.1	−3.7
Green	Louise White	133	6.6	+6.6
Majority		913	45.8	+12.9
Turnout		1992	43.6	
Conservative hold		Swing	-1.4	

Emmbrook
Party	Candidate	Votes	%	±%
Conservative	Chris Singleton	1085	37.5	−18.4
Liberal Democrats	Imogen Shepherd-DuBey	1074	37.1	+23.6
UKIP	Mike Spencer	447	15.4	+0.1
Labour	Jeremy Curtis	287	9.9	−4.68
Majority		11	0.3	−40.3
Turnout		2893	43.4	
Conservative hold		Swing	-18.4	

Evendons
Party	Candidate	Votes	%	±%
Conservative	Mark Ashwell	1227	46.7	−3.7
Liberal Democrats	John Bray	598	22.7	+2.6
UKIP	Toby North	437	16.6	+2.2
Labour	Tony Skuse	292	11.1	−3.7
Independent	Kaz Lokuciewski	71	2.7	+2.7
Majority		629	23.9	−6.2
Turnout		2625	36.9	
Conservative hold		Swing	-3.7	

Finchampstead North
Party	Candidate	Votes	%	±%
Conservative	Rob Stanton	1115	60.4	−9.5
UKIP	Jason Murdoch	301	16.3	+16.3
Liberal Democrats	Roland Cundy	198	10.7	+2.5
Labour	Tim Jinkerson	139	7.5	−5.5
Green	Martyn Foss	92	4.9	−3.5
Majority		814	44.1	−12.8
Turnout		1845	41.9	
Conservative hold		Swing	-9.5	

Finchampstead South
Party	Candidate	Votes	%	±%
Conservative	Simon Weeks	1024	56.2	
UKIP	Annette Ellis	357	19.6	
Liberal Democrats	James May	171	9.4	
Labour	Andrew Croy	141	7.7	
Green	Matthew Valler	129	7.0	
Majority		667	39.6	
Turnout		1822		
Conservative hold		Swing	+2.6	

Hawkedon
Party	Candidate	Votes	%	±%
Conservative	Michael Firmager	925	37.8	−5.0
Liberal Democrats	Clive Jones	862	35.2	+10.2
UKIP	John Green	358	14.6	+5.8
Labour	Neville Waites	299	12.2	−5.1
Majority		63	2.5	−15.3
Turnout		2444	34.6	
Conservative hold		Swing	-5.0	

Hillside
Party	Candidate	Votes	%	±%
Conservative	Christopher Smith	1230	45.7	−4.8
Liberal Democrats	Keith Yabsley	620	23.0	+0.9
UKIP	Chris Moore	433	16.1	+16.1
Labour	David Sharp	406	15.0	−0.1
Majority		610	22.6	−5.7
Turnout		2689	41.0	
Conservative hold		Swing	-4.8	

Loddon
Party	Candidate	Votes	%	±%
Conservative	Bill Soane	1009	41.4	+4.7
UKIP	Bill Brooks	493	20.2	+20.2
Liberal Democrats	Tahir Maher	419	17.2	−24.2
Labour	Tom Clark	355	14.4	−0.3
Green	Julia Titus	159	6.5	+0.1
Majority		516	21.1	16.5
Turnout		2435	34.6	
Conservative gain from Independent		Swing	+4.7	

Maiden Erlegh
Party	Candidate	Votes	%	±%
Conservative	Paul Swaddle	1045	39.7	−5.8
Liberal Democrats	David Hare	502	19.0	−5.9
Labour	Jacqueline Rupert	418	15.8	−1.8
UKIP	Philip Ray	399	15.1	+15.1
Green	Russell Seymour	266	10.1	−1.1
Majority		543	20.6	0.0
Turnout		2630	34.2	
Conservative hold		Swing	-5.8	

Norreys
Party	Candidate	Votes	%	±%
Conservative	David Lee	1080	41.5	−7.3
UKIP	Philip Cunnington	567	21.8	+11.1
Liberal Democrats	Steven Scarrott	486	18.6	+5.0
Labour	Paul Sharples	285	10.9	+5.1
Green	Emma Louise Hamilton	181	6.9	+0.8
Majority		513	19.7	−13
Turnout		2599	36.6	
Conservative hold		Swing	-7.3	

Remenham, Wargrave and Ruscombe
Party	Candidate	Votes	%	±%
Conservative	Robert Pitts	1013	61.9	−6.6
UKIP	Andy Heape	269	16.4	+16.4
Liberal Democrats	Martin George Alder	197	12.0	−6.1
Labour	Stuart Crainer	155	9.4	−3.1
Majority		744	45.5	−4.9
Turnout		1634	36.5	
Conservative hold		Swing	-6.6	

Shinfield South
Party	Candidate	Votes	%	±%
Conservative	Barrie Patman	952	52.2	−6.4
UKIP	Barry Hadfield	414	22.8	+22.8
Green	John Prior	241	13.3	−17.8
Liberal Democrats	Keith Malvern	202	11.1	+1.9
Majority		538	29.7	+2.9
Turnout		1809	32.7	
Conservative hold		Swing	-6.4	

South Lake
Party	Candidate	Votes	%	±%
Liberal Democrats	Beth Rowland	535	33.8	−10.5
Conservative	Laura Blumenthal	462	29.2	−3.2
UKIP	Timothy Robinson	275	17.4	+17.4
Labour	Ian Hills	222	14.0	−2.9
Green	Pamela Prior	85	5.3	−1.1
Majority		73	4.6	−7.3
Turnout		1579	38.7	
Liberal Democrats hold		Swing	-10.5	

Swallowfield
Party	Candidate	Votes	%	±%
Conservative	Stuart Munro	558	57.4	+2.6
UKIP	Max Bowker	217	22.3	+7.6
Green	Thomas Blomley	118	12.1	+12.1
Liberal Democrats	Caroline Smith	79	8.1	−16.3
Majority		341	35.0	−1.6
Turnout		972	41.4	
Conservative hold		Swing	+2.6	

Winnersh
Party	Candidate	Votes	%	±%
Liberal Democrats	Prue Bray	1474	53.1	+6.1
Conservative	Lee Gordon Walker	711	25.6	−12.6
UKIP	Tony Hannington	405	14.5	+7.3
Labour	Steve Stanton	184	6.6	−0.3
Majority		763	27.5	+18.7
Turnout		2774	37.5	
Liberal Democrats hold		Swing	+6.1	

Wokingham Without
Party	Candidate	Votes	%	±%
Conservative	Angus Ross	1,415	56.9	−9.1
UKIP	Marcus Ellis	584	22.2	+5.8
Labour	Penelope O'Neil	311	12.5	+12.5
Liberal Democrats	Anthony Vick	176	7.0	−0.6
Majority		831	33.4	−2.4
Turnout		2486	39.6	
Conservative hold		Swing	-9.1	
