= 2011 Wokingham Borough Council election =

2011 UK local government election

Map of the results of the 2011 Wokingham council election. Conservatives in blue and Liberal Democrats in yellow. Wards in grey were not contested in 2011.

The 2011 Wokingham Borough Council election took place on 5 May 2011 to elect members of Wokingham Unitary Council in Berkshire, England. One third of the council was up for election and the Conservative Party stayed in overall control of the council.

After the election, the composition of the council was:

- Conservative 45
- Liberal Democrat 9

== Background ==
A total of 72 candidates contested the 18 seats which were up for election. These were 18 Conservative, 17 Liberal Democrat, 16 Labour, 10 Green Party, 10 UK Independence Party and 1 independent candidates. Councillors standing down at the election included Conservatives Pam Stubbs and Steve Chapman from Barkham and Sonning wards respectively.

Issues in the election included plans for a new supermarket and traffic congestion.

== Election result ==
The results saw the Conservatives hold control of the council after gaining 2 seats from the Liberal Democrats to have 45 of the 54 seats. The Liberal Democrats were reduced to 9 seats after the party lost 2 of the 4 seats they had been defending in Bulmershe and Whitegates and Winnersh. The Conservatives held all 14 seats they had been defending and among the winners for the party was Abdul Loyes, who returned to the council for Loddon one year after losing his seat there.

The Liberal Democrat leader on the council, Pru Bray, put the defeats down to national events, with the party being part of the national coalition government. Meanwhile, the Conservative leader of the council, David Lee, described the results as "brilliant" and attributed them to "hard work" in the campaign and over the previous year.

Wokingham local election result 2011
Party	Seats	Gains	Losses	Net gain/loss	Seats %	Votes %	Votes	+/−
Conservative	16	2	0	+2	88.9	52.4	23,459	+1.5%
Liberal Democrats	2	0	2	-2	11.1	25.6	11,449	-9.7%
Labour	0	0	0	0	0	13.3	5,967	+5.1%
Green	0	0	0	0	0	4.3	1,913	+2.6%
UKIP	0	0	0	0	0	3.9	1,726	+0.2%
Independent	0	0	0	0	0	0.6	283	+0.6%

== Ward results ==
Barkham
Party	Candidate	Votes	%	±%
Conservative	John Kaiser	745	65.5	−10.9
Liberal Democrats	Stephen Bacon	393	34.5	+15.8
Majority		352	30.9	−26.8
Turnout		1,138		
Conservative hold		Swing		

Bulmershe and Whitegates
Party	Candidate	Votes	%	±%
Conservative	Shahid Younis	1,154	36.5	+1.2
Liberal Democrats	Lesley Hayward	1,050	33.2	−4.9
Labour	Kyriakos Fiakkas	661	20.9	+1.7
UKIP	Peter Jackson	176	5.6	+0.9
Green	Adrian Windisch	121	3.8	+1.0
Majority		104	3.3	
Turnout		3,162		
Conservative gain from Liberal Democrats		Swing		

Coronation
Party	Candidate	Votes	%	±%
Conservative	Kate Haines	1,403	60.1	+7.3
Liberal Democrats	Paddy Power	634	27.2	−4.2
Labour	Pippa White	298	12.8	+4.6
Majority		769	32.9	+11.5
Turnout		2,335		
Conservative hold		Swing		

Emmbrook
Party	Candidate	Votes	%	±%
Conservative	Philip Mirfin	1,863	56.1	+6.9
Liberal Democrats	Jeremy Harley	741	22.3	−10.3
Labour	Paul Sharples	444	13.4	+4.7
UKIP	Stella Howell	272	8.2	−1.4
Majority		1,122	33.8	+17.2
Turnout		3,320		
Conservative hold		Swing		

Evendons
Party	Candidate	Votes	%	±%
Conservative	Christopher Bowring	1,778	56.1	+4.6
Liberal Democrats	Carolyn Dooley	703	22.2	−11.9
Labour	Tony Skuse	413	13.0	+5.0
UKIP	Mike Spencer	278	8.8	+2.3
Majority		1,075	33.9	+16.5
Turnout		3,172		
Conservative hold		Swing		

Hawkedon
Party	Candidate	Votes	%	±%
Conservative	Tim Holton	1,486	55.6	+7.0
Liberal Democrats	Anthony Vick	731	27.3	−18.0
Labour	Neville Waites	458	17.1	+17.1
Majority		755	28.2	+24.9
Turnout		2,675		
Conservative hold		Swing		

Hillside
Party	Candidate	Votes	%	±%
Conservative	Norman Jorgensen	1,853	58.0	+11.5
Liberal Democrats	Muir Ahmed	548	17.1	−23.1
Labour	David Sharp	501	15.7	+5.4
Green	Andrew Tunley	294	9.2	+9.2
Majority		1,305	40.8	+34.5
Turnout		3,196		
Conservative hold		Swing		

Loddon
Party	Candidate	Votes	%	±%
Conservative	Abdul Loyes	1,288	45.8	+4.0
Liberal Democrats	Tom McCann	975	34.6	−8.3
Labour	Roger Hayes	375	13.3	+1.5
Green	Andrew Sansom	176	6.3	+2.8
Majority		313	11.2	
Turnout		2,814		
Conservative hold		Swing		

Maiden Erlegh
Party	Candidate	Votes	%	±%
Conservative	David Chopping	1,626	50.4	
Liberal Democrats	David Hare	725	22.5	
Labour	Jacqueline Rupert	579	18.0	
Green	Nicholas Marshall	295	9.1	
Majority		901	27.9	
Turnout		3,225		
Conservative hold		Swing		

Norreys
Party	Candidate	Votes	%	±%
Conservative	Alistair Auty	1,630	53.4	+2.7
Liberal Democrats	John Bray	455	14.9	−14.9
Labour	Mary Gascoyne	452	14.8	+2.6
Independent	Robin Smith	283	9.3	+9.3
UKIP	Keith Knight	230	7.5	+0.1
Majority		1,175	38.5	+17.6
Turnout		3,050		
Conservative hold		Swing		

Shinfield North
Party	Candidate	Votes	%	±%
Conservative	Parry Batth	421	50.2	−5.9
Labour	Christopher Bertrand	212	25.3	+9.7
Liberal Democrats	Steven Scarrott	100	11.9	−5.4
Green	Ann Bowen-Jones	57	6.8	+6.8
UKIP	Joan Huntley	48	5.7	−5.3
Majority		209	24.9	−13.9
Turnout		838		
Conservative hold		Swing		

Shinfield South
Party	Candidate	Votes	%	±%
Conservative	Anthony Pollock	1,296	62.0	
Green	Marjory Bisset	507	24.3	
Liberal Democrats	Imogen Shepherd-Dubey	287	13.7	
Majority		789	37.7	
Turnout		2,090		
Conservative hold		Swing		

Sonning
Party	Candidate	Votes	%	±%
Conservative	Mike Haines	977	72.5	−3.9
Labour	Philippa Hills	168	12.5	+7.2
Green	John Prior	136	10.1	+10.1
UKIP	Geoff Bulpitt	67	5.0	+1.1
Majority		809	60.0	−2.0
Turnout		1,348		
Conservative hold		Swing		

South Lake
Party	Candidate	Votes	%	±%
Liberal Democrats	Kay Gilder	828	44.3	−2.8
Conservative	Chris Smith	606	32.4	−2.3
Labour	Ian Hills	315	16.9	+3.5
Green	Julia Titus	119	6.4	+6.4
Majority		222	11.9	−0.5
Turnout		1,868		
Liberal Democrats hold		Swing		

Twyford
Party	Candidate	Votes	%	±%
Liberal Democrats	Dee Tomlin	1,281	51.7	−16.6
Conservative	Sam Hawkins	875	35.3	+8.8
Labour	Roy Mantel	203	8.2	+5.1
UKIP	Andrew Heape	118	4.8	+2.7
Majority		406	16.4	−25.4
Turnout		2,477		
Liberal Democrats hold		Swing		

Wescott
Party	Candidate	Votes	%	±%
Conservative	Julian McGhee-Sumner	1,125	54.3	−5.9
Liberal Democrats	David Vaughan	426	20.6	+0.9
Labour	John Woodward	268	12.9	+6.3
Green	Martyn Foss	135	6.5	+6.5
UKIP	Marcus Ellis	118	5.7	−4.9
Majority		699	33.7	−5.8
Turnout		2,072		
Conservative hold		Swing		

Winnersh
Party	Candidate	Votes	%	±%
Conservative	Philip Houldsworth	1,284	42.3	+3.2
Liberal Democrats	Rachelle Shepherd-Dubey	1,212	40.0	−9.3
Labour	John Baker	287	9.5	+2.4
UKIP	Tony Pollock	176	5.8	+1.3
Green	Omar Hamid	73	2.4	+2.4
Majority		72	2.3	
Turnout		3,032		
Conservative gain from Liberal Democrats		Swing		

Wokingham Without
Party	Candidate	Votes	%	±%
Conservative	David Sleight	2,049	68.6	+8.3
Liberal Democrats	Roland Cundy	360	12.1	−8.8
Labour	Tim Jinkerson	333	11.2	+1.0
UKIP	Graham Widdows	243	8.1	−0.6
Majority		1,689	56.6	+17.2
Turnout		2,985		
Conservative hold		Swing		
