= 2010 Wokingham Borough Council election =

2010 UK local government election

Map of the results of the 2010 Wokingham council election. Conservatives in blue and Liberal Democrats in yellow. Wards in grey were not contested in 2010.

The 2010 Wokingham Borough Council election took place on 6 May 2010 to elect members of Wokingham Unitary Council in Berkshire, England. One third of the council was up for election and the Conservative Party stayed in overall control of the council.

After the election, the composition of the council was:

- Conservative 43
- Liberal Democrat 11

== Election result ==
The results saw the Conservatives stay in control of the council with 43 seats, but lose 1 seat to the Liberal Democrats who then had 11 councillors. Liberal Democrat Sue Smith gained Loddon from Conservative Abdul Loyes by 51 votes in the only change in the political composition of the council. This was the first time since the 2001 election that the Conservatives had failed to gain seats at an election for Wokingham council. Overall turnout in the election was 71.33%, significantly up after the council election was held at the same time as the general election.

Wokingham local election result 2010
Party	Seats	Gains	Losses	Net gain/loss	Seats %	Votes %	Votes	+/−
Conservative	16	0	1	-1	80.0	50.9	39,166	-6.8%
Liberal Democrats	4	1	0	+1	20.0	35.3	27,191	+4.8%
Labour	0	0	0	0	0	8.2	6,345	+3.4%
UKIP	0	0	0	0	0	3.7	2,852	-2.4%
Green	0	0	0	0	0	1.7	1,305	+1.0%
Monster Raving Loony	0	0	0	0	0	0.2	143	+0.2%

== Ward results ==
Arborfield
Party	Candidate	Votes	%	±%
Conservative	Gary Cowan	859	58.6	−14.1
Liberal Democrats	Stephen Bacon	515	35.1	+12.0
UKIP	Joan Huntley	92	6.3	+2.1
Majority		344	23.5	−26.1
Turnout		1,466		
Conservative hold		Swing		

Bulmershe and Whitegates
Party	Candidate	Votes	%	±%
Liberal Democrats	Sam Rahmouni	1,742	38.1	−7.0
Conservative	Shahid Younis	1,615	35.3	−1.2
Labour	Greg Bello	877	19.2	+5.9
UKIP	Peter Jackson	214	4.7	−0.4
Green	Adrian Windisch	127	2.8	+2.8
Majority		127	2.8	−5.8
Turnout		4,575		
Liberal Democrats hold		Swing		

Coronation
Party	Candidate	Votes	%	±%
Conservative	Keith Baker	1,788	52.8	−0.4
Liberal Democrats	Patrick Power	1,064	31.4	−6.3
Labour	Pippa White	278	8.2	+3.9
UKIP	Amy Thornton	156	4.6	−0.2
Green	John Prior	99	2.9	+2.9
Majority		724	21.4	+5.9
Turnout		3,385		
Conservative hold		Swing		

Emmbrook
Party	Candidate	Votes	%	±%
Conservative	Chris Singleton	2,376	49.2	−6.6
Liberal Democrats	Jeremy Harley	1,574	32.6	+3.7
UKIP	Ann Davis	462	9.6	−1.0
Labour	Paul Sharples	418	8.7	+4.0
Majority		802	16.6	−10.3
Turnout		4,830		
Conservative hold		Swing		

Evendons
Party	Candidate	Votes	%	±%
Conservative	Alistair Corrie	2,537	51.5	−11.6
Liberal Democrats	Carolyn Dooley	1,679	34.1	+11.5
Labour	Tony Skuse	393	8.0	+2.5
UKIP	Mike Spencer	321	6.5	−3.3
Majority		858	17.4	−23.1
Turnout		4,930		
Conservative hold		Swing		

Finchampstead North
Party	Candidate	Votes	%	±%
Conservative	Rob Stanton	2,209	68.2	−8.0
Liberal Democrats	Jim May	1,030	31.8	+14.4
Majority		1,179	36.4	−22.4
Turnout		3,239		
Conservative hold		Swing		

Finchampstead South
Party	Candidate	Votes	%	±%
Conservative	Simon Weeks	2,084	65.6	−1.4
Liberal Democrats	Roland Cundy	840	26.4	+1.5
Labour	Clive Williams	252	7.9	+7.9
Majority		1,244	39.2	−2.9
Turnout		3,176		
Conservative hold		Swing		

Hawkedon
Party	Candidate	Votes	%	±%
Conservative	Michael Firmager	2,203	48.6	−18.4
Liberal Democrats	Anthony Vick	2,052	45.3	+17.0
UKIP	David Lamb	277	6.1	+1.4
Majority		151	3.3	−35.4
Turnout		4,532		
Conservative hold		Swing		

Hillside
Party	Candidate	Votes	%	±%
Conservative	Andrew Bradley	2,277	46.5	−6.0
Liberal Democrats	David Hare	1,967	40.2	+2.6
Labour	David Sharp	505	10.3	+4.0
Monster Raving Loony	Top Cat Owen	143	2.9	+2.9
Majority		310	6.3	−8.6
Turnout		4,892		
Conservative hold		Swing		

Loddon
Party	Candidate	Votes	%	±%
Liberal Democrats	Sue Smith	1,997	42.9	−11.4
Conservative	Abdul Loyes	1,945	41.8	+4.7
Labour	Roger Hayes	548	11.8	+6.9
Green	Andrew Sansom	164	3.5	+3.5
Majority		52	1.1	−16.1
Turnout		4,654		
Liberal Democrats gain from Conservative		Swing		

Maiden Erlegh (2)
Party	Candidate	Votes	%	±%
Conservative	Paul Swaddle	2,254		
Conservative	Kenneth Miall	2,161		
Liberal Democrats	John Eastwell	2,083		
Liberal Democrats	Caroline Smith	2,016		
Labour	Jacqueline Rupert	1,077		
Turnout		9,591		
Conservative hold		Swing		
Conservative hold		Swing		

Norreys
Party	Candidate	Votes	%	±%
Conservative	David Lee	2,347	50.7	−8.7
Liberal Democrats	David Vaughan	1,379	29.8	+10.5
Labour	Mary Gascoyne	566	12.2	+2.1
UKIP	Keith Knight	341	7.4	−3.7
Majority		968	20.9	−19.2
Turnout		4,633		
Conservative hold		Swing		

Remenham, Wargrave and Ruscombe
Party	Candidate	Votes	%	±%
Conservative	Bob Pitts	2,107	65.3	−9.2
Liberal Democrats	Martin Alder	909	28.2	+6.8
Labour	Richard Fort	211	6.5	+2.4
Majority		1,198	37.1	−16.0
Turnout		3,227		
Conservative hold		Swing		

Shinfield South (2)
Party	Candidate	Votes	%	±%
Conservative	Barrie Patman	1,949		
Conservative	Charlotte Haitham Taylor	1,820		
Liberal Democrats	Elaine Spratling	1,188		
Green	Marjory Bisset	664		
Green	David Hogg	251		
Turnout		5,872		
Conservative hold		Swing		
Conservative hold		Swing		

South Lake
Party	Candidate	Votes	%	±%
Liberal Democrats	Beth Rowland	1,481	47.1	−5.1
Conservative	Jenny Cheng	1,091	34.7	+0.9
Labour	Ian Hills	423	13.4	+7.0
UKIP	Martin Martinez	152	4.8	−2.8
Majority		390	12.4	−6.0
Turnout		3,147		
Liberal Democrats hold		Swing		

Swallowfield
Party	Candidate	Votes	%	±%
Conservative	Stuart Munro	970	60.9	−15.3
Liberal Democrats	Steven Scarrott	388	24.4	+7.2
UKIP	Max Bowker	234	14.7	+8.1
Majority		582	36.6	−22.4
Turnout		1,592		
Conservative hold		Swing		

Winnersh
Party	Candidate	Votes	%	±%
Liberal Democrats	Prue Bray	2,348	49.3	+7.8
Conservative	John Kaiser	1,866	39.1	−9.3
Labour	John Baker	339	7.1	+2.5
UKIP	Tony Pollock	214	4.5	−1.1
Majority		482	10.2	
Turnout		4,767		
Liberal Democrats hold		Swing		

Wokingham Without
Party	Candidate	Votes	%	±%
Conservative	Angus Ross	2,708	60.3	−15.9
Liberal Democrats	Linda Higgs	939	20.9	+7.5
Labour	Rosemary Chapman	458	10.2	+10.2
UKIP	Graham Widdows	389	8.7	−1.7
Majority		1,769	39.4	−23.4
Turnout		4,494		
Conservative hold		Swing		
