= 2008 Wokingham Borough Council election =

2008 UK local government election

Map of the results of the 2008 Wokingham council election. Conservatives in blue and Liberal Democrats in yellow. Wards in grey were not contested in 2008.

The 2008 Wokingham Borough Council election took place on 1 May 2008 to elect members of Wokingham Unitary Council in Berkshire, England. One third of the council was up for election and the Conservative Party stayed in overall control of the council.

After the election, the composition of the council was:

- Conservative 44
- Liberal Democrat 10

== Campaign ==
18 seats were contested in the election with candidates from the Conservatives, Liberal Democrats, Labour, UK Independence Party, Green Party and British National Party standing. The leader of the council, Conservative councillor Frank Browne, was one of a number of councillors who stood down at the election. The Conservatives were defending 14 seats compared to 4 for the Liberal Democrats.

The Conservatives defended their record in running the council and committed themselves to keeping a weekly bin collection, fight to keep down the number of new houses being built in the council area and continue investing in services. Meanwhile, the Liberal Democrats criticised cuts in adult social care services and school maintenance funds and attacked a lack of democracy over proposed developments. Other issues raised in the election included crime and Council Tax increases.

== Election result ==
The election saw only one seat change hands with the Conservatives gaining Hillside from the Liberal Democrats to remain in control of the council with 44 of the 54 seats. Hillside ward had seen the former Liberal Democrat councillor, Alan Spratling, step down at the election and he was succeeded by Conservative Pauline Jorgensen, wife of another councillor for Hillside, Norman Jorgensen. The election also saw the United Kingdom Independence Party overtake Labour in the number of votes won across the council to win the third most votes. Overall turnout in the election was 38.23%.

Following the election David Lee was elected as the new leader of the council to replace Frank Browne after he had stood down at the election.

Wokingham local election result 2008
| Party | Seats | Gains | Losses | Net gain/loss | Seats % | Votes % | Votes | +/− |
|---|---|---|---|---|---|---|---|---|
| Conservative | 15 | 1 | 0 | +1 | 83.3 | 57.7 | 21,241 | +6.2% |
| Liberal Democrats | 3 | 0 | 1 | -1 | 16.7 | 30.5 | 11,218 | -1.8% |
| UKIP | 0 | 0 | 0 | 0 | 0 | 6.1 | 2,239 | -0.4% |
| Labour | 0 | 0 | 0 | 0 | 0 | 4.8 | 1,781 | -1.9% |
| Green | 0 | 0 | 0 | 0 | 0 | 0.7 | 272 | -0.1% |
| BNP | 0 | 0 | 0 | 0 | 0 | 0.1 | 44 | +0.1% |

== Ward results ==
Bulmershe & Whitegates
| Party | Candidate | Votes | % | ±% |
|---|---|---|---|---|
| Liberal Democrats | Jennifer Lissaman | 1,168 | 45.1 | −5.8 |
| Conservative | Mohammed Younis | 944 | 36.5 | +6.9 |
| Labour | Gregory Bello | 345 | 13.3 | −0.9 |
| UKIP | Peter Jackson | 131 | 5.1 | −0.2 |
| Majority | | 224 | 8.6 | −12.7 |
| Turnout | | 2,588 | 40.8 | +2.8 |
| Liberal Democrats hold | | Swing | | |

Charvil
| Party | Candidate | Votes | % | ±% |
|---|---|---|---|---|
| Conservative | Emma Hobbs | 746 | 65.8 | +14.8 |
| Liberal Democrats | Arthur Illenden | 317 | 28.0 | −14.0 |
| Labour | Brian Scott | 51 | 4.5 | +1.5 |
| UKIP | Joan Huntley | 20 | 1.8 | −2.3 |
| Majority | | 429 | 37.8 | +28.8 |
| Turnout | | 1,134 | 50.3 | −3.1 |
| Conservative hold | | Swing | | |

Emmbrook
| Party | Candidate | Votes | % | ±% |
|---|---|---|---|---|
| Conservative | Ullakarin Clark | 1,521 | 55.8 | +6.6 |
| Liberal Democrats | Keith Malvern | 788 | 28.9 | −4.7 |
| UKIP | Ann Davis | 289 | 10.6 | −1.3 |
| Labour | Paul Sharples | 128 | 4.7 | −0.5 |
| Majority | | 733 | 26.9 | +11.3 |
| Turnout | | 2,726 | 44.0 | +0.5 |
| Conservative hold | | Swing | | |

Evendons
| Party | Candidate | Votes | % | ±% |
|---|---|---|---|---|
| Conservative | Dianne King | 1,456 | 63.1 | +5.3 |
| Liberal Democrats | Jeremy Harley | 521 | 22.6 | −1.8 |
| UKIP | Michael Spencer | 203 | 8.8 | −2.6 |
| Labour | Anthony Skuse | 128 | 5.5 | −0.9 |
| Majority | | 935 | 40.5 | +7.1 |
| Turnout | | 2,308 | 35.2 | −1.2 |
| Conservative hold | | Swing | | |

Finchampstead North
| Party | Candidate | Votes | % | ±% |
|---|---|---|---|---|
| Conservative | Michael Gore | 1,420 | 76.2 | +5.1 |
| Liberal Democrats | James May | 325 | 17.4 | −2.5 |
| UKIP | Ian Gordon | 118 | 6.3 | +0.3 |
| Majority | | 1,095 | 58.8 | +7.6 |
| Turnout | | 1,863 | 44.2 | −2.6 |
| Conservative hold | | Swing | | |

Finchampstead South
| Party | Candidate | Votes | % | ±% |
|---|---|---|---|---|
| Conservative | Gerald Cockcroft | 1,177 | 67.0 | −1.9 |
| Liberal Democrats | Roland Cundy | 438 | 24.9 | +5.1 |
| UKIP | Geoffrey Bulpitt | 142 | 8.1 | +1.7 |
| Majority | | 739 | 42.1 | −7.0 |
| Turnout | | 1,757 | 39.9 | −2.1 |
| Conservative hold | | Swing | | |

Hawkedon
| Party | Candidate | Votes | % | ±% |
|---|---|---|---|---|
| Conservative | Matthew Deegan | 1,275 | 67.0 | +7.1 |
| Liberal Democrats | John Eastwell | 538 | 28.3 | +3.4 |
| UKIP | David Lamb | 90 | 4.7 | +2.0 |
| Majority | | 737 | 38.7 | +3.7 |
| Turnout | | 1,903 | 27.5 | −2.7 |
| Conservative hold | | Swing | | |

Hillside
| Party | Candidate | Votes | % | ±% |
|---|---|---|---|---|
| Conservative | Pauline Jorgensen | 1,449 | 52.5 | +2.0 |
| Liberal Democrats | David Hare | 1,038 | 37.6 | −2.7 |
| Labour | David Sharp | 174 | 6.3 | +0.9 |
| UKIP | Geraint Jones | 99 | 3.6 | −0.2 |
| Majority | | 411 | 14.9 | +4.7 |
| Turnout | | 2,760 | 42.2 | −0.6 |
| Conservative gain from Liberal Democrats | | Swing | | |

Hurst
| Party | Candidate | Votes | % | ±% |
|---|---|---|---|---|
| Conservative | Annette Drake | 699 | 75.4 | +3.8 |
| Liberal Democrats | Haydon Trott | 136 | 14.7 | −6.5 |
| Labour | Daniel Clifton | 53 | 5.7 | −1.5 |
| UKIP | Amy Thornton | 39 | 4.2 | +4.2 |
| Majority | | 563 | 60.7 | +10.3 |
| Turnout | | 927 | 43.6 | +0.2 |
| Conservative hold | | Swing | | |

Loddon
| Party | Candidate | Votes | % | ±% |
|---|---|---|---|---|
| Liberal Democrats | Phillip Challis | 1,234 | 54.3 | +12.1 |
| Conservative | Parvinder Batth | 842 | 37.1 | −8.4 |
| Labour | Alberto Troccoli | 112 | 4.9 | −2.5 |
| UKIP | Bernard Wakeford | 84 | 3.7 | −1.2 |
| Majority | | 392 | 17.2 | |
| Turnout | | 2,272 | 34.9 | +1.7 |
| Liberal Democrats hold | | Swing | | |

Maiden Erlegh
| Party | Candidate | Votes | % | ±% |
|---|---|---|---|---|
| Conservative | Christopher Edmunds | 1,508 | 58.7 | +2.5 |
| Liberal Democrats | Caroline Smith | 584 | 22.7 | −3.5 |
| Labour | Jacqueline Rupert | 206 | 8.0 | +0.6 |
| Green | David Hogg | 136 | 5.3 | −0.4 |
| UKIP | Peter Williams | 134 | 5.2 | +0.8 |
| Majority | | 924 | 36.0 | +6.0 |
| Turnout | | 2,568 | 35.2 | −0.6 |
| Conservative hold | | Swing | | |

Norreys
| Party | Candidate | Votes | % | ±% |
|---|---|---|---|---|
| Conservative | Lee Gordon-Walker | 1,369 | 59.4 | 0.0 |
| Liberal Democrats | Stephen Bacon | 446 | 19.3 | +0.5 |
| UKIP | Keith Knight | 257 | 11.1 | +3.6 |
| Labour | Jennifer Spratley | 234 | 10.1 | −0.2 |
| Majority | | 923 | 40.1 | −0.5 |
| Turnout | | 2,306 | 35.2 | −3.1 |
| Conservative hold | | Swing | | |

Remenham, Wargrave and Ruscombe
| Party | Candidate | Votes | % | ±% |
|---|---|---|---|---|
| Conservative | Claire Stretton | 1,330 | 74.5 | +1.0 |
| Liberal Democrats | Martin Alder | 382 | 21.4 | +2.6 |
| Labour | Stuart Crainer | 73 | 4.1 | +0.3 |
| Majority | | 948 | 53.1 | −1.6 |
| Turnout | | 1,785 | 42.3 | −4.7 |
| Conservative hold | | Swing | | |

Shinfield South
| Party | Candidate | Votes | % | ±% |
|---|---|---|---|---|
| Conservative | Malcolm Bryant | 1,140 | 71.6 | +19.0 |
| Liberal Democrats | Richard Mitchell | 259 | 16.3 | +16.3 |
| Green | Marjory Bisset | 136 | 8.5 | +0.6 |
| UKIP | Andrew Findlay | 57 | 3.6 | +0.8 |
| Majority | | 881 | 55.3 | +39.5 |
| Turnout | | 1,592 | 32.7 | −10.0 |
| Conservative hold | | Swing | | |

Twyford
| Party | Candidate | Votes | % | ±% |
|---|---|---|---|---|
| Liberal Democrats | Stephen Conway | 1,441 | 68.3 | +7.6 |
| Conservative | John Jarvis | 560 | 26.5 | +2.7 |
| Labour | Roy Mantel | 65 | 3.1 | −9.2 |
| UKIP | Gerald Sleep | 45 | 2.1 | −1.1 |
| Majority | | 881 | 41.8 | +4.9 |
| Turnout | | 2,111 | 46.9 | −0.2 |
| Liberal Democrats hold | | Swing | | |

Wescott
| Party | Candidate | Votes | % | ±% |
|---|---|---|---|---|
| Conservative | Robert Wyatt | 929 | 60.2 | +0.2 |
| Liberal Democrats | David Vaughan | 304 | 19.7 | −3.8 |
| UKIP | Franklin Carstairs | 164 | 10.6 | −0.2 |
| Labour | John Woodward | 102 | 6.6 | +0.9 |
| BNP | Mark Burke | 44 | 2.9 | +2.9 |
| Majority | | 625 | 40.5 | +4.0 |
| Turnout | | 1,543 | 37.9 | −0.9 |
| Conservative hold | | Swing | | |

Winnersh
| Party | Candidate | Votes | % | ±% |
|---|---|---|---|---|
| Conservative | Elizabeth Siggery | 1,162 | 48.4 | +5.5 |
| Liberal Democrats | John Peffers | 997 | 41.5 | −6.2 |
| UKIP | Vincent Pearson | 134 | 5.6 | −0.1 |
| Labour | John Baker | 110 | 4.6 | +1.0 |
| Majority | | 165 | 6.9 | |
| Turnout | | 2,403 | 36.1 | −2.8 |
| Conservative hold | | Swing | | |

Wokingham Without
| Party | Candidate | Votes | % | ±% |
|---|---|---|---|---|
| Conservative | Pauline Helliar-Symons | 1,714 | 76.2 | +4.6 |
| Liberal Democrats | Robert May | 302 | 13.4 | −3.5 |
| UKIP | Graham Widdows | 233 | 10.4 | −1.1 |
| Majority | | 1,412 | 62.8 | +8.1 |
| Turnout | | 2,249 | 37.4 | −0.7 |
| Conservative hold | | Swing | | |
