= 2007 Wokingham District Council election =

2007 UK local government election

Map of the results of the 2007 Wokingham council election. Conservatives in blue and Liberal Democrats in yellow. Wards in grey were not contested in 2007.

The 2007 Wokingham District Council election took place on 3 May 2007 to elect members of Wokingham Unitary Council in Berkshire, England. One third of the council was up for election and the Conservative Party stayed in overall control of the council.

After the election, the composition of the council was:

- Conservative 43
- Liberal Democrat 11

== Election result ==
The results saw the Conservatives gain 2 seats from the Liberal Democrats to increase their majority on the council. They now had 43 seats on the council after victories in Hillside and Loddon wards, with the Conservative candidate in Loddon, Kirsten Miller, being one of the youngest candidates in Wokingham at the age of 23. Overall turnout in the election was 38.8%.

Wokingham local election result 2007
Party	Seats	Gains	Losses	Net gain/loss	Seats %	Votes %	Votes	+/−
Conservative	14	2	0	+2	77.8	51.5	18,614	-4.8%
Liberal Democrats	4	0	2	-2	22.2	32.3	11,654	+3.3%
Labour	0	0	0	0	0	6.7	2,413	-0.2%
UKIP	0	0	0	0	0	6.5	2,348	0.0%
Independent	0	0	0	0	0	2.0	706	+2.0%
Green	0	0	0	0	0	0.8	300	0.0%
Putting Local People First	0	0	0	0	0	0.3	98	+0.3%

== Ward results ==
Barkham
Party	Candidate	Votes	%	±%
Conservative	Pamela Stubbs	694	76.4	+3.1
Liberal Democrats	Allan Wrobel	170	18.7	+3.7
UKIP	Leslie Huntley	44	4.8	−6.9
Majority		524	57.7	−0.6
Turnout		908	37.8	+3.7
Conservative hold		Swing		

Bulmershe & Whitegates
Party	Candidate	Votes	%	±%
Liberal Democrats	George Storry	1,207	50.9	+7.1
Conservative	Alison Swaddle	703	29.6	−2.3
Labour	Gregory Bello	337	14.2	−0.6
UKIP	Peter Jackson	125	5.3	−4.2
Majority		504	21.3	+9.4
Turnout		2,372	38.0	−0.7
Liberal Democrats hold		Swing		

Coronation
Party	Candidate	Votes	%	±%
Conservative	Patricia Sherratt	1,133	53.2	−3.7
Liberal Democrats	Coling Lawley	802	37.7	+1.7
UKIP	Amy Thornton	103	4.8	+1.6
Labour	Jasdip Garcha	92	4.3	+0.4
Majority		331	15.5	−5.4
Turnout		2,130	47.3	−5.5
Conservative hold		Swing		

Emmbrook
Party	Candidate	Votes	%	±%
Conservative	John Mirfin	1,307	49.2	−5.4
Liberal Democrats	Keith Malvern	892	33.6	+5.1
UKIP	Ann Davis	317	11.9	+1.5
Labour	John Woodward	138	5.2	−1.2
Majority		415	15.6	−10.5
Turnout		2,654	43.5	−1.1
Conservative hold		Swing		

Evendons
Party	Candidate	Votes	%	±%
Conservative	Christopher Bowring	1,361	57.8	−0.4
Liberal Democrats	Jeremy Harley	576	24.4	−2.8
UKIP	Ian Gordon	269	11.4	+3.0
Labour	Paul Sharples	150	6.4	+0.3
Majority		785	33.4	+2.4
Turnout		2,356	36.4	−0.6
Conservative hold		Swing		

Hawkedon
Party	Candidate	Votes	%	±%
Conservative	Timothy Holton	1,210	59.9	0.0
Liberal Democrats	John Eastwell	504	24.9	−1.4
Labour	Jacqueline Pluves	253	12.5	+3.4
UKIP	Andrew Findlay	54	2.7	−2.0
Majority		706	35.0	+1.4
Turnout		2,021	30.2	−0.7
Conservative hold		Swing		

Hillside
Party	Candidate	Votes	%	±%
Conservative	Norman Jorgensen	1,427	50.5	+3.7
Liberal Democrats	David Hare	1,138	40.3	+0.5
Labour	David Sharp	152	5.4	−1.2
UKIP	Jeremy Allison	106	3.8	+1.3
Majority		289	10.2	+3.2
Turnout		2,823	42.8	+0.2
Conservative gain from Liberal Democrats		Swing		

Loddon
Party	Candidate	Votes	%	±%
Conservative	Kirsten Miller	960	45.5	−0.1
Liberal Democrats	Phillip Challis	891	42.2	+6.5
Labour	Alberto Troccoli	156	7.4	−4.3
UKIP	Vincent Pearson	104	4.9	−2.1
Majority		69	3.3	−6.6
Turnout		2,111	33.2	−0.4
Conservative gain from Liberal Democrats		Swing		

Maiden Erlegh
Party	Candidate	Votes	%	±%
Conservative	David Chopping	1,461	56.2	+4.0
Liberal Democrats	Caroline Smith	682	26.2	−3.4
Labour	Jacqueline Rupert	192	7.4	+0.4
Green	David Hogg	149	5.7	−0.9
UKIP	David Lamb	115	4.4	−0.1
Majority		779	30.0	+7.4
Turnout		2,599	35.8	+1.1
Conservative hold		Swing		

Norreys
Party	Candidate	Votes	%	±%
Conservative	Alistair Auty	1,455	59.4	−4.3
Liberal Democrats	Stephen Bacon	461	18.8	+1.7
Labour	Mark Squires	252	10.3	+0.3
UKIP	Keith Knight	185	7.5	−1.7
Putting Local People First	Mark Burke	98	4.0	+4.0
Majority		994	40.6	−6.0
Turnout		2,451	38.3	+0.4
Conservative hold		Swing		

Shinfield North
Party	Candidate	Votes	%	±%
Conservative	Norman Gould	327	56.1	−2.1
Liberal Democrats	Graham Philp	101	17.3	+1.0
Labour	Keith Wilson	91	15.6	−9.9
UKIP	Peter Williams	64	11.0	+11.0
Majority		226	38.8	+6.1
Turnout		583	33.0	−3.1
Conservative hold		Swing		

Shinfield South
Party	Candidate	Votes	%	±%
Conservative	Anthony Pollock	1,009	52.6	−13.3
Independent	Andrew Grimes	706	36.8	+36.8
Green	Marjory Bisset	151	7.9	−0.7
UKIP	Joan Huntley	54	2.8	−1.2
Majority		303	15.8	−36.3
Turnout		1,920	42.7	+7.0
Conservative hold		Swing		

Sonning
Party	Candidate	Votes	%	±%
Conservative	John Chapman	875	76.4	+19.6
Liberal Democrats	Paula Dove	165	14.4	−15.3
Labour	Pippa White	61	5.3	−1.1
UKIP	Peter Armand	45	3.9	−3.2
Majority		710	62.0	+34.9
Turnout		1,146	48.2	−0.9
Conservative hold		Swing		

South Lake
Party	Candidate	Votes	%	±%
Liberal Democrats	Kay Gilder	864	52.2	+6.3
Conservative	Parvindar Batth	560	33.8	−4.9
UKIP	Geoffrey Bulpit	125	7.6	+0.8
Labour	Roger Hayes	106	6.4	−2.1
Majority		304	18.4	+11.2
Turnout		1,655	36.5	+0.7
Liberal Democrats hold		Swing		

Twyford
Party	Candidate	Votes	%	±%
Liberal Democrats	Deirdre Tomlin	1,263	60.7	
Conservative	John Jarvis	496	23.8	
Labour	Roy Mantel	255	12.3	
UKIP	Gerald Sleep	66	3.2	
Majority		767	36.9	
Turnout		2,080	47.1	−0.3
Liberal Democrats hold		Swing		

Wescott
Party	Candidate	Votes	%	±%
Conservative	Julian McGhee-Sumner	933	60.0	
Liberal Democrats	Gregory Newman	366	23.5	
UKIP	Franklin Carstairs	168	10.8	
Labour	John Baker	88	5.7	
Majority		567	36.5	
Turnout		1,555	38.8	−2.5
Conservative hold		Swing		

Winnersh
Party	Candidate	Votes	%	±%
Liberal Democrats	Malcolm Armstrong	1,185	47.7	−0.2
Conservative	John Green	1,066	42.9	−0.3
UKIP	Anthony Pollock	141	5.7	+1.3
Labour	Anthony Skuse	90	3.6	+1.1
Majority		119	4.8	+0.1
Turnout		2,482	38.9	−3.7
Liberal Democrats hold		Swing		

Wokingham Without
Party	Candidate	Votes	%	±%
Conservative	Perry Lewis	1,637	71.6	+5.7
Liberal Democrats	Philip Bristow	387	16.9	+5.0
UKIP	Graham Widdows	263	11.5	−0.3
Majority		1,250	54.7	+0.7
Turnout		2,287	38.1	−2.2
Conservative hold		Swing		
