= 2015 Wokingham Borough Council election =

2015 UK local government election

Map of the results

The 2015 Wokingham Borough Council election took place on 7 May 2015 to elect members of Wokingham Borough Council in England. This was on the same day as other local elections and the 2015 United Kingdom general election.

== Election result ==
The Conservatives retained control of the council and gained two seats from the Liberal Democrats, winning all seats that were up for election.

Wokingham local election result 2015
Party	Seats	Gains	Losses	Net gain/loss	Seats %	Votes %	Votes	+/−
Conservative	47	2	0	2	87%	49.6	34,694	+4.6%
Liberal Democrats	5	0	2	-2	9%	21.1	14,810	+1.2%
Labour	1	0	0	0	2%	13.5	9,445	+2.2%
UKIP	0	0	0	0	0%	9.6	6,765	-8.0%
Green	0	0	0	0	0%	5.9	4,153	+0.6%
TUSC	0	0	0	0	0%	0.03	25	+0.03%
Independent	1	0	0	0	2%	0.0	0	0%

== Ward results ==
Barkham
Party	Candidate	Votes	%	±%
Conservative	John Kaiser	1,245	65.8	0.3
Liberal Democrats	Fiona Rolls	274	14.4	−20.1
Labour	Timothy Jinkerson	217	11.5	11.5
Green	Martin Foss	148	7.8	7.8
Majority		971	51.3	20.4
Turnout		1892	71%	
Conservative hold		Swing	0.5	

8 Ballot papers were rejected

Bulmershe and Whitegates
Party	Candidate	Votes	%	±%
Conservative	Mohammed Younis	1,777	37.8	10.9
Labour	Tony Skuse	1,354	28.8	−5.4
Liberal Democrats	Munir Ahmed	679	14.4	−3.2
UKIP	Peter Jackson	579	12.3	−2.6
Green	Adrian Windisch	273	5.8	−0.3
Majority		423	8.9	1.6
Turnout		4701	70%	
Conservative hold		Swing		

39 ballot papers were rejected

Coronation
Party	Candidate	Votes	%	±%
Conservative	Kate Haines	1,906	56.6	−2.1
Liberal Democrats	Paddy Power	507	15.0	2.1
Labour	Ian Hills	407	12.0	2.9
UKIP	Tony Bartlett	336	9.9	−3.0
Green	Emma Louise Hamilton	190	5.6	−1.0
Majority		1399	41.5	−2.1
Turnout		3364	75%	
Conservative hold		Swing		

18 ballot papers were rejected

Emmbrook
Party	Candidate	Votes	%	±%
Conservative	Philip Mirfin	2,186	43.5	6.0
Liberal Democrats	Imogen Shepherd-DuBey	1,731	34.4	−2.7
UKIP	Tony Hannington	452	9.0	−6.4
Labour	Mary Gascoyne	419	8.3	−1.6
Green	Matthew Valler	233	4.6	4.6
Majority		455	9.0	8.7
Turnout		5022	75%	
Conservative hold		Swing		

31 ballot papers were rejected

Evendons
Party	Candidate	Votes	%	±%
Conservative	Christopher Bowring	2,558	49.9	3.2
Liberal Democrats	Keith Malvern	1,044	20.3	−2.4
Labour	Anna Rogerson	553	10.7	−0.2
UKIP	Victoria Patey	515	10.0	−6.6
Green	Patrick King	399	7.7	7.7
Majority		1514	29.5	5.6
Turnout		5122	72%	
Conservative hold		Swing		

23 ballot papers were rejected

Hawkedon
Party	Candidate	Votes	%	±%
Conservative	Tim Holton	2,143	45.3	7.5
Liberal Democrats	Clive Jones	1,464	30.9	−4.3
Labour	Neville Waites	555	11.7	−0.5
UKIP	Alistair Campbell	361	7.6	−7.0
Green	John Prior	182	3.8	3.8
Majority		679	14.3	11.8
Turnout		4726	68%	
Conservative hold		Swing		

21 ballot papers were rejected

Hillside
Party	Candidate	Votes	%	±%
Conservative	Norman Jorgensen	2,366	50.3	4.6
Liberal Democrats	Steven Scarrott	1,065	22.6	−0.4
Labour	Alice Rogers	324	6.8	−8.2
Green	Christopher Riley	265	5.6	5.6
UKIP	David Blackwell	681	14.4	−1.3
Majority		1301	27.6	−13.4
Turnout		4701	72%	
Conservative hold		Swing		

23 ballot papers were rejected

Loddon
Party	Candidate	Votes	%	±%
Conservative	Abdul Loyes	2,346	48.6	7.2
Liberal Democrats	Nigel Harman	835	17.3	0.1
Labour	Tom Clark	812	16.8	2.4
UKIP	Chrissie Winter	543	11.2	−9.0
Green	Julia Titus	240	4.9	−1.6
Majority		1511	31.3	10.2
Turnout		4825	69%	
Conservative hold		Swing		

31 ballot papers were rejected

Maiden Erlegh
Party	Candidate	Votes	%	±%
Conservative	David Chopping	2,461	47.3	7.6
Labour	Jacqueline Rupert	946	18.2	2.4
Liberal Democrats	David Hare	931	17.9	−1.1
UKIP	Lesley Danilow	464	8.9	−6.2
Green	Russell Seymour	367	7.0	−3.1
Majority		1515	29.1	−5.1
Turnout		5196	71%	
Conservative hold		Swing		

27 ballot papers were rejected

Norreys
Party	Candidate	Votes	%	±%
Conservative	Alistair Auty	2,503	51.2	9.7
Liberal Democrats	James Gilmour	821	16.7	−1.9
UKIP	Karl Bastiman	611	12.5	−9.3
Labour	Michael McShane	576	11.7	0.8
Green	Anthea West	308	6.3	−0.6
TUSC	Sara Gillman	21	0.4	0.4
Majority		1682	34.4	−2.2
Turnout		4887	69%	
Conservative hold		Swing		

42 ballot papers were rejected

Shinfield North
Party	Candidate	Votes	%	±%
Conservative	Parry Batth	609	40.3	−9.9
Labour	Andy Croy	501	33.1	7.8
UKIP	Christopher Moore	212	14.0	8.3
Liberal Democrats	Tahir Maher	108	7.1	−4.8
Green	David Hogg	70	4.6	−2.2
TUSC	John Gillman	4	0.2	0.2
Majority		108	7.1	−17.8
Turnout		1510	60%	
Conservative hold		Swing		

6 ballot papers were rejected

Shinfield South
Party	Candidate	Votes	%	±%
Conservative	Anthony Pollock	2,223	57.1	4.9
UKIP	Alastair Hunter	521	13.3	−9.5
Labour	Alfredo Reino	480	12.3	12.3
Liberal Democrats	Elaine Spratling	395	10.1	−1.0
Green	Thomas Blomley	269	6.9	−6.4
Majority		1702	43.7	11.0
Turnout		3889	69%	
Conservative hold		Swing		

11 ballot papers were rejected

Sonning
Party	Candidate	Votes	%	±%
Conservative	Mike Haines	1,249	65.5	−7.0
Labour	Philippa Hills	254	13.3	0.8
Green	Brian O'Callaghan	205	10.7	0.6
UKIP	Tim Smith	190	9.9	4.9
Majority		995	52.2	−7.8
Turnout		1904	73%	
Conservative hold		Swing		

6 ballot papers were rejected

South Lake
Party	Candidate	Votes	%	±%
Conservative	Laura Blumenthal	1,203	40.5	11.3
Liberal Democrats	Kay Gilder	898	30.2	−3.6
Labour	Kieran Pearson	448	15.1	1.1
UKIP	Amelia Gonzalez-Gil	293	9.8	−7.6
Green	Alison Pope	111	3.7	−1.6
Majority		305	10.2	5.6
Turnout		2965	74%	
Conservative gain from Liberal Democrats		Swing		

12 ballot papers were rejected

Twyford
Party	Candidate	Votes	%	±%
Conservative	John Jarvis	1420	40.9	12.1
Liberal Democrats	Dee Tomlin	1349	38.8	−16.4
Labour	Charles Wickendon	283	8.1	−0.5
UKIP	Andrew Heape	254	7.3	7.3
Green	Kezia Black	155	4.4	−2.0
Majority		71	2.0	−24.4
Turnout		3469	71%	
Conservative gain from Liberal Democrats		Swing		

7 ballot papers were rejected

Wescott
Party	Candidate	Votes	%	±%
Conservative	Julian Sumner	1,592	50.6	−0.4
Liberal Democrats	Femi Obileye	557	17.7	5.9
Labour	Paul Sharples	358	11.3	−1.1
Green	David Chapman	334	10.6	−3.4
UKIP	Ellison Withe	285	9.0	−1.1
Majority		1035	32.9	1.9
Turnout		3145	72%	
Conservative hold		Swing		

19 ballot papers were rejected

Winnersh
Party	Candidate	Votes	%	±%
Conservative	Philip Houldsworth	2,075	42.4	16.8
Liberal Democrats	Shaun Hanna	1,613	32.9	−20.2
UKIP	Phil Ray	562	11.4	−4.1
Labour	Jeremy Curtis	476	9.7	3.1
Green	Stephen Lloyd	197	4.0	4.0
Majority		462	9.0	18.5
Turnout		4888	67%	
Conservative hold		Swing		

11 ballot papers were rejected

Wokingham Without
Party	Candidate	Votes	%	±%
Conservative	David Sleight	2,832	60.6	−5.4
UKIP	Jason Murdoch	587	12.5	−3.9
Liberal Democrats	Jim May	539	11.5	3.9
Labour	Marilyn Groves	482	10.3	10.3
Green	Jonathan Schofield	207	4.4	−4.8
Majority		2245	48.0	17.0
Turnout		4670	74%	
Conservative hold		Swing		

17 ballot papers were rejected
