= 2006 Wokingham District Council election =

2006 UK local government election

Map of the results of the 2006 Wokingham council election. Conservatives in blue and Liberal Democrats in yellow. Wards in grey were not contested in 2006.

The 2006 Wokingham District Council election took place on 4 May 2006 to elect members of Wokingham Unitary Council in Berkshire, England. One third of the council was up for election and the Conservative Party stayed in overall control of the council.

After the election, the composition of the council was:

- Conservative 41
- Liberal Democrat 13

== Campaign ==
The election saw the United Kingdom Independence Party put forward a candidate in all of the 18 wards which were being contested. This was the first time they had done this and meant they put forward more candidates than Labour who contested 16 of the wards.

During the campaign the Liberal Democrat leader on the council, Coling Lawley, received death threats, which led the police to launch an investigation.

== Election result ==
The results saw the Conservatives strengthen their control of the council after gaining three seats from the Liberal Democrats. The gains came in Coronation, Loddon and Hillside wards with one of the defeated Liberal Democrats being their leader Coling Lawley who lost by 472 votes in Coronation ward. Overall turnout in the election was 39.8%.

Wokingham local election result 2006
Party	Seats	Gains	Losses	Net gain/loss	Seats %	Votes %	Votes	+/−
Conservative	15	3	0	+3	83.3	56.3	20,353	+3.1
Liberal Democrats	3	0	3	-3	16.7	29.0	10,497	-6.3
Labour	0	0	0	0	0.0	6.9	2,512	+1.5
UKIP	0	0	0	0	0.0	6.5	2,333	+0.8
Green	0	0	0	0	0.0	0.8	291	+0.4
Monster Raving Loony	0	0	0	0	0.0	0.5	171	+0.5

== Ward results ==
Arborfield
Party	Candidate	Votes	%	±%
Conservative	Gary Cowan	541	72.7	−5.6
Liberal Democrats	Stephen Bacon	172	23.1	+10.1
UKIP	Ronald Bristow	31	4.2	−4.5
Majority		369	49.6	−15.7
Turnout		744	41.1	+1.5
Conservative hold		Swing		

Bulmershe & Whitegates
Party	Candidate	Votes	%	±%
Liberal Democrats	Sellam Rahmouni	999	43.8	
Conservative	Tanya De Hoedt	727	31.9	
Labour	Gregory Bello	338	14.8	
UKIP	Peter Williams	216	9.5	
Majority		272	11.9	
Turnout		2,280	38.7	+0.6
Liberal Democrats hold		Swing		

Coronation
Party	Candidate	Votes	%	±%
Conservative	Keith Baker	1,285	56.9	
Liberal Democrats	Coling Lawley	813	36.0	
Labour	Jasdip Garcha	88	3.9	
UKIP	Amy Thornton	72	3.2	
Majority		472	20.9	
Turnout		2,258	52.8	+6.7
Conservative gain from Liberal Democrats		Swing		

Emmbrook
Party	Candidate	Votes	%	±%
Conservative	Deborah Lewis	1,448	54.6	
Liberal Democrats	Keith Malvern	757	28.5	
UKIP	Ann Davis	277	10.4	
Labour	Anna Rogerson	171	6.4	
Majority		691	26.1	
Turnout		2,653	44.6	−0.3
Conservative hold		Swing		

Evendons
Party	Candidate	Votes	%	±%
Conservative	Denis Morgan	1,367	58.2	
Liberal Democrats	Jeremy Harley	639	27.2	
UKIP	Franklin Carstairs	197	8.4	
Labour	Franco Valente	144	6.1	
Majority		728	31.0	
Turnout		2,347	37.0	−3.7
Conservative hold		Swing		

Finchampstead North
Party	Candidate	Votes	%	±%
Conservative	Robert Stanton	1,363	71.1	
Liberal Democrats	Roland Cundy	382	19.9	
UKIP	Ian Gordon	116	6.0	
Labour	Pippa White	57	3.0	
Majority		981	51.2	
Turnout		1,918	46.8	−0.1
Conservative hold		Swing		

Finchampstead South
Party	Candidate	Votes	%	±%
Conservative	Simon Weeks	1,221	68.9	
Liberal Democrats	James May	351	19.8	
UKIP	Leslie Huntley	113	6.4	
Labour	Roger Hayes	86	4.9	
Majority		870	49.1	
Turnout		1,771	42.0	+1.8
Conservative hold		Swing		

Hawkedon
Party	Candidate	Votes	%	±%
Conservative	Michael Firmager	1,152	59.9	
Liberal Democrats	Jennifer Orchard	505	26.3	
Labour	Jacqueline Pluves	175	9.1	
UKIP	Vincent Pearson	91	4.7	
Majority		607	33.6	
Turnout		1,923	30.9	−1.3
Conservative hold		Swing		

Hillside
Party	Candidate	Votes	%	±%
Conservative	Andrew Bradley	1,303	46.8	
Liberal Democrats	Tania Christidis	1,109	39.8	
Labour	David Sharp	183	6.6	
Monster Raving Loony	Peter Owen	120	4.3	
UKIP	Andrew Findlay	70	2.5	
Majority		194	7.0	
Turnout		2,785	42.6	+3.2
Conservative gain from Liberal Democrats		Swing		

Loddon
Party	Candidate	Votes	%	±%
Conservative	Abdul Loyes	941	45.6	
Liberal Democrats	Carol Jewell	736	35.7	
Labour	Alberto Troccoli	241	11.7	
UKIP	William Brooks	144	7.0	
Majority		205	9.9	
Turnout		2,062	33.6	+4.9
Conservative gain from Liberal Democrats		Swing		

Maiden Erlegh
Party	Candidate	Votes	%	±%
Conservative	Paul Swaddle	1,295	52.2	
Liberal Democrats	Caroline Smith	735	29.6	
Labour	Jacqueline Rupert	173	7.0	
Green	David Hogg	164	6.6	
UKIP	David Lamb	112	4.5	
Majority		560	22.6	
Turnout		2,479	34.7	−4.6
Conservative hold		Swing		

Norreys
Party	Candidate	Votes	%	±%
Conservative	David Lee	1,452	63.7	
Liberal Democrats	Michael Harper	390	17.1	
Labour	John Woodward	228	10.0	
UKIP	Keith Knight	209	9.2	
Majority		1,062	46.6	
Turnout		2,279	37.9	−1.1
Conservative hold		Swing		

Remenham, Wargrave & Ruscombe
Party	Candidate	Votes	%	±%
Conservative	Christopher Schutz	1,398	73.5	
Liberal Democrats	Martin Alder	357	18.8	
UKIP	Geoffrey Bulpit	75	3.9	
Labour	Richard Fort	72	3.8	
Majority		1,041	54.7	
Turnout		1,902	47.0	−3.2
Conservative hold		Swing		

Shinfield South
Party	Candidate	Votes	%	±%
Conservative	Barrie Patman	969	65.9	
Liberal Democrats	Fiona Rolls	203	13.8	
Green	Marjory Bisset	127	8.6	
Labour	Julianne Grafton	112	7.6	
UKIP	Joan Huntley	59	4.0	
Majority		766	52.1	
Turnout		1,470	35.7	−2.0
Conservative hold		Swing		

South Lake
Party	Candidate	Votes	%	±%
Liberal Democrats	Elizabeth Rowland	724	45.9	
Conservative	Parvindar Batth	611	38.7	
Labour	Paul Sharples	134	8.5	
UKIP	David Hill	108	6.8	
Majority		113	7.2	
Turnout		1,577	35.8	+3.8
Liberal Democrats hold		Swing		

Swallowfield
Party	Candidate	Votes	%	±%
Conservative	Stuart Munro	637	76.2	+7.8
Liberal Democrats	Denis Thair	144	17.2	−3.3
UKIP	Jeremy Allison	55	6.6	−4.5
Majority		493	59.0	+11.1
Turnout		836	43.2	+2.5
Conservative hold		Swing		

Winnersh
Party	Candidate	Votes	%	±%
Liberal Democrats	Prue Bray	1,199	47.9	
Conservative	Derek Sefton	1,083	43.2	
UKIP	Anthony Pollock	109	4.4	
Labour	Keith Wilson	63	2.5	
Monster Raving Loony	Colin Forrestal	51	2.0	
Majority		116	4.7	
Turnout		2,505	42.6	+1.0
Liberal Democrats hold		Swing		

Wokingham Without
Party	Candidate	Votes	%	±%
Conservative	Angus Ross	1,560	65.9	
Liberal Democrats	Philip Bristow	282	11.9	
UKIP	Graham Widdows	279	11.8	
Labour	Rosemary Chapman	247	10.4	
Majority		1,278	54.0	
Turnout		2,368	40.3	−0.7
Conservative hold		Swing		
