= 1999 Wokingham District Council election =

1999 UK local government election

The 1999 Wokingham District Council election took place on 6 May 1999 to elect members of Wokingham Unitary Council in Berkshire, England. One third of the council was up for election and the Conservative party stayed in overall control of the council. Overall turnout was 29%.

After the election, the composition of the council was

- Conservative 30
- Liberal Democrat 24

== Election result ==
Wokingham local election result 1999
Party	Seats	Gains	Losses	Net gain/loss	Seats %	Votes %	Votes	+/−
Conservative	10	0	1	-1	55.6	43.0	12,204	
Liberal Democrats	8	1	0	+1	44.4	42.6	12,066	
Labour	0	0	0	0	0	14.1	3,991	
Independent	0	0	0	0	0	0.3	95	

== Ward results ==
Arborfield
Party	Candidate	Votes	%	±%
Conservative	Gary Cowan	438	65.5	
Liberal Democrats	Stephen Bacon	231	34.5	
Majority		207	31.0	
Turnout		669	47	
Conservative hold		Swing		

Bulmershe
Party	Candidate	Votes	%	±%
Liberal Democrats	Colin Preston	511	47.4	
Labour	Adrian Hutton	352	32.6	
Conservative	Kathleen Henderson	216	20.0	
Majority		159	14.8	
Turnout		1,079	35	
Liberal Democrats hold		Swing		

Coronation
Party	Candidate	Votes	%	±%
Liberal Democrats	Thomas McCann	832	45.9	
Conservative	George Parkinson	768	42.4	
Labour	Philippa Hills	213	11.7	
Majority		64	3.5	
Turnout		1,813	31	
Liberal Democrats hold		Swing		

Emmbrook
Party	Candidate	Votes	%	±%
Conservative	Raymond Eke	842	51.7	
Liberal Democrats	Richard Medlycott	532	32.7	
Labour	John Ferguson	254	15.6	
Majority		310	19.0	
Turnout		1,628	35	
Conservative hold		Swing		

Evendons
Party	Candidate	Votes	%	±%
Conservative	Denis Morgan	980	44.0	
Liberal Democrats	Tina Marinos	873	39.2	
Labour	John Woodward	278	12.5	
Independent	Colin King	95	4.3	
Majority		107	4.8	
Turnout		2,226	26	
Conservative hold		Swing		

Finchampstead North
Party	Candidate	Votes	%	±%
Liberal Democrats	Roland Cundy	853	52.8	
Conservative	Edward Stott	762	47.2	
Majority		91	5.6	
Turnout		1,615	35.5	
Liberal Democrats gain from Conservative		Swing		

Finchampstead South
Party	Candidate	Votes	%	±%
Conservative	Gerald Cockroft	658	59.5	
Liberal Democrats	Philip Bristow	447	40.5	
Majority		211	19.0	
Turnout		1,105	23	
Conservative hold		Swing		

Little Hungerford
Party	Candidate	Votes	%	±%
Liberal Democrats	Caroline Smith	1,286	54.6	
Conservative	Christopher Edmunds	811	34.4	
Labour	Jacqueline Rupert	260	11.0	
Majority		475	20.2	
Turnout		2,357	29	
Liberal Democrats hold		Swing		

Loddon
Party	Candidate	Votes	%	±%
Liberal Democrats	Denis Thair	797	62.0	
Conservative	Philip Gribble	251	19.5	
Labour	David Gerken	237	18.4	
Majority		546	42.5	
Turnout		1,285	20	
Liberal Democrats hold		Swing		

Norreys
Party	Candidate	Votes	%	±%
Conservative	Marian Robertson	1,061	56.3	
Labour	Franco Valente	512	27.2	
Liberal Democrats	Carolyn Hare	311	16.5	
Majority		549	29.1	
Turnout		1,884	30.5	
Conservative hold		Swing		

Redhatch
Party	Candidate	Votes	%	±%
Liberal Democrats	Alan Spratling	1,712	62.3	
Conservative	Emma MacDonald	721	26.2	
Labour	Nimmi Harlow	315	11.5	
Majority		991	36.1	
Turnout		2,748	22	
Liberal Democrats hold		Swing		

Remenham & Wargrave
Party	Candidate	Votes	%	±%
Conservative	Simon Etheridge	769	65.7	
Liberal Democrats	Martin Alder	270	23.1	
Labour	Henry Palmer	132	11.3	
Majority		499	42.6	
Turnout		1,171	33	
Conservative hold		Swing		

Shinfield
Party	Candidate	Votes	%	±%
Conservative	Anthony Pollock	796	56.6	
Liberal Democrats	Marian Targett	347	24.7	
Labour	Owen Waite	264	18.8	
Majority		449	31.9	
Turnout		1,407	24	
Conservative hold		Swing		

South Lake
Party	Candidate	Votes	%	±%
Liberal Democrats	Beth Rowland	708	63.2	
Conservative	Sue Doughty	233	20.8	
Labour	Nelson Bland	180	16.1	
Majority		475	42.4	
Turnout		1,121	25	
Liberal Democrats hold		Swing		

Swallowfield
Party	Candidate	Votes	%	±%
Conservative	Clare Beatty	449	77.4	
Labour	David Sharp	70	12.1	
Liberal Democrats	Veronica Hull	61	10.5	
Majority		379	65.3	
Turnout		580	39	
Conservative hold		Swing		

Twyford & Ruscombe
Party	Candidate	Votes	%	±%
Liberal Democrats	Dee Tomlin	1,393	58.9	
Conservative	Pamela Graddon	750	31.7	
Labour	Roy Mantel	223	9.4	
Majority		643	27.2	
Turnout		2,366	41	
Liberal Democrats hold		Swing		

Winnersh
Party	Candidate	Votes	%	±%
Conservative	Robert Turner	730	46.3	
Liberal Democrats	Prue Bray	713	45.2	
Labour	Mary Gascoyne	134	8.5	
Majority		17	1.1	
Turnout		1,577	27	
Conservative hold		Swing		

Wokingham Without
Party	Candidate	Votes	%	±%
Conservative	Angus Ross	969	56.2	
Labour	Carole Saunders	567	32.9	
Liberal Democrats	Thomas McCann	189	11.0	
Majority		402	23.3	
Turnout		1,725	33	
Conservative hold		Swing		
