= 2016 Wokingham Borough Council election =

2016 UK local government election

Map of the results

The 2016 Wokingham Borough Council election took place on 5 May 2016 to elect members of Wokingham Borough Council in England. This was on the same day as other local elections.

== Election result ==
The Conservatives retained control of the council and gained one seat from an Independent Candidate.

Wokingham local election result 2016
Party	Seats	Gains	Losses	Net gain/loss	Seats %	Votes %	Votes	+/−
Conservative	47	2	0	2	87%	49.6	34,694	+4.6%
Liberal Democrats	5	0	2	-2	9%	21.1	14,810	+1.2%
Labour	1	0	0	0	2%	13.5	9,445	+2.2%
UKIP	0	0	0	0	0%	9.6	6,765	-8.0%
Green	0	0	0	0	0%	5.9	4,153	+0.6%
TUSC	0	0	0	0	0%	0.03	25	+0.03%
Independent	1	0	0	0	2%	0	0	0%

== Ward results ==
Bulmershe and Whitegates (2 elected)
Party	Candidate	Votes	%	±%
Labour	Andy Croy (E)	1111	21.1	
Conservative	Alison Swaddle (E)	982	18.6	
Labour	Tony Skuse	955	18.1	
Conservative	Chris Ashford	905	17.2	
Liberal Democrats	Nigel Harman	522	9.9	
Liberal Democrats	Munir Ahmed	518	9.8	
Green	Adrian Windisch	222	4.2	
TUSC	John Gillman	43	0.8	
Majority				
Turnout		5258	42%	−28%
Labour gain from Conservative		Swing		
Conservative gain from Labour		Swing		

21 ballot papers were rejected

Charvil Ward
Party	Candidate	Votes	%	±%
Conservative	Emma Hobbs	493	47.0	+3.8
Independent	Nick Ray	481	45.9	−0.9
Labour	Brian Scott	73	6.9	+6.9
Majority		12	1.1	−2.5
Turnout		1047	45.0	−1.8
Conservative gain from Independent		Swing		

4 ballot papers were rejected

Emmbrook
Party	Candidate	Votes	%	±%
Conservative	Ullakarin Clark	1,235	43.5	0
Liberal Democrats	Imogen Shepherd-DuBey	1,222	43.0	8.6
Labour	Brent Lees	260	9.2	0.9
Green	David Worley	119	4.2	−0.4
Majority		13	0.4	−8.6
Turnout		2836	43%	−32%
Conservative hold		Swing		

19 ballot papers were rejected

Evendons
Party	Candidate	Votes	%	±%
Conservative	Dianne King	951	42.7	−7.2
Liberal Democrats	Helen Belcher	839	37.7	17.4
Labour	Annette Medhurst	294	13.2	3.2
Independent	Kaz Lokuciewski	115	5.1	5.1
Majority		112	5.0	−24.6
Turnout		2222		
Conservative hold		Swing		

23 ballot papers were rejected

Finchampstead North
Party	Candidate	Votes	%	±%
Conservative	Charles Margetts	1,143	69.6	
Liberal Democrats	Martin Doyle	182	11.1	
Labour	Stephen Barraclough	182	11.1	
Green	Martyn Foss	135	8.2	
Majority		961	58.5	
Turnout		1642	38	
Conservative hold		Swing		

12 ballot papers were rejected

Finchampstead South
Party	Candidate	Votes	%	±%
Conservative	Ian Pittock	706	50.7	
Liberal Democrats	Jim May	294	21.1	
UKIP	Jason Murdoch	175	12.6	
Labour	Neil Carrott	132	9.5	
Green	Matthew Valler	86	6.2	
Majority		412	29.6	
Turnout		1393	31	
Conservative hold		Swing		

13 ballot papers were rejected

Hawkedon
Party	Candidate	Votes	%	±%
Liberal Democrats	Clive Jones	1,063	48.7	17.8
Conservative	Guy Grandison	832	38.1	−7.2
Labour	Neville Waites	287	13.2	1.5
Majority		231	10.6	−3.7
Turnout		2,182	32%	−36%
Liberal Democrats gain from Conservative		Swing		

13 ballot papers were rejected

Hillside
Party	Candidate	Votes	%	±%
Conservative	Pauline Jorgensen	1,224	51.9	
Liberal Democrats	Steven Scarrott	730	31.0	
Labour	Jacqueline Rupert	402	17.1	
Majority		494	20.9	
Turnout		2356	37%	
Conservative hold		Swing		

18 ballot papers were rejected

Hurst
Party	Candidate	Votes	%	±%
Conservative	Wayne Smith	611	76.2	
Liberal Democrats	Peter Tang	105	13.1	
Labour	Paul Trott	86	10.7	
Majority		506	63.1	
Turnout		802	36%	
Conservative hold		Swing		

8 ballot papers were rejected.

Loddon
Party	Candidate	Votes	%	±%
Conservative	Richard Dolinsky	1,071	52.8	
Liberal Democrats	Thomas McCann	589	29.0	
Labour	Linda Dobraszczyk	368	18.1	
Majority		482	23.8	
Turnout		2,028	29%	
Conservative hold		Swing		

12 ballot papers were rejected

Maiden Erlegh
Party	Candidate	Votes	%	±%
Conservative	Ken Miall	1,010	46.0	
Liberal Democrats	David Hare	602	27.4	
Labour	Carl Doran	582	18.2	2.4
Majority		408	26.6	
Turnout		2,194	32%	
Conservative hold		Swing		

16 ballot papers were rejected

Norreys
Party	Candidate	Votes	%	±%
Conservative	Malcolm Richards	991	44.1	−7.1
Liberal Democrats	James Gilmour	384	17.1	0.4
Labour	Yvonne Hignell	332	14.8	3.1
UKIP	Philip Cunnington	322	14.3	1.8
Green	Anthea West	114	5.1	−1.2
Independent	Bruce Robertson	105	4.7	4.7
Majority		607	27.0	7.4
Turnout		2,248	32%	
Conservative hold		Swing		

15 ballot papers were rejected

Remenham, Wargrave and Ruscombe
Party	Candidate	Votes	%	±%
Conservative	John Halsall	930	64.6	
Liberal Democrats	Martin Alder	226	15.7	
Labour	Stuart Crainer	168	11.7	
Green	Kezia Black	116	8.1	
Majority		704	48.9	
Turnout		1,440	34%	
Conservative hold		Swing		

13 ballot papers were rejected.

Shinfield South
Party	Candidate	Votes	%	±%
Conservative	Charlotte Haitham Taylor	952	62.6	
Labour	John Woodward	210	13.8	
Green	Thomas Blomley	183	12.0	
Liberal Democrats	Elaine Spratling	176	11.6	
Majority		742	48.8	
Turnout		1,521	27%	
Conservative hold		Swing		

14 ballot papers were rejected

Twyford
Party	Candidate	Votes	%	±%
Liberal Democrats	Lindsay Ferris	1,173	57.0	
Conservative	Merv Boniface	705	34.3	
Labour	Charles Wickendon	179	8.7	
Majority		468	22.7	
Turnout		2,057	46%	
Liberal Democrats gain from		Swing		

14 ballot papers were rejected

Wescott
Party	Candidate	Votes	%	±%
Conservative	Oliver Whittle	808	53.7	
Liberal Democrats	Tahir Mahir	283	18.8	
Labour	Nadine Masseron	224	14.9	
Green	David Chapman	189	12.6	
Majority		525	34.9	
Turnout		1,504	33%	
Conservative hold		Swing		

10 ballot papers were rejected

Winnersh
Party	Candidate	Votes	%	±%
Liberal Democrats	Rachel Shepherd-Dubey	1,303	46.7	
Conservative	Liz Siggery	888	31.8	
Labour	Max Wellington	476	17.1	
Green	Stephen Lloyd	122	4.4	
Majority		415	14.9	
Turnout		2,789	35%	
Liberal Democrats hold		Swing		

11 ballot papers were rejected

Wokingham Without
Party	Candidate	Votes	%	±%
Conservative	Pauline Helliar-Symmons	1,301	64.6	
UKIP	Graham Widdows	297	14.7	
Labour	Ian Newman	253	12.6	10.3
Liberal Democrats	Alison Newton	163	8.1	3.9
Majority		1004	49.9	
Turnout		2,014	33%	
Conservative hold		Swing		

11 ballot papers were rejected
