= 2012 Wokingham Borough Council election =

2012 UK local government election

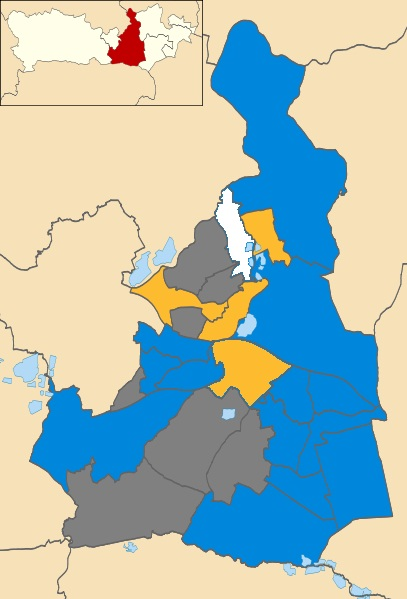
2012 Election Results for Wokingham Borough Conservatives in blue Liberal Democrats in yellow and Independent in White. Wards in grey were not contested in 2012.

The 2012 Wokingham Borough Council election took place on Thursday 3 May 2012, the same day as other 2012 United Kingdom local elections, to elect members of Wokingham Unitary Council in Berkshire, England. One third of the council was up for election and the Conservative Party stayed in overall control of the council.

After the election, the composition of the council was:

- Conservative 43
- Liberal Democrat 10
- Independent 1

== Background ==
A total of 74 candidates contested the 18 seats which were up for election. These included 18 Conservative, 18 Liberal Democrat, 14 Labour, 14 Green Party, 8 UK Independence Party and 3 independent candidates.

Issues in the election included:

- Recent changes to waste collections
- Some recent controversial planning applications

== Election result ==
The Conservatives retained control of the council despite losing 2 seats: 1 to the Liberal Democrats in Winnersh, and Charvil to an Independent. The Liberal Democrats held the 3 seats they defended in Bulmershe and Whitegates, Twyford and Loddon. However their gain in Winnersh was cancelled out a few hours later when Sue Smith resigned from the Liberal Democrats to finish her term as an Independent.

Wokingham local election result 2012
Party	Seats	Gains	Losses	Net gain/loss	Seats %	Votes %	Votes	+/−
Conservative	13	0	2	-2	72.2	48.4	15,345	-4.0%
Liberal Democrats	4	1	0	+1	22.2	24.1	7,643	-1.5%
Labour	0	0	0	0	0	12.2	3,862	-1.1%
Green	0	0	0	0	0	7.5	2,378	+3.2%
UKIP	0	0	0	0	0	5.4	1,733	+1.5%
Independent	1	1	0	+1	5.5	1.5	496	+0.9%

There were a total of 31,640 votes cast, including 183 spoiled ballots.

== Ward results ==
Bulmershe & Whitegates
Party	Candidate	Votes	%	±%
Liberal Democrats	Lesley Hayward	976	37.1	+3.9
Conservative	Mohammed Parvaiz	660	25.1	−11.4
Labour	Greg Bello	750	28.5	+7.6
UKIP	Billy Khan	137	5.2	−0.4
Green	Adrian Windisch	106	4.0	+0.2
Majority		226	8.6	+5.3
Turnout		2641	40	
Liberal Democrats hold		Swing	+3.9	

Charvil
Party	Candidate	Votes	%	±%
Liberal Democrats	Malcolm Storry	42	4.8	−23.2
Conservative	Emma Hobbs	382	43.2	−22.6
Green	James O'Callaghan	44	5.0	+5.0
Independent	Nick Ray	414	46.8	46.8
Majority		32	3.6	
Turnout		884	38	
Independent gain from Conservative		Swing	+46.8	

Emmbrook
Party	Candidate	Votes	%	±%
Conservative	Ullakarin Clark	1202	55.9	−0.2
Liberal Democrats	Suresh Jeganathan	291	13.5	−8.8
UKIP	Steven McMillan	330	15.3	+7.1
Labour	Paul Sharples	313	14.6	+1.2
Majority		872	42.4	
Turnout		2151	33	
Conservative hold		Swing	-0.2	

Evendons
Party	Candidate	Votes	%	±%
Conservative	Dianne King	967	50.2	−5.9
Liberal Democrats	Steven Scarrott	388	20.1	−2.1
UKIP	Mike Spencer	278	14.4	+6.2
Labour	Anthony Skuse	286	14.8	+1.8
Majority		579	30.1	
Turnout		1927	28	
Conservative hold		Swing	-5.9	

Finchampstead North
Party	Candidate	Votes	%	±%
Conservative	Mike Gore	1038	69.9	+1.7
Liberal Democrats	Roy Neall	121	8.2	−23.6
Labour	Tim Jinkerson	193	13.0	+13.0
Green	Martyn Foss	124	8.4	+8.4
Majority		845	61.7	
Turnout		1484	34	
Conservative hold		Swing	+1.7	

Finchampstead South
Party	Candidate	Votes	%	±%
Conservative	Ian Pittock	843	58.3	−9.9
Liberal Democrats	Roland Cundy	345	23.8	−2.4
Green	Matthew Valler	241	16.7	+16.7
Majority		498	34.5	
Turnout		1447	33	
Conservative hold		Swing	-7.3	

Hawkedon
Party	Candidate	Votes	%	±%
Conservative	Guy Grandison	688	42.8	−12.8
Liberal Democrats	Anthony Vick	402	25.0	−2.3
UKIP	Peter Jackson	142	8.8	+8.8
Labour	Neville Waites	278	17.3	+0.2
Green	John Prior	97	6.0	+6.0
Majority		286	17.8	
Turnout		1609	23	
Conservative hold		Swing	-12.8	

Hillside
Party	Candidate	Votes	%	±%
Conservative	Pauline Jorgensen	1062	50.5	−7.5
Liberal Democrats	Keith Yabsley	465	22.1	+4.6
Labour	David Sharp	317	15.1	−0.7
Green	Helene Cherry	241	11.4	+2.2
Majority		597	28.4	
Turnout		2105	31	
Conservative hold		Swing	-7.5	

Hurst
Party	Candidate	Votes	%	±%
Conservative	Wayne Smith	562	71.2	−4.2
Liberal Democrats	Paul Trott	83	10.5	−4.2
Labour	Umesh Ummat	62	7.8	+2.1
Green	Paula Montie	79	10	N/A
Majority		224	28.5	−32.2
Turnout		789	36	
Conservative hold		Swing	-4.2	

Loddon
Party	Candidate	Votes	%	±%
Liberal Democrats	Tom McCann	846	41.4	+6.8
Conservative	Bill Soane	751	36.7	−8.8
Labour	Tom Clark	303	14.8	+1.5
Green	Julia Titus	132	6.4	+0.1
Majority		95	4.7	
Turnout		2042	30	
Liberal Democrats hold		Swing	+6.8	

Maiden Erlegh
Party	Candidate	Votes	%	±%
Conservative	Ken Miall	966	45.5	−4.9
Liberal Democrats	David Hare	528	24.9	+2.4
Labour	Jacqueline Rupert	373	17.6	−0.4
Green	Nicholas Marshall	238	11.2	+2.1
Majority		438	20.6	
Turnout		2119	30	
Conservative hold		Swing	-4.9	

Norreys
Party	Candidate	Votes	%	±%
Conservative	Malcolm Llewellyn Richards	959	48.8	−4.6
Liberal Democrats	John Charles Bray	268	13.6	−1.3
UKIP	Keith John Knight	212	10.7	+3.2
Labour	Mary Gascoyne	315	16.0	+1.2
Green	Emma-Louise Hamilton	120	6.1	N/A
Independent	Robin Smith	82	4.1	−5.2
Majority		644	32.7	−5.8
Turnout		1965	29	
Conservative hold		Swing	-4.6	

Remenham, Wargrave and Ruscombe
Party	Candidate	Votes	%	±%
Conservative	John Anthony Sydney Halsall	937	68.5	−3.0
Liberal Democrats	Martin George Alder	248	18.1	−2.8
Labour	Matthew Stephen Dent	172	12.5	+5.3
Majority		689	50.4	
Turnout		1367	31	
Conservative hold		Swing	+0.2	

Shinfield South
Party	Candidate	Votes	%	±%
Conservative	Charlotte Jacqueline Louise Haitham-Taylor	893	58.6	−3.4
Liberal Democrats	Imogen Shepherd-DuBey	141	9.2	−4.5
Green	Marjory Diane Bisset	473	31.1	+6.8
Majority		420	26.8	−11.0
Turnout		1567	29	
Conservative hold		Swing	-3.4	

Twyford
Party	Candidate	Votes	%	±%
Liberal Democrats	Lindsay Ferris	1,011	55.2	+3.5
Conservative	Sam Hawkins	527	28.8	−6.5
Labour	Richard Fort	159	8.6	+0.4
Green	James Ewan	118	6.4	N/A
Majority		484	26.4	+10.0
Turnout		1829	40	
Liberal Democrats hold		Swing	+3.5	

Wescott
Party	Candidate	Votes	%	±%
Green	Kazek Lokuciewski	187	14.0	+7.5
Liberal Democrats	James Leask	158	11.8	−8.8
UKIP	Stella Howell	135	10.1	+4.4
Labour	John Woodward	166	12.4	−0.5
Conservative	Bob Wyatt	679	51.0	−4.3
Majority		492	36.9	+3.2
Turnout		1331	31	
Conservative hold		Swing	-3.3	

Winnersh
Party	Candidate	Votes	%	±%
Conservative	Mark Ashwell	961	38.2	−4.1
Liberal Democrats	Rachelle Shepherd-Dubey	1,183	47.0	+7.0
UKIP	Tony Pollock	183	7.2	−1.4
Labour	John Baker	175	6.9	−2.6
Majority		222	8.8	
Turnout		2513	35	
Liberal Democrats gain from Conservative		Swing	+7.0	

Wokingham Without
Party	Candidate	Votes	%	±%
Conservative	Pauline Helliar-Symons	1,268	66.0	−2.6
Liberal Democrats	Elaine Spratling	147	7.6	−4.5
Green	Thomas Blomley	178	9.2	+9.2
UKIP	Graham Widdows	316	16.4	+8.3
Majority		652	33.9	−22.7
Turnout		1920	31	
Conservative hold		Swing	-2.6	
