= 2000 Wokingham District Council election =

2000 UK local government election

The 2000 Wokingham District Council election took place on 4 May 2000 to elect members of Wokingham Unitary Council in Berkshire, England. One third of the council was up for election and the Conservative Party lost overall control of the council to no overall control.

After the election, the composition of the council was:

- Conservative 27
- Liberal Democrat 27

== Election result ==
Wokingham local election result 2000
| Party | Seats | Gains | Losses | Net gain/loss | Seats % | Votes % | Votes | +/− |
|---|---|---|---|---|---|---|---|---|
| Liberal Democrats | 11 | 3 | 0 | +3 | 57.9 | 41.7 | 11,991 | –0.9% |
| Conservative | 8 | 0 | 3 | –3 | 42.1 | 48.5 | 13,929 | +5.5% |
| Labour | 0 | 0 | 0 | 0 | 0 | 9.1 | 2,626 | –5.0% |
| Monster Raving Loony | 0 | 0 | 0 | 0 | 0 | 0.6 | 179 | +0.6% |

== Ward results ==
Barkham
| Party | Candidate | Votes | % | ±% |
|---|---|---|---|---|
| Conservative | Andrew Miller | 437 | 80.9 | |
| Liberal Democrats | Jeanette Targett | 60 | 11.1 | |
| Labour | Elizabeth Vincent | 43 | 7.9 | |
| Majority | | 377 | 69.8 | |
| Turnout | | 540 | 30.5 | |
| Conservative hold | | Swing | | |

Coronation
| Party | Candidate | Votes | % | ±% |
|---|---|---|---|---|
| Liberal Democrats | Michael Lennard | 953 | 47.6 | +1.7 |
| Conservative | George Parkinson | 910 | 45.5 | +3.1 |
| Labour | Eileen Bravey | 139 | 6.9 | −4.8 |
| Majority | | 43 | 2.1 | −1.4 |
| Turnout | | 2,002 | 34.6 | |
| Liberal Democrats hold | | Swing | | |

Emmbrook (2)
| Party | Candidate | Votes | % | ±% |
|---|---|---|---|---|
| Liberal Democrats | Jack Earnshaw | 950 | | |
| Liberal Democrats | Keith Malvern | 913 | | |
| Conservative | Dennis Carver | 745 | | |
| Conservative | David Lee | 686 | | |
| Labour | Paul French | 142 | | |
| Turnout | | 3,436 | 37.9 | |
| Liberal Democrats hold | | Swing | | |
| Liberal Democrats gain from Conservative | | Swing | | |

Evendons
| Party | Candidate | Votes | % | ±% |
|---|---|---|---|---|
| Liberal Democrats | Tina Marinos | 968 | 47.1 | +7.9 |
| Conservative | Dianne King | 958 | 46.6 | +2.6 |
| Labour | David Grattidge | 128 | 6.2 | −6.3 |
| Majority | | 10 | 0.5 | |
| Turnout | | 2,054 | 24.5 | |
| Liberal Democrats gain from Conservative | | Swing | | |

Finchampstead South
| Party | Candidate | Votes | % | ±% |
|---|---|---|---|---|
| Conservative | Muriel Long | 836 | 61.7 | +2.2 |
| Liberal Democrats | Dorothy Pollock | 518 | 38.3 | −2.2 |
| Majority | | 318 | 23.4 | +4.4 |
| Turnout | | 1,354 | 29.0 | |
| Conservative hold | | Swing | | |

Little Hungerford
| Party | Candidate | Votes | % | ±% |
|---|---|---|---|---|
| Liberal Democrats | Diana Carpenter | 1,050 | 47.4 | −7.2 |
| Conservative | Christopher Edmunds | 965 | 43.6 | +9.2 |
| Labour | Jacqueline Rupert | 198 | 8.9 | −2.1 |
| Majority | | 85 | 3.8 | −16.4 |
| Turnout | | 2,213 | 27.7 | |
| Liberal Democrats hold | | Swing | | |

Loddon
| Party | Candidate | Votes | % | ±% |
|---|---|---|---|---|
| Liberal Democrats | Christopher Clacey | 614 | 51.1 | −10.9 |
| Conservative | Kathleen Henderson | 440 | 36.6 | +17.1 |
| Labour | Irene Flen | 147 | 12.2 | −6.2 |
| Majority | | 174 | 14.5 | −28.0 |
| Turnout | | 1,201 | 18.9 | |
| Liberal Democrats hold | | Swing | | |

Norreys
| Party | Candidate | Votes | % | ±% |
|---|---|---|---|---|
| Conservative | Peter Edwards | 1,212 | 65.7 | +9.4 |
| Labour | Paul Sharples | 359 | 19.5 | −7.7 |
| Liberal Democrats | Andrew Rouse | 273 | 14.8 | −1.7 |
| Majority | | 853 | 46.2 | +17.1 |
| Turnout | | 1,844 | 29.9 | |
| Conservative hold | | Swing | | |

Redhatch
| Party | Candidate | Votes | % | ±% |
|---|---|---|---|---|
| Liberal Democrats | Fiona Rolls | 1,301 | 50.8 | −11.5 |
| Conservative | Norman Jorgensen | 866 | 33.8 | +7.6 |
| Labour | Susan Salts | 213 | 8.3 | −3.2 |
| Monster Raving Loony | Peter Owen | 179 | 7.0 | +7.0 |
| Majority | | 435 | 17.0 | −19.1 |
| Turnout | | 2,559 | 21.0 | |
| Liberal Democrats hold | | Swing | | |

Remenham & Wargrave
| Party | Candidate | Votes | % | ±% |
|---|---|---|---|---|
| Conservative | Frank Browne | 834 | 74.6 | +8.9 |
| Liberal Democrats | Martin Alder | 194 | 17.4 | −5.7 |
| Labour | Duncan Hurley | 90 | 8.1 | −3.2 |
| Majority | | 640 | 57.2 | +14.6 |
| Turnout | | 1,118 | 32.7 | |
| Conservative hold | | Swing | | |

Shinfield
| Party | Candidate | Votes | % | ±% |
|---|---|---|---|---|
| Conservative | Barrie Patman | 830 | 61.3 | +4.7 |
| Liberal Democrats | Gill Banks | 366 | 27.0 | +2.3 |
| Labour | Owen Waite | 159 | 11.7 | −7.1 |
| Majority | | 464 | 34.3 | +2.4 |
| Turnout | | 1,355 | 23.1 | |
| Conservative hold | | Swing | | |

Sonning
| Party | Candidate | Votes | % | ±% |
|---|---|---|---|---|
| Conservative | Nigel Rose | 440 | 84.3 | |
| Liberal Democrats | Haydon Trott | 47 | 9.0 | |
| Labour | Michael Irving | 35 | 6.7 | |
| Majority | | 393 | 75.3 | |
| Turnout | | 522 | 45.4 | |
| Conservative hold | | Swing | | |

South Lake
| Party | Candidate | Votes | % | ±% |
|---|---|---|---|---|
| Liberal Democrats | Kay Gilder | 515 | 56.5 | −6.7 |
| Conservative | Gerald Pett | 277 | 30.4 | +9.6 |
| Labour | David Kay | 119 | 13.1 | −3.0 |
| Majority | | 238 | 26.1 | −16.3 |
| Turnout | | 911 | 19.6 | |
| Liberal Democrats hold | | Swing | | |

Twyford & Ruscombe
| Party | Candidate | Votes | % | ±% |
|---|---|---|---|---|
| Liberal Democrats | Christine Ferris | 1,308 | 58.3 | −0.6 |
| Conservative | Pamela Graddon | 745 | 33.2 | +1.5 |
| Labour | Richard Fort | 190 | 8.5 | −0.9 |
| Majority | | 563 | 25.1 | −2.1 |
| Turnout | | 2,243 | 39.0 | |
| Liberal Democrats hold | | Swing | | |

Wescott
| Party | Candidate | Votes | % | ±% |
|---|---|---|---|---|
| Conservative | John Green | 639 | 55.7 | |
| Liberal Democrats | Peter Evans | 384 | 33.5 | |
| Labour | Anne Grattidge | 124 | 10.8 | |
| Majority | | 255 | 22.2 | |
| Turnout | | 1,147 | 29.8 | |
| Conservative hold | | Swing | | |

Whitegates
| Party | Candidate | Votes | % | ±% |
|---|---|---|---|---|
| Liberal Democrats | George Storry | 542 | 54.0 | |
| Labour | Nelson Bland | 244 | 24.3 | |
| Conservative | James O'Meara | 217 | 21.6 | |
| Majority | | 298 | 29.7 | |
| Turnout | | 1,003 | 34.6 | |
| Liberal Democrats hold | | Swing | | |

Winnersh
| Party | Candidate | Votes | % | ±% |
|---|---|---|---|---|
| Liberal Democrats | Prudence Bray | 858 | 47.9 | +2.7 |
| Conservative | John Wakefield | 852 | 47.6 | +1.3 |
| Labour | John Baker | 81 | 4.5 | −4.0 |
| Majority | | 6 | 0.3 | |
| Turnout | | 1,791 | 30.9 | |
| Liberal Democrats gain from Conservative | | Swing | | |

Wokingham Without
| Party | Candidate | Votes | % | ±% |
|---|---|---|---|---|
| Conservative | Perry Lewis | 1,040 | 72.6 | +16.4 |
| Labour | Rosemary Chapman | 215 | 15.0 | −17.9 |
| Liberal Democrats | Thomas McCann | 177 | 12.4 | +1.4 |
| Majority | | 825 | 57.6 | +34.3 |
| Turnout | | 1,432 | 26.8 | |
| Conservative hold | | Swing | | |
