= 2018 Wokingham Borough Council election =

Election of the council from Thursday 3 May 2018

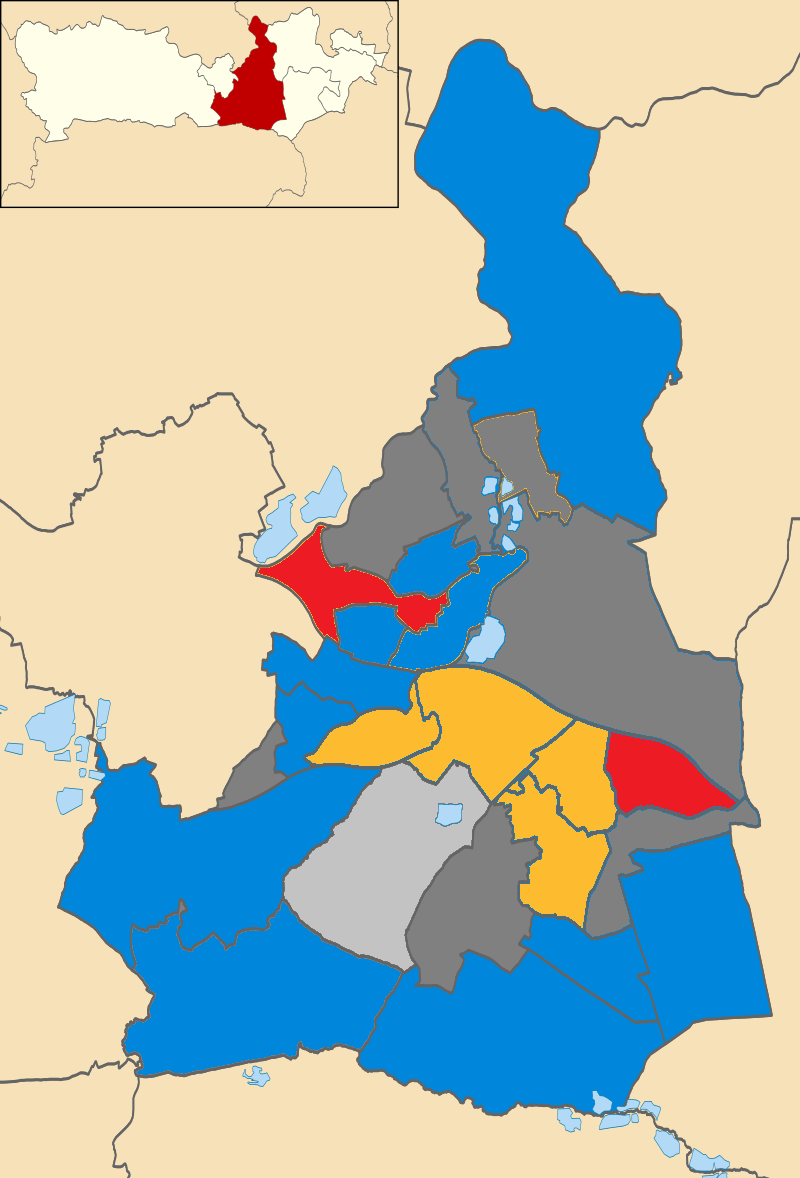
2018 Election Results for Wokingham Borough. Conservatives in blue, Liberal Democrats in yellow, Labour in Red and independent in light grey. Wards in dark grey were not contested in 2018.

The 2018 Wokingham Borough Council election took place on Thursday 3 May 2018. That was the same day as other United Kingdom local elections in order to elect members of Wokingham Unitary Council in Berkshire, England. One third of the council was up for election and the Conservative Party stayed comfortably in overall control of the council.

After the election, the composition of the council was:

- Conservative 42
- Liberal Democrat 8
- Labour 3
- Independent 1

== Background ==
A total of 60 candidates contested the 18 seats which were up for election.

Issues in the election included:

- Some recent controversial planning applications
- Wokingham Town Centre Regeneration

Since the last round of elections, there had been 1 by-election in Emmbrook in 2017, which was won by the Liberal Democrats. Also, 2 Councillors had left the Conservatives, with one joining the Liberal Democrats and one standing as an Independent.

== Election result ==
The Conservatives retained control of the council. The Liberal Democrats held two out of the three seats they defended, retaining their seats in Emmbrook and Winnersh, but lost a seat in South Lake to the Conservatives. The Liberal Democrats gained 2 seats in both Hawkedon and Evendons. Labour gained 2 seats in Bulmershe and Whitegates & Norreys. The Conservatives gained 1 seat in South Lake, but lost 4 seats in Evendons, Norreys, Bulmershe & Whitegates and Hawkedon. 1 seat was held by an Independent.

Wokingham local election result 2018
Party	Seats	Gains	Losses	Net gain/loss	Seats %	Votes %	Votes	+/−
Conservative	42	1	4	-3	77.7	45.1	18,325	-7.6
Liberal Democrats	8	2	1	1	14.8	31.7	12,888	+10.6
Labour	3	2	0	2	5.5	18.8	7,624	+5.3
Green	0	0	0	0	0.0	0.6	247	-5.3
Independent	1	0	0	0	1.8	3.3	1,347	+1.3

There were a total of 40,551 votes cast, including 120 spoiled ballots.

== Ward results ==
Arborfield
Party	Candidate	Votes	%	±%
Independent	Gary Cowan	540	65.6	+65.6
Conservative	David Edmonds	233	28.3	−30.6
Labour	Chris Everett	48	5.8	+5.8
Majority		307	37.3	+4.6
Turnout		822	41%	+4.7
Independent gain from Conservative		Swing	17.5	

Bulmershe & Whitegates
Party	Candidate	Votes	%	±%
Labour	Carl Doran	1,357	44.5	+5.3
Conservative	Majid Nagra	1167	38.2	+2.4
Liberal Democrats	Nigel Harman	371	12.1	−7.6
Green	Brian O'Callaghan	143	4.6	+0.4
Majority		190	6.2	
Turnout		3047	43%	+1
Labour gain from Conservative		Swing	3.8	

Coronation
Party	Candidate	Votes	%	±%
Conservative	Keith Baker	1,298	66.6	+10
Liberal Democrats	Paul Barton	328	16.8	+1.8
Labour	Ian Hills	315	16.1	+4.1
Majority		970	49.8	+8.3
Turnout		1947	44	−31
Conservative hold		Swing	7.0	

Emmbrook
Party	Candidate	Votes	%	±%
Liberal Democrats	Imogen Shepherd-DuBey	1,829	57.2	−2.5
Conservative	Jack Beresford	1084	33.9	+0.6
Labour	Peyman Jahromi	274	8.5	+5.5
Majority		745	23.3	−3.1
Turnout		3197	47	+7.3
Liberal Democrats hold		Swing	-0.5	

Evendons
Party	Candidate	Votes	%	±%
Liberal Democrats	Helen Power	1,375	46.5	11.2
Conservative	Mark Ashwell	1198	40.5	−2.2
Labour	Annette Medhurst	369	12.5	−0.7
Majority		177	5.9	+0.9
Turnout		2952	41	9
Liberal Democrats gain from Conservative		Swing	4.5	

Finchampstead North
Party	Candidate	Votes	%	±%
Conservative	Daniel Sargeant	1,086	57.1	−12.5
Liberal Democrats	David Cornish	611	32.1	+21.0
Green	Martyn Foss	104	5.4	−2.8
Labour	David Appleyard	97	5.1	−6.0
Majority		475	25.0	−20.2
Turnout		1899	44	6%
Conservative hold		Swing	4.2	

Finchampstead South
Party	Candidate	Votes	%	±%
Conservative	Simon Weeks	978	55.5	+4.8
Liberal Democrats	Susan Cornish	581	33.0	+12.1
Labour	Hayley Rentall	194	11.0	+1.5
Majority		397	22.5	−7.1
Turnout		1759	40	+9.0
Conservative hold		Swing	8.4	

Hawkedon
Party	Candidate	Votes	%	±%
Liberal Democrats	David Hare	1,096	44.8	−3.9
Conservative	Michael Firmager	975	39.8	+1.7
Labour	Brent Lees	369	15.0	+1.8
Majority		121	4.9	−5.7
Turnout		2445	35	3%
Liberal Democrats gain from Conservative		Swing	-1.1	

Hillside
Party	Candidate	Votes	%	±%
Conservative	Christopher Smith	1,233	44.0	−7.9
Liberal Democrats	Sue Smith	1166	41.6	10.6
Labour	Timothy Lloyd	394	14.0	3.1
Majority		67	2.3	−18.7
Turnout		2798	43.0	6.0%
Conservative hold		Swing	1.3	

Loddon
Party	Candidate	Votes	%	±%
Conservative	Bill Soane	1,358	57.7	+4.9
Labour	Rick Lay	525	22.1	+2.0
Liberal Democrats	Tom McCann	477	20.1	−8.9
Majority		833	35.1	6.1
Turnout		2372	33	4%
Conservative hold		Swing	2.2	

Maiden Erlegh
Party	Candidate	Votes	%	±%
Conservative	Guy Grandison	1,141	40.9	−5.1
Liberal Democrats	Tahir Maher	885	31.7	+4.3
Labour	Nadine Masseron	750	26.8	+8.2
Majority		256	9.1	−17.4
Turnout		2789	40	8%
Conservative hold		Swing	-2.5	

Norreys
Party	Candidate	Votes	%	±%
Labour	Rachel Burgess	1,157	38.1	+23.3
Conservative	David Lee	1084	35.7	−8.4
Liberal Democrats	Morgan Rise	405	13.3	−3.8
Independent	Philip Cunnington	384	12.6	+7.9
Majority		73	2.4	+24.6
Turnout		3035	40	8%
Labour gain from Conservative		Swing	7.4	

Remenham, Wargrave and Ruscombe
Party	Candidate	Votes	%	±%
Conservative	Graham Howe	1,150	67.5	+2.9
Liberal Democrats	Yonni Wilson	370	21.7	+6.0
Labour	Stuart Crainer	175	10.2	−1.5
Majority		780	45.8	−3.1
Turnout		1703	31%	3
Conservative hold		Swing	4.45	

Shinfield South
Party	Candidate	Votes	%	±%
Conservative	Barrie Patman	810	40.2	−22.4
Independent	Jim Freewin	423	21.0	+21.0
Labour	Marcus McDowell	416	20.6	+6.2
Liberal Democrats	Chris Johnson	359	17.8	+6.2
Majority		387	19.2	−29.6
Turnout		2011	31	+4
Conservative hold		Swing	-0.7	

South Lake
Party	Candidate	Votes	%	±%
Conservative	Jenny Cheng	801	40.3	−0.2
Liberal Democrats	Beth Rowland	682	34.3	+4.1
Labour	Tony Skuse	497	25.0	+9.9
Majority		119	5.9	−4.3
Turnout		1987	45	−29
Conservative gain from Liberal Democrats		Swing	1.9	

Swallowfield
Party	Candidate	Votes	%	±%
Conservative	Stuart Munro	553	68.4	+11.0
Liberal Democrats	Steven Scarrott	134	16.5	+8.4
Labour	James Reid	118	14.6	14.6
Majority		419	51.8	+16.8
Turnout		808	35	0.0
Conservative hold		Swing	9.7	

Winnersh
Party	Candidate	Votes	%	±%
Liberal Democrats	Prue Bray	1,646	62.2	+15.5
Conservative	Ethan Stacey	695	26.2	+5.6
Labour	Steve Stanton	297	11.2	−5.9
Majority		951	35.9	+21.0
Turnout		2644	36	1
Liberal Democrats hold		Swing	4.5	

Wokingham Without
Party	Candidate	Votes	%	±%
Conservative	Angus Ross	1,481	63.3	−1.3
Liberal Democrats	Jordan Montgomery	573	24.5	+16.4
Labour	Yvonne Hignell	272	11.6	−1.0
Majority		908	38.8	−11.1
Turnout		2336	38	−11.9
Conservative hold		Swing	7.5	
