= 2023 Wokingham Borough Council election =

Election of the Council from Thursday 4 May 2023

← 2022	4 May 2023	2024 →

18 out of 54 seats to Wokingham Borough Council 28 seats needed for a majority

	First party	Second party
Leader	Clive Jones	Pauline Jorgensen
Party	Liberal Democrats	Conservative
Leader since	2021	2022
Leader's seat	Hawkedon	Hillside
Seats before	23	26
Seats won	11	4
Seats after	26	22
Seat change	▲3	▼4
	Third party	Fourth party
Leader	Rachel Burgess	N/A
Party	Labour	Independent
Leader since		N/A
Leader's seat	Norreys	N/A
Seats before	3	2
Seats won	3	0
Seats after	5	1
Seat change	▲2	▼1
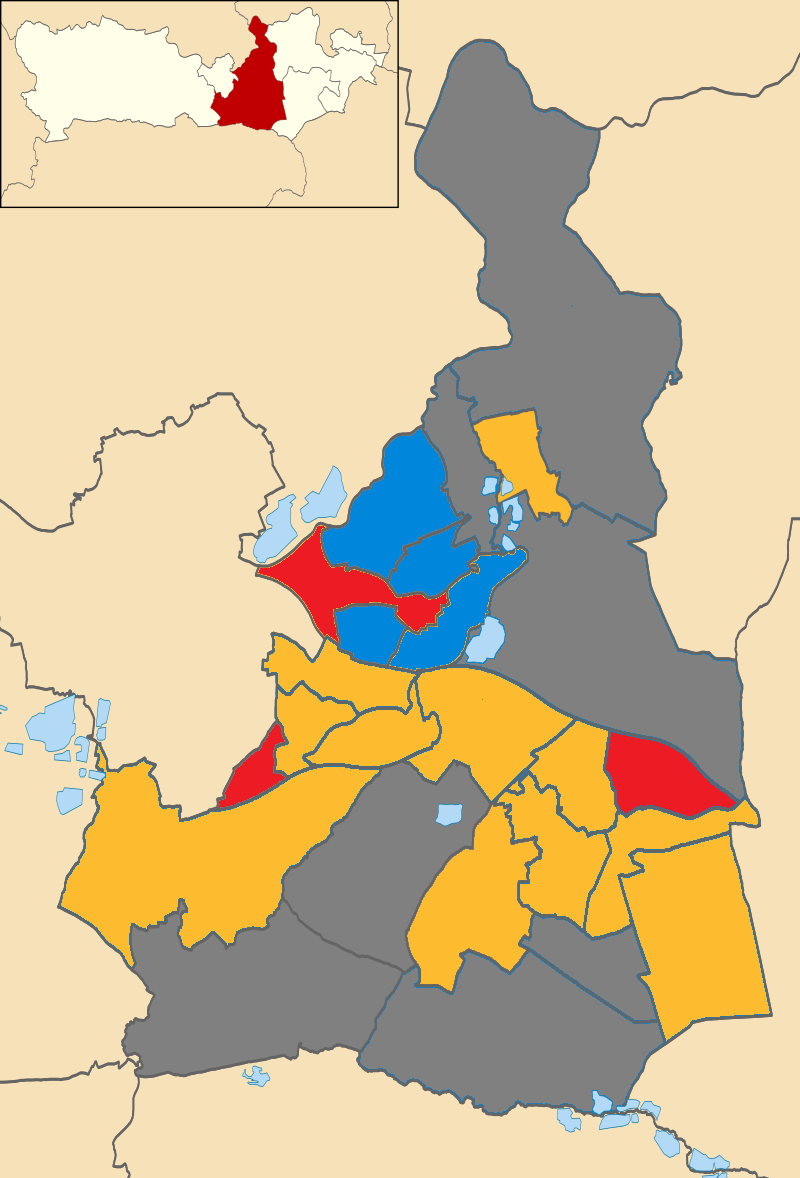
- Ward results map for Wokingham Borough Council
Leader before election
Clive Jones
Liberal Democrat
No overall control
Leader after election
Stephen Conway
Liberal Democrat
No overall control

The 2023 Wokingham Borough Council election took place on Thursday 4 May 2023, to elect members of Wokingham Borough Council in Berkshire, England. This was on the same day as other local elections across England. One third of the council, 18 seats, was up for election.

Prior to the election the council was under no overall control. The Conservatives were the largest party but had lost control following the 2022 election to the "Wokingham Partnership" – a group comprising the Liberal Democrats, Labour and two independent councillors, led by Liberal Democrat leader, Clive Jones. At the 2023 election, the council remained under no overall control, but the Liberal Democrats overtook the Conservatives to become the largest party. At the subsequent annual council meeting on 18 May 2023, Clive Jones stood down as leader of the council, being replaced by new Liberal Democrat leader Stephen Conway.

The composition of the council before the election was as follows:

↓
23	3	2	26
LD	LAB	IND	CON

After the election, the composition of the council became:

↓
26	5	1	22
LD	LAB	IND	CON

== Election summary ==
2023 Wokingham Borough Council election
Party	Candidates	Seats	Gains	Losses	Net gain/loss	Seats %	Votes %	Votes	+/−
Liberal Democrats	17	26	3	0	▲3	48.1	41.3	18,104	▲1.3
Conservative	18	22	0	4	▼4	40.7	36.6	16,058	▼0.3
Labour	18	5	2	0	▲2	9.2	16.3	7,166	▼1.6
Green	8	0	0	0	0	0.0	2.9	1,268	▼0.2
Independent	3	1	0	1	▼1	0.0	1.7	727	▲0.5
Women's Equality	1	0	0	0	0	0.0	0.4	179	▲0.4
Heritage	1	0	0	0	0	0.0	0.2	84	▲0.2

There were a total of 43,802 votes cast with a total of 216 spoiled ballots.

== Ward results ==
Sitting councillors are marked with an asterisk (*).

=== Barkham ===
Barkham
Party	Candidate	Votes	%	±%
Liberal Democrats	Ian Pittock	705	46.7	+4.3
Conservative	George Evans	581	38.5	−11.1
Labour	Annette Medhurst	107	7.1	−0.9
Independent	Roderick Stephens	76	5.0	+5.0
Green	Asad Feroz	40	2.7	+2.7
Majority		124	8.2	+1.0
Total valid votes		1509	99.5	
Rejected ballots		7	0.5	
Turnout		1516	40.6	+7.6
Liberal Democrats gain from Conservative		Swing	+7.7	

=== Bulmershe & Whitegates ===
Bulmershe & Whitegates
Party	Candidate	Votes	%	±%
Labour	Tony Skuse	1,058	40.3	−10.8
Conservative	Sagar Patel	958	36.5	+1.0
Liberal Democrats	Sheila Jordan	375	14.3	+6.4
Green	Samuel Langlois	235	8.9	+3.4
Majority		100	3.8	−11.9
Total valid votes		2626	99.4	
Rejected ballots		15	0.6	
Turnout		2641	38.2	−4.6
Labour hold		Swing	-5.9	

=== Coronation ===
Coronation
Party	Candidate	Votes	%	±%
Conservative	Alison Swaddle*	1,120	61.5	−1.4
Liberal Democrats	Paddy Power	359	19.7	+2.4
Labour	Ian Hills	190	10.4	−2.1
Green	Emma Hamilton	152	8.3	+0.1
Majority		761	41.8	−2.8
Total valid votes		1821	99.6	
Rejected ballots		7	0.4	
Turnout		1828	43.65	−1.83
Conservative hold		Swing	-1.9	

=== Emmbrook ===
Emmbrook
Party	Candidate	Votes	%	±%
Liberal Democrats	Rachel Bishop-Firth*	1,865	57.1	−3.3
Conservative	James Pett	888	27.2	−2.2
Labour	Alwyn Jones	255	7.8	+1.8
Green	Lauren Seymour	156	4.8	+0.6
Heritage	Stephen Priest	84	2.6	+2.6
Majority		977	29.93	−0.7
Total valid votes		3248	99.5	
Rejected ballots		16	0.5	
Turnout		3264	42.69%	+0.13
Liberal Democrats hold		Swing	-0.5	

=== Evendons ===
Evendons
Party	Candidate	Votes	%	±%
Liberal Democrats	Adrian Mather*	1,579	53.2	−11.2
Conservative	Martin Jeater	910	30.6	+3.6
Labour	Timothy Lloyd	279	9.3	+3.8
Women's Equality	Louise Timlin	179	6.0	+6.0
Majority		669	22.5	−14.8
Total valid votes		2947	99.2	
Rejected ballots		23	0.8	
Turnout		2970	42.23%	+0.13
Liberal Democrats hold		Swing	-7.4	

=== Hawkedon ===
Hawkedon
Party	Candidate	Votes	%	±%
Liberal Democrats	Andrew Mickleburgh*	1,269	49.8	−12.8
Conservative	Vishal Srinivasan	962	37.8	+13.6
Labour	Mark Craske	307	12.0	−1.9
Majority		307	12.0	−5.1
Total valid votes		2538	99.7	
Rejected ballots		8	0.3	
Turnout		2546	37.81%	+2.68
Liberal Democrats hold		Swing	-13.2	

=== Hillside ===
Hillside
Party	Candidate	Votes	%	±%
Liberal Democrats	Caroline Smith*	1,346	44.6	−9.5
Conservative	Moses Iyengunmwena	1,319	43.7	+7.3
Labour	Evan Ainsworth	347	11.5	+0.9
Majority		27	0.9	−13.2
Total valid votes		3012	99.7	
Rejected ballots		8	0.3	
Turnout		3020	37.81%	−9.0
Liberal Democrats hold		Swing	-8.4	

=== Loddon ===
Loddon
Party	Candidate	Votes	%	±%
Conservative	Abdul Loyes*	1,136	41.5	+1.8
Labour	Majid Nagra	1,091	39.8	+5.1
Liberal Democrats	Alexander Heap	480	17.5	−10.1
Majority		45	1.64	−3.36
Total valid votes		2707	99.0	
Rejected ballots		28	1.0	
Turnout		2735	36.27%	+3.46
Conservative hold		Swing	-1.6	

=== Maiden Erlegh ===
Maiden Erlegh
Party	Candidate	Votes	%	±%
Liberal Democrats	Stephen Newton	1,318	45.0	−5.8
Conservative	Tim Holton	1,191	40.7	+9.6
Labour	Nagi Nagella	396	13.5	−4.6
Majority		127	4.3	−15.5
Total valid votes		2905	99.2	
Rejected ballots		22	0.8	
Turnout		2927	43.78%	−0.3
Liberal Democrats hold		Swing	-7.7	

=== Norreys ===
Norreys
Party	Candidate	Votes	%	±%
Labour	Marie-Louise Weighill	1,349	42.4	−11.3
Conservative	Mike Townend	1,169	36.8	+2.6
Liberal Democrats	Matteo Fumagalli	639	20.0	+11.1
Majority		180	5.7	−13.8
Total valid votes		3157	99.3	
Rejected ballots		23	0.7	
Turnout		3180	37.74%	−4.48%
Labour gain from Conservative		Swing	-6.9	

=== Shinfield North ===
Shinfield North
Party	Candidate	Votes	%	±%
Labour	Andrew Gray	366	46.4	+7.4
Conservative	Parry Batth*	308	39.0	−2.8
Independent	Tony Johnson	69	8.8	+8.8
Liberal Democrats	Dominic Rider	45	5.7	−13.5
Majority		58	7.4	+4.6
Total valid votes		788	100%	
Rejected ballots		0	0%	
Turnout		788	32.56%	+2.6
Labour gain from Conservative		Swing	+5.1	

=== Shinfield South ===
Shinfield South
Party	Candidate	Votes	%	±%
Liberal Democrats	Catherine Glover	1,047	32.9	−12.3
Conservative	Dave Edmonds	1,012	31.8	−9.0
Independent	Jim Frewin*	582	18.3	+18.3
Labour	Sarah Bell	399	12.5	−1.5
Green	Thomas Blomley	132	4.1	+4.1
Majority		35	1.1	−3.4
Total valid votes		3172	99.7	
Rejected ballots		11	0.3	
Turnout		3183	34.09%	−0.9
Liberal Democrats gain from Independent		Swing	-15.3	

=== Sonning ===
Sonning
Party	Candidate	Votes	%	±%
Conservative	Michael Firmager*	656	59.7	+0.9
Green	Merv Boniface	257	23.4	+4.4
Labour	Philipa Hills	181	16.5	+6.1
Majority		399	36.3	−3.5
Total valid votes		1094	99.6	
Rejected ballots		4	0.4	
Turnout		1098	43.03%	−3.03
Conservative hold		Swing	-1.7	

=== South Lake ===
South Lake
Party	Candidate	Votes	%	±%
Conservative	Laura Blumenthal*	999	51.4	+10.6
Liberal Democrats	Carol Jewel	715	36.8	−11.5
Labour	Ann Dally	217	11.2	0.2
Majority		284	14.6	+7.1
Total valid votes		1931	99.4	
Rejected ballots		12	0.6	
Turnout		1943	45.73%	0.27
Conservative hold		Swing	+11.0	

=== Twyford ===
Twyford
Party	Candidate	Votes	%	±%
Liberal Democrats	Stephen Conway*	1,979	84.1	+13.5
Conservative	Grant Woolner	273	11.6	−12.0
Labour	Caroline Hill	93	4.0	−0.9
Majority		1706	72.6	+25.7
Total valid votes		2345	99.7	
Rejected ballots		6	0.3	
Turnout		2351	51.77%	−2.23
Liberal Democrats hold		Swing	+12.7	

=== Wescott ===
Wescott
Party	Candidate	Votes	%	±%
Liberal Democrats	Jane Ainslie	1,172	53.6	+9.4
Conservative	David Lee	700	32.0	−10.4
Labour	Alex Freeney	160	7.3	−4.8
Green	Dave Chapman	150	6.9	+6.9
Majority		472	21.6	+19.9
Total valid votes		2182	99.7	
Rejected ballots		6	0.3	
Turnout		2188	39.65%	−3.35
Liberal Democrats hold		Swing	+9.9	

=== Winnersh ===
Winnersh
Party	Candidate	Votes	%	±%
Liberal Democrats	Paul Fishwick*	1,643	60.6	−3.2
Conservative	Anthony Pollock	682	25.1	+0.2
Labour	Alan Murungi	231	8.5	+1.4
Green	Stephen Lloyd	146	5.4	+1.2
Majority		961	35.4	−3.5
Total valid votes		2702	99.6	
Rejected ballots		10	0.4	
Turnout		2712	34.74%	+0.39
Liberal Democrats hold		Swing	-1.7	

=== Wokingham Without ===
Wokingham Without
Party	Candidate	Votes	%	±%
Liberal Democrats	Jordan Montgomery	1,568	53.8	+12.9
Conservative	Christopher Bowring*	1,194	41.0	−7.0
Labour	Rona Noble	140	4.8	−2.5
Majority		374	12.8	+6.6
Total valid votes		2902	99.7	
Rejected ballots		10	0.3	
Turnout		2912	46.11%	+11.76
Liberal Democrats gain from Conservative		Swing	+9.9	

== Council Membership by party after each election 2010–2023 ==
Election results 2010–2023
Party	2010	2011	2012	2014	2015	2016	2018	2019	2021	2022	2023
Conservative	43	45	43	44	47	47	42	31	31	26	22
Liberal Democrats	11	9	10	7	5	5	8	16	18	23	26
Labour	0	0	0	1	1	1	3	4	3	3	5
Other parties	0	0	1	2	1	1	1	3	2	2	1
Total Seats	54	54	54	54	54	54	54	54	54	54	54
