= British National (Overseas) passport =

British passport for persons with BN(O) status

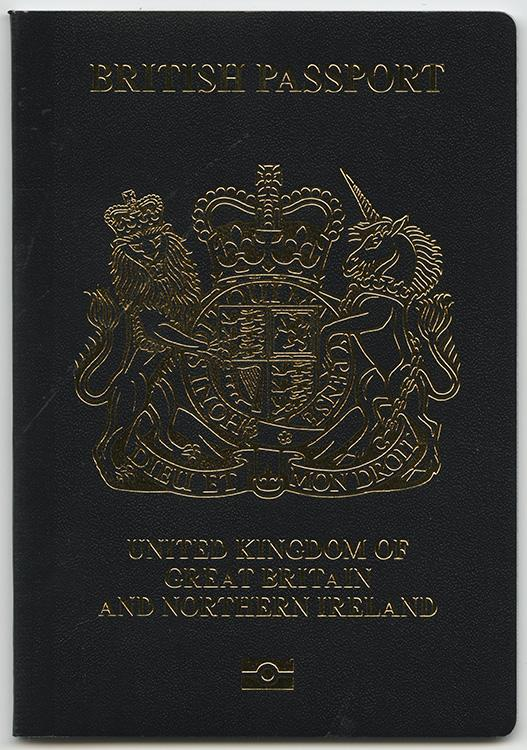
- Front cover of the current British National (Overseas) passport (with chip), issued since March 2020
- Type: Passport
- Issued by: His Majesty's Government
- First issued: 1 July 1987 (first version); 1 June 1990 (machine-readable passport); 2005 (first biometric version); 2020 (biometric version with polycarbonate data page)
- Purpose: British nationality identification and international travel document
- Eligibility: British National (Overseas) status
- Rights: Hold a British passport and get consular help and protection from UK diplomatic posts. BN(O) status holders, or their first generation adult descendants born after 30 June 1979, can live, study and work in the UK for unlimited period with a valid BN(O) visa, with a path to getting UK settlement, and then British citizenship.

British National (Overseas) passport
- Traditional Chinese: 英國國民(海外)護照
Transcriptions
Yue: Cantonese
- Jyutping: jing1 gwok3 gwok3 man4 (hoi2 ngoi6) wu6 ziu3

The British National (Overseas) passport, commonly referred to as the BN(O) passport, is a British passport for people with British National (Overseas) status. BN(O) status was created in 1987 after the enactment of Hong Kong Act 1985, whose holders are permanent residents of Hong Kong who were British Overseas Territories citizens (formerly British Dependent Territories citizens) until 30 June 1997 and had registered as BN(O)s.

BN(O) status holders do not have the automatic right of abode in the United Kingdom unless they are also British citizens. Since 31 January 2021, BN(O) holders have been able to apply for limited leave to remain to live, work and study in the UK. They become eligible for settled status (indefinite leave to remain) after 5 years of qualifying residence. BN(O) holders with settled status can register as British citizens after 12 months.

The settlement scheme was launched after the imposition of the controversial 2020 national security law on Hong Kong by the Chinese Central government. The UK considers the enactment of the National Security Law a clear violation of the one country, two systems principle guaranteed in the Sino-British Joint Declaration, an international binding treaty signed in 1984.

== Physical appearance ==
=== Cover ===
BN(O) passports are currently issued in their latest biometric versions (as of 2020) and they bear the "electronic travel document symbol" on the navy blue coloured cover. The text United Kingdom of Great Britain and Northern Ireland is present below the coat of arms of the United Kingdom; the wording British Passport is printed above the coat of arms.

=== Holder's page ===
The holder's page, or biographical data page, is identical to the identification page of British Citizen passports with the nationality being indicated as British National (Overseas). The machine-readable zone starts with PGBR or PPGBR, indicating the United Kingdom of Great Britain and Northern Ireland as the passport's issuing country. The request page, made in the name of the 'Secretary of State' (currently the Secretary of State for Foreign and Commonwealth Affairs), is also identical to that of a British Citizen passport. The nationality on the machine readable zone, however, is GBN rather than GBR.

Each biometric BN(O) passport contains a contactless chip, which stores digital data and includes the holder's personal data, on the Endorsement page.

== Popularity ==
=== Initial rollout ===
Since the start of registration for the British National (Overseas) nationality on 1 July 1987, permanent residents of Hong Kong who were British Dependent Territories Citizens could either remain as BDTCs or register for the new type of nationality. People who chose to remain as BDTCs, however, would only be able to renew their BDTC passports for a restricted validity until 30 June 1997, while those who registered as BN(O)s would receive BN(O) passports valid for a full ten years.

Registration for the BN(O) passports was not regarded as a popular, practical option during the early years (e.g. from 1 July 1987 to 21 December 1989, only 15% of newly issued passports were of the BN(O) type; the majority still held the British Dependent Territories Citizen passports). Permanent residents of Hong Kong had until 30 June 1997 to voluntarily register themselves as a British National (Overseas).

=== After the transfer of sovereignty over Hong Kong ===
After the transfer of sovereignty of Hong Kong to the People's Republic of China on 1 July 1997, the British National (Overseas) passport became the most popular travel document among the people of Hong Kong. From April 1997 to the end of 2006, the British government has issued a total of 794,457 BN(O) passports. The peak was reached in 2001, when 170,000 were issued in a single year.

Hong Kong permanent residents who are Chinese nationals can also opt for the Hong Kong SAR passport. By 2015, the less-expensive Hong Kong SAR passport has been granted visa-free access to more than 150 countries and territories. This makes the number of visa-free countries of the BN(O) passport comparatively smaller. As a result, only 30,000 BN(O) passports were issued in 2006 against an expectation of a peak in passport renewals.

=== From 2007 onwards ===
As of May 2007, there were 800,000 holders of valid BN(O) passports. Some 2.6 million out of the 3.4 million British Nationals (Overseas) did not renew their passports upon expiry.

As British National (Overseas) cannot be passed through jus sanguinis to children of current BN(O)s, any children born on or after 1 July 1997 to parents with British National (Overseas) status only acquired either Chinese nationality or British Overseas Citizen status at birth (although it is possible for a BOC with no other nationalities to be registered as a British citizen). Any British Dependent Territory Citizens with connections to Hong Kong who had failed to register themselves as British Nationals (Overseas) by the end of 30 June 1997 would also be ineligible to make further claims for BN(O) from 1 July 1997, and those people would either become Chinese nationals or British Overseas Citizens.

During and after the 2014 Hong Kong Protests, many BN(O) holders began to renew their passports with 22,022 renewals in 2014, this was up from 7,654 in 2011. The pace of BN(O) passports issued substantially quickened beginning in 2019, with over 150,000 granted in 2019 and over 215,000 granted in 2020. The pace substantially quickened after the UK government announced planned improvements into immigration and residency rights for BN(O) holders in July 2020, with 59,798 issued in October 2020 alone.

As of 24 February 2020, there were 349,881 holders of BN(O) passports and the UK Home office estimates that there are around 2.9m BN(O)s in Hong Kong. By the end of 2023, there were 719,973 valid BN(O) passports in circulation.

Number of valid BN(O) passports in circulation
Date	Number
May 2007	800,000
31 December 2015	143,200
24 February 2020	349,881
17 April 2020	357,156
2 October 2020	469,416
31 December 2020	622,981
31 December 2021	679,787
31 December 2022	708,838
31 December 2023	719,973
31 December 2024	718,725
31 December 2025	710,369

== Previous versions of BN(O) passports ==
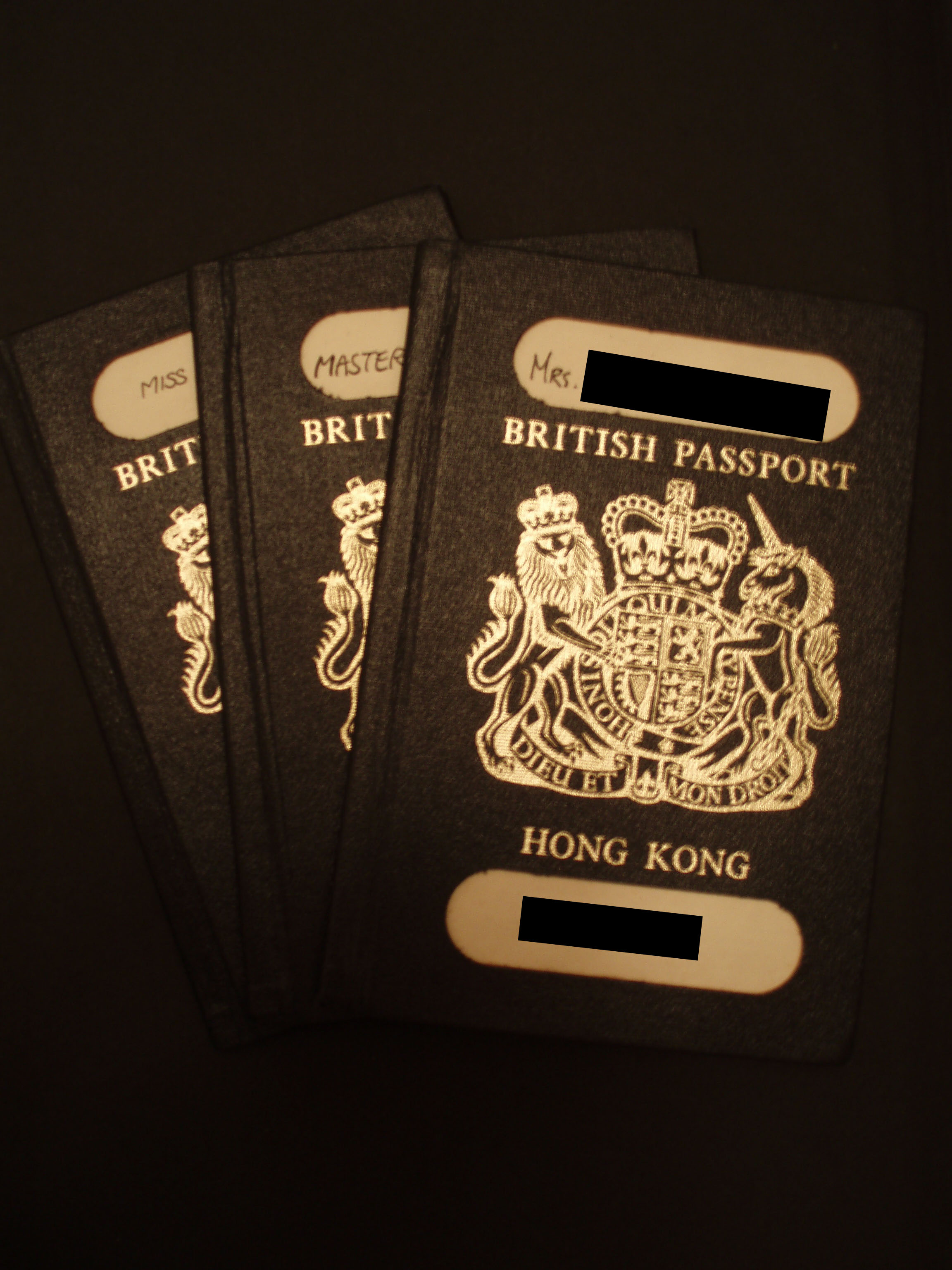
"Old blue" British Dependent Territories passports, issued prior to 1990.

The cover of the passport was originally navy blue, as with all other types of British passport. Earlier, residents of Hong Kong were Citizen of the United Kingdom and Colonies and their relevant passports bore the texts British Passport at the top and Hong Kong at the bottom of the cover.

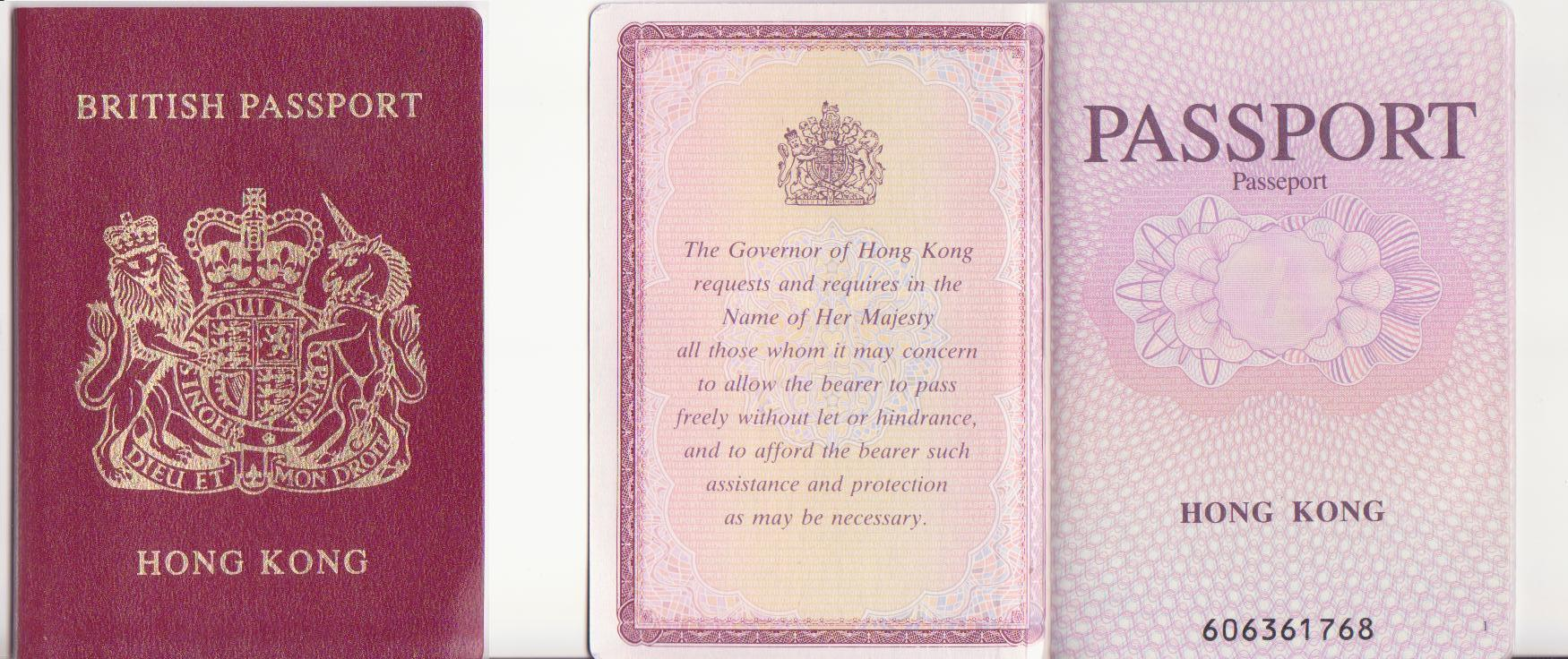
British Dependent Territory machine-readable passport, issued between 1990 and 1997. The BN(O) version had a slightly different layout, with the word 'Passport' in block capitals at the bottom of the page, and the words 'United Kingdom of Great Britain and Northern Ireland' in the space at the top.

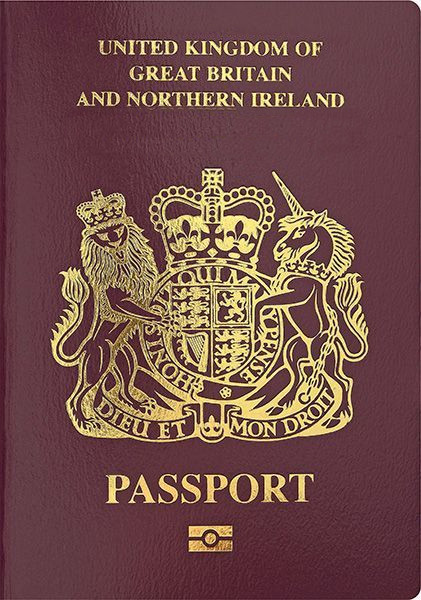
BN(O) passport (without the words "European Union"), issued between 1997 and 2020 (biometric symbol added 2006).

When machine-readable passports were introduced on 1 June 1990, the cover colour was changed to burgundy. Between 1997 and March 2020, passports sported a burgundy red cover identical to that of the British Citizen passports, albeit without the "European Union" text at the top of the cover. These words were featured in the latter until April 2019, when the words were removed, causing their front covers to become identical in appearance to those of BN(O), British Overseas Citizen, British Protected Person and British Subject passports: the text United Kingdom of Great Britain and Northern Ireland above the coat of arms of the United Kingdom; the word Passport printed below the coat of arms, and the "electronic travel document symbol" at the bottom.

== Endorsements ==
=== Hong Kong immigration observations ===
The British National (Overseas) status itself does not automatically grant the right of abode anywhere (including the United Kingdom and Hong Kong). BN(O) holders would have had right of abode in Hong Kong before 1 July 1997. The following Hong Kong immigration observation is printed in BN(O) passports:

The holder of this passport has Hong Kong permanent identity card number XXXXXXX(X) which states that the holder has the right of abode in Hong Kong.

If the BN(O) holder is unable to produce their acceptable Hong Kong permanent identity card or a valid HKSAR passport to prove their right of abode in Hong Kong, this observation is not printed in their BN(O) passport.

=== UK immigration observations ===
British National (Overseas) citizens who are also a British citizen do not have UK immigration observations added to their BN(O) passport.

British Nationals (Overseas) citizens who are not also a British citizen enjoy visa-free access to the UK for up to six months as a visitor. The following statement is printed in BN(O) passports:

In accordance with UK immigration rules the holder of this passport does not require an entry certificate or visa to visit the UK.

BN(O) holders are however eligible to apply for limited leave to remain to live, work or study in the UK, with more favourable immigration conditions than being a visitor.

According to the latest BN(O) passport processing guideline issued by the Home Office in September 2021, the following observation (STC) must be entered onto BN(O) passports, where the holder does not have right of abode in the UK:

The holder is subject to control under Immigration Act 1971.

Under British Nationality Act 1981, British citizenship is conferred to CUKCs who had the right of abode in the UK as defined under Immigration Act 1971. Former HK-CUKCs who had their CUKC passports issued before 1 January 1973 within the common travel area, but did not qualify for right of abode on 31 December 1982, for example by not having been a UK ordinary resident for at least 5 years after becoming settled, on or before 31 December 1982, became HK-BDTCs after 31 December 1982 and retained the following observation in their BN(O) passports:

The holder is entitled to re-admission to the United Kingdom.

Under Paragraph 17 of HC 395, British passports holders with this observation are entitled to re-admission as a returning resident at any time, regardless of how long they have spent outside the United Kingdom.

=== Circulating obsolete observations ===
BN(O) passports issued between 30 March 2019 and 31 December 2020 (the UK's transition period for leaving the EU) contain the following observation, to be phased out by 1 January 2031:

The Holder is not entitled to benefit from European Union provisions relating to employment or establishment.

Since 31 January 2021, the HKSAR government no longer verifies the immigration status of BN(O) passport holders in Hong Kong. As a result, the observation regarding the Right to Land in Hong Kong is not printed in BN(O) passports from 31 January 2021. All existing passports with this observation will expire by 1 February 2032.

== Criticism ==
The British National (Overseas) passports have been criticised for being too expensive, as compared to the HKSAR Passport, which has so far gained visa-free access from a similar number of countries as has the BN(O). In December 2013, the Foreign and Commonwealth Office of the United Kingdom announced backsourcing of overseas passport processing to their HM Passport Services in Liverpool. As a result, the fee for renewing BN(O) passports was reduced by 35% as of April 2014.

=== Counterfeit scandal in the 1990s ===
In the early years after the transfer of sovereignty over Hong Kong in 1997, the issue of counterfeit British National (Overseas) passports aroused international attention and government scrutiny, as such passports were being manufactured and used by illegal immigrants from the mainland of the People's Republic of China, who wished to gain direct access to the United Kingdom by way of Hong Kong.

Upon crossing the Hong Kong–mainland China border, those illegal immigrants were easily detected by Hong Kong immigration officers, since the Mandarin-speaking immigrants invariably failed to understand or respond to officers communicating in Cantonese, the first language among Hong Kong's native population.

With the introduction of biometric passports, the BN(O) passport has recovered credibility among the international community. Most immigration officers at major British and European ports of entry have been briefed on the six different classes of British nationality, so that they do not confuse a person using his or her BN(O) passport to cross the borders with other types of British nationals..

== Use in Hong Kong ==
Since July 1997, Hong Kong Immigration Department no longer issues BN(O) passports.

Until 30 January 2021, BN(O) passport holders with the right of abode in Hong Kong could use their BN(O) passports to clear immigration control.

On 29 January 2021, Associated Press reported that the Chinese Foreign Ministry spokesperson Zhao Lijian announced: "China would no longer recognise BN(O) passports starting from 31 January," in retaliation to the extension of BN(O) civil rights in the UK. On the same day, a similar press release from the Government of Hong Kong, said that starting 31 January 2021, British National (Overseas) passports would no longer be recognised as a proof of identity in Hong Kong and no longer be recognised for immigration clearance by the Immigration Department.

Following media enquiries, several countries and regions announced that they would continue to recognise BN(O) passports, including the United States, Canada, Australia, Germany, France, Spain, Taiwan, Japan, Italy, South Korea, Netherlands, New Zealand, Malaysia, Singapore, Finland and Norway.

== Use in mainland China and Macau ==
From 31 January 2021, BN(O) passports are no longer recognised as valid documents in mainland China and Macau. Hong Kong Permanent residents must use other travel documents such as Mainland Travel Permit and Hong Kong Identity Card.

== Use in the United Kingdom ==
British Nationals (Overseas) are British nationals but not British citizens. They are not considered 'foreign aliens' under UK law. BN(O) holders do not need to apply for residence permits if they remain in the United Kingdom for up to 6 months. As Commonwealth citizens, BN(O) holders who have leave to remain for longer than 6 months are eligible to register as a voter in the UK. They are also able to apply to join HM Civil Service or HM Armed Forces. After the passage of Hong Kong national security law, the UK government made it possible for BN(O) citizens to move to the UK permanently.

Before July 2020, BN(O) holders could visit the UK for up to six months (or three months when arriving from the Republic of Ireland). For longer stays or other purposes of visit, they needed to apply for the appropriate visas at UK diplomatic missions overseas. BN(O) holders are currently ineligible to request the Registered Traveller service for using automatic e-gates at UK borders.

Since 31 January 2021, BN(O) holders are able to apply for a visa which confers the right to work and study in the UK (known as the BN(O) visa). After continuous residence for five years, BN(O) holders, like those of other qualifying immigrants in the UK, are eligible to apply for settlement, officially called indefinite leave to remain (ILR). They can subsequently register as a British citizen after they have gained ILR for one year.

Since 5 March 2021, BN(O) visa holder with 'imminent risk of destitution' will be able to apply for public funds on a case-by-case basis.

Since 30 November 2022, the first generation adult descendants of BN(O) status holders can apply for the BN(O) visa. Applicants must be born after 30 June 1997, and can bring their qualifying dependents to come to live, work or study in the UK with a route to settlement and citizenship.

In the 2023 United Kingdom local elections, Ying Lisa Shayne Perrett, a first-time BNO holder, was successfully elected as a councillor for the Bisley and West End constituency in the 2023 Surrey Heath Borough election after the Greater London Authority confirmed BN(O) have full voting rights on 2022. Perrett would be joined by Andy Ng, elected through the seat of Maiden Erlegh and Whitegates in the Wokingham Borough Council in the 2024 local elections, and Justin Ko, co-opted Town Councillor of Bletchley and Fenny Stratford Council, on 6 May 2025, for Manor North & Eaton Leys.

== Immigration, borders and visas ==
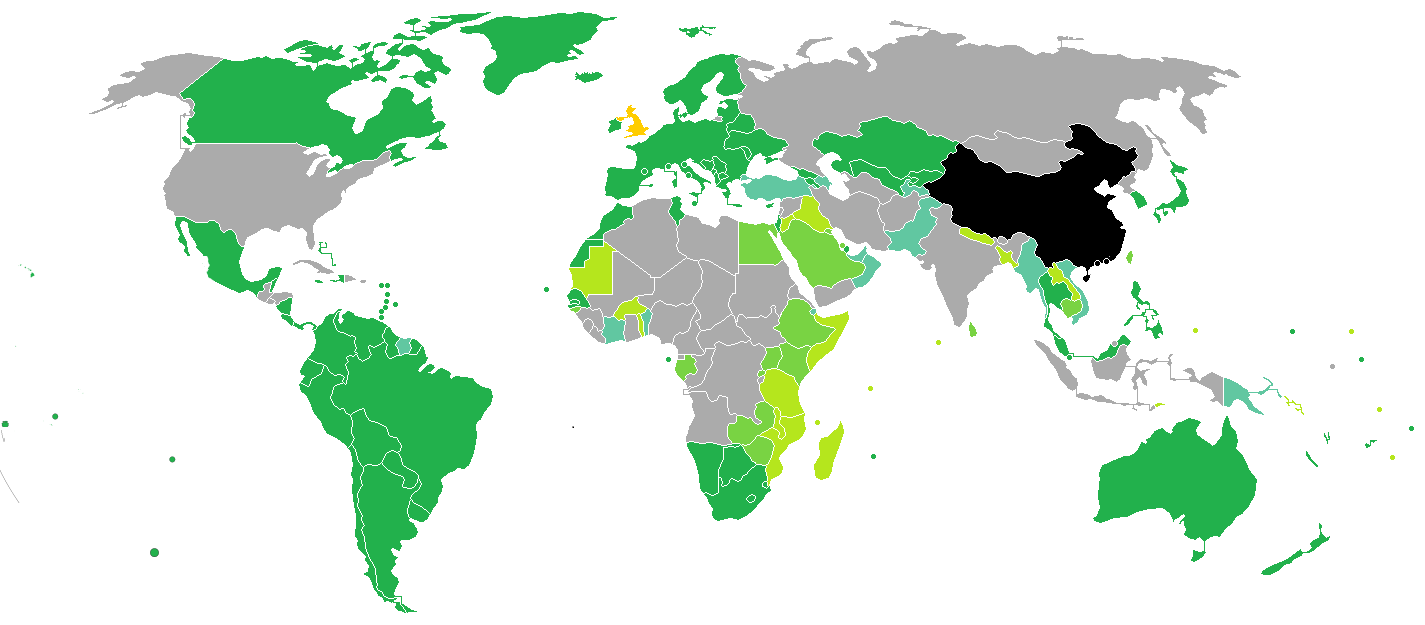
Countries and territories with visa-free or visa-on-arrival entries for British Nationals (Overseas)

=== Hong Kong ===
BN(O) passport holders who possess right of abode in Hong Kong normally use their permanent identity cards to enter Hong Kong. As of 31 January 2021, BN(O) passports are no longer recognised as a legal travel document to enter or exit Hong Kong.

=== Macau ===
BN(O) passport holders normally use their Hong Kong identity card to enter Macau, allowing them to visit Macau for up to 1 year. As of 31 January 2021, BN(O) passports are no longer recognised as a legal travel document to enter Macau.

=== Mainland China ===
British National (Overseas) status is not recognized by the Government of China, so BN(O) passports are not recognized by mainland China ports of entry controlled by the Ministry of Public Security. In addition, the Government of Hong Kong does not allow BN(O)s to renounce their Chinese citizenship pursuant to the nationality law of the People's Republic of China. Therefore, BN(O)s who wish to visit mainland China must obtain a Mainland Travel Permit for Hong Kong and Macao Residents in advance. Starting from 29 January 2021, China no longer recognises BN(O) passports for travel or identification.

=== Taiwan ===
The Taiwanese government continues to recognise BN(O) passports as valid travel documents. To enter Taiwan, BN(O)s must obtain an ″Exit & Entry Permit″ which can be obtained either online at no cost or on arrival for a fee. British officials are able to provide consular assistance to BN(O) holders in Taiwan.

=== Working Holiday Visas ===
BN(O) passports can be used to apply for working holiday visas in countries where Hong Kong has established a bilateral Working Holiday Scheme. Holders of BN(O) passport are not subject to the annual quota of 1,000 in the UK. In late March 2021, the Hong Kong government told 14 countries to stop accepting a BN(O) passport for an application for a working holiday visa. However, the British foreign office reminded the Hong Kong government that it had no authority to dictate what passports other countries can recognise, and that BN(O) passports would remain valid British travel documents worldwide. None of the 14 countries accepted the Hong Kong government's demand.

Starting from 1 July 2023, BN(O) passport holders are eligible for Australian working holiday visa arrangements in line with British citizen passport holders, under the free trade agreement negotiated between British and Australian governments.

== See also ==
- Visa requirements for British Nationals (Overseas)
- British nationality law
- British passport
- Karta Polaka
