= Hong Kong Passport =

The term "Hong Kong passport" can refer to the following passports which are used primarily by residents of Hong Kong:

- Contemporary passports
  - British National (Overseas) passport, which is a type of British passport
  - Hong Kong Special Administrative Region passport, a type of Chinese passport
- Defunct passport
  - The passport for British Dependent Territories citizen Hong Kong passport, which is an older type of British passport
