= 2026 Wokingham Borough Council election =

Local election in Berkshire, England

- 7 May 2026

19 out of 54 seats to Wokingham Borough Council (including 1 by-election) 27 seats needed for a majority
	First party	Second party	Third party
Leader	Stephen Conway	Pauline Jorgensen	Rachel Burgess
Party	Liberal Democrats	Conservative	Labour
Last election	29 seats, 34.7%	19 seats, 29.2%	5 seats, 6.8%
Seats before	28 (Note: Including vacant seat at Wokingham Without last held by a Liberal Democrat.)	19	5
Seats after	29	19	5
	Fourth party	Fifth party
Party	Green	Independent
Last election	0 seats, 6.8%	0 seats, 0.0%
Seats before	1	1
Seats after	1	0
- Results by ward
Leader before election
Stephen Conway
Liberal Democrats
Leader after election
Stephen Conway
Liberal Democrats

The 2026 Wokingham Borough Council election was held on 7 May 2026, alongside the other local elections across the United Kingdom being held on the same day, to elect 19 of 54 members of Wokingham Borough Council.

The election saw the council remain under Liberal Democrat majority control.

As Wokingham is already a unitary authority. It will not be affected by the ongoing local government reorganisation that is happening in some areas of the country.

== Council composition ==
After 2024 election		After 2026 election	
Party	Seats	Party	Seats
Liberal Democrats	27	Liberal Democrats	29 (Note: Includes the vacant seat in Wokingham Without last held by the Liberal Democrats.)
Conservative	19	Conservative	19
Labour	8	Labour	5
Independent	0	Independent	0
Green	0	Green	1

The composition of the council before the election was as follows:

↓
28	5	1	1	19
LD	LAB	GRE	IND	CON

After the election, the composition of the council became:

↓
29	5	1	19
LD	LAB	GRE	CON

Changes 2024–2026:

- October 2024: Sarah Bell (Labour) resigns – by-election held December 2024
- November 2024: Paul Fishwick (Liberal Democrats) dies – by-election held February 2025
- December 2024: Jackie Rance (Conservative) gains by-election from Labour
- Alex Freeney (Labour) suspended from party
- February 2025: Chetna Jamthe (Liberal Democrats) wins by-election
- March 2025: Norman Jorgensen (Conservative) dies – by-election held June 2025
- June 2025: Mike Smith (Liberal Democrats) gains by-election from Conservatives
- September 2025: Majid Nagra (Labour) leaves party to sit as an independent
- March 2026: Majid Nagra (Independent) joins the Green Party
- March 2026: Jordan Montgomery (Liberal Democrats) stands down due to ill health

== Summary ==
=== Background ===
In 2026, Wokingham Borough Council remained under control of the Liberal Democrats

2026 Wokingham Borough Council election
Party	Candidates	Seats	Gains	Losses	Net gain/loss	Seats %	Votes %	Votes	+/−
Liberal Democrats	19	29	2	1	▲1	53.7%	34.7%	23,375	-6.5%
Conservative	19	19	2	2	0	35.2%	29.2%	19,712	-8.7%
Reform	19	0	0	0	0	0.0%	18.5%	12,476	18.5%
Green	19	1	0	0	0	1.9%	9.6%	6,480	0.4%
Labour	19	5	0	0	0	9.2%	6.8%	4,593	-11.3%
Independent	1	0	0	1	▼1	0.0%	0.8%	530	0.6%
TUSC	2	0	0	0	0	0.0%	0.1%	75	0.0%

There were a total of 67,400 votes cast with a total of 159 spoiled ballots.

== Incumbents ==
Ward	Incumbent councillor	Party	Re-standing
Barkham & Arborfield	George Evans	Conservative	No
Bulmershe & Coronation	Yusra Salman	Conservative	Yes
Emmbrook	Basit Alvi	Liberal Democrats	Yes
Evendons	Adrian Mather	Liberal Democrats	No
Finchampstead	Peter Harper	Conservative	Yes
Hawkedon	Melanie De Jong	Liberal Democrats	Yes
Hillside	Caroline Smith	Liberal Democrats	Yes
Loddon	Alex Freeney (Note: Originally elected as Labour, but was suspended from the party in December 2024 and now sits as an independent.)	Independent	No
Maiden Erlegh & Whitegates	Andy Siu-Hong Ng	Liberal Democrats	Yes
Norreys	Nagi Nagella	Labour	Yes
Shinfield	Vishal Srinivasan	Conservative	Yes
South Lake	Carol Jewell	Liberal Democrats	Yes
Spencers Wood & Swallowfield	Stuart Munro	Conservative	No
Thames	Katrin Harding	Liberal Democrats	Yes
Twyford, Ruscombe & Hurst	Martijn Andrea	Liberal Democrats	Yes
Wescott	Chris Cooke	Liberal Democrats	Yes
Winnersh	Chetna Jamthe (Note: Elected at the 2025 Winnersh by-election.)	Liberal Democrats	Yes
Wokingham Without	Séona Turtle	Conservative	Yes
Wokingham Without	Jordan Montgomery (Note: Stood down due to ill health.)	Liberal Democrats	No

== Candidates & Results ==
Sitting councillors standing for re-election are marked with an asterisk (*).

=== Barkham & Arborfield ===
Barkham and Arborfield Election - Results by Party in 2026
1. Liberal Democrats (UK) (39.6%)
2. Conservative Party (UK) (25.8%)
3. Labour Party (UK) (3.70%)
4. Green Party of England and Wales (8.00%)
5. Reform UK (23.0%)

Barkham & Arborfield was formed in 2024 from the former single-member wards of Barkham and Arborfield, plus the western part of Finchampstead South centred on Arborfield Green, and a very small part of the former Swallowfield ward.[6]

The Reform UK candidate, Christopher Bowring, had previously sat as a Conservative councillor for Wokingham Without.

Barkham & Arborfield
Party	Candidate	Votes	%	±%
Liberal Democrats	Mohima Bose	1,328	39.6	−3.7
Conservative	Sebastian Graabek	866	25.8	−15.6
Reform	Christopher Bowring	769	23.0	23.0
Green	Asad Feroz	267	8.0	3.2
Labour	Isla Sykes	123	3.7	−6.7
Majority		462	13.8	
Total valid votes		3,353	99.6	
Rejected ballots		12	0.3	
Turnout		3365	40.34	8.14
Liberal Democrats gain from Conservative		Swing		

=== Bulmershe & Coronation ===
Bulmershe & Coronation Election - Results by Party in 2026
1. Liberal Democrats (UK) (16.9%)
2. Conservative Party (UK) (35.7%)
3. Labour Party (UK) (13.0%)
4. Green Party of England and Wales (13.5%)
5. Reform UK (20.8%)

Bulmershe & Coronation contains almost all of the former Coronation ward, the part of the former Sonning ward which was in the parish of Woodley, and much of the Bulmershe part of the three-member Bulmershe and Whitegates ward. In 2024, these areas were merged to make the Bulmershe & Coronation ward.

The Labour Councillor, Andy Croy, has previously been a Councillor for the former Bulmershe and Whitegates ward.

Bulmershe & Coronation
Party	Candidate	Votes	%	±%
Conservative	Yusra Salman*	1,238	35.7	−14.4
Reform	Kai Meade	722	20.8	20.8
Liberal Democrats	Shiela Jordan	584	16.9	−4.4
Green	Laurence Beard	468	13.5	6.6
Labour	Andy Croy	452	13.0	−8.2
Majority		516	14.9	
Total valid votes		3464	99.7	
Rejected ballots		11	0.3	
Turnout		3474	48.55	5.4
Conservative hold		Swing		

=== Emmbrook ===
Emmbrook Election - Results by Party in 2026
1. Liberal Democrats (UK) (45.0%)
2. Conservative Party (UK) (24.4%)
3. Labour Party (UK) (3.90%)
4. Green Party of England and Wales (9.90%)
5. Reform UK (16.5%)

Emmbrook ward has not had any boundary changes in recent years, and Councillor Basit Alvi was an incumbent Councillor for the Liberal Democrats and was successfully re-elected.

Emmbrook
Party	Candidate	Votes	%	±%
Liberal Democrats	Basit Alvi*	1,854	45.0	−10.0
Conservative	James Westhorpe	1005	24.4	−6.1
Reform	John Clarke	678	16.5	16.5
Green	Mark Vernon	406	9.9	5.9
Labour	Gopi Kolluru	159	3.9	−6.3
Majority		849	20.6	
Total valid votes		4102	99.7	
Rejected ballots		14	0.3	
Turnout		4116	50.65	10.0
Liberal Democrats hold		Swing		

=== Evendons ===
Evendons Election - Results by Party in 2026
1. Liberal Democrats (UK) (39.5%)
2. Conservative Party (UK) (26.2%)
3. Labour Party (UK) (5.80%)
4. Green Party of England and Wales (9.10%)
5. Reform UK (19.2%)

Evendons was not affected by any recent boundary changes. In this election, the incumbent Liberal Democrat councillor, Adrian Mather, was standing down, and Richa Singh was successfully elected in his place.

Evendons
Party	Candidate	Votes	%	±%
Liberal Democrats	Richa Singh	1,382	39.5	−18.0
Conservative	Bjorn Graabek	915	26.2	−4.8
Reform	Jeremy Field	672	19.2	19.2
Green	Joe Hughes	319	9.1	0.1
Labour	Annette Medhurst	203	5.8	−4.0
Majority		467	13.3	
Total valid votes		3491	99.8	
Rejected ballots		7	0.2	
Turnout		3498	48.98	6.78
Liberal Democrats hold		Swing		

=== Finchampstead ===
Finchampstead Election - Results by Party in 2026
1. Liberal Democrats (UK) (31.0%)
2. Conservative Party (UK) (38.6%)
3. Labour Party (UK) (2.70%)
4. Green Party of England and Wales (6.20%)
5. Reform UK (21.3%)

Finchampstead was formed in 2024 by merging Finchampstead North with most of Finchampstead South. This excluded the western part of the ward centred on Arborfield Green, which is now part of Barkham & Arborfield.

Peter Harper was one of three incumbent Conservative councillors for Finchampstead ward.

Finchampstead
Party	Candidate	Votes	%	±%
Conservative	Peter Harper*	1,630	38.6	−10.6
Liberal Democrats	Laurent Seraphin	1310	31.0	−12.8
Reform	Stephen Surpless	902	21.3	21.3
Green	Shannon Carter	262	6.2	6.2
Labour	Jac Pluves	115	2.7	−3.9
Majority		320	7.6	
Total valid votes		4219		
Rejected ballots		8	0.19	
Turnout		4227	52.13	7.33
Conservative hold		Swing		

=== Hawkedon ===
Hawkedon Election - Results by Party in 2026
1. Liberal Democrats (UK, 2025) (35.8%)
2. Conservative Party (UK) (31.8%)
3. Labour Party (UK) (6.20%)
4. Green Party of England and Wales (9.70%)
5. Reform UK (16.3%)

Hawkedon ward has had no recent changes and this ward was won by Melanie De Jong, who is the incumbent Liberal Democrat councillor.

Hawkedon
Party	Candidate	Votes	%	±%
Liberal Democrats	Melanie De Jong*	1,270	35.8	−8.2
Conservative	Micheal Firmager	1127	31.8	−10.5
Reform	Sol Viliaverde	578	16.3	16.5
Green	Tom Milne	343	9.7	9.7
Labour	Mark Craske	220	6.2	−7.1
Majority		143	4.0	
Total valid votes		3538		
Rejected ballots		6	0.2	
Turnout		3544	46.12	3.52
Liberal Democrats hold		Swing		

=== Hillside ===
Hillside Election - Results by Party in 2026
1. Liberal Democrats (UK, 2025) (37.3%)
2. Conservative Party (UK) (32.8%)
3. Labour Party (UK) (5.40%)
4. Green Party of England and Wales (10.1%)
5. Reform UK (14.0%)

From 2024, Hillside ward included much of the area of the Reading University campus, previously part of the former Maiden Erlegh ward. Caroline Smith was the incumbent Liberal Democrat councillor who retained her seat in this election.

Nick Kilby has previously been a Conservative councillor for Kingston.

Hillside
Party	Candidate	Votes	%	±%
Liberal Democrats	Caroline Smith*	1,485	37.3	−3.3
Conservative	Nick Kilby	1305	32.8	−11.4
Reform	Amy Robins	557	14.0	14.0
Green	Russell Seymour	403	10.1	6.5
Labour	Evan Ainsworth	216	5.4	−6.9
Majority		180	4.5	
Total valid votes		3966		
Rejected ballots		12	0.3	
Turnout		3978	52.51	5.81
Liberal Democrats hold		Swing		

=== Loddon ===
Loddon Election - Results by Party in 2026
1. Liberal Democrats (UK) (12.7%)
2. Conservative Party (UK) (29.5%)
3. Labour Party (UK) (18.8%)
4. Green Party of England and Wales (17.0%)
5. Reform UK (21.6%)

Loddon had elected three Labour councillors in 2024, but Alex Freeney was suspended from the Labour party and did not stand again in this election. Majid Nagra has now joined the Green Party and sits as the only Green Party member on Wokingham Borough Council. Currently, Greg Bello is the one remaining Labour Party councillor in Loddon.

David Bragg is also a Conservative councillor for Woodley Town Council.

Loddon
Party	Candidate	Votes	%	±%
Conservative	David Bragg	908	29.5	−8.4
Reform	Lance Tyrrill	664	21.6	21.6
Labour	Rona Noble	580	18.8	−31.0
Green	Stuart Simpson	522	17.0	17.0
Liberal Democrats	Nigel Harman	392	12.7	1.0
Majority		244	7.9	
Total valid votes		3066		
Rejected ballots		12	0.4	
Turnout		3078	44.80	4.6
Conservative gain from Labour		Swing		

=== Maiden Erlegh & Whitegates ===
Maiden Erlegh & Whitegates Election - Results by Party in 2026
1. Liberal Democrats (UK) (37.0%)
2. Conservative Party (UK) (26.5%)
3. Labour Party (UK) (10.5%)
4. Green Party of England and Wales (12.6%)
5. Reform UK (13.0%)

The Maiden Erlegh & Whitegates ward was formed in 2024 from most of the former Maiden Erlegh ward and part of the former Bulmershe & Whitegates ward.

The comparison data here was taken from the June 2025 by-election, caused by the death of the former Conservative councillor, Norman Jorgensen.

Andy Ng Siu-Hong was one of three incumbent Liberal Democrat councillors, and had previously been a councillor in Hong Kong.

Maiden Erlegh & Whitegates
Party	Candidate	Votes	%	±%
Liberal Democrats	Andy Ng Siu-Hong*	1,491	37.0	5.8
Conservative	Wazir Hussain	1067	26.5	2.6
Reform	Lillie Harris	523	13.0	−1.7
Green	Samuel Langlois	509	12.6	12.1
Labour	Mary Morris	425	10.5	−13.5
Majority		424	13.5	
Total valid votes		4015		
Rejected ballots		11	0.3	
Turnout		4026	48.74	8.79
Liberal Democrats hold		Swing		

=== Norreys ===
Norreys Election - Results by Party in 2026
1. Liberal Democrats (UK) (17.9%)
2. Conservative Party (UK) (25.2%)
3. Labour Party (UK) (28.3%)
4. Green Party of England and Wales (7.20%)
5. Reform UK (20.6%)
6. TUSC (0.60%)

Norreys ward is the only ward in the Wokingham parliamentary constituency to include sitting Labour councillors. Nagi Nagella is an incumbent Labour councillor who retained his seat in this election.

Norreys
Party	Candidate	Votes	%	±%
Labour	Nagi Nagella*	896	28.3	−18.1
Conservative	Phil Cunnington	798	25.2	−8.5
Reform	John Halsall	655	20.6	20.6
Liberal Democrats	Alwyn Jones	568	17.9	−0.7
Green	Kalveer Lehal	228	7.2	7.2
TUSC	Sarah Gillman	20	0.6	−2
Majority		98	3.0	
Total valid votes		3165		
Rejected ballots		8	0.2	
Turnout		3173	45.56	5.6
Labour hold		Swing		

=== Shinfield ===
Shinfield Election - Results by Party in 2026
1. Liberal Democrats (UK) (9.90%)
2. Conservative Party (UK) (32.9%)
3. Labour Party (UK) (11.9%)
4. Green Party of England and Wales (8.90%)
5. Reform UK (17.8%)
6. Edward Shaw (19.6%)

The data comparison for the Shinfield ward is from the Shinfield by-election held in December 2024. Vishal Srinivasan was the incumbent Conservative councillor who held this seat. This ward was unusual for having an independent candidate in Edward Shaw.

Shinfield
Party	Candidate	Votes	%	±%
Conservative	Vishal Srinivasan*	854	32.9	−16.1
Independent	Edward Shaw	530	19.6	19.6
Reform	Parry Batth	480	17.8	17.8
Labour	Richard McKenzie	321	11.9	−12.9
Liberal Democrats	Dominic Rider	268	9.9	−11.6
Green	Kieron Titus	241	8.9	4.2
Majority		324	12.0	
Total valid votes		2694		
Rejected ballots		7	0.2	
Turnout		2701	36.98	−3.62
Conservative hold		Swing		

=== South Lake ===
South Lake Election - Results by Party in 2026
1. Liberal Democrats (UK) (32.3%)
2. Conservative Party (UK) (22.8%)
3. Labour Party (UK) (6.60%)
4. Green Party of England and Wales (17.0%)
5. Reform UK (21.2%)

The reorganisation of 2024 saw South Lake increase in size to include parts of the former wards of Bulmershe & Whitegates (including Woodley town centre) and Loddon ward. South Lake kept the same name but the number of members increased from two to three. The 2026 election was won by one of the two Liberal Democrat incumbents, Carol Jewel, the current Mayor of Wokingham Borough Council.

South Lake
Party	Candidate	Votes	%	±%
Liberal Democrats	Carol Jewell*	1,174	32.3	−6.9
Conservative	Michael Kennedy	826	22.8	−17.4
Reform	Andy Harris	770	21.2	21.2
Green	Gary Shacklady	614	17.0	17,0
Labour	Willam Gale	238	6.6	−13.6
Majority		348	9.6	
Total valid votes		3622		
Rejected ballots		4	0.1	
Turnout		3626	48.57	9.9
Liberal Democrats hold		Swing		

=== Spencers Wood & Swallowfield ===
Spencers Wood & Swallowfield Election - Results by Party in 2026
1. Liberal Democrats (UK) (30.9%)
2. Conservative Party (UK) (30.3%)
3. Labour Party (UK) (3.60%)
4. Green Party of England and Wales (8.90%)
5. Reform UK (24.3%)
6. TUSC (1.60%)

In 2024 the Spencers Wood and Swallowfield ward was created from the former Swallowfield ward and part of the former Shinfield South ward to make a single three member ward. Catherine Glover and Chris Johnson were incumbent councillors for Shinfield South, whilst Stuart Munro was the incumbent councillor for Swallowfield. Catherine Glover, Dave Edmonds and Stuart Munro were returned in 2024; Stuart Munro retired as a councillor in 2026.

Anthony Pollock, who stood as the Conservative candidate in 2026, was a former Conservative councillor for Shinfield South.

Spencers Wood & Swallowfield
Party	Candidate	Votes	%	±%
Liberal Democrats	Chris Johnson	1,072	30.9	−9.2
Conservative	Anthony Pollock	1052	30.3	−12.9
Reform	Gerry Allan	844	24.3	24.3
Green	Tom Blomley	307	8.9	−6.4
Labour	Jacky Steele	125	3.6	−6.2
TUSC	Kathryn Allman	55	1.6	1.6
Majority		20	0.6	
Total valid votes		3455		
Rejected ballots		7	0.2	
Turnout		3462	43.68	8.3
Liberal Democrats gain from Conservative		Swing		

=== Thames ===
Thames Election - Results by Party in 2026
1. Liberal Democrats (UK) (40.0%)
2. Conservative Party (UK) (40.5%)
3. Labour Party (UK) (1.80%)
4. Green Party of England and Wales (5.30%)
5. Reform UK (12.2%)

Thames ward comprised the parishes of Charvil, Sonning, Remenham and Wargrave. Charvil and Sonning, which were previously single-member wards prior to 2024, although the Sonning ward did not strictly follow the parish boundary and included a small part of North Woodley. Remenham and Wargrave had previously been part of the two-member ward of Remenham, Wargrave & Ruscombe. Ruscombe is now part of the new Twyford, Ruscombe & Hurst ward.[6]

Katrin Harding was the only incumbent Liberal Democrat councillor for Thames ward, but lost her seat in this election to Leon Cook, the Conservative candidate.

Thames
Party	Candidate	Votes	%	±%
Conservative	Leon Cook	1,550	40.5	−5.9
Liberal Democrats	Katrin Harding*	1532	40.0	−0.8
Reform	Andrew Mclaren	467	12.2	12.2
Green	Salma Baker	201	5.3	5.3
Labour	Stuart Crainer	70	1.8	−10.8
Majority		18	0.47	
Total valid votes		3820	99.74	
Rejected ballots		10	0.26	
Turnout		3830	53.80	12.3
Conservative gain from Liberal Democrats		Swing		

=== Twyford Ruscombe & Hurst ===
Twyford, Ruscombe & Hurst Election - Results by Party in 2026
1. Liberal Democrats (UK) (59.0%)
2. Conservative Party (UK) (15.0%)
3. Labour Party (UK) (1.90%)
4. Green Party of England and Wales (7.70%)
5. Reform UK (16.1%)

Twyford, Ruscombe & Hurst was created in 2024 from the parishes of Hurst, Ruscombe and Twyford.

Graham Howe is a former Conservative councillor for the former Remenham, Wargrave and Ruscombe ward. Martijn Andrea is an incumbent Liberal Democrat councillor who retained this seat.

Twyford Ruscombe & Hust
Party	Candidate	Votes	%	±%
Liberal Democrats	Martijn Andrea*	2,535	59.0	−13.6
Reform	Darren Grant	694	16.1	16.1
Conservative	Graham Howe	643	15.0	−4.8
Green	Merv Boniface	330	7.7	−5.7
Labour	Stuart Hooper	82	1.9	−4.8
Majority		1841	42.9	
Total valid votes		4284		
Rejected ballots		7	0.2	
Turnout		4291	53.80	10.7
Liberal Democrats hold		Swing		

=== Wescott ===
Wescott Election - Results by Party in 2026
1. Liberal Democrats (UK) (40.0%)
2. Conservative Party (UK) (27.3%)
3. Labour Party (UK) (4.30%)
4. Green Party of England and Wales (11.4%)
5. Reform UK (16.9%)

Wescott gained part of the Norreys ward in 2024 as a result of the boundary review. Wescott ward was previously a two-member ward, but is now a three-member ward.

Chris Cook was an incumbent Liberal Democrat councillor for this ward who retained his seat.

Wescott
Party	Candidate	Votes	%	±%
Liberal Democrats	Chris Cooke*	1,398	40.0	−3.8
Conservative	Stephen Clubley	953	27.3	−5.6
Reform	James Pigott	590	16.9	16.9
Green	Dave Chapman	398	11.4	11.4
Labour	Tom Mayers	150	4.3	−13.5
Majority		445	12.7	
Total valid votes		3489		
Rejected ballots		16	0.5	
Turnout		3505	45.67	8.27
Liberal Democrats hold		Swing		

=== Winnersh ===
Winnersh Election - Results by Party in 2026
1. Liberal Democrats (UK) (44.8%)
2. Conservative Party (UK) (22.3%)
3. Labour Party (UK) (2.80%)
4. Green Party of England and Wales (9.40%)
5. Reform UK (20.7%)

Data for the Winnersh ward is being compared with the February 2025 by-election, which was a result of the death of Liberal Democrat councillor, Paul Fishwick.

Chetna Jamthe won the by-election for the Liberal Democrats and retained her seat in this election.

Winnersh
Party	Candidate	Votes	%	±%
Liberal Democrats	Chetna Jamthe*	1,464	44.8	−8.2
Conservative	Martyn Washbourne	729	22.3	−14.7
Reform	Jim Fife	677	20.7	20.7
Green	Laura Titchiner	309	9.4	5.4
Labour	Tim Jinkerson	91	2.8	3.2
Majority		765	23.4	
Total valid votes		3270		
Rejected ballots		0	0	
Turnout		3270	40.68	11.98
Liberal Democrats hold		Swing		

=== Wokingham Without ===
Wiokingham Without Election - Results by Party in 2026
1. Liberal Democrats (UK) (36.4%)
2. Conservative Party (UK) (36.0%)
3. Labour Party (UK) (2.00%)
4. Green Party of England and Wales (5.70%)
5. Reform UK (19.8%)

Wokingham Without had to elect two councillors at the 2026 election. This was due to the resignation of Liberal Democrat Jordan Montgomery, who had been suffering ill-health. Conservative councillor Seona Turtle was also up for election this year.

David Davies had previously been a previous Conservative councillor for Wokingham Without ward.

The election returned Seona Turtle (Conservative) and Roberta Brooks (Liberal Democrat), which means there is no change in the political representation of this ward.

Wokingham Without (2 seats due to by-election)
Party	Candidate	Votes	%	±%
Conservative	Seona Turtle*	1,197	37.5	−6.3
Liberal Democrats	Roberta Brooks	1,160	36.3	−12.5
Liberal Democrats	Jerry Percy	1108	34.7	−14.1
Conservative	David Davies	1049	32.9	−11.1
Reform	Colin Wright	631	19.8	19.8
Reform	Carl Bond	603	18.9	18.9
Green	Henry Newbury	177	5.5	5.5
Green	Guy Zilberman	176	5.5	5.5
Labour	Tom Clark	72	2.3	−4.4
Labour	Colin Heath	55	1.7	−4.0
Majority		37	1.2	
Total valid votes		6228		
Rejected ballots		7	0.2	
Turnout		3193	49.95	9.64
Conservative hold		Swing		
Liberal Democrats hold		Swing		

== Council Membership by party after each election 2010–2026 ==
Election results 2010–2026
Party	2010	2011	2012	2014	2015	2016	2018	2019	2021	2022	2023	2024	2025	2026
Conservative	43	45	43	44	47	47	42	31	31	26	22	19	19	19
Labour	0	0	0	1	1	1	3	4	3	3	5	8	6	5
Liberal Democrats	11	9	10	7	5	5	8	16	18	23	26	27	28	29
Other parties	0	0	1	2	1	1	1	3	2	2	1	0	1	1
Total Seats	54	54	54	54	54	54	54	54	54	54	54	54	54	54
