= 2021 Wokingham Borough Council election =

2021 UK local government election

- 6 May 2021

18 seats, one-third of all council seats.
	Con	LD	Lab
Leader	John Halsall	Lindsay Ferris	Rachel Burgess
Party	Conservative	Liberal Democrats	Labour
Leader since	6 May 2019	2016
Leader's seat	Remenham, Wargrave and Ruscombe	Twyford	Norreys
Last election	31 seats, 57.4%	18 seats, 33.3%	3 seats, 5.6%
Seats needed	▼4	▲9	▲24
	Ind	Grn	WEP
Leader	N/A		Louise Tomlin
Party	Independent	Green	Women's Equality
Leader since	N/A
Leader's seat	N/A		Running in Evendons
Last election	2 seats, 3.3%	0 seats, 0.6%	0
Seats needed	▲25	▲27	▲27
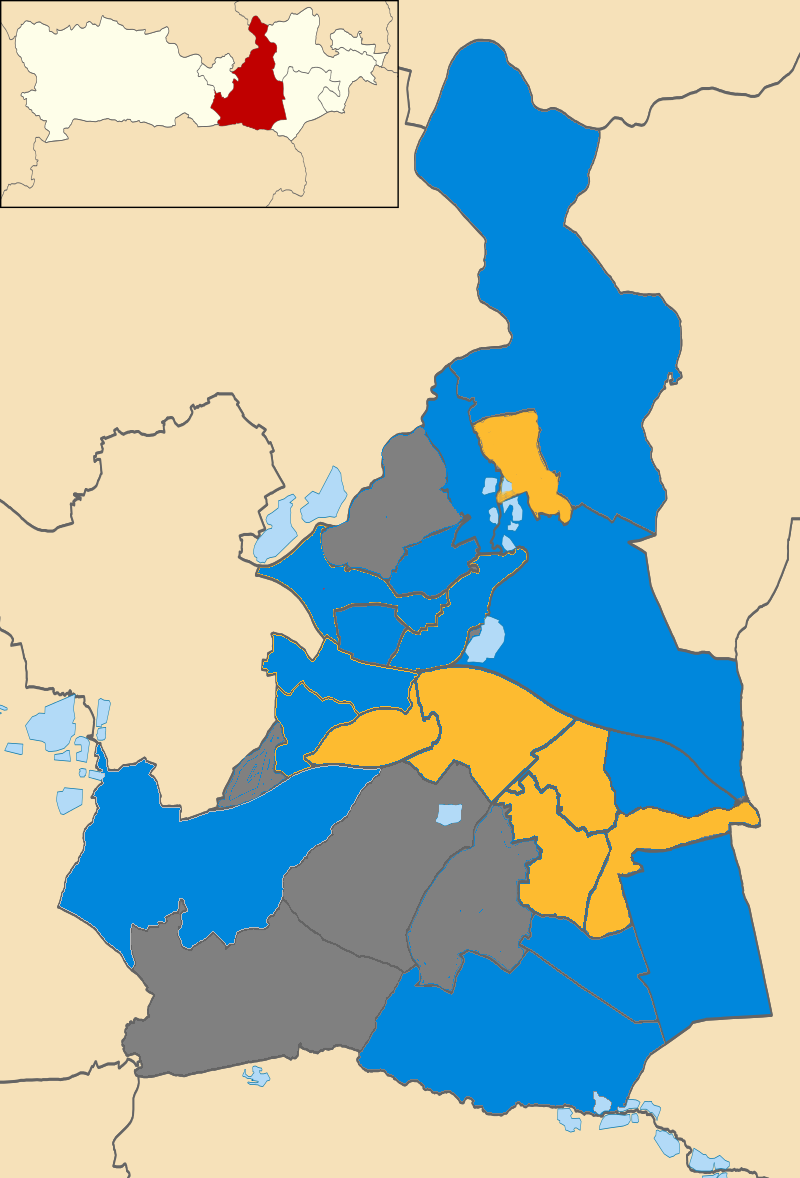
- Ward results map for Wokingham Borough Council
Incumbent Leader of the Council
John Halsall
Conservative

The 2021 Wokingham Borough Council election took place on 6 May 2021 to elect members of Wokingham Borough Council in England. This was on the same day as other local elections and had been postponed from May 2020, due to the COVID-19 pandemic.

The composition of the council before the election was as follows:

↓
31	15	4	3
CON	LD	LAB	IND

There was one vacancy.

After the election, the composition of the council became:

↓
31	18	3	2
CON	LD	LAB	IND

== Election result ==
The Conservatives retained control of the council and gained one seat from Labour. They regained a seat from an independent who had originally been elected as a Conservative, and also regained a vacant seat, which had been won by a Conservative in 2016, who joined the Liberal Democrats in 2017, and had resigned from the Council in 2020. The Liberal Democrats gained three seats from the Conservatives.

== Total Election result ==
2021 Wokingham Borough Council election
Party	This election				Full council			This election		
Party	Candidates	Seats	Net	Seats %	Other	Total	Total %	Votes	Votes %	+/−
Conservative	{{{candidates}}}	12	▼2	66.7	19	31	57.4	21,540	46.4	▲9.1
Liberal Democrats	{{{candidates}}}	6	▲3	33.3	12	18	33.3	16,492	35.5	▼3.9
Labour	{{{candidates}}}	0	▼1	0.0	3	3	5.6	7,439	16.0	▼0.4
Independent	{{{candidates}}}	0	Steady	0.0	2	2	3.7	0	0.0	▼5.4
Green	{{{candidates}}}	0	Steady	0.0	0	0	0.0	695	1.5	▲0.9
Women's Equality	{{{candidates}}}	0	Steady	0.0	0	0	0.0	175	0.4	▲0.1
Freedom Alliance	{{{candidates}}}	0	Steady	0.0	0	0	0.0	114	0.2	New

A total of 46,771 votes were cast for 62 candidates. (46,445 unspoilt)

== Ward results ==
Bulmershe and Whitegates
Party	Candidate	Votes	%	±%
Conservative	Shahid Younis (E)	1,489	43.5	5.6
Labour	Andy Croy	1443	42.2	−0.2
Liberal Democrats	Shiela Jordan	256	7.4	−12.3
Green	Samuel Langlois	186	5.4	5.4
Freedom Alliance	Fiona Morley	23	0.6	0.6
Majority		46	1.3	−3.2
Turnout		3419	48%	6%
Conservative gain from Labour		Swing		

22 ballot papers were rejected

Charvil Ward
Party	Candidate	Votes	%	±%
Conservative	Sam Akhtar (E)	728	58.7	11.7
Liberal Democrats	Martin Alder	367	29.5	29.5
Labour	Brian Scott	81	6.5	−0.4
Green	Kathy Smith	55	4.4	4.4
Majority		361	29.1	28.0
Turnout		1240	52%	7%
Conservative hold		Swing		

9 ballot papers were rejected

Emmbrook
Party	Candidate	Votes	%	±%
Liberal Democrats	Morag Malvern	1,675	48.2	−13.4
Conservative	Ullakarin Clark	1,454	41.8	10.7
Labour	Llewelyn Reed-Jones	320	9.2	−1.6
Majority		221	6.4	−24.1
Turnout		3475	47%	3%
Liberal Democrats gain from Conservative		Swing		

26 ballot papers were rejected

Evendons
Party	Candidate	Votes	%	±%
Liberal Democrats	Ian Shenton (E)	1,390	44.0	−4.5
Conservative	Daniel Hinton	1277	40.4	15.6
Labour	Annette Medhurst	299	9.5	3.8
Women's Equality	Louise Timlin	175	5.5	−0.5
Majority		113	3.6	−20.1
Turnout		3158	44%	7%
Liberal Democrats gain from Conservative		Swing		

17 ballot papers were rejected

Finchampstead North
Party	Candidate	Votes	%	±%
Conservative	Charles Margetts	1,341	69.0	11.9
Liberal Democrats	Jordon Montgomery	283	14.7	−17.4
Labour	Alex Freeney	170	8.7	3.6
Green	Martyn Foss	130	6.7	1.6
Majority		1058	54.5	29.5
Turnout		1941	45%	1%
Conservative hold		Swing		

17 ballot papers were rejected

Finchampstead South
Party	Candidate	Votes	%	±%
Conservative	Rebecca Margetts	1,188	65.0	9.5
Liberal Democrats	Mike Eytle	454	24.8	−8.2
Labour	Grace Tapping	172	9.2	−1.8
Majority		734	40.1	17.6
Turnout		1827	39%	−1%
Conservative hold		Swing		

13 ballot papers were rejected

Hawkedon
Party	Candidate	Votes	%	±%
Liberal Democrats	Clive Jones	1,411	53.6	−2.8
Conservative	Eileen Kessel	869	33.0	1.2
Labour	Mark Craske	339	12.8	1.0
Majority		542	20.5	−4.1
Turnout		2632	38%	2%
Liberal Democrats hold		Swing		

13 ballot papers were rejected

Hillside
Party	Candidate	Votes	%	±%
Conservative	Pauline Jorgensen	1,472	46.8	9.2
Liberal Democrats	Wes Budd	1354	43.0	−8.2
Labour	Hari Sarasan	303	9.6	−1.5
Majority		118	3.6	−10.0
Turnout		3144	49%	5%
Conservative hold		Swing		

15 ballot papers were rejected

Hurst
Party	Candidate	Votes	%	±%
Conservative	Wayne Smith	749	70.4	−5.8
Liberal Democrats	Sam Turvey	211	19.8	6.7
Labour	Paula Monte	100	9.4	−1.3
Majority		538	50.6	−12.5
Turnout		1063	50%	14%
Conservative hold		Swing		

3 ballot papers were rejected.

Loddon
Party	Candidate	Votes	%	±%
Conservative	Anne Chadwick	1,377	46.1	1.8
Liberal Democrats	Beth Rowland	741	24.8	−9.6
Labour	Majid Nagra	689	23.0	5.2
Green	James Towell	163	5.4	5.4
Majority		636	21.2	7.7
Turnout		2986	39%	6%
Conservative hold		Swing		

16 ballot papers were rejected

Maiden Erlegh
Party	Candidate	Votes	%	±%
Conservative	Norman Jorgensen	1,235	40.7	6.8
Liberal Democrats	Mike Smith	931	30.7	−6.3
Labour	Andrew Gray	676	22.2	−6.9
Green	Russell Seymour	161	5.3	5.3
Majority		304	10.0	6.9
Turnout		3032	45%	−1%
Conservative hold		Swing		

29 ballot papers were rejected

Norreys
Party	Candidate	Votes	%	±%
Conservative	Phil Cunnington	1,610	46.1	5.6
Labour	Nick Fox	1375	39.4	0.2
Liberal Democrats	Jane Ainslie	481	13.7	−6.6
Majority		235	6.7	5.4
Turnout		3489	42%	5%
Conservative hold		Swing		

23 ballot papers were rejected

Remenham, Wargrave and Ruscombe
Party	Candidate	Votes	%	±%
Conservative	John Halsall	1,137	62.7	−4.8
Liberal Democrats	Andrea Martijn	425	23.4	1.7
Labour	Stuart Crainer	239	13.1	−2.9
Majority		712	39.2	−6.6
Turnout		1813	42%	11%
Conservative hold		Swing		

12 ballot papers were rejected.

Shinfield South
Party	Candidate	Votes	%	±%
Conservative	Jackie Rance	1,423	48.1	17.3
Liberal Democrats	Chris Johnson	1152	39.0	39.0
Labour	Marcus McDowell	359	12.1	2.2
Majority		271	9.17	−9.5
Turnout		2953	35%	1%
Conservative hold		Swing		

19 ballot papers were rejected

Twyford
Party	Candidate	Votes	%	±%
Liberal Democrats	Lindsay Ferris	1,677	70.6	−2.4
Conservative	Grant Woolner	562	23.6	0.9
Labour	Caroline Hill	118	4.9	0.6
Majority		1115	46.9	−3.4
Turnout		2374	54%	6%
Liberal Democrats hold		Swing		

17 ballot papers were rejected

Wescott
Party	Candidate	Votes	%	±%
Liberal Democrats	Peter Dennis	1,052	44.2	9.1
Conservative	Jullian McGhee-Sumner	1011	42.4	8.8
Labour	Colin Heath	288	12.1	−11.3
Majority		41	1.7	0.2
Turnout		2379	43%	1%
Liberal Democrats gain from Conservative		Swing		

28 ballot papers were rejected

Winnersh
Party	Candidate	Votes	%	±%
Liberal Democrats	Rachelle Shepherd-Dubey	1,627	54.1	−10.6
Conservative	Bernadette Mitra	1002	33.3	10.5
Labour	Allan Murungi	258	8.6	3.0
Freedom Alliance	Karen Clyde	91	3.0	3.0
Majority		625	20.8	−21.1
Turnout		3003	38%	4%
Liberal Democrats hold		Swing		

25 ballot papers were rejected

Wokingham Without
Party	Candidate	Votes	%	±%
Conservative	Pauline Helliar-Symmons	1,616	56.8	4.7
Liberal Democrats	Robert Comber	1005	35.3	−4.0
Labour	Brent Lees	210	7.4	−1.3
Majority		611	21.4	8.6
Turnout		2843	44%	7%
Conservative hold		Swing		

12 ballot papers were rejected
