= 2022 Wokingham Borough Council election =

Election of the Council from Thursday 5 May 2022

← 2021	5 May 2022	2023 →

18 out of 54 seats to Wokingham Borough Council 28 seats needed for a majority
	LD	Con
Leader	Clive Jones	John Halsall
Party	Liberal Democrats	Conservative
Leader since	2021	2019
Leader's seat	Hawkedon	Remenham, Wargrave and Ruscombe
Last election	23 seats, 42.5%	26 seats, 48.1%
	Lab	Ind
Leader	Rachel Burgess	N/A
Party	Labour	Independent
Leader since		N/A
Leader's seat	Norreys	N/A
Last election	3 seats, 5.6%	2 seats, 3.3%
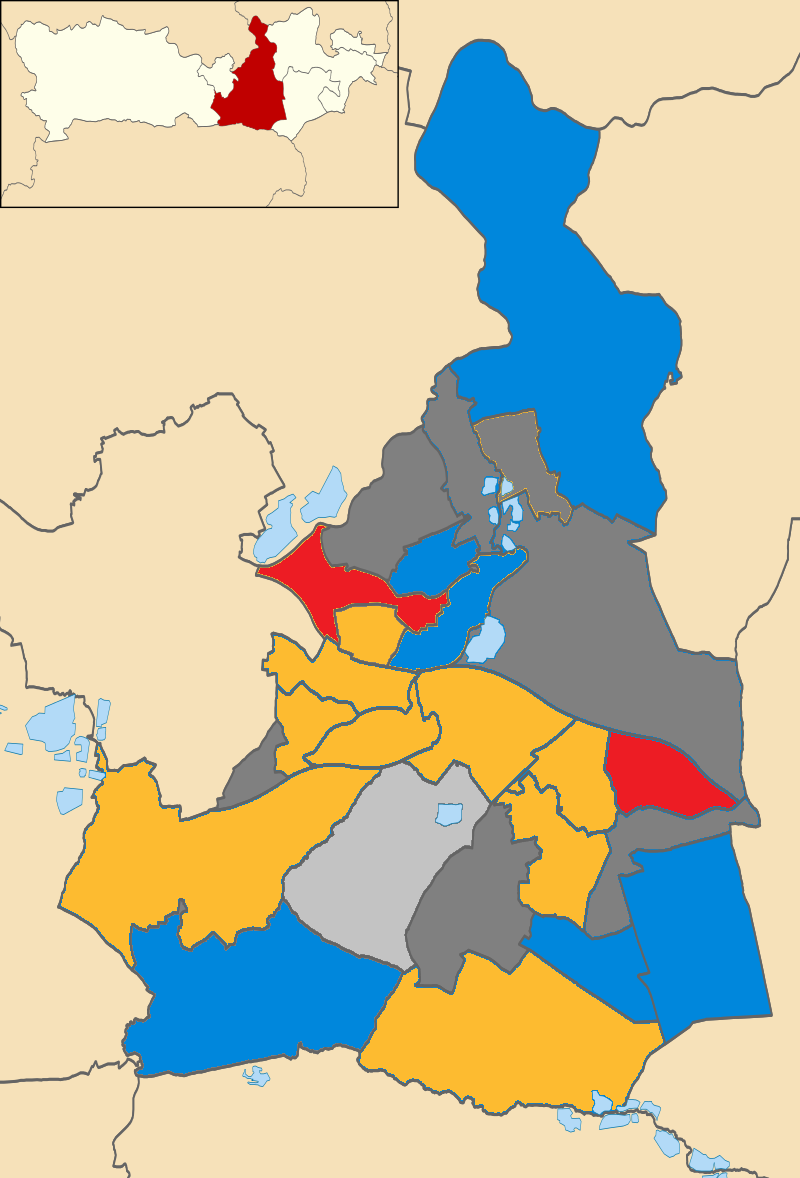
- Ward results map for Wokingham Borough Council

The 2022 Wokingham Borough Council election took place as of Thursday 5 May 2022. That was the same day as other United Kingdom local elections in order to elect members of Wokingham Unitary Council in Berkshire, England. One third of the council, 18 seats, was up for election and the Conservative Party lost control of the council, but was the largest group.

The composition of the council before the election was as follows:

↓
31	18	2	3
CON	LD	LAB	IND

After the election, the composition of the council became:

↓
26	23	3	2
CON	LD	LAB	IND

Wokingham Borough Council is No Overall Control

== Background ==
A total of 64 candidates contested the 18 seats which were up for election. After the election, Wokingham Borough Council became No Overall Control.

After this election, the Wokingham Borough Partnership was formed from the 23 Liberal Democrat Councillors, 3 Labour Councillors and the 2 Independent Councillors. Together, they formed a majority and collectively agreed to work together in the best interests of the residents.

== Election result ==
Results map

These are the results as of 6 May 2022

2022 Wokingham Borough Council election
Party	This election			Full council			This election		
Party	Seats	Net	Seats %	Other	Total	Total %	Votes	Votes %	+/−
Conservative	6	▼5	33.3	20	26	48.1	15,675	36.9	▼9.5
Liberal Democrats	9	▲5	50.0	14	23	42.5	17,401	40.9	▲5.4
Labour	2	▲1	11.0	1	3	5.5	7,620	17.9	▲1.9
Independent	1	▼1	5.5	1	2	3.7	506	1.2	▲1.2
Green	0	Steady	0.0	0	0	0.0	1,317	3.1	▲1.6

There were a total of 42,711 votes cast, including 192 spoiled ballots.

== Ward results ==
Arborfield
Party	Candidate	Votes	%	±%
Independent	Gary Cowan	506	75.0	+8.9
Conservative	Anthony Pollock	104	15.4	−13.0
Labour	Anna Smith	65	9.6	+3.7
Majority		402	59.6	21.9
Total valid votes		675	99.4	
Rejected ballots		4	0.6	
Turnout		679	33.15	−7.8
Independent hold		Swing	10.9	

Bulmershe & Whitegates
Party	Candidate	Votes	%	±%
Labour	Andy Croy	1,531	51.1	+8.6
Conservative	Wazir Hussain	1,062	35.5	−8.3
Liberal Democrats	Sheila Jordan	237	7.9	+0.4
Green	Samuel Langlois	165	5.5	0.0
Majority		469	15.7	14.2
Total valid votes		2,995	99.5	
Rejected ballots		15	0.5	
Turnout		3,010	42.85	−5.15
Labour gain from Independent		Swing	8.4	

Coronation
Party	Candidate	Votes	%	±%
Conservative	Keith Baker	1,078	61.9	+2.0
Liberal Democrats	Paddy Power	302	17.3	−1.1
Labour	Tony Skuse	218	12.5	+6.7
Green	Emma Hamilton	143	8.2	−2.6
Majority		776	44.6	3.0
Total valid votes		1,741	99.3	
Rejected ballots		12	0.7	
Turnout		1,753	41.82	−0.18
Conservative hold		Swing	1.5	

Emmbrook
Party	Candidate	Votes	%	±%
Liberal Democrats	Imogen Shepherd-DuBey	1,902	60.4	+11.9
Conservative	Mark Ashwell	926	29.4	−12.6
Labour	Elanor Crabb	189	6.0	−3.3
Green	Lauren Seymour	133	4.2	N/A
Majority		976	31.0	24.4
Total valid votes		3,150	99.7	
Rejected ballots		11	0.3	
Turnout		3,161	42.56	−4.44
Liberal Democrats hold		Swing	12.2	

Evendons
Party	Candidate	Votes	%	±%
Liberal Democrats	Sarah Kerr	1,900	64.4	+20.2
Conservative	Lawrence Chacksfield	798	27.0	−13.5
Labour	Alex Freeney	163	5.5	−4.0
Green	Hayley Kearey	90	3.0	N/A
Majority		1,102	37.3	33.6
Total valid votes		2,951	99.7	
Rejected ballots		8	0.3	
Turnout		2,959	42.1	−1.9
Liberal Democrats hold		Swing	16.8	

Finchampstead North
Party	Candidate	Votes	%	±%
Conservative	Peter Harper	983	51.5	−17.7
Liberal Democrats	Joseph Boadu	592	31.0	+16.2
Labour	Annette Medhurst	170	8.9	+0.1
Green	Martyn Foss	164	8.6	+1.8
Majority		391	20.5	−34.1
Total valid votes		1,909	99.7	
Rejected ballots		5	0.3	
Turnout		1,914	44.72	−0.28
Conservative hold		Swing	-16.9	

Finchampstead South
Party	Candidate	Votes	%	±%
Liberal Democrats	David Cornish	1,131	56.4	+31.5
Conservative	Bernadette Mitra	774	38.6	−26.5
Labour	Grace Tapping	102	5.1	−4.2
Majority		357	17.8	−22.4
Total valid votes		2,007	99.5	
Rejected ballots		10	0.5	
Turnout		2,017	42.21	3.21
Liberal Democrats gain from Conservative		Swing	29.0	

Hawkedon
Party	Candidate	Votes	%	±%
Liberal Democrats	David Hare	1,476	61.9	+8.1
Conservative	Frank Smith	576	24.2	−9.0
Labour	Mark Craske	332	13.9	−1.0
Majority		900	37.8	17.1
Total valid votes		2,384	99.7	
Rejected ballots		7	0.3	
Turnout		2,391	35.13	−2.87
Liberal Democrats hold		Swing	8.5	

Hillside
Party	Candidate	Votes	%	±%
Liberal Democrats	Alistair Neal	1,591	54.1	+10.7
Conservative	Martyn Washbourne	1,070	36.4	−10.7
Labour	Caroline Hill	282	9.6	−0.1
Majority		521	17.7	14.1
Total valid votes		2,943	99.5	
Rejected ballots		16	0.5	
Turnout		2,959	46.82	
Liberal Democrats gain from Conservative		Swing	10.7	

Loddon
Party	Candidate	Votes	%	±%
Conservative	Bill Soane	969	38.7	−7.8
Labour	Majid Nagra	845	33.7	+10.4
Liberal Democrats	Carol Jewell	691	27.6	+2.5
Majority		124	5.0	−16.2
Total valid votes		2,505	99.2	
Rejected ballots		20	0.8	
Turnout		2,525	33.24	
Conservative hold		Swing	-9.1	

Maiden Erlegh
Party	Candidate	Votes	%	±%
Liberal Democrats	Mike Smith	1,495	50.8	+19.9
Conservative	Andrew Bradley	914	31.1	−9.8
Labour	Andrew Gray	532	18.1	−4.2
Majority		581	19.8	9.8
Total valid votes		2,941	99.6	
Rejected ballots		12	0.4	
Turnout		2,953	44.04	
Liberal Democrats gain from Conservative		Swing	14.8	

Norreys
Party	Candidate	Votes	%	±%
Labour	Rachel Burgess	1,884	53.7	+14.1
Conservative	Daniel Hinton	1,199	34.2	−12.1
Liberal Democrats	Jane Ainslie	312	8.9	−4.9
Green	David Chapman	112	3.2	N/A
Majority		685	19.5	12.8
Total valid votes		3,507	99.7	
Rejected ballots		12	0.3	
Turnout		3,519	42.22	
Labour hold		Swing	13.1	

Remenham, Wargrave and Ruscombe
Party	Candidate	Votes	%	±%
Conservative	Graham Howe	872	50.3	−12.1
Liberal Democrats	Martijn Andrea	450	26.0	+2.4
Labour	Stuart Crainer	237	13.7	+0.5
Green	Merv Boniface	175	10.1	N/A
Majority		422	24.3	
Total valid votes		1,734	99.7	
Rejected ballots		6	0.3	
Turnout		1,740	40.88	−1.12
Conservative hold		Swing	-7.2	

Shinfield South
Party	Candidate	Votes	%	±%
Liberal Democrats	Chris Johnson	1,328	45.2	+5.9
Conservative	Dave Edmonds	1,197	40.8	−7.6
Labour	Marie-Louise Weighill	411	14.0	+1.8
Majority		131	4.5	−4.67
Total valid votes		2,936	99.4	
Rejected ballots		17	0.6	
Turnout		2,953	33.1	
Liberal Democrats gain from Conservative		Swing	6.7	

South Lake
Party	Candidate	Votes	%	±%
Liberal Democrats	Beth Rowland	955	48.3	+6.0
Conservative	Danny Errawalla	807	40.8	−3.7
Labour	David Field	217	11.0	−2.9
Majority		148	7.5	5.3
Total valid votes		1,979	99.5	
Rejected ballots		9	0.5	
Turnout		1,988	46.0	
Liberal Democrats gain from Conservative		Swing	4.8	

Swallowfield
Party	Candidate	Votes	%	±%
Conservative	Stuart Munro	478	51.2	−17.4
Liberal Democrats	Catherine Glover	287	30.8	+14.1
Green	Tom Blomley	103	11.0	N/A
Labour	Paula Monte	65	7.0	
Majority		191	20.5	−31.5
Total valid votes		933	99.6	
Rejected ballots		4	0.4	
Turnout		937	36.49	1.49
Conservative hold		Swing	-15.7	

Winnersh
Party	Candidate	Votes	%	±%
Liberal Democrats	Prue Bray	1,710	63.8	+9.3
Conservative	Kirsty Ross	668	24.9	−8.6
Labour	Llewelyn Reed-Jones	190	7.1	
Green	Steve Lloyd	112	4.2	N/A
Majority		1,042	38.9	
Total valid votes		2,680	99.4	
Rejected ballots		15	0.6	
Turnout		2,695	34.35	−14.17
Liberal Democrats hold		Swing	8.9	

Wokingham Without
Party	Candidate	Votes	%	±%
Conservative	Dave Davies	1,200	47.1	−9.7
Liberal Democrats	Jordan Montgomery	1,042	40.9	+5.6
Labour	Marilyn Groves	187	7.3	−0.1
Green	Danielle Ebbage	120	4.7	N/A
Majority		158	6.2	−15.2
Total valid votes		2,549	99.6	
Rejected ballots		9	0.4	
Turnout		2,558	34.35	
Conservative hold		Swing	-7.6	

== Council Membership by party after each election 2010–2022 ==
Election results 2010–2022
Party	2010	2011	2012	2014	2015	2016	2018	2019	2021	2022
Conservative	43	45	43	44	47	47	42	31	31	26
Liberal Democrats	11	9	10	7	5	5	8	16	18	23
Labour	0	0	0	1	1	1	3	4	3	3
Other parties	0	0	1	2	1	1	1	3	2	2
Total Seats	54	54	54	54	54	54	54	54	54	54
