= The Bulmershe School =

Coordinates: 51.4542°N 0.9169°W

Bulmershe School

Location
- Woodlands Avenue; Woodley, Berkshire, RG5 3EU; England

Information
- Type: Comprehensive Academy
- Motto: Inspiring Potential, Achieving Together
- Religious affiliation: Mixed
- Established: 1964
- Local authority: Wokingham
- Department for Education URN: 110062 Tables
- Ofsted: Reports
- Head teacher: Amanda Woodfin
- Gender: Coeducational
- Age: 11 to 18
- Enrolment: 1,040
- Trust: Corvus Learning Trust
- Website: https://www.thebulmersheschool.com/

The Bulmershe School is a coeducational comprehensive school with academy status located in Woodley, Berkshire.

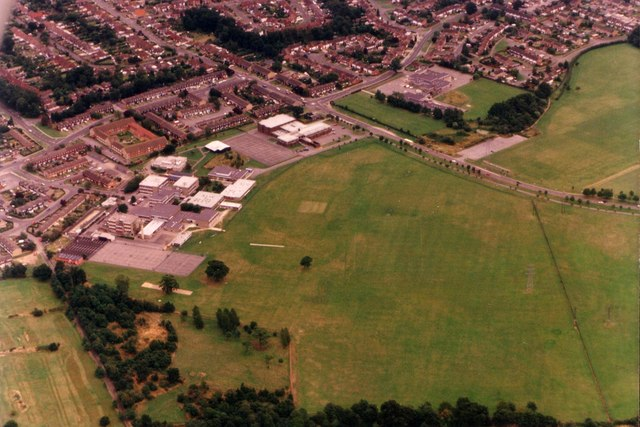
Aerial view of The Bulmershe School from 1986.

== History ==
Building work completed in 2016 on the construction of a new school building housing a 392-seat auditorium, six classrooms with computer workstations and a new sixth form area. The Bulmershe Auditorium includes a 392-seat theatre (equipped with professional audio-visual equipment), a sixth-form centre, meeting rooms, a reception area, and administrative offices.

The Bulmershe School was rated as a good school by the Office for Standards in Education (OFSTED), following an inspection in November 2017.

The head teacher is Amanda Woodfin, who joined the school in January 2013 and became Acting Head Teacher on 1 September 2017.

In 2018 work started on a new sports centre and swimming pool owned by Places Leisure, which replaced the old "Bulmershe Leisure Centre". (Note: The school and leisure centre are independent.)

There were 1,215 students on roll at the time of the 2019 school census. The majority of the students come from Woodley and Earley.

On the 1st February 2024, The Bulmershe School converted to an Academy and became a member of the Corvus Learning Trust.

== Notable alumni ==
- Clive Jones MP for the Wokingham constituency 2024–Present
