= Clive Jones (politician) =

British politician

Clive Jones MP
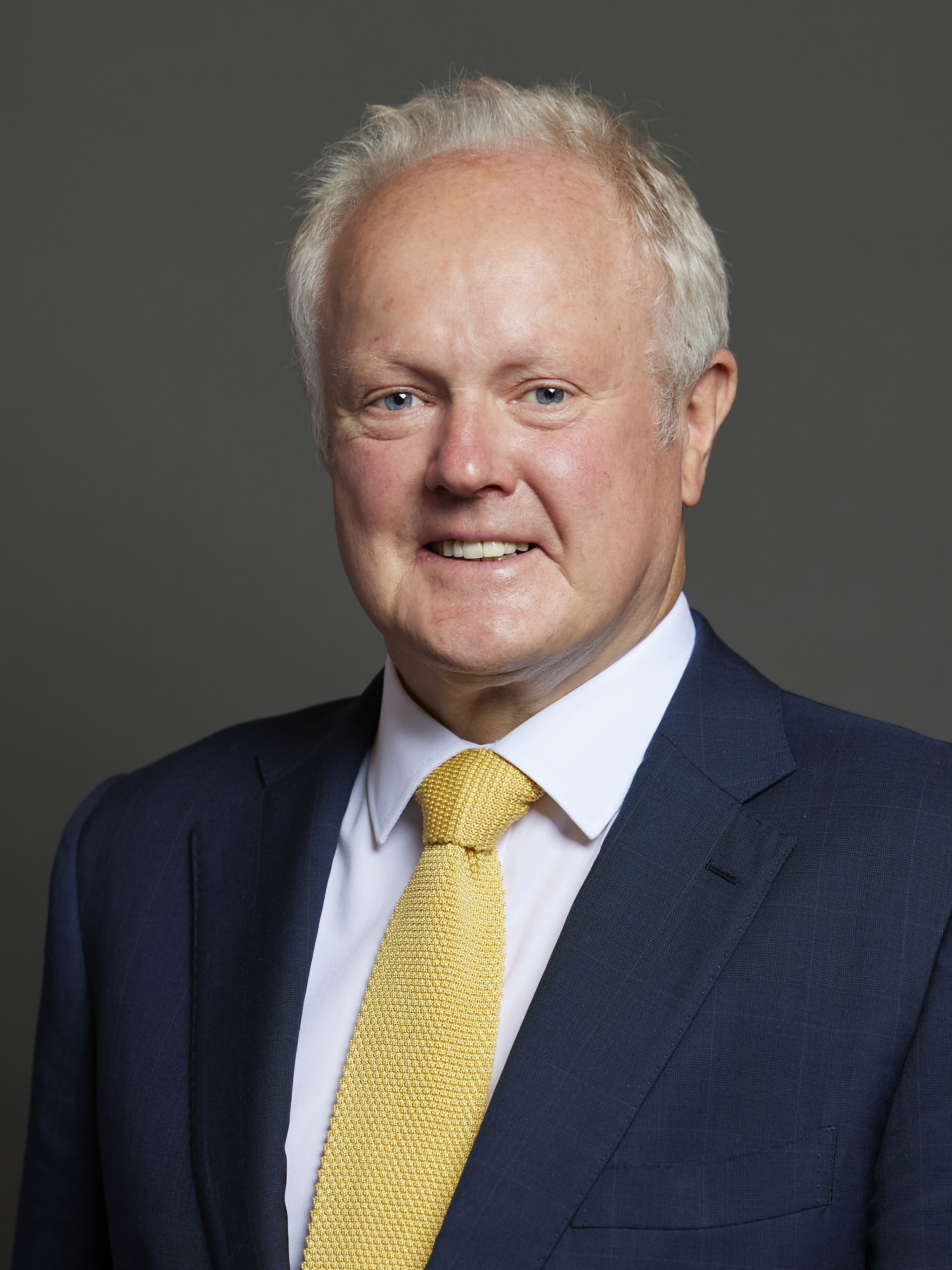
- Official portrait, 2024

Member of Parliament for Wokingham
- Incumbent
- Assumed office 4 July 2024
- Preceded by: John Redwood
- Majority: 8,345 (15.5%)

Liberal Democrat spokesperson on Trade
- In office October 2024 – October 2025
- Leader: Ed Davey
- Preceded by: Sarah Green
- Succeeded by: Joshua Reynolds

Leader of Wokingham Borough Council
- In office 19 May 2022 – 18 May 2023
- Preceded by: John Halsall
- Succeeded by: Stephen Conway

Member of Wokingham Borough Council for Hawkedon
- In office 9 May 2016 – 6 May 2024

Personal details
- Born: Clive Richard Jones Gillingham, Kent, England
- Party: Liberal Democrats
- Children: 2

Clive Richard Jones is a British Liberal Democrat politician who has been Member of Parliament (MP) for Wokingham since 2024. Jones was a member of Wokingham Borough Council from 2016 to 2024 and served as the leader of the council in 2022–2023. Before entering politics, he worked in the toy-manufacturing industry.

== Early life and education ==
Jones was born in Gillingham, Kent. He moved to Earley in Wokingham in 1974 and attended The Bulmershe School in Woodley.

== Business and political career ==
In 1979, Jones became a management trainee at a toy manufacturer. He remained in the company for 27 years, and was its managing director for the last 11 years. Jones has been a director of the British Toy and Hobby Association, serving as chairman from 2004 to 2006 and president from 2011 to 2014.

Jones was elected to Wokingham Borough Council for the ward of Hawkedon in the 2016 council election. He served as leader of the opposition from October 2021 before becoming the leader of the council in May 2022, succeeding John Halsall. Jones stepped down as council leader in May 2023 and was succeeded by Stephen Conway. At the 2024 council election, Jones stood down as a councillor to concentrate on his general-election campaign.

Jones contested the 2015 and 2017 general elections in Wokingham, finishing in third place on both occasions behind the Conservatives and Labour. In the 2024 general election, Jones was elected as MP for Wokingham, achieving a majority of 8,345 votes over the Conservative candidate and becoming the first non-Conservative MP for the constituency.

== Personal life ==
Jones is married with two children.

Parliament of the United Kingdom
Preceded by John Redwood	Member of Parliament for Wokingham; 2024–present	Incumbent
