= Ng Siu-hong =

English politician (born 1979)

Andy Ng
- 吳兆康
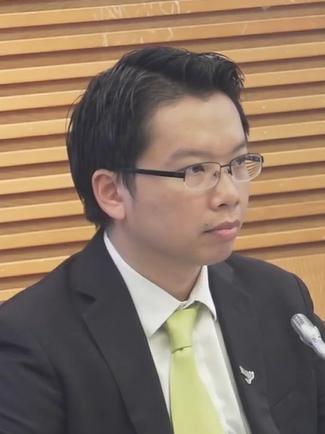
- Ng attending a Central and Western District Council meeting in 2020

Wokingham Borough Councillor of Berkshire, England
- Incumbent
- Assumed office May 2024 Serving with Norman Jorgensen and Stephen Newton
- Preceded by: Constituency created
- Constituency: Maiden Erlegh & Whitegates

Central and Western District Councillor of Hong Kong
- In office 1 January 2016 – 30 April 2021
- Preceded by: Jackie Cheung
- Succeeded by: Constituency abolished
- Constituency: Mid Levels East
- Majority: 1,521 (50.9%)

Personal details
- Born: 1979 (age 46–47) British Hong Kong
- Citizenship: United Kingdom; People's Republic of China (Hong Kong)
- Party: Liberal Democrats (UK) (2023–)
- Other political affiliations: Democratic Party (HK) (?–2021)

Andy Ng Siu-hong (Cantonese: 吳兆康, Cantonese Yale: Ǹgh Shiuh Hōng, born 1979) is a Hong Kong-born English politician. Ng is now a local councillor in Wokingham, England and was a councillor in the Central and Western District Council in Hong Kong.

== Early life ==
Ng attended Raimondi College, on the Mid-Levels in the City of Victoria on Hong Kong Island – which served as the polling station of the constituency he later represented. He was a graphic designer.

== Political career ==
=== Hong Kong ===
Ng, a member of the Democratic Party of Hong Kong, was first elected to the Mid-Levels East constituency in the 2015 local elections after winning 50.9% of votes and defeating Jackie Cheung, a pro-Beijing candidate. He is considered a close ally of Ted Hui, a councillor of the same party for a neighbouring constituency in the district, who was nicknamed the "Central Duo" (中區孖寶) with him. In June 2018 he was attacked by a resident while promoting the annual 1 July march, apparently over his opposition against local liquor licences.

His majority in the constituency was further increased in the 2019 elections, to 57.28% (2,672 votes) with a gain of 6.38%, amidst the large wave of anti-government protests. He resigned on 29 April 2021, effective from May, after the government intended to introduce an oath-taking requirement for local councillors. Ng later revealed that he resigned because he was concerned due to his involvement in the democracy movement.

=== United Kingdom ===
Ng's family migrated to Reading, England in 2021. He joined various local groups to assist overseas Hongkongers, and became a member of the Liberal Democrats in 2023. He was selected to run for the seat of Maiden Erlegh and Whitegates in the Wokingham Borough Council in the 2024 local elections. Ng was elected with 1,162 votes to the three-member ward. Ng is the second from Hong Kong to sit on an English local authority after Ying Perrett who secured a seat at the Bisley & West End ward of Surrey Heath Borough Council in the November 2023 elections, and the first who had held an elected office in Hong Kong. Ng believed voters "have chosen a Hongkonger to represent them in the council because we share similar values", and the victory "has proven that Hongkongers can still win by participating in politics in Britain".

== Electoral performances ==
=== Borough of Wokingham, England ===
Maiden Erlegh & Whitegates, 2026
Party	Candidate	Votes	%	±%
Liberal Democrats	Andy Ng Siu-Hong*	1,491	37.0	5.8
Conservative	Wazir Hussain	1067	26.5	2.6
Reform	Lillie Harris	523	13.0	−1.7
Green	Samuel Langlois	509	12.6	12.1
Labour	Mary Morris	425	10.5	−13.5
Majority		424	13.5	
Total valid votes		4015		
Rejected ballots		11	0.3	
Turnout		4026	48.74	8.79
Liberal Democrats hold		Swing		

Maiden Erlegh & Whitegates, 2024
Party	Candidate	Votes	%	±%
Conservative	Norman Jorgensen*	1,187	11.3	N/A
Liberal Democrats	Stephen Newton*	1,182	11.3	N/A
Liberal Democrats	Andy Siu-Hong Ng	1,162	11.1	N/A
Liberal Democrats	Mike Smith*	1,133	10.8	N/A
Conservative	Wazir Hussain	1,110	10.6	N/A
Labour	Richard McKenzie	1,026	9.9	N/A
Labour	Vikram Duhan	959	9.1	N/A
Conservative	Ranga Madhu	956	9.1	N/A
Labour	Tony Skuse*	898	8.6	N/A
Green	Samuel Langlois	493	4.7	N/A
Independent	Ibrahim Mohammed	336	3.2	N/A
Majority		29		
Total valid votes		10463		
Rejected ballots		21		
Turnout		3,752	46.07%	

=== Central and Western District, Hong Kong ===
Central & Western District Council Election, 2019: Mid Levels East
Party	Candidate	Votes	%	±%
Democratic	Ng Siu-hong	2,672	57.28	+6.38
DAB	Samuel Mok Kam-sum	1,993	42.72	
Majority		679	14.56	
Turnout		4,685	69.84	
Democratic hold		Swing		

Central & Western District Council Election, 2015: Mid Levels East
Party	Candidate	Votes	%	±%
Democratic	Ng Siu-hong	1,521	50.9	+3.3
Independent	Jackie Cheung Yick-hung	1,466	49.1	–8.9
Majority		55	1.8	–17.6
Turnout		3,013	45.5	
Democratic gain from Independent		Swing	+6.1	

== Personal life ==
Ng is married with two children. The family is Catholic.
