= 2024 Wokingham Borough Council election =

Election of the council from Thursday 2 May 2024

- 2 May 2024

54 out of 54 seats to Wokingham Borough Council 28 seats needed for a majority

	First party	Second party
Leader	Stephen Conway	Pauline Jorgensen
Party	Liberal Democrats	Conservative
Last election	26 seats, 41.3%	22 seats, 36.6%
Seats before	26	22
Seats after	27	19
Seat change	▲1	▼3
Popular vote	61,794	56,938
Percentage	41.2%	37.9%
Swing	▼0.1%	▲1.3%
	Third party	Fourth party
Leader	Andy Croy
Party	Labour	Independent
Last election	5 seats, 16.3%	1 seat, 1.7%
Seats before	5	1
Seats after	8	0
Seat change	▲3	▼1
Popular vote	27,173	336
Percentage	18.1%	0.2%
Swing	▲1.8%	▼1.5%
- Winner of each seat at the 2024 Wokingham Borough Council election
Leader before election
Stephen Conway
Liberal Democrat
No overall control
Leader after election
Stephen Conway
Liberal Democrat
No overall control

The 2024 Wokingham Borough Council election took place on Thursday 2 May 2024, to elect members of Wokingham Borough Council in Berkshire, England. This was on the same day as other local elections across England. Due to boundary changes all seats were up for election. The main impact of the boundary changes is that all wards in the Borough are now three member wards; the number of seats remained the same at 54. The old warding system had a mix of one, two and three member wards.

Prior to the election, the council was under no overall control. The Liberal Democrats were the largest party and had been so since the 2022 election. At the 2024 election, the council remained under no overall control. The Liberal Democrats made a net gain of one seat, giving them exactly half the seats on the council, leaving them one seat short of a majority.

The composition of the council before the election was as follows:

↓
26	5	1	22
LD	LAB	IND	CON

After the election, the composition of the council became:

↓
27	8	19
LD	LAB	CON

After the 'all-up' elections in 2024, the Borough will continue to elect councilors by thirds, with one member in every ward being elected every year. 2025 will be a 'fallow year', i.e. a year with no elections with the next elections being in 2026, 2027 and 2028 and the next fallow year in 2029.

== Election Summary ==
2024 Wokingham Borough Council election
Party	Candidates	Seats	Gains	Losses	Net gain/loss	Seats %	Votes %	Votes	+/−
Liberal Democrats	54	27	1	0	▲1	50.0	41.2	61,794	–0.1
Conservative	54	19	0	3	▼3	35.2	37.9	56,938	+1.3
Labour	54	8	3	0	▲3	14.8	18.1	27,173	+1.8
Green	8	0	0	0	0	0.0	2.3	3,383	–0.6
Independent	1	0	0	1	▼1	0.0	0.2	336	–1.5
TUSC	2	0	0	0	0	0.0	0.1	152	+0.1

There were a total of 150,073 votes cast with a total of 297 spoiled ballots.

== Ward results ==
Sitting councilors are marked with an asterisk (*).

=== Barkham & Arborfield ===
Barkham and Arborfied Election - Results by Party in 2024
1. Liberal Democrats (UK) (43.3%)
2. Conservative Party (UK) (41.4%)
3. Labour Party (UK) (10.4%)
4. Green Party of England and Wales (4.80%)

Barkham & Arborfield was formed from the former single-member wards of Barkham and Arborfield, plus the West of Finchampstead South centred on Arborfield Green, and a very small part of the old Swallowfield ward.

It was the only ward with no incumbent councillors standing. Both Barkham's Ian Pittock (Liberal Democrat) and Arborfield's Gary Cowan (Independent) stood down, and both Finchampstead South councillors, David Cornish (Liberal Democrat) and Rebecca Margetts (Conservative) contested the new Finchampstead ward. Annette Medhurst was the Labour candidate for Wokingham in the 2019 General Election, finishing third with 10.4% of the vote.

Barkham & Arborfield
Party	Candidate	Votes	%	±%
Liberal Democrats	Adrian Betteridge	1,018	42.7	
Conservative	Joseph Barley	982	41.2	
Conservative	George Evans	973	40.8	
Liberal Democrats	Joseph Boadu	964	40.5	
Liberal Democrats	Heather Richards	940	39.4	
Conservative	Sebastian Graabek	840	35.2	
Green	Asad Feroz	322	13.5	
Labour	Jane Francis	257	10.8	
Labour	Annette Medhurst	242	10.2	
Labour	Tim Jinkerson	202	8.5	
Rejected ballots		7		
Turnout		2,390	32.2	
Liberal Democrats win (new seat)				
Conservative win (new seat)				
Conservative win (new seat)				

=== Bulmershe & Coronation ===
Bulmershe & Coronation Election Results by Party in 2024
1. Liberal Democrats (UK) (21.3%)
2. Conservative Party (UK) (50.1%)
3. Labour Party (UK) (21.2%)
4. Green Party of England and Wales (6.90%)

Bulmershe & Coronation contains almost all of the former Coronation ward, the part of the former Sonning ward which was in the parish of Woodley, and much of the Bulmershe part of the three-member Bulmershe and Whitegates ward.

Alison Swaddle was one the two incumbent councillors for Coronation, whilst Shahid Younis was an incumbent councillor for the abolished Bulmershe & Whitegates ward. Younis' fellow Bulmershe & Whitegates councillor Tony Skuse (Labour) contested Maiden Erlegh & Whitegates which contains the other half of their former ward, whilst the other incumbent councillor Andy Croy (Labour) contested Wescott in Wokingham Town.

Bulmershe & Coronation
Party	Candidate	Votes	%	±%
Conservative	Alison Swaddle*	1,468	51.8	
Conservative	Shahid Younis*	1,318	46.5	
Conservative	Yusra Salman	1,173	41.4	
Liberal Democrats	Paul Barton	632	22.3	
Labour	Charlotte Mcfarlane	591	20.9	
Liberal Democrats	Steve Nash	584	20.6	
Labour	Will Evans	576	20.3	
Green	Gary Shacklady	542	19.1	
Labour	David Sharp	510	18.0	
Liberal Democrats	Sheila Jordan	467	16.5	
Rejected ballots		18		
Turnout		2,850	40.2	
Conservative win (new seat)				
Conservative win (new seat)				
Conservative win (new seat)				

=== Emmbrook ===
Emmbrook Election Results by Party in 2024
1. Liberal Democrats (UK) (55.0%)
2. Conservative Party (UK) (30.5%)
3. Labour Party (UK) (10.2%)
4. Green Party of England and Wales (4.00%)

Emmbrook was not affected by the boundary changes. Rachel Bishop-Firth and Imogen Shepherd-DuBey were both incumbents for Emmbrook. David Lee was a former councillor for Norreys and was Leader of the council for six years before stepping down in 2014. Kate Haines was a former Conservative Councillor for Coronation Ward in 2015, but did not stand again in 2019.

Emmbrook
Party	Candidate	Votes	%	±%
Liberal Democrats	Rachel Bishop-Firth*	1,760	54.7	N/A
Liberal Democrats	Imogen Shepherd-DuBey*	1,736	54.0	N/A
Liberal Democrats	Basit Alvi	1,562	48.6	N/A
Conservative	David Lee	1,069	33.2	N/A
Conservative	Kate Haines	918	28.5	N/A
Conservative	John McDermott	813	25.3	N/A
Green	Lauren Seymour	369	11.5	N/A
Labour	Barrie Callender	356	11.1	N/A
Labour	Marilyn Groves	293	9.1	N/A
Labour	John Ferguson	291	9.0	N/A
Rejected ballots		22		
Turnout		3,238	40.65	−2.04
Liberal Democrats hold				
Liberal Democrats hold				
Liberal Democrats hold				

=== Evendons ===
Evendons Election Results by Party in 2024
1. Liberal Democrats (UK) (57.5%)
2. Conservative Party (UK) (31.0%)
3. Labour Party (UK) (9.80%)

Evendons was not affected by the boundary changes. Incumbent councillors Sarah Kerr and Ian Shenton, both Liberal Democrats, are standing down. Mark Ashwell was a former Conservative Councillor for Evendons ward, but is now standing for the Liberal Democrats Louise Timlin has also previously stood for the Women's Equality Party and is now standing for the Liberal Democrats

Evendons
Party	Candidate	Votes	%	±%
Liberal Democrats	Mark Ashwell	1,668	57.4	
Liberal Democrats	Louise Timlin	1,580	54.4	
Liberal Democrats	Adrian Mather*	1,552	53.4	
Conservative	Jasmine Waters	876	30.2	
Conservative	Jeff Cant	873	30.1	
Conservative	Martin Jeater	839	28.9	
Labour	Alwyn Jones	324	11.2	
Labour	Mary Morris	306	10.5	
Labour	Colin Heath	284	9.8	
Rejected ballots		22		
Turnout		2,927	42.2	
Liberal Democrats hold				
Liberal Democrats hold				
Liberal Democrats hold				

=== Finchampstead ===
Finchampstead Election Results by Party in 2024
1. Liberal Democrats (UK) (43.8%)
2. Conservative Party (UK) (49.2%)
3. Labour Party (UK) (6.60%)

Finchampstead was formed by merging Finchampstead North with the majority of Finchampstead South, excluding the Western part of the ward centred on Arborfield Green which is part of Barkham & Arborfield.

Both former Finchampstead wards elected two councillors. David Cornish and Rebecca Margetts were incumbent councillors for Finchampstead South, whilst Peter Harper and Charles Margetts were incumbent councillors for Finchampstead North. As all four incumbents standing in Finchampstead, it was one of two wards in the election (the other being Maiden Erlegh & Whitegates) with more incumbents standing than there were seats available.

Finchampstead
Party	Candidate	Votes	%	±%
Conservative	Charles Margetts*	1,715	47.4	
Conservative	Rebecca Margetts*	1,707	47.2	
Conservative	Peter Harper*	1,677	46.4	
Liberal Democrats	David Cornish*	1,635	45.2	
Liberal Democrats	Becky Eytle	1,498	41.4	
Liberal Democrats	Fiona Dignan	1,404	38.8	
Labour	Judy Clark	246	6.8	
Labour	Grace Tapping	238	6.6	
Labour	Ian Hills	196	5.4	
Rejected ballots		24		
Turnout		3,641	44.8	
Conservative win (new seat)				
Conservative win (new seat)				
Conservative win (new seat)				

=== Hawkedon ===
Hawkedon Election Results by Party in 2024
1. Liberal Democrats (UK) (44.0%)
2. Conservative Party (UK) (42.3%)
3. Labour Party (UK) (13.3%)

Hawkedon gained a part of the former Maiden Erlegh ward in the North. Incumbent councillor Clive Jones (Liberal Democrat) stood down to focus on his parliamentary candidacy in the Wokingham constituency.

Hawkedon
Party	Candidate	Votes	%	±%
Liberal Democrats	David Hare*	1,433	43.6	
Conservative	Rohit Ahlawat	1,413	43.0	
Liberal Democrats	Melanie De Jong	1,356	41.2	
Liberal Democrats	Andrew Mickleburgh*	1,355	41.2	
Conservative	Tim Holton	1,293	39.3	
Conservative	Guy Grandison	1,274	38.8	
Labour	Mark Craske	527	16.0	
Labour	Carmel Law-Sinha	386	11.7	
Labour	Harry McKeown	338	10.3	
Rejected ballots		13		
Turnout		3,300	42.2	
Liberal Democrats hold				
Conservative gain from Liberal Democrats				
Liberal Democrats hold				

=== Hillside ===
Hillside Election Results by Party in 2024
1. Liberal Democrats (UK) (40.6%)
2. Conservative Party (UK) (44.2%)
3. Labour Party (UK) (11.4%)
4. Green Party of England and Wales (3.60%)

Hillside gained part of the former Maiden Erlegh Ward, notably that part of the ward which included parts of the Reading University campus and a few roads from Shinfield. Three incumbent Hillside councillors stood - Pauline Jorgensen, Al Neale and Caroline Smith. Jorgensen also stood as the Conservative Parliamentary candidate for the new seat of Earley and Woodley which includes this ward.

Hillside
Party	Candidate	Votes	%	±%
Conservative	Pauline Jorgensen*	1,699	48.7	
Conservative	Moses Iyengunmwena	1,399	40.1	
Liberal Democrats	Caroline Smith*	1,376	39.4	
Liberal Democrats	Al Neal*	1,324	37.9	
Liberal Democrats	Ryan Browne	1,307	37.4	
Conservative	Salman Afzal	1,263	36.2	
Labour	Evan Ainsworth	421	12.1	
Labour	Hari Sarasan	401	11.5	
Green	Harrison Watson	353	10.1	
Labour	Jacqueline Rupert	305	8.7	
Rejected ballots		14		
Turnout		3,504	46.7	
Conservative hold				
Conservative gain from Liberal Democrats				
Liberal Democrats hold				

=== Loddon ===
Loddon Election Results by Party in 2024
1. Liberal Democrats (UK) (11.7%)
2. Conservative Party (UK) (37.9%)
3. Labour Party (UK) (49.8%)

Under the new boundaries, the most South West part of Loddon was instead included in South Lake. Loddon's Eastern boundary remained unchanged, continuing to follow the Woodley parish boundary.

Loddon
Party	Candidate	Votes	%	±%
Labour	Greg Bello	1,338	49.1	
Labour	Majid Nagra	1,316	48.3	
Labour	Alex Freeney	1,159	42.5	
Conservative	David Bragg	1,033	37.9	
Conservative	Bill Soane*	1,003	36.8	
Conservative	Abdul Loyes*	869	31.9	
Liberal Democrats	Alex Heap	406	14.9	
Liberal Democrats	Ally Fraser	254	9.3	
Liberal Democrats	Irene Khayinza	240	8.8	
Rejected ballots		23		
Turnout		2,748	40.2	
Labour gain from Conservative				
Labour gain from Conservative				
Labour gain from Conservative				

=== Maiden Erlegh & Whitegates ===
Maiden Erlegh & Whitegates Election Results by Party in 2024
1. Liberal Democrats (UK) (33.2%)
2. Conservative Party (UK) (31.0%)
3. Labour Party (UK) (27.5%)
4. Green Party of England and Wales (4.70%)
5. Independent (politician) (3.20%)

The new ward consists of the Whitegates area of the former Bulmershe & Whitegates ward merged with a reduced Maiden Erlegh ward. Parts of Maiden Erlegh ward were lost to Hillside and Hawkedon wards.

Norman Jorgensen, Stephen Newton and Mike Smith were incumbent councillors for Maiden Erlegh, whilst Tony Skuse was an incumbent councillor for Bulmershe & Whitegates. This makes it one of two wards, alongside Finchampstead, where there were more incumbent councillors standing than there are seats available.

Skuse's fellow Bulmershe & Whitegates councillors stood in different wards. Shahid Younis (Conservative) stood in the new Bulmershe & Coronation ward and Andy Croy (Labour) stood in Wescott in the East of the Borough.

Andy Siu-Hong Ng was a Democratic Party Councillor in Hong Kong. On relocating to Wokingham he stood again as a Councillor, for the Liberal Democrats.

Maiden Erlegh & Whitegates
Party	Candidate	Votes	%	±%
Conservative	Norman Jorgensen*	1,187	31.8	
Liberal Democrats	Stephen Newton*	1,182	31.7	
Liberal Democrats	Andy Siu-Hong Ng	1,162	31.1	
Liberal Democrats	Mike Smith*	1,133	30.4	
Conservative	Wazir Hussain	1,110	29.8	
Labour	Richard McKenzie	1,026	27.5	
Labour	Vikram Duhan	959	25.7	
Conservative	Ranga Madhu	956	25.6	
Labour	Tony Skuse*	898	24.1	
Green	Samuel Langlois	493	13.2	
Independent	Ibrahim Mohammed	336	9.0	
Rejected ballots		21		
Turnout		3,752	46.07	
Conservative win (new seat)				
Liberal Democrats win (new seat)				
Liberal Democrats win (new seat)				

=== Norreys ===
Norreys Election Results by Party in 2024
1. Liberal Democrats (UK) (18.6%)
2. Conservative Party (UK) (33.7%)
3. Labour Party (UK) (46.4%)
4. Trade Union and Socialist Coalition (0.90%)

Norreys lost part of the ward to Wescott with a small part of Wescott moving the other way for this election.

Norreys
Party	Candidate	Votes	%	±%
Labour	Rachel Burgess*	1,398	52.0	
Labour	Marie-Louise Weighill*	1,128	42.0	
Labour	Nagi Nagella	1,063	39.6	
Conservative	Phil Cunnington*	963	35.9	
Conservative	Lisa Jane Fairweather	853	31.8	
Conservative	Roger Greer	786	29.3	
Liberal Democrats	Matteo Fumagalli	524	19.5	
Liberal Democrats	Warren Dixon	495	18.4	
Liberal Democrats	Paul Sayers	421	15.7	
TUSC	Sara Gillman	69	2.6	
Rejected ballots		14		
Turnout		2,700	39.6	
Labour hold				
Labour hold				
Labour gain from Conservative				

=== Shinfield ===
Shinfield Election Results by Party in 2024
1. Liberal Democrats (UK) (16.3%)
2. Conservative Party (UK) (40.2%)
3. Labour Party (UK) (43.0%)

The new Shinfield ward was made up of the former Shinfield North ward and part of Shinfield South to form one three-councillor ward. Labour's Andrew Gray is the incumbent councillor for Shinfield North, whilst Conservative Jackie Rance is an incumbent councillor for Shinfield South, Rance's two fellow incumbents for Shinfield South, Catherine Glover and Chris Johnson (both Liberal Democrats), chose to instead stand in Spencers Wood and Swallowfield.

Shinfield
Party	Candidate	Votes	%	±%
Labour	Sarah Bell	997	42.9	
Labour	Andrew Gray*	923	39.7	
Conservative	Vishal Srinivasan	881	37.9	
Conservative	Jackie Rance*	868	37.3	
Labour	Varinder Anand	867	37.3	
Conservative	Hilary Pollock	855	36.8	
Liberal Democrats	Shanks Garg	405	17.4	
Liberal Democrats	Nicola Brock	397	17.1	
Liberal Democrats	Bob Wharton	253	10.9	
Rejected ballots		17		
Turnout		2,341	33.36	
Labour win (new seat)				
Labour win (new seat)				
Conservative win (new seat)				

=== South Lake ===
South Lake Election Results by Party in 2024
1. Liberal Democrats (UK) (39.2%)
2. Conservative Party (UK) (40.2%)
3. Labour Party (UK) (20.2%)

South Lake gained part of the Loddon ward, as well as a smaller part of the former Bulmershe and Whitegates ward. South Lake previously elected two members, whilst the new South Lake, as with all the new wards, has three members.

Beth Rowland served as Wokingham Borough Mayor, presiding over meetings of the council. The other South Lake incumbent councillor, Laura Blumenthal (Conservative) stood down to focus on her parliamentary candidacy in Brentford & Isleworth.

South Lake
Party	Candidate	Votes	%	±%
Conservative	Kay Gilder	1,180	41.6	
Liberal Democrats	Beth Rowland*	1,080	38.1	
Liberal Democrats	Carol Jewel	1,065	37.6	
Conservative	James Bourke	1056	37.2	
Liberal Democrats	Nigel Harman	1008	35.5	
Conservative	Michaela Dalton	994	35.0	
Labour	Tom Clark	616	21.7	
Labour	Ann Dally	571	20.1	
Labour	Stevie Horton	435	15.3	
Rejected ballots		19		
Turnout		2,855	38.58	
Conservative hold				
Liberal Democrats hold				
Liberal Democrats win (new seat)				

=== Spencers Wood & Swallowfield ===
Spencers Wood and Swallowfield Election Results by Party in 2024
1. Liberal Democrats (UK) (41.0%)
2. Conservative Party (UK) (43.2%)
3. Labour Party (UK) (9.80%)
4. Green Party of England and Wales (5.60%)

Spencers Wood and Swallowfield comprises the former Swallowfield ward and part of the former Shinfield South ward to make a single three member ward. Catherine Glover and Chris Johnson were incumbent councillors for Shinfield South, whilst Stuart Munro was the incumbent councillor for Swallowfield. Glover and Johnson's fellow Shinfield South incumbent, Conservative Jackie Rance, stood instead in Shinfield.

Adam Gillman sought to stand in Spencers Wood and Swallowfield for the Trade Union and Socialist Coalition, however his candidacy was rejected on the grounds that '[t]he particulars of the candidate are not as required by law'. Adam would later write to the Socialist clarifying “Despite being 18 years old and eligible to vote in the 2 May election, they explained that I couldn’t stand, because the nomination deadline was three days before my 18th birthday.” Gillman was the only candidate whose nomination was not accepted by the Returning Officer in the election.

Spencers Wood & Swallowfield
Party	Candidate	Votes	%	±%
Liberal Democrats	Catherine Glover*	1,189	43.6	
Conservative	Dave Edmonds	1,103	40.4	
Conservative	Stuart Munro*	1,077	39.5	
Conservative	Anthony Pollock	1047	38.4	
Liberal Democrats	Chris Johnson*	1020	37.4	
Liberal Democrats	Dominic Rider	856	31.4	
Green	Tom Blomley	418	15.3	
Labour	June Taylor	259	9.5	
Labour	Will Gale	252	9.2	
Labour	Stuart Hooper	224	8.2	
Rejected ballots		18		
Turnout		2,748	35.38	
Liberal Democrats win (new seat)				
Conservative win (new seat)				
Conservative win (new seat)				

=== Thames ===
Thames Election Results by Party in 2024
1. Liberal Democrats (UK) (40.8%)
2. Conservative Party (UK) (46.4%)
3. Labour Party (UK) (12.6%)

Thames ward comprised the parishes of Charvil, Sonning, Remenham and Wargrave. Charvil and Sonning which were previously their own single-member wards, although the Sonning ward did not strictly follow the parish boundary and included a small part of North Woodley. Remenham and Wargrave were combined with the parish of Ruscombe into the two-member ward of Remenham, Wargrave & Ruscombe. Ruscombe is now part of the new Twyford, Ruscombe & Hurst ward.

Sam Akhtar was the incumbent councillor for Charvil and Michael Firmager was the incumbent councillor for Sonning. Wayne Smith was the incumbent for the ward of Hurst, which was combined into the new ward of Twyford, Ruscombe & Hurst.

Both incumbents for Remenham, Wargrave & Ruscombe, John Halsall and Graham Howe (both Conservative), stood down. Halsall served as Leader of the council during the COVID-19 pandemic.

Thames
Party	Candidate	Votes	%	±%
Conservative	Sam Akhtar*	1,416	53.6	
Conservative	Wayne Smith*	1,284	48.6	
Liberal Democrats	Katrin Harding	1,217	46.1	
Conservative	Michael Firmager*	1,186	44.9	
Liberal Democrats	Yonni Wilson	1,172	44.4	
Liberal Democrats	Paddy Power	1,027	38.9	
Labour	Stuart Crainer	380	14.4	
Labour	Tracy Hugman	355	13.4	
Labour	Brian Scott	317	12.0	
Rejected ballots		12	0.1	
Turnout		2,953	41.5	
Conservative win (new seat)				
Conservative win (new seat)				
Liberal Democrats win (new seat)				

=== Twyford, Ruscombe & Hurst ===
Twyford, Ruscombe & Hurst Election Results by Party in 2024
1. Liberal Democrats (UK) (68.6%)
2. Conservative Party (UK) (19.8%)
3. Labour Party (UK) (6.70%)
4. Green Party of England and Wales (4.80%)

Twyford, Ruscombe & Hurst was created from the parishes of Hurst, Ruscombe and Twyford. Hurst and Twyford were previously their own wards, electing one and two members respectively. Ruscombe was previously part of the two-member Wargrave, Remenham & Ruscombe ward.

Stephen Conway is an incumbent councillor for Twyford, and the current Leader of the council. The incumbent councillor for Hurst, Wayne Smith (Conservative), is standing in the new Thames ward.

Twyford, Ruscombe & Hurst
Party	Candidate	Votes	%	±%
Liberal Democrats	Stephen Conway*	2,456	72.6	
Liberal Democrats	Martin Alder	2,027	60.0	
Liberal Democrats	Martijn Andrea	2,008	59.4	
Conservative	John Jarvis	719	21.3	
Conservative	Grant Woolner	579	17.1	
Conservative	George Malcolm	576	17.0	
Green	Merv Boniface	453	13.4	
Labour	Rona Noble	250	7.4	
Labour	Roy Mantel	211	6.2	
Labour	Peter Tang	170	5.0	
Rejected ballots		14		
Turnout		3,395	43.1	
Liberal Democrats win (new seat)				
Liberal Democrats win (new seat)				
Liberal Democrats win (new seat)				

=== Wescott ===
Wescott Election Results by Party in 2024
1. Liberal Democrats (UK) (43.8%)
2. Conservative Party (UK) (32.9%)
3. Labour Party (UK) (17.8%)
4. Green Party of England and Wales (5.40%)

Wescott gained part of the Norreys ward and lost a small part to Norreys as a result of the boundary review. Wescott ward was previously a two-member ward, but it will now be a three-member ward. Jane Ainslie was a councillor for Wescott under the previous boundaries, whilst Andy Croy was a councillor for the abolished Bulmershe & Whitegates ward in the West of the Borough.

Wescott
Party	Candidate	Votes	%	±%
Liberal Democrats	Jane Ainslie*	1,318	46.8	
Liberal Democrats	Rob Comber	1,202	42.6	
Liberal Democrats	Chris Cooke	990	35.1	
Conservative	Gregor Murray	964	34.2	
Conservative	James Pett	879	31.2	
Conservative	Raj Sharma	791	28.1	
Labour	Andy Croy*	661	23.4	
Green	Dave Chapman	433	15.4	
Labour	Paula Montie	392	13.9	
Labour	Aaron Pearson	370	13.1	
Rejected ballots		7		
Turnout		2,826	37.4	
Liberal Democrats hold				
Liberal Democrats hold				
Liberal Democrats win (new seat)				

=== Winnersh ===
Winnersh Election Results by Party in 2024
1. Liberal Democrats (UK) (61.0%)
2. Conservative Party (UK) (26.1%)
3. Labour Party (UK) (11.4%)
4. Trade Union and Socialist Coalition (1.10%)

Winnersh ward was unaffected by the boundary changes. Accordingly, Prue Bray, Paul Fishwick and Rachelle Shepherd-DuBey were also councillors for Winnersh under the previous boundaries.

Winnersh
Party	Candidate	Votes	%	±%
Liberal Democrats	Prue Bray*	1,703	63.4	
Liberal Democrats	Rachelle Shepherd-DuBey*	1,473	54.8	
Liberal Democrats	Paul Fishwick*	1,460	54.4	
Conservative	Anne Chadwick	755	28.1	
Conservative	Jonathan Pollock	620	23.1	
Conservative	Martyn Washbourne	609	22.7	
Labour	David Evans	305	11.4	
Labour	Paul Eastaugh	301	11.2	
Labour	Allan Murungi	263	9.8	
TUSC	John Gillman	83	3.1	
Rejected ballots		14		
Turnout		2,700	34.0	
Liberal Democrats hold				
Liberal Democrats hold				
Liberal Democrats hold				

=== Wokingham Without ===
Wokingham Without Election Results by Party in 2024
1. Liberal Democrats (UK) (48.8%)
2. Conservative Party (UK) (44.0%)
3. Labour Party (UK) (6.70%)

Wokingham Without was unchanged by the boundary review. Accordingly, David Davies and Jordan Montgomery were also councillors for Wokingham Without under the previous boundaries.

Wokingham Without
Party	Candidate	Votes	%	±%
Liberal Democrats	Marc Brunel-Walker	1,267	49.6	N/A
Liberal Democrats	Jordan Montgomery*	1,256	49.2	N/A
Conservative	Séona Turtle	1,117	43.7	N/A
Conservative	David Davies*	1082	42.3	N/A
Liberal Democrats	Chris Salmon	977	38.2	N/A
Conservative	Ullakarin Clark	958	37.5	N/A
Labour	Joyce Lam	181	7.1	N/A
Labour	Alex Fry	161	6.3	N/A
Labour	Jac Pluves	137	5.4	N/A
Rejected ballots		18		
Turnout		2,573	40.31	N/A
Liberal Democrats gain from Conservative				
Liberal Democrats hold				
Conservative hold				

== Changes 2024-2026 ==
=== Affiliation changes ===
January 2025 - Alex Freeney (Labour, Loddon) sits as an Independent.

September 2025 - Majid Nagra (Labour, Loddon) sits as an Independent.

March 2026 - Majid Nagra (Labour, Loddon) sits as a Green.

=== By-elections ===
==== Shinfield ====
Shinfield by-election: 4 December 2024
Party	Candidate	Votes	%	±%
Conservative	Jackie Rance	765	49.0	+10.4
Labour	Becca Brown	387	24.8	–18.9
Liberal Democrats	Chris Johnson	336	21.5	+3.8
Green	Gary Shacklady	73	4.7	N/A
Majority		378	24.2	N/A
Turnout		1,563	21.7	–11.7
Conservative gain from Labour		Swing	▲14.7	

==== Winnersh ====
Winnersh by-election: 6 February 2025
Party	Candidate	Votes	%	±%
Liberal Democrats	Chetne Jamthe	1,177	53.0	−10.4
Conservative	Nick Kilby	833	37.0	+8.9
Labour	Parvinder Singh	126	6.0	–5.4
Green	Samuel Langlois	99	4.0	N/A
Majority		344	0.00	N/A
Turnout		2,235	28.07	–5.9
Liberal Democrats hold		Swing	{{{swing}}}	

==== Maiden Erlegh & Whitegates ====
Maiden Erlegh & Whitegates: 5 June 2025
Party	Candidate	Votes	%	±%
Liberal Democrats	Mike Smith	1,028	31.2	−0.5
Labour	Andy Croy	793	24.0	−3.5
Conservative	Guy Grandison	788	23.9	−7.9
Reform UK	Andrew Harris	486	14.7	N/A
Green	Samuel Langlois	180	5.5	−7.7
TUSC	Sara Gillman	17	0.5	N/A
Majority		235	7.1	N/A
Turnout		3,300	39.95	–6.12
Liberal Democrats gain from Conservative		Swing	▼0.5	

== Council Membership by party after each election 2010–2025 ==
Election results 2010–2025
Party	2010	2011	2012	2014	2015	2016	2018	2019	2021	2022	2023	2024	2025
Conservative	43	45	43	44	47	47	42	31	31	26	22	19	19
Labour	0	0	0	1	1	1	3	4	3	3	5	8	6
Liberal Democrats	11	9	10	7	5	5	8	16	18	23	26	27	28
Other parties	0	0	1	2	1	1	1	3	2	2	1	0	1
Total Seats	54	54	54	54	54	54	54	54	54	54	54	54	54
