= Wokingham Borough Council =

Local authority of the Borough of Wokingham

Type
- Type: Unitary authority

History
- Founded: 1 April 1974

Leadership
- Mayor: Rob Comber, Liberal Democrat since 21 May 2026
- Leader: Stephen Conway, Liberal Democrat since 18 May 2023
- Chief Executive: Susan Parsonage since March 2019

Structure
- Seats: 54 councillors
- Political groups: Administration (29) Liberal Democrats (29) Other parties (25) Conservative (19) Labour (5) Green Party (1)
- Length of term: Third of council elected three years out of four

Elections
- Voting system: Plurality-at-large
- Last election: 7 May 2026
- Next election: 6 May 2027

Meeting place
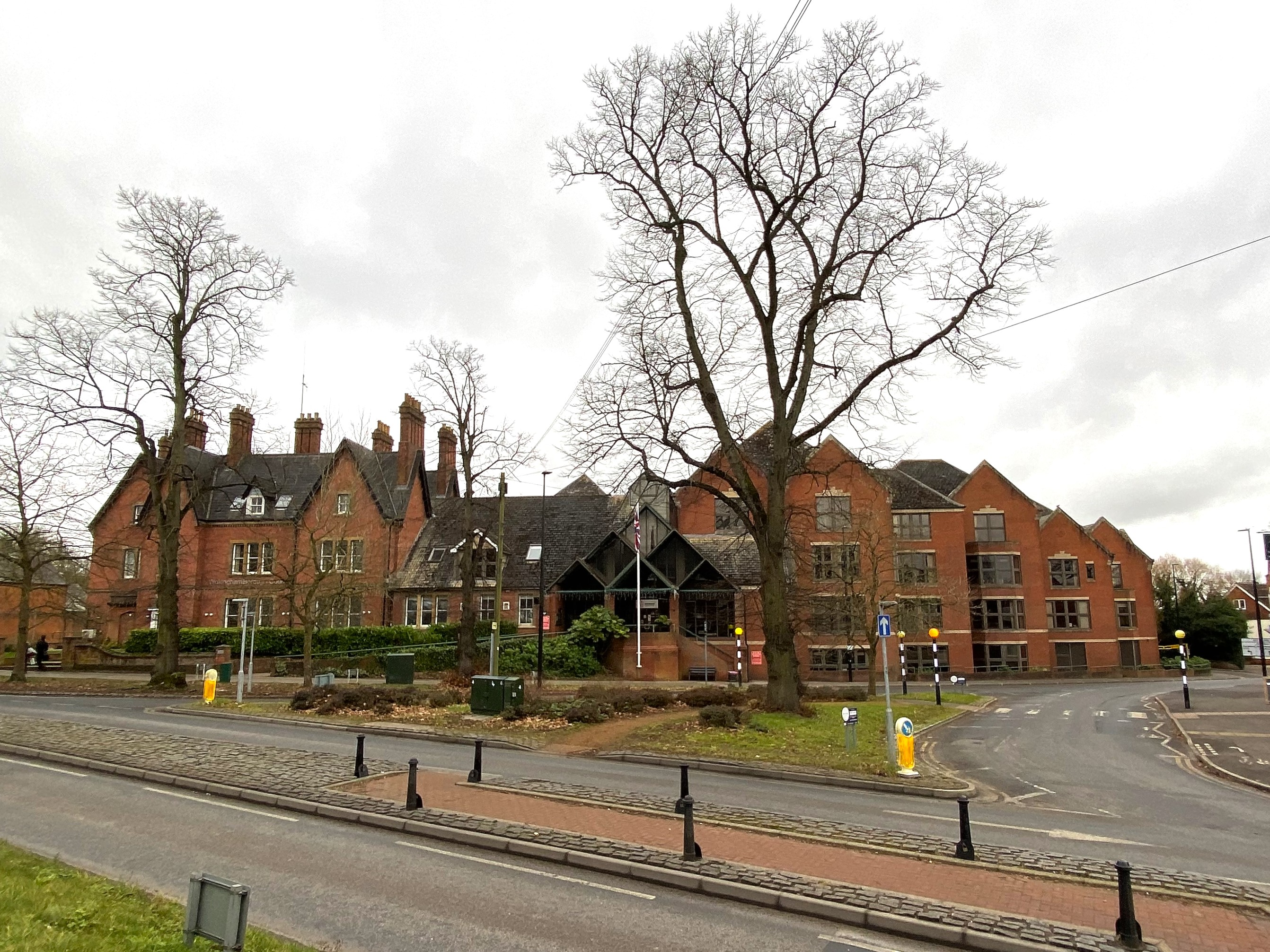
- Civic Offices, Shute End, Wokingham, RG40 1BN

Website
- www.wokingham.gov.uk

Results map of the 2022 election

Wokingham Borough Council is the local authority of the Borough of Wokingham in Berkshire, England. Since 1998 the council has been a unitary authority, being a district council which also performs the functions of a county council. It is based at the Civic Offices on Shute End in the town of Wokingham.

The council has been under Liberal Democrat majority control since 2025.

== History ==
The town of Wokingham was incorporated as a municipal borough in 1885. The municipal borough was abolished in 1974 under the Local Government Act 1972, merging with the surrounding Wokingham Rural District to become a new non-metropolitan district called Wokingham.

Until 1998 Wokingham was a lower-tier district council, with Berkshire County Council providing county-level services to the area. The county council was abolished in 1998 and Wokingham became a unitary authority, taking over the county council's functions in the area. The council was awarded borough status in 2007, allowing the chair of the council to take the title of mayor.

== Political control ==
From 2022 the council was under no overall control. Following the 2022 election a Liberal Democrat-led coalition with Labour and the independent councillors formed to run the council. Following the 2024 election the Liberal Democrats had exactly half the council's seats and formed a minority administration.

On 5 June 2025, the Liberal Democrats gained their 28th member in a by-election, giving them a majority of the seats on the council. They retained their majority at the 2026 election.

The first elections to Wokingham District Council were held in 1973, initially acting as a shadow authority alongside the outgoing authorities until the new arrangements took effect on 1 April 1974. Political control since 1974 has been as follows:

Lower-tier non-metropolitan district

Party in control	Years
No overall control	1974–1976
Conservative	1976–1995
No overall control	1995–1996
Liberal Democrats	1996–1997
Conservative	1997–1998

Unitary authority

Party in control	Years
Conservative	1998–2000
No overall control	2000–2002
Conservative	2002–2022
No overall control	2022–2025
Liberal Democrats	2025–Present

=== Leadership ===
The role of mayor is largely ceremonial in Wokingham, and is usually held by a different councillor each year. Political leadership is instead provided by the leader of the council. The leaders since 1995 have been:

Councillor	Party	From	To
Simon Etheridge	Conservative	1995	1996
Alan Spratling	Liberal Democrats	1996	1997
Simon Etheridge	Conservative	1997	Sep 1999
Perry Lewis	Conservative	Sep 1999	2000
Alan Spratling	Liberal Democrats	2000	2002
Frank Browne	Conservative	2002	4 May 2008
David Lee	Conservative	22 May 2008	12 Jun 2014
Keith Baker	Conservative	12 Jun 2014	18 May 2017
Charlotte Haitham-Taylor	Conservative	18 May 2017	22 Nov 2018
Julian McGhee-Sumner	Conservative	14 Dec 2018	5 May 2019
John Halsall	Conservative	22 May 2019	19 May 2022
Clive Jones	Liberal Democrats	19 May 2022	18 May 2023
Stephen Conway	Liberal Democrats	18 May 2023	Present

=== Composition ===
Following the 2026 election, the composition of the council was:

Party	Councillors
Liberal Democrats	29
Conservative	19
Labour	5
Green	1
Total	54

The next election is due in 2027.

== Elections ==
Since the last boundary changes in 2024 the council has comprised 54 councillors representing 18 wards, with each ward electing three councillors. Elections are held three years out of every four, with a third of the council (one councillor for each ward) elected each time for a four-year term of office.

In October 2024 Labour Councillor Sarah Bell resigned and the Conservative candidate Jackie Rance gained the seat in November 2024. In January 2025 Labour Councillor Alex Freeney resigned the Labour whip and became independent.

In June 2025, following the death of Conservative Councillor Norman Jorgensen, a by-election was held and the Liberal Democrat Candidate, Mike Smith gained the seat, which meant that control of the Council went to the Liberal Democrats.

== Premises ==
The council's main offices are the Civic Offices at Shute End in Wokingham. The building began as a house, built c. 1870 as the rectory for nearby St Paul's Church. It was purchased by Wokingham Rural District Council in 1939 and converted to become their offices. The building passed to the new Wokingham District Council when local government was reorganised in 1974. A large extension was added to the west of the original house in 1988.
