= Alder Moors =

Nature reserve in Berkshire, England

Coordinates: 51.459°N 0.886°W

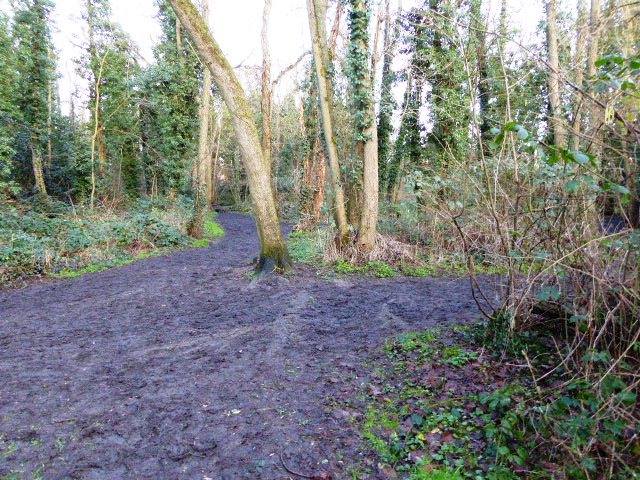
- Interactive map of Alder Moors
- Type: Local Nature Reserve
- Location: Woodley, Berkshire
- OS grid: SU 775 739
- Area: 8.5 hectares (21 acres)
- Manager: Wokingham District Council

Alder Moors is a 8.5-hectare (21-acre) Local Nature Reserve in Woodley, a suburb of Reading in Berkshire. It is owned and managed by Wokingham District Council.

The name 'Aldermoors' derives from the alder trees that populate this reserve. It is ancient woodland with coppiced areas.

== History ==
In 1990 the site was declared as a local nature reserve by Wokingham Borough Council.

== Fauna ==
The site has the following fauna:

=== Mammals ===
- Common shrew
- European rabbit
- Red fox

=== Invertebrates ===
- Green-veined white
- Holly blue
- Aglais io
- Polygonia c-album
- Speckled wood
- Hornet moth
- Kidney Spot ladybird
- Stigmella aurella
- Holly leaf miner

=== Birds ===
- Mallard
- Canada goose
- Red kite
- Eurasian sparrowhawk
- Common buzzard
- Common chiffchaff
- Eurasian blackcap
- Eurasian wren
- Anser anser
- Ardea cinerea
- Certhia familiaris
- Cygnus olor
- Common chaffinch
- Coot

=== Amphibians & reptiles ===
- Common frog
- Grass snake

== Flora ==
The site has the following flora:

=== Trees ===
- Acer campestre
- Acer pseudoplatanus
- Alnus glutinosa
- Corylus avellana
- Crataegus monogyna
- Fraxinus excelsior
- Ilex aquifolium
- Prunus avium
- Prunus cerasifera
- Prunus spinosa
- Quercus robur
- Sambucus nigra
- Taxus baccata
- Ulmus procera
- Taxus baccata

=== Plants ===
- Adoxa moschatellina
- Alliaria petiolata
- Anemone nemorosa
- Angelica sylvestris
- Anthriscus caucalis
- Anthriscus sylvestris
- Arctium minus
- Arum maculatum
- Asplenium scolopendrium
- Bellis perennis
- Brachypodium sylvaticum
- Bryonia dioica
- Caltha palustris
- Cardamine flexuosa
- Carex pendula
- Chelidonium majus
- Chrysosplenium oppositifolium
- Cirsium arvense
- Cirsium vulgare
- Dactylis glomerata
- Dryopteris cristata
- Euphorbia peplus
- Ficaria verna
- Filipendula ulmaria
- Galium aparine
- Geranium lucidum
- Geranium robertianum
- Geum urbanum
- Glechoma hederacea
- Heracleum sphondylium
- Holcus lanatus
- Hyacinthoides non-scripta
- Hypericum androsaemum
- Impatiens glandulifera
- Iris pseudacorus
- Juncus effusus
- Juncus inflexus
- Lamiastrum galeobdolon ssp. argentatum
- Lamium album
- Lamium purpureum
- Lolium perenne
- Lonicera periclymenum
- Lunaria annua
- Luzula pilosa
- Lysimachia nummularia
- Lysimachia nemorum
- Mentha aquatica
- Mercurialis perennis
- Myosotis sylvatica
- Oenanthe crocata
- Oxalis acetosella
- Pentaglottis sempervirens
- Plantago major
- Poa annua
- Polypodium vulgare
- Polystichum setiferum
- Primula vulgaris
- Pteridium aquilinum
- Ranunculus ficaria
- Ranunculus repens
- Ribes rubrum
- Rubus fruticosus agg.
- Rumex obtusifolius
- Scrophularia auriculata
- Stellaria holostea
- Stellaria media
- Taraxacum officinale agg.
- Ulex europaeus
- Urtica dioica
- Veronica hederifolia
- Veronica montana
- Veronica persica
- Viola odorata
- Viola reichenbachiana
- Viola riviniana

=== Mosses & Liverworts ===
- Hypnum cupressiforme
- Orthotrichum affine
- Polytrichastrum formosum
- Pellia epiphylla

=== Lichens ===
- Flavoparmelia caperata
- Lecanora chlarotera
- Lecidella elaeochroma
- Lepraria incana
- Parmelia sulcata
- Parmotrema perlatum
- Phaeophyscia orbicularis
- Physcia adscendens
- Physcia tenella
- Ramalina farinacea
- Xanthoria parietina

=== Fungi ===
- Phragmidium violaceum
