= Holly leaf miner =

Holly leaf miner is a common name for several insects and may refer to:

- Phytomyza ilicicola, native to North America
- Phytomyza ilicis, native to Europe and introduced to North America
