= Emmanuel Church, Woodley =

Coordinates: 51.4451°N 0.9019°W

- Emmanuel Church, Woodley
- Location: South Lake Crescent; Woodley; Reading; RG5 3QW
- Country: England
- Denomination: Church of England
- Website: www.emmanuelwoodley.org.uk

History
- Founded: May 1991
- Founder(s): Rev. Ian Watson (Vicar of Woodley); Richard Priestley; Mandy Priestley

Administration
- Division: Archdeaconary of Berkshire
- Diocese: Diocese of Oxford
- Parish: Woodley - Emmanuel

Clergy
- Priest(s): Rev. Rose Jones; Rev. Claire Jones

Emmanuel Church, Woodley, is an Anglican church in Woodley, close to Reading in the English county of Berkshire.

It is a Church of England church in the Reading Deanery of the Diocese of Oxford. The church was planted in 1991 by a group of people from St John's and St James' Churches led by Church Army evangelists Richard and Mandy Priestley. In 2023, the vicars were Rose Jones and Claire Jones.

In 2010, District Church Councils were established at both St Johns Church and Emmanuel Church giving a greater degree of independence to each church and enabling council meetings to be much more focused. The District Church Councils were accountable to the Parochial Church Council which retained overall responsibility for governance in the parish.

In April 2012, the parish boundaries in Woodley were changed and Emmanuel Church became part of an enlarged parish of Southlake St James. Both parishes in Woodley form the Woodley Group Ministry, and maintain close relations.

The change of parish also brought about a change of status for Emmanuel Church, which became a Conventional District in the parish of Southlake and now has its own Parochial Church Council.

From 1 September 2018 Emmanuel was granted approval from Deanery, Diocese and Government to become its own parish known as Woodley Emmanuel, therefore having its own Parochial Church Council.
