= Highwood =

Highwood may refer to:

== People ==
- Sidney Highwood (1896–1975), World War I flying ace

== Places ==
=== Canada ===
- Highwood, Calgary, a neighbourhood in Calgary, Alberta
- Highwood (electoral district), a provincial electoral district in Alberta
- Highwood River, a river in Alberta

=== United Kingdom ===
- Highwood, Devon
- Highwood, Dorset
- Highwood, Essex
- Highwood, Hampshire
- Highwood, Wokingham, a Local Nature Reserve
- Highwood, Worcestershire

=== United States ===
- Highwood, Illinois
  - Highwood station, a commuter rail station in Highwood, Illinois
- Highwood, Montana
- Highwood, Wisconsin
- Highwood, Hamden, a neighborhood in the town of Hamden, Connecticut

=== Philippines ===
- Highwood, Batangas, Philippines

== See also ==
- Highwood, hymn tune by R.R. Terry.
- High Wood, a wood in north-east France, scene of a World War I conflict
