= Deanery of Reading =

The Deanery of Reading lies within the Church of England Archdeaconry of Berkshire in the Diocese of Oxford. As of 2007, there were reported to be 3,428 members of churches within the deanery.

== Deans ==
Rural deans

- 1859 Rev. John Wilder

Area deans

- -2013: Canon Brian Shenton
- 2014-2017: Rev'd Stephen Pullin
- 2017- : Rev'd Dr Graeme Fancourt

== Churches ==
There are 35 churches in the Deanery of Reading, as of 2024, down from 39 in 2015:

1. St Mary The Virgin, Beech Hill
2. St Andrew, Caversham
3. St John the Baptist, Caversham
4. St Peter, Caversham
5. St Nicolas, Earley
6. St Peter, Earley
7. St Barnabas, Emmer Green
8. Trinity Church, Lower Earley
9. St Margaret's, Mapledurham
10. All Saints, Reading
11. Christ Church, Reading
12. Greyfriars, Reading
13. Holy Trinity, Reading
14. Minister of St Mary the Virgin, Reading
15. New Hope Community Church, Reading
16. St Agnes, Reading
17. St Barnabas, Reading
18. St Bartholomew, Reading
19. St Giles, Reading
20. St John the Evangelist and St Stephen, Reading
21. St Laurence, Reading
22. St Luke, Reading
23. St Mark, Reading
24. St Matthews, Reading
25. St Paul, Reading
26. St Mary's, Shinfield
27. St Michael's & All Angels, Spencer's Wood
28. All Saints, Swallowfield
29. St Catherine of Siena, Tilehurst
30. St George, Tilehurst
31. St Mary Magdalen, Tilehurst
32. St Michael, Tilehurst
33. Emmanuel, Woodley
34. St James, Woodley
35. St John the Evangelist, Woodley
