= Waingels College =

Waingels

Location
- Waingels Road; Woodley, Berkshire, RG5 4RF; England
- Coordinates: 51.464722°N 0.889722°W

Information
- Type: Academy
- Motto: Better Never Stops
- Local authority: Wokingham Borough Council
- Trust: Orchard Learning Alliance
- Department for Education URN: 142166 Tables
- Ofsted: Reports
- Head teacher: Lindsey Humber
- Gender: Mixed
- Age range: 11–18
- Enrolment: 1,291 (2020)
- Capacity: 1,331
- Colours: Green, red, yellow
- Website: www.waingels.wokingham.sch.uk

Waingels is an 11–18 mixed, secondary school and sixth form with academy status in Woodley, Berkshire, England.

== Notable alumni ==
- James Henry, professional footballer
- Irwin Sparkes, musician (member of The Hoosiers)
- David Warburton, pianist, businessman, and politician
- Charlotte Nichols, member of parliament for Warrington North.
