= Woodley, Berkshire =

Town and civil parish in Berkshire, England

Coordinates: 51.453°N 0.902°W

Woodley
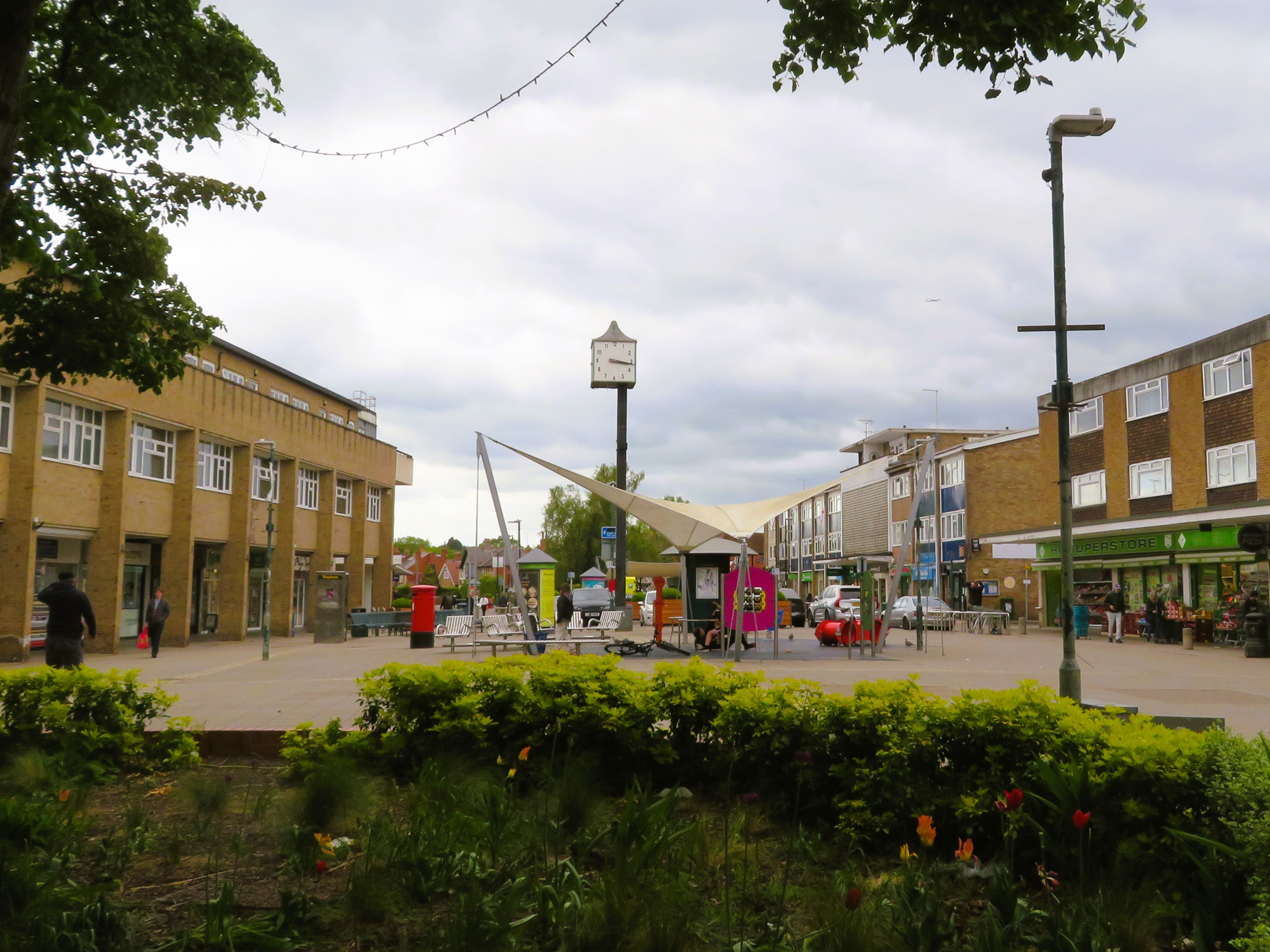
- Shopping precinct, Crockhamwell Road

- Location within Berkshire
- Interactive map of Woodley
- Population: 28,848 (Parish, 2021); 28,025 (Built up area, 2021)
- OS grid reference: SU7673
  - London: 35 mi (56 km) E
- Civil parish: Woodley
- Unitary authority: Wokingham
- Ceremonial county: Berkshire
- Region: South East
- Country: England
- Sovereign state: United Kingdom
- Post town: Reading
- Postcode district: RG5
- Dialling code: 0118
- Police: Thames Valley
- Fire: Royal Berkshire
- Ambulance: South Central
- UK Parliament: Earley and Woodley

Woodley is a town and civil parish in the Borough of Wokingham, in Berkshire, England. Woodley is 4 miles (6.4 km) east of Reading and adjoined to Earley which is 2 miles (3.2 km) to the west of the town and Woodley is 5 miles (8 km) from Wokingham. Nearby are the villages of Sonning, Twyford, Winnersh, Hurst and Charvil.

== Toponymy ==
The name Woodley is derived from Old English words meaning "a clearing in the wood".

== History ==
Woodley was historically part of the ancient parish of Sonning. Woodley was not mentioned in the Domesday Book of 1086. The first written record of the name was in the Register of Saint Osmund, who was Bishop of Salisbury between 1078 and 1099. The document states that St Osmund visited Sonning and says: "Osbertus de Woodleghe holds a dwelling house and yard and is able to pasture his pigs on the Lord of the Manor's woods".

The 1550 Survey of Sonning includes the first modern spelling of the name Woodley. In the west of Woodley, Old Bulmershe Manor once belonged to the Abbey of Reading but was later the home of the Blagrave family and probable birthplace of the 17th-century mathematician, John Blagrave. The adjoining house of Bulmershe Court, otherwise Woodley Lodge, was built in 1777 by James Wheble. Bulmershe (also spelled Bullmarsh) Heath was a marshy area where bulls were pastured. The annual Reading Races were held from 1727 to 1814 on Bulmershe Heath. Horses were entered for the races at The Mitre Tavern in Reading. Owners living in Berkshire, Hampshire, Oxfordshire and Wiltshire could enter horses. The races were advertised in The Reading Mercury newspaper and ran every August. After 1814 they moved to Kings Meadow in Reading. In the 1820 enclosure of lands in Woodley, the two major landowners were James Wheble of Woodley Lodge and Robert Palmer of Holme Park in Sonning. People lost their rights to cut furze for fuel, catch rabbits and pasture their animals on Bulmershe Heath. In compensation, they were given the Poor's Gardens which were allotments on Headley Road.

Woodley Lodge, later known as Bulmershe Court, was bought by Henry Addington, who lived there every summer 1790–1801. He was Speaker of the House of Commons and later 1801–1804 Prime Minister. He was a friend of William Pitt the Younger. Addington was the Captain Commandant of Woodley Yeomanry, a volunteer cavalry regiment formed by gentlemen and wealthy farmers who owned horses. King George III reviewed Woodley Yeomanry on Bulmershe Heath in 1799 and 1805. Addington became Viscount Sidmouth in 1805. He and his wife gave land on which the Royal Berkshire Hospital was built. His name is remembered in Addington Gardens and Addington School in Woodley. In the Second World War the house was used by the US Army. In the 1960s it was demolished and replaced by a teacher training college that subsequently become part of the University of Reading in 1989. The area was sold in 2013/2014 and is now a new housing estate of houses, flats and a care home.

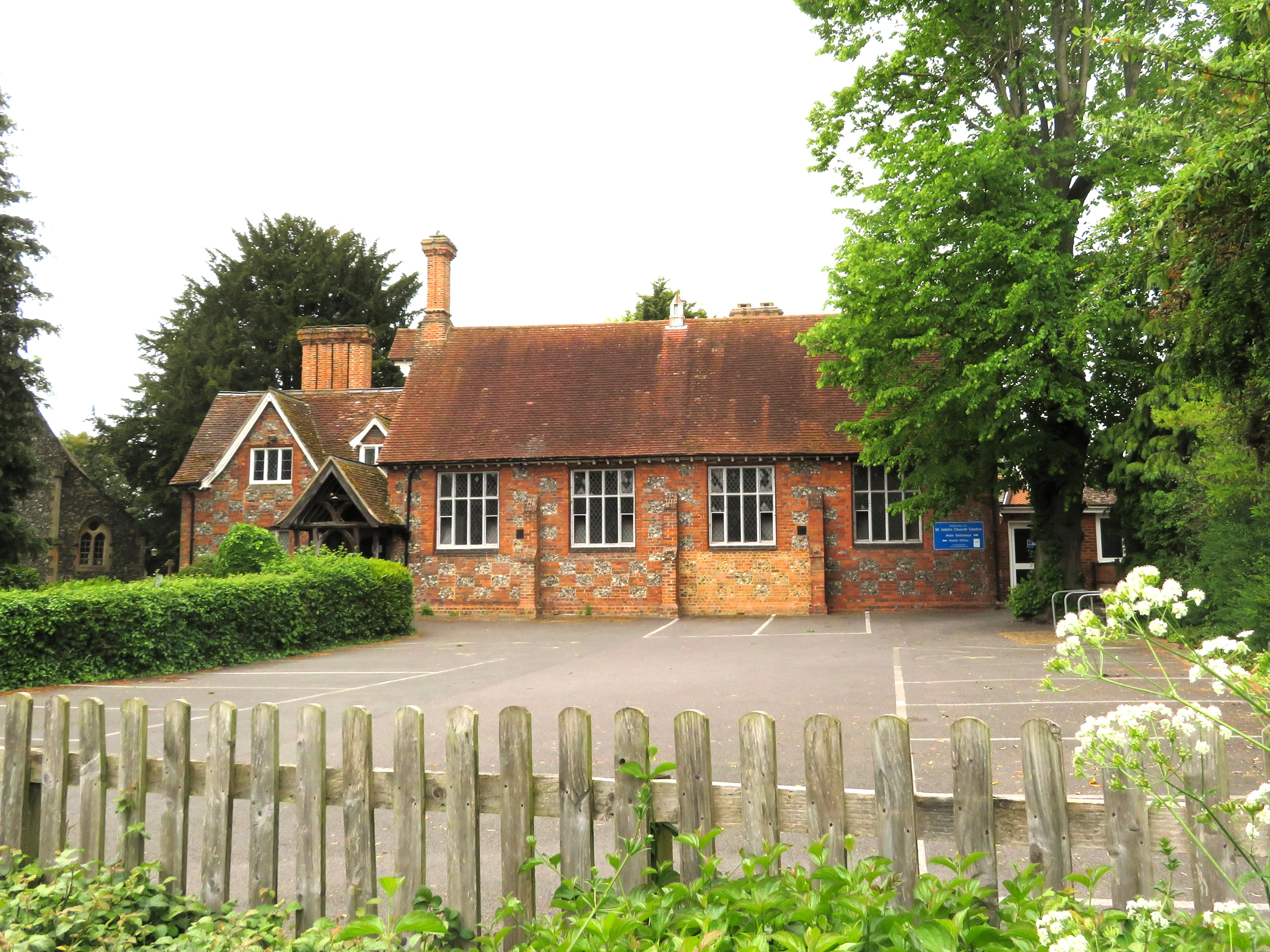
Former village school, Church Road, built 1873, now serves as church hall and office for adjoining St John the Evangelist's Church

The 1847 Kelly's Directory of Berkshire described Woodley as " a scattered village and consists principally of farm houses. James Wheble has a neat residence here called Bulmershe Court. There is a market for fat cattle, held at Loddon Bridge every Monday, which is well attended by butchers from Reading and the vicinity". The directory listed the main farmers, public houses and tradesmen. The pubs were The Bull and Chequers at Woodley Green, The Chequers at Bulmershe Heath, The Lands End and The George at Loddon Bridge.

=== Woodley Aerodrome ===
Until the 1930s Woodley was a village of little significance. In 1929, Woodley Aerodrome was opened in a 100-acre (40 ha) field belonging to Sandford Farm. Jack Phillips and Charles Powis started a business The Phillips and Powis School of Flying, offering flying lessons at 12s 6d each. Pauline Gower, later Commander of the Women's Air Transport Auxiliary, earned her pilot's licence there in September 1930. Flight magazine of 10 May 1933 advertised "Learn to Fly for £37 irrespective of the total number of hours taken" at the P and P School of Flying. The short-lived Berks, Bucks and Oxon Flying Club and the Reading Aero Club were also based at the Aerodrome.

In 1932 F.G. Miles came to Woodley and Charles Powis agreed "to place at Mr Miles' disposal a newly equipped Aircraft Workshop". F.G. Miles was joined by his wife Blossom who was a skilled designer and took an active role in the business. In 1936 his brother George joined the company. Phillips left the company in 1932 and Powis in 1937. The first major success for the company was the Miles Hawk aeroplane, a wooden monoplane which sold for £395. Flying was a hobby for the rich, but this was the most affordable civilian plane of the time. Designed by modernist architect Guy Morgan, the Falcon Hotel was built in 1937 to accommodate visitors and serve as a new accommodation for the Reading Aero Club.

The company name was Phillips and Powis until 1943 when it was changed to Miles Aircraft Ltd. Two of the firm's most famous aeroplanes were the Magister and the Master which were used for basic training of RAF pilots. In the years before the war numerous aviators visited Woodley, including Charles Lindbergh and Amy Johnson; Douglas Bader lost his legs in a flying accident on the airfield in 1931. He was in the RAF and had been forbidden from doing low level stunts because of the danger. He recorded the accident in his log book " Crashed slow-rolling near ground. Bad show". The Reading Mercury reported the eyewitness testimony of Captain R.L. Bateman, who was chief instructor at the Aerodrome "I was in the clubhouse when I heard the machine flying overhead. I looked out and saw that the pilot was about 200 feet above the ground. At the time, his machine was going into a slow roll and I was rather surprised at such a thing with the machine at that height. I do not think that the pilot realised that he was so low. At any rate, as he came off his back he lost height and speed and pancaked into the ground. The engine came away from the machine whilst the machine itself rolled over for some distance. The pilot was extracted within a couple of minutes of his machine touching the ground. We did not know the pilot at Woodley and we have no idea why he came here". Bader was taken to the Royal Berkshire Hospital and operated on by the chief surgeon Mr Joyce. His legs could not be saved and both were amputated. He was fitted with tin legs and had to learn to walk again. Bader became a famous pilot and his story is told in the book and film Reach For The Sky. He was always grateful to the Royal Berkshire Hospital and helped them with fund-raising. In 1956 he returned to Woodley to open The Coronation Hall, the community hall which replaced the old village Hut.

From 1935 a civilian flying school was operated by the Philips and Powis company, where trainees were prepared for service in the RAF. The company won a £2M Air Ministry order for 500 M.9 Master Is on 11 June 1938 and this was Britain's largest order for training aeroplanes at the time and required considerable and urgent expansion of the busy factory later that year. By 1939 Phillips and Powis had 1,000 employees and major extensions to the factory and an impressive new 'art deco' headquarters designed by Guy Morgan were officially opened by Air Minister Sir Kingsley Wood on 27 January 1939. When war broke out that September, the airfield and factory buildings were camouflaged and the grass runways were disguised by false hedges. The nearby 'Eleven Elms' were cut down because it was feared they were a landmark which could identify the Aerodrome. In 1940 the company was awarded a Spitfire repair and service contract and at the height of World War Two there was a 24-hour 7 day working week and 5,000 employees and many dispersed production and storage sites around the local area. The RAF formed No. 10 Flying Instructors' School in 1942 from the former No. 8 Elementary Flying Training School. The aerodrome was bombed three times in 1940 but the damage was minor and there were no deaths.

Around 6,000 civil and military aircraft were built and first flown here from 1933 to 1962 and, in 1939, the Phillips & Powis factory installed Britain's first moving track assembly line for aircraft production, to build the Miles Master advanced training aeroplane. After the Second World War, Woodley continued to grow, with other industries relocating here from Reading. By early the 1960s the aerodrome was little-used and all flying finally ceased soon after the Handley Page (Reading) Ltd aircraft factory closed in 1962–63. After gravel extraction in the 1960s and 70s, aerodrome was redeveloped for housing and light industry by Adwest Properties Ltd in the 1980s. The Adwest Group and its tenants continued to use many of the former Miles aircraft factory buildings into the 21st century. Today, Woodley's aviation heritage is mainly commemorated by the Museum of Berkshire Aviation and also many aviation-related road names on the former aerodrome.

== Governance ==
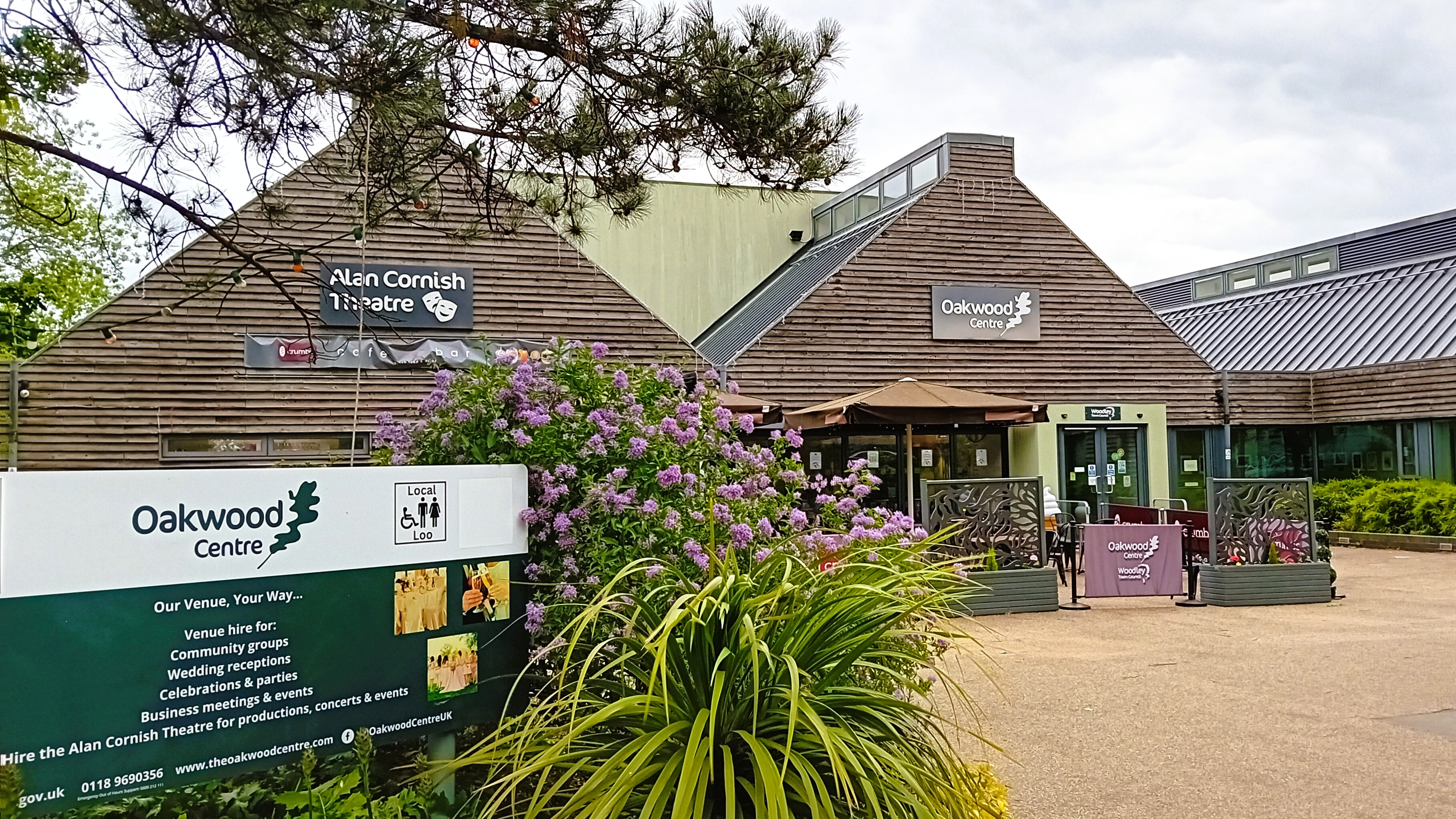
Oakwood Centre, incorporating Alan Cornish Theatre

There are two tiers of local government covering Woodley, at parish (town) and unitary authority level: Woodley Town Council and Wokingham Borough Council. The town council is based at the Oakwood Centre on Headley Road, which was completed in 2004.

For national elections, Woodley forms part of the Earley and Woodley constituency.

=== Administrative history ===
Woodley historically formed part of a township called "Woodley and Sandford" within the extensive parish of Sonning. The township took on civil functions under the poor laws from the 17th century onwards. It therefore also became a civil parish in 1866 when the legal definition of 'parish' was changed to be the areas used for administering the poor laws.

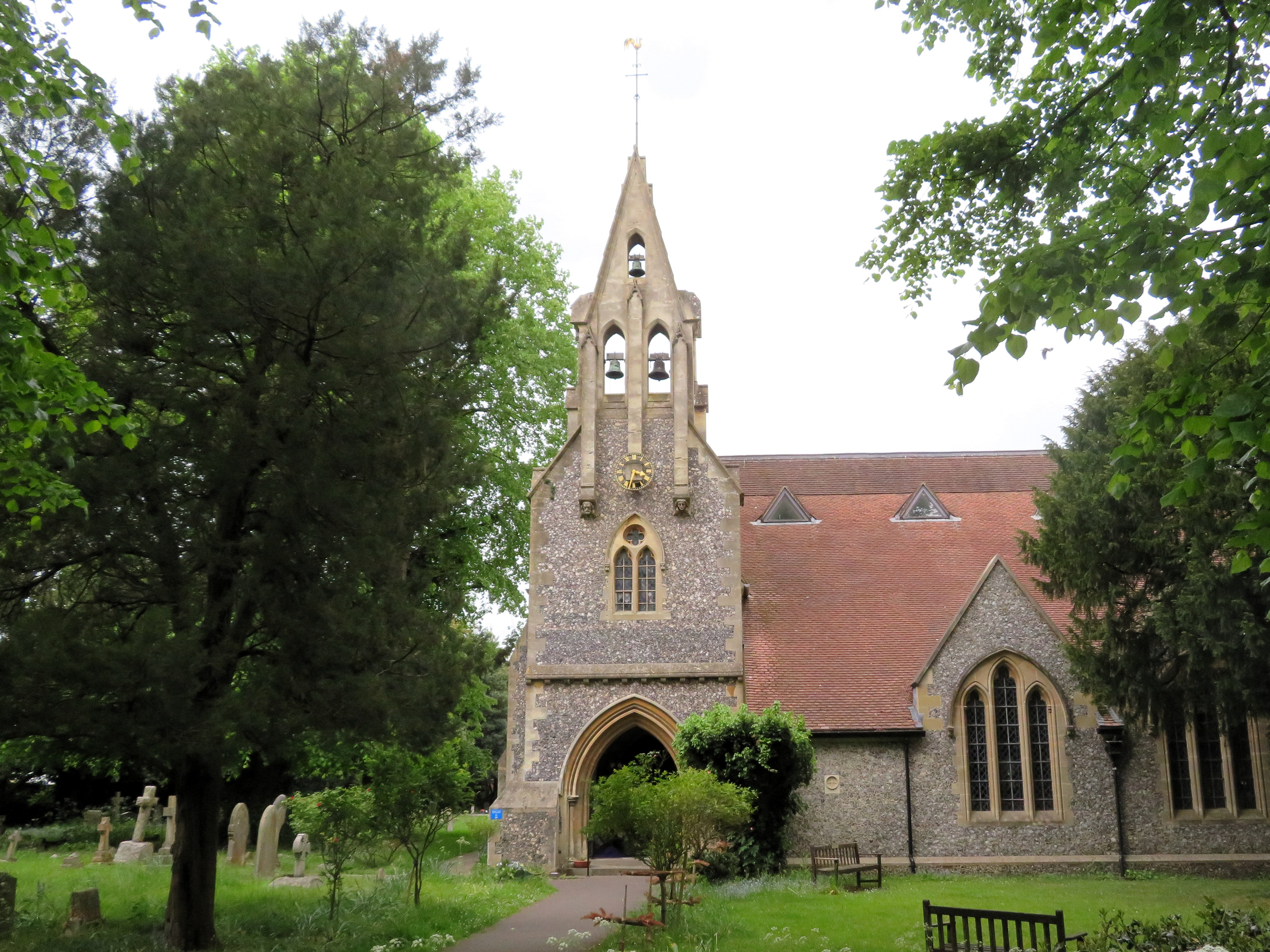
Church of St John the Evangelist, Church Road

In ecclesiastical terms, a church dedicated to St John the Evangelist was built in 1873, initially as a chapel of ease to St Andrew's Church, Sonning. St John's was elevated to formally become a parish church in 1881 when a separate ecclesiastical parish of Woodley was created.

Elected parish and district councils were established under the Local Government Act 1894; Woodley and Sandford was given a parish council and included in the Wokingham Rural District. The civil parish of Woodley and Sandford included Charvil until 1970, when it was made a separate parish.

Ahead of the reforms to local government in 1974 brought in by the Local Government Act 1972, Reading Borough Council campaigned to have Woodley, Earley, and other areas absorbed into the borough of Reading. The government decided to make no change to Reading's boundaries, and placed Woodley in the new Wokingham district instead. As part of the 1974 reforms, parish councils were given the power to declare their parishes to be towns and adopt the style "town council", which Woodley and Sandford Parish Council did that same year. Shortly afterwards, in January 1975, the parish of Woodley and Sandford was renamed just Woodley.

== Landmarks ==
Woodley Congregational church is a Gothic Revival building completed in 1834. It became a United Reformed Church and is now offices. Church of St John the Evangelist was designed by Henry Woodyer, paid for by Robert Palmer of Holme Park and built in 1873.

== Education ==
Woodley has two secondary comprehensive schools that have achieved specialist school status, Waingels College (Mathematics and Computing), and The Bulmershe School (Sports). Primary schools include ones at Highwood, Beechwood, St Dominic's Roman Catholic, Rivermead, Woodley Church of England, Southlake and Willow Bank.

== Geography ==
Woodley has a site of Special Scientific Interest (SSSI) just to the east of the town, called Lodge Wood and Sandford Mill The town has three local nature reserves, and they are called Alder Moors, Highwood and Lavells Lake.

== Sport ==
Woodley's football team is Woodley United F.C. The club was formed in 1904, though it is thought that a team existed in Woodley in the nineteenth century. In 2009, Woodley Town ran three teams in the Reading Football League. The 1st team won the Senior Division in 2008–09 (Step 7 of the FA Football Pyramid System) and the BTC Senior Cup to complete the League and Cup double. It is a FA Charter Standard Development Club. The club runs a youth section, Woodley Town Kestrels, with boys and girls teams from under-7 to under-17 age groups.

Woodley is home to the Kingfisher Table Tennis Club, who play in the Reading & District League and the Bracknell, Wokingham & District League. Kingfisher TTC also participate in the British League. In 2019 Maria Tsaptsinos of Kingfisher won the England championship title. Southlake Angling Society runs the Southlake fishery near Woodley town centre. It was established in the early 1960s on the former estate lake with which it shares its name. The Society has added Redlands, a local lake in Hurst, and a stretch of the River Loddon that flows close to the east of Woodley and Earley. There is a park run in Woodford park every Saturday, and a junior park run every Sunday.

== Notable people ==
- Felix Bowness, comedy actor, best known for ex-jockey Fredd Quilley in Hi-de-Hi!
- James Henry, footballer
- F G & Maxine ('Blossom') Miles, aircraft designers and pilots
- Hamza Riazuddin, Hampshire cricketer
- Irwin Sparkes, vocalist, The Hoosiers
- Chris Tarrant, TV presenter, Who Wants to Be a Millionaire?
- Sam Barratt, footballer
- Tommy Longhurst, vocalist, Only The Poets
- Nelson Abbey, footballer, attended Waingels College
- Jamie Willcox, guitarist, Pure Reason Revolution

== Literature ==
Woodley is a location mentioned in the short ghost story "The Story of a Disappearance and an Appearance" by M.R. James collected in A Thin Ghost and Others in 1919.

== See also ==
- Sonning Cutting on the Great Western Railway north of Woodley

== Sources ==
- Ditchfield, P.H.; Page, W.H., eds. (1923). A History of the County of Berkshire, Volume 3. Victoria County History. London. pp. 210–225.
- Pevsner, Nikolaus (1966). Berkshire. The Buildings of England. Harmondsworth: Penguin Books. p. 311.
