= St John the Evangelist Church, Woodley =

St John's, Woodley
- St John the Evangelist, Woodley
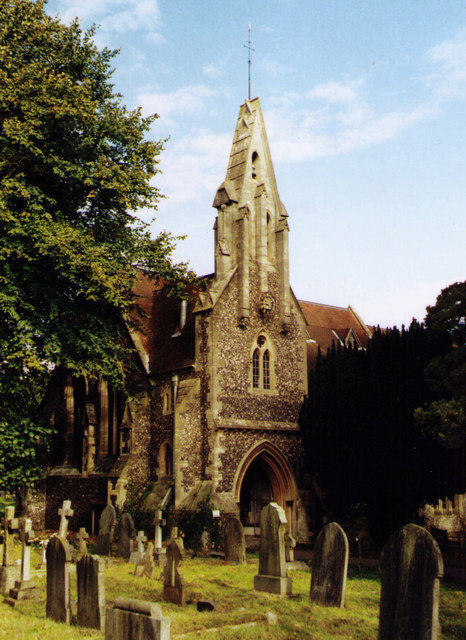
- St John's, Woodley
- 51.4570°N 0.8955°W
- OS grid reference: SU 76839 73692
- Location: Berkshire
- Country: England
- Denomination: Church of England
- Website: www.stjohnswoodley.com

History
- Status: Parish church
- Founded: 1873
- Founder: Robert Palmer

Architecture
- Functional status: Active
- Heritage designation: Grade II*
- Designated: 26 January 1967
- Architect: Henry Woodyer

Administration
- Diocese: Anglican Diocese of Oxford
- Archdeaconry: Archdeaconry of Berkshire
- Deanery: Reading
- Parish: Woodley, St John the Evangelist

Clergy
- Vicar: Rev. Mark Nam 甄英深
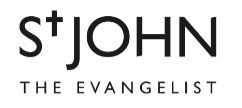

St John the Evangelist, Woodley, is a parish church in Woodley, close to Reading in the English county of Berkshire. It is a Church of England church in the Reading Deanery of the Diocese of Oxford.

The church was built by Robert Palmer in 1873. In 1987 an extension was added to the south-east wall. Adjacent to the church is the St John's Centre, a Grade II listed building which was formerly a Church of England school but is now used as the church hall and office. Across the road from the church is the Vicarage.

== Ministers ==
| Name | Appointed | Position |
|---|---|---|
| Rev. Mark Nam 甄英深 | 2024 | Vicar |
| Rev. Edilberto (Eddie) Marquez | 2008 | Priest-in-Charge/Vicar |
| Rev. Jon Honour | 2006 | Acting Priest-in-Charge |
| Rev. Ann Douglas | 2002 | Team Rector |
| Rev. Fred Woods | 1995 | Team Rector |
| Rev. Ian Watson | 1989 | Vicar/Team Rector |
| Rev. John Congdon | 1983 | Vicar |
| Rev. John Eastgate | 1974 | Vicar |
| Rev. H. W. H. Wilkinson | 1948 | Vicar |
| Rev. K.F. Way | 1945 | Vicar |
| Rev. W. H. Trebble | 1940 | Vicar |
| Rev. Cyril Donne | 1930 | Vicar |
| Rev. Philip Gray | 1925 | Vicar |
| Rev. Frederick F. Penruddock | 1913 | Vicar |
| Rev. Ernest Angel Gray | 1881 | Vicar |

== Parish of Woodley ==
Originally part of the Parish of Sonning, Woodley became its own Parish in 1881. In the 1960s St James' Church, Woodley was planted and came under the authority of St John's Church, being led by a curate until 1992.

While Ian Watson was Vicar, St John's Church planted Emmanuel Church, Woodley in 1991 by employing a Church Army couple called Richard & Mandy Priestley.

The following year, 1992, saw the one parish of Woodley become two parishes within a Team Ministry. The Parish of St John the Evangelist contained St John's Church and Emmanuel Church, whilst the new Parish of Southlake contained St James Church with the curate at the time, Rev. Paul Roberts becoming a Team Vicar. The Team Rector based at St John the Evangelist Church led the team of clergy for both parishes.

Woodley Airfield Church was planted jointly by St John's Church and Christ Church in 1993. Airfield Church is ecumenical, having Church of England, Methodist, and URC leadership.

Following the controversial departure of the Rev. Ann Douglas in 2006, the Benefice of Woodley was suspended in order that the future of the Team Ministry could be reviewed. During the interregnum the Rev. Jon Honour, Team Vicar at Emmanuel Church, was appointed Acting Priest-in-Charge of St John's Church, assisted by the then curate, the Rev. Jason Reid.

In 2007, the PCCs of St Johns and St James independently voted to dissolve the Team Ministry and establish a Group Ministry in its place. Rev. Marquez was licensed as Priest in Charge in March 2008.

The induction of Rev. Mark Nam as Vicar for St John's Church happened in May 2024.

All three Anglican Churches in Woodley are part of Churches Together in Woodley.
