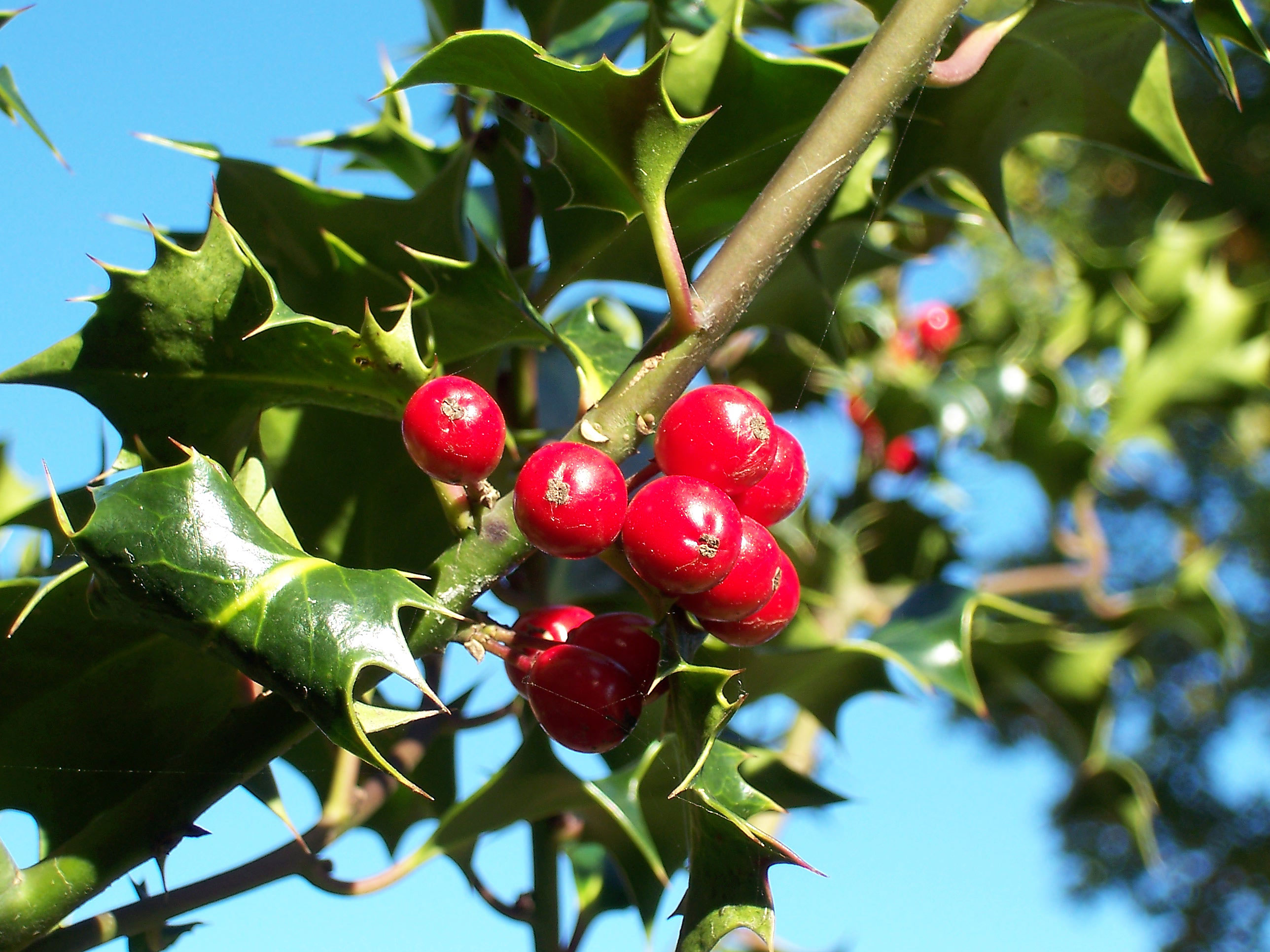
- Leaves and fruit

Conservation status
- Least Concern (IUCN 3.1)

Scientific classification
- Kingdom: Plantae
- Clade: Tracheophytes
- Clade: Angiosperms
- Clade: Eudicots
- Clade: Asterids
- Order: Aquifoliales
- Family: Aquifoliaceae
- Genus: Ilex
- Species: I. aquifolium

Binomial name
- Ilex aquifolium L.
- Distribution map

= Ilex aquifolium =

Species of flowering plant in the holly family

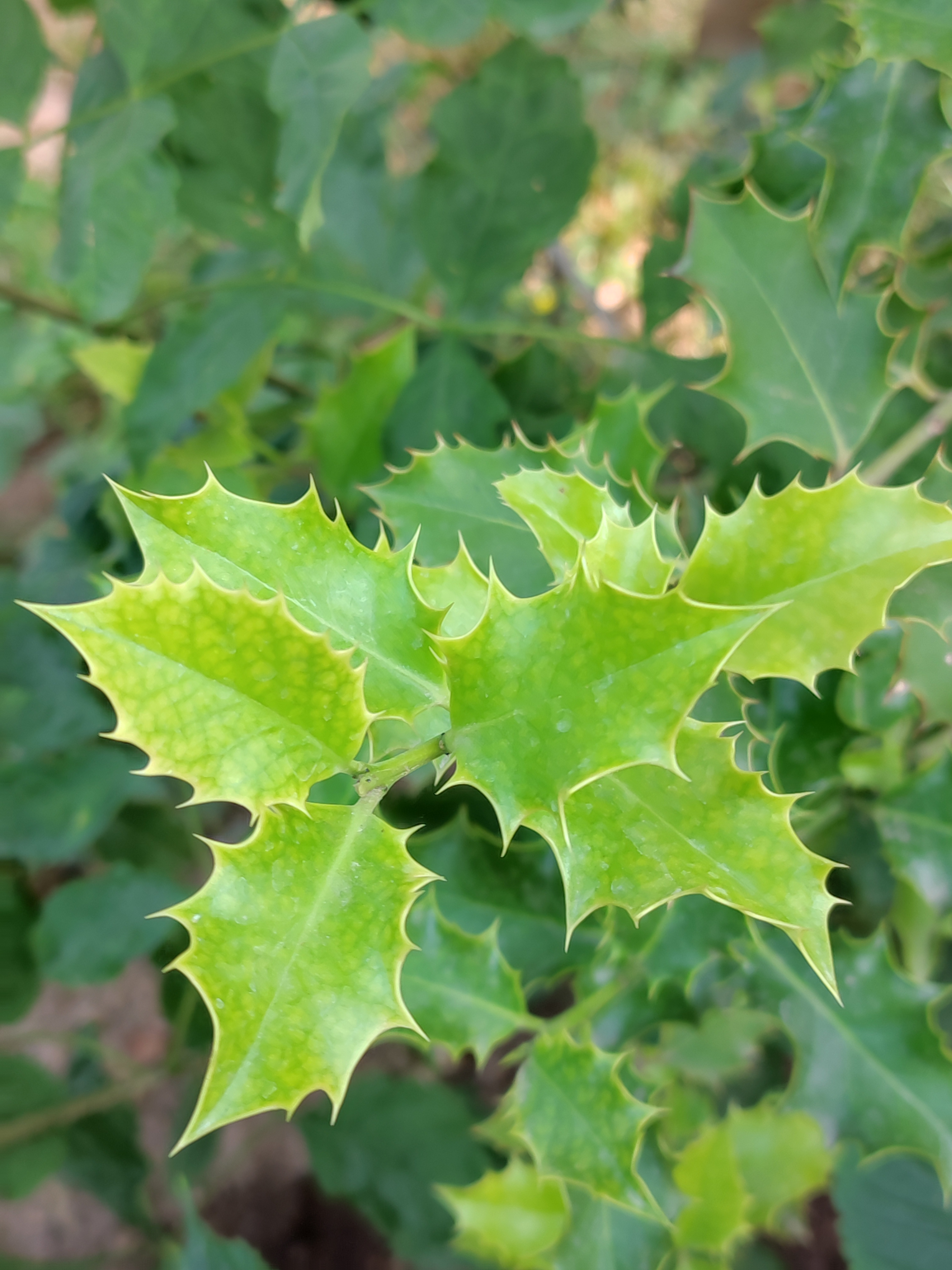
Ilex aquifolium

Ilex aquifolium, the holly, common holly, English holly, European holly, or occasionally Christmas holly, is a species of flowering plant in the family Aquifoliaceae, native to western and southern Europe, northwest Africa, and southwest Asia. It is regarded as the type species of the genus Ilex, which by association is also called holly. It is an evergreen tree or shrub found, for example, in shady areas of forests of oak and in beech hedges. In the British Isles it is one of very few native hardwood evergreen trees. It has a great capacity to adapt to different conditions and is a pioneer species that repopulates the margins of forests or clearcuts.

European holly can exceed 15 m in height, but is often found at much smaller heights, typically 2–3 m (6.6–9.8 ft) tall and broad, with a straight trunk and pyramidal crown, branching from the base. It grows slowly and does not usually fully mature due to cutting or fire. It is estimated to live as long as 300 years.

European holly is the species of holly long associated with Christmas, and previously the Roman festival of Saturnalia. Its glossy green prickly leaves and bright red berries (produced only by the female plant) are represented in wreaths, garlands and cards wherever Christmas is celebrated. It is a subject of music and folklore, especially in the British tradition. It is also a popular ornamental shrub or hedge, with numerous cultivars in a range of colours.

== Description ==
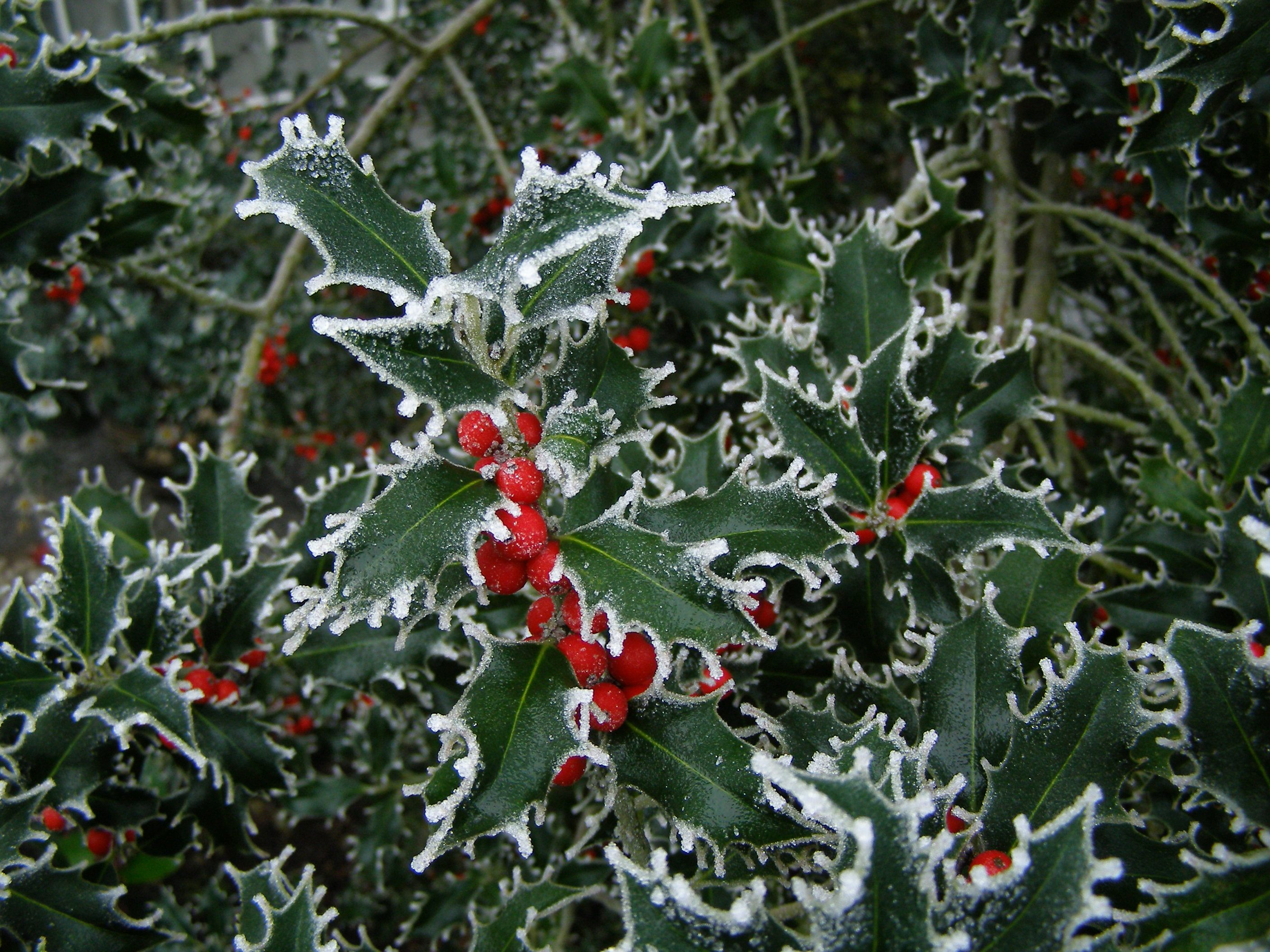
Frosted foliage and berries

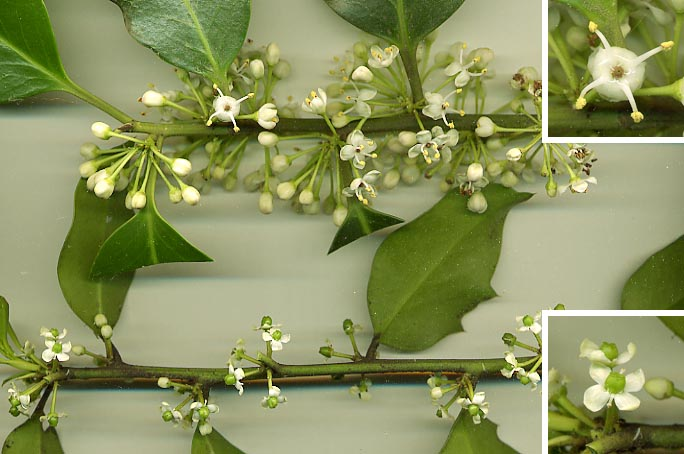
European holly flowers; male above, female below (leaves cut to show flowers more clearly)

In exceptional cases European holly can grow to 24 m (79 ft) in height, but more typically is 3 to 15 m (10 to 49 ft) tall and often only grows into a shrub rather than reaching tree stature. It has a woody stem as wide as 40–80 cm (16–31 in), rarely 100 cm (39 in) or more, in diameter. The bark is smooth and silver-grey, but with age will develop small fissures. The root system is a fibrous mat near the surface with only a few roots that descend to greater depths. In dense stands the roots will spread only about as wide as the branches. Holly trees only rarely produce suckers, but those that do can produce a clump of stems. Lower branches that become buried in dead leaves can also sometimes root. The botanist William Dallimore estimated the maximum lifespan of the holly at 250 to 300 years.

The leaves are 5–12 cm long and can be as narrow as one-third the overall length; they are evergreen, and though they can last for as much as eight years less than five is more typical. In the upper canopy of trees exposed to full sun leaves fall after just one or two years. Most leaves are shed during middle of winter, though some fall during all seasons of the year, with the oldest leaves falling first unless disturbed by drought. They are dark and shining green on the upper surface and lighter on the underside, their shape is ovate to oblong-elliptic, broader at the base and rounded like the outline of an egg to somewhat rectangular with curving sides. The edges of the leaves can be scalloped with sharp spines crowning each tooth or smooth with just one at the leaf tip. Older trees and those in shaded environments tend to have the most smooth edged leaves, especially in upper parts of these trees. In rare cases, a tree may lack spines even on its lower leaves. When present, leaves can have as many as six to eight spines on each side of the leaf.

The flowers are white, sometimes touched with red, and have four parts such as petal lobes, though rarely they can have five. Holly is usually dioecious, meaning that flowers that produce fruit and flowers that produce pollen are on separate trees. When under 1.5 m (5 ft) hollies rarely produce flowers or fruit and when taller than 3 m (10 ft) most will flower. Though spring is the standard time for flowering, individual trees have been known to bloom in winter as late as January.

The fruit only appears on female plants, which require male plants nearby to fertilise them. The fruit is a drupe (stone fruit), about 6–10 mm in diameter, a bright red or bright yellow, which matures around October or November; at this time they are very bitter due to the ilicin content and so are rarely eaten until late winter after frost has made them softer and more palatable. They are eaten by rodents, birds and larger herbivores. Each fruit contains 3 to 4 seeds which typically germinate in the second or third spring.

== Taxonomy ==
Ilex aquifolium was given its scientific name in 1753 by Linnaeus. He placed it in the genus Ilex which is classified in the family Aquifoliaceae. It is also designated as the type for the genus, the species that defines its genus.

The genus Ilex was originally the Latin name for the holly oak (Quercus ilex). The species epithet, aquifolium, is Botanical Latin of disputed origin. Christenhusz states that it is from the Latin acus meaning needle and folia meaning leaf, whereas Merriam-Webster states that it is derived from acer, sharp, and folium, leaf. Several Romance languages use various descendants of Latin acrifolium, literally "sharp leaf", hence Italian agrifoglio, Occitan grefuèlh, etc.; the usual Latin form of the word, used as the species name of the European holly, was aquifolium (literally "pointy leaf", understood as coming from the same root as acutus), but acrifolium is thought to have been the original form.

More than 100 botanical varieties of Ilex aquifolium have been described by botanists, but none of them are accepted names according to Plants of the World Online (POWO). Together with 23 species and other names it has a total of 145 synonyms, though for brevity none of the varieties or forms of I. aquifolium are presented here.

Table of synonyms
Name	Year	Rank	Notes
Aquifolium croceum Raf.	1838	species	= het.
Aquifolium ferox Mill. ex Rafin.	1838	species	= het.
Aquifolium heterophyllum Raf.	1838	species	= het.
Aquifolium ilex Scop.	1771	species	= het.
Aquifolium lanceolatum Raf.	1838	species	= het.
Aquifolium planifolium Raf.	1838	species	= het.
Aquifolium spinosum Lam.	1779	species	= het.
Aquifolium undulatum Raf.	1838	species	= het.
Aquifolium vulgare St.-Lag.	1880	species	= het.
Ilex balearica Desf.	1809	species	= het.
Ilex balearica var. cordata Göpp.	1852	variety	= het.
Ilex chrysocarpa Wender.	1828	species	= het.
Ilex ciliata A.Vilm.	1860	species	= het.
Ilex citriocarpa Murr	1912	species	= het.
Ilex crassifolia Aiton ex Steud.	1840	species	= het.
Ilex echinata Mill.	1768	species	= het.
Ilex ferox (Aiton) Reider	1835	species	= het.
Ilex fischeri Carrière	1887	species	= het.
Ilex maderensis Willd.	1814	species	= het., nom. illeg.
Ilex myrtifolia var. aureomaculata Van Geert	1875	variety	= het.
Ilex nigricans (Göpp.) A.Henry	1913	species	= het.
Ilex perado subsp. iberica (Loes.) S.Andrews	1984	subspecies	= het.
Ilex perado var. iberica Loes.	1901	variety	= het.
Ilex platyphylla Booth	1854	species	= het.
Ilex sempervirens Salisb.	1796	species	= het.
Ilex vulgaris Gray	1821	species	≡ hom., nom. superfl.
Notes: ≡ homotypic synonym; = heterotypic synonym

=== Names ===
The name holly can be used to mean any species in the genus Ilex, but originally referred to Ilex aquifolium and continues to be used to mean this species particularly in addition to names such as European holly. Holly is a shortened form of the Old English holegn or holen. In Scotland holly is still sometimes called by the older names hollin or hollen. The Middle English usage of hollin also became a name for a grove of holly trees, especially one that was regularly cut for to feed domestic animals and it is part of some place names in England. It is also known by the common names common holly and English holly. Both Ilex aquifolium and the North American Ilex opaca are occasionally called Christmas holly.

Smooth leaved holly is known as free holly or slike holly in Shropshire. Locally, it has been known as holm, holme, or home in West Devon and Cornwall.

== Distribution and habitat ==
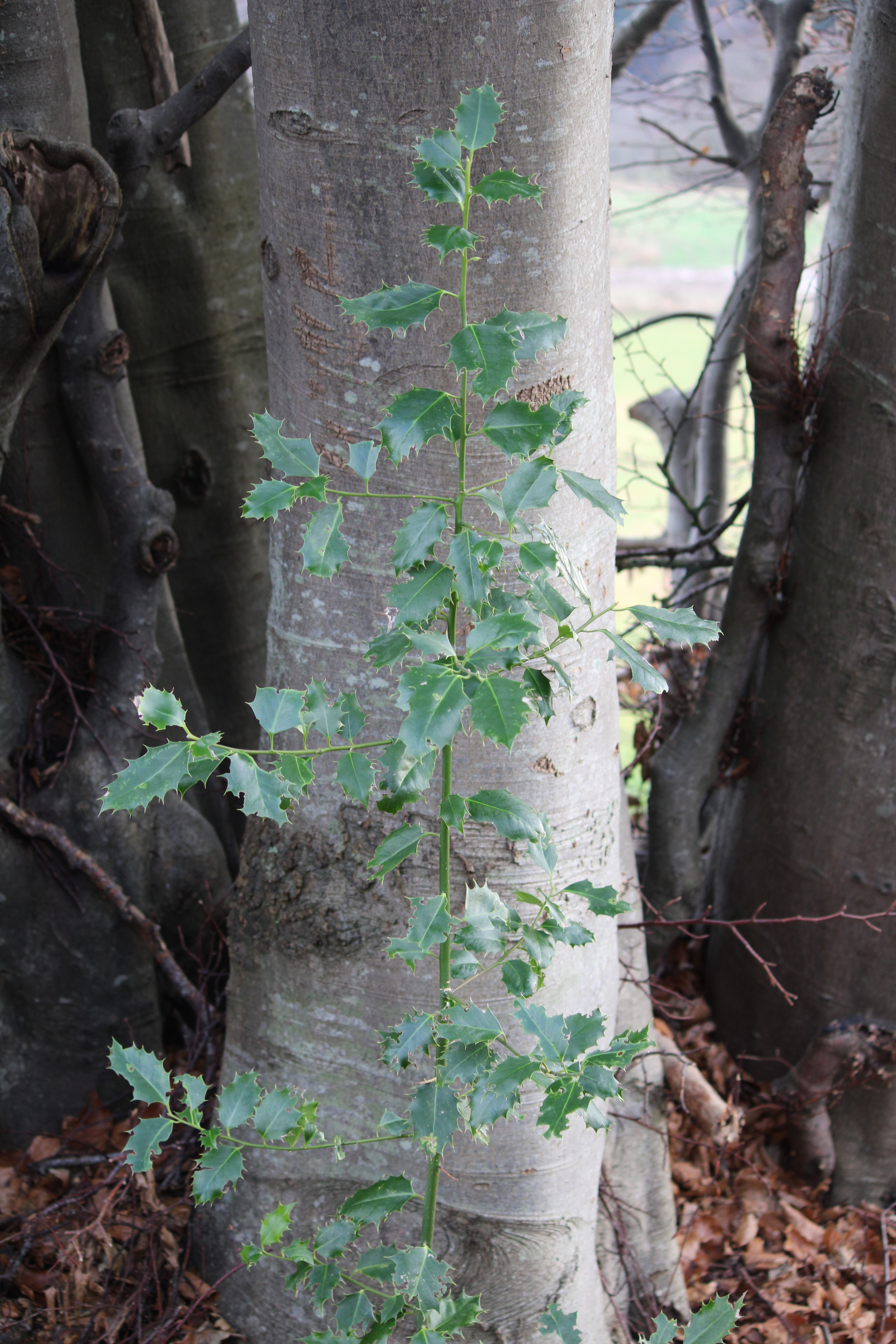
Ilex aquifolium during winter growing next to a beech near Frederikshavn, Denmark

Holly is native to much of the western half of Europe as well as northwestern Africa. Its native status in central and Eastern Europe is disputed. According to Plants of the World Online (POWO) it is not native or reproducing in Poland or Hungary, but is native to Bulgaria and Romania. According to the International Union for Conservation of Nature (IUCN) its status in Romania is uncertain and it is introduced and naturalized to some extant in Hungary, though they agree that it is not found in Poland or eastward in northern Europe. In response to climate change the species is shifting northwards in Norway and towards to the northeast in Denmark and Germany. By 2005 it was found as far north as Kristiansund in Norway, though still limited to a fringe of the county immediately adjacent to the North Sea.

In Asia its status is disputed with POWO listing it as an introduced species in Turkey and Syria while the IUCN lists it as native and also native to Iran and Lebanon. Holly grows from sea level to elevations as high as 600 m (2,000 ft).

Holly is a common species in its range and widespread. Because of this it is a species of least-concern according to the IUCN, however there is a decline in mature individuals and its population is severely fragmented. Though, local populations may face threats. In the country of Sweden only one wild tree remains.

It mainly grows in the understory or at the edges of deciduous forests in oceanic or Mediterranean climates, though in Mediterranean climate areas it only grows at higher elevations in shade and it can be the dominant species in cooler northern woodlands. In the north of its range, holly is associated with oak forests dominated by European oak, durmast oak, and downy oak.

Along the west coast of the United States and Canada, from California to British Columbia, non-native English Holly has proven very invasive, quickly spreading into native forest habitat, where it thrives in shade and crowds out native species. It is listed as a class C noxious weed in Washington State, and is a Class C invasive plant in Portland.

During the Cenozoic Era, the Mediterranean region, Europe, and northwest Africa had a wetter climate and were largely covered by laurel forests. Holly was a typical representative species of this biome, where many current species of the genus Ilex were present. With the drying of the Mediterranean Basin during the Pliocene, the laurel forests gradually retreated, replaced by more drought-tolerant sclerophyll plant communities. The modern Ilex aquifolium resulted from this change. Most of the last remaining laurel forests around the Mediterranean are believed to have died out approximately 10,000 years ago at the end of the Pleistocene.

== Ecology ==
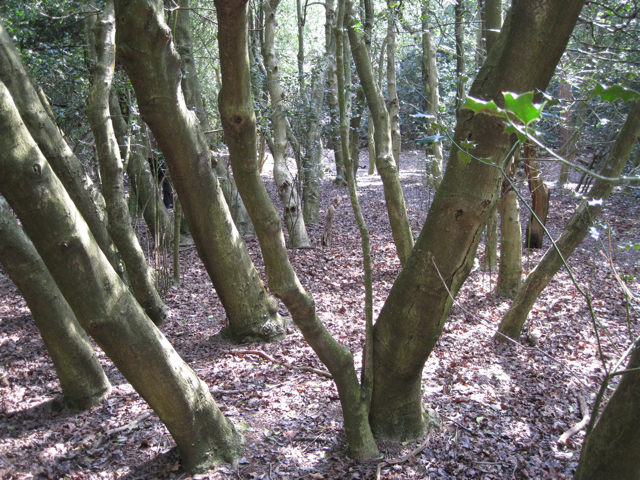
Holly thicket in the West midlands, England.

Holly is a rugged pioneer species that prefers relatively moist areas, and tolerates frost as well as summer drought. With its spiny leaves it can form a dense thicket that defends other woody species from herbivores aiding the regeneration of forests. The plant is common in the garrigue and maquis and is also found in deciduous forest and oak forest.

Pure stands of hollies can grow into a labyrinth of vaults in which thrushes and deer take refuge, while smaller birds are protected among their spiny leaves. After the first frost of the season, holly fruits become soft and fall to the ground serving as important food in its native regions for winter birds at a time of scarce resources.

The flowers are attractive as nectar sources for insects such as bees, wasps, flies, and small butterflies. The commonly-encountered pale patches on leaves are due to the leaf-mine insect Phytomyza ilicis.

It is an invasive species on the West Coast of Canada and the United States as well as in Hawaii.

Holly is well known in epigenetics. Some cultivars have smooth leaf edges, or both smooth and prickly leaf edges on the same plant. In response to stress these cultivars can produce leaves with more prickles.

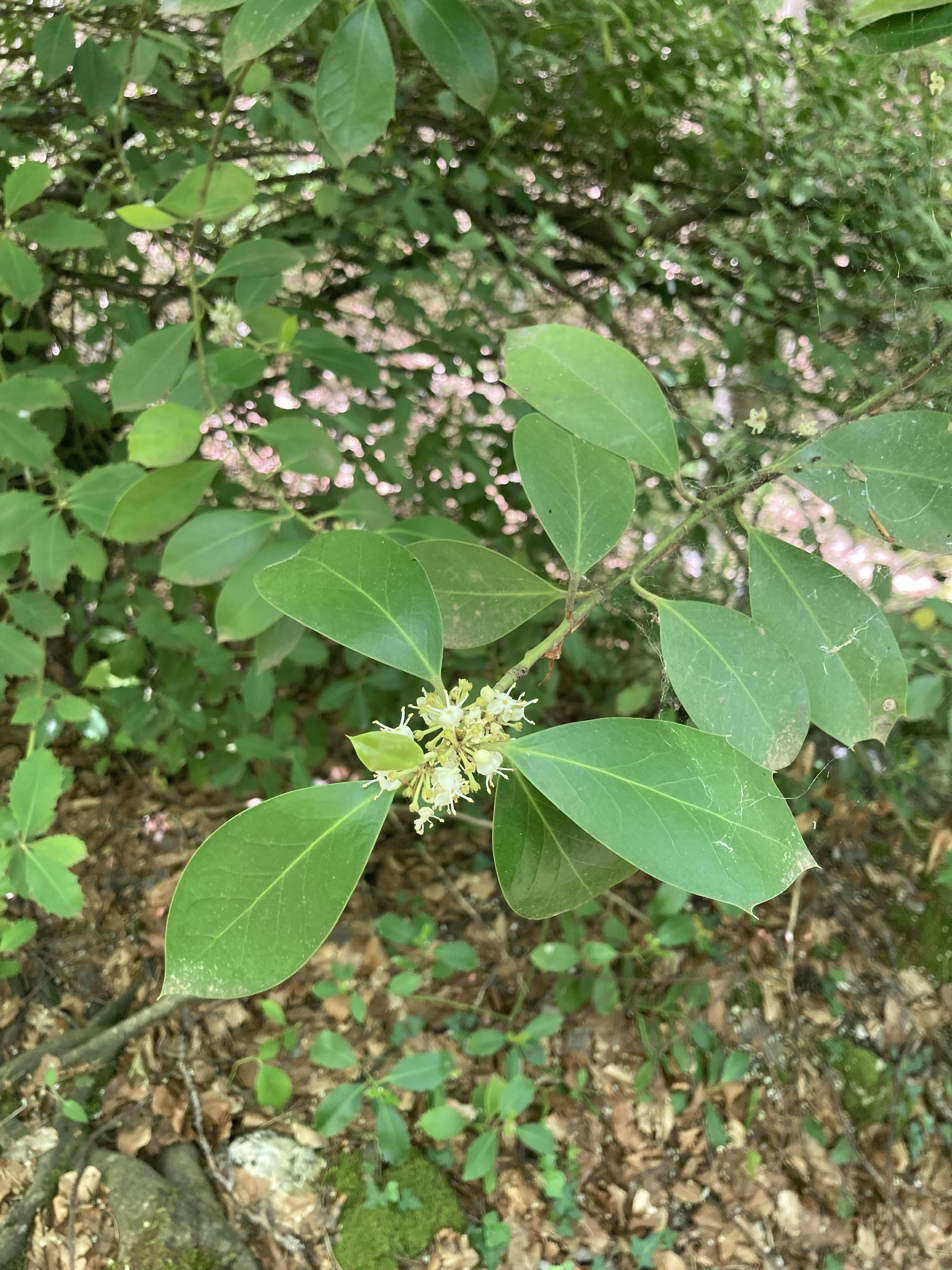
European Holly with smooth leaves found on Mount Olympus.

== Cultivation ==
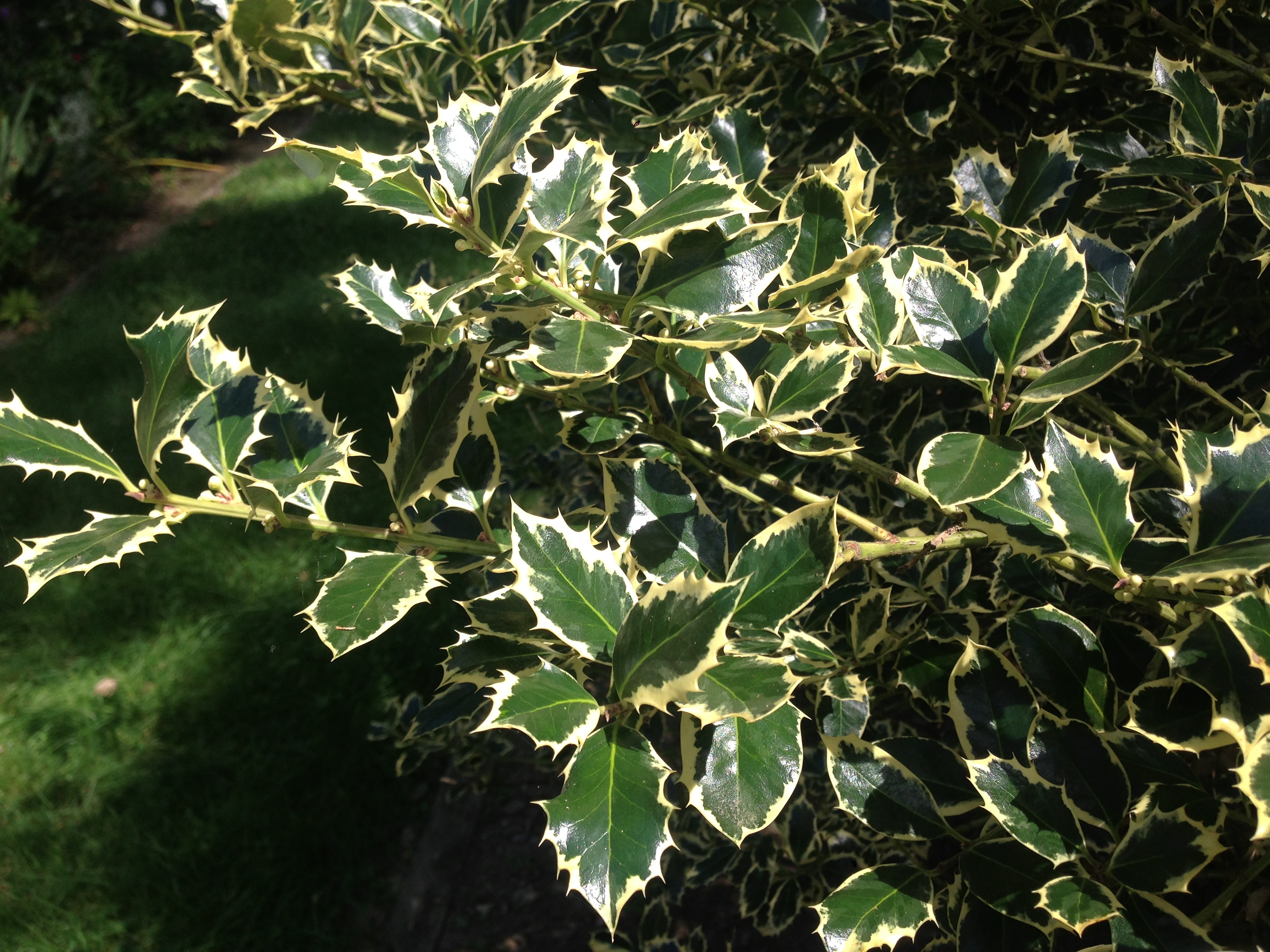
One of several variegated cultivars

Ilex aquifolium is widely grown in parks and gardens in temperate regions. Hollies are often used for hedges; the spiny leaves make them difficult to penetrate, and they take well to pruning and shaping. Holly can grow in a wide variety of difficult soils including clay, acidic, and nutrient poor soils, but is intollerant of poor drainage. In wet conditions it is likely to have problems such as root rot, canker, or leaf blight.

=== AGM cultivars ===
Numerous cultivars have been selected, of which the following have gained the Royal Horticultural Society's Award of Garden Merit:

- I. aquifolium
- 'Amber' (female)
- 'Argentea Marginata'
- 'Ferox Argentea'
- 'Golden Queen'
- 'Handsworth New Silver'
- 'J.C. van Tol'
- 'Madame Briot'
- 'Pyramidalis'
- 'Silver Queen'

=== Ilex × altaclerensis ===
The hybrid Ilex × altaclerensis was developed at Highclere Castle in Hampshire, England, in 1835, a cross between I. aquifolium and the tender species I. perado. The following cultivars have gained the RHS AGM:

- 'Belgica Aurea'
- 'Camelliifolia'
- 'Golden King'
- 'Lawsoniana'

== Chemistry and toxicity ==
Holly berries contain alkaloids, theobromine, saponins, caffeic acid, and a yellow pigment, ilixanthin. The berries are generally regarded as toxic to humans.

== Uses ==
As early as the 1200s and into the first part of the 1700s Ilex aquifolium was cultivated for use as winter fodder for many domestic animals. Sheep were most frequently fed holly, but horses and cattle were also given it and branches were cut down for red deer. This practice is best documented in southern areas of the Pennines near Sheffield, but might have been more widespread in Britain and there are a few instances of it recorded in northwest France. The smooth leaves were specifically selected to be cut in at least some instances. Though the practice is much rarer, branches are still cut for sheep or cattle in Dumfries, Derbyshire, Cumbria, and in the New Forest. It was also practiced in Ireland until the middle of the twentieth century.

The wood of the holly is hard and white with a slight grey or green tinge and without a noticeable heartwood. It is fine-grained and quite heavy. It is difficult to dry and is often cut into small pieces avoid problems with it warping. It is used for wood inlay, small fancy carving, or small turned pieces. It is easily stained black and is occasionally substituted for ebony. In the 1800s holly was extensively used, and considered the best material, for making driving whips for horse-drawn carriages. Although popular stories suggest that holly and other locally produced woods were used to make Great Highland bagpipes, the evidence shows that it was always made using imported woods in the lowlands.

Holly, like ash trees, makes a desirable firewood due to being flammable while still green.

The leaves are prepared as a tea, though rarely, as a folk medicine for pain relief in the Pallars region in the mountains of northwestern Catalonia.

=== In culture ===
In the British Isles common holly has been used in rituals and as a symbol both before and after the coming of Christianity in similar ways to the use of evergreen plants during midwinter in many cultures. Branches of holly continue to be used in place of palm fronds on Palm Sunday in some areas of Europe. It is also often used in Christmas decorations, particularly in Britain, its evergreen leaves a symbol of life continuing during the winter season. Though there is no traditional prohibition against cutting boughs or twigs, cutting down a holly tree is believed to bring bad luck. Like other spiny plants, the common holly is believed to protect against malicious witchcraft. On the fells in Lancashire, branches of holly are placed in new buildings or where an animal has died by superstitious people. A similar practice in France is to hang a branch of holly above animal pens to keep away ringworm.

The name of the hamlet of Hulver in Suffolk is the same as the Middle English name of the species, though in 1997 there were only 18 holly trees there. There is a similar lack of the namesake trees in Hollybush near the border between Worcestershire and Herefordshire.
