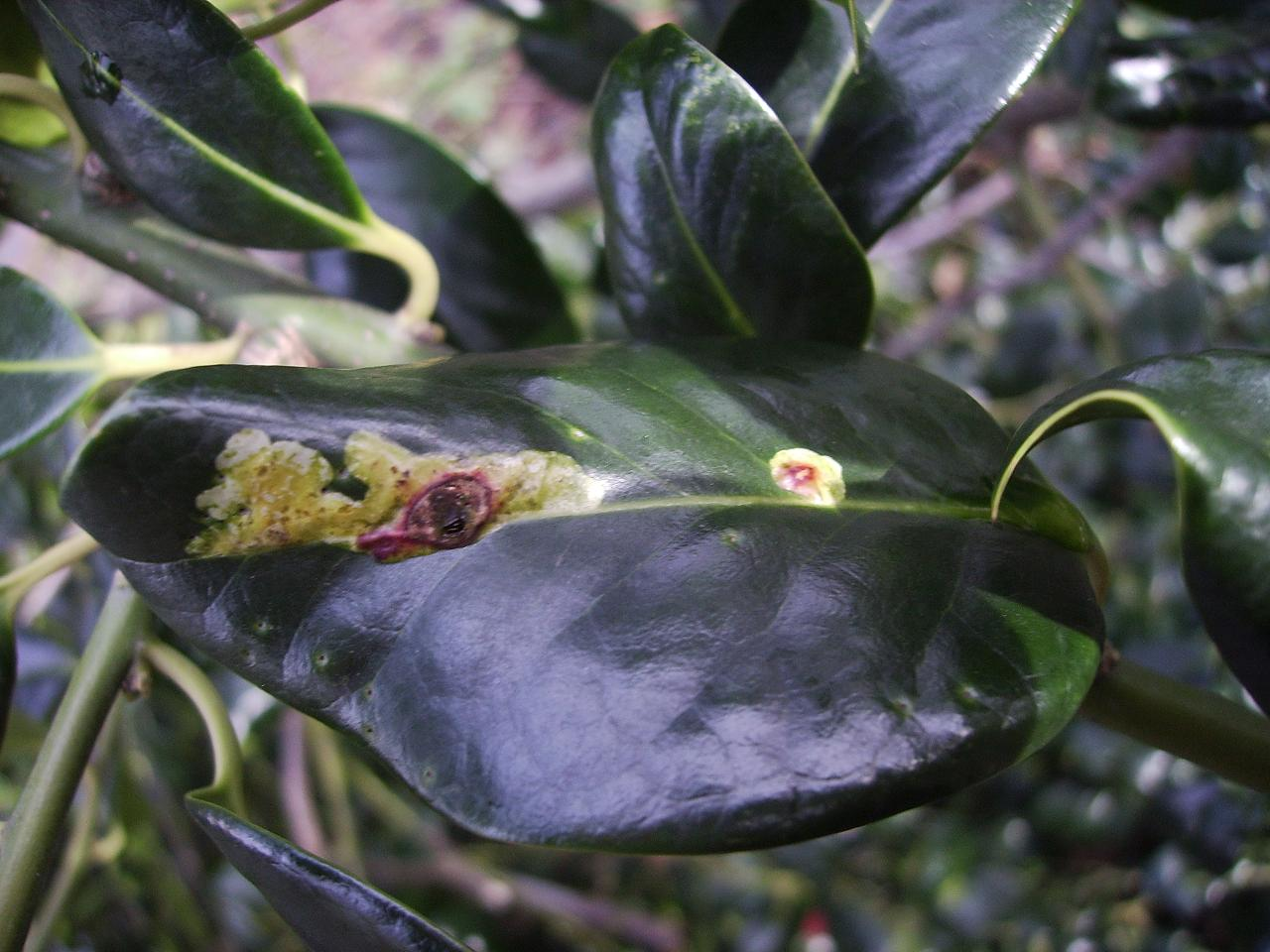
- Holly leaf miner damage to leaf

Scientific classification
- Kingdom: Animalia
- Phylum: Arthropoda
- Clade: Pancrustacea
- Class: Insecta
- Order: Diptera
- Family: Agromyzidae
- Genus: Phytomyza
- Species: P. ilicis

Binomial name
- Phytomyza ilicis (Curtis, 1846)

= Phytomyza ilicis =

Species of insect

Phytomyza ilicis, the holly leaf miner, is a leaf mining fly in the family Agromyzidae, whose larvae burrow into leaves of the holly tree (Ilex aquifolium) leaving characteristic pale trails or leaf mines.

== Description ==
Adults of P. ilicis are small with a wing length measuring 2.5–3 millimetres (0.098–0.118 in). They have red eyes and 6–8 pairs of acrostichal bristles on the thorax.

Larvae are pale, leg-less maggots lacking a head capsule and thoracic and abdominal legs like most fly larvae. The dark-brown coloured puparium is formed from the hardened last larval skin.

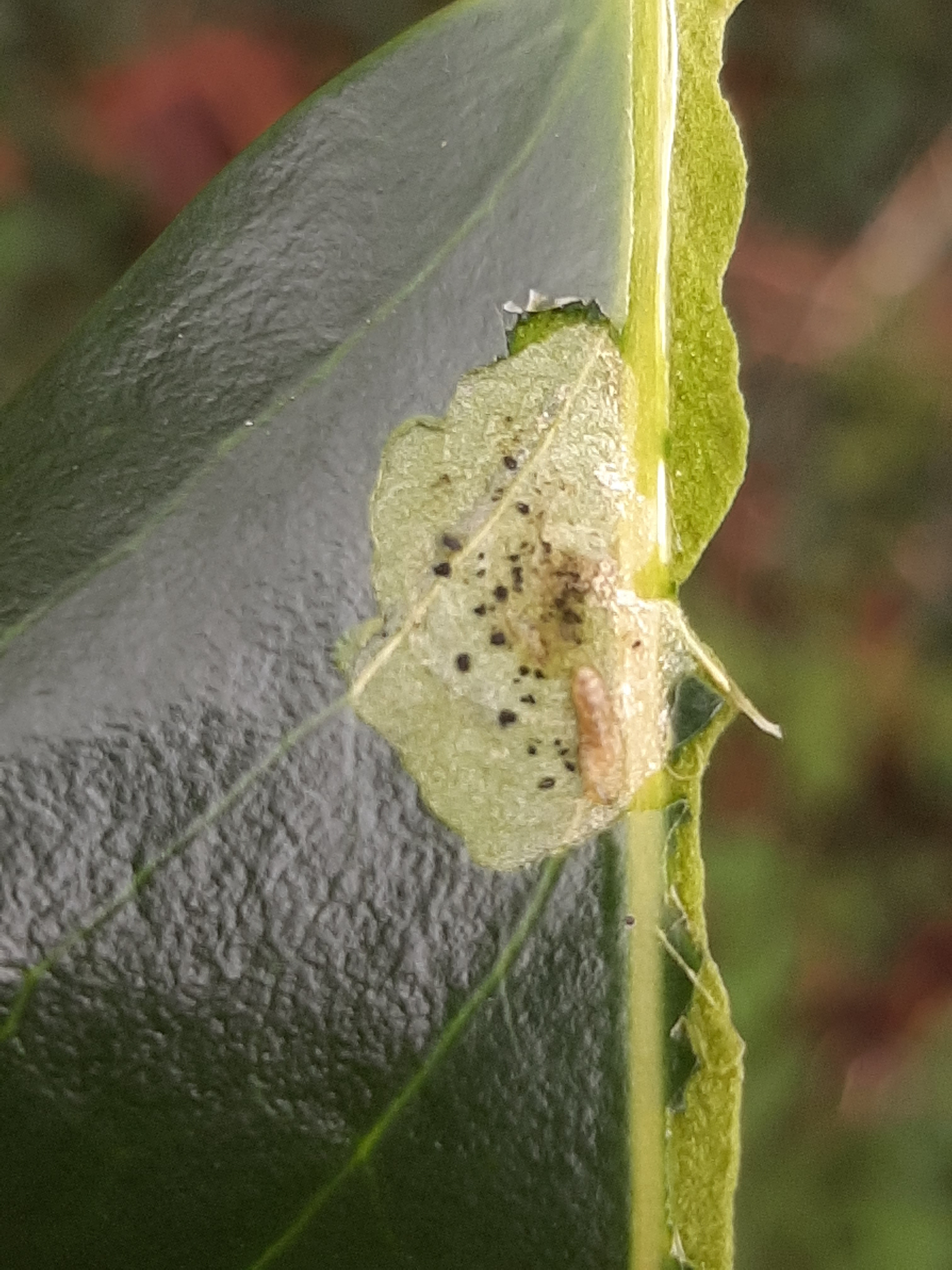
A larva exposed in its mine

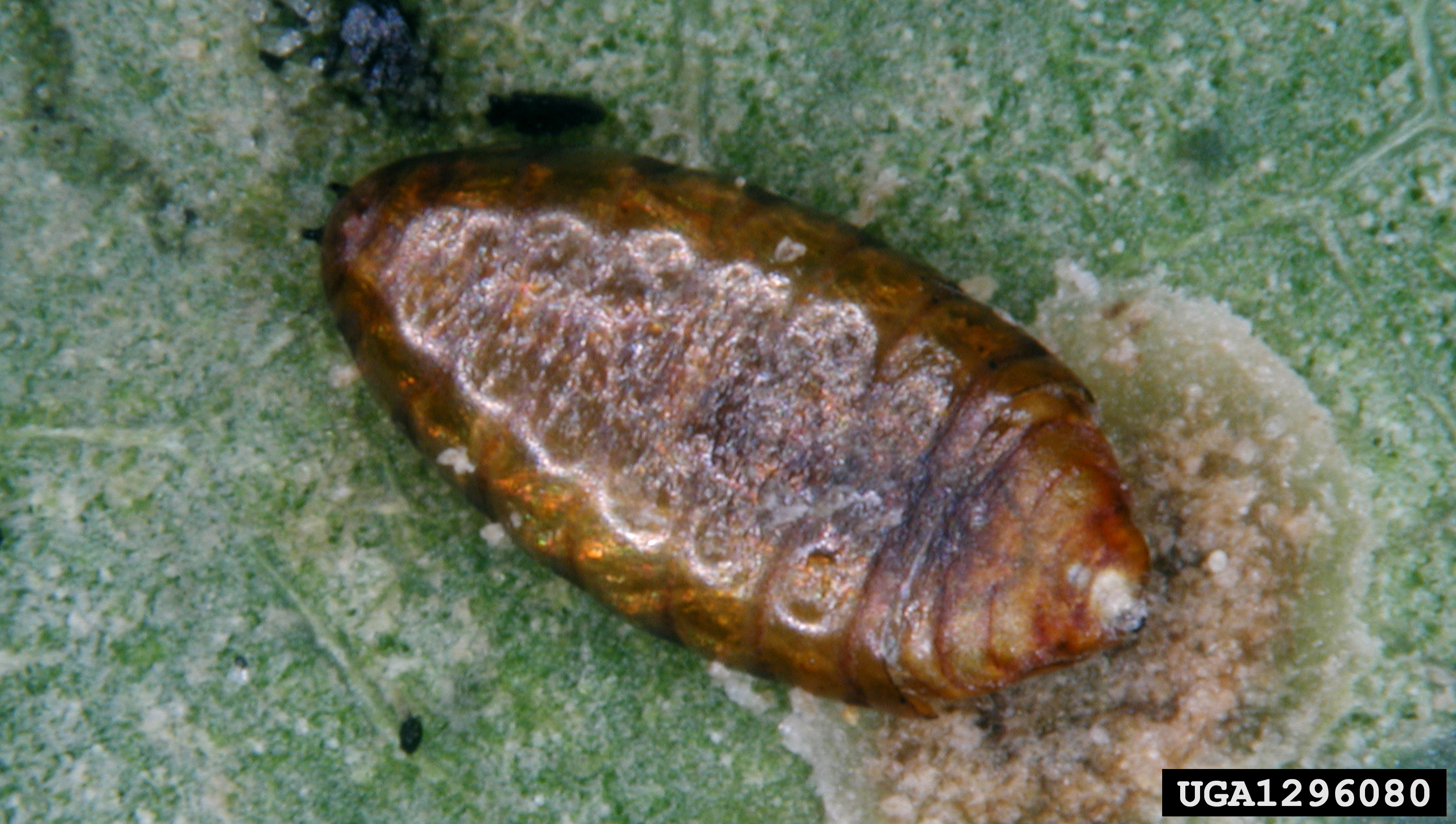
Puparium

== Distribution ==
The holly leaf miner is found throughout the holarctic on its host Ilex aquifolium. It is common and widespread in Europe and has been introduced into western Canada and north west USA. Its distribution is probably dependent upon average temperatures; Peterkin and Lloyd found it absent from areas where the mean temperatures of the coldest months of the year falls below −0.5 °C (31.1 °F).

== Life cycle ==
Female Agromyzidae insert an egg in the leaf tissue using an ovipositor. In the case of P. ilicis this poses a problem, because the leaf of the hostplant is unusually tough. Only during the annual flush in April, May, when new leaves unfold, is oviposition possible. Oviposition is in the underside of the petiole, or the basal part of the midrib. Oviposition induces the formation of a characteristic oviposition scar, enabling an estimate of the number of eggs that has been deposited. In a 1978 study, the maximum number of eggs laid per leaf was found to be five, with no more than two reaching the larval stage. The same study found an average of 38.6 eggs per 100 leaves on a single plant and that of these only 9.85% survive to produce viable, healthy larvae once natural mortality, and parasite and predatory factors are considered.

The emerging larva tunnels within the midrib, in the direction of the leaf tip. Only around January it enters the leaf blade, and starts making a recognisable leaf mine.

In one study, comparing P. ilicis to P. ilicicola on Ilex plants it was demonstrated that there were an average of 0.23 mines per leaf (or one mine for every four or five leaves on a plant). Up to three mines may occur on a leaf – often much less than the number of oviposition scars, suggesting that intra-leaf competition has taken place. P. ilicis is univolitine. The adult emerges in late May–June and leaves a >1 mm emergence hole (exit holes made by parasitoids are much smaller).

The characteristic mine of P. ilicis

=== Effect on the host plant ===
Mining of Ilex aquifolium by P. ilicis has little overall effect on the host plant. A leaf which has been mined may remain present on the host plant for an extended period, usually up to 5 years and exceptionally up to 8. Vacated mines have been shown to host unicellular algae and small mites. Mined leaves are also more likely to be shed by the plant.

== Predators and parasites ==
Phytomyza ilicis is particularly vulnerable to predation or attack during its larval and pupa stages. The holly leaf miner has frequently been used in ecological studies as a system to study food webs since examination of the leaves can reveal whether the leaf miner has successfully emerged, been killed by a parasitic wasp, or been predated by blue tits.

One of the most prominent predators is the blue tit Parus caeruleus, which leaves a characteristic V-shaped tear in the leaf. A 1983 study rejected the hypothesis that less-prickly holly leaves suffered a higher predation rate by tits.

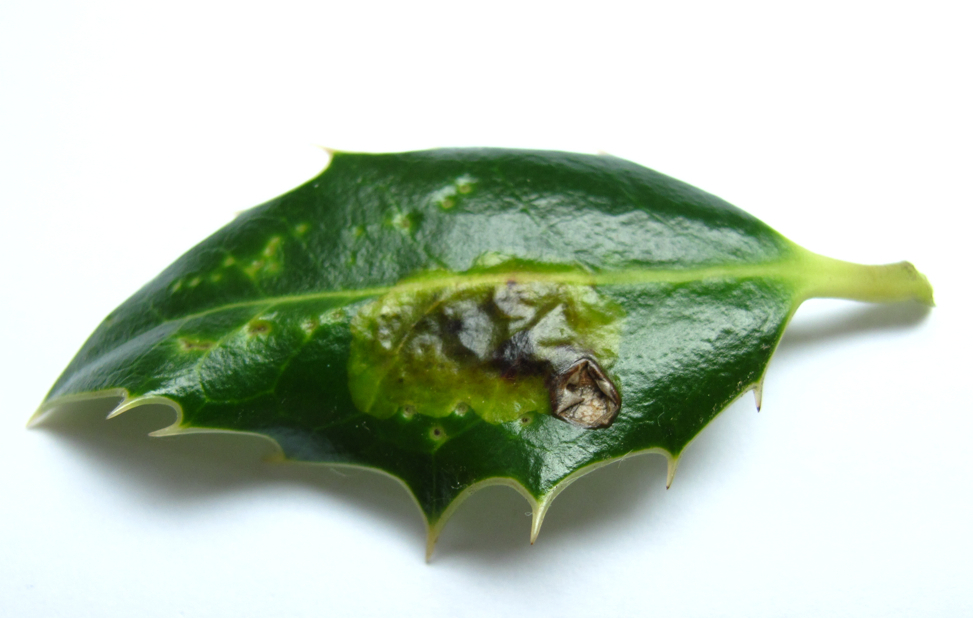
V-shaped hole showing bird predation of P. ilicis

In a study of parasitism published in 2000, it was recorded that of a large sample of mines 94 emerged as adult flies and 256 had succumbed to parasitoids. Parasitoids of P. ilicis include the Chalcid wasps Achrysocharoides latreillii, Chrysocharis gemma, Chrysocharis nephereus, Chrysocharis pentheus, Chrysocharis pubicornis, Closterocerus trifasciatus, Pediobius metallicus, Pediobius albipes, Pnigalio minio, Cyrtogaster vulgaris, Sphegigaster pallicornis, Mauleus iligneus, Epiclerus nomocerus, and the Brachonid wasps Opius pulchriceps, and Phaedrotoma pulchriceps. Many of these parasitoids also use the closely related holly-leaf miner Phytomyza ilicicola. An earlier study of parasitism found variable levels of parasitism and predation of P. ilicis between different plants in the same woodland, but as an example of their effect on the success of P. ilicis: from 100 mines on one tree 18.47% succumbed to egg mortality, 41.97% were eaten by birds, 9.83% died due to unknown causes, 2.88% were killed by pupal parasites, and 26.86% were assumed to eclose successfully.

== Biological control ==
Some of the parasitoids have been introduced as biological control agents to areas where P. ilicis has been introduced. In British Columbia, five species were released on Vancouver Island between 1936 and 1938. Of these, Chrysocharis gemma caused c.90% of the parasitism on Vancouver Island whereas Opius ilicis was responsible for approximately 90% of the parasitism on the mainland.

The Royal Horticultural Society notes that pesticides are unlikely to be effective against P. ilicis because the thick and glossy holly leaf prevents sprays from penetrating into the leaf. It highlights that P. ilicis has little impact on the health of the Ilex plant, but that leaves could be manually removed on smaller plants.
