= Highwood, Wokingham =

Nature reserve in Berkshire, England

Coordinates: 51.447°N 0.922°W

Highwood
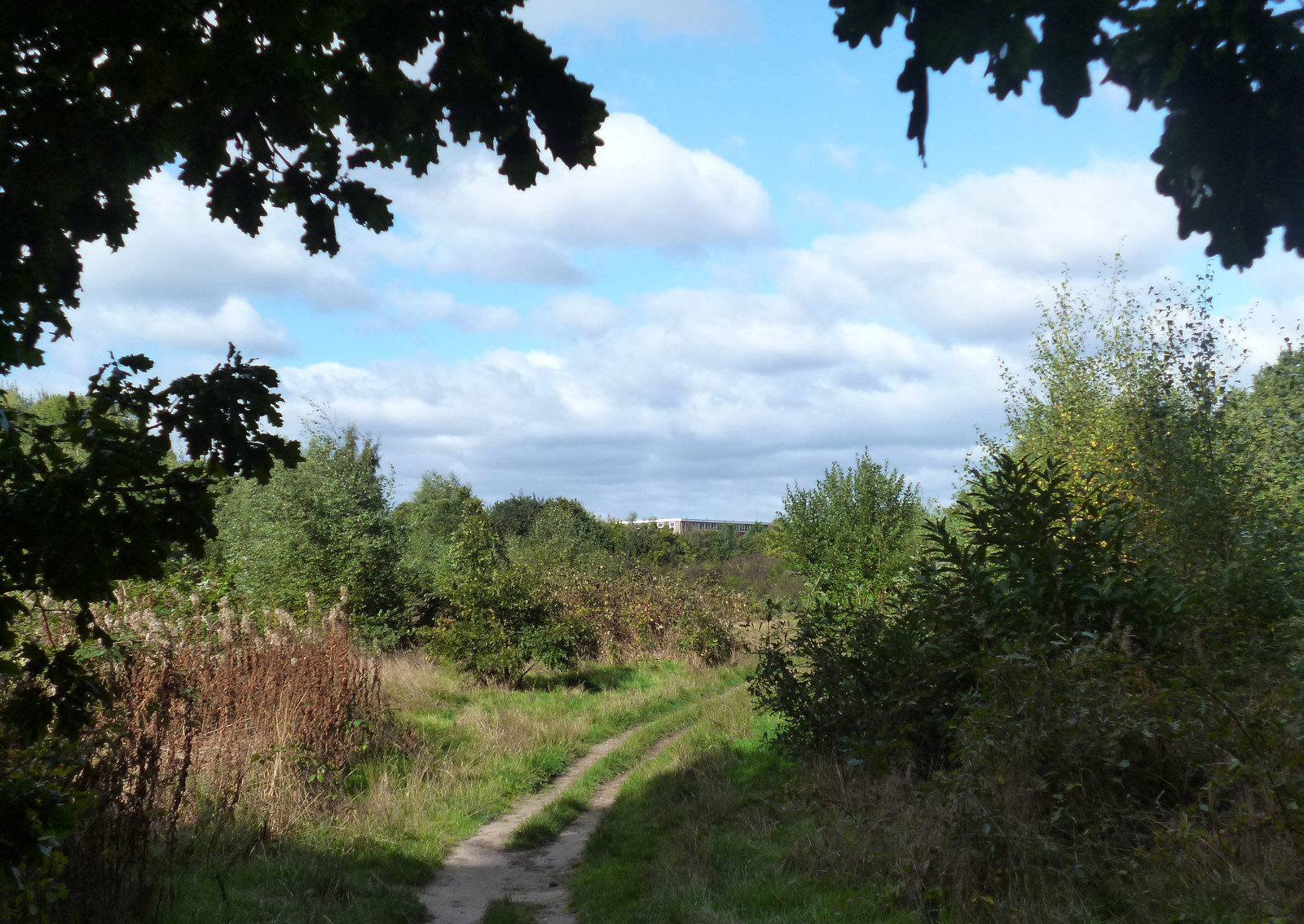
- Interactive map of Highwood
- Type: Local Nature Reserve
- Location: Woodley, Berkshire
- OS grid: SU 750 725
- Area: 15.2 hectares (38 acres)
- Manager: Wokingham Borough Council

Highwood is a 15.2-hectare (38-acre) Local Nature Reserve in Woodley, west of Wokingham in Berkshire. It is owned by Wokingham Borough Council and managed by the council together with The Friends of Highwood.

== Geography and site ==
The nature reserve is mixed lowland woodland with a heathland area. The site also features examples of exotic tree species which were part of an arboretum in the grounds of what was Woodley Lodge.

== History ==
Highwood used to form part of the grounds of Woodley Lodge.

== Fauna ==
The site has the following fauna:

=== Birds ===
- Common merganser
- Common pochard
- Northern shoveler
- Grey heron
- Grey wagtail
- Eurasian treecreeper
- Great spotted woodpecker
- Common kingfisher

== Flora ==
The site has the following flora:

=== Trees ===
- Araucaria araucana
- Sequoiadendron giganteum
