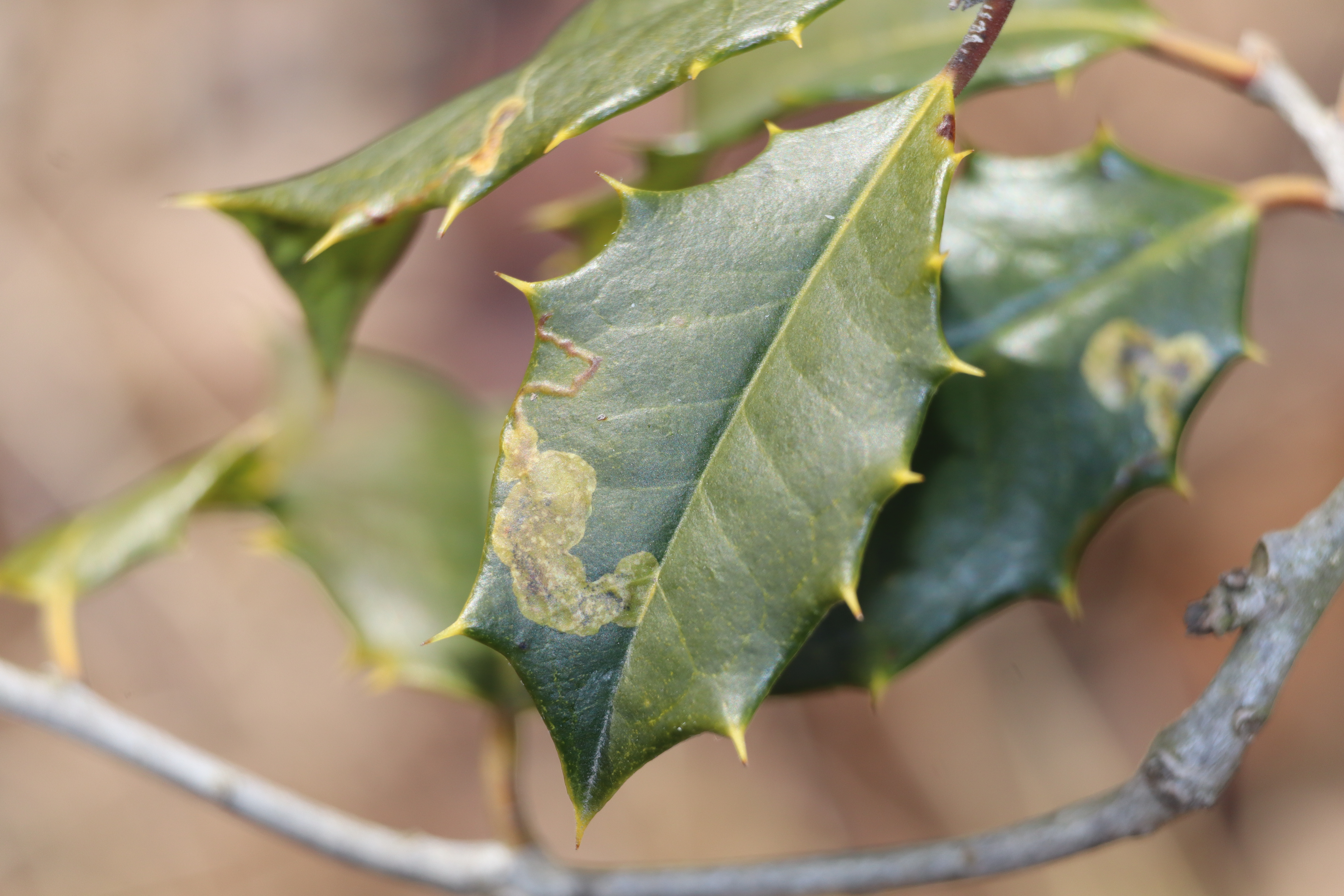
- Leafmine left by the species on an American holly

Scientific classification
- Kingdom: Animalia
- Phylum: Arthropoda
- Clade: Pancrustacea
- Class: Insecta
- Order: Diptera
- Family: Agromyzidae
- Genus: Phytomyza
- Species: P. ilicicola

Binomial name
- Phytomyza ilicicola Loew, 1872

= Phytomyza ilicicola =

Species of fly

Phytomyza ilicicola, the native holly leafminer, is a species of leaf miner fly in the family Agromyzidae. They are a pest of the American holly.
