= 2004 Wokingham District Council election =

2004 UK local government election

Map of the results of the 2004 Wokingham council election. Conservatives in blue and Liberal Democrats in yellow.

The 2004 Wokingham District Council election took place on 10 June 2004 to elect members of Wokingham Unitary Council in Berkshire, England. The whole council was up for election with boundary changes since the last election in 2003. The Conservative Party stayed in overall control of the council.

== Background ==
Since 2003 boundary changes meant that almost every ward was changed from the previous election with the only ones that remained the same being Charvil, Norreys and Winnersh. The number of wards was also increased from 24 to 25, but the number of seats on the council remaining the same. The boundary changes meant the whole council was up for election for the first time since the unitary authority was founded in 1997. Before the election the Conservatives had 33 seats and had controlled the council since the 2002 election.

== Election result ==
The results saw the Conservatives strengthen their control of the council after gaining 6 seats to hold 39 of the 54 seats. The Liberal Democrats fell back to 15 seats, while Labour lost their only seat on the council. The leader of the Liberal Democrats on the council, Coling Lawley, only survived the election by 4 votes in Coronation ward after 3 recounts. Overall turnout was 40.3% a rise of over 10% from the 2003 election.

Wokingham local election result 2004
Party	Seats	Gains	Losses	Net gain/loss	Seats %	Votes %	Votes	+/−
Conservative	39			+6	72.2	53.2	53,421	+4.8%
Liberal Democrats	15			-5	27.8	35.3	35,400	-6.0%
UKIP	0			0	0	5.7	5,730	+3.2%
Labour	0			-1	0	5.4	5,470	-1.7%
Green	0			0	0	0.4	367	+0.4%

== Ward results ==
Arborfield
Party	Candidate	Votes	%	±%
Conservative	Gary Cowan	512	78.3	
Liberal Democrats	John Bray	85	13.0	
UKIP	Joan Huntley	57	8.7	
Majority		427	65.3	
Turnout		654	39.6	

Barkham
Party	Candidate	Votes	%	±%
Conservative	Pamela Stubbs	601	73.3	
Liberal Democrats	Allan Wrobel	123	15.0	
UKIP	Robert Johnson	96	11.7	
Majority		478	58.3	
Turnout		820	34.1	

Bulmershe & Whitegates (3)
Party	Candidate	Votes	%	±%
Liberal Democrats	Jennifer Lissaman	1,167		
Liberal Democrats	George Storry	1,158		
Liberal Democrats	Sellam Rahmouni	1,089		
Conservative	Keith Baker	736		
Conservative	Susan Vosser	691		
Conservative	William Soane	688		
Labour	Pippa White	338		
Labour	Gerald Copitch	334		
Labour	Christopher Weavers	329		
Turnout		6,530	38.1	

Charvil
Party	Candidate	Votes	%	±%
Conservative	Pamela Graddon	583	51.0	
Liberal Democrats	Arthur Illenden	480	42.0	
UKIP	Vincent Pearson	47	4.1	
Labour	Brian Scott	34	3.0	
Majority		103	9.0	
Turnout		1,144	53.4	

Coronation (2)
Party	Candidate	Votes	%	±%
Conservative	Patricia Sherratt	900		
Liberal Democrats	Coling Lawley	842		
Conservative	Tanya De Hoedt	838		
Liberal Democrats	Denis Thair	758		
UKIP	Amy Thornton	274		
Labour	Jasdip Garcha	115		
Labour	Ian Hills	113		
Turnout		3,840	46.1	

Emmbrook (3)
Party	Candidate	Votes	%	±%
Conservative	Ullakarin Clark	1,549		
Conservative	John Mirfin	1,306		
Conservative	Deborah Lewis	1,258		
Liberal Democrats	Michael Gavin	774		
Liberal Democrats	Jeremy Harley	668		
Liberal Democrats	Pauline Hallam	666		
UKIP	Ann Davis	492		
UKIP	Peter Jackson	355		
Labour	Stella Howell	276		
Turnout		7,344	44.9	

Evendons (3)
Party	Candidate	Votes	%	±%
Conservative	Dianne King	1,302		
Conservative	Christopher Bowring	1,228		
Conservative	Denis Morgan	1,125		
Liberal Democrats	Tina Marinos	1,075		
Liberal Democrats	Keith Malvern	954		
Liberal Democrats	Frances Baylis	879		
UKIP	Jeremy Allison	353		
Labour	Paul French	257		
Turnout		7,173	40.7	

Finchampstead North (2)
Party	Candidate	Votes	%	±%
Conservative	Tim Charlesworth	1,268		
Conservative	Robert Stanton	1,178		
Liberal Democrats	Roland Cundy	485		
Liberal Democrats	Philip Bristow	421		
UKIP	Donald Campbell	421		
Turnout		3,540	46.9	

Finchampstead South (2)
Party	Candidate	Votes	%	±%
Conservative	Gerald Cockroft	1,037		
Conservative	Simon Weeks	1,024		
Liberal Democrats	Andrew May	435		
Liberal Democrats	Paul Randall	355		
UKIP	Leslie Huntley	249		
Turnout		3,100	40.2	

Hawkedon (3)
Party	Candidate	Votes	%	±%
Conservative	Matthew Deegan	954		
Conservative	Timothy Holton	943		
Conservative	Michael Firmager	942		
Liberal Democrats	John Eastwell	681		
Liberal Democrats	Andrew Long	647		
Liberal Democrats	Tahir Maher	583		
UKIP	Peter Williams	269		
Labour	John Cunningham	252		
Green	David Chapman	142		
Turnout		5,413	32.2	

Hillside (3)
Party	Candidate	Votes	%	±%
Liberal Democrats	Alan Spratling	1,205		
Liberal Democrats	David Hare	1,170		
Liberal Democrats	Tania Christidis	1,110		
Conservative	Andrew Bradley	1,084		
Conservative	Bharminder Bhathal	969		
Conservative	Paul Swaddle	961		
Labour	David Sharp	265		
UKIP	Kenneth Holman	200		
UKIP	Andrew Findlay	167		
UKIP	Jane Orme	150		
Turnout		7,281	39.4	

Hurst
Party	Candidate	Votes	%	±%
Conservative	Annette Drake	647	71.6	
Liberal Democrats	Haydon Trott	192	21.2	
Labour	Daniel Clifton	65	7.2	
Majority		455	50.4	
Turnout		904	43.4	

Loddon (3)
Party	Candidate	Votes	%	±%
Liberal Democrats	Alan Clifford	774		
Liberal Democrats	Christopher Clacey	719		
Liberal Democrats	Anthony Mattingley	677		
Conservative	Joanna Vosser	662		
Conservative	Kathryn Lewis	644		
Conservative	Abdul Loyes	558		
UKIP	William Brooks	252		
UKIP	John Inglese	229		
Labour	Robert Barker	212		
Labour	Janice Kite	204		
Labour	Gillian Smith	200		
Turnout		5,131	28.7	

Maiden Erlegh (3)
Party	Candidate	Votes	%	±%
Conservative	Christopher Edmunds	1,432		
Conservative	David Chopping	1,372		
Conservative	John Newman	1,263		
Liberal Democrats	Caroline Smith	1,013		
Liberal Democrats	Roy Neall	936		
Liberal Democrats	Shalid Younis	761		
UKIP	David Lamb	365		
Labour	Jacqueline Rupert	340		
Green	Russell Seymour	225		
Turnout		7,707	39.3	

Norreys (3)
Party	Candidate	Votes	%	±%
Conservative	Iain Brown	1,655		
Conservative	Marian Robertson	1,601		
Conservative	David Lee	1,556		
Liberal Democrats	Shelagh Flower	495		
Liberal Democrats	Robert Samuel	452		
Liberal Democrats	Vivienne Samuel	429		
Labour	John Woodward	358		
Turnout		6,546	39.0	

Remenham, Wargrave & Ruscombe (2)
Party	Candidate	Votes	%	±%
Conservative	Frank Browne	1,259		
Conservative	Christopher Schutz	1,139		
Liberal Democrats	Lindsay Ferris	742		
Liberal Democrats	Martin Alder	639		
Labour	Richard Fort	96		
Turnout		3,875	50.2	

Shinfield North
Party	Candidate	Votes	%	±%
Conservative	Norman Gould	343	58.2	
Labour	Paul Sharples	150	25.5	
Liberal Democrats	Fiona Rolls	96	16.3	
Majority		193	32.7	
Turnout		589	36.1	

Shinfield South (3)
Party	Candidate	Votes	%	±%
Conservative	Malcolm Bryant	918		
Conservative	Anthony Pollock	889		
Conservative	Barrie Patman	878		
Liberal Democrats	Elaine Spratling	296		
Liberal Democrats	Carolyn Hare	279		
Liberal Democrats	Mary Thompson	257		
Labour	Julianne Grafton	199		
UKIP	Alfred Newton	159		
Turnout		3,875	37.7	

Sonning
Party	Candidate	Votes	%	±%
Conservative	David Ashman	603	56.8	
Liberal Democrats	Carol Jewell	315	29.7	
UKIP	David Abbott	75	7.1	
Labour	Roger Hayes	68	6.4	
Majority		288	27.1	
Turnout		1,061	49.1	

South Lake (2)
Party	Candidate	Votes	%	±%
Liberal Democrats	Kay Gilder	724		
Liberal Democrats	Elizabeth Rowland	682		
Conservative	William Henderson	409		
Conservative	Susan Doughty	406		
UKIP	David Hill	205		
Labour	John Flen	163		
Labour	John Goodman	150		
Turnout		2,739	32.0	

Swallowfield
Party	Candidate	Votes	%	±%
Conservative	Diana Beatty	534	68.4	
Liberal Democrats	Peter Jackson	160	20.5	
UKIP	Rose Newton	87	11.1	
Majority		374	47.9	
Turnout		781	40.7	

Twyford (2)
Party	Candidate	Votes	%	±%
Liberal Democrats	Stephen Conway	1,260		
Liberal Democrats	Deidre Tomlin	1,081		
Conservative	John Jarvis	611		
Conservative	Mark Wilkins	435		
UKIP	Paul Dunn	158		
Labour	Roy Mantel	119		
Labour	Stuart Crainer	116		
Turnout		3,780	47.4	

Wescott (2)
Party	Candidate	Votes	%	±%
Conservative	Robert Wyatt	941		
Conservative	John Green	877		
Liberal Democrats	David Vaughan	498		
Liberal Democrats	Joyce Wise	355		
UKIP	Franklin Carstairs	225		
Labour	Anna Nemeth	186		
Turnout		3,082	41.3	

Winnersh (3)
Party	Candidate	Votes	%	±%
Conservative	Elizabeth Siggery	1,177		
Conservative	David Ball	1,159		
Liberal Democrats	Prue Bray	1,086		
Conservative	Derek Sefton	1,056		
Liberal Democrats	Malcolm Armstrong	846		
Liberal Democrats	Stephen Bacon	752		
UKIP	Anthony Pollock	406		
Labour	John Baker	160		
Turnout		6,642	41.6	

Wokingham Without (3)
Party	Candidate	Votes	%	±%
Conservative	Pauline Helliar-Symons	1,615		
Conservative	Perry Lewis	1,566		
Conservative	Angus Ross	1,539		
UKIP	Graham Widdows	439		
Labour	Roy Bailey	371		
Liberal Democrats	John Jewell	370		
Liberal Democrats	Kay Collins	367		
Liberal Democrats	Jeffrey Llewellin	337		
Turnout		6,604	41.0	
