= 2003 Wokingham District Council election =

2003 UK local government election

The 2003 Wokingham District Council election took place on 1 May 2003 to elect members of Wokingham Unitary Council in Berkshire, England. One third of the council was up for election and the Conservative Party stayed in overall control of the council.

After the election, the composition of the council was:

- Conservative 33
- Liberal Democrat 20
- Labour 1

== Election result ==
18 seats were contested with the Liberal Democrats defending 10, the Conservatives 7, while 1 seat was held by an independent. The results saw this situation turned round with the Conservatives winning 10 seats as compared to 8 for the Liberal Democrats. The Conservatives gained seats from the Liberal Democrats in Emmbrook and Little Hungerford wards, while also recovering Sonning which had been held by an independent who had defected from the Conservatives. There was controversy over the result in Whitegates when the Returning Officer initially read the results out as a Conservative gain, while the actual vote count was a Liberal Democrat hold. Overall turnout in the election was 30.4%.

The Conservatives described the results as an endorsement of their record, while the Liberal Democrats called them disappointing but were pleased that their vote share had increased from 2002.

Wokingham local election result 2003
Party	Seats	Gains	Losses	Net gain/loss	Seats %	Votes %	Votes	+/−
Conservative	10	3	0	+3	55.6	48.4	14,234	-0.7
Liberal Democrats	8	0	2	-2	44.4	41.3	12,124	+2.9
Labour	0	0	0	0	0.0	7.1	2,087	-1.8
UKIP	0	0	0	0	0.0	2.5	747	-0.1
Monster Raving Loony	0	0	0	0	0.0	0.6	188	+0.6
Independent	0	0	1	-1	0.0	N/A	N/A	-0.9

== Ward results ==
Barkham
Party	Candidate	Votes	%	±%
Conservative	Pamela Stubbs	399	76.0	−4.9
Liberal Democrats	Robert Bradshaw	65	12.4	+1.3
UKIP	Jeremy Allison	61	11.6	+11.6
Majority		334	63.6	−6.2
Turnout		525	28.5	−2.0
Conservative hold		Swing		

Coronation
Party	Candidate	Votes	%	±%
Liberal Democrats	Carol Jewell	847	43.3	
Conservative	Mark Wilkins	770	39.3	
UKIP	Amy Thornton	210	10.7	
Labour	Ian Hills	131	6.7	
Majority		77	4.0	
Turnout		1,958	34.3	−2.4
Liberal Democrats hold		Swing		

Emmbrook
Party	Candidate	Votes	%	±%
Conservative	Ullakarim Clark	794	47.8	−3.9
Liberal Democrats	Josephine Shockley	571	34.4	+2.0
UKIP	Ann Davis	173	10.4	+1.7
Labour	John Ferguson	123	7.4	+0.3
Majority		223	13.4	−5.9
Turnout		1,661	35.7	−3.8
Conservative gain from Liberal Democrats		Swing		

Evendons
Party	Candidate	Votes	%	±%
Liberal Democrats	Tina Marinos	1,210	48.2	+9.0
Conservative	Christopher Bowring	1,130	45.0	−4.9
Labour	John Baker	172	6.8	+0.9
Majority		80	3.2	
Turnout		2,512	29.8	−1.9
Liberal Democrats hold		Swing		

Finchampstead South
Party	Candidate	Votes	%	±%
Conservative	Muriel Long	897	67.7	−3.8
Liberal Democrats	Roland Cundy	428	32.3	+3.8
Majority		469	35.4	−7.6
Turnout		1,325	28.5	−1.4
Conservative hold		Swing		

Little Hungerford
Party	Candidate	Votes	%	±%
Conservative	David Chopping	1,261	47.2	−3.6
Liberal Democrats	Diana Buckley-Carpenter	1,219	45.6	+6.0
Labour	Jacqueline Rupert	193	7.2	−2.4
Majority		42	1.6	−9.6
Turnout		2,673	33.3	−0.6
Conservative gain from Liberal Democrats		Swing		

Loddon
Party	Candidate	Votes	%	±%
Liberal Democrats	Christopher Clacey	778	56.0	+8.1
Conservative	Lee Clarke	410	29.5	−2.7
Labour	Janice Kite	202	14.5	−0.6
Majority		368	26.5	+10.8
Turnout		1,390	21.8	−1.2
Liberal Democrats hold		Swing		

Norreys
Party	Candidate	Votes	%	±%
Conservative	David Lee	1,230	66.3	+7.3
Liberal Democrats	Michael Harper	382	20.6	+2.0
Labour	Paul Sharples	243	13.1	−4.6
Majority		848	45.7	+5.3
Turnout		1,855	30.1	−3.5
Conservative hold		Swing		

Redhatch
Party	Candidate	Votes	%	±%
Liberal Democrats	Fiona Rolls	1,389	44.5	−8.7
Conservative	Norman Jorgensen	1,316	42.2	+5.4
Labour	David Sharp	226	7.2	−2.9
Monster Raving Loony	Peter Owen	188	6.0	+6.0
Majority		73	2.3	−14.1
Turnout		3,119	25.9	+1.1
Liberal Democrats hold		Swing		

Remenham & Wargrave
Party	Candidate	Votes	%	±%
Conservative	Frank Browne	828	67.1	−1.9
Liberal Democrats	Lindsay Ferris	406	32.9	+1.9
Majority		422	34.2	−3.8
Turnout		1,234	36.5	−5.3
Conservative hold		Swing		

Shinfield
Party	Candidate	Votes	%	±%
Conservative	Barrie Patman	1,041	64.9	+1.0
Labour	Jacqueline Pluves	293	18.3	+3.1
Liberal Democrats	Rebecca Rowland	271	16.9	−4.0
Majority		748	46.6	+3.6
Turnout		1,605	26.8	−1.2
Conservative hold		Swing		

Sonning
Party	Candidate	Votes	%	±%
Conservative	Anthony Rimell	376	71.8	−12.5
Liberal Democrats	Robert Samuel	88	16.8	+7.8
UKIP	Peter Williams	32	6.1	+6.1
Labour	Michael Irving	28	5.3	−1.4
Majority		288	55.0	−19.7
Turnout		524	45.3	−0.1
Conservative gain from Independent		Swing		

South Lake
Party	Candidate	Votes	%	±%
Liberal Democrats	Kay Gilder	804	76.1	+23.1
Conservative	William Henderson	253	23.9	+4.1
Majority		551	52.2	+19.0
Turnout		1,057	23.7	−0.5
Liberal Democrats hold		Swing		

Twyford & Ruscombe
Party	Candidate	Votes	%	±%
Liberal Democrats	Christine Ferris	1,361	62.2	+0.6
Conservative	John Jarvis	665	30.4	−0.4
Labour	Roy Mantel	162	7.4	−0.2
Majority		696	31.8	+1.0
Turnout		2,188	38.0	−1.7
Liberal Democrats hold		Swing		

Wescott
Party	Candidate	Votes	%	±%
Conservative	John Green	686	55.1	+5.4
Liberal Democrats	Stephen Bacon	331	26.6	−10.5
Labour	Anna Nemeth	116	9.3	−3.8
UKIP	Franklin Carstairs	111	8.9	+8.9
Majority		355	28.5	+15.9
Turnout		1,244	32.9	−32.1
Conservative hold		Swing		

Whitegates
Party	Candidate	Votes	%	±%
Liberal Democrats	George Storry	666	58.8	+10.3
Conservative	Abdul Loyes	268	23.7	−1.3
Labour	Pippa White	198	17.5	−9.0
Majority		398	35.1	+13.1
Turnout		1,132	38.4	−29.1
Liberal Democrats hold		Swing		

Winnersh
Party	Candidate	Votes	%	±%
Liberal Democrats	Prue Bray	947	49.7	+19.3
Conservative	Anthony Hill	797	41.9	−8.1
UKIP	Anthony Pollock	160	8.4	+8.4
Majority		150	7.8	
Turnout		1,904	32.0	−2.8
Liberal Democrats hold		Swing		

Wokingham Without
Party	Candidate	Votes	%	±%
Conservative	Perry Lewis	1,113	75.5	
Liberal Democrats	Philip Bristow	361	24.5	
Majority		752	51.0	
Turnout		1,474	28.1	
Conservative hold		Swing		
