= 2002 Wokingham District Council election =

Election in Berkshire, England

The 2002 Wokingham District Council election took place on 2 May 2002 to elect members of Wokingham Unitary Council in Berkshire, England. One third of the council was up for election and the Conservative Party gained overall control of the council from no overall control.

After the election, the composition of the council was:

- Conservative 30
- Liberal Democrat 22
- Labour 1
- Independent 1

== Election results ==
The results saw the Conservatives win a majority on the council, after having had the same number of seats as the Liberal Democrats for the previous 2 elections. The Conservatives won 14 of the 20 seats which were up for election, including one uncontested seat in Wokingham Without. They made 4 gains from the Liberal Democrats in the wards of Coronation, Finchampstead North and Little Hungerford to finish the election with 30 seats as compared to 22 for the Liberal Democrats. Meanwhile, Labour won their first seat on the council since 1994 after making a gain in Bulmershe ward from the Liberal Democrats. Overall turnout was 32.8%.

The Conservatives said they were delighted with the results which they put down to their campaign on issues including green fields, crime and transport, and to the Liberal Democrats being out of touch with local residents. They said that now they had control of the council they would take action on crime and traffic congestion and review the number of new houses planned. Meanwhile, the Liberal Democrat leader Charles Kennedy described the results in Wokingham as predictable and a "slight set-back", which he put down to them defending seats from when the Conservatives were performing much less strongly nationally.

Wokingham local election result 2002
Party	Seats	Gains	Losses	Net gain/loss	Seats %	Votes %	Votes	+/−
Conservative	14	4	0	+4	73.7	49.1	16,030	+6.6
Liberal Democrats	4	0	5	-5	21.1	38.4	12,544	-1.5
Labour	1	1	0	+1	5.3	8.9	2,921	-8.2
UKIP	0	0	0	0	0.0	2.6	862	+2.6
Independent	0	0	0	0	0.0	0.9	306	+0.8

One Conservative candidate was unopposed in the election.

== Ward results ==
Arborfield
Party	Candidate	Votes	%	±%
Conservative	Gary Cowan	503	85.8	+20.3
Liberal Democrats	John Eastwell	83	14.2	−20.3
Majority		420	71.6	+40.6
Turnout		586	37.5	
Conservative hold		Swing		

Bulmershe
Party	Candidate	Votes	%	±%
Labour	Nelson Bland	503	42.0	+6.1
Liberal Democrats	Edward Preston	467	38.9	+2.2
Conservative	William Henderson	168	14.0	−13.4
UKIP	Jeremy Allison	61	5.1	+5.1
Majority		36	3.1	
Turnout		1,199	38.9	−25.1
Labour gain from Liberal Democrats		Swing		

Coronation (2)
Party	Candidate	Votes	%	±%
Conservative	David Ashman	1,102		
Conservative	Paul Swaddle	1,041		
Liberal Democrats	David Glover	863		
Liberal Democrats	Thomas McCann	811		
UKIP	Amy Thornton	230		
Labour	Ian Hills	218		
Turnout		4,265	36.7	
Conservative gain from Liberal Democrats		Swing		
Conservative gain from Liberal Democrats		Swing		

Emmbrook
Party	Candidate	Votes	%	±%
Conservative	Raymond Eke	966	51.7	+10.2
Liberal Democrats	Josephine Shockley	606	32.4	−14.5
UKIP	Ann Davis	163	8.7	+8.7
Labour	John Woodward	133	7.1	−4.6
Majority		360	19.3	
Turnout		1,868	39.5	−28.8
Conservative hold		Swing		

Evendons
Party	Candidate	Votes	%	±%
Conservative	Denis Morgan	1,349	49.9	+3.9
Liberal Democrats	John Griffin	1,060	39.2	−2.9
Labour	Paul French	159	5.9	−6.0
UKIP	Franklin Carstairs	135	5.0	+5.0
Majority		289	10.7	+6.8
Turnout		2,703	31.6	−34.4
Conservative hold		Swing		

Finchampstead North
Party	Candidate	Votes	%	±%
Conservative	Robert Stanton	1,194	57.5	+4.7
Liberal Democrats	Roland Cundy	884	42.5	−4.7
Majority		310	15.0	+9.4
Turnout		2,078	46.1	−22.0
Conservative gain from Liberal Democrats		Swing		

Finchampstead South
Party	Candidate	Votes	%	±%
Conservative	Gerald Cockroft	1,012	71.5	+9.8
Liberal Democrats	Philip Bristow	403	28.5	−9.8
Majority		609	43.0	+19.6
Turnout		1,415	29.9	+0.9
Conservative hold		Swing		

Little Hungerford
Party	Candidate	Votes	%	±%
Conservative	Christopher Edmunds	1,417	50.8	+12.2
Liberal Democrats	Caroline Smith	1,106	39.6	−4.3
Labour	Jacqueline Rupert	268	9.6	−7.9
Majority		311	11.2	
Turnout		2,791	33.9	−29.8
Conservative gain from Liberal Democrats		Swing		

Loddon
Party	Candidate	Votes	%	±%
Liberal Democrats	Denis Thair	710	47.9	+6.0
Conservative	Joanna Vosser	478	32.2	−1.6
Labour	Janice Kite	224	15.1	−9.2
UKIP	Noel Squire	71	4.8	+4.8
Majority		232	15.7	+7.6
Turnout		1,483	23.0	−37.1
Liberal Democrats hold		Swing		

Norreys
Party	Candidate	Votes	%	±%
Conservative	Marian Robertson	1,241	59.0	+8.1
Liberal Democrats	Mark Gray	392	18.6	−8.8
Labour	Paul Sharples	372	17.7	−4.0
UKIP	Antony Whitfield	97	4.6	+4.6
Majority		849	40.4	+16.9
Turnout		2,102	33.6	−31.3
Conservative hold		Swing		

Redhatch
Party	Candidate	Votes	%	±%
Liberal Democrats	Alan Spratling	1,607	53.2	+7.8
Conservative	Norman Jorgensen	1,111	36.8	+1.4
Labour	Nirmala Harlow	305	10.1	−4.2
Majority		496	16.4	+6.4
Turnout		3,023	24.8	−34.6
Liberal Democrats hold		Swing		

Remenham & Wargrave
Party	Candidate	Votes	%	±%
Conservative	Robert Haacke	973	69.0	−5.6
Liberal Democrats	Lindsay Ferris	437	31.0	+13.6
Majority		536	38.0	−19.2
Turnout		1,410	41.8	+9.1
Conservative hold		Swing		

Shinfield
Party	Candidate	Votes	%	±%
Conservative	Anthony Pollock	1,075	63.9	+11.5
Liberal Democrats	Rebecca Rowland	351	20.9	−5.0
Labour	Owen Waite	256	15.2	−6.6
Majority		724	43.0	+12.5
Turnout		1,682	28.0	−32.1
Conservative hold		Swing		

South Lake
Party	Candidate	Votes	%	±%
Liberal Democrats	Elizabeth Rowland	596	53.0	+1.8
Conservative	William Soane	223	19.8	−5.2
Labour	David Kay	201	17.9	−5.9
UKIP	Peter Williams	105	9.3	+9.3
Majority		373	33.2	+7.0
Turnout		1,125	24.2	−34.8
Liberal Democrats hold		Swing		

Swallowfield
Party	Candidate	Votes	%	±%
Conservative	Diana Beatty	419	78.8	+1.4
Liberal Democrats	Michael Harper	113	21.2	+10.7
Majority		306	57.6	−7.7
Turnout		532	36.0	
Conservative hold		Swing		

Twyford & Ruscombe
Party	Candidate	Votes	%	±%
Liberal Democrats	Deirdre Tomlin	1,415	61.6	+4.4
Conservative	John Jarvis	707	30.8	−1.3
Labour	Roy Mantel	175	7.6	−3.1
Majority		708	30.8	+5.7
Turnout		2,297	39.7	−27.1
Liberal Democrats hold		Swing		

Winnersh
Party	Candidate	Votes	%	±%
Conservative	David Ball	1,051	50.0	+0.8
Liberal Democrats	Morag Ward	640	30.4	−9.1
Independent	Robert Turner	306	14.5	+14.5
Labour	Robert Woodrow	107	5.1	−6.2
Majority		411	19.6	+9.9
Turnout		2,104	34.8	−27.9
Conservative hold		Swing		

Wokingham Without
Party	Candidate	Votes	%	±%
Conservative	Angus Ross	unopposed		
Conservative hold		Swing		
