= Calderdale Council elections =

Local government elections in West Yorkshire, England

Coordinates: 53.716347°N 1.860026°W

Calderdale Metropolitan Borough Council is the local authority for Calderdale in West Yorkshire, England. One third of the council is elected each year, except for every fourth year when there is no election.

== Historical political make-up ==
=== 2020s ===
Year	Reform	Labour	Conservative	Lib Dems	Green	Workers Party	Ind
2026	34	8	0	2	7	1	2
2024	0	29	11	6	3	1	1
2023	0	28	15	6	2	0	0
2022	0	28	15	6	1	0	1
2021	0	28	16	5	0	0	2
2021	0	28	15	5	0	0	3

=== 2010s ===
Year	Labour	Conservative	Ind. Con.	Lib Dems	Ind. LD	Ind	BNP	Change UK
2019	28	12	0	7	0	4	0	0
2019	28	12	0	7	0	3	0	1
2019	28	14	0	7	0	2	0	0
2018	24	20	0	6	0	1	0	0
2018	24	19	1	6	0	1	0	0
2018	23	20	1	5	0	2	0	0
2016	23	21	0	5	0	2	0	0
2016	23	22	0	5	0	1	0	0
2015	24	21	0	5	0	1	0	0
2014	25	19	0	6	0	1	0	0
2012	21	17	0	11	0	2	0	0
2012	20	17	0	12	0	2	0	0
2011	13	21	0	13	1	3	0	0
2011	13	21	0	14	0	2	1	0
2010	10	19	0	17	0	4	1	0
2010	10	20	0	17	0	3	1	0

=== 2000s ===
Year	Labour	Conservative	Lib Dems	Ind	BNP	Eng Dem
2009	9	21	15	3	2	1
2008	9	21	16	2	2	1
2008	9	20	17	2	2	1
2007	11	18	17	3	1	1
2007	11	18	16	4	1	1
2006	10	18	16	4	2	1
2006	10	20	16	3	2	0
2004	9	21	15	3	3	0

== Council elections ==
- 1973 Calderdale Metropolitan Borough Council election
- 1975 Calderdale Metropolitan Borough Council election
- 1976 Calderdale Metropolitan Borough Council election
- 1978 Calderdale Metropolitan Borough Council election
- 1979 Calderdale Metropolitan Borough Council election
- 1980 Calderdale Metropolitan Borough Council election
- 1982 Calderdale Metropolitan Borough Council election
- 1983 Calderdale Metropolitan Borough Council election
- 1984 Calderdale Metropolitan Borough Council election
- 1986 Calderdale Metropolitan Borough Council election
- 1987 Calderdale Metropolitan Borough Council election
- 1988 Calderdale Metropolitan Borough Council election
- 1990 Calderdale Metropolitan Borough Council election
- 1991 Calderdale Metropolitan Borough Council election
- 1992 Calderdale Metropolitan Borough Council election
- 1994 Calderdale Metropolitan Borough Council election
- 1995 Calderdale Metropolitan Borough Council election
- 1996 Calderdale Metropolitan Borough Council election
- 1998 Calderdale Metropolitan Borough Council election
- 1999 Calderdale Metropolitan Borough Council election
- 2000 Calderdale Metropolitan Borough Council election
- 2002 Calderdale Metropolitan Borough Council election
- 2003 Calderdale Metropolitan Borough Council election
- 2004 Calderdale Metropolitan Borough Council election (new ward boundaries)
- 2006 Calderdale Metropolitan Borough Council election
- 2007 Calderdale Metropolitan Borough Council election
- 2008 Calderdale Metropolitan Borough Council election
- 2010 Calderdale Metropolitan Borough Council election
- 2011 Calderdale Metropolitan Borough Council election
- 2012 Calderdale Metropolitan Borough Council election
- 2014 Calderdale Metropolitan Borough Council election
- 2015 Calderdale Metropolitan Borough Council election
- 2016 Calderdale Metropolitan Borough Council election
- 2018 Calderdale Metropolitan Borough Council election
- 2019 Calderdale Metropolitan Borough Council election
- 2021 Calderdale Metropolitan Borough Council election
- 2022 Calderdale Metropolitan Borough Council election
- 2023 Calderdale Metropolitan Borough Council election
- 2024 Calderdale Metropolitan Borough Council election
- 2026 Calderdale Metropolitan Borough Council election (new ward boundaries)

== Borough result maps ==
2004 results map

2006 results map

2007 results map

2008 results map

2010 results map

2011 results map

2012 results map

2014 results map

2015 results map

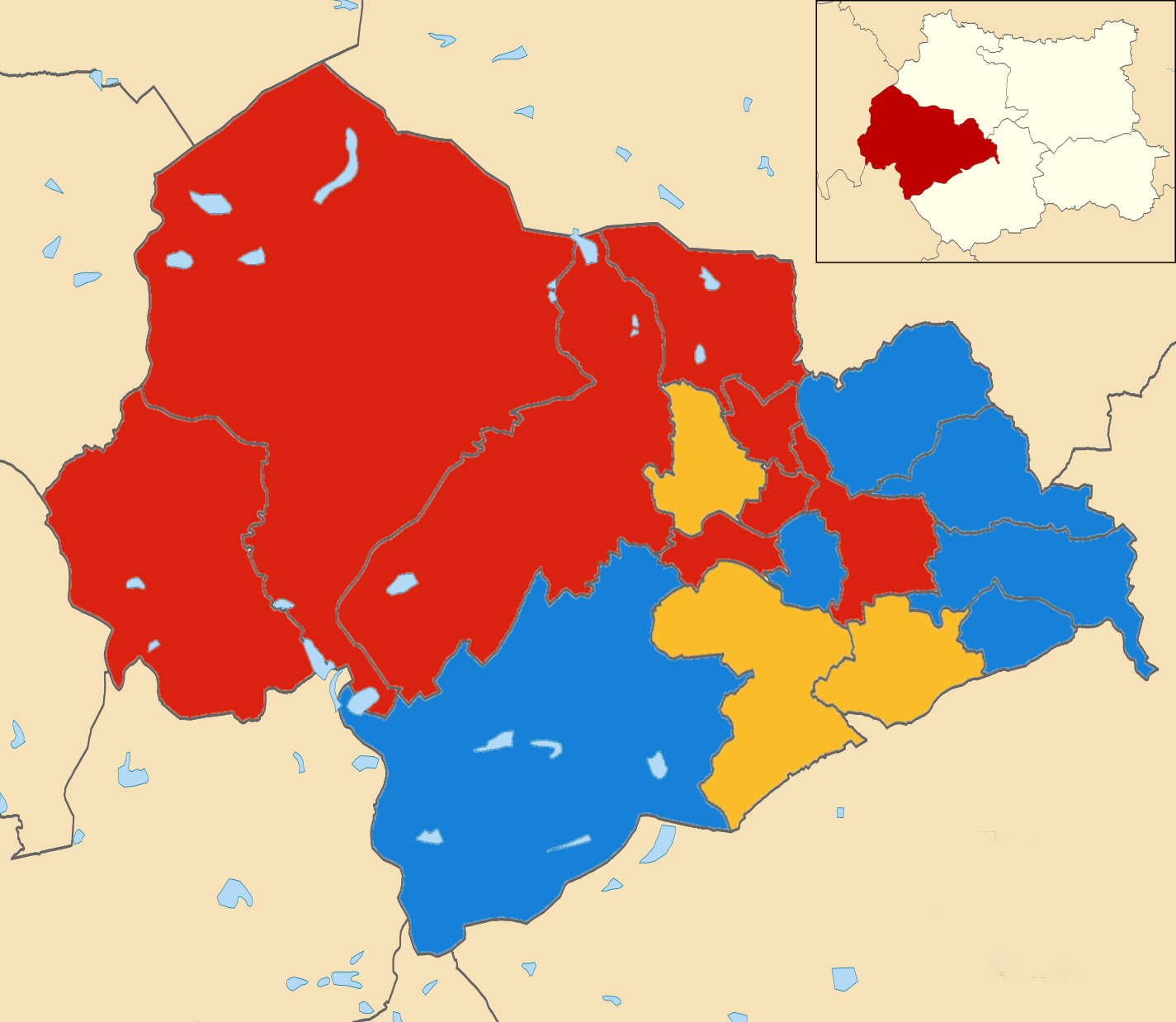
2016 results map

2018 results map

2019 results map

2021 results map

2022 results map

2023 results map

2024 results map

2026 results map

== By-election results ==
By-election	Date	Incumbent party	Winning party
Brighouse by-election	22 May 1974	Conservative	Labour
Lightcliffe by-election	18 November 1977	Conservative	Conservative
Hebden Bridge by-election	24 August 1978	Conservative	Conservative
Town by-election	8 November 1979	Conservative	Labour
Skircoat by-election	18 December 1980	Conservative	Conservative
St. John's by-election	27 August 1982	Labour	Labour
Luddenden Foot by-election	18 August 1983	Conservative	Alliance
Mixenden by-election	26 January 1984	Labour	Labour
Todmorden by-election	24 May 1984	Alliance	Alliance
Northowram and Shelf by-election	6 September 1984	Conservative	Conservative
Calder Valley by-election	14 February 1985	Alliance	Alliance
Hipperholme and Lightcliffe by-election	23 May 1985	Conservative	Conservative
Ryburn by-election	28 November 1985	Conservative	Conservative
St. John's by-election	3 July 1986	Labour	Labour
Brighouse by-election	9 October 1986	Labour	Labour
Rastrick by-election	24 September 1987	Alliance	Conservative
Town by-election	24 September 1987	Labour	Labour
Town by-election	16 February 1989	Labour	Labour
Calder Valley by-election	20 April 1989	Alliance	Labour
St. John's by-election	12 October 1989	Labour	Labour
Town by-election	27 September 1990	Labour	Conservative
Brighouse by-election	8 November 1990	Conservative	Labour
Luddenden Foot by-election	28 August 1991	Liberal Democrats	Liberal Democrats
Ryburn by-election	22 November 1991	Conservative	Conservative
St. John's by-election	19 November 1992	Labour	Labour
Calder Valley by-election	9 September 1993	Liberal Democrats	Liberal Democrats
Ryburn by-election	3 August 1995	Conservative	Labour
Todmorden by-election	1 May 1997	Labour	Liberal Democrats
Todmorden by-election	19 January 1998	Labour	Liberal Democrats
Elland by-election	29 October 1999	Liberal Democrats	Liberal Democrats
Calder Valley by-election	5 December 2002	Liberal Democrats	Liberal Democrats
Mixenden by-election	23 January 2003	Labour	BNP
Rastrick by-election	6 February 2003	Conservative	Conservative
Mixenden by-election	16 October 2003	Liberal Democrats	Liberal Democrats
Illingworth and Mixenden by-election	22 February 2007	Labour	Labour
Skircoat by-election	2 April 2009	Conservative	Conservative
Warley by-election	19 July 2012	Liberal Democrats	Liberal Democrats
Hipperholme and Lightcliffe by-election	6 April 2017	Conservative	Conservative
Rastrick by-election	8 June 2017	Conservative	Conservative
Todmorden by-election	8 June 2017	Labour	Labour
Park by-election	2 September 2021	Labour	Labour
Ryburn by-election	2 September 2021	Independent	Conservative
Calder by-election	24 October 2024	Labour	Labour
Skircoat by-election	8 May 2025	Labour	Reform
