= 2024 Calderdale Metropolitan Borough Council election =

2024 local election in Calderdale, England

- 2 May 2024

17 of 51 seats on Calderdale Metropolitan Borough Council 26 seats needed for a majority
- Turnout: 34.4% (▼9.9%)

	First party	Second party	Third party
Leader	Jane Scullion	Steven Leigh	Paul Bellenger
Party	Labour	Conservative	Liberal Democrats
Leader's seat	Luddendenfoot	Ryburn	Greetland and Stainland
Last election	28 seats, 44.1%	15 seats, 29.3%	6 seats, 12.6%
Seats won	29	11	6
Seat change	▲1	▼4	Steady
	Fourth party	Fifth party	Sixth party
Leader	Unknown	None	Unknown
Party	Green	Independent	Workers Party
Last election	2 seats, 12.1%	0 seats, 0.6%	N/A
Seats won	3	1	1
Seat change	▲1	▲1	▲1
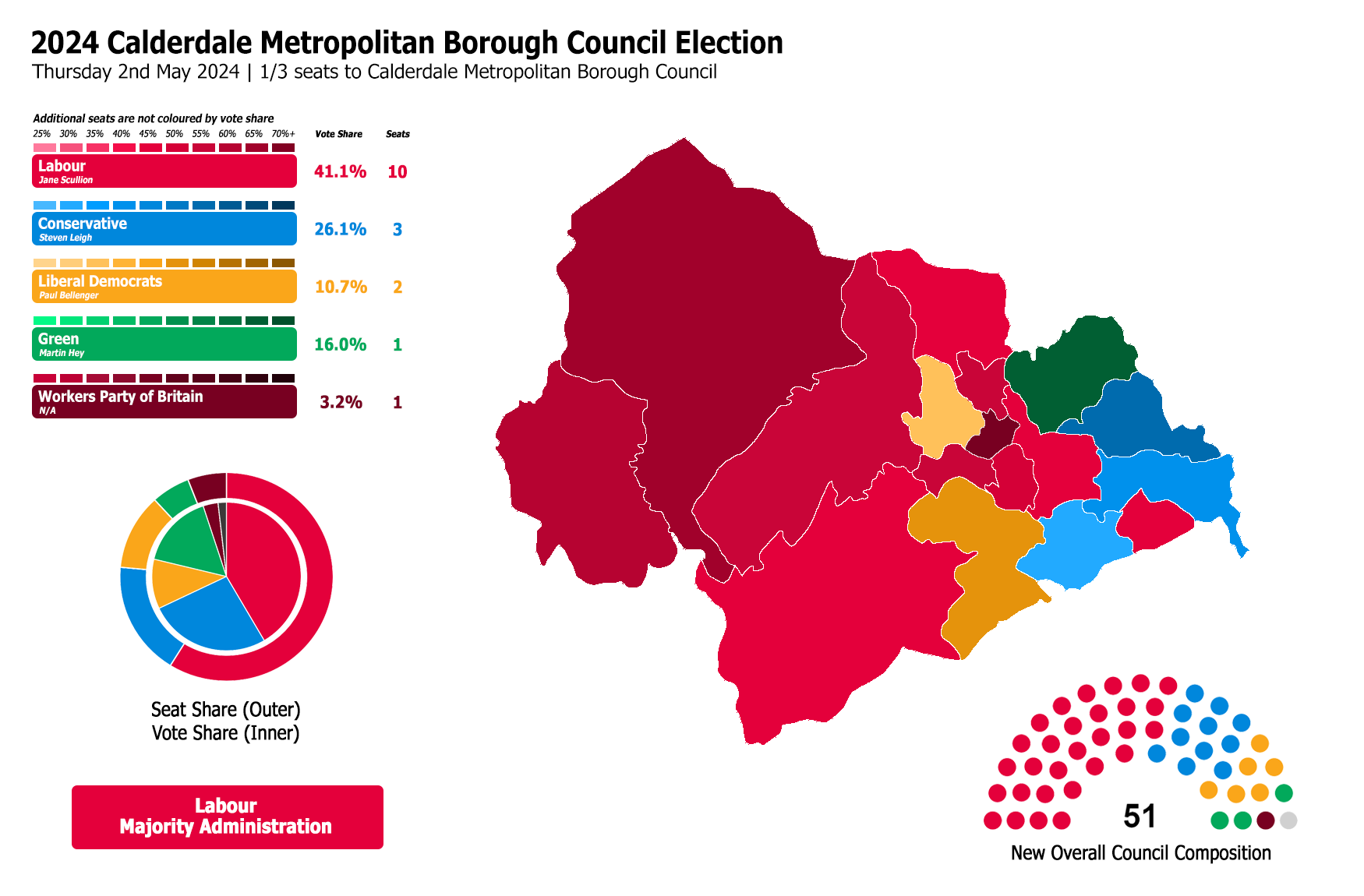
- Map of the results of the election by ward
Leader before election
Jane Scullion
Labour
Leader after election
Jane Scullion
Labour

The 2024 Calderdale Metropolitan Borough Council election was held on 2 May 2024, alongside the other local elections across the United Kingdom being held on the same day. The council remained under Labour majority control.

== Background ==
Results from 2021, when these seats were last up for election

The Local Government Act 1972 created a two-tier system of metropolitan counties and districts covering Greater Manchester, Merseyside, South Yorkshire, Tyne and Wear, the West Midlands, and West Yorkshire starting in 1974. Calderdale was a district of the West Yorkshire metropolitan county. The Local Government Act 1985 abolished the metropolitan counties, with metropolitan districts taking on most of their powers as metropolitan boroughs. The West Yorkshire Combined Authority was established in 2014 and began electing the mayor of West Yorkshire in 2021.

Calderdale Council was under no overall control with Conservative, Liberal Democrat and Labour leaders until the Labour Party achieved a majority of seats in the 2019 election, when they gained four seats to hold 28 of the council's 51 seats. In the most recent election in 2023, seventeen seats were up for election. Labour won ten seats, the Conservatives won four seats, Liberal Democrats won two seats and the Greens won one seat.

Seats up for election in 2024 were last elected in 2021. These elections were originally scheduled for 2020, but were delayed by a year due to the COVID-19 pandemic. In that election, the Conservatives won nine seats, Labour won eight, and the Liberal Democrats won two. Labour retained its majority on the council at this election.

== Electoral process ==
The council elects its councillors in thirds, with a third being up for election for three consecutive years and no election in the fourth year. The election used first-past-the-post voting, with wards generally being represented by three councillors, with one elected in each election year to serve a four-year term.

All registered electors (British, Irish, Commonwealth and European Union citizens) living in Calderdale aged 18 or over were entitled to vote in the election. People who live at two addresses in different councils, such as university students with different term-time and holiday addresses, are entitled to be registered for and vote in elections in both local authorities. Voting in-person at polling stations took place from 07:00 to 22:00 on election day, and voters were able to apply for postal votes or proxy votes in advance of the election.

== Council results ==
Calderdale Metropolitan Borough Council's composition following the 2024 election.

- Turnout: 52,112
- Electorate: 151,597

2024 Calderdale Metropolitan Borough Council election
Party	This election			Full council			This election		
Party	Seats	Net	Seats %	Other	Total	Total %	Votes	Votes %	+/−
Labour	10	▲1	58.8	19	29	56.9	21,418	41.1	+3.8
Conservative	3	▼4	17.6	8	11	21.6	13,585	26.1	-12.9
Liberal Democrats	2	Steady	11.8	4	6	11.8	5,556	10.7	-0.6
Independent	0	▲1	0.0	1	1	2.0	835	1.6	-1.7
Green	1	▲1	5.9	2	3	5.9	8,311	16.0	+7.7
Workers Party	1	▲1	5.9	0	1	2.0	1,643	3.2	New
Freedom Alliance	0	Steady	0.0	0	0	0.0	139	0.3	+0.2

== Council composition ==
Prior to the election the composition of the council was:

↓
27	14	6	2	1	1
Labour	Conservative	Lib Dem	Green	Ind	Vac

After the election the composition of the council was:

↓
29	11	6	3	1	1
Labour	Conservative	Lib Dem	Green	Ind	WPB

After 2023 election		Before 2024 election		After 2024 election	
Party	Seats	Party	Seats	Party	Seats
Labour	28	Labour	27	Labour	29
Conservative	15	Conservative	14	Conservative	11
Liberal Democrats	6	Liberal Democrats	6	Liberal Democrats	6
Green	2	Green	2	Green	3
Independent	0	Independent & vacant	2	Independent & other	1
Workers Party	0	Workers Party	0	Workers Party	1

== Ward results ==
Incumbent councillors are marked with an asterisk.

=== Brighouse ===
Brighouse (1)
Party	Candidate	Votes	%	±%
Conservative	Geraldine Carter	1,163	40.8	−10.9
Labour	Frank Darnley	1,078	37.8	+9.5
Green	Kim Atkinson	445	15.6	+5.6
Liberal Democrats	Jennie Rigg	126	4.4	+0.9
Majority		85	3.0	−13.7
Rejected ballots		40	1.4	
Turnout		2,852	34.6	−10.7
Registered electors		8,249		
Conservative hold		Swing	▼10.2	

=== Calder ===
Calder (1)
Party	Candidate	Votes	%	±%
Labour Co-op	Josh Fenton-Glynn*	3,008	67.0	+1.0
Green	Mark Stanley	638	14.2	+4.9
Conservative	Christopher Lee	574	12.8	−5.4
Liberal Democrats	Chris Wadsworth	222	4.9	+0.6
Majority		2,370	52.7	+4.9
Rejected ballots		53	1.2	
Turnout		4,495	48.7	−6.7
Registered electors		9,239		
Labour hold		Swing	▼1.95	

=== Elland ===
Elland (1)
Party	Candidate	Votes	%	±%
Conservative	Peter Hunt	786	30.9	−5.8
Labour	Khuram Majid	700	27.5	−7.3
Liberal Democrats	Richard Phillips	574	22.5	+1.3
Green	Barry Crossland	446	17.5	+10.8
Majority		86	3.4	+1.5
Rejected ballots		40	1.6	
Turnout		2,546	28.7	−9.2
Registered electors		8,878		
Conservative hold		Swing	▲0.75	

=== Greetland and Stainland ===
Greetland and Stainland (1)
Party	Candidate	Votes	%	±%
Liberal Democrats	Paul Bellenger*	1,526	50.6	−8.2
Conservative	Alex Greenwood	806	26.7	−6.4
Labour	Mark Pitkethly	420	13.9	−0.2
Green	Jacquelyn Haigh	240	8.0	−1.6
Majority		720	23.9	+23.2
Rejected ballots		26	0.9	
Turnout		3,018	35.5	−16.9
Registered electors		8,503		
Liberal Democrats hold		Swing	▼0.9	

=== Hipperholme and Lightcliffe ===
Hipperholme and Lightcliffe (1)
Party	Candidate	Votes	%	±%
Conservative	George Robinson*	1,846	57.0	−10.5
Labour	Sam Ackroyd	934	28.8	+5.9
Green	Catherine Graham	299	9.2	+2.5
Liberal Democrats	Nikki Stocks	122	3.8	+1.5
Majority		912	28.2	−16.4
Rejected ballots		37	1.2	
Turnout		3,238	35.2	−8.6
Registered electors		9,208		
Conservative hold		Swing	▼8.2	

=== Ilingworth and Mixenden ===
Illingworth and Mixenden (1)
Party	Candidate	Votes	%	±%
Labour	Shane Taylor	1,168	49.5	+10.3
Conservative	Stephen Padgett	640	27.1	−15.3
Green	Laura Beesley	169	7.2	+4.1
Independent	Seán Loftus	143	6.1	+4.4
Independent	Sara Gaunt	135	5.7	New
Liberal Democrats	Nicholas Proctor	79	3.3	+1.7
Majority		528	22.4	19.2
Rejected ballots		25	1.1	
Turnout		2,359	25.3	−6.6
Registered electors		9,319		
Labour gain from Conservative		Swing	▲12.8	

=== Luddendenfoot ===
Luddendenfoot (1)
Party	Candidate	Votes	%	±%
Labour	Jane Scullion*	1,862	57.7	+12.1
Conservative	Jill Smith-Moorhouse	731	22.6	−13.2
Liberal Democrats	Christine Bampton-Smith	307	9.5	−0.3
Green	Kate Sweeny	295	9.1	+0.9
Majority		1,131	35.0	+25.3
Rejected ballots		33	1.0	
Turnout		3,228	40.5	−7.1
Registered electors		7,965		
Labour hold		Swing	▲12.65	

=== Northowram and Shelf ===
Northowram and Shelf (1)
Party	Candidate	Votes	%	±%
Green	Elaine Hey	2,275	67.6	+43.7
Conservative	John Vaughan	737	21.9	−36.2
Labour	Allen Slingsby	327	9.7	−6.1
Majority		1,538	45.7	+11.5
Rejected ballots		28	0.8	
Turnout		3,367	37.0	−4.4
Registered electors		9,106		
Green gain from Conservative		Swing	▲39.95	

=== Ovenden ===
Ovenden (1)
Party	Candidate	Votes	%	±%
Labour Co-op	Danielle Durrans*	919	55.3	+10.1
Conservative	Anne Baines	358	21.5	−15.9
Liberal Democrats	Sean Bamforth	188	11.3	Steady
Green	Finn Jensen	166	9.9	+4.6
Majority		561	33.7	+25.9
Rejected ballots		32	1.92	
Turnout		1,663	19.7	−5.9
Registered electors		8,422		
Labour hold		Swing	▲13.0	

=== Park ===
Park (1)
Party	Candidate	Votes	%	±%
Workers Party	Shakir Saghir	1,643	43.9	New
Green	Sabir Hussain	953	25.4	+22.2
Labour	Sadia Zaman	758	20.2	−40.4
Liberal Democrats	Samuel Jackson	190	5.1	+2.5
Conservative	Naveed Khan	164	4.4	−28.7
Majority		690	18.4	−9.1
Rejected ballots		38	1.0	
Turnout		3,746	39.1	−2.3
Registered electors		9,576		
Workers Party gain from Labour		Swing		

=== Rastrick ===
Rastrick (1)
Party	Candidate	Votes	%	±%
Labour Co-op	Alan Judge	1,317	45.4	+15.6
Conservative	Joseph Matthews	1,151	39.6	−18.6
Green	Andrew Bramley	237	8.2	−0.8
Liberal Democrats	Bernardette Stancliffe	165	5.7	+3.2
Majority		166	5.7	−22.7
Rejected ballots		34	1.2	
Turnout		2,904	35.0	−8.4
Registered electors		8,300		
Labour gain from Conservative		Swing	▲17.1	

=== Ryburn ===
Ryburn (1)
Party	Candidate	Votes	%	±%
Labour	Leah Webster	1,554	48.2	+27.2
Conservative	Robert Thornber*	1,270	39.4	−7.7
Green	Cordelia Prescott	197	6.1	+0.6
Liberal Democrats	Rosemary Tatchell	165	5.1	+2.6
Majority		284	8.8	−15.9
Rejected ballots		41	1.27	
Turnout		3,227	36.0	−6.2
Registered electors		8,962		
Labour gain from Conservative		Swing	▲17.45	

=== Skircoat ===
Skircoat (1)
Party	Candidate	Votes	%	±%
Labour Co-op	Ann Kingstone*	1,932	51.1	+1.8
Conservative	Oliver Gibson	950	25.1	−10.0
Green	Robert Orange	558	14.8	−3.9
Liberal Democrats	Michael Holdsworth	309	8.2	+2.0
Majority		982	26.0	+11.8
Rejected ballots		34	0.9	
Turnout		3,783	39.1	−6.1
Registered electors		9,685		
Labour hold		Swing	▲5.9	

=== Sowerby Bridge ===
Sowerby Bridge (1)
Party	Candidate	Votes	%	±%
Labour	Adam Wilkinson*	1,702	58.5	+6.2
Conservative	Mark Edwards	695	23.9	−12.9
Green	David Booth	295	10.1	+3.2
Liberal Democrats	Diana Harris	167	5.7	+2.5
Majority		1,007	34.6	+19.2
Rejected ballots		50	1.7	
Turnout		2,909	33.0	−6.5
Registered electors		8,820		
Labour hold		Swing	▲9.55	

=== Todmorden ===
Todmorden (1)
Party	Candidate	Votes	%	±%
Labour Co-op	Diana Tremayne*	1,919	60.9	+9.4
Conservative	Brian Carter	525	16.7	−5.0
Green	Kieran Turner	495	15.7	+6.2
Liberal Democrats	Abdul Kye	160	5.1	−9.5
Majority		1,394	44.2	+14.5
Rejected ballots		52	1.7	
Turnout		3,151	35.1	−6.5
Registered electors		8,983		
Labour hold		Swing	▲7.2	

=== Town ===
Town (1)
Party	Candidate	Votes	%	±%
Labour Co-op	Kelly Thornham	1,160	47.0	−2.7
Conservative	Vishal Gupta	839	34.0	+1.1
Green	Elliot Hey	329	13.3	+1.9
Liberal Democrats	Garry Prashad	103	4.2	−0.9
Majority		321	13.0	−3.8
Rejected ballots		36	1.5	
Turnout		2,467	26.9	−4.0
Registered electors		9,173		
Labour hold		Swing	▼1.9	

=== Warley ===
Warley (1)
Party	Candidate	Votes	%	±%
Liberal Democrats	Ashley Evans*	1,153	36.5	−5.7
Labour	Ben Jancovich	660	20.9	−10.4
Independent	Sohail Ashfaq	557	17.6	New
Conservative	Stephen Baines	350	11.1	−9.9
Green	Katie Witham	274	8.7	+3.8
Freedom Alliance	Martin Davies	139	4.4	New
Majority		493	15.6	+4.7
Rejected ballots		26	0.8	
Turnout		3,159	34.3	−4.7
Registered electors		9,209		
Liberal Democrats hold		Swing	▲2.35	

== Changes 2024–2026 ==
=== Affiliation changes ===
- Dan Sutherland, councillor for Illingworth & Mixenden ward and last elected for the Labour Party in 2022, defected to Reform UK on 24 February 2025.

=== By-elections ===
==== Calder ====
Calder by-election: 24 October 2024
Party	Candidate	Votes	%	±%
Labour	Jonathan Timbers	1,009	36.3	–30.7
Green	Kieran Turner	784	28.2	+14.0
Liberal Democrats	Chris Wadsworth	407	14.6	+9.7
Independent	Scott Borrows	316	11.4	N/A
Conservative	Brian Carter	251	9.0	–3.8
SDP	Jim McNeill	12	0.4	N/A
Majority		225	8.1	–44.6
Rejected ballots		13	0.47	
Turnout		2,792	29.4	–19.3
Labour hold		Swing	▼22.4	

The incumbent was Josh Fenton-Glynn for Labour who resigned after being elected MP for Calder Valley in the 2024 United Kingdom general election.

==== Skircoat ====
Skircoat by-election: 8 May 2025
Party	Candidate	Votes	%	±%
Reform	Paul Hawkaluk	1,392	36.8	N/A
Labour	David John Mendes Da Costa	1,059	28.0	–23.1
Green	Roseanne Marie Sweeney	566	15.0	+0.2
Liberal Democrats	Stephen Alexander Gow	411	10.9	+2.7
Conservative	Vishal Gupta	355	9.4	–15.7
Majority		333	8.8	
Rejected ballots		8	0.21	
Turnout		3,791	38.5	
Reform gain from Labour				

The incumbent was Mike Barnes for Labour who decided to step down.
