= 2015 Calderdale Metropolitan Borough Council election =

2015 local election in England

Calderdale Metropolitan Borough Council Elections, 2015
- 7 May 2015

One third (17 of 51) to Calderdale Metropolitan Borough Council 26 seats needed for a majority
	First party	Second party	Third party
Leader	Stephen Baines	Tim Swift	Janet Battye
Party	Conservative	Labour	Liberal Democrats
Leader's seat	Northowram & Shelf	Town	Calder
Seats won	10, 58.8%	6, 35.3%	1, 5.9%
Seat change	▲2	▼1	▼1
Popular vote	37,280	33,432	10,447
Percentage	38.1%	34.2%	10.7%
Swing	▲5.8%	▼0.7%	▼7.2%
Council control before election
No Overall Control
Council control after election
No Overall Control

The 2015 Calderdale Metropolitan Borough Council election took place on 7 May 2015 to elect members of Calderdale in England. This was on the same day as other local elections and a general election. One councillor was elected in each ward for a four-year term so the councillors elected in 2015 last stood for election in 2011. Each ward is represented by three councillors, the election of which is staggered, so only one third of the councillors were elected in this election. Before the election there was no overall control with a minority Labour administration which was over-ruled at a Budget vote by a coalition of Conservatives & Liberal Democrats leading to a Conservative minority administration. After the election there was still no overall control & a Labour minority administration was formed again.

Results of the 2015 council election in Calderdale

== Council results ==
2015 Calderdale Metropolitan Borough Council election
Party	Candidates						Votes		
Party	Stood	Elected	Gained	Unseated	Net	% of total	%	No.	Net %
Conservative	17	10	2	0	▲2	58.8	38.1	37,280	▲5.8
Labour	17	6	0	1	▼1	35.3	34.2	33,432	▼0.7
Liberal Democrats	17	1	0	1	▼1	5.9	10.7	10,447	▼7.2
UKIP	9	0	0	0	Steady	0.0	7.8	7,663	▲7.8
Green	17	0	0	0	Steady	0.0	7.5	7,361	▲4.0
TUSC	3	0	0	0	Steady	0.0	0.4	400	▲0.4
National Front	1	0	0	0	Steady	0.0	0.1	146	▼3.3
Independent	1	0	0	0	Steady	0.0	0.1	69	▼6.7

The percentage change for the National Front vote is compared to the combined showing for the BNP & BPP parties in 2011.

== Council composition ==
Prior to the election the composition of the council was:

↓
25	19	6	1
Labour	Conservative	Lib Dem	Ind

After the election the composition of the council was:

↓
24	21	5	1
Labour	Conservative	Lib Dem	Ind

Party	Previous council	New council
Labour	25	24
Conservative	19	21
Liberal Democrats	6	5
Independent	1	1
Total	51	51

== Ward results ==
The electoral division results listed below are based on the changes from the last time this third was up for election, in the 2011 elections, not taking into account any mid-term by-elections or party defections.

=== Brighouse ward ===
Brighouse
Party	Candidate	Votes	%	±%
Conservative	Scott Lloyd Benton	2,622	45.8	+10.7
Labour	Anthony John Rutherford	1,674	29.2	−3.1
UKIP	Nick Yates	869	15.2	+15.2
Green	John Richard Ward Nesbitt	237	4.1	+4.1
Liberal Democrats	Jennie Dawn Rigg	235	4.1	−1.4
TUSC	Samuel George Webb	53	0.9	+0.9
Majority		948	16.6	+13.9
Turnout		5,724	67.4	+24.9
Conservative hold		Swing	+6.9	

The incumbent was Scott Benton for the Conservative Party.

=== Calder ward ===
Calder
Party	Candidate	Votes	%	±%
Labour	Dave Young	2,762	39.0	+3.5
Conservative	Owen Idris Gilroy	1,412	19.9	+0.4
Green	Tessa Gordziejko	1,396	19.7	+3.6
Liberal Democrats	Michael Stephen Smith	688	9.7	−12.6
UKIP	Elizabeth Anne Halbert	581	8.2	+8.2
Independent	Stephen Denis Curry	177	2.5	−5.6
Majority		1,350	19.0	+5.8
Turnout		7,087	76.3	+24.1
Labour hold		Swing	+8.0	

The incumbent was Dave Young for the Labour Party.

=== Elland ward ===
Elland
Party	Candidate	Votes	%	±%
Conservative	John Frank Brearley Ford	1,883	35.8	+3.8
Labour	James Stephen Hepplestone	1,672	31.8	+2.8
Liberal Democrats	David Hardy	1,273	24.2	−5.7
Green	Richard Anthony Lupson	364	6.9	−1.5
Majority		211	4.0	+1.9
Turnout		5,263	61.6	+24.1
Conservative hold		Swing	+0.5	

The incumbent was John Ford for the Conservative Party.

=== Greetland & Stainland ward ===
Greetland & Stainland
Party	Candidate	Votes	%	±%
Conservative	Chris Pearson	2,317	40.5	+7.1
Liberal Democrats	Paul Alexander Bellenger	1,473	25.7	−11.6
Labour	Robin Dixon	1,004	17.5	−3.7
UKIP	Mick Clarke	684	11.9	+11.9
Green	Susan Ann Thomas	223	3.9	−3.8
Majority		844	14.7	
Turnout		5,726	66.9	
Conservative gain from Liberal Democrats		Swing	+9.3	

The incumbent Peter Wardhaugh for the Liberal Democrats stood down at this election.

=== Hipperholme & Lightcliffe ward ===
Hipperholme & Lightcliffe
Party	Candidate	Votes	%	±%
Conservative	David Eric Kirton	3,878	62.6	+7.1
Labour	Kashif Ali	1,254	20.3	−3.7
Green	Alan Patrick McDonald	510	8.2	−3.8
Liberal Democrats	Christine Irene Bampton-Smith	473	7.6	−11.6
Majority		2,624	42.4	+10.8
Turnout		6,191	69.2	+26.7
Conservative hold		Swing	+9.1	

The incumbent was David Kirton for the Conservative Party.

=== Illingworth & Mixenden ward ===
Illingworth & Mixenden
Party	Candidate	Votes	%	±%
Labour	Barry Kaye Collins	2,082	39.4	−4.8
Conservative	Joe Clegg	1,537	29.1	−1.7
UKIP	David Ian Ginley	1,309	24.8	+24.8
Green	Alexander Rudkin	137	2.6	+2.6
Liberal Democrats	Mat Bowles	120	2.3	−1.0
Independent	Sean Vincent Loftus	69	1.3	−1.7
Majority		545	10.3	−3.0
Turnout		5,287	57.8	+20.8
Labour hold		Swing	-1.5	

The incumbent was Barry Collins for the Labour Party.

=== Luddendenfoot ward ===
Luddendenfoot
Party	Candidate	Votes	%	±%
Conservative	Nicola Jayne May	1,890	32.3	−6.1
Labour	Charlotte Constance Brady	1,749	29.9	−7.1
Liberal Democrats	Karl Antony Boggis	860	14.7	−9.2
UKIP	Chris Baksa	717	12.2	+12.2
Green	Elizabeth Jane King	602	10.3	+10.3
Majority		141	2.4	+1.0
Turnout		5,857	72.1	+26.1
Conservative hold		Swing	+0.5	

The incumbent was Richard Marshall for the Conservative Party who stood down at this election.

=== Northowram & Shelf ward ===
Northowram & Shelf
Party	Candidate	Votes	%	±%
Conservative	Roger Laurence Taylor	3,781	60.7	+5.1
Labour	Gary Walsh	1,661	26.7	−4.6
Green	Elaine Hey	425	6.8	+6.8
Liberal Democrats	Michael Taylor	263	4.2	−1.3
Majority		2,120	34.1	+9.7
Turnout		6,226	69.2	+26.9
Conservative hold		Swing	+4.9	

The incumbent was Roger Taylor for the Conservative Party.

=== Ovenden ward ===
Ovenden
Party	Candidate	Votes	%	±%
Labour	Bryan Thomas Raymond Smith	1,990	47.6	−9.2
Conservative	John Charles Shoesmith	971	23.2	+2.4
UKIP	Geoffrey Thompson	934	22.3	+22.3
Green	Kenneth Albert Hall	155	3.7	+3.7
Liberal Democrats	Rosemary Mabel Tatchell	112	2.7	−4.4
Majority		1,056	25.2	−10.7
Turnout		4,185	49.6	+22.4
Labour hold		Swing	-5.8	

The incumbent was Bryan Smith for the Labour Party.

=== Park ward ===
Park
Party	Candidate	Votes	%	±%
Labour	Faisal Shoukat	4,183	72.0	+20.3
Conservative	Shakir Saghir	980	16.9	+7.7
Liberal Democrats	John Dennis Reynolds	299	5.1	−22.8
Green	Karen Elizabeth Levin	268	4.6	+4.6
Majority		3,203	55.1	+31.4
Turnout		5,813	62.4	+11.0
Labour hold		Swing	+21.5	

The incumbent was Faisal Shoukat for the Labour Party.

The Swing is from the Liberal Democrat party to the Labour Party.

=== Rastrick ward ===
Rastrick
Party	Candidate	Votes	%	±%
Conservative	Chris Pillai	2,632	47.2	+11.7
Labour	Peter Judge	2,020	36.2	+3.7
Liberal Democrats	Kathy Haigh-Hutchinson	389	7.0	−5.6
Green	Mark Richard Mullany	307	5.5	+5.5
TUSC	Robert Golding Bailey	170	3.0	+3.0
Majority		612	11.0	+8.0
Turnout		5,582	66.4	+25.4
Conservative hold		Swing	+4.0	

The incumbent was Chris Pillai for the Conservative Party.

=== Ryburn ward ===
Ryburn
Party	Candidate	Votes	%	±%
Conservative	Robert Ernest Thornber	3,221	52.1	−0.6
Labour	Robert Gibbon	1,382	22.4	−7.9
UKIP	Lisa Melanie Smith	757	12.3	+12.3
Green	Freda Mary Davis	400	6.5	−1.9
Liberal Democrats	Ashley John Richard Evans	380	6.1	−2.0
Majority		1,839	29.8	+7.3
Turnout		6,179	69.9	+27.9
Conservative hold		Swing	+3.7	

The incumbent was Robert Thornber for the Conservative Party.

=== Skircoat ward ===
Skircoat
Party	Candidate	Votes	%	±%
Conservative	Marcus Joseph Thompson	3,185	47.8	+11.3
Labour	Mohammad Naeem	1,740	26.1	+3.2
Liberal Democrats	Stephen Alexander Gow	1,033	15.5	−16.8
Green	Gary Michael Scott	622	9.3	+1.5
Majority		1,445	21.7	+17.5
Turnout		6,658	69.7	23.8
Conservative hold		Swing	+14.4	

The incumbent was Marcus Thompson for the Conservative Party. The Swing is from Liberal Democrat to Conservative.

=== Sowerby Bridge ward ===
Sowerby Bridge
Party	Candidate	Votes	%	±%
Conservative	Mike Payne	2,336	43.2	+6.5
Labour	Dave Draycott	2,086	38.6	−4.4
Green	Charles Gate	539	10.0	+10.0
Liberal Democrats	Tom Stringfellow	363	6.7	−3.1
Majority		250	4.6	−1.7
Turnout		5,404	62.4	+24.1
Conservative gain from Labour		Swing	+5.5	

The incumbent was Dave Draycott for the Labour Party.

=== Todmorden ward ===
Todmorden
Party	Candidate	Votes	%	±%
Labour	Jayne Booth	2,306	38.3	+6.1
Conservative	Mark Scott Gledhill	1,718	28.5	+6.1
UKIP	Philip Anthony Walters	704	11.7	+11.7
Green	Oxana Nikolaevna Poberejnaia	637	10.6	+3.5
Liberal Democrats	Muhammad Asif	442	7.3	−11.9
National Front	Chris Jackson	146	2.4	−3.1
Majority		588	9.8	0.0
Turnout		6,020	67.5	+23.8
Labour hold		Swing	+0.0	

The incumbent was Jayne Booth for the Labour Party.

The percentage change for the National Front is expressed compared to the showing of the BPP party in 2011.

=== Town ward ===
Town
Party	Candidate	Votes	%	±%
Labour	Tim Swift	2,022	40.8	−12.2
Conservative	Louisa Mary Waple	1,397	28.2	−0.1
UKIP	Phillip Spencer Charlton	1,108	22.4	+22.4
Green	Sarah Louise Moakler	236	4.8	+4.8
Liberal Democrats	Ruth Coleman-Taylor	144	2.9	−3.8
Majority		625	12.6	−12.1
Turnout		4,950	56.0	+22.0
Labour hold		Swing	-6.1	

The incumbent was Timothy Smith for the Labour Party.

=== Warley ward ===
Warley
Party	Candidate	Votes	%	±%
Liberal Democrats	James Baker	1,900	33.7	−3.7
Labour	Surraya Bibi	1,845	32.7	−0.4
Conservative	Tony Fall	1,520	27.0	+5.0
Green	Katharine Gate Scott	303	5.4	+5.4
Majority		55	1.0	−3.3
Turnout		5,635	63.2	+21.3
Liberal Democrats hold		Swing	-1.7	

The incumbent was James Baker for the Liberal Democrats.
