= 2016 Calderdale Metropolitan Borough Council election =

2016 local election in England

Calderdale Metropolitan Borough Council Elections, 2016
- 5 May 2016

One third (17 of 51) to Calderdale Metropolitan Borough Council 26 seats needed for a majority
	First party	Second party	Third party
Leader	Tim Swift	Stephen Baines	Janet Battye
Party	Labour	Conservative	Liberal Democrats
Leader's seat	Town	Northowram & Shelf	Calder
Seats won	8, 47.1%	6, 35.3%	3, 17.6%
Seat change	▼1	▲1	Steady
Popular vote	21,115	16,697	8,588
Percentage	37.9%	29.9%	15.4%
Swing	▼2.2%	▼0.8%	▼4.3%
Council control before election
No Overall Control
Council control after election
No Overall Control

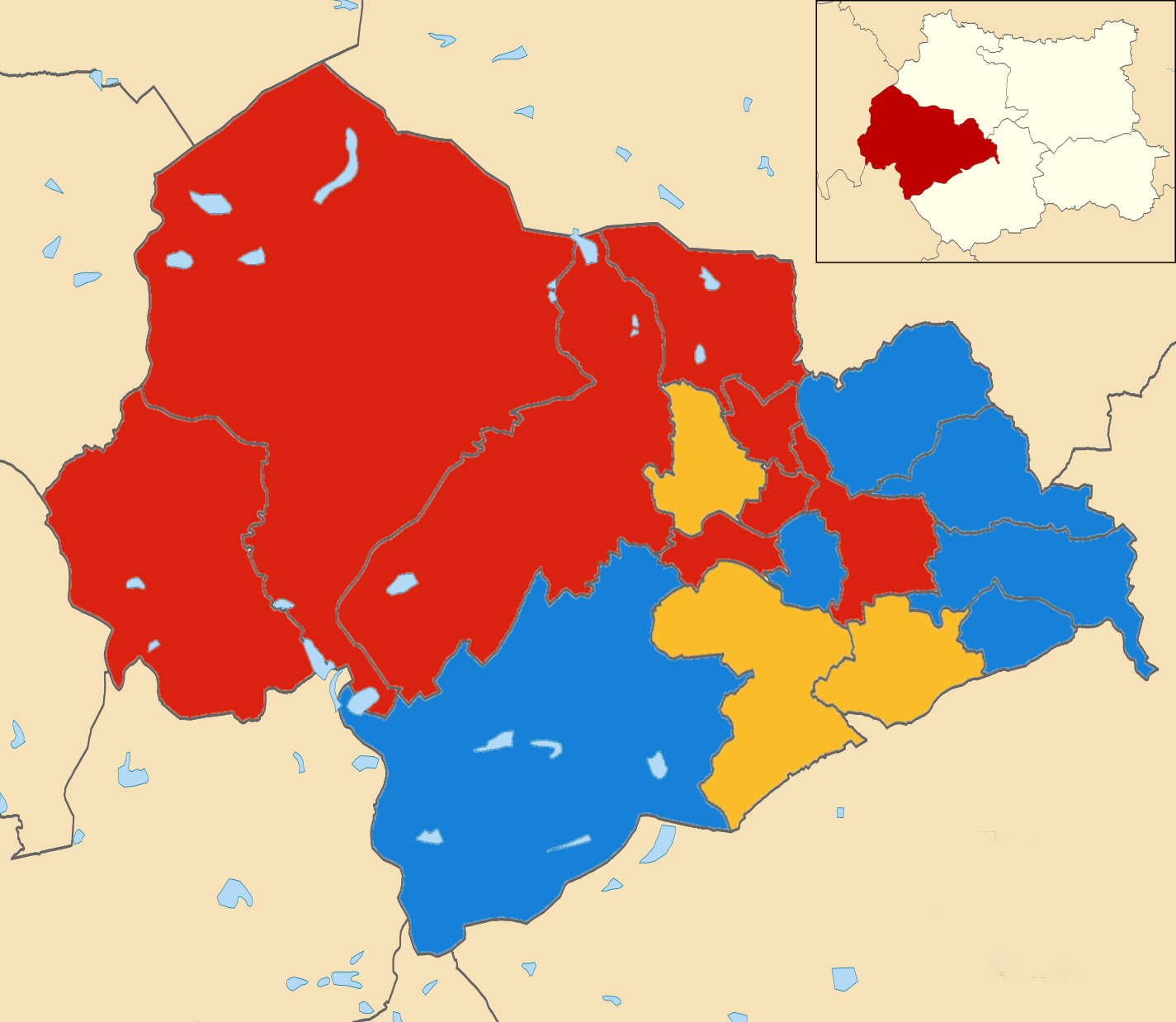
2016 local election results in Calderdale

The 2016 Calderdale Metropolitan Borough Council election took place on 5 May 2016 to elect members of Calderdale Metropolitan Borough Council in England. This was on the same day as other local elections. One councillor was elected in each ward for a four-year term so the councillors elected in 2016 last stood for election in 2012. Each ward is represented by three councillors, the election of which is staggered, so only one third of the councillors was elected in this election. Before the election there was no overall control with a minority Labour administration. After the election there was still no overall control so the minority Labour administration continued.

In July 2016 Councillor Rob Holden of Ryburn Ward was suspended from the Conservative Party after he made a request for an independent financial audit of the Calder Valley Conservative Association. This led to a criminal investigation into the financial irregularities at the association. He retained his seat on the council as an independent.

A by-election was held on 6 April 2017 in the Hipperholme and Lightcliffe ward after the sudden death of Councillor Graham Hall in January 2017. The seat was held by the Conservative Party with George Robinson winning the seat.

By-elections were held on 8 June 2017 in the Rastrick ward and Todmorden ward after the resignation of Rastrick Councillor Lynne Mitchell and Todmorden Councillor Jayne Booth. Rastrick ward was held by the Conservative Party with the election of Sophie Whittaker and Todmorden ward was held by the Labour Party with the election of Carol Machell.

In April 2018 Councillor Mike Payne of Sowerby Bridge Ward was suspended from the Conservative Party pending an investigation by the party after it was discovered that he had shared an article on Twitter in 2013 which called Muslims "parasites". He was not investigated by Calderdale Council as he was not a councillor at the time of the Tweets. He retained his seat on the council as an independent Conservative. He was later reinstated into the party.

== Council results ==
2016 Calderdale Metropolitan Borough Council election C
Party	Candidates						Votes		
Party	Stood	Elected	Gained	Unseated	Net	% of total	%	No.	Net %
Labour	17	8	1	2	▼1	47.1	37.9	21,115	▼2.2
Conservative	17	6	1	0	▲1	35.3	29.9	16,697	▼0.8
Liberal Democrats	17	3	1	1	Steady	17.6	15.4	8,588	▼4.3
UKIP	9	0	0	0	Steady	0.0	6.9	3,842	▲6.9
Green	17	0	0	0	Steady	0.0	5.1	2,844	▲1.3
Independent	3	0	0	0	Steady	0.0	3.3	1,847	▼0.4
Yorkshire First	4	0	0	0	Steady	0.0	0.8	447	▲0.8
National Front	1	0	0	0	Steady	0.0	0.1	77	▲0.1
TUSC	1	0	0	0	Steady	0.0	0.0	21	▼0.5

== Council Composition ==
Prior to the election the composition of the council was:

↓
24	21	5	1
Labour	Conservative	Lib Dem	Ind

After the election the composition of the council was:

↓
23	22	5	1
Labour	Conservative	Lib Dem	Ind

Party	Previous council	New council
Labour	24	23
Conservative	21	22
Liberal Democrats	5	5
Independent	1	1
Total	51	51

== Ward results ==
The list of persons nominated were announced by the council once they closed on 7 April 2016. The ward results listed below are based on the changes from the last time this third was up for election, in the 2012 elections, not taking into account any mid-term by-elections or party defections.

=== Brighouse ward ===
Brighouse
Party	Candidate	Votes	%	±%
Conservative	Colin Bryan Peel	1,290	41.5	−0.8
Labour	Ann Martin	1,045	33.6	−13.5
UKIP	Nick Yates	521	16.7	+16.7
Liberal Democrats	Jennie Dawn Rigg	132	4.2	−5.6
Green	John Richard Ward Nesbitt	89	2.9	+2.9
TUSC	Samuel George Webb	21	0.7	+0.7
Majority		245	7.9	+3.1
Turnout		3,111	37.6	+4.9
Conservative gain from Labour		Swing	6.3	

The incumbent was Ann Martin for the Labour Party.

=== Calder ward ===
Calder
Party	Candidate	Votes	%	±%
Labour	Josh Fenton-Glynn	2,310	49.9	+14.4
Liberal Democrats	Janet Mary Battye	1,424	30.7	−8.4
Green	Jennifer Mary Shepherd	444	9.6	−3.6
Conservative	James Ananda Krishnapillai	438	9.5	−2.2
Majority		886	19.1	+15.6
Turnout		4,632	50.6	+5.7
Labour gain from Liberal Democrats		Swing	11.3	

The incumbent was Janet Battye for the Liberal Democrats.

=== Elland ward ===
Elland
Party	Candidate	Votes	%	±%
Liberal Democrats	Pat Allen	1,334	43.4	+7.0
Conservative	George Andrew Robinson	676	22.0	−0.8
Labour	Mohammad Naeem	546	17.8	−14.0
UKIP	Mick Clarke	414	13.5	+13.5
Green	Katherine Maeve Sweeny	92	3.0	−5.6
Majority		658	21.4	+16.8
Turnout		3,071	36.5	+5.6
Liberal Democrats hold		Swing	10.5	

The incumbent was Pat Allen for the Liberal Democrats. The swing is expressed between the Liberal Democrats & Labour as Labour was second in 2012.

=== Greetland & Stainland ward ===
Greetland & Stainland
Party	Candidate	Votes	%	±%
Liberal Democrats	Paul Alexander Bellenger	1,195	38.4	−3.0
Conservative	Christopher Richard Blakey	996	32.0	+4.2
Labour	James Stephen Hepplestone	384	12.3	+1.3
UKIP	Paul Graham Rogan	350	11.3	+11.3
Green	Mark Richard Mullany	118	3.8	−7.2
Yorkshire First	Christopher Wade Clinton	60	1.9	+1.9
Majority		199	6.4	−7.3
Turnout		3,111	37.2	+5.3
Liberal Democrats hold		Swing	-3.6	

The incumbent was Malcolm James for the Liberal Democrats who stood down at this election.

=== Hipperholme & Lightcliffe ward ===
Hipperholme & Lightcliffe
Party	Candidate	Votes	%	±%
Conservative	Graham Thomas Hall	1,998	64.2	+21.4
Labour	Kashif Ali	526	16.9	−8.5
Liberal Democrats	Alisdair Calder McGregor	319	10.3	+6.9
Green	Susan Jane Wardell	249	8.0	+8.0
Majority		1,472	47.3	+34.6
Turnout		3,110	35.3	0.0
Conservative hold		Swing	14.0	

The incumbent was Graham Hall for the Conservative Party. Second place in 2012 was an independent, so the swing which is expressed between Conservative & Labour is significantly increased by the Conservatives regaining the votes which went to the independent in 2012.

=== Illingworth & Mixenden ward ===
Illingworth & Mixenden
Party	Candidate	Votes	%	±%
Labour	Lisa Ruth Lambert	1,347	48.5	+7.7
Conservative	Steven Leigh	688	24.8	+2.4
UKIP	Angela Stella Thompson	576	20.7	+20.7
Green	Tessa Gordziejko	59	2.1	+2.1
Independent	Sean Loftus	49	1.8	−33.0
Liberal Democrats	Glen Michael Mattock	43	1.5	−0.2
Majority		659	23.7	+15.2
Turnout		2,776	31.0	−1.7
Labour hold		Swing	2.7	

The incumbent was Lisa Lambert for the Labour Party. The swing is between Labour & Conservative. Second place in 2012 was an Ex-BNP councillor and no BNP candidate stood in 2016.

=== Luddendenfoot ward ===
Luddendenfoot
Party	Candidate	Votes	%	±%
Labour	Jane Scullion	1,363	40.1	−1.2
Conservative	Owen Idris Gilroy	866	25.5	−1.4
Liberal Democrats	Karl Antony Boggis	604	17.8	−13.2
UKIP	Christopher Michael Baksa	322	9.5	+9.5
Green	Pete Darren Lucky Leigh Pitfield	131	3.9	+3.9
Yorkshire First	Rod Sutcliffe	109	3.2	+3.2
Majority		497	14.6	+4.3
Turnout		3,400	42.7	+4.8
Labour hold		Swing	0.1	

The incumbent was Simon Young for the Labour Party who stood down at this election. The swing is expressed between Labour & Conservative although the Liberal Democrats were second in 2012.

=== Northowram & Shelf ward ===
Northowram & Shelf
Party	Candidate	Votes	%	±%
Conservative	Peter Caffrey	1,929	60.5	+3.9
Labour	Gary Walsh	791	24.8	−11.5
Yorkshire First	Daniel Richard Manning	222	7.0	+7.0
Green	Elaine Hey	154	4.8	+4.8
Liberal Democrats	Michael Francis Taylor	81	2.5	−3.5
Majority		1,138	35.7	+15.4
Turnout		3,189	35.6	+2.5
Conservative hold		Swing	7.7	

The incumbent was Peter Caffrey for the Conservative Party.

=== Ovenden ward ===
Ovenden
Party	Candidate	Votes	%	±%
Labour	Anne Collins	1,142	59.7	−8.4
Conservative	John Charles Shoesmith	433	22.6	+2.7
Green	Katherine Louise Horner	225	11.8	+11.8
Liberal Democrats	Mat Bowles	92	4.8	−5.3
Majority		709	37.1	−11.1
Turnout		1,912	23.0	+1.2
Labour hold		Swing	-5.6	

The incumbent was Anne Collins for the Labour Party.

=== Park ward ===
Park
Party	Candidate	Votes	%	±%
Labour	Jenny Lynn	2,734	70.7	+7.1
Independent	Chaudhary Mohammed Saghir	637	16.5	+16.5
Conservative	Jeff Featherstone	252	6.5	−13.6
Green	Charles Gate	104	2.7	+2.7
Liberal Democrats	John Dennis Reynolds	97	2.5	−13.1
Majority		2,097	54.2	+10.7
Turnout		3,867	43.27	−2.8
Labour hold		Swing	-4.7	

The incumbent was Jenny Lynn for the Labour Party.

=== Rastrick ward ===
Rastrick
Party	Candidate	Votes	%	±%
Conservative	Lynne Louise Mitchell	1,457	48.1	−1.7
Labour	Peter Judge	1,160	38.3	−1.5
Liberal Democrats	Kathy Haigh-Hutchinson	209	6.9	+6.9
Green	Elizabeth Jane King	172	5.7	+5.7
Majority		297	9.8	−0.3
Turnout		3,027	37.1	+6.5
Conservative hold		Swing	-0.1	

The incumbent was Ann McAllister for the Conservative Party who stood down at this election.

=== Ryburn ward ===
Ryburn
Party	Candidate	Votes	%	±%
Conservative	Geraldine Mary Carter	1,258	35.4	−9.5
Independent	Peter John Hunt	1,161	32.7	+32.7
Labour	Steve Cliberon	820	23.1	−10.7
Green	Freda Mary Davis	174	4.9	−7.6
Liberal Democrats	Rosemary Mabel Tatchell	131	3.7	−4.5
Majority		97	2.7	−8.3
Turnout		3,555	40.8	9.2
Conservative hold		Swing	0.6	

The incumbent was Geraldine Carter for the Conservative Party. The swing is expressed between Conservative & Labour presuming the independent candidate has taken votes from both sides and by increasing turnout.

=== Skircoat ward ===
Skircoat
Party	Candidate	Votes	%	±%
Conservative	John Cecil David Hardy	1,660	44.0	+3.0
Labour	Dave Draycott	1,113	29.5	+8.2
Liberal Democrats	Stephen Alexander Gow	507	13.4	−16.9
UKIP	Geoffrey Thompson	293	7.8	+7.8
Green	Eric Dolphy Fabrizi	136	3.6	−3.3
Yorkshire First	Darren Stansfield	56	1.5	+1.5
Majority		547	14.5	+3.7
Turnout		3,775	40.4	+2.0
Conservative hold		Swing	-2.6	

The incumbent was John Hardy for the Conservative Party. The swing is expressed from Labour to Conservative though the more significant swing is 12.5% from Liberal Democrat (who were second in 2012) to Labour.

=== Sowerby Bridge ward ===
Sowerby Bridge
Party	Candidate	Votes	%	±%
Labour	Adam David Wilkinson	1,611	49.4	−3.1
Conservative	Robb Oddy	911	28.0	−10.8
UKIP	Roy Charles Thompson	432	13.3	+13.3
Liberal Democrats	Tom Stringfellow	161	4.9	−7.3
Green	Karen Elizabeth Levin	131	4.0	+4.0
Majority		700	21.5	+2.8
Turnout		3,259	38.5	+6.5
Labour hold		Swing	1.4	

The incumbent was Adam Wilkinson for the Labour Party. The biggest swing was 9.5% from Conservative to UKIP.

=== Todmorden ward ===
Todmorden
Party	Candidate	Votes	%	±%
Labour	Steve Sweeney	1,578	45.8	10.6
Conservative	Gilbert John Hector Gregory	753	21.8	+2.7
Liberal Democrats	Joe Rez	381	11.0	−17.7
Green	Alan Patrick McDonald	333	9.7	+1.6
UKIP	Philip Anthony Walters	309	9.0	+9.0
National Front	Chris Jackson	77	2.2	+2.2
Majority		825	23.9	+17.4
Turnout		3,449	39.0	+4.7
Labour hold		Swing	14.1	

The incumbent was Steve Sweeney for the Labour Party. The swing is expressed between Labour and the Liberal Democrats who were second in 2012. The swing between Labour and Conservative was 3.9% towards Labour. The National Front percentage change is listed as +2.2% as there was no National Front candidate in 2012, it is by comparison 6.2% down compared to the showing of another far-right party The British Peoples Party in 2012.

=== Town ward ===
Town
Party	Candidate	Votes	%	±%
Labour	Megan Kathleen Swift	1,283	47.8	−15.2
UKIP	Phillip Spencer Charlton	625	23.3	+23.3
Conservative	Mark Llewellyn Edwards	571	21.3	−4.8
Green	Sarah Louise Moakler	116	4.3	+4.3
Liberal Democrats	Ruth Coleman-Taylor	78	2.9	−6.4
Majority		658	24.5	−12.3
Turnout		2,682	30.9	+5.8
Labour hold		Swing	-19.2	

The incumbent was Megan Swift for the Labour Party. The swing is shown as 19.2% from Labour to UKIP who did not stand in 2012. The swing between Labour & Conservatives who were second in 2012 is 5.2% from Labour to Conservative.

=== Warley ward ===
Warley
Party	Candidate	Votes	%	±%
Liberal Democrats	Ashley John Richard Evans	1,800	46.9	+9.8
Labour	Surraya Bibi	1,362	35.5	−5.3
Conservative	Tony Fall	521	13.6	−7.7
Green	Hena Chowdhury	117	3.1	+3.1
Majority		438	11.4	+7.8
Turnout		3,834	43.2	+7.7
Liberal Democrats gain from Labour		Swing	7.5	

The incumbent was Martin Burton for the Labour Party who stood down at this election.

== By-elections between 2016 and 2018 ==
=== Hipperholme and Lightcliffe ward, 2017 ===
Hipperholme and Lightcliffe By-Election 6 April 2017
Party	Candidate	Votes	%	±%
Conservative	George Andrew Robinson	1,483	60.21	
Liberal Democrats	Alisdair Calder McGregor	420	17.05	
Labour	Oliver George Willows	407	16.52	
Green	Elaine Hey	150	6.09	
Majority		1,063	43.16	
Turnout		2,463	27.82	
Conservative hold		Swing		

=== Rastrick ward, 2017 ===
Rastrick By-Election 8 June 2017
Party	Candidate	Votes	%	±%
Conservative	Sophie Jane Whittaker	2,929	49.28	
Labour	Colin Hugh Hutchinson	2,466	41.49	
Liberal Democrats	Kathy Haigh-Hutchinson	298	5.01	
Green	Barry Edward Crossland	229	3.85	
Majority		463	7.79	
Turnout		5,944	70.66	
Conservative hold		Swing		

=== Todmorden ward, 2017 ===
Todmorden By-Election 8 June 2017
Party	Candidate	Votes	%	±%
Labour	Carol Ann Machell	3,648	54.78	
Conservative	Gilbert John Hector Gregory	2,076	31.18	
Liberal Democrats	Donal Antony Martin O'Hanlon	448	6.73	
Green	Angharad Lois Turner	446	6.70	
Majority		1,572	23.61	
Turnout		6,659	71.82	
Labour hold		Swing		
