= 2002 Calderdale Metropolitan Borough Council election =

2002 UK local government election

- 2 May 2002

18 of 54 seats on Calderdale Metropolitan Borough Council 28 seats needed for a majority

	First party	Second party	Third party
Party	Conservative	Liberal Democrats	Labour
Seats won	6	5	7
Seats after	25	15	13
Seat change	▼3
Leader before election
Conservative
Leader after election
Conservative

Elections to Calderdale Metropolitan Borough Council were held on 2 May 2002. One third of the council was up for election and the Conservative Party lost overall control of the council to no overall control. The total turnout of the election was 32.16% (47,091 voters of an electorate of 146,407). The winning candidate in each ward is highlighted in bold.

After the election, the composition of the council was:

- Conservative 25
- Liberal Democrats 15
- Labour 13
- Independent 1

== Ward results ==
=== Brighouse ward ===
Brighouse ward
Party	Candidate	Votes	%	±%
Labour	**Edith Ann Martin**	913	35.80	
Conservative	Michael Raine	899	35.25	
Independent	Rodney Allen	738	28.94	
Majority		14		
Turnout		2,550	33.07	
Labour **hold**		Swing		

=== Calder Valley ward ===
Calder Valley ward
Party	Candidate	Votes	%	±%
Liberal Democrats	**Julie Dower**	1,269	38.51	
Labour	Michael Peter Towl	986	29.92	
Conservative	Helen Jane Granton	583	17.69	
Green	Jamie Johnson	457	13.86	
Majority		283		
Turnout		3,295	36.15	
Liberal Democrats **hold**		Swing		

=== Elland ward ===
Elland ward
Party	Candidate	Votes	%	±%
Liberal Democrats	**Edgar Joseph Waller**	1,402	60.22	
Labour	Stephen Wood	557	23.92	
Conservative	Howard Geofferey Seed	369	15.85	
Majority		845		
Turnout		2,328	29.11	
Liberal Democrats **hold**		Swing		

=== Greetland and Stainland ward ===
Greetland and Stainland ward
Party	Candidate	Votes	%	±%
Liberal Democrats	**Patrick Julyan Lancelot Napier Phillips**	2,129	64.53	
Conservative	Paul Graham Rogan	736	22.30	
Labour	Nigel Patrick Ambler	434	13.15	
Majority		1,393		
Turnout		3,299	34.57	
Liberal Democrats **hold**		Swing		

=== Hipperholme and Lightcliffe ward ===
Hipperholme and Lightcliffe ward
Party	Candidate	Votes	%	±%
Conservative	**John Foran**	1,579	60.91	
Labour	Paul Womersley	693	26.73	
Liberal Democrats	Elisabeth Mary Wilson	320	12.34	
Majority		886		
Turnout		2,592	32.58	
Conservative **hold**		Swing		

=== Illingworth ward ===
Illingworth ward
Party	Candidate	Votes	%	±%
Labour	**Thomas Joseph McElroy**	945	52.88	
Conservative	Michael John Clarke	613	34.30	
Liberal Democrats	David Robinson	229	12.81	
Majority		332		
Turnout		1,787	26.14	
Labour **hold**		Swing		

=== Luddendenfoot ward ===
Luddendenfoot ward
Party	Candidate	Votes	%	±%
Liberal Democrats	**Jane Frances Leech Brown**	1,529	51.01	
Labour	Stewart Brown	674	22.48	
Conservative	Robert Ernest Thornber	551	18.38	
Green	Steven Richard Hutton	243	8.10	
Majority		855		
Turnout		2,997	35.09	
Liberal Democrats **hold**		Swing		

=== Mixenden ward ===
Mixenden ward
Party	Candidate	Votes	%	±%
Labour	**Andy Metcalfe**	758	44.24	
Independent	Redmond Mellett	393	22.94	
Conservative	Sajid Mehmood	367	21.42	
Liberal Democrats	Tracie Anne Quinn-Robinson	195	11.38	
Majority		375		
Turnout		1,713	24.28	
Labour **hold**		Swing		

=== Northowram and Shelf ward ===
Northowram and Shelf ward
Party	Candidate	Votes	%	±%
Conservative	**Roger Laurence Taylor**	1,756	62.80	
Labour	Derek Fox Haviour	725	25.92	
Liberal Democrats	Margaret Stafford	315	11.26	
Majority		1031		
Turnout		2,796	32.35	
Conservative **hold**		Swing		

=== Ovenden ward ===
Ovenden ward
Party	Candidate	Votes	%	±%
Labour	**Helen Josephine Rivron**	768	47.79	
Liberal Democrats	Pamela Elizabeth Burton	602	37.46	
Conservative	John Charles Shoesmith	237	14.74	
Majority		166		
Turnout		1,607	22.09	
Labour **hold**		Swing		

=== Rastrick ward ===
Rastrick ward
Party	Candidate	Votes	%	±%
Conservative	**Gareth Paul Henderson**	1,150	43.96	
Labour	George Edward Richardson	822	31.42	
Independent	Peter Graham Davis	443	16.93	
Liberal Democrats	Glen Michael Mattock	201	7.68	
Majority		328		
Turnout		2,616	32.49	
Conservative **hold**		Swing		

=== Ryburn ward ===
Ryburn ward
Party	Candidate	Votes	%	±%
Conservative	**Geraldine Mary Carter**	1,257	42.40	
Labour	Judith Mary Gannon	992	33.46	
Liberal Democrats	Anthony Crowther	715	24.12	
Majority		265		
Turnout		2,964	32.45	
Conservative **hold**		Swing		

=== St John's ward ===
St John's ward
Party	Candidate	Votes	%	±%
Labour	**Arshad Mahmood**	1,467	46.42	
Conservative	Shakar Saghir	1,059	33.51	
Liberal Democrats	Andrew John Foster	634	20.06	
Majority		408		
Turnout		3,160	39.55	
Labour **gain** from Conservative		Swing		

=== Skircoat ward ===
Skircoat ward
Party	Candidate	Votes	%	±%
Conservative	**Geoffrey Wainwright**	1,855	63.81	
Labour	Catherine Mary Groves	621	21.36	
Liberal Democrats	Siobhen Stow	431	14.82	
Majority		1,234		
Turnout		2,907	33.83	
Conservative **hold**		Swing		

=== Sowerby Bridge ward ===
Sowerby Bridge ward
Party	Candidate	Votes	%	±%
Labour	**Anne Marsden**	975	42.89	
Conservative	Marian McCartney	826	36.33	
Liberal Democrats	Sheila Ann Ashton	472	20.76	
Majority		149		
Turnout		2,273	29.45	
Labour **gain** from Conservative		Swing		

=== Todmorden ward ===
Todmorden ward
Party	Candidate	Votes	%	±%
Liberal Democrats	**Ann Clare Townley**	1,231	47.03	
Labour	Joe Mitchell	938	35.84	
Conservative	Craig Whittaker	448	17.11	
Majority		293		
Turnout		2,617	33.72	
Liberal Democrats **hold**		Swing		

=== Town ward ===
Town ward
Party	Candidate	Votes	%	±%
Labour	**Megan Kathleen Swift**	1,155	40.46	
Conservative	Stephen Baines	949	33.25	
Liberal Democrats	John Durkin	510	17.86	
Independent	Gwyneth Greenwood	240	8.40	
Majority		206		
Turnout		2,854	32.74	
Labour **gain** from Conservative		Swing		

=== Warley ward ===
Warley ward
Party	Candidate	Votes	%	±%
Conservative	**David Ian Ginley**	1,550	56.65	
Labour	Pauline Margaret Leach	749	27.37	
Liberal Democrats	Robert Andrew Pearson	437	15.97	
Majority		801		
Turnout		2,736	35.22	
Conservative **hold**		Swing		

== By-elections between 2002 and 2003 ==
=== Calder Valley ward, 2002 ===
Calder Valley By-Election 5 December 2002
Party	Candidate	Votes	%	±%
**Liberal Democrats**	**Janet Battye**	**883**	**45.8**	**+7.3**
Labour	Michael Towl	448	23.2	−6.7
Conservative	Craig Whittaker	364	18.9	+1.2
Green	Jamie Johnson	235	12.2	−1.7
Majority		435	22.6	
Turnout		1,930	22.0	
Liberal Democrats **hold**		Swing		

=== Mixenden ward, 2003 ===
Mixenden By-Election 23 January 2003
Party	Candidate	Votes	%	±%
**BNP**	**Adrian Marsden**	**679**	**29.2**	**+29.2**
Liberal Democrats	Stephen Pearson	651	28.0	+16.6
Labour	Michael Higgins	641	27.5	−16.7
Conservative	Stephen Baines	214	9.2	−12.2
Independent	Redmond Mellett	142	6.1	−16.8
Majority		28	1.2	
Turnout		2,327	37.0	
BNP **gain** from Labour		Swing		

=== Rastrick ward, 2003 ===
Rastrick By-Election 6 February 2003
Party	Candidate	Votes	%	±%
**Conservative**	**Paul Rogan**	**722**	**44.4**	**+0.4**
Labour	George Richardson	492	30.3	−1.1
Liberal Democrats	John Durkin	411	25.3	+17.6
Majority		230	14.1	
Turnout		1,625	20.6	
Conservative **hold**		Swing		
