= 1999 Calderdale Metropolitan Borough Council election =

1999 UK local government election

Elections to Calderdale Metropolitan Borough Council were held on 6 May 1999. One third of the council was up for election and the Labour Party lost overall control of the council to no overall control. The overall turnout of the election was 30.09% (44,215 voters of an electorate of 146,944). The winning candidate in each ward is highlighted in bold.

After the election, the composition of the council was:

- Labour 20
- Conservative 19
- Liberal Democrats 14
- Independent 1

== Ward results ==
=== Brighouse ward ===
Brighouse ward
Party	Candidate	Votes	%	±%
Labour	**Dorothy Helen Anderson**	1,156	55.57	
Conservative	Thiruvenkatar Krishnapillai	924	44.42	
Majority		232		
Turnout		2,080	27.85	

=== Calder Valley ward ===
Calder Valley ward
Party	Candidate	Votes	%	±%
Liberal Democrats	**Michael Francis Taylor**	1,440	45.77	
Labour	Matthew James Talbot	1,001	31.81	
Conservative	James Albert Fuke	372	11.82	
Green	Graham Wilfred Yelland	333	10.58	
Majority		439		
Turnout		3,146	34.63	

=== Elland ward ===
Elland ward
Party	Candidate	Votes	%	±%
Liberal Democrats	**Margaret Riley**	1,538	62.80	
Labour	Baldev Singh Gill	598	24.41	
Conservative	Michael John Clarke	313	12.78	
Majority		940		
Turnout		2,449	30.37	

=== Greetland and Stainland ward ===
Greetland and Stainland ward
Party	Candidate	Votes	%	±%
Liberal Democrats	**David Trevor Shutt**	1,953	67.46	
Conservative	Keith Smith	676	23.35	
Labour	Salamat Aliata	266	9.18	
Majority		1,277		
Turnout		2,895	31.3	

=== Hipperholme and Lightcliffe ward ===
Hipperholme and Lightcliffe
Party	Candidate	Votes	%	±%
Conservative	**Graham Thomas Hall**	1,680	66.69	
Labour	Keith John Butterick	839	33.30	
Majority		841		
Turnout		2,519	31.73	

=== Illingworth ward ===
Illingworth ward
Party	Candidate	Votes	%	±%
Labour	**Patricia Mary Abrahams**	664	42.13	
Conservative	Geoffrey James Wallace	607	38.51	
Liberal Democrats	Janet Mary Sherrard-Smith	202	12.81	
BNP	Richard Mulhall	103	6.53	
Majority		57		
Turnout		1,576	22.36	

=== Luddendenfoot ward ===
Luddendenfoot ward
Party	Candidate	Votes	%	±%
Liberal Democrats	**Christine Irene Bampton-Smith**	1,184	48.13	
Labour	Freda Mary Davis	643	26.13	
Conservative	Charmain Vivienne Smith	464	18.86	
Green	Mark Richard Hill	169	6.86	
Majority		541		
Turnout		2,460	28.7	

=== Mixenden ward ===
Mixenden ward
Party	Candidate	Votes	%	±%
Labour	**Robert George Metcalfe**	813	54.67	
Conservative	Sally Victoria McCartney	491	33.01	
Green	Paul Martin Coe	63	4.23	
Independent	Sean Vincent Loftus	61	4.10	
BNP	Stuart Hall	59	3.96	
Majority		322		
Turnout		1,487	20.32	

=== Northowram and Shelf ward ===
Northowram and Shelf ward
Party	Candidate	Votes	%	±%
Conservative	**William Charles Albert Carpenter**	1,720	66.58	
Labour	Keith Lucas	573	22.18	
Liberal Democrats	Patricia Hirst	290	11.22	
Majority		1,147		
Turnout		2,583	29.93	

=== Ovenden ward ===
Ovenden ward
Party	Candidate	Votes	%	±%
Labour	**Linda June Riordan**	898	64.93	
Conservative	Maria Constantino	399	28.85	
BNP	Rachel Clarke	86	6.21	
Majority		499		
Turnout		1,383	19.02	

=== Rastrick ward ===
Rastrick ward
Party	Candidate	Votes	%	±%
Conservative	**John Clarence Williamson**	1,268	56.83	
Labour	George Edward Richardson	963	43.16	
Majority		305		
Turnout		2,231	27.8	

=== Ryburn ward ===
Ryburn ward
Party	Candidate	Votes	%	±%
Conservative	**Raynor Wilson Booth**	1,228	46.47	
Labour	Judith Mary Gannon	803	30.39	
Liberal Democrats	Margaret Elizabeth White	611	23.12	
Majority		425		
Turnout		2,642	28.59	

=== Skircoat ward ===
Skircoat ward
Party	Candidate	Votes	%	±%
Conservative	**Grenville Horsfall**	1,693	61.56	
Labour	Elizabeth Jill Smith	578	21.01	
Liberal Democrats	Judith Madeleine Harrison	345	12.54	
Green	Howard Smith	134	4.87	
Majority		1,115		
Turnout		2,750	31.9	

=== Sowerby Bridge ward ===
Sowerby Bridge
Party	Candidate	Votes	%	±%
Conservative	**Andrew David Feather**	1,060	46.24	
Labour	Richard Harvey Ward	874	38.13	
Liberal Democrats	Nicholas Allen Edwards	358	15.61	
Majority		186		
Turnout		2,292	29.7	

=== St John's ward ===
St John's ward
Party	Candidate	Votes	%	±%
Labour	**Mohammed Najib**	1,493	43.91	
Conservative	Zafar Iqbal-Din	1,093	32.14	
Liberal Democrats	William Mark Harrison	601	17.67	
BNP	Adrian Paul Marsden	213	6.26	
Majority		400		
Turnout		3,400	41.83	

=== Todmorden ward ===
Todmorden ward
Party	Candidate	Votes	%	±%
Liberal Democrats	**Jason Paul Jeffrey**	1,187	43.65	
Labour	Peter Oskar George Ehrhardt	1,043	38.35	
Conservative	Philip Norman Brown	352	12.94	
Green	Charles Gate	137	5.03	
BNP	Christian Michael Jackson	78	2.86	
Majority		144		
Turnout		2,719	35.45	

=== Town ward ===
Town ward
Party	Candidate	Votes	%	±%
Conservative	**Adrian Christopher O'Connor**	1,121	41.71	
Labour	Dawn Neal	920	34.23	
Liberal Democrats	John Durkin	453	16.85	
Independent	Gwyneth Greenwood	193	7.18	
Majority		201		
Turnout		2,687	30.55	

=== Warley ward ===
Warley ward
Party	Candidate	Votes	%	±%
Conservative	**Kathleen Young**	1,335	47.04	
Labour	Paul Anthony Wyatt	1,118	39.39	
Liberal Democrats	Robert Andrew Pearson	385	13.56	
Majority		217		
Turnout		2,838	36.0	

== By-elections between 1999 and 2000 ==
=== Elland ward, 1999 ===
Elland By-Election 29 October 1999
Party	Candidate	Votes	%	±%
**Liberal Democrats**	**Patricia Allen**	**864**	**59.5**	**−3.3**
Labour	George Richardson	391	26.9	+2.5
Conservative	Michael Clarke	198	13.6	+0.8
Majority		473	32.6	
Turnout		1,453	18.1	
Liberal Democrats **hold**		Swing		
