= 2008 Calderdale Metropolitan Borough Council election =

2008 UK local government election

- 1 May 2008

17 of 51 seats on Calderdale Metropolitan Borough Council 26 seats needed for a majority

	First party	Second party	Third party
Party	Conservative	Liberal Democrats	Labour
Seats before	18	17	11
Seats won	8	6	3
Seats after	20	17	9
Seat change	▲2		▼2
Leader before election
Conservative
Leader after election
Conservative

2008 local election results in Calderdale

Elections to Calderdale Metropolitan Borough Council were held on 1 May 2008. One third of the council was up for election and the council stayed under no overall control with a minority Conservative administration.

On 9 May, about a week after being elected as a Liberal Democrat, Greetland and Stainland Councillor Keith Watson left the Liberal Democrats and joined the Conservative Party.

In 2009 the Skircoat Councillor Geoffrey Wainwright died suddenly. A by-election was held on 2 April 2009. The seat was held by the Conservative Party with John Hardy winning the seat.

In June 2009 Elland Councillor Diane Park quit the Liberal Democrats due to the state of the party in the House of Commons. She continued as an independent.

== Council composition ==
Prior to the election the composition of the council was:

↓
18	17	11	3	1	1
Conservative	Lib Dem	Labour	Ind	BN	ED

After the election the composition of the council was:

↓
20	17	9	2	2	1
Conservative	Lib Dem	Labour	Ind	BN	ED

Party	Previous council	New council
Conservative	18	20
Liberal Democrats	17	17
Labour	11	9
Independent	3	2
BNP	1	2
English Democrat	1	1
Total	51	51

== Ward results ==
=== Brighouse ward ===
Brighouse ward
Party	Candidate	Votes	%	±%
Conservative	Howard Blagbrough	1,329	40.2	−3.5
Liberal Democrats	Nick Yates	1,250	37.8	−5.9
Labour	Ann Martin	729	22.0	−5.6
Majority		79		
Turnout		3,308	39.1	
Conservative gain from Liberal Democrats		Swing		

The incumbent was Nick Yates for the Liberal Democrats. He had been elected as a Conservative.

=== Calder ward ===
Calder ward
Party	Candidate	Votes	%	±%
Liberal Democrats	Janet Mary Battye	1,188	32.1	1.2
Labour Co-op	Janet Lynne Oosthuysen	1,135	30.7	+4.7
Conservative	Beverley Anne Carter	890	24.1	+3.6
Green	Ruby Rose Joy Berridge	486	13.1	−13.5
Majority		53		
Turnout		3,699	41.52	
Liberal Democrats hold		Swing		

The incumbent was Janet Battye for the Liberal Democrats.

=== Elland ward ===
Elland ward
Party	Candidate	Votes	%	±%
Liberal Democrats	Pat Allen	1,203	44.0	−9.4
Conservative	Christian Corkish	800	29.3	+2.7
Labour Co-op	Stewart Brown	312	11.4	−3.9
English Democrat	Mick Clarke	262	9.6	+9.6
Green	Susan Ann Thomas	156	5.7	+5.7
Majority		403		
Turnout		2,733	33.39	
Liberal Democrats hold		Swing		

The incumbent was Pat Allen for the Liberal Democrats.

=== Greetland and Stainland ward ===
Greetland and Stainland ward
Party	Candidate	Votes	%	±%
Liberal Democrats	Keith Watson	1,404	45.7	−1.6
Conservative	John Frank Brearley Ford	958	31.2	+3.8
Labour	Pamela Fellows	251	8.2	−5.5
BNP	Michael Hall	229	7.5	+7.5
Green	Mark Mullany	170	5.5	−6.1
English Democrat	Johnathan Paul Rogan	59	1.9	+1.9
Majority		446		
Turnout		3,071	36.68	
Liberal Democrats hold		Swing		

The incumbent was Keith Watson for the Liberal Democrats.

=== Hipperholme and Lightcliffe ward ===
Hipperholme and Lightcliffe ward
Party	Candidate	Votes	%	±%
Conservative	Graham Thomas Hall	2,209	68.5	+21.6
Liberal Democrats	Jim Souper	578	17.9	+9.5
Labour	Susan Press	438	13.6	−10.1
Majority		1,631		
Turnout		3,225	38.44	
Conservative hold		Swing		

The incumbent was Graham Hall for the Conservative Party

=== Illingworth and Mixenden ward ===
Illingworth and Mixenden ward
Party	Candidate	Votes	%	±%
BNP	Tom Bates	1,323	38.3	+7.9
Labour	Judy Gannon	1,014	29.4	−5.1
Conservative	Jon Shaw	796	23.1	−0.2
Liberal Democrats	Michael Murray Elder	193	5.6	−5.1
Independent	Sean Vincent Loftus	124	3.6	+3.6
Majority		309		
Turnout		3,450	37.12	
BNP gain from Labour		Swing		

The incumbent was Judith Gannon for the Labour Party.

=== Luddendenfoot ward ===
Luddendenfoot ward
Party	Candidate	Votes	%	±%
Liberal Democrats	Christine Irene Bampton-Smith	1,301	41.4	−0.9
Conservative	Sarah Jane Jennings	1,016	32.3	−0.3
Labour	James Edward Fearon	513	16.3	−3.3
BNP	John Derek Gregory	316	10.0	−8.3
Majority		285		
Turnout		3,146	40.97	
Liberal Democrats hold		Swing		

The incumbent was Christine Bampton-Smith for the Liberal Democrats.

=== Northowram and Shelf ward ===
Northowram and Shelf ward
Party	Candidate	Votes	%	±%
Conservative	Graham Edward Alexander Reason	1,745	49.0	−4.4
Labour Co-op	Gary Rae	524	14.7	−2.9
Independent	Raymond Pearson	387	10.9	+10.9
English Democrat	John William Dowson	343	9.6	+9.6
BNP	Chris Godridge	322	9.0	−14.5
Liberal Democrats	John Christopher Beacroft-Mitchell	240	6.7	−4.3
Majority		1,221		
Turnout		3,561	40.15	
Conservative hold		Swing		

The incumbent was Graham Reason for the Conservative Party.

=== Ovenden ward ===
Ovenden ward
Party	Candidate	Votes	%	±%
Labour Co-op	Danielle Sara Eleana Coombs	847	44.8	+4.1
BNP	Jane Shooter	564	29.8	+0.8
Conservative	John Cecil David Hardy	479	25.3	+12.0
Liberal Democrats	Malcolm Graham James	248	13.1	+0.7
Majority		283		
Turnout		1,890	25.38	
Labour Co-op hold		Swing		

The incumbent was Danielle Coombs for the Labour Party.

=== Park ward ===
Park ward
Party	Candidate	Votes	%	±%
Liberal Democrats	Mohammad Ilyas	1,838	41.3	+24.4
Labour	Mohammed Najib	1,678	37.7	−2.8
Conservative	Craig Anthony Stanton	489	11.0	−23.7
Independent	Shakar Saghir	442	9.9	−21.1
Majority		160		
Turnout		4,447	50.85	
Liberal Democrats gain from Labour		Swing		

The incumbent was Mohammed Najib for the Labour Party.

=== Rastrick ward ===
Rastrick ward
Party	Candidate	Votes	%	±%
Conservative	Ann McAllister	1,546	49.0	+1.0
Labour Co-op	George Edward Richardson	666	21.1	−9.6
English Democrat	David Vincent Stevenson	516	16.4	+16.4
Liberal Democrats	Philip Jeffery	425	13.5	−5.2
Majority		880		
Turnout		3,153	37.14	
Conservative hold		Swing		

The incumbent was Ann McAllister for the Conservative Party.

=== Ryburn ward ===
Ryburn ward
Party	Candidate	Votes	%	±%
Conservative	Geraldine Mary Carter	1,667	54.2	+7.3
Liberal Democrats	Ashley John Richard Evans	908	29.5	+3.7
Labour	Lesley Anne Sleigh	502	16.3	−11.3
Majority		759		
Turnout		3,077	36.05	
Conservative hold		Swing		

The incumbent was Geraldine Carter for the Conservative Party.

=== Skircoat ward ===
Skircoat ward
Party	Candidate	Votes	%	±%
Conservative	Geoffrey Wainwright	2,132	54.0	+1.6
Liberal Democrats	Pauline Nash	1,305	33.1	+10.9
Labour Co-op	Marion Simone Batten	308	7.8	−11.3
Green	Viv Smith	202	5.1	+5.1
Majority		827		
Turnout		3,947	42.21	
Conservative hold		Swing		

The incumbent was Geoffrey Wainwright for the Conservative Party.

=== Sowerby Bridge ward ===
Sowerby Bridge ward
Party	Candidate	Votes	%	±%
Conservative	Amanda Louise Byrne	1,252	42.6	+4.3
Labour Co-op	Dave Draycott	864	29.4	+4.7
Liberal Democrats	John Boje Frederiksen	365	12.4	−5.5
BNP	Stuart Brian Gill	357	12.1	−7.7
English Democrat	Tom Mathieson	103	3.5	3.5
Majority		388		
Turnout		2,941	35.73	
Conservative hold		Swing		

The incumbent was Amanda Byrne for the Conservative Party.

=== Todmorden ward ===
Todmorden ward
Party	Candidate	Votes	%	±%
Conservative	Ian Cooper	1,048	32.5	+2.2
Liberal Democrats	Hilary Alice Myers	912	28.3	−12.7
Labour	Steph Booth	853	26.5	−1.3
BNP	Christian Michael Jackson	408	12.7	+12.7
Majority		136		
Turnout		3,221	37.92	
Conservative gain from Liberal Democrats		Swing		

The incumbent was Anne Townley for the Liberal Democrats.

=== Town ward ===
Town ward
Party	Candidate	Votes	%	±%
Labour Co-op	Megan Kathleen Swift	1,055	39.5	+7.0
Conservative	Chris Pillai	649	24.3	+1.8
BNP	Anthony Bentley	403	15.1	−13.3
Independent	Robert Philip Andrew Reynolds	292	10.9	+10.9
Liberal Democrats	Brendan Robert Stubbs	273	10.2	−0.4
Majority		406		
Turnout		2,672	31.07	
Labour Co-op hold		Swing		

The incumbent was Megan Swift for the Labour Party.

=== Warley ward ===
Warley ward
Party	Candidate	Votes	%	±%
Liberal Democrats	Robert Pearson	1,681	51.8	+34.8
Conservative	Sally Victoria McCartney	708	21.8	−4.0
BNP	Paul Wadsworth	433	13.3	−6.8
Labour	Anne Collins	422	13.0	+0.8
Majority		973		
Turnout		3,244	38.05	
Liberal Democrats gain from Independent		Swing		

The incumbent was Allen Clegg as an Independent.

== By-elections between 2008 and 2010 ==
=== Skircoat ward, 2009 ===
Skircoat By-Election 2 April 2009
Party	Candidate	Votes	%	±%
Conservative	John Cecil David Hardy	1,327	36.78	
Liberal Democrats	Pauline Nash	1,209	33.51	
Labour	Anne Collins	274	7.59	
Independent	Paul Brannigan	238	6.60	
BNP	Chris Godridge	235	6.51	
Independent	Philip Maxwell Crossley	229	6.35	
Green	Viv Smith	92	2.55	
Majority		118	3.28	
Turnout		3,608	38.07	
Conservative hold		Swing		
