= 1973 Calderdale Metropolitan Borough Council election =

Election event in Metropolitan Borough

Calderdale Metropolitan Borough Council Elections, 1973
- 10 May 1973

Whole council (51) to Calderdale Metropolitan Borough Council 26 seats needed for a majority
	First party	Second party	Third party
Party	Labour	Conservative	Liberal
Seats won	28, 54.9%	18, 35.3%	5, 9.8%
Popular vote	65,232	63,428	30,147
Percentage	40.0%	38.9%	18.5%
Council control after election
Labour

The first elections to the newly created Calderdale Metropolitan Borough Council were held on 10 May 1973, with the entirety of the 51 seat council — three seats for each of the 17 wards — up for election. The Local Government Act 1972 stipulated that the elected members were to shadow and eventually take over from the predecessor corporation on 1 April 1974. The order in which the councillors were elected dictated how long each served for, with third-place candidates serving two years and up for re-election in 1975, second-placed three years expiring in 1976, and first-placed serving five years until 1978.

As well as replacing the County Borough of Halifax, the new council included:

- Municipal Borough of Brighouse
- Municipal Borough of Todmorden
- Elland Urban District
- Hebden Royd Urban District
- Queensbury and Shelf Urban District (part)
- Ripponden Urban District
- Sowerby Bridge Urban District
- Hepton Rural District

The election resulted in Labour gaining control.

In May 1974 a by-election for the Brighouse ward occurred to replace the Conservative councillor G. Wood. The by-election was won by the Labour candidate M. Cunningham.

== Council results ==
Calderdale Borough Council election 1973
Party	Candidates						Votes		
Party	Stood	Elected	Gained	Unseated	Net	% of total	%	No.	Net %
Labour	49	28	-	-	-	54.9	40.0	65,232	-
Conservative	51	18	-	-	-	35.3	38.9	63,428	-
Liberal	31	5	-	-	-	9.8	18.5	30,147	-
Independent	3	0	-	-	-	0.0	1.5	2,479	-
Socialist	1	0	-	-	-	0.0	0.7	1,122	-
Ind. Conservative	1	0	-	-	-	0.0	0.3	482	-

== Council Composition ==
After the election the composition of the council was:

↓
28	18	5
Labour	Conservative	Liberal

Party	New council
Labour	28
Conservative	18
Liberal	5
Total	51

== Ward results ==
=== Brighouse ward ===
Brighouse ward
Party	Candidate	Votes	%	±%
Labour	M. Mitchell	2,325	46.8	−
Labour	S. Womersley	1,984		−
Conservative	G. Wood	1,519	30.6	−
Conservative	B. Newton	1,511		−
Labour	M. Cunningham	1,473		−
Conservative	C. Tinker	1,450		−
Socialist	S. Williams	1,122	22.6	−
Turnout			61.9	

=== Elland ward ===
Elland ward
Party	Candidate	Votes	%	±%
Conservative	K. Cawdry	1,355	35.4	−
Liberal	W. Ramsden	1,295	33.8	−
Labour	A. Nutton	1,178	30.8	−
Conservative	S. Taylor	998		−
Liberal	H. Fox	996		−
Liberal	D. Rabone	953		−
Labour	B. Firth	939		−
Labour	J. Heathcote	861		−
Conservative	G. Astwood	852		−
Turnout			51.8	

=== Greetland and Stainland ward ===
Greetland and Stainland ward
Party	Candidate	Votes	%	±%
Liberal	D. Shutt	1,358	45.3	−
Liberal	H. Howe	1,302		−
Liberal	N. Kemp	1,240		−
Labour	A. Lane	846	28.2	−
Conservative	M. Jones	797	26.6	−
Conservative	H. Tetlaw	730		−
Labour	K. Stacey	680		−
Labour	E. Bland	647		−
Conservative	E. Challenger	569		−
Turnout			51.6	

=== Hebden Bridge ward ===
Hebden Bridge ward
Party	Candidate	Votes	%	±%
Labour	F. Barker	2,379	39.2	−
Labour	G. Bryant	1,443		−
Labour	S. Leach	1,189		−
Conservative	M. Fisher	1,184	19.5	−
Liberal	D. Flethcer	1,178	19.4	−
Liberal	S. Yorke	1,149		−
Conservative	R. Helliwell	1,106		−
Liberal	T. Doyle	881		−
Independent	M. Sutherland	850	14.0	−
Independent	H. Knowles	812		−
Conservative	J. Price	736		−
Ind. Conservative	A. Stromberg	482	7.9	−
Turnout			63.9	

=== Illingworth ward ===
Illingworth ward
Party	Candidate	Votes	%	±%
Labour	I. Jones	996	46.0	−
Labour	W. Higgins	920		−
Labour	K. Lord	872		−
Conservative	C. Rooks	719	33.2	−
Conservative	M. Jagger	510		−
Conservative	G. Shaw	506		−
Liberal	F. Withey	451	20.8	−
Liberal	C. Guy	288		−
Liberal	R. Binns	250		−
Turnout			31.5	

=== Lightcliffe ward ===
Lightcliffe ward
Party	Candidate	Votes	%	±%
Conservative	W. Sharp	2,333	60.6	−
Conservative	R. Sunderland	2,309		−
Conservative	D. Crinall	2,244		−
Labour	W. Tankard	1,520	39.4	−
Labour	F. Stapleford	1,487		−
Labour	D. Wood	1,404		−
Turnout			40.6	

=== Mixenden ward ===
Mixenden ward
Party	Candidate	Votes	%	±%
Labour	G. Hall	978	65.5	−
Labour	D. Thompson	961		−
Labour	J. Thompson	906		−
Conservative	F. Mitchell	515	34.5	−
Conservative	T. Riddlesden	448		−
Conservative	M. Andrews	415		−
Turnout			23.6	

=== Northowram and Shelf ward ===
Northowram and Shelf ward
Party	Candidate	Votes	%	±%
Conservative	J. Bradley	1,473	42.9	−
Conservative	R. Conway	1,360		−
Conservative	C. Farrar	1,221		−
Liberal	S. Brownridge	1,146	33.3	−
Liberal	W. Stansfield	976		−
Liberal	R. Shaw	832		−
Labour	H. Thompson	818	23.8	−
Labour	D. Walters	663		−
Labour	W. Stubbings	663		−
Turnout			48.5	

=== Ovenden ward ===
Ovenden ward
Party	Candidate	Votes	%	±%
Labour	M. Jeffreys	1,685	60.1	−
Labour	J. Tolan	1,528		−
Labour	J. Thelwell	1,495		−
Conservative	T. Enderby	1,117	39.9	−
Conservative	H. Gresham	1,020		−
Conservative	E. Cavanagh	994		−
Turnout			29.3	

=== Rastrick ward ===
Rastrick ward
Party	Candidate	Votes	%	±%
Labour	E. Hions	1,763	51.3	−
Conservative	L. Hanson	1,672	48.7	−
Labour	F. Moss	1,670		−
Conservative	W. Furness	1,624		−
Labour	F. Clayton	1,558		−
Conservative	L. Hunt	1,557		−
Turnout			39.6	

=== Ryburn ward ===
Ryburn ward
Party	Candidate	Votes	%	±%
Conservative	G. Midgley	1,582	41.9	−
Conservative	D. Wood	1,308		−
Labour	A. Benbow	1,303	34.5	−
Conservative	J. Benson	1,232		−
Labour	E. Godfrey	990		−
Labour	J. Sutcliffe	938		−
Liberal	B. Glendinning	889	23.6	−
Liberal	R. Thompson	789		−
Liberal	J. Kafel	480		−
Turnout			45.0	

=== Skircoat ward ===
Skircoat ward
Party	Candidate	Votes	%	±%
Conservative	P. Waddington	2,009	42.5	−
Conservative	J. Tidswell	1,953		−
Conservative	J. Schofield	1,928		−
Liberal	P. Haley	1,375	29.1	−
Labour	L. Mitchell	1,345	28.4	−
Liberal	G. Binns	1,281		−
Liberal	A. Templeton	1,156		−
Turnout			49.5	

=== Sowerby North ward ===
Sowerby North ward
Party	Candidate	Votes	%	±%
Labour	A. Pettengell	1,595	49.5	−
Labour	L. Sleigh	1,397		−
Labour	J. Fairhurst	1,389		−
Conservative	P. Dyson	1,021	31.7	−
Conservative	M. Andrew	967		−
Conservative	C. Beverley	901		−
Liberal	R. Holmes	607	18.8	−
Liberal	S. Pragnall	578		−
Liberal	C. Hemmingway	498		−
Turnout			47.1	

=== St. John's ward ===
St. John's ward
Party	Candidate	Votes	%	±%
Labour	B. Mann	1,819	49.4	−
Labour	R. Deadman	1,647		−
Labour	R. Metcalfe	1,373		−
Conservative	A. Culpan	990	26.9	−
Liberal	D. Carlin	873	23.7	−
Conservative	J. Clarke	833		−
Conservative	R. Wade	818		−
Turnout			39.3	

=== Todmorden ward ===
Todmorden ward
Party	Candidate	Votes	%	±%
Labour	H. Wilson	2,071	32.8	−
Conservative	H. Tootell	2,014	31.9	−
Conservative	E. Dennett	1,925		−
Labour	A. Marshall	1,749		−
Labour	C. Parkinson	1,574		−
Conservative	F. Mills	1,525		−
Liberal	M. Holmstedt	1,415	22.4	−
Liberal	M. Taylor	1,413		−
Liberal	K. Bunn	1,144		−
Independent	R. Wild	817	12.9	−
Turnout			56.6	

=== Town ward ===
Town ward
Party	Candidate	Votes	%	±%
Labour	A. Berry	2,104	60.1	−
Labour	W. Tate	1,926		−
Labour	L. Warn	1,917		−
Conservative	G. Webb	1,398	39.9	−
Conservative	R. Farrar	1,330		−
Conservative	R. Slocombe	1,280		−
Turnout			35.9	

=== Warley ward ===
Warley ward
Party	Candidate	Votes	%	±%
Conservative	G. Smith	1,519	41.1	−
Liberal	A. Clegg	1,348	36.5	−
Conservative	B. Wildsmith	1,313		−
Liberal	J. Driver	1,160		−
Conservative	J. Ford	1,066		−
Liberal	E. Helliwell	846		−
Labour	P. Jagger	825	22.3	−
Labour	J. Thorley	783		−
Labour	M. Panko	656		−
Turnout			43.7	

== By-elections between 1973 and 1975 ==
=== Brighouse ward, 1974 ===
Brighouse By-Election 22 May 1974
Party	Candidate	Votes	%	±%
Labour	M. Cunningham	1,428	41.6	−5.2
Conservative	J. Lockwood	1,322	38.5	+7.9
Liberal	S. Williams	684	19.9	+19.9
Majority		106	3.1	
Turnout		3,434		
Labour gain from Conservative		Swing		
