= 2023 Calderdale Metropolitan Borough Council election =

2023 local election in Calderdale, England

- 4 May 2023

17 of 51 seats on Calderdale Metropolitan Borough Council 26 seats needed for a majority
- Turnout: 34.51% (▼3.0%)

	First party	Second party	Third party
Leader	Tim Swift	Steven Leigh	James Baker
Party	Labour	Conservative	Liberal Democrats
Leader's seat	Town	Ryburn	Warley
Seats before	28	15	6
Seats won	10, 58.8%	4, 23.5%	2, 11.8%
Seats after	28	15	6
Seat change	Steady	Steady	Steady
Popular vote	22,904	15,208	6,570
Percentage	44.1%	29.3%	12.6%
Swing	-1.1%	-3.4%	+0.8%
	Fourth party	Fifth party
Party	Green	Independent
Seats before	1	1
Seats won	2, 11.8%	0
Seats after	2	0
Seat change	▲1	▼1
Popular vote	6,291	288
Percentage	12.1%	0.6%
- Results by ward
Leader before election
Tim Swift
Labour
Leader after election
Tim Swift
Labour

Elections to Calderdale Metropolitan Borough Council took place on 4 May 2023 alongside other elections in the United Kingdom. Labour retained its majority on the council.

== Background ==
The Local Government Act 1972 created a two-tier system of metropolitan counties and districts covering Greater Manchester, Merseyside, South Yorkshire, Tyne and Wear, the West Midlands, and West Yorkshire starting in 1974. Calderdale was a district of the West Yorkshire metropolitan county. The Local Government Act 1985 abolished the metropolitan counties, with metropolitan districts taking on most of their powers as metropolitan boroughs. The West Yorkshire Combined Authority was established in 2014 and began electing the mayor of West Yorkshire in 2021.

Calderdale Council was under no overall control with Conservative, Liberal Democrat and Labour leaders until the Labour Party achieved a majority of seats in the 2019 election, when they gained four seats to hold 28 of the council's 51 seats. In the most recent election in 2022, seventeen seats were up for election. Labour won eleven seats, the Conservatives won 4 seats, and the Liberal Democrats and Greens both won one seat.

Positions up for election in 2023 were last elected in 2019. In that election, Labour won ten seats, the Conservatives won four, the Liberal Democrats won two and independent candidates won one seat. Labour retained its majority on the council at this election.

== Electoral process ==
The council elects its councillors in thirds, with a third being up for election for three consecutive years and no election in the fourth year. The election used first-past-the-post voting, with wards generally being represented by three councillors, with one elected in each election year to serve a four-year term.

All registered electors (British, Irish, Commonwealth and European Union citizens) living in Calderdale aged 18 or over were entitled to vote in the election. People who live at two addresses in different councils, such as university students with different term-time and holiday addresses, are entitled to be registered for and vote in elections in both local authorities. Voting in-person at polling stations took place from 07:00 to 22:00 on election day, and voters were able to apply for postal votes or proxy votes in advance of the election.

== Council results ==
Party	Councillors				Votes		
Party		Of total	Net			Of total	Net
Labour	10	58.8%	0	10 / 17	22,904	44.1%	-1.1%
Conservative	4	23.5%	0	4 / 17	15,208	29.3%	-3.4%
Liberal Democrats	2	11.8%	0	2 / 17	6,570	12.6%	+0.8%
Green	1	5.9%	+1	1 / 17	6,291	12.1%	+3.0%
Freedom Alliance	0	0.0%	0	0 / 17	366	0.7%	+0.5%
Independent	0	0.0%	-1	0 / 17	288	0.6%	+0.4%

== Council composition ==
Prior to the election the composition of the council was:

↓
28	15	6	1	1
Labour	Conservative	Lib Dem	G	I

After the election the composition of the council was:

↓
28	15	6	2
Labour	Conservative	Lib Dem	G

Party	Previous council	New council
Labour	28	28
Conservative	15	15
Liberal Democrats	6	6
Green	1	2
Independent	1	0
Total	51	51

=== Changes between 2023 and 2024 ===
- November 2023: Guy Beech (Conservative, Illingworth & Mixenden) resigned; the seat remained vacant until the May 2024 elections.
- February 2024: Rahat Khan (Labour, Park) resigned from the Labour Party and sat as an independent.

== Ward results ==
Incumbent councillors are marked with an asterisk. The results were:

=== Brighouse ===
Brighouse
Party	Candidate	Votes	%	±%
Conservative	Brenda Monteith*	1,320	43.9	−11.8
Labour	Frank Darnley	1180	39.2	+19.9
Green	Kim Atkinson	251	8.3	−0.9
Liberal Democrats	Stephen Cockroft	192	6.4	N/A
Freedom Alliance	Gabriella Paterson	57	1.9	N/A
Majority		140	4.7	
Rejected ballots		7	0.23	
Turnout		3007	36.43	
Registered electors		8,254		
Conservative hold		Swing		

=== Calder ===
Calder
Party	Candidate	Votes	%	±%
Labour Co-op	Israr Ahmed	2,615	58.8	+4.8
Green	Alan McDonald	617	13.9	−2.3
Conservative	Joseph Matthews	555	12.5	−0.9
Liberal Democrats	Diana Harris	509	11.4	−3.2
Independent	Helen Lasham	110	2.5	N/A
Majority		1998	44.9	
Rejected ballots		42	0.94	
Turnout		4448	48.31	
Registered electors		9,207		
Labour hold		Swing		

=== Elland ===
Elland
Party	Candidate	Votes	%	±%
Labour	David Veitch	1,300	47.3	+10.2
Conservative	Vanessa Lee	781	28.4	−4.3
Liberal Democrats	Richard Phillips	371	13.5	−3.0
Green	Barry Crossland	228	8.3	−3.5
Freedom Alliance	Matthew Leadbeater	60	2.2	N/A
Majority		519	18.9	
Rejected ballots		10	0.36	
Turnout		2750	31.2	
Registered electors		8,815		
Labour hold		Swing		

=== Greetland and Stainland ===
Greetland and Stainland
Party	Candidate	Votes	%	±%
Liberal Democrats	Sue Holdsworth*	1,240	42.3	−6.9
Conservative	Alex Greenwood	1077	36.7	+9.5
Labour	Adrian Horton	422	14.4	+1.7
Green	Jacquelyn Haigh	183	6.2	−2.9
Majority		163	5.6	
Rejected ballots		12	0.41	
Turnout		2934	34.7	
Registered electors		8,464		
Liberal Democrats hold		Swing		

=== Hipperholme and Lightcliffe ===
Hipperholme and Lightcliffe
Party	Candidate	Votes	%	±%
Conservative	David Kirton*	1,661	52.1	−2.1
Labour	Sam Ackroyd	1,031	32.3	+10.5
Green	Elaine Hey	353	11.1	−3.1
Liberal Democrats	Jennie Rigg	128	4.0	−3.7
Majority		630	19.8	
Rejected ballots		16	0.5	
Turnout		3189	35.1	
Registered electors		9,079		
Conservative hold		Swing		

=== Illingworth and Mixenden ===
Illingworth and Mixenden
Party	Candidate	Votes	%	±%
Labour	Steph Clarke*	1,252	54.6	+14.3
Conservative	Colonel Padgett	683	29.8	−3.6
Green	Laura Beesley	132	5.8	−1.3
Independent	Seán Loftus	118	5.1	−7.8
Liberal Democrats	Alexander Parsons-Hulse	96	4.2	−0.7
Majority		569	24.8	
Rejected ballots		13	0.57	
Turnout		2294	24.9	
Registered electors		9,202		
Labour hold		Swing		

=== Luddendenfoot ===
Luddendenfoot
Party	Candidate	Votes	%	±%
Labour	Katie Kimber	1,900	56.3	+11.5
Conservative	Jill Smith-Moorhouse	820	24.3	−2.7
Liberal Democrats	Christine Bampton-Smith	355	10.5	−5.3
Green	Kate Sweeny	271	8.0	−2.6
Majority		1080	32.0	
Rejected ballots		31	0.92	
Turnout		3377	42.2	
Registered electors		7,995		
Labour hold		Swing		

=== Northowram and Shelf ===
Northowram and Shelf
Party	Candidate	Votes	%	±%
Green	Daniel Wood	2,244	63.0	+52.7
Conservative	Stephen Baines	1004	28.2	−28.3
Labour	Khuram Majid	253	7.1	−10.6
Liberal Democrats	Philip White	54	1.5	−2.2
Majority		1240	34.8	
Rejected ballots		7	0.2	
Turnout		3562	39.2	
Registered electors		9,081		
Green gain from Independent		Swing	+13	

=== Ovenden ===
Ovenden
Party	Candidate	Votes	%	±%
Labour Co-op	Stuart Cairney*	1,029	56.9	+13.2
Conservative	Christopher Matejak	417	23.1	+3.4
Liberal Democrats	Sean Bamforth	224	12.4	−1.2
Green	Finn Jensen	126	7.0	−1.4
Majority		612	33.9	
Rejected ballots		11	0.61	
Turnout		1807	21.45	
Registered electors		8,423		
Labour hold		Swing		

=== Park ===
Park
Party	Candidate	Votes	%	±%
Labour	Rahat Khan	1,768	57.2	−29.5
Conservative	Shakir Saghir	568	18.4	+11.8
Liberal Democrats	Abdul Rehman	545	17.6	+15.4
Green	Catherine Graham	130	4.2	+0.3
Independent	Craig Withers	60	1.9	
Majority		1200	38.8	
Rejected ballots		18	0.58	
Turnout		3089	32.6	
Registered electors		9,465		
Labour hold		Swing		

=== Rastrick ===
Rastrick
Party	Candidate	Votes	%	±%
Conservative	Chris Pillai	1,289	43.8	−6.1
Labour Co-op	Alan Judge	1180	40.1	+12.2
Green	Matthew Lawson	204	6.9	−4.5
Liberal Democrats	Francesca Carr	153	5.2	−3.6
Freedom Alliance	Corinne Henderson	94	3.2	N/A
Majority		109	3.7	
Rejected ballots		23	0.78	
Turnout		2943	35.51	
Registered electors		8,288		
Conservative hold		Swing		

=== Ryburn ===
Ryburn
Party	Candidate	Votes	%	±%
Conservative	Felicity Issott*	1,463	46.0	+17.9
Labour	David Wager	1101	34.6	+23.5
Green	Freda Davis	277	8.7	+2.3
Liberal Democrats	Samuel Jackson	250	7.9	+4.0
Freedom Alliance	Michael Ogden	83	2.6	N/A
Majority		362	11.4	
Rejected ballots		6	0.19	
Turnout		3180	35.8	
Registered electors		8,878		
Conservative hold		Swing		

=== Skircoat ===
Skircoat
Party	Candidate	Votes	%	±%
Labour Co-op	Mike Barnes*	2,285	61.1	+19.1
Conservative	Peter Hunt	1049	28.1	−2.5
Liberal Democrats	Kathleen Haigh-Hutchinson	200	5.3	−0.5
Green	Mark Mullany	188	5.0	−0.6
Majority		1236	33.1	
Rejected ballots		17	0.45	
Turnout		3739	38.99	
Registered electors		9,589		
Labour hold		Swing		

=== Sowerby Bridge ===
Sowerby Bridge
Party	Candidate	Votes	%	±%
Labour	Simon Ashton	1,468	51.0	+10.3
Conservative	Mark Edwards	852	29.6	−7.6
Liberal Democrats	Thomas Stringfellow	293	10.2	+1.0
Green	David Booth	244	8.5	−2.6
Majority		616	21.4	
Rejected ballots		24	0.83	
Turnout		2881	32.89	
Registered electors		8,760		
Labour hold		Swing		

=== Todmorden ===
Todmorden
Party	Candidate	Votes	%	±%
Labour Co-op	Silvia Dacre*	1,791	57.6	+12.4
Conservative	Mark Holmes	530	17.0	+4.9
Green	Kieran Turner	472	15.2	+2.2
Liberal Democrats	Christopher Wadsworth	271	8.7	−15.1
Majority		1261	40.5	
Rejected ballots		48	1.54	
Turnout		3112	34.9	
Registered electors		8,906		
Labour hold		Swing		

=== Town ===
Town
Party	Candidate	Votes	%	±%
Labour Co-op	Tim Swift*	1,116	48.0	+4.1
Conservative	Anne-Marie Miles	796	34.2	+5.8
Green	Elliot Hey	250	10.7	+1.1
Liberal Democrats	Rosemary Tatchell	151	6.5	+1.6
Majority		320	13.8	
Rejected ballots		14	0.6	
Turnout		2327	25.9	
Registered electors		9,001		
Labour hold		Swing		

=== Warley ===
Warley
Party	Candidate	Votes	%	±%
Liberal Democrats	Abigail Carr	1,538	46.6	−6.4
Labour	Ash Ashfaq	1213	36.8	+5.8
Conservative	Vishal Gupta	343	10.4	−0.4
Green	Katie Witham	121	3.7	−0.3
Freedom Alliance	Martin Davies	72	2.2	N/A
Majority		325	9.9	
Rejected ballots		12	0.36	
Turnout		3299	36.2	
Registered electors		9,105		
Liberal Democrats hold		Swing		
