= 2021 Calderdale Metropolitan Borough Council election =

2021 UK local government election

Calderdale Metropolitan Borough Council Elections, 2021
- 6 May 2021

One third to Calderdale Metropolitan Borough Council plus 2 midterm vacancies, 19 out of 51 seats 26 seats needed for a majority
- Turnout: 44.3% (▲7.5%)
	First party	Second party	Third party
Leader	Steven Leigh	Tim Swift	James Baker
Party	Conservative	Labour	Liberal Democrats
Leader's seat	Ryburn	Town	Warley
Seats won	9, 47.4%	8, 42.1%	2, 10.5%
Seat change	▲3	Steady	▼2
Popular vote	25,940	24,775	7,511
Percentage	39.0%	37.3%	11.3%
Swing	▲9.0%	Steady	▼3.5%
Council control before election
Majority administration
Labour
Council control after election
Majority administration
Labour

2021 local election results in Calderdale

The 2021 Calderdale Metropolitan Borough Council election took place on 6 May 2021 to elect members of Calderdale Metropolitan Borough Council in England. This was on the same day as other local elections. One-third of the seats were up for election.

The election was originally scheduled for 7 May 2020, alongside the later cancelled 2020 West Yorkshire Police and Crime Commissioner election and other local elections across the UK, but was delayed for a year due to the COVID-19 pandemic.

== Council results ==
2021 Calderdale Metropolitan Borough Council election
Party	This election				Full council			This election		
Party	Candidates	Seats	Net	Seats %	Other	Total	Total %	Votes	Votes %	+/−
Labour	{{{candidates}}}	8	Steady	42.1	20	28	54.9	24,775	37.3	±0.0
Conservative	{{{candidates}}}	9	▲3	47.4	6	15	29.4	25,940	39.0	+9.0
Liberal Democrats	{{{candidates}}}	2	▼2	10.5	3	5	9.8	7,511	11.3	-2.9
Independent	{{{candidates}}}	0	▼1	0.0	3	3	5.9	2,163	3.3	-2.1
Green	{{{candidates}}}	0	Steady	0.0	0	0	0.0	5,525	8.3	-1.1
Yorkshire	{{{candidates}}}	0	Steady	0.0	0	0	0.0	325	0.5	-1.1
Freedom Alliance	{{{candidates}}}	0	Steady	0.0	0	0	0.0	90	0.1	New
National Front	{{{candidates}}}	0	Steady	0.0	0	0	0.0	86	0.1	-0.2
Reform	{{{candidates}}}	0	Steady	0.0	0	0	0.0	51	0.1	New
SDP	{{{candidates}}}	0	Steady	0.0	0	0	0.0	15	<0.1	New

Note that due to by-elections being run in some wards, electors in those wards had two votes. This means the change in percentage of votes is not representative of the true swing.

== Council Composition ==
Prior to the election the composition of the council was:

↓
28	12	7	4
Labour	Conservative	Lib Dem	Ind

After the election the composition of the council was:

↓
28	15	5	3
Labour	Conservative	Lib Dem	Ind

Party	Previous council	New council
Labour	28	28
Conservative	12	15
Liberal Democrats	7	5
Independent	4	3
Total	51	51

== Ward results ==
=== Brighouse ===
Brighouse
Party	Candidate	Votes	%	±%
Conservative	Tina Benton	1,643	51.7	+10.2
Conservative	Brenda Monteith	1,431	45.0	+3.6
Independent	Colin Stout	977	30.7	N/A
Labour	Charlotte Butterick	900	28.3	−5.3
Labour	Oliver Willows	660	20.8	−12.8
Green	Kim Atkinson	318	10.0	+7.1
Green	Joanne Core	250	7.9	+5.0
Liberal Democrats	Michael Sutton	112	3.5	−0.7
Independent	Colin Peel	50	1.6	N/A
Majority		531	16.7	+8.8
Turnout		3178.5	45.3	+7.7
Conservative hold		Swing		
Conservative hold		Swing		

The incumbent Scott Benton for the Conservative Party, who stood down at this election upon his election as a Member of Parliament in 2019.

Colin Peel, initially elected for the Conservative Party but defected to Change UK in the summer of 2019, but sought re-election as an independent.

=== Calder ===
Calder
Party	Candidate	Votes	%	±%
Labour	Josh Fenton-Glynn	3,399	66.0	+16.2
Conservative	Gail Lund	936	18.2	+8.7
Green	Alan McDonald	480	9.3	−0.3
Liberal Democrats	Nikki Stocks	220	4.3	−26.5
Freedom Alliance	Helen Lasham	90	1.7	N/A
Majority		2,463	47.8	+28.7
Turnout		5148	55.4	+4.8
Labour hold		Swing	3.71	

The incumbent was Josh Fenton-Glynn for the Labour Party. The swing is expressed between Labour and Conservative. The swing was 21.31% from Liberal Democrat who were second in 2016 to Labour.

=== Elland ===
Elland
Party	Candidate	Votes	%	±%
Conservative	John Ford	1,209	36.7	+14.7
Labour	Jim Gallagher	1,147	34.8	+17.0
Liberal Democrats	Pat Allen	699	21.2	−22.2
Green	Barry Crossland	220	6.7	+3.7
Majority		62	1.9	−19.5
Turnout		3,296	37.89	+1.4
Conservative gain from Liberal Democrats		Swing	18.45	

The incumbent was Pat Allen for the Liberal Democrats.

=== Greetland and Stainland ===
Greetland and Stainland
Party	Candidate	Votes	%	±%
Liberal Democrats	Paul Bellenger	1,814	58.8	+20.4
Conservative	Jacob Cook	1,020	33.1	+1.1
Liberal Democrats	Alex Parsons-Hulse	997	32.3	−6.1
Conservative	Joseph Matthews	954	30.9	−1.1
Labour	Kathleen Foster	435	14.1	+1.8
Green	Jacquelyn Haigh	296	9.6	+5.8
Independent	Ed Greenwood	240	7.8	N/A
Labour	Rahat Khan	234	7.6	−4.8
Green	Matt Lawson	154	5.0	+1.2
Majority		23	0.7	−5.7
Turnout		3083	42.4	+5.2
Liberal Democrats hold		Swing		
Conservative gain from Liberal Democrats		Swing		

The incumbents were Marilyn Greenwood for the Liberal Democrats who died in February 2021, and Paul Bellenger for the Liberal Democrats.

=== Hipperholme and Lightcliffe ===
Hipperholme and Lightcliffe
Party	Candidate	Votes	%	±%
Conservative	George Robinson	2,679	67.5	+3.3
Labour	Joe Thompson	910	22.9	+6.0
Green	Elaine Hey	265	6.7	−1.3
Liberal Democrats	Sophie Sutton	92	2.3	−7.9
Majority		1,769	44.6	−2.7
Turnout		3,968	43.8	+8.4
Conservative hold		Swing	-1.37	

The incumbent was George Robinson for the Conservative Party.

=== Illingworth and Mixenden ===
Illingworth and Mixenden
Party	Candidate	Votes	%	±%
Conservative	Guy Beech	1,226	42.4	+17.7
Labour	Stuart Cairney	1,133	39.2	−9.3
Yorkshire	Paul Farrell	325	11.2	N/A
Green	Mark Mullany	90	3.1	+1.0
Independent	Sean Loftus	48	1.7	−0.1
Liberal Democrats	Mark Pittaway	46	1.6	0.0
SDP	Martin Roberts	15	0.5	N/A
Majority		93	3.22	−20.5
Turnout		2,889	31.9	+0.9
Conservative gain from Labour		Swing	13.5	

The incumbent was Lisa Lambert for the Labour Party who stood down at this election. There was a swing of 19.2% from UKIP, who did not stand this time, to the Conservatives.

=== Luddendenfoot ===
Luddendenfoot
Party	Candidate	Votes	%	±%
Labour	Jane Scullion	1,735	45.6	+5.5
Conservative	Jill Smith-Moorhouse	1,365	35.8	+10.4
Liberal Democrats	Christine Bampton-Smith	372	9.8	−8.0
Green	Kate Sweeny	313	8.2	+4.4
Majority		370	9.7	−4.9
Turnout		3,808	47.6	+4.9
Labour hold		Swing	-2.5	

The incumbent was Jane Scullion for the Labour Party.

=== Northowram and Shelf ===
Northowram and Shelf
Party	Candidate	Votes	%	±%
Conservative	Peter Caffrey	2,193	58.1	−2.4
Green	Martin Hey	902	23.9	+19.1
Labour	Frank Darnley	596	15.8	−9.8
Liberal Democrats	Catherine Crosland	75	2.0	−0.6
Majority		1,291	34.2	−1.5
Turnout		3,777	41.4	+5.8
Conservative hold		Swing	3.3	

The incumbent was Peter Caffrey for the Conservative Party. The swing is expressed between Conservative & Labour who were second in 2016. It was 10.7% from Conservative to Green.

=== Ovenden ===
Ovenden
Party	Candidate	Votes	%	±%
Labour	Danielle Durrans	979	45.2	−14.5
Conservative	Andrew Tagg	811	37.4	+14.8
Liberal Democrats	Sean Bamforth	245	11.3	+6.5
Green	Finn Jensen	114	5.3	−6.5
Majority		168	7.8	−29.3
Turnout		2,166	25.6	+2.6
Labour hold		Swing	-14.7	

The incumbent was Anne Collins for the Labour Party who stood down at this election.

=== Park ===
Park
Party	Candidate	Votes	%	±%
Labour	Jenny Lynn	2,375	60.6	−10.1
Conservative	Shakir Saghir	1,297	33.1	+26.6
Green	Laura Beesley	124	3.2	+0.5
Liberal Democrats	Ruth Coleman-Taylor	100	2.6	0.0
Majority		1,078	27.5	−26.7
Turnout		3,919	41.4	−1.9
Labour hold		Swing	-18.3	

The incumbent was Jenny Lynn for the Labour Party.

=== Rastrick ===
Rastrick
Party	Candidate	Votes	%	±%
Conservative	Sophie Whittaker	2,112	58.2	+10.1
Labour	Peter Judge	1,082	29.8	−8.5
Green	Gareth Owen	327	9.0	+3.3
Liberal Democrats	Javed Bashir	91	2.5	−4.4
Majority		1,030	28.4	+18.6
Turnout		3,627	43.4	+6.3
Conservative hold		Swing	9.3	

The incumbent was Sophie Whittaker for the Conservative Party.

=== Ryburn ===
Ryburn
Party	Candidate	Votes	%	±%
Conservative	Robert Thornber	1,785	47.1	+11.7
Independent	Peter Hunt	848	22.4	−10.3
Labour	Leah Webster	798	21.0	−2.0
Green	Freda Davis	207	5.5	+0.6
Liberal Democrats	Pete Wilcock	85	2.5	−1.2
Reform	Chris Green	51	1.3	N/A
Majority		937	24.7	+22.0
Turnout		3,783	42.2	+1.4
Conservative hold		Swing	11.0	

The incumbent was Geraldine Carter for the Conservative Party who stood down at this election. Robert Thornber had previously held one of the other seats in this ward but lost to an independent candidate in 2019.

=== Skircoat ===
Skircoat
Party	Candidate	Votes	%	±%
Labour	Janet Kingstone	2,143	49.3	+19.8
Conservative	Mohammad Ilyas	1,524	35.1	−8.9
Green	Mary Betteridge	378	8.7	+5.1
Liberal Democrats	Kathleen Haigh-Hutchinson	268	6.2	−7.3
Majority		619	14.2	−0.2
Turnout		4,346	45.2	+4.9
Labour gain from Conservative		Swing	+14.4	

The incumbent was John Hardy for the Conservative Party who stood down at this election.

=== Sowerby Bridge ===
Sowerby Bridge
Party	Candidate	Votes	%	±%
Labour	Adam Wilkinson	1,805	52.3	+2.8
Conservative	Mark Edwards	1,272	36.8	+8.9
Green	David Booth	238	6.9	+2.9
Liberal Democrats	Thomas Stringfellow	109	3.2	−1.8
Majority		533	15.4	−6.0
Turnout		3,453	39.5	+1.1
Labour hold		Swing	-3.0	

The incumbent was Adam Wilkinson for the Labour Party.

=== Todmorden ===
Todmorden
Party	Candidate	Votes	%	±%
Labour	Diana Tremayne	1,951	51.5	+5.7
Conservative	Craig Oates	824	21.7	−0.1
Liberal Democrats	Matthew Doyle	552	14.6	+3.5
Green	Kieran Turner	361	9.5	−0.1
National Front	Chris Jackson	86	2.3	0.0
Majority		1,127	29.7	+5.8
Turnout		3,791	41.6	+2.6
Labour hold		Swing	-2.9	

The incumbent was Steve Sweeney for the Labour Party who stood down at this election.

=== Town ===
Town
Party	Candidate	Votes	%	±%
Labour	Megan Swift	1,385	49.7	+1.9
Conservative	Naveed Khan	916	32.9	+11.6
Green	Elliot Hey	316	11.4	+7.0
Liberal Democrats	Mick Taylor	141	5.1	+2.2
Majority		469	16.8	−7.7
Turnout		2,784	30.9	−0.1
Labour hold		Swing	-4.9	

The incumbent was Megan Swift for the Labour Party.

=== Warley ===
Warley
Party	Candidate	Votes	%	±%
Liberal Democrats	Ashley Evans	1,493	42.2	−4.7
Labour	David Veitch	1,108	31.3	−4.2
Conservative	David Budgen	743	21.0	+7.4
Green	Katie Witham	172	4.9	+1.8
Majority		385	10.9	−0.5
Turnout		3,535	39.0	−4.1
Liberal Democrats hold		Swing	-0.3	

The incumbent was Ashley Evans for the Liberal Democrats.

== By-elections between 2021 and 2022 ==
=== Park ward, 2021 ===
Park By-Election 2 September 2021
Party	Candidate	Votes	%	±%
Labour	Mohammed Shazad Fazal	1,980	82.4	
Conservative	Naveed Khan	212	8.8	
Green	Jacquelyn Haigh	137	5.7	
Liberal Democrats	Javed Bashir	60	2.5	
Majority		1,768	73.6	
Turnout		2,402	25.3	
Labour hold		Swing		

The incumbent was Mohammad Naeem for Labour who had died in July.

=== Ryburn ward, 2021 ===
Ryburn By-Election 2 September 2021
Party	Candidate	Votes	%	±%
Conservative	Felicity Thea Issott	1,188	53.5	
Labour	Leah Webster	798	35.9	
Green	Freda Mary Davis	163	7.3	
Liberal Democrats	Pete Wilcock	66	3.0	
Majority		390	17.6	
Turnout		2,220	24.9	
Conservative gain from Independent		Swing		

The incumbent was Rob Holden, an independent, who had resigned for health reasons.
