= 2022 Calderdale Metropolitan Borough Council election =

2022 local election in Calderdale

Calderdale Metropolitan Borough Council Elections, 2022
- 5 May 2022

One third of Calderdale Metropolitan Borough Council plus 1 midterm vacancy, 18 out of 51 seats 26 seats needed for a majority
- Turnout: 37.5% (▼6.8%)
	First party	Second party	Third party
Leader	Tim Swift	Steven Leigh	James Baker
Party	Labour	Conservative	Liberal Democrats
Leader's seat	Town	Ryburn	Warley
Seats won	11, 61.1%	4, 22.2%	2, 12.6%
Seat change	Steady	▼1	▲1
Popular vote	25,528	18,499	6,662
Percentage	45.2%	32.7%	11.8%
Swing	+7.9%	-6.3%	+0.5%
- Results by ward
Council control before election
Majority administration
Labour
Council control after election
Majority administration
Labour

The 2022 Calderdale Metropolitan Borough Council election took place on 5 May 2022 to elect members of Calderdale Metropolitan Borough Council in England. One third of councillors — 17 out of 51, plus one vacancy in Ovenden ward were up for election. The election took place alongside other local elections across the United Kingdom.

In the previous council election in 2021, Labour maintained its control of the council, holding 28 seats after the election. The Conservatives won more of the seats that were up for election, but remained the main opposition with 16 seats. The remaining seats were held by the Liberal Democrats and independent councillors.

== Background ==
Result of the council election when these seats were last contested in 2018

Result of the most recent council election in 2021

The Local Government Act 1972 created a two-tier system of metropolitan counties and districts covering Greater Manchester, Merseyside, South Yorkshire, Tyne and Wear, the West Midlands, and West Yorkshire starting in 1974. Calderdale was a district of the West Yorkshire metropolitan county. The Local Government Act 1985 abolished the metropolitan counties, with metropolitan districts taking on most of their powers as metropolitan boroughs. The West Yorkshire Combined Authority was established in 2014 and began electing the mayor of West Yorkshire in 2021.

Calderdale Council was under no overall control with Conservative, Liberal Democrat and Labour leaders until the Labour Party achieved a majority of seats in the 2019 election, when they gained four seats to hold 28 of the council's 51 seats. In the most recent election in 2021, nineteen seats were up for election: 17 as part of the normal thirds cycle and two concurrent by-elections to fill vacant seats. The Conservatives made gains at the expense of the Liberal Democrats and independents to come first in seats and share of the vote, winning nine of the nineteen seats up for election on 39.0% of the vote, while Labour won eight with 37.3% of the vote and the Liberal Democrats won the remaining two seats with 11.3% of the vote. The Green Party received 8.3% of the vote but won no seats. Labour maintained its majority on the council.

A Labour councillor for the Park ward, Mohammad Naeem, died in July 2021. Around the same time, the independent councillor for Ryburn, Rob Holden, resigned. By-elections to fill both vacancies were held in September 2021, with the Labour candidate Shazad Fazal holding Park and the Conservative candidate Felicity Issott gaining Ryburn. The former Conservative councillor Roger Taylor, who had been suspended from his party in 2019 for making Islamophobic social media posts, was later permanently suspended from his party.

Positions up for election in 2022 were last elected in 2018. In that election, Labour won ten seats, the Conservatives won four, the Liberal Democrats won two and independent candidates won one seat.

== Electoral process ==
The council elects its councillors in thirds, with a third being up for election for three consecutive years and no election in the fourth year. The election will take place by first-past-the-post voting, with wards generally being represented by three councillors, with one elected in each election year to serve a four-year term.

All registered electors (British, Irish, Commonwealth and European Union citizens) living in Calderdale aged 18 or over will be entitled to vote in the election. People who live at two addresses in different councils, such as university students with different term-time and holiday addresses, are entitled to be registered for and vote in elections in both local authorities. Voting in-person at polling stations will take place from 07:00 to 22:00 on election day, and voters will be able to apply for postal votes or proxy votes in advance of the election.

== Campaign ==
The Conservative group leader, Steven Leigh, said he was aiming to gain seats with the purpose of replacing the Labour council after the 2023 election.

== Council results ==
Party	Councillors				Votes		
Party		Of total	Net			Of total	Net
Labour	11	61.1%	0	11 / 18	25,528	45.2%	+7.9%
Conservative	4	22.2%	-1	4 / 18	18,499	32.7%	-6.3%
Liberal Democrats	2	11.1%	+1	2 / 18	6,662	11.8%	+0.5%
Green	1	5.6%	+1	1 / 18	5,129	9.1%	+0.8%
Independent	0	0.0%	-1	0 / 18	198	0.4%	-3.2%
Freedom Alliance	0	0.0%	0	0 / 18	116	0.2%	+0.1%
National Front	0	0.0%	0	0 / 18	101	0.2%	+0.1%

Note that due to by-elections being run in some wards, electors in those wards had two votes. This means the change in percentage of votes is not representative of the true swing.

== Council composition ==
Prior to the election the composition of the council was:

↓
28	16	5	2
Labour	Conservative	Lib Dem	Ind

After the election the composition of the council was:

↓
28	15	6	1	1
Labour	Conservative	Lib Dem	G	I

Party	Previous council	New council
Labour	28	28
Conservative	16	15
Liberal Democrats	5	6
Green	0	1
Independent	2	1
Total	51	51

== Ward results ==
=== Brighouse ===
Brighouse
Party	Candidate	Votes	%	±%
Conservative	Howard Blagbrough	1,642	52.9	−5.3
Labour	Frank Darnley	977	31.5	−3.4
Liberal Democrats	Michael Sutton	284	9.1	5.4
Green	Adrian Thompson	192	6.2	3.2
Majority		665	21.4	−1.9
Turnout		3,106	37.5	−5.3
Conservative hold		Swing	-0.9	

The incumbent was Howard Blagbrough for the Conservative Party.

=== Calder ===
Calder
Party	Candidate	Votes	%	±%
Labour	Sarah Courtney	3,046	65.1	3.1
Conservative	Jill Smith-Moorhouse	745	15.9	−4.5
Green	Alan McDonald	465	9.9	1.9
Liberal Democrats	Christine Bampton-Smith	339	7.2	−2.0
Freedom Alliance	Helen Lasham	57	1.2	1.2
Majority		2,301	49.2	7.7
Turnout		4,680	51.1	−2.7
Labour hold		Swing	3.8	

The incumbent was Sarah Courtney for the Labour Party.

=== Elland ===
Elland
Party	Candidate	Votes	%	±%
Labour	Angie Gallagher	1,449	50.3	6.7
Conservative	Joseph Matthews	952	33.0	−9.6
Liberal Democrats	Javed Bashir	236	8.2	−0.6
Green	Barry Crossland	234	8.1	3.2
Majority		497	17.3	16.2
Turnout		2,881	33.0	−6.7
Labour hold		Swing	8.1	

The incumbent was Angie Gallagher for the Labour Party.

=== Greetland and Stainland ===
Greetland and Stainland
Party	Candidate	Votes	%	±%
Liberal Democrats	Christine Prashad	1,565	48.2	−1.6
Conservative	Jacob Cook	1,164	35.9	3.8
Labour	Rahat Khan	315	9.7	−4.9
Green	Jacquelyn Haigh	185	5.7	2.4
Majority		401	12.4	−5.4
Turnout		3,244	38.4	−1.7
Liberal Democrats gain from Conservative		Swing	-2.7	

The incumbent was Jacob Cook for the Conservative Party. The percentage change is expressed compared to the 2018 election when the late Marilyn Greenwood was elected for the Liberal Democrats. Jacob Cook was elected as the second councillor in 2021.

=== Hipperholme and Lightcliffe ===
Hipperholme and Lightcliffe
Party	Candidate	Votes	%	±%
Conservative	Joe Atkinson	1,828	54.9	19.4
Labour Co-op	Israr Ahmed	751	22.5	5.8
Green	Elaine Hey	449	13.5	10.4
Liberal Democrats	Jennie Rigg	289	8.7	5.7
Majority		1,077	32.3	26.3
Turnout		3,332	36.8	−2.9
Conservative gain from Independent		Swing	30.5	

The incumbent was Colin Raistrick, an independent, who stepped down at this election. The swing between Conservative & Labour is 6.8% to Conservative.

=== Illingworth and Mixenden ===
Illingworth and Mixenden
Party	Candidate	Votes	%	±%
Labour	Daniel Sutherland	1,208	48.0	−4.0
Conservative	Nikki Kelly	1,019	40.5	3.1
Green	Laura Beesley	112	4.4	0.1
Independent	Seán Loftus	105	4.2	0.3
Liberal Democrats	Alexander Parsons-Hulse	64	2.5	0.1
Majority		189	7.5	−7.1
Turnout		2,519	27.7	−2.3
Labour hold		Swing	-3.6	

The incumbent was Dan Sutherland for the Labour Party.

=== Luddendenfoot ===
Luddendenfoot
Party	Candidate	Votes	%	±%
Labour	Scott Patient	2,238	61.4	10.3
Conservative	Craig Oates	947	26.0	−10.8
Liberal Democrats	Abbie Carr	223	6.1	−1.8
Green	Kate Sweeny	212	5.8	2.0
Majority		1,291	35.4	21.1
Turnout		3,645	45.7	−2.8
Labour hold		Swing	10.6	

The incumbent was Scott Patient for the Labour Party.

=== Northowram and Shelf ===
Northowram and Shelf
Party	Candidate	Votes	%	±%
Green	Martin Hey	1,364	40.0	35.5
Conservative	Stephen Baines	1,357	39.7	−23.4
Labour	David Wager	609	17.8	−6.2
Liberal Democrats	Catherine Crosland	73	2.1	−0.7
Majority		7	0.2	−38.9
Turnout		3,414	37.6	0.6
Green gain from Conservative		Swing	29.4	

The incumbent was Stephen Baines for the Conservative Party who was the deputy leader of the Conservative group at the time of the election.

This was the only ward to increase its turnout compared to 2018.

=== Ovenden ===
Ovenden
Party	Candidate	Votes	%	±%
Labour	Helen Rivron	997	53.3	−1.5
Labour Co-op	Stuart Cairney	881	47.1	−7.7
Conservative	Andrew Tagg	562	30.1	−0.6
Conservative	Peter Hunt	476	25.5	−5.2
Liberal Democrats	Jean Bellenger	197	10.5	+6.4
Green	Catherine Graham	159	8.5	−1.7
Green	Finn Jensen	116	6.2	−4.0
Majority				
Turnout		1,870		
Labour hold		Swing		
Labour hold		Swing		

The incumbents were Helen Rivron for the Labour Party and Bryan Smith for the Labour Party who was standing down for health reasons.

=== Park ===
Park
Party	Candidate	Votes	%	±%
Labour	Mohammed Fazal	2,430	64.5	8.0
Liberal Democrats	Abdul Rehman	601	16.0	16.0
Conservative	Shakir Saghir	565	15.0	10.1
Green	Mark Mullany	159	4.2	1.3
Majority		1,829	48.6	27.2
Turnout		3,765	39.3	−14.0
Labour hold		Swing	4.0	

The incumbent was Mohammed Fazal for the Labour Party. The second place candidate in 2018 was Surraya Bibi standing as an independent, having previously been part of the Labour party. The swing from Independent to Labour was 21.6%.

=== Rastrick ===
Rastrick
Party	Candidate	Votes	%	±%
Conservative	Regan Dickenson	1,520	49.4	−7.2
Labour Co-op	Peter Judge	1,202	39.1	3.8
Green	Matthew Lawson	185	6.0	2.4
Liberal Democrats	Richard Phillips	150	4.9	0.4
Majority		318	10.3	−10.9
Turnout		3,078	37.5	−4.2
Conservative hold		Swing	-5.5	

The incumbent was Regan Dickenson for the Conservative Party.

=== Ryburn ===
Ryburn
Party	Candidate	Votes	%	±%
Conservative	Steven Leigh	1,544	47.0	8.8
Labour	Leah Webster	1,307	39.8	18.6
Green	Freda Davis	253	7.7	5.1
Liberal Democrats	Peter Wilcock	167	5.1	1.6
Majority		237	7.2	3.3
Turnout		3,285	36.9	−6.5
Conservative hold		Swing	-4.9	

The incumbent was Steven Leigh for the Conservative Party.

Second place in 2018 was Robert Holden standing as an independent. The swing in the box is expressed between Conservative & Labour. The swing from Independent to Conservative was 21.5%.

=== Skircoat ===
Skircoat
Party	Candidate	Votes	%	±%
Labour	Colin Hutchinson	2,227	56.3	9.6
Conservative	John Holdsworth	1,270	32.1	−13.4
Liberal Democrats	Kathy Haigh-Hutchinson	235	5.9	1.4
Green	Philip Whitbread	209	5.3	2.3
Majority		957	24.2	23.0
Turnout		3,953	41.1	−4.2
Labour hold		Swing	11.5	

The incumbent was Colin Hutchinson for the Labour Party.

=== Sowerby Bridge ===
Sowerby Bridge
Party	Candidate	Votes	%	±%
Labour	Dot Foster	1,551	51.1	0.6
Conservative	Mark Edwards	996	32.8	−6.0
Liberal Democrats	Tom Stringfellow	258	8.5	2.8
Green	David Booth	214	7.0	2.4
Majority		555	18.3	6.6
Turnout		3,038	34.7	3.1
Labour hold		Swing	3.3	

The incumbent was Dot Foster for the Labour Party.

=== Todmorden ===
Todmorden
Party	Candidate	Votes	%	±%
Labour Co-op	Helen Brundell	1,982	59.2	5.1
Conservative	Naveed Khan	569	17.0	−2.3
Green	Kieran Turner	347	10.4	4.0
Liberal Democrats	Nikki Stocks	309	9.2	−8.0
National Front	Chris Jackson	101	3.0	0.3
Majority		1,413	42.2	7.4
Turnout		3,347	37.1	−3.4
Labour hold		Swing	3.7	

The incumbent was Susan Press for the Labour Party who stood down at this election.

=== Town ===
Town
Party	Candidate	Votes	%	±%
Labour	Joe Thompson	1,198	47.9	−5.5
Conservative	Penny Hutchinson	988	39.5	2.2
Green	Elliot Hey	178	7.1	2.2
Liberal Democrats	Rosemary Tatchell	130	5.2	1.3
Majority		210	8.4	−7.8
Turnout		2,502	27.8	−2.0
Labour hold		Swing	-3.9	

The incumbent was Bob Metcalfe for the Labour Party who stood down at this election.

=== Warley ===
Warley
Party	Candidate	Votes	%	±%
Liberal Democrats	Amanda Parsons-Hulse	1,542	46.5	0.4
Labour	David Veitch	1,160	35.0	−1.1
Conservative	Vishal Gupta	355	10.7	−5.3
Green	Katie Witham	96	2.9	1.5
Independent	Dave Budge	93	2.8	2.8
Freedom Alliance	Martin Davies	59	1.8	1.8
Majority		382	11.5	1.5
Turnout		3,317	36.3	−8.4
Liberal Democrats hold		Swing	0.7	

The incumbent was Amanda Parsons-Hulse for the Liberal Democrats.
