= Skircoat (UK electoral ward) =

- 2004 Boundaries of Skircoat Ward
- Population: 12,712 (2011 census)
- Metropolitan borough: Calderdale
- Metropolitan county: West Yorkshire
- Region: Yorkshire and the Humber
- Country: England
- Sovereign state: United Kingdom
- Police: West Yorkshire
- Fire: West Yorkshire
- Ambulance: Yorkshire
- UK Parliament: Halifax

Skircoat is an electoral ward in Calderdale, West Yorkshire, England, and returns three members to sit on Calderdale Metropolitan Borough Council. The population at the 2011 Census was 12,712. It covers the area of Skircoat Green.

== Election results ==
=== Returned Councillors ===
Election	2004	2006	2007	2008	2009	2010	2011	2012	2014	2015	2016	2018	2019
Councillor, party	Geoffrey Wainwright, Conservative				John Hardy, Conservative								
Councillor, party	John Ford, Conservative		Stephen Gow, Liberal Democrats				Marcus Thompson, Conservative						Mike Barnes, Labour
Councillor, party	Grenville Horsfall, Conservative					Pauline Nash, Liberal Democrats			Andrew Tagg, Conservative			Colin Hutchinson, Labour	

The percentage changes are calculated in comparison to the party performances in the previous election.

=== 2019 Election ===
The incumbent was Marcus Thompson for the Conservative Party who stood down at this election.

Skircoat Ward 2019
Party	Candidate	Votes	%	±%
Labour Co-op	Mike Barnes	1,725	42.0	−4.8
Conservative	Jeff Featherstone	1257	30.6	−14.9
Independent	John Joseph Wainwright	625	15.2	+15.2
Liberal Democrats	Alexander Nigel Sutcliffe	239	5.8	+1.3
Green	Finn Mygind Jensen	231	5.6	+2.7
Majority		468	11.4	+10.1
Turnout		4,103	42.7	−2.5
Labour gain from Conservative		Swing		

=== 2018 Election ===
The incumbent was Andrew Tagg for the Conservative Party.

Skircoat Ward 2018
Party	Candidate	Votes	%	±%
Labour	Colin Hugh Hutchinson	2,017	46.8	+17.3
Conservative	Andrew James Tagg	1,963	45.5	+1.5
Liberal Democrats	Sean William Bamforth	196	4.5	−8.9
Green	Anne Marie Nelson	127	2.9	−0.7
Majority		54	1.3	−13.2
Turnout		4,312	45.2	+4.8
Labour gain from Conservative		Swing		

=== 2016 Election ===
The incumbent was John Hardy for the Conservative Party.

Skircoat Ward 2016
Party	Candidate	Votes	%	±%
Conservative	John Cecil David Hardy	1,660	44.0	−3.8
Labour	Dave Draycott	1,113	29.5	+3.4
Liberal Democrats	Stephen Alexander Gow	507	13.4	+4.1
UKIP	Geoffrey Thompson	293	7.8	+7.8
Green	Eric Dolphy Fabrizi	136	3.6	−5.7
Yorkshire First	Darren Stansfield	56	1.5	+1.5
Majority		547	14.5	−7.2
Turnout		3,775	40.4	−29.3
Conservative hold		Swing		

=== 2015 Election ===
The incumbent was Marcus Thompson for the Conservative Party.

Skircoat Ward 2015
Party	Candidate	Votes	%	±%
Conservative	Marcus Joseph Thompson	3,185	47.8	+13.7
Labour	Mohammad Naeem	1,740	26.1	+4.8
Liberal Democrats	Stephen Alexander Gow	1,033	15.5	−3.5
Green	Gary Michael Scott	622	9.3	−1.1
Majority		1,445	21.7	+8.8
Turnout		6,658	69.7	+31.1
Conservative hold		Swing		

=== 2014 Election ===
The incumbent was Pauline Nash for the Liberal Democrats.

Skircoat Ward 2014
Party	Candidate	Votes	%	±%
Conservative	Andrew Tagg	1,252	34.1	−6.9
Labour	Alistair John Millington	780	21.3	0.0
Liberal Democrats	Margaret Pauline Elizabeth Nash	696	19.0	−11.3
UKIP	Grenville Horsfall	628	17.1	+17.1
Green	Gary Michael Scott	300	8.2	+1.3
Majority		472	12.9	+2.2
Turnout		3,668	38.6	+0.2
Conservative gain from Liberal Democrats		Swing		

=== 2012 Election ===
The incumbent was John Hardy for the Conservative Party.

Skircoat Ward 2012
Party	Candidate	Votes	%	±%
Conservative	John Cecil David Hardy	1,496	41.0	+4.5
Liberal Democrats	Stephen Gow	1,104	30.3	−2.0
Labour	Alistair John Millington	778	21.3	−1.6
Green	Charles Gate	251	6.9	−0.9
Majority		392	10.7	+6.5
Turnout		3,647	38.4	−7.5
Conservative hold		Swing		

=== 2011 Election ===
The incumbent was Stephen Gow for the Liberal Democrats.

Skircoat Ward 2011
Party	Candidate	Votes	%	±%
Conservative	Marcus Joseph Chance Thompson	1,584	36.5	+1.1
Liberal Democrats	Stephen Gow	1,401	32.3	−9.3
Labour Co-op	Anne Collins	993	22.9	+5.9
Green	Charles Gate	339	7.8	+2.9
Majority		183	4.2	−2.1
Turnout		4,335	45.9	−22.7
Conservative gain from Liberal Democrats		Swing		

=== 2010 Election ===
The incumbent was Grenville Horsfall for the Conservative Party.

Skircoat Ward 2010
Party	Candidate	Votes	%	±%
Liberal Democrats	Pauline Nash	2,748	41.6	+8.1
Conservative	Sheila Ruth Helen Jackson	2,334	35.4	−1.4
Labour Co-op	Anne Collins	1,124	17.0	+9.4
Green	Charles Gate	324	4.9	+2.3
Majority		414	6.3	+3.0
Turnout		6,602	68.6	+30.5
Liberal Democrats gain from Conservative		Swing		

=== 2009 By-Election ===
The incumbent was Geoffrey Wainwright for the Conservative Party. The by-election was triggered by his sudden death.

Skircoat Ward 2009
Party	Candidate	Votes	%	±%
Conservative	John Cecil David Hardy	1,327	36.8	−17.2
Liberal Democrats	Pauline Nash	1,209	33.5	+0.4
Labour	Anne Collins	274	7.6	−0.2
Independent	Paul Brannigan	238	6.6	+6.6
BNP	Chris Godridge	235	6.5	+6.5
Independent	Philip Maxwell Crossley	229	6.4	+6.4
Green	Viv Smith	92	2.6	−2.5
Majority		118	3.3	−17.7
Turnout		3,608	38.1	−4.1
Conservative hold		Swing		

=== 2008 Election ===
The incumbent was Geoffrey Wainwright for the Conservative Party.

Skircoat Ward 2008
Party	Candidate	Votes	%	±%
Conservative	Geoffrey Wainwright	2,132	54.0	+21.0
Liberal Democrats	Pauline Nash	1,305	33.1	−10.4
Labour Co-op	Marion Simone Batten	308	7.8	−3.6
Green	Viv Smith	202	5.1	+1.1
Majority		827	21.0	+10.5
Turnout		3,947	42.2	−0.4
Conservative hold		Swing		

=== 2007 Election ===
The incumbent was John Ford for the Conservative Party.

Skircoat Ward 2007
Party	Candidate	Votes	%	±%
Liberal Democrats	Stephen Alexander Gow	1,716	43.5	+3.2
Conservative	John Frank Brearley Ford	1,301	33.0	−7.5
Labour	Anne Collins	449	11.4	+2.0
BNP	Anthony Shane Bentley	317	8.0	+8.0
Green	Simon Christopher Turner	159	4.0	−5.4
Majority		415	10.5	+10.2
Turnout		3,951	42.6	+3.5
Liberal Democrats gain from Conservative		Swing		

=== 2006 Election ===
The incumbent was Grenville Horsfal for the Conservative Party.

Skircoat Ward 2006
Party	Candidate	Votes	%	±%
Conservative	Grenville Horsfall	1,419	40.5	−14.5
Liberal Democrats	Stephen Alexander Gow	1,410	40.3	+20.4
Green	Vivienne Patricia Smith	343	9.8	+9.8
Labour	Mohammed Ilyas Najib	330	9.4	−10.8
Majority		9	0.3	−34.6
Turnout		3,534	39.1	
Conservative hold		Swing		

=== 2004 Election ===
The ward was created after boundary changes in the 2004 election. All three councillor posts were up for election and each elector had three votes.

Skircoat Ward 2004
Party	Candidate	Votes	%	±%
Conservative	Geoffrey Wainwright	2,367	20.08	−
Conservative	John Frank Brearley Ford	2,167	18.4	−
Conservative	Grenville Horsfall	1,948	16.5	−
Liberal Democrats	Stephen Alexander Gow	1,002	8.5	−
Labour	David Charles Russell	862	7.3	−
Liberal Democrats	Sheila Jackson	782	6.6	−
Labour	James Frederick Wilson	759	6.4	−
Labour	Maura Wilson	754	6.4	−
BNP	Stuart Brian Gill	582	4.9	−
Liberal Democrats	Rafael Hassan Babar	561	4.8	−
Turnout		4,518		−

The same results expressed by party

Skircoat Ward 2004
List	Candidates	Votes	Of total (%)	± from prev.
Conservative	Geoffrey Wainwright; John Ford; Grenville Horsfall	6,482	55.0	−
Labour	-	2,375	20.2	−
Liberal Democrats	-	2,345	19.9	−
BNP	-	582	4.9	−
Majority		4,107	34.9	−
Turnout		4,518		−
