= 2018 Calderdale Metropolitan Borough Council election =

2018 local election in England

Calderdale Metropolitan Borough Council Elections, 2018
- 3 May 2018

One third (17 of 51) to Calderdale Metropolitan Borough Council 26 seats needed for a majority
	First party	Second party	Third party
Leader	Tim Swift	Scott Benton	James Baker
Party	Labour	Conservative	Liberal Democrats
Leader's seat	Town	Brighouse	Warley
Seats won	10, 58.8%	4, 23.5%	2, 11.8%
Seat change	▲1	▼1	▲1
Popular vote	28,142	21,183	6,521
Percentage	46.3%	34.8%	10.7%
Swing	▲8.4%	▲4.9%	▼4.7%
Council control before election
No Overall Control
Council control after election
No Overall Control

2018 local election results in Calderdale

The 2018 Calderdale Metropolitan Borough Council election took place on 3 May 2018 to elect members of Calderdale Metropolitan Borough Council in England. This was on the same day as other local elections. One councillor was elected in each ward for a four-year term so the councillors elected in 2018 last stood for election in 2014. Each ward is represented by three councillors, the election of which is staggered, so only one third of the councillors were elected in this election. Before the election there was no overall control with a minority Labour administration. Following the election Labour, having gained one councillor, was still two councillors away from a majority so it remained no overall control.

Independent Conservative Councillor Mike Payne of Sowerby Bridge Ward, who was suspended from the Conservative Party in April 2018, was reinstated into the party during this election cycle.

== Council results ==
2018 Calderdale Metropolitan Borough Council election
Party	Candidates						Votes		
Party	Stood	Elected	Gained	Unseated	Net	% of total	%	No.	Net %
Labour	17	10	2	1	▲1	58.8	41.9	25,453	9.2
Conservative	17	4	1	2	▼1	23.5	34.8	21,183	5.0
Liberal Democrats	16	2	1	0	▲1	11.8	10.7	6,521	-1.5
Independent	4	1	0	1	▼1	5.9	7.6	4,631	1.6
Green	17	0	0	0	Steady	0.0	4.2	2,570	-2.6
Yorkshire	1	0	0	0	Steady	0.0	0.3	174	0.3
National Front	1	0	0	0	Steady	0.0	0.2	98	0.2

== Council Composition ==
Prior to the election the composition of the council was:

↓
23	20	1	5	2
Labour	Conservative	IC	Lib Dem	Ind

After the election the composition of the council was:

↓
24	19	1	6	1
Labour	Conservative	IC	Lib Dem	Ind

Party	Previous council	New council
Labour	23	24
Conservative	20	19
Liberal Democrats	5	6
Independent	2	1
Ind. Conservative	1	1
Total	51	51

== Reaction ==
The local paper, the Halifax Courier, said that the Labour group were happiest with the result having got closer to overall control. When the leaders of the groups were later interviewed, Tim Swift, leader of the Labour group, highlighted the win of Skircoat ward and said that the overall result was pretty good for Labour. James Baker, leader of the Liberal Democrat group, highlighted the first win of a new ward in Calderdale as opposed to merely a successful defence since 2010 when the national Liberal Democrat party went into coalition with the Conservatives in the UK parliament. Baker said that they would work with labour to get what they could of their policies enacted. Scott Benton, leader of the Conservative group, highlighted that Labour had failed to gain overall control despite the point in the national political cycle being a good time for opposition parties. Specifically Labour had been in opposition for 8 years at this point. Benton described the Conservative performance as solid.

== Ward results ==
The ward results listed below are based on the changes from the last time this third was up for election, in the 2014 elections, not taking into account any mid-term by-elections or party defections.

=== Brighouse ward ===
Brighouse
Party	Candidate	Votes	%	±%
Conservative	Howard Granville Blagborough	2,065	58.2	31.3
Labour	Oliver George Willows	1,238	34.9	13.2
Liberal Democrats	Jennie Rigg	134	3.8	0.7
Green	Kate Sweeny	107	3.0	3.0
Majority		827	23.3	0.1
Turnout		3,550	42.8	3.4
Conservative hold		Swing	9.1	

The incumbent was Howard Blagborough for the Conservative Party. In the 2014 election both a UKIP candidate & an Independent candidate got over 20% of the vote but neither stood in this election. The swing is expressed between the Conservative & Labour Parties.

=== Calder ward ===
Calder
Party	Candidate	Votes	%	±%
Labour	Sarah Courtney	3,075	61.9	24.1
Conservative	Richard Hugh Marshall	1,015	20.4	5.9
Liberal Democrats	Donal Antony Martin O'Hanlon	460	9.3	−6.1
Green	Jenny Shepherd	399	8.0	−12.0
Majority		2,060	41.5	18.2
Turnout		4,964	53.8	8.5
Labour hold		Swing	18.0	

The incumbent was Alison Miles for the Labour Party who stepped down at this election. The swing is expressed between Labour & Green as Green were second in 2014. There was a 9.1% swing from Conservatives to Labour.

=== Elland ward ===
Elland
Party	Candidate	Votes	%	±%
Labour	Angie Gallagher	1,507	44.3	12.7
Conservative	David Collins	1,417	41.7	11.7
Liberal Democrats	Michael Wallace Whiting	302	8.9	−18.3
Green	Barry Edward Crossland	169	5.0	−2.8
Majority		90	2.6	1.0
Turnout		3,399	39.1	5.1
Labour hold		Swing	0.5	

The incumbent was Angie Gallagher for the Labour Party.

=== Greetland & Stainland ward ===
Greetland & Stainland
Party	Candidate	Votes	%	±%
Liberal Democrats	Marilyn Greenwood	1,706	49.9	19.6
Conservative	Oliver Darryl Williams	1,098	32.1	3.8
Labour	Mike Barnes	498	14.6	1.1
Green	Mark Richard Mullany	112	3.3	−2.6
Majority		608	17.8	15.8
Turnout		3,420	40.1	4.1
Liberal Democrats hold		Swing	7.9	

The incumbent was Marilyn Greenwood for the Liberal Democrats. UKIP did not stand a candidate this time where they had polled over 20% last time. The swing is from Conservative to Liberal.

=== Hipperholme & Lightcliffe ward ===
Hipperholme & Lightcliffe
Party	Candidate	Votes	%	±%
Independent	Colin Raistrick	1,484	41.5	−14.5
Conservative	James Pillai	1,267	35.5	8.7
Labour	Steven Cliberon	600	16.8	3.4
Green	Martin John Hey	110	3.1	3.1
Liberal Democrats	Alisdair Calder McGregor	105	2.9	−0.3
Majority		217	6.1	−23.2
Turnout		3,574	39.8	1.9
Independent hold		Swing	-11.6	

The incumbent was Colin Raistrick, an Independent. The swing was 11.6 from Independent to Conservative & there was a 2.7% swing from Labour to Conservative.

=== Illingworth & Mixenden ward ===
Illingworth & Mixenden
Party	Candidate	Votes	%	±%
Labour	Dan Sutherland	1,398	52.0	10.8
Conservative	Guy Beech	1,005	37.3	18.4
Green	Angela Christine Street	118	4.4	4.4
Independent	Sean Loftus	103	3.8	3.8
Liberal Democrats	Alexander Parsons-Hulse	65	2.4	−0.1
Majority		393	14.6	10.1
Turnout		2,691	30.0	−1.3
Labour hold		Swing	-3.8	

The incumbent was Dan Sutherland for the Labour Party. There was a swing of 3.8% from Labour to Conservative. UKIP which did not stand this time got over 35% of the vote in 2014.

=== Luddendenfoot ward ===
Luddendenfoot
Party	Candidate	Votes	%	±%
Labour	Scott Anthony Patient	1,984	51.1	17.3
Conservative	Jill Smith-Moorhouse	1,428	36.8	2.4
Liberal Democrats	Catherine Jane Crosland	307	7.9	−5.9
Green	Michael John Prior	150	3.9	−12.9
Majority		556	14.3	13.8
Turnout		3,884	48.4	8.5
Labour gain from Conservative		Swing	7.4	

The incumbent was Jill Smith-Moorhouse for the Conservative Party. The biggest swing was 15.1% from Green to Labour.

=== Northowram & Shelf ward ===
Northowram & Shelf
Party	Candidate	Votes	%	±%
Conservative	Stephen Baines	2,119	63.1	21.2
Labour	Helen Sutcliffe	808	24.1	4
Yorkshire	Daniel Richard Manning	174	5.2	5.2
Green	Elaine Hey	151	4.5	4.5
Liberal Democrats	Jon Grinham	96	2.9	−0.1
Majority		1,311	39.1	31.6
Turnout		3,356	37.0	1.2
Conservative hold		Swing	8.6	

The incumbent was Stephen Baines for the Conservative party who was the deputy leader of the Conservative group at the time of the election. UKIP was second place in 2014 with almost 35% of the vote but did not stand this time.

=== Ovenden ward ===
Ovenden
Party	Candidate	Votes	%	±%
Labour	Helen Josephine Rivron	1,043	54.8	−4.9
Conservative	Gill Tolley	583	30.7	4.7
Green	Katherine Louise Horner	194	10.2	10.2
Liberal Democrats	John Reynolds	78	4.1	−5.6
Majority		460	24.2	−9.6
Turnout		1,902	22.7	0.1
Labour hold		Swing	-4.8	

The incumbent was Helen Rivron for the Labour Party. There was a swing of 4.8% from Labour to Conservative. The biggest swing was 7.9% from Liberal to Green.

=== Park ward ===
Park
Party	Candidate	Votes	%	±%
Labour	Mohammad Naeem	2,800	56.6	−5.9
Independent	Surraya Bibi	1,742	35.2	35.2
Conservative	Amjad Mahmood Bashir	245	5.0	−24.0
Green	Finn Mygind	143	2.9	−1.8
Majority		1,058	21.4	−12.1
Turnout		4,949	53.4	4.1
Labour hold		Swing	-20.6	

The incumbent was Ferman Ali for the Labour Party who stepped down at this election. Amjad Bashir standing for the Conservatives is a sitting MEP for Yorkshire & Humber where he was elected for UKIP and defected to the Conservatives. There was a 20.6% swing from Labour to the Independent and a 29.6% swing from Conservatives to the Independent. Surraya Bibi standing as an Independent was previously a member of the Labour Party but resigned complaining that the candidate selection process was not working correctly.

=== Rastrick ward ===
Rastrick
Party	Candidate	Votes	%	±%
Conservative	Regan Gerhard Dickenson	1,945	56.5	5.1
Labour Co-op	Peter Judge	1,213	35.3	2.4
Liberal Democrats	Kathy Haigh-Hutchinson	154	4.5	−1.9
Green	Angharad Lois Turner	123	3.6	3.6
Majority		732	21.3	2.7
Turnout		3,440	41.7	7.0
Conservative hold		Swing	1.4	

The incumbent was Christine Beal for the Conservative Party who stood down at this election. TUSC which did not stand this time had polled 8.1% in 2014.

=== Ryburn ward ===
Ryburn
Party	Candidate	Votes	%	±%
Conservative	Steven Leigh	1,451	38.2	−12.1
Independent	Robert Holden	1,302	34.3	34.3
Labour Co-op	David William Veitch	805	21.2	−5.1
Liberal Democrats	Rosemary Tatchell	131	3.5	−2.7
Green	Katie Witham	98	2.6	−13.4
Majority		149	3.9	−20.1
Turnout		3,794	43.4	9.0
Conservative gain from Independent		Swing	-23.2	

The incumbent was Robert Holden, standing as an Independent. He was elected for the Conservative Party in 2014 but resigned after whistleblowing over irregularities in the 2015 election accounts having also disagreed with the 2016 candidate selection.

=== Skircoat ward ===
Skircoat
Party	Candidate	Votes	%	±%
Labour	Colin Hugh Hutchinson	2,017	46.8	25.5
Conservative	Andrew James Tagg	1,963	45.5	11.4
Liberal Democrats	Sean Bamforth	196	4.5	−14.4
Green	Anne Marie Nelson	127	2.9	−5.2
Majority		54	1.3	−11.6
Turnout		4,312	45.2	6.6
Labour gain from Conservative		Swing	7.1	

The incumbent was Andrew Tagg for the Conservative Party. UKIP polled 17% in 2014 but did not stand this time. The local paper described this result as a shock and the first time Skircoat ward had been held by Labour since the formation of Calderdale council 44 years earlier.

=== Sowerby Bridge ward ===
Sowerby Bridge
Party	Candidate	Votes	%	±%
Labour	Dot Foster	1,636	50.4	17.9
Conservative	Jeff Featherstone	1,259	38.8	13.3
Liberal Democrats	Tom Stringfellow	186	5.7	−1.4
Green	John Richard Ward Nesbitt	152	4.7	−3.0
Majority		377	11.6	5.9
Turnout		3,243	37.8	3.2
Labour hold		Swing	2.3	

The incumbent was Dot Foster for the Labour Party. UKIP did not stand this time but polled 27% in 2014. There was a swing of 2.3% from Conservatives to Labour.

=== Todmorden ward ===
Todmorden
Party	Candidate	Votes	%	±%
Labour	Susan Mary Press	1,976	54.1	19.3
Conservative	Jacob Nathaniel Cook	704	19.3	−5.4
Liberal Democrats	Janet Mary Battye	630	17.3	−7.8
Green	Kieran Luke Turner	232	6.4	−7.8
National Front	Chris Jackson	98	2.7	2.7
Majority		1,272	34.8	24.8
Turnout		3,652	40.5	3.5
Labour hold		Swing	12.4	

The incumbent was Susan Press for the Labour Party.

=== Town ward ===
Town
Party	Candidate	Votes	%	±%
Labour	Bob Metcalfe	1,392	53.4	13.1
Conservative	Mark Llewellyn Edwards	971	37.3	19.6
Green	Alan Patrick McDonald	127	4.9	4.9
Liberal Democrats	Benjamin George Simmons	102	3.9	−0.1
Majority		421	16.2	−6.6
Turnout		2,606	29.9	0.2
Labour hold		Swing	-3.3	

The incumbent was Bob Metcalfe for the Labour Party. UKIP polled 37% in 2014 but did not stand this time.

=== Warley ward ===
Warley
Party	Candidate	Votes	%	±%
Liberal Democrats	Amanda Parsons-Hulse	1,869	46.1	17.4
Labour	Audrey Smith	1,463	36.1	1.4
Conservative	Shakir Saghir	648	16.0	−12.2
Green	Frank James Holt	58	1.4	−5.8
Majority		406	10.0	4.1
Turnout		4,052	44.7	6.4
Liberal Democrats gain from Labour		Swing	8.0	

The incumbent was Michelle Foster for the Labour Party who stood down at this election. There was a swing of 8.0% from Labour to Liberal Democrat & the largest swing was 14.8% from Conservative to Liberal Democrat.
