= 2014 Calderdale Metropolitan Borough Council election =

2014 UK local government election

Calderdale Metropolitan Borough Council Elections, 2014
- 22 May 2014

One third (17 of 51) to Calderdale Metropolitan Borough Council 26 seats needed for a majority
	First party	Second party	Third party
Leader	Tim Swift	Stephen Baines	Janet Battye
Party	Labour	Conservative	Liberal Democrats
Leader's seat	Town	Northowram & Shelf	Calder
Seats won	9, 52.9%	6, 35.3%	1, 5.9%
Seat change	▲4	▲2	▼5
Popular vote	17,520	15,981	6,565
Percentage	32.7%	29.8%	12.2%
Swing	▲6.6%	▼1.9%	▼17.0%
Council control before election
No Overall Control
Council control after election
No Overall Control

The 2014 Calderdale Metropolitan Borough Council election took place on 22 May 2014 to elect members of Calderdale Metropolitan Borough Council in England. This was on the same day as local elections across the United Kingdom and a European election. One councillor was elected in each of the 17 wards for a four-year term. There are three councillors representing each ward elected on a staggered basis so one third of the councillor seats were up for re-election. The seats had previously been contested in 2010 which was held in conjunction with a general election. The turnout was significantly lower in 2014 than in 2010 which is not unusual when comparing local elections that coincide with general elections to ones that do not. Prior to the election Labour was the largest party in the council with 21 out of 51 seats, 5 seats short of an overall majority. After the election there was no overall control of the council. Labour had 25 seats, only one short of a majority and so Labour continued to operate a minority administration.

In July 2014 a vote of no confidence was taken about the Labour minority administration. A surprise victory for the motion led to the Conservatives forming a minority administration.

All of the percentage changes in the tables below are expressed in relation to the election results in 2010 when the same candidates were up for election. The swings & changes are often smaller when compared to the election of the previous & subsequent councillors in the same wards in the 2012 & 2015 elections.

The wards of Calderdale coloured in red for Labour, Blue for Conservative, Yellow for Liberal Democrats & grey for Independent.

== Council results ==
2014 Calderdale Metropolitan Borough Council election
Party	Candidates						Votes		
Party	Stood	Elected	Gained	Unseated	Net	% of total	%	No.	Net %
Labour	17	9	4	0	▲4	52.9	32.7	17,520	▲6.6
Conservative	17	6	3	1	▲2	35.3	29.8	15,981	▼1.9
Liberal Democrats	17	1	0	5	▼5	5.9	12.2	6,565	▼17.0
Independent	4	1	0	1	▼1	5.9	6.0	3,207	▲1.1
UKIP	7	0	0	0	0	0.0	11.0	5,878	▲11.0
Green	10	0	0	0	0	0.0	6.8	3,651	▲4.2
TUSC	3	0	0	0	0	0.0	0.6	327	▲0.6

== Council Composition ==
Prior to the election the composition of the council was:

↓
21	17	11	2
Labour	Conservative	Lib Dem	Ind

After the election the composition of the council was:

↓
25	19	6	1
Labour	Conservative	Lib Dem	Ind

Party	Previous council	New council
Labour	21	25
Conservative	17	19
Liberal Democrat	11	6
Independent	2	1
Total	51	51

== Ward results ==
=== Brighouse ward ===
Brighouse
Party	Candidate	Votes	%	±%
Conservative	Howard Blagbrough	897	26.9	▲3.5
Independent	Colin Stout	758	22.7	▼11.6
Labour	Anthony John Rutherford	725	21.7	▲2.5
UKIP	Nick Yates	725	21.7	▲21.7
Independent	Danny Murphy	122	3.7	▲3.7
Liberal Democrats	Jennie Dawn Rigg	102	3.1	▼19.5
Majority		775	23.2	▼0.1
Turnout		3340	39.3	▼26.8
Conservative gain from Independent		Swing	▲7.6	

The incumbent was Colin Stout as an Independent.

=== Calder ward ===
Calder
Party	Candidate	Votes	%	±%
Labour	Alison Miles	1,547	37.9	▲14.9
Green	Kate Sweeny	817	20.0	▲8.6
Liberal Democrats	Mike Smith	628	15.4	▼26.1
Conservative	Nicola Jayne May	595	14.6	▼9.0
Independent	Stephen Denis Curry	466	11.4	▲11.4
Majority		952	23.3	▲5.4
Turnout		4084	45.3	▼27.6
Labour hold		Swing	▲20.5	

The incumbent was Nader Fekri who stepped down at this election after defecting to Labour from the Liberal Democrats in 2012 saying that he could no longer support the coalition in the national parliament with the Conservatives.

=== Elland ward ===
Elland
Party	Candidate	Votes	%	±%
Labour	Angie Gallagher	903	31.7	▲7.5
Conservative	Sue Hall	855	30.0	▼0.2
Liberal Democrats	David Hardy	775	27.2	▼13.5
Green	Susan Ann Thomas	221	7.7	▲3.6
TUSC	Abigail Elizabeth Mary Shaw	72	2.5	▲2.5
Majority		48	1.7	▼8.8
Turnout		2852	34.0	▼25.3
Labour gain from Liberal Democrats		Swing	▲10.5	

The incumbent was David Hardy for the Liberal Democrats.

=== Greetland & Stainland ward ===
Greetland & Stainland
Party	Candidate	Votes	%	±%
Liberal Democrats	Christine Marilyn Greenwood	929	30.3	▼15.3
Conservative	Chris Pearson	869	28.4	▼4.8
UKIP	Angela Thompson	647	21.1	▲21.1
Labour	Jim Gallagher	412	13.4	▼2.5
Green	Mark Richard Mullany	179	5.8	▲1.2
TUSC	Luke Anthony Gill	21	0.7	▲0.7
Majority		60	2.0	▼10.5
Turnout		3,065	36.0	▼30.4
Liberal Democrats hold		Swing	▼5.2	

The incumbent was Conrad Winterburn for the Liberal Democrats who stood down at this election.

=== Hipperholme & Lightcliffe ward ===
Hipperholme & Lightcliffe
Party	Candidate	Votes	%	±%
Independent	Colin Raistrick	1,861	56.0	▲19.3
Conservative	Joe Clegg	888	26.7	▼6.0
Labour	Pam Fellows	445	13.4	▼2.5
Liberal Democrats	Mat Bowles	106	3.2	▼11.1
Majority		973	29.3	▲25.3
Turnout		3,321	37.9	▼31.6
Independent hold		Swing	▲12.6	

The incumbent was Colin Raistrick as an Independent.

=== Illingworth & Mixenden ward ===
Illingworth & Mixenden
Party	Candidate	Votes	%	±%
Labour	Daniel James Sutherland	1,160	41.1	▲4.7
UKIP	David Ian Ginley	1,032	36.6	▲36.6
Conservative	Danny Holmes	534	18.9	▼6.7
Liberal Democrats	Glen Mattock	72	2.6	▼10.3
Majority		128	4.5	▼6.3
Turnout		2,820	31.3	▼26.9
Labour hold		Swing	▼16.0	

The incumbent was Daniel Sutherland for the Labour Party. The swing is expressed between Labour & UKIP.

=== Luddendenfoot ward ===
Luddendenfoot
Party	Candidate	Votes	%	±%
Conservative	Jill Smith-Moorhouse	1,101	34.3	▲4.9
Labour	Charlotte Constance Brady	1,084	33.8	▲15.1
Green	Elizabeth Jane King	539	16.8	▲11.1
Liberal Democrats	Anthony Robert Hodgins	443	13.8	▼24.8
Majority		17	0.5	▼8.7
Turnout		3,208	39.9	▼30.3
Conservative gain from Liberal Democrats		Swing	▲14.9	

The incumbent was John Beacroft-Mitchell for the Liberal Democrats who stood down at this election.

=== Northowram & Shelf ward ===
Northowram & Shelf
Party	Candidate	Votes	%	±%
Conservative	Stephen Baines	1,338	41.9	▼9.7
UKIP	Philip Crossley	1,100	34.5	▲34.5
Labour	Gary Walsh	642	20.1	▼0.3
Liberal Democrats	Michael Taylor	94	2.9	▼15.7
Majority		238	7.5	▼23.7
Turnout		3191	35.8	▼34.3
Conservative hold		Swing	▼22.1	

The incumbent was Stephen Baines for the Conservative Party. The swing is expressed between the Conservative Party & UKIP.

=== Ovenden ward ===
Ovenden
Party	Candidate	Votes	%	±%
Labour	Helen Josephine Rivron	1,102	59.7	▲14.4
Conservative	John Shoesmith	479	25.9	▼5.3
Liberal Democrats	John Dennis Reynolds	180	9.8	▼6.6
Majority		623	33.7	▲9.1
Turnout		1,846	22.6	▼26.7
Labour hold		Swing	▲4.6	

The incumbent was Helen Rivron for the Labour Party.

=== Park ward ===
Park
Party	Candidate	Votes	%	±%
Labour	Ferman Ali	2,762	62.5	▲19.7
Conservative	Shakir Saghir	1,281	29.0	▲7.5
Green	Patrick Moran	206	4.7	▲4.7
Liberal Democrats	Craig Whittall	135	3.1	▼30.3
Majority		1,481	33.5	▲24.1
Turnout		4,421	49.2	▼12.2
Labour hold		Swing	▲6.1	

The incumbent was Ferman Ali for the Labour Party.

=== Rastrick ward ===
Rastrick
Party	Candidate	Votes	%	±%
Conservative	Christine Beal	1,480	51.4	▲4.3
Labour	Peter Judge	946	32.9	▲7.1
TUSC	Robert Golding Bailey	234	8.1	▲8.1
Liberal Democrats	Kathleen Haigh-Hutchinson	183	6.4	▼20.0
Majority		534	18.6	▼2.2
Turnout		2,877	34.6	▼29.7
Conservative hold		Swing	▼1.4	

The incumbent was Christine Beal for the Conservative Party.

=== Ryburn ward ===
Ryburn
Party	Candidate	Votes	%	±%
Conservative	Rob Holden	1,513	50.3	▲5.5
Labour	Judy Gannon	791	26.3	▲0.3
Green	Freda Mary Davis	482	16.0	▲11.2
Liberal Democrats	Rosemary Tatchell	186	6.2	▼17.5
Majority		722	24.0	▲5.2
Turnout		3,008	34.4	▼34.0
Conservative hold		Swing	▲2.6	

The incumbent was Kay Barret for the Conservative Party who stepped down at this election.

=== Skircoat ward ===
Skircoat
Party	Candidate	Votes	%	±%
Conservative	Andrew Tagg	1,252	34.1	▼1.2
Labour	Alistair John Millington	780	21.3	▲4.2
Liberal Democrats	Margaret Pauline Elizabeth Nash	696	19.0	▼22.6
UKIP	Grenville Horsfall	628	17.1	▲17.1
Green	Gary Michael Scott	300	8.2	▲3.3
Majority		472	12.9	▼5.5
Turnout		3,668	38.6	▼30.0
Conservative gain from Liberal Democrats		Swing	▲10.7	

The incumbent was Pauline Nash for the Liberal Democrats.

=== Sowerby Bridge ward ===
Sowerby Bridge
Party	Candidate	Votes	%	±%
Labour	Dot Foster	959	32.5	▲0.3
UKIP	Geoffrey Thompson	790	26.8	▲26.8
Conservative	Mike Payne	753	25.5	▼10.7
Green	Charles Gate	227	7.7	▲7.7
Liberal Democrats	Tom Stringfellow	209	7.1	▼22.3
Majority		169	5.7	▲1.7
Turnout		2,948	34.6	▼27.0
Labour gain from Conservative		Swing	▲5.5	

The incumbent was Martin Peel for the Conservative Party who stood down at this election.

=== Todmorden ward ===
Todmorden
Party	Candidate	Votes	%	±%
Labour	Susan Press	1,104	34.8	▲8.7
Liberal Democrats	Margareta Holmstedt	796	25.1	▼8.2
Conservative	Mark Scott Gledhill	784	24.7	▼4.3
Green	Oxana Nikolaevna Poberejnaia	448	14.1	▲7.9
Majority		320	10.1	▲5.7
Turnout		3,176	37.0	▼28.0
Labour gain from Liberal Democrats		Swing	▲8.4	

The incumbent was Ruth Goldthorpe for the Liberal Democrats who stepped down at this election.

=== Town ward ===
Town
Party	Candidate	Votes	%	±%
Labour	Bob Metcalfe	1,039	40.3	▲1.3
UKIP	Phillip Charlton	956	37.1	▲37.1
Conservative	Stephen Richard Collins	454	17.6	▼6.3
Liberal Democrats	Ruth Coleman-Taylor	104	4.0	▼13.6
Majority		585	22.7	▲7.6
Turnout		2,575	29.6	▼26.3
Labour hold		Swing	▲3.8	

The incumbent was Bob Metcalfe for the Labour Party. The swing is expressed between Labour & Conservatives who were second in 2010.

=== Warley ward ===
Warley
Party	Candidate	Votes	%	±%
Labour	Michelle Jane Foster	1,119	34.7	▲8.3
Liberal Democrats	Ashley Evans	927	28.8	▼6.3
Conservative	Keith Hutson	908	28.2	▲3.4
Green	John Richard Ward Nesbitt	232	7.2	▲7.2
Majority		192	6.0	▼2.7
Turnout		3,224	38.3	▼25.4
Labour gain from Liberal Democrats		Swing	▲7.3	

The incumbent was Ashley Evans for the Liberal Democrats.
