= Price adjustment =

Price adjustment may refer to:

- Quantity adjustment, a concept in economics related to changes in price and quantity
- Price adjustment (retail), a retail policy also called price protection
- Pricing, the process of determining what a company will receive in exchange for its product or service
- Purchase price adjustment, the change in value of an asset between negotiation and closing
