= Second home =

Second home or Second Home may refer to:

- Dacha, a type of non-primary residence found in Russia and post-Soviet countries
- Holiday cottage, a non-primary residence owned for tourism reasons
- Move-up home, a house purchased when selling a starter home
- Pied-à-terre, a non-primary residence generally found in urban centers
- Second Home, an album by Marié Digby
- Vacation rental, a non-primary residence owned for vacation purposes

== See also ==
- Second Home Rule Bill, the Government of Ireland Bill 1893
