= Re-trade =

Practice of renegotiating the purchase price of a property or company

A re-trade is the practice of renegotiating the purchase price of a property or company by the buyer after initially agreeing to purchase at a higher price. Typically this occurs after the buyer gets the property under contract and during the period that it is performing due diligence. The buyer may raise a due diligence issue and demand a purchase price adjustment to a lower re-trade price. The seller can be left in a bad situation where it must either accept the lower price or lose the sale and re-market the property. Moreover, loss of the sale can affect an entire chain of related transactions (such as when the sale is a down-leg in a tax-deferred "1031" exchange), thereby increasing even further the pressure upon the seller to accept the lower price in order to salvage the related transactions and avoid a ripple effect.

The purpose of a due diligence period is to allow the buyer to fully investigate all of the claims, warranties, and representations a seller has made. There are times when buyers are justified in seeking an adjustment, as in the case of a discovery that certain deal fundamentals are not supportable under the scrutiny of the buyer's due diligence. Other times, however, buyers may seek to utilize perceived leverage in a transaction to drive the price down. In this scenario, the buyer fails to turn up anything significant, but still wants to lower the price.

In troubled real estate markets, like that experienced in the Great Recession of the late 2000s, it was common for some buyers to intentionally misuse the due diligence process and to initially offer a higher price than they are actually willing to pay in order to control the property and renegotiate later. This strategy preyed upon the desperation of sellers and the paucity of buyers in the market.

Some sophisticated sellers are adopting the strategy of refusing to renegotiate so as not to reward the practice and to discourage re-trade buyers. On the other side of the purchase/sale transaction, some buyers attempt to distinguish themselves from the practice and pride themselves as having a strict "no re-trade" policy, touting that they do all their due diligence up front and don't demand last minute purchase price reductions.

== See also ==
- Gazumping
- Gazundering
