= List of annual events in Syracuse =

List of events held in the Syracuse, New York metropolitan area on an annual basis, by type.

== Art fairs, shows, and galleries ==
- Art on the Porches (Ruskin Ave, Strathmore Neighborhood, Syracuse)
- Syracuse Arts and Crafts Festival
- Festival of Trees (Everson Museum)
- Gingerbread Gallery (Erie Canal Museum)
- Austn Park Annual Art & Craft show/sale, Skaneateles

== Ethnic festivals ==
- Bavarianfest
- CNY Scottish Games & Celtic Festival
- New York India Festival
- CNY Scottish Games
- Euro Fest
- George W. Fowler High School Muticultural Festival
- Greek Cultural Festival
- International Taste Festival
- Irish Festival
- Italian Festival (La Festa Italiana)
- Jewish Music & Cultural Festival
- Latin American Festival
- Middle Eastern Cultural Festival
- Oktoberfest
- Polish Festival
- Southeast Asian Festival
- St. George Macedonian Ethnic Festival
- St. John the Baptist Ukrainian Festival
- St. Patrick's Irish Festival & Street Fair
- St. Sophia's Greek Festival
- Westcott Street Cultural Fair

== Film ==
- Syracuse International Film Festival

== Food ==
- Brew At The Zoo (Rosamond Gifford Zoo)
- Chicken Wing Festival
- Strawberry Festival
- Taste of Syracuse
- Tomatofest
- Central New York Brewfest
- Empire Brewfest

== Historical ==
- Canal Day

== Holiday related ==
- First Night
- Juneteenth celebration
- Syracuse St. Patrick's Parade
- Autumn Equinox Festival
- Thanksgiving Day Parade
- Veterans Day Ceremony & Parade
- The Great Zoo Boo

== Music ==
- Syracuse Jazz Festival
- CNY Bluegrass Association Festival
- Empire State Brewing and Music Festival
- CNY JazzFest
- Jazz in the Square
- New York State Blues Festival
- Party in the Plaza concert series
- Syracuse Area Music Awards
- World in the Square

== Parades, processions, walks, and marches ==
- CNY
- CNY Society for the Prevention of Cruelty to Animals Walk
- Hiroshima/Nagasaki Procession
- Syracuse St. Patrick's Parade

== Performing arts ==
- Syracuse International Arts & Puppet Festival
- Shakespeare-in-the-Park

== Races and competitions ==
- Human Dogsled Race
- Parks Run 4 Mile Race: Onondaga Park in Syracuse's Strathmore Neighborhood
- Syracuse Festival of Races
- Syrathon
- Syracuse Half Marathon

== Regional fairs and festivals ==
- Great New York State Fair (late August to Labor day)
- Harborfest (Oswego, last weekend of July)
- Skaneateles Festival
- Solvay Summer Festival
- Armed Forces Day, held in conjunction with a Syracuse Chiefs Baseball game
- Super DIRT Week

== Unsorted ==
- Apple Festival
- Balloon Fest
- Lights on the Lake
- Rose Day
- RetroGameCon
- Parade of Homes
- Art on Parade
- Syracuse Nationals
- Syracuse Winterfest
