= Downsizing (property) =

Moving to a smaller property

Downsizing refers to when a buyer purchases a property which is smaller in size or lower in value than their current home.

== Reasons to downsize ==
There are multiple reasons why a buyer may want to downsize, such as having less inhabitants in the home, a higher cost in bills or wanting a change of location.

An analysis of Finnish households found that downsizing was more appealing to lower income, single-person households. Downsizers valued the presence of services that would enable aging in place.

A survey of older Australian families that chose to downsize identified four primary factors contributing to the choice to downsize: a desire for a change in lifestyle, an inability to maintain the home, children moving out of the household, and retirement.

== Difficulties with downsizing ==
Many people downsizing from a larger property to a smaller one will find their current possessions, appliances and furnishings will be unable to fit in the new smaller home. Some people will find it especially difficult to accept the need to dispose of possessions, and this will cause some considerable anxiety. Following a disposal methodology can be a useful approach if the task seems impossible: One approach is to determine what furniture, displayed items and commonly used items are suitable for and will fit in the new home: remaining belongings will need to be sorted into what is to be kept and what is to be disposed of.

== Disposal strategies ==
After the basic fundamental items that will move to the new home have been determined, there will remain a set whose fate will need to be decided.

== See also ==
- Home equity loan
- Property ladder
- Move-up home
- Downshifting
