= Chain-free property =

A chain-free property is a property that is being sold by a vendor (home seller) who does not need to purchase a new property after they sell. Only 10% of all property transactions in the United Kingdom are chain-free.

== Origins of the term ==
The term 'property chain' is common in real estate, especially in the UK. The chain is the line of people buying and selling. For example, there might be a first-time buyer trying to purchase a small flat, another person waiting to move from the flat to a small house, another person waiting to move from the small house to a larger house, and so on. If one person drops out of the chain, the sellers are not able to continue with their moves and the chain collapses.

== Reasons for chain-free properties ==
Chain-free properties are available for numerous reasons:

- Homeowner reasons – the current homeowner has already a new home to move to, the seller is not buying a new home, emigration, selling on behalf of a deceased relative
- Financial institutions (lenders, banks and building societies) – after acquiring properties thorough repossession, probate or equity release, they are re-sold on the open market. As the seller is a company, not a private individual, there is no property chain.
- Home builders – properties that have been acquired in a part-exchange transaction and are being re-sold on the open market. As above, the vendor is a company, not a private individual, so there is no property chain.
- Professional Investors – properties that have been acquired as part of a portfolio, not for the owner to reside in, but as investments. Although a private individual, the vendor is selling for business reasons, not to enable them to move on, making the property sale chain-free.

== See also ==
- Estate agent
- Foreclosure
