= 2026 Calderdale Council election =

2026 English local government election

- 7 May 2026

All 54 seats to Calderdale Council 28 seats needed for a majority
- Registered: 153,587
- Turnout: 69,314; 45.1%

	First party	Second party	Third party
Leader	Daniel Sutherland	Jane Scullion	Martin Hey
Party	Reform	Labour	Green
Last election	Did not contest	11 seats, 26.1%	3 seats, 16.0%
Seats before	3	26	3
Seats won	34	8	7
Seat change	▲34	▼25	▲4
Popular vote	70,417	38,936	39,700
Percentage	37.0%	20.4%	20.8%
Swing	New	▼20.7%	▲4.8%
	Fourth party	Fifth party	Sixth party
Leader	Paul Bellenger
Party	Liberal Democrats	Independent	Workers Party
Last election	6 seats, 10.7%	1 seat, 1.6%	1 seat, 3.2%
Seats before	6	2	1
Seats won	2	2	1
Seat change	▼4	▲1	Steady
Popular vote	13,148	6,846	2,462
Percentage	6.9%	3.6%	1.3%
Swing	▼2.8%	▲2.0%	▼1.9%
	Seventh party
Leader	Howard Blagbrough
Party	Conservative
Last election	11 seats, 26.1%
Seats before	10 (Note: Includes the vacant seats in Brighouse and Hipperholme & Lightcliffe last held by the Conservatives.)
Seats won	0
Seat change	▼11
Popular vote	18,657
Percentage	9.8%
Swing	▼16.3%
- Results by Ward
Leader before election
Jane Scullion
Labour
Leader after election
Daniel Sutherland
Reform

The 2026 Calderdale Council election took place on Thursday 7 May 2026, alongside other local elections in the United Kingdom. All 54 members of Calderdale Council in West Yorkshire were elected following boundary changes.

Prior to the election, the council was under Labour majority control. The incumbent leader, Jane Scullion, did not stand for re-election. At this election, Reform UK gained a majority of seats on the council, winning 34 out of 54 seats. This was the first time since 2015 that Labour did not form the council's administration. The Reform group leader, Daniel Sutherland, was formally appointed as leader of the council at the subsequent annual council meeting on 20 May 2026.

== Background ==
Calderdale was created in 1974 as a metropolitan borough. The Conservatives held control until 1976, when the council fell into no overall control. Labour formed their first majority in 1990 and remained the largest party until 1999. The Conservatives last held a majority from 2000 to 2002; following over a decade of no overall control, Labour won a majority of seats in 2019 and have held control since.

This election was held on a new set of ward boundaries – as such, all seats were up for election. The number of three-member wards increased by one.

== Council composition ==
After 2024 election		Before 2026 election		After 2026 election	
Party	Seats	Party	Seats	Party	Seats
Labour	29	Labour	26	Reform	34
Conservative	11	Conservative	8	Labour	8
Liberal Democrats	6	Liberal Democrats	6	Green	7
Green	3	Green	3	Liberal Democrats	2
Reform	0	Reform	3	Independent	2
Workers Party	1	Workers Party	1	Workers Party	1
Independent	1	Independent	2	Conservative	0
Vacant	N/A	Vacant	2		

Changes 2024–2026:

- September 2024: Josh Fenton-Glynn (Labour) resigns – by-election held October 2024
- October 2024: Jonathan Timbers (Labour) wins by-election
- February 2025: Dan Sutherland (Labour) joins Reform
- March 2025: Mike Barnes (Labour) resigns – by-election held May 2025
- May 2025: Paul Hawkaluk (Reform) gains by-election from Labour
- January 2026:
  - David Kirton (Conservative) dies – seat left vacant until 2026 election
  - Peter Hunt (Conservative) joins Reform
  - Geraldine Carter (Conservative) dies – seat left vacant until 2026 election
- March 2026:
  - Leah Webster (Labour) resigns from the Labour party and sits as an independent

== Election summary ==
2026 Calderdale Metropolitan Borough Council election
Party	Candidates	Elected	Net change	Seats %	Votes %	Votes	Vote change
Reform UK	54	34	▲34	63.0	36.2	70,417	New
Labour	52 (Note: Includes 3 Labour and Co-operative Party candidates.)	8	▼21	14.8	22.1 (Note: Includes 2.1% of the vote received by Labour and Co-operative Party candidates.)	43,024 (Note: Includes 4,088 votes received by Labour and Co-operative Party candidates.)	▼19.0
Green	54	7	▲4	13.0	20.4	39,700	▲4.4
Liberal Democrats	30	2	▼4	3.7	6.8	13,148	▼3.9
Independent	10	2	▲1	3.7	3.5	6,846	▲1.9
Workers Party	5	1	0	1.9	1.3	2,462	▼1.9
Conservative	36	0	▼11	0.0	9.6	18,657	▼16.5
Official Monster Raving Loony Party	1	0	0	0.0	0.1	246	New
Total	242	54	▲3	100.0	100.0	194,500	
Rejected ballots					0.2	169	
Turnout					45.1	69,314	▲10.7
Registered electors						153,587	

== Ward results ==
Incumbent councillors are marked with an asterisk.

=== Brighouse ===
Brighouse
Party	Candidate	Votes	%
Reform	Darren Commons	1,583	40.3
Reform	Stephen Mycroft	1,484	37.8
Reform	Mark Kimberlin	1,470	37.4
Conservative	Howard Blagbrough*	1,049	26.7
Conservative	Tina Benton*	947	24.1
Conservative	Brenda Monteith*	897	22.8
Green	Kim Atkinson	754	19.2
Labour	Samuel Bacon	657	16.7
Green	Megan Nichols	639	16.3
Green	Tea Owens	558	14.2
Labour	Brown Giwa	545	13.9
Labour	Derrie Thickett	531	13.5
Liberal Democrats	Jennie Rigg	267	6.8
Rejected ballots		4	0.1
Turnout		3,935	45.5
Registered electors		8,653	
Reform win (new seat)			
Reform win (new seat)			
Reform win (new seat)			

=== Elland ===
Elland
Party	Candidate	Votes	%
Reform	Peter Hunt*	1,510	48.9
Reform	James Cook	1,357	43.9
Reform	Nigel Hatfield	1,276	41.3
Labour	David Veitch*	904	29.2
Green	Joy Harrison	488	15.8
Green	Barry Crossland	458	14.8
Liberal Democrats	Sammie Hurles-Green	429	13.9
Conservative	Karl Baines	349	11.3
Liberal Democrats	Samuel Jackson	300	9.7
Green	Mark Mullany	300	9.7
Conservative	Steven Holroyd	283	9.2
Conservative	Simon Kay	263	8.5
Liberal Democrats	Donal O'Hanlon	251	8.1
Rejected ballots		5	0.2
Turnout		3,096	41.2
Registered electors		7,514	
Reform win (new seat)			
Reform win (new seat)			
Reform win (new seat)			

=== Greetland ===
Greetland
Party	Candidate	Votes	%
Reform	Thomas Garnett	1,704	46.2
Reform	Ruth Walker	1,559	42.2
Reform	Philip Pringle	1,519	41.1
Liberal Democrats	Paul Bellenger*	1,288	34.9
Liberal Democrats	Sue Holdsworth*	1,067	28.9
Liberal Democrats	Christine Prashad*	1,009	27.3
Green	JD Anderson-Martin	345	9.3
Conservative	Glen Cockroft	336	9.1
Green	Jessica Martin	325	8.8
Green	Lauren Mead	320	8.7
Conservative	Sam Franks	277	7.5
Conservative	Jackie Morris	260	7.0
Labour	Sharron Hardman	217	5.9
Labour	Stuart Murray	177	4.8
Labour	Mark Pitkethly	175	4.7
Rejected ballots		12	0.3
Turnout		3,704	49.6
Registered electors		7,463	
Reform win (new seat)			
Reform win (new seat)			
Reform win (new seat)			

=== Halifax Town ===
Halifax Town
Party	Candidate	Votes	%
Reform	Joseph Gibbons	1,082	37.2
Reform	Keith Ingle	1,040	35.8
Reform	Jay Shaban	927	31.9
Labour	Rhys Owens	752	25.9
Labour	Joe Thompson*	745	25.6
Labour	Kelly Thornham*	703	24.2
Green	Katherine Spivey	568	19.6
Green	Alex McKevitt	563	19.4
Green	Roseanne Sweeney	538	18.5
Workers Party	Aber Saghir	340	11.7
Workers Party	Wajid Hussain	309	10.6
Conservative	Anne Baines	308	10.6
Liberal Democrats	Rachel Proctor	184	6.3
Rejected ballots		10	0.3
Turnout		2,915	35.2
Registered electors		8,289	
Reform win (new seat)			
Reform win (new seat)			
Reform win (new seat)			

=== Hebden Bridge & Todmorden East ===
Hebden Bridge & Todmorden East
Party	Candidate	Votes	%
Labour	Sarah Courtney*	2,397	41.4
Green	Hannah Mickleburgh-Benn	2,049	35.4
Green	Margot Puddepha	1,971	34.0
Green	Kieran Turner	1,852	32.0
Labour	Jonathan Timbers*	1,721	29.7
Labour	Ben Jancovich	1,715	29.6
Independent	Scott Borrows	801	13.8
Reform	James Connolly	786	13.6
Reform	Christine Shaw	730	12.6
Reform	Richard Knockton	714	12.3
Independent	Rebecca Boden	505	8.7
Independent	Mikaela Mills-Brand	427	7.4
Independent	Chris Wood	256	4.4
Conservative	Paul Davies	248	4.3
Conservative	Mark Hill	243	4.2
Conservative	David Sugden	215	3.7
Liberal Democrats	Brian Hewson	197	3.4
Liberal Democrats	David Wainwright	174	3.0
Rejected ballots		9	0.2
Turnout		5,805	62.0
Registered electors		9,360	
Labour win (new seat)			
Green win (new seat)			
Green win (new seat)			

=== Hipperholme & Lightcliffe ===
Hipperholme & Lightcliffe
Party	Candidate	Votes	%
Reform	Timothy Holden	1,470	35.7
Reform	Connor Dent	1,463	35.6
Reform	Valerie Mycroft	1,400	34.0
Conservative	Frederick Philp	1,079	26.2
Conservative	Steven Leigh	1,076	26.2
Conservative	Vishal Gupta	869	21.1
Independent	Mark Pullen	781	19.0
Green	Isabella Greenwood	681	16.6
Green	Aisling Blythe	635	15.4
Labour	Nicola Lovelady	536	13.0
Green	James Turner	529	12.9
Labour	Steven Sewell	463	11.3
Labour	Mick Shannon	428	10.4
Liberal Democrats	James Souper	261	6.3
Rejected ballots		9	0.2
Turnout		4,123	45.8
Registered electors		8,996	
Reform win (new seat)			
Reform win (new seat)			
Reform win (new seat)			

=== Illingworth & Mixenden ===
Illingworth & Mixenden
Party	Candidate	Votes	%
Reform	Nikki Kelly	1,774	57.4
Reform	Dan Sutherland*	1,738	56.2
Reform	Andrew Tagg	1,657	53.6
Labour	Rachel Hollingworth	651	21.1
Labour	Shane Taylor*	574	18.6
Labour	Danny Sweeney	549	17.8
Conservative	Peter Hillman	357	11.6
Green	Jane Smith	323	10.5
Green	Robert Orange	300	9.7
Green	Joseph Scanlon	291	9.4
Liberal Democrats	Nick Proctor	164	5.3
Independent	Seán Loftus	154	5.0
Rejected ballots		5	0.2
Turnout		3,095	37.0
Registered electors		8,357	
Reform win (new seat)			
Reform win (new seat)			
Reform win (new seat)			

=== Luddendenfoot ===
Luddendenfoot
Party	Candidate	Votes	%
Labour	Scott Patient*	1,671	36.9
Labour	Katie Kimber*	1,625	35.9
Labour	Kate Macdonald	1,470	32.5
Reform	Joseph Matthews	1,438	31.8
Reform	Matthew Murray	1,371	30.3
Reform	Christopher Wade	1,365	30.2
Green	Emma Sweaney	887	19.6
Green	Matthew Geraghty	772	17.1
Green	Mark Stanley	711	15.7
Conservative	Jerrad Dann	494	10.9
Conservative	Jules Devlin-Dickenson	446	9.9
Conservative	Paul Worth	429	9.5
Liberal Democrats	Rosemary Tatchell	370	8.2
Rejected ballots		12	0.3
Turnout		4,535	54.0
Registered electors		8,406	
Labour win (new seat)			
Labour win (new seat)			
Labour win (new seat)			

=== Northowram & Shelf ===
Northowram & Shelf
Party	Candidate	Votes	%
Green	Martin Hey*	1,823	49.4
Reform	David Banks	1,591	43.1
Green	Dan Wood*	1,545	41.9
Reform	James Brezinski	1,446	39.2
Reform	Diana Thorpe	1,426	38.7
Green	Chris Ionna	1,395	37.8
Conservative	Naveed Khan	413	11.2
Labour	Alison Dunn	220	6.0
Labour	James Hepplestone	174	4.7
Liberal Democrats	Kathleen Robinson	153	4.1
Labour	Richard Pierson	145	3.9
Rejected ballots		6	0.2
Turnout		3,694	48.3
Registered electors		7,656	
Green win (new seat)			
Reform win (new seat)			
Green win (new seat)			

=== Ovenden ===
Ovenden
Party	Candidate	Votes	%
Reform	Paul Dale	1,531	56.2
Reform	Stephen Hodgson	1,516	55.6
Reform	Gordon Thorpe	1,497	54.9
Labour	Danielle Durrans*	611	22.4
Labour	Mike Barnes	601	22.0
Labour	Stuart Cairney*	568	20.8
Green	Catherine Graham	362	13.3
Green	Luna Moon	300	11.0
Green	Finn Jensen	295	10.8
Conservative	Peter Caffrey	245	9.0
Liberal Democrats	Steve Whitaker	155	5.7
Rejected ballots		5	0.2
Turnout		2,731	31.1
Registered electors		8,790	
Reform win (new seat)			
Reform win (new seat)			
Reform win (new seat)			

=== Park ===
Park
Party	Candidate	Votes	%
Independent	Osman Khalil	1,588	46.5
Labour	Mohammed Shazad Fazal*	1,016	29.8
Workers Party	Shakir Saghir*	901	26.4
Independent	Nagheena Haroon	632	18.5
Workers Party	Sohail Ashfaq	601	17.6
Liberal Democrats	Abdul Rehman	592	17.4
Green	Fintan Daly	496	14.5
Green	Charles Gate	426	12.5
Green	Diccon Lowe	399	11.7
Labour	Michael Darby	398	11.7
Labour	Megan Taylor	380	11.1
Reform	Ruth Heslop	217	6.4
Reform	Toby Rogan	210	6.2
Reform	Sandeep Goyal	192	5.6
Liberal Democrats	Mark Pittaway	138	4.0
Conservative	Stephen Townend	112	3.3
Rejected ballots		21	0.6
Turnout		3,433	39.6
Registered electors		8,663	
Independent win (new seat)			
Labour win (new seat)			
Workers Party win (new seat)			

=== Rastrick ===
Rastrick
Party	Candidate	Votes	%
Reform	Simon Briggs	1,644	40.3
Reform	David Small	1,551	38.0
Reform	Jackie Wilson	1,523	37.3
Conservative	Regan Dickenson*	966	23.7
Conservative	Chris Pillai*	960	23.5
Conservative	Mark Holmes	899	22.0
Labour	Peter Judge*	822	20.2
Labour	Katy Shannon	674	16.5
Labour	Tony Rimmer	668	16.4
Green	Andrew Bramley	658	16.1
Green	Vic Tordoff	549	13.5
Green	Teddy Morgan	540	13.2
Liberal Democrats	Andrew Menzies	195	4.8
Liberal Democrats	Margareta Holmstedt	173	4.2
Rejected ballots		6	0.1
Turnout		4,084	43.4
Registered electors		9,411	
Reform win (new seat)			
Reform win (new seat)			
Reform win (new seat)			

=== Ryburn ===
Ryburn
Party	Candidate	Votes	%
Independent	Leah Webster*	1,579	37.1
Reform	Alex Greenwood	1,423	33.4
Reform	Christopher Green	1,374	32.3
Reform	Steven Jowett	1,291	30.3
Conservative	Robert Thornber	895	21.0
Liberal Democrats	Michael Holdsworth	573	13.5
Conservative	Anne Benton	557	13.1
Conservative	Julia Cockroft	553	13.0
Labour	Marie Wright	495	11.6
Green	Sian Fisher	493	11.6
Labour	Keith Butterick	488	11.5
Green	Tabitha Peacock	477	11.2
Labour	Peter Ehrhardt	440	10.3
Green	Cordelia Prescott	364	8.6
Liberal Democrats	Linda Levick	344	8.1
Liberal Democrats	David Mitchell	316	7.4
Rejected ballots		8	0.2
Turnout		4,263	52.0
Registered electors		8,197	
Independent win (new seat)			
Reform win (new seat)			
Reform win (new seat)			

=== Salterhebble, Southowram & Skircoat Green ===
Salterhebble, Southowram & Skircoat Green
Party	Candidate	Votes	%
Reform	Paul Hawkaluk*	1,858	47.3
Reform	Stephen Padgett	1,854	47.2
Reform	Mederic Payne	1,704	43.4
Labour	Don Bishop	912	23.2
Labour	Yolande Shire	878	22.4
Labour	Phil Shire	823	21.0
Green	Catherine Frost	695	17.7
Green	Tommy Fielden	608	15.5
Conservative	Judith Sugden	594	15.1
Green	Gary Scott	566	14.4
Liberal Democrats	Joanne O'Hanlon	384	9.8
Rejected ballots		13	0.3
Turnout		3,939	44.9
Registered electors		8,765	
Reform win (new seat)			
Reform win (new seat)			
Reform win (new seat)			

=== Sowerby Bridge ===
Sowerby Bridge
Party	Candidate	Votes	%
Reform	Andrew Varley	1,637	38.8
Reform	Mike Payne	1,587	37.7
Labour	Adam Wilkinson*	1,574	37.4
Reform	Nigel Marklew	1,549	36.8
Labour	Dot Foster*	1,453	34.5
Labour	Simon Ashton*	1,441	34.2
Green	Daniel Murgatroyd	538	12.8
Green	Brigid Featherstone	535	12.7
Green	David Booth	514	12.2
Conservative	John Vaughan	413	9.8
Liberal Democrats	Michelle Turner	276	6.5
Monster Raving Loony	Captain Loogie	246	5.8
Independent	Simon Zonenblick	123	2.9
Rejected ballots		11	0.3
Turnout		4,225	45.5
Registered electors		9,289	
Reform win (new seat)			
Reform win (new seat)			
Labour win (new seat)			

=== Todmorden West ===
Todmorden West
Party	Candidate	Votes	%
Green	Jamie Furlong	1,718	38.2
Green	Sarah Goodfellow	1,686	37.5
Green	Oscar Seville-Leach	1,458	32.4
Labour Co-op	Tyler Hanley	1,395	31.0
Labour Co-op	Diana Tremayne*	1,393	31.0
Labour Co-op	Silvia Dacre*	1,300	28.9
Reform	Deborah Garnett	1,074	23.9
Reform	John Pendlebury	1,070	23.8
Reform	Julie Wood	1,050	23.4
Conservative	Peter Chapman	281	6.3
Conservative	Alan Benton	273	6.1
Liberal Democrats	Nikki Stocks	266	5.9
Conservative	Stephen Ross	238	5.3
Rejected ballots		15	0.3
Turnout		4,511	49.1
Registered electors		9,190	
Green win (new seat)			
Green win (new seat)			
Green win (new seat)			

=== Wainhouse ===
Wainhouse
Party	Candidate	Votes	%
Labour	Ann Kingstone*	1,287	31.8
Labour	Dave Mendes da Costa	1,232	30.4
Reform	Cathy Featherstone	1,215	30.0
Reform	Jeff Featherstone	1,198	29.6
Reform	Sireesha Betha	1,133	28.0
Labour	Gary Rae	1,102	27.2
Green	Gillian Manojlovic	1,075	26.6
Green	Rachele Pipe	1,017	25.1
Green	Ian Pepper	1,008	24.9
Conservative	Ben Andrews	587	14.5
Liberal Democrats	Stephen Gow	337	8.3
Liberal Democrats	Katie Jackson	306	7.6
Rejected ballots		8	0.2
Turnout		4,055	49.0
Registered electors		8,281	
Labour win (new seat)			
Labour win (new seat)			
Reform win (new seat)			

=== Warley ===
Warley
Party	Candidate	Votes	%
Liberal Democrats	Ashley Evans*	1,166	36.9
Reform	Irena Corkish	924	29.2
Liberal Democrats	Chris Wadsworth	920	29.1
Liberal Democrats	Sam Myatt	893	28.3
Reform	Christian Corkish	872	27.6
Reform	Gill Tolley	843	26.7
Labour	Mark Durrans	484	15.3
Green	Katie Witham	451	14.3
Green	Asha Hinterland	450	14.2
Labour	Anne Pitcher	444	14.0
Green	Samuel Lionheart	402	12.7
Labour	Jane Pugh	400	12.7
Workers Party	Esain Saddique	311	9.8
Conservative	Stephen Baines	246	7.8
Rejected ballots		10	0.3
Turnout		3,171	38.2
Registered electors		8,307	
Liberal Democrats win (new seat)			
Reform win (new seat)			
Liberal Democrats win (new seat)			
