= Gazanging =

Term used in property transaction

Gazanging is a term used in the UK to describe when a vendor pulls out of a property transaction and opts to stay put, having previously accepted an offer.

Frequently, this occurs due to a change in circumstances, such that the seller no longer wishes to move, or are unable to. It has also been linked to a slowdown in housing market activity, which leads to an under-supply of property, giving the vendor less choice of properties to move to. The original buyer is left 'hanging'; hence the word gazanging, intended to echo the commonplace term gazumping.

The term "gazanging" was originally coined by online conveyancing service In-Deed, following research among home buyers published in September 2011.

After the 2008 financial crisis, the British residential property market became increasingly uncertain. In contrast to Scotland and the United States, the England and Wales property market's volatility stems from the fact that a seller's acceptance of the buyer's offer is not legally binding until contracts are exchanged. This is a result of the Law of Property (Miscellaneous Provisions) Act 1989 s.2, requiring that a contract for the sale of land must be in writing. This precept of English law dates back to the Statute of Frauds of 1677, and is intended to prevent dishonesty.

It can take as long as 3 months from acceptance of the offer for the conveyancing to be completed, during which time the property market could increase in value sufficiently that the seller believes they could get a better price by pulling out and listing their property again, gazanging the buyer.

== Gazumping and gazundering ==
Gazumping and gazundering are related phenomena, describing specific cases where either the seller raises the price, or the buyer lowers their offer. In contrast, gazanging is not intended to improve either party's position to achieve a better deal. Instead, the seller pulls out of the sale entirely, leaving the buyer with no recourse whatsoever.
