= Gazumping =

UK term regarding accepting an offer, then a higher offer for real estate

Gazumping occurs when a seller (especially of property) accepts a verbal offer (a promise to purchase) on the property from one potential buyer, but then accepts a higher offer from someone else. This can happen at any point before the sale is legally finalised. It can also refer to the seller raising the asking price or asking for more money at the last minute, after previously verbally agreeing to a lower one. In either case, the original buyer is left in a bad situation, and either has to offer a higher price or lose the purchase. The term gazumping is most commonly used in the United Kingdom and Ireland, although similar practices can be found in some other jurisdictions such as Australia.

== England and Wales ==
With buoyant property prices in the British residential property market of the late 1980s, gazumping became commonplace in England and Wales, because a buyer's offer is not legally binding even after acceptance of the offer by the vendor. A contract for the sale of land must be in writing, a requirement of English law that dates back to the Statute of Frauds of 1677 and is restated by s.2 of the Law of Property (Miscellaneous Provisions) Act 1989. This requirement was originally intended to promote good faith and certainty in land transactions and to prevent dishonesty.

When the owner accepts the offer on a property, the buyer will usually not yet have commissioned a building survey nor will the buyer have yet had the opportunity to perform recommended legal checks. The offer to purchase is made "subject to contract" and thus, until written contracts are exchanged, either party can pull out at any time. It can take as long as 10–12 weeks for formalities to be completed, and if the seller is tempted by a higher offer during this period, it leaves the buyer disappointed and out-of-pocket. Asking price has no impact on whether a property will be "gazumped", but location does: it is more common in London and the North East. Accepting any offer over a previous offer is known as gazumping.

When property prices are in decline, the practice of gazumping becomes rare. The term 'gazundering' has been coined for the opposite practice, whereby the buyer waits until everybody is poised to exchange contracts before lowering the offer on the property, threatening the collapse of a whole chain of house sales waiting for the deal to go through. 'Gazanging' describes a similar situation, wherein a seller pulls out of a sale entirely, expecting to get a better asking price or offer once the market improves.

The term may be derived from the Yiddish word 'gezumph', meaning to overcharge or cheat.

== Scotland ==
Scots law and practice makes the problem of gazumping a rarity in Scotland. In the Scottish system of conveyancing, buyers either obtain a survey prior to making a bid to the seller's solicitor or make an offer "subject to survey". Sellers normally set a closing date for written offers, then provide written acceptance of the chosen bid. The agreement becomes binding when a seller's solicitor delivers a signed written acceptance of a buyer's offer. Should the seller attempt to accept a higher bid after the contracts have been legally finalised by a written offer and acceptance, their solicitor will refuse to act for them, as this, according to the Law Society of Scotland code of practice, would be professional misconduct. As in England, all contracts for the sale of land must be evidenced in writing, signed by or on behalf of each party. In Scotland, the parties' solicitors sign on their behalf, unlike in England, where buyer and seller both sign a contract which has been produced in duplicate form, with the duplicates then being exchanged to effect a binding contract. It is often wrongly claimed that gazumping is a rarity in Scotland because it is said that an oral agreement on a property deal is legally binding; while the law on contract differs from the law in England, the rarity is due to the different system of conveyancing.

In Scotland, however, an estate agent, acting on behalf of the seller, can initiate instances of another form of gazumping. Once a closing date for written offers has been reached and an estate agent has given an oral acceptance of the chosen bid, the estate agent can then attempt to induce a bidding war between the successful buyer and a rival, who may be fictional, in an attempt to increase the offer made by each party. In such circumstance, there is little recourse for a successful buyer who, despite having been informed orally that their offer has been accepted, is then informed orally that their offer has been rejected in favour of a higher bid. Such situations only occur at an early stage of the conveyancing process, prior to any written acceptance of an offer being given by the seller's solicitor. Often they result from the legal requirement on the part of estate agents to advise a seller of any higher offer received prior to written confirmation of an orally accepted offer being given, including those received after a closing date.

In Scotland, gazundering is possible where the buyer has insufficient assets to be worth suing, but is not common.

== Australia ==
Gazumping is not illegal in Australia. The rules will differ between the various States and territories of Australia; however, the Northern Territory Government defines gazumping as "when a seller verbally accepts a price from you, but then signs a contract with another person to sell the property for a higher price"

The NT Government notes there is little that can be done if a buyer is gazumped and that the gazumped potential buyer will still have to pay costs for services already done to buy the property.

These could include any of the following:

- legal advice
- conveyancing services
- inspection reports
- finance application costs.

However, if you paid a deposit for a potential house purchase in the Northern Territory and were gazumped, that deposit must be refunded in full.

The same source also offers advice on how a potential buyer could protect themselves from being gazumped. Neil Jenman also provides advice on gazumping in Australian house purchasing.

== United States ==
The term gazumping is not used in the United States as once a house sale and price are agreed verbally it is binding in law. Every state has different laws and traditions, but buyers typically make a written offer that, when accepted (signed) by the seller, is in most localities binding on the seller. This is known as a "purchase and sale" contract, which may have conditions. U.S. residential purchase contracts typically contain an inspection clause, a short period during which the buyer can inspect the property and back out of the contract with the full return of the earnest money, if the property does not pass the buyer's inspections. The seller, however, cannot, except in some states, back out during the inspection period. New Jersey is one state where the seller has a "legal review" period, during which they can back out of an accepted contract.

== Gazundering ==
"Gazundering" is where a prospective buyer (especially of a property) offers to buy the property at an agreed price but subsequently threatens to withdraw the offer unless the seller agrees to a lower price. If the seller does not agree with the change in price, the deal may fall through. Gazundering became widespread in the 1980s due to the decade's housing market deregulation, skyrocketing house prices and buyers having a legal advantage over sellers. There are two circumstances where this happens:

- In a falling market, where the value of the property has fallen significantly in the period between the initial agreement and the expected sale date.
- Just before formal contracts are signed, when the buyer believes the seller is in a weak position (a practice generally perceived as unethical). The seller could be in a weak position, having entered into other commitments such as a chain and would be very reluctant to pull out.

== See also ==
- Re-trade
