= Home tour event =

Industry showcase of homes in the U.S.

A home tour event or housing show, sometimes branded as Parade of Homes, Street of Dreams, Tour of Homes or Homearama, is a building industry showcase of homes, typically new builds, held in several regions throughout the United States. The events date to the late 1940s.

== Background ==
In the years following World War II, the United States experienced housing shortages. Builders entered the market to create mass housing developments such as Levittown; by 1952, such builders had produced six million new housing units. The market for starter homes was saturated, and builders needed to create a new market for move-up homes that had additional space and included more upscale features. According to House & Home magazine, the building boom meant builders had "in a very literal sense...built themselves out of their easy market" and said "from now on they must sell their new houses to people already well-housed -- at least by yesterday's standards". According to the Washington Post in 1953, home builders were being confronted for the first time since before the war with a buyer's market.

Aspirational standards of living increased as Americans were exposed to bigger homes via movies, television, and advertising; by the mid-1950s 18 million families were financially able to consider moving from starter homes to move-up homes. In general the period was one of increased consumer spending.

== History ==
The date of the first of such events is disputed. According to the National Association of Home Builders (NABH), the Salt Lake Home Builders Association held the first Parade of Homes in the United States in 1946. According to Samuel Dodd, writing in the Journal of Design History, the first housing show was organized in 1948 by the NABH under the brand Parade of Homes. The nation's first home-tour organization was established in Minnesota in 1948 by the Builders Association of the Twin Cities (now known as Housing First Minnesota).

Early events featured crowd-drawing publicity stunts such as beauty contests and other sexualized components; a Hartford, Connecticut show featured a "girl in a bathtub" promotion -- a female employee sitting in a bathtub answering questions. Other publicity stunts included a 1956 Kansas City show that featured a team assembling and furnishing a prefabricated home in eight hours.

According to Dodd, by the mid-1950s such shows had become "the highlight of the annual homebuilding economy".

== Events ==
Housing shows use a model home merchandising strategy to turn show attendees into buyers by staging the houses to allow attendees to picture themselves in the space. Beatrice West was a prominent designer and stager in the 1950s.

Some cold war era events featured homes with a bomb shelter.

In some locales, the events are presented by the local Home Builders Association or Building Industry Association. The events showcase homes, both new construction and remodeled homes. Homes generally include single-family homes, condominiums, duplexes, and/or townhomes. Sometimes entire new developments or streets within existing developments are developed for such events. Sometimes event homes are located in multiple neighborhoods in a city.

The Parade of Homes presented by Housing First Minnesota is the largest housing show in the nation. The event runs twice a year, once in the spring and once in the fall, with participation peaking at 1,259 home entries in a single event in 2006. The first United States Trademark for "Parade of Homes" was registered by the Home Builders Association of Fort Wayne, Inc. and was transferred to Housing First Minnesota in 2010.

The Portland metropolitan area of Oregon Home Builders Association event features high-end homes designed to showcase new designs and amenities. Started in 1976, a previous incarnation of the event was known as the Parade of Homes and later as Street of Dreams.

Some events allow tours for free; others require an admission ticket to view the homes. Some events offer awards in various categories. Some events feature remodeled homes.
