= Chain (real estate) =

Sequence of house-buying transactions

A chain, when used in reference to the process of buying or selling a house, is a sequence of linked house purchases, each of which is dependent on the preceding and succeeding purchase. The term is commonly used in the UK. It is an example of a vacancy chain.

Each member of the chain is a house sale, which depends both upon the buyers receiving the money from selling their houses and on the sellers successfully buying the houses that they intend to move into. Where no chain exists, it is called a chain-free property but only 10% of property transactions in the United Kingdom have no chain.

For example, in a four-household chain, A buys B's house, B uses the money from that sale to buy C's house, and C uses the money from that sale to buy D's house. (A chain can be circular. This example becomes circular if D buys A's house.

This situation is notorious for being liable to "break" if one of the transactions fails, for example due to financial difficulties, a change of heart, or the practice of gazumping or gazundering. The failure of one member of the chain fouls the whole set of transactions. The remaining chain fragments must find new buyers and sellers. In 2025 it was estimated that half a million British house sales fell through because of this.

A chain begins with a household buying a house without selling their current house. Examples:

- A household that does not currently own a house. This may be a first time buyer, such as a household moving out of rented accommodation. It may also be the result of a household splitting, for example a grown child leaving home.
- A household retaining ownership of their old house after moving out. For example, they may wish to rent it out, demolish it, or merely leave it vacant and keep it on the market.

A chain ends with a house being sold and not depending on existing owners buying a house to move into. Examples:

- A household moving into a vacant house. It may be a newly built house or a house rendered vacant due to the death of its occupant or occupants or the departure of former tenants.
- A household moving to join an existing household.
- A household moving to temporary accommodation until they can buy a new house.
- A household moving into rented accommodation or a nursing home.

== See also ==
- Estate agent
