= 2012 Calderdale Metropolitan Borough Council election =

2012 UK local government election

- 3 May 2012

17 of 51 seats on Calderdale Metropolitan Borough Council 26 seats needed for a majority

	First party	Second party	Third party
Leader	Tim Swift
Party	Labour	Conservative	Liberal Democrats
Leader's seat	Town
Seats before	13	21	13
Seats won	9	5	3
Seats after	20	17	12
Seat change	▲7	▼4	▼1
Leader before election
Janet Battye
Liberal Democrat (UK)
Leader after election
Tim Swift
Labour

2012 local election results in Calderdale

== Background ==
The Local Government Act 1972 created a two-tier system of metropolitan counties and districts covering Greater Manchester, Merseyside, South Yorkshire, Tyne and Wear, the West Midlands, and West Yorkshire starting in 1974. Calderdale was a district of the West Yorkshire metropolitan county. The Local Government Act 1985 abolished the metropolitan counties, with metropolitan districts taking on most of their powers as metropolitan boroughs. The West Yorkshire Combined Authority was established in 2014 and began electing the mayor of West Yorkshire in 2021.

Calderdale Council was under no overall control with Conservative, Liberal Democrat and Labour leaders until the Labour Party achieved a majority of seats in the 2019 election, when they gained four seats to hold 28 of the council's 51 seats. In the most recent election in 2022, seventeen seats were up for election. Labour won eleven seats, the Conservatives won 4 seats, and the Liberal Democrats and Greens both won one seat.

Positions up for election in 2023 were last elected in 2019. In that election, Labour won ten seats, the Conservatives won four, the Liberal Democrats won two and independent candidates won one seat.

== Electoral process ==
The council elects its councillors in thirds, with a third being up for election for three consecutive years and no election in the fourth year. The election used first-past-the-post voting, with wards generally being represented by three councillors, with one elected in each election year to serve a four-year term.

All registered electors (British, Irish, Commonwealth and European Union citizens) living in Calderdale aged 18 or over were entitled to vote in the election. People who live at two addresses in different councils, such as university students with different term-time and holiday addresses, are entitled to be registered for and vote in elections in both local authorities. Voting in-person at polling stations took place from 07:00 to 22:00 on election day, and voters were able to apply for postal votes or proxy votes in advance of the election.

== Council results ==
Party	Councillors				Votes		
Party		Of total	Net			Of total	Net
Labour	10	58.8%	0	10 / 17	22,904	44.1%	-1.1%
Conservative	4	23.5%	0	4 / 17	15,208	29.3%	-3.4%
Liberal Democrats	2	11.8%	0	2 / 17	6,570	12.6%	+0.8%
Green	1	5.9%	+1	1 / 17	6,291	12.1%	+3.0%
Freedom Alliance	0	0.0%	0	0 / 17	366	0.7%	+0.5%
Independent	0	0.0%	-1	0 / 17	288	0.6%	+0.4%

The 2012 Calderdale Metropolitan Borough Council election took place on 3 May 2012 to elect members of Calderdale Metropolitan Borough Council in West Yorkshire, England. This was on the same day as other 2012 United Kingdom local elections. After the election the council continued to have no overall control and continue to be run by a coalition between the Labour Party and the Liberal Democrats.

The Warley Councillor Keith Hutson stepped down in 2012 for health reasons. A by-election was held on 19 July 2012. The seat was held by the Liberal Democrats with James Baker winning the seat.

In this year Councillor Nader Fekri for Calder ward defected to Labour from the Liberal Democrats in 2012 saying that he could no longer support the coalition in the national parliament with the Conservatives.

In April 2013 the coalition between Labour and the Liberal Democrats collapsed as Labour pulled out over disagreements over benefit cuts. Labour continued to run the council as a minority administration.

== Council composition ==
Prior to the election the composition of the council was:

↓
13	21	13	1	3
Labour	Conservative	Lib Dem	ILD	Ind

After the election the composition of the council was:

↓
20	17	12	2
Labour	Conservative	Lib Dem	Ind

Party	Previous council	New council
Labour	13	20
Conservative	21	17
Liberal Democrats	13	12
Independent	3	2
Ind. Lib Dem	1	0
Total	51	51

== Ward results ==
=== Brighouse ward ===
Brighouse
Party	Candidate	Votes	%	±%
Labour	Ann Martin	1,329	47.1	+25.1
Conservative	Howard Blagbrough	1,195	42.3	+2.1
Liberal Democrats	Jennie Rigg	273	9.8	−28.0
Majority		134	4.7	
Turnout		2,822	32.7	−6.4
Labour gain from Conservative		Swing		

The incumbent was Howard Blagbrough for the Conservative Party.

=== Calder ward ===
Calder
Party	Candidate	Votes	%	±%
Liberal Democrats	Janet Battye	1,599	39.1	+7.0
Labour	Susan Press	1,454	35.5	+4.8
Green	Kate Sweeny	541	13.2	−10.9
Conservative	Gail Lund	477	11.7	−1.4
Majority		145	3.5	
Turnout		4,093	44.9	+3.4
Liberal Democrats hold		Swing		

The incumbent was Janet Battye for the Liberal Democrats.

=== Elland ward ===
Elland
Party	Candidate	Votes	%	±%
Liberal Democrats	Pat Allen	950	36.4	−7.6
Labour	Angi Gallagher	829	31.8	+20.4
Conservative	Mike Payne	595	22.8	−6.4
Green	Susan Thomas	225	8.6	+3.1
Majority		121	4.6	
Turnout		2,607	30.9	−2.5
Liberal Democrats hold		Swing		

The incumbent was Pat Allen for the Liberal Democrats.

=== Greetland & Stainland ward ===
Greetland & Stainland
Party	Candidate	Votes	%	±%
Liberal Democrats	Malcolm James	1,121	41.4	−4.3
Conservative	Keith Watson	751	27.8	−3.4
Labour	Jim Gallagher	527	19.5	+11.3
Green	Mark Mullany	297	11.0	+5.4
Majority		370	13.7	
Turnout		2,705	31.9	−4.79
Liberal Democrats gain from Conservative		Swing		

The incumbent was Keith Watson for the Conservative Party.

=== Hipperholme & Lightcliffe ward ===
Hipperholme & Lightcliffe
Party	Candidate	Votes	%	±%
Conservative	Graham Hall	1,322	42.8	−25.7
Independent	Chris O'Connor	930	30.1	N/A
Labour	Anthony Rutherford	722	25.4	+9.8
Liberal Democrats	Mat Bowles	106	3.4	−14.5
Majority		392	12.7	
Turnout		3,090	35.3	−3.1
Conservative hold		Swing		

The incumbent was Graham Hall for the Conservative Party.

=== Illingworth & Mixenden ward ===
Illingworth & Mixenden
Party	Candidate	Votes	%	±%
Labour	Lisa Lambert	1,224	40.8	+11.4
Independent	Tom Bates	968	32.3	−6.1
Conservative	Andrew Tagg	673	22.4	−0.6
Independent	Sean Loftus	76	2.5	−1.1
Liberal Democrats	Glen Mattock	50	1.7	−3.9
Majority		256	8.5	
Turnout		2,998	32.7	−4.4
Labour gain from Independent		Swing		

The incumbent was Tom Bates, an independent.

=== Luddendenfoot ward ===
Luddendenfoot
Party	Candidate	Votes	%	±%
Labour	Simon Young	1,263	41.3	+25.0
Liberal Democrats	Christine Bampton-Smith	948	31.0	−10.4
Conservative	Gillian Smith-Moorhouse	823	26.9	−5.4
Majority		315	10.3	
Turnout		3,060	37.9	−3.1
Labour gain from Liberal Democrats		Swing		

The incumbent was Christine Bampton-Smith for the Liberal Democrats.

=== Northowram & Shelf ward ===
Northowram & Shelf
Party	Candidate	Votes	%	±%
Conservative	Peter Caffrey	1,705	56.6	+7.6
Labour	Gary Walsh	1,094	36.3	+21.6
Liberal Democrats	Kenneth Albret	181	6.0	−0.7
Majority		611	20.3	
Turnout		3,014	33.1	−7.0
Conservative hold		Swing		

The incumbent was Graham Hall for the Conservative Party.

=== Ovenden ward ===
Ovenden
Party	Candidate	Votes	%	±%
Labour	Anne Collins	1,255	68.1	+23.3
Conservative	Christopher Blakey	367	19.9	−5.4
Liberal Democrats	John Reynolds	186	10.1	−3.0
Majority		888	43.2	
Turnout		1,843	21.8	−3.6
Labour hold		Swing		

The incumbent was Danielle Coombs for the Labour Party.

=== Park ward ===
Park
Party	Candidate	Votes	%	±%
Labour	Jenny Lynn	2,657	63.6	+25.9
Conservative	Shakir Saghir	838	20.1	+9.1
Liberal Democrats	Mohammad Ilyas	651	15.6	−25.7
Majority		1,819	43.6	
Turnout		4,176	46.1	−4.8
Labour gain from Liberal Democrats		Swing		

The incumbent was Mohammad Ilyas for the Liberal Democrats.

=== Rastrick ward ===
Rastrick
Party	Candidate	Votes	%	±%
Conservative	Ann McAllister	1,311	49.8	+0.8
Labour	Peter Judge	1,046	39.8	+18.6
TUSC	Rob Bailey	258	9.8	N/A
Majority		265	10.1	
Turnout		2,631	30.6	−6.5
Conservative hold		Swing		

The incumbent was Ann McAllister for the Conservative Party.

=== Ryburn ward ===
Ryburn
Party	Candidate	Votes	%	±%
Conservative	Geraldine Carter	1,253	44.9	−9.3
Labour	Judy Gannon	944	33.8	+17.5
Green	Freda Davis	349	12.5	N/A
Liberal Democrats	Rosemary Tatchell	229	8.2	−21.3
Majority		309	11.1	
Turnout		2,790	31.6	−4.4
Conservative hold		Swing		

The incumbent was Geraldine Carter for the Conservative Party.

=== Skircoat ward ===
Skircoat
Party	Candidate	Votes	%	±%
Conservative	John Hardy	1,496	41.0	−13.0
Liberal Democrats	Stephen Gow	1,104	30.3	−2.8
Labour	Alistair Millington	778	21.3	+13.5
Green	Charles Gate	251	6.9	+1.8
Majority		392	10.7	
Turnout		3,647	38.4	−3.8
Conservative hold		Swing		

The incumbent was John Hardy for the Conservative Party.

=== Sowerby Bridge ward ===
Sowerby Bridge
Party	Candidate	Votes	%	±%
Labour	Adam Wilkinson	1,422	52.5	+23.1
Conservative	Andrew Feather	915	38.8	−8.8
Liberal Democrats	Elizabeth Ward	330	12.2	−0.2
Majority		507	18.7	
Turnout		2,709	32.0	−3.7
Labour gain from Conservative		Swing		

The incumbent was Amanda Byrne for the Conservative Party.

=== Todmorden ward ===
Todmorden
Party	Candidate	Votes	%	±%
Labour	Steve Sweeney	1,072	35.2	+8.7
Liberal Democrats	Olwen Jennings	874	28.7	+0.4
Conservative	Ian Cooper	583	19.1	−13.4
BPP	David Jones	257	8.4	N/A
Green	John Nesbitt	246	8.1	N/A
Majority		198	6.5	
Turnout		3,045	34.3	−3.7
Labour gain from Conservative		Swing		

The incumbent was Ian Cooper for the Conservative Party.

=== Town ward ===
Town
Party	Candidate	Votes	%	±%
Labour	Megan Swift	1,389	63.0	+23.5
Conservative	Stephen Collins	576	26.1	+1.8
Liberal Democrats	Ruth Coleman-Taylor	206	9.3	−0.9
Majority		2,205	25.2	
Turnout		2,205	25.2	−5.9
Labour hold		Swing		

The incumbent was Megan Swift for the Labour Party.

=== Warley ward ===
Warley
Party	Candidate	Votes	%	±%
Labour	Martin Burton	1,259	40.8	+27.8
Liberal Democrats	James Baker	1,146	37.1	−14.7
Conservative	Christopher Pearson	658	21.3	−0.5
Majority		113	3.7	
Turnout		3,089	35.5	−2.6
Labour gain from Ind. Lib Dem		Swing		

The incumbent was Robert Pearson, an independent Liberal Democrat.

== By-elections between 2012 and 2014 ==
=== Warley ward, 2012 ===
Warley By-Election 19 July 2012
Party	Candidate	Votes	%	±%
Liberal Democrats	James Douglas Baker	1,066	41.56	
Labour	Jonathan Charles Timbers	896	34.93	
Conservative	Christopher James Pearson	454	17.70	
Green	Charles Gate	140	5.46	
Majority		170	6.63	
Turnout		2,565	29.06	
Liberal Democrats hold		Swing		
