= 2010 Calderdale Metropolitan Borough Council election =

2010 UK local government election

- 6 May 2010

17 of 51 seats on Calderdale Metropolitan Borough Council 26 seats needed for a majority

	First party	Second party	Third party
Party	Conservative	Liberal Democrats	Labour
Leader's seat			Town
Seats before	21	15	9
Seats won	4	7	4
Seats after	20	17	10
Seat change	▼1	▲2	▲1
Popular vote	30,275	27,893	24,898
Percentage	31.99%	17.9%	26.31%
Leader before election
Stephen Baines
Conservative
Leader after election
Janet Battye
Liberal Democrat/Labour Coalition

2010 local election results in Calderdale

The 2010 Calderdale Metropolitan Borough Council election took place on 6 May 2010 to elect members of Calderdale Metropolitan Borough Council in England. This was on the same day as other local elections and a general election. One councillor was elected in each ward for a four-year term so the councillors elected in 2010 last stood for election in 2006. Each ward is represented by three councillors, the election of which is staggered, so only one third of the councillors was elected in this election. After the election the council stayed in no overall control but the Conservative minority administration was replaced with a coalition between Labour and the Liberal Democrats.

Brighouse Councillor Joyce Cawthra left the Conservative Party and became an Independent in December 2010 due to her not being selected by the party to stand in the next election.

== Council result ==
2010 Calderdale Metropolitan Borough Council election
Party	Candidates						Votes		
Party	Stood	Elected	Gained	Unseated	Net	% of total	%	No.	Net %
Conservative	17	4	1	2	▼1	23.53	31.99	30,275	
Liberal Democrats	17	7	2	0	▲2	41.18	29.48	27,893	
Labour	17	4	1	0	▲1	23.53	26.31	24,898	
Independent	5	2	0	0	0	11.76	4.93	4,661	
BNP	6	0	0	1	▼1	0.00	4.33	4,100	
Green	7	0	0	0	0	0.00	2.66	2,520	
BPP	1	0	0	0	0	0.00	0.30	283	

== Council composition ==
Prior to the election the composition of the council was:

↓
21	15	9	3	2	1
Conservative	Lib Dem	Labour	Ind	BN	ED

After the election the composition of the council was:

↓
20	17	10	3	1
Conservative	Lib Dem	Labour	Ind	BN

Party	Previous council	New council
Conservative	21	20
Liberal Democrats	15	17
Labour	9	10
Independent	3	3
BNP	2	1
English Democrat	1	0
Total	51	51

== Ward results ==
=== Brighouse ward ===
Brighouse
Party	Candidate	Votes	%	±%
Independent	Colin Stout	1,935	34.5	−10.0
Conservative	Kris Pillai	1,317	23.5	−6.5
Liberal Democrats	Nick Yates	1,270	22.6	+14.7
Labour	Pamela Margaret Fellows	1,086	19.4	+1.8
Majority				
Turnout		5,641	66.11	
Independent hold		Swing		

The incumbent was Colin Stout as an Independent.

=== Calder ward ===
Calder
Party	Candidate	Votes	%	±%
Liberal Democrats	Nader Fekri	2,775	41.7	+7.6
Conservative	Gail Lund	1,575	23.7	+4.1
Labour	Robin Dixon	1,538	23.1	−1.5
Green	Alan Patrick McDonald	762	11.5	−10.2
Majority				
Turnout		6,694	72.90	
Liberal Democrats hold		Swing		

The incumbent was Nader Fekri for the Liberal Democrats.

=== Elland ward ===
Elland
Party	Candidate	Votes	%	±%
Liberal Democrats	David Hardy	2,069	41.0	−12.7
Conservative	Christian Corkish	1,534	30.4	−0.3
Labour	Angie Gallagher	1,227	24.3	+8.7
Green	Susan Ann Thomas	211	4.2	+4.2
Majority				
Turnout		5,087	59.34	
Liberal Democrats hold		Swing		

The incumbent was Robert Thompson for the Liberal Democrats who stood down at this election.

=== Greetland and Stainland ward ===
Greetland and Stainland
Party	Candidate	Votes	%	±%
Liberal Democrats	Conrad Vero Winterburn	2,551	45.9	−5.4
Conservative	Beverley Anne Carter	1,854	33.3	+5.2
Labour	James Gallagher	893	16.1	+3.8
Green	Mark Richard Mullany	262	4.7	−3.6
Majority				
Turnout		5,599	66.47	
Liberal Democrats hold		Swing		

The incumbent was Conrad Winterbottom for the Liberal Democrats.

=== Hipperholme and Lightcliffe ward ===
Hipperholme and Lightcliffe
Party	Candidate	Votes	%	±%
Independent	Colin Raistrick	2,213	37.0	−2.6
Conservative	John Frank Brearley Ford	1,971	33.0	−4.7
Labour	Sean Patrick O'Malley	933	15.6	+0.1
Liberal Democrats	Jennie Dawn Rigg	860	14.4	+7.2
Majority				
Turnout		6,022	69.48	
Independent hold		Swing		

The incumbent was Colin Raistrick as an Independent.

=== Illingworth and Mixenden ward ===
Illingworth and Mixenden
Party	Candidate	Votes	%	±%
Labour	Daniel James Sutherland	1,995	36.7	+8.9
Conservative	Andrew James Tagg	1,403	25.8	+3.2
BNP	Richard Mulhall	1,226	22.5	−13.1
Liberal Democrats	Philip Anthony Walters	701	12.9	+3.1
Independent	Sean Vincent Loftus	114	2.1	−2.0
Majority				
Turnout		5,470	58.20	
Labour gain from BNP		Swing		

The incumbent was Geoffrey Wallace for the BNP who stood down at this election.

=== Luddendenfoot ward ===
Luddendenfoot
Party	Candidate	Votes	%	±%
Liberal Democrats	John Christopher Beacroft-Mitchell	2,138	38.8	+3.9
Conservative	Sarah Jane Jennings	1,626	29.5	−0.7
Labour	Lesley Anne Sleigh	1,036	18.8	+2.2
BNP	John Derek Gregory	398	7.2	−11.2
Green	Jennifer Byrom	315	5.7	+5.7
Majority				
Turnout		5,532	70.21	
Liberal Democrats hold		Swing		

The incumbent was Peter Coles for the Liberal Democrats who stood down at this election.

=== Northowram and Shelf ward ===
Northowram and Shelf
Party	Candidate	Votes	%	±%
Conservative	Stephen Baines	3,281	52.2	+7.4
Labour	Martin Burton	1,301	20.7	−0.6
Liberal Democrats	Elizabeth Margaret Ward	1,183	18.8	+8.0
BNP	Ann Jackson	521	8.3	−14.8
Majority				
Turnout		6,360	70.12	
Conservative hold		Swing		

The incumbent was Stephen Baines for the Conservative Party.

=== Ovenden ward ===
Ovenden
Party	Candidate	Votes	%	±%
Labour	Helen Josephine Rivron	1,887	45.4	+5.6
Conservative	Peter Caffrey	860	20.7	+7.3
BNP	Jane Shooter	727	17.5	−15.2
Liberal Democrats	Kathleen Haigh-Hutchinson	680	16.4	+4.4
Majority				
Turnout		4,169	49.28	
Labour hold		Swing		

The incumbent was Helen Rivron for the Labour Party.

=== Park ward ===
Park
Party	Candidate	Votes	%	±%
Labour	Ferman Ali	2,381	43.8	+8.2
Liberal Democrats	Mohammed Shazad Fazal	1,856	34.2	+8.4
Conservative	Mohammed Khalid Rashid	1,196	22.0	+8.4
Majority				
Turnout		5,562	61.42	
Labour hold		Swing		

The incumbent was Zafar Iqbal-Din for the Labour Party who stood down at this election.

=== Rastrick ward ===
Rastrick
Party	Candidate	Votes	%	±%
Conservative	Christine Beal	2,574	47.5	−6.5
Liberal Democrats	Martin David Robinson	1,438	26.5	+8.2
Labour Co-op	Ann Martin	1,409	26.0	−1.7
Majority				
Turnout		5,460	64.36	
Conservative gain from English Democrat		Swing		

The incumbent was Paul Rogan for the English Democrats who stood down at this election. He had been elected as a Conservative.

=== Ryburn ward ===
Ryburn
Party	Candidate	Votes	%	±%
Conservative	Kay Barret	2,687	45.1	−1.6
Labour	Judy Gannon	1,559	26.2	+0.2
Liberal Democrats	Malcolm Graham James	1,418	23.8	−3.5
Green	Freda Mary Davis	291	4.9	+4.9
Majority				
Turnout		5,999	68.39	
Conservative hold		Swing		

The incumbent was Kay Barret for the Conservative Party.

=== Skircoat ward ===
Skircoat
Party	Candidate	Votes	%	±%
Liberal Democrats	Pauline Nash	2,748	42.1	+1.8
Conservative	Sheila Ruth Helen Jackson	2,334	35.7	−4.8
Labour Co-op	Anne Collins	1,124	17.2	+7.8
Green	Charles Gate	324	5.0	−4.8
Majority				
Turnout		6,602	68.62	
Liberal Democrats gain from Conservative		Swing		

The incumbent was Grenville Horsfall for the Conservative Party who stood down at this election.

=== Sowerby Bridge ward ===
Sowerby Bridge
Party	Candidate	Votes	%	±%
Conservative	Martin Peel	1,862	37.0	+0.2
Labour Co-op	David Draycott	1,654	32.9	+3.9
Liberal Democrats	Michael Christopher Lumb	1,510	30.0	−4.2
Majority				
Turnout		5,134	61.66	
Conservative hold		Swing		

The incumbent was Martin Peel for the Conservative Party.

=== Todmorden ward ===
Todmorden
Party	Candidate	Votes	%	±%
Liberal Democrats	Ruth Goldthorpe	1,916	33.5	−7.0
Conservative	Julie Louise Stansfield	1,665	29.1	+29.1
Labour	Jayne Booth	1,502	26.3	+4.6
Green	Mark Hill	355	6.2	+6.2
BPP	David Jones	283	4.9	+4.9
Majority				
Turnout		5,754	65.17	
Liberal Democrats hold		Swing		

The incumbent was Ruth Goldthorpe for the Liberal Democrats.

=== Town ward ===
Town
Party	Candidate	Votes	%	±%
Labour	Bob Metcalfe	1,936	39.4	+1.3
Conservative	Geoffrey Thompson	1,187	24.1	+3.2
Liberal Democrats	Mat Bowles	875	17.8	+9.4
BNP	Michael Hall	678	13.8	−12.6
Independent	Chris O'Conner	243	4.9	+4.9
Majority				
Turnout		4,958	55.92	
Labour hold		Swing		

The incumbent was Bob Metcalfe for the Labour Party.

=== Warley ward ===
Warley
Party	Candidate	Votes	%	±%
Liberal Democrats	Ashley John Richard Evans	1,905	35.3	+9.5
Labour	Rod Sutcliffe	1,437	26.6	+15.9
Conservative	David Ian Ginley	1,349	25.0	−3.3
BNP	Paul Leslie Steven Wadsworth	550	10.2	−4.8
Independent	Kelly Marie Catlow	156	2.9	+1.9
Majority				
Turnout		5,437	63.65	
Liberal Democrats gain from Conservative		Swing		

The incumbent was David Ginley for the Conservative Party.
