= Daniel Sutherland (British politician) =

British Reform politician

Daniel James Sutherland is a Reform UK councillor, the current leader of Calderdale Metropolitan Borough Council. He was previously a Labour cabinet member on Calderdale Council before defecting in 2025.

== Career ==
=== Council appointments ===
Sutherland has been a councillor for Illingworth and Mixenden on Calderdale Metropolitan Borough Council since 2010. For fifteen years he represented the centre-left Labour Party, becoming a cabinet member and senior figure in the local party.

In May 2012, his mother, Lisa Lambert, was elected to another seat in the same ward. In February 2025, Sutherland defected to far-right Reform UK, becoming Calderdale's first Reform councillor and only the second Labour councillor in the UK to switch to Reform. He said he left Labour as the party was moving ever further from the working-class values he once associated with it, and that he chose Reform because it doesn't "play party political games".

Sutherland, as a Labour councillor, was the cabinet member for Planning, Housing and Environment and had been Chair of the Planning Committee. When he joined Reform, he became its leader; as a result, when Reform took majority control of Calderdale Council in 2026, he became council leader.

== Political views ==
=== Housing ===
Sutherland opposed the bedroom tax in 2013.

He significantly contributed to Calderdale's Local Plan. Under his portfolio involving planning and housing, in 2016, he fielded a successful motion to, among other targets, increase housebuilding and make the housing ladder more accessible for young people and families. He said that while hundreds of affordable homes had been built in Calderdale in the previous eight years, "we know that more needs to be done." Following its multi-year drafting process, the draft Local Plan was published in 2018. At this time, Sutherland additionally noted the need to create and retain jobs. Labour's vision for the Local Plan was to encourage demographic population growth and economic sustainability, rather than "stand still" by only providing for the present.

As Reform leader, in 2026, he opposed the Local Plan he had helped produce, saying that "numbers have changed" as "the population of Calderdale is not growing." He said that Calderdale's demographics skew older and more should be done to accommodate needs of the current ageing population instead.

=== Environment ===
Both as a Labour and Reform councillor, Sutherland has prioritised preventing development on greenbelt land in Calderdale. In his 2016 motion involving the Local Plan, he targeted the construction of sustainable housing with a preference for building on brownfield land to minimise the impact on greenfield and greenbelt land. There are some areas of Calderdale where planning applications on greenbelt would still be considered, with Sutherland as Reform leader later vouching to fully protect the greenbelt.

When Calderdale became one of the first local authorities to declare climate emergency, in 2019, Sutherland promoted the motion and said that it "truly is an emergency and will require significant action at local, national and international levels if we are to limit the damage being caused to our environment and provide a secure future for the next generation." However, under Sutherland's Reform council, the cabinet position for Climate Action was scrapped. His party's opposition to a highly controversial wind farm plan stated that Reform UK Calderdale would "fight to scrap Net Zero", as part of the national party's climate change denial policy.

=== Geopolitics ===
Sutherland's contributions to Calderdale's Local Plan included, in 2016, exploring solutions to mitigate negative impacts of Brexit on the construction industry.

In 2024, he supported what was a unanimous motion in Calderdale Council to condemn Israel for its actions in the Gaza Strip and call for a ceasefire. Sutherland told the media that he did not think ceasefire was adequately defined and did not go far enough, opining that the conflict was not a war but Israel as "one of [the world's] most advanced military powers" committing "a massacre [of] largely unarmed civilians, many of them children" and that politicians at all levels should do as much as they can to campaign for lasting peace in the region.

== Election results ==
Sutherland was first elected to Calderdale Council in 2010, and was successfully re-elected in 2014, 2018, 2022 and 2026, each time representing Illingworth and Mixenden.

Each ward has three seats, which are elected on a cycle. In 2026, an all-out election was held in Calderdale due to boundary changes, electing every seat in every ward again.

2010
Party	Candidate	Votes	%	±%
Labour	Daniel James Sutherland	1,995	36.7	+8.9
Turnout		5,470	58.20	
Labour gain from BNP		Swing		

The incumbent was Geoffrey Wallace for the BNP who stood down at this election.

2014
Party	Candidate	Votes	%	±%
Labour	Daniel James Sutherland	1,160	41.1	▲4.7
Majority		128	4.5	▼6.3
Turnout		2,820	31.3	▼26.9
Labour hold		Swing	▼16.0	

The incumbent was Daniel Sutherland for the Labour Party. The swing is expressed between Labour & UKIP.

2018
Party	Candidate	Votes	%	±%
Labour	Dan Sutherland	1,398	52.0	10.8
Majority		393	14.6	10.1
Turnout		2,691	30.0	−1.3
Labour hold		Swing	-3.8	

The incumbent was Dan Sutherland for the Labour Party. There was a swing of 3.8% from Labour to Conservative. UKIP which did not stand this time got over 35% of the vote in 2014.

2022
Party	Candidate	Votes	%	±%
Labour	Daniel Sutherland	1,208	48.0	−4.0
Majority		189	7.5	−7.1
Turnout		2,519	27.7	−2.3
Labour hold		Swing	-3.6	

The incumbent was Dan Sutherland for the Labour Party.

2026 (3 seats)
Party	Candidate	Votes	%	±%
Reform	Nikki Kelly	1,774	57.4	
Reform	Dan Sutherland*	1,738	56.2	
Reform	Andrew Tagg	1,657	53.6	
Rejected ballots		5	0.2	
Turnout		3095	37.0	+11.7
Reform gain from Labour		Swing		
Reform hold		Swing		
Reform gain from Labour		Swing		
