= 2019 Calderdale Metropolitan Borough Council election =

2019 UK local government election

Calderdale Metropolitan Borough Council Elections, 2019
- 2 May 2019

One third (17 of 51) to Calderdale Metropolitan Borough Council 26 seats needed for a majority
	First party	Second party	Third party
Leader	Tim Swift	Scott Benton	James Baker
Party	Labour	Conservative	Liberal Democrats
Leader's seat	Town	Brighouse	Warley
Seats won	10, 58.8%	4	2
Seat change	▲4	▼6	▲1
Popular vote	20,668	16,608	7,849
Percentage	37.3%	30.0%	14.2%
Swing	▼4.6%	▼4.8%	▲3.5%
Council control before election
No Overall Control
Council control after election
Labour

2019 local election results in Calderdale

The 2019 Calderdale Metropolitan Borough Council election took place on 2 May 2019 to elect members of Calderdale Metropolitan Borough Council in England. This was on the same day as other local elections. One councillor was elected in each ward for a four-year term so the councillors elected in 2019 last stood for election in 2015. Each ward is represented by three councillors, the election of which is staggered, so only one third of the councillors were elected in this election. Before the election there was no overall control with a minority Labour administration. Following the election Labour, having gained four councillors, took control of the council with an overall majority of five seats.

In May 2019 Councillor Colin Peel defected from the Conservative Party to Change UK. After the dissolution of the party he retained his seat as an independent councillor.

In November 2019 Councillor Roger Taylor was suspended from the Conservative Party over alleged Islamophobic comments.

== Council results ==
2019 Calderdale Metropolitan Borough Council election
Party	This election			Full council			This election		
Party	Seats	Net	Seats %	Other	Total	Total %	Votes	Votes %	+/−
Labour	10	▲4	58.8	18	28	54.9	20,668	37.3	–4.6
Conservative	4	▼6	23.5	10	14	27.5	16,608	30.0	–4.8
Liberal Democrats	2	▲1	11.8	5	7	13.7	7,849	14.2	+3.5
Independent	1	▲1	5.9	1	2	3.9	3,016	5.4	–2.2
Green	0	Steady	0.0	0	0	0.0	5,192	9.4	+5.2
Yorkshire	0	Steady	0.0	0	0	0.0	859	1.6	+1.3
For Britain	0	Steady	0.0	0	0	0.0	287	0.5	New
National Front	0	Steady	0.0	0	0	0.0	152	0.3	+0.1

== Council Composition ==
Prior to the election the composition of the council was:

↓
24	20	6	1
Labour	Conservative	Lib Dem	Ind

After the election the composition of the council was:

↓
28	14	7	2
Labour	Conservative	Lib Dem	Ind

Party	Previous council	New council
Labour	24	28
Conservative	20	14
Liberal Democrats	6	7
Independent	1	2
Total	51	51

== Ward results ==
=== Brighouse ward ===
Brighouse
Party	Candidate	Votes	%	±%
Conservative	Scott Lloyd Benton	1,910	55.7	+9.9
Labour	Oliver George Willows	662	19.3	−9.9
Yorkshire	Philip Lumb	517	15.1	+15.1
Green	Kim Atkinson	317	9.2	+5.1
Majority		1248	36.4	+19.8
Turnout		3428	40.9	−26.5
Conservative hold		Swing	0	

The incumbent was Scott Benton for the Conservative Party. Swing shown is Conservative against Labour.

=== Calder ward ===
Calder
Party	Candidate	Votes	%	±%
Labour	Dave Young	2,517	54.0	+15.0
Green	Alan Patrick McDonald	757	16.2	−3.5
Liberal Democrats	Ruth Christine Coleman-Taylor	681	14.6	+4.9
Conservative	Joe William Atkinson	624	13.4	−5.5
Majority		1760	37.8	+18.8
Turnout		4661	50.5	−25.8
Labour hold		Swing	+5.75	

The incumbent was Dave Young for the Labour Party. The swing shown is Labour against Green. The swing for Labour against Conservative, who were second in the previous election, is +4.8.

=== Elland ward ===
Elland
Party	Candidate	Votes	%	±%
Labour	Victoria Margaret Porritt	1,090	37.1	+5.3
Conservative	John Frank Brearley Ford	961	32.7	−3.1
Liberal Democrats	Javed Bashir	486	16.5	−7.7
Green	Barry Edward Crossland	347	11.8	+4.9
Majority		129	4.4	
Turnout		2940	33.8	−27.8
Labour gain from Conservative		Swing	+1.1	

The incumbent was John Ford for the Conservative Party. The swing is for Labour against Conservative.

=== Greetland & Stainland ward ===
Greetland & Stainland
Party	Candidate	Votes	%	±%
Liberal Democrats	Sue Holdsworth	1,494	49.2	+23.5
Conservative	Jacob Nathaniel Cook	827	27.2	−13.3
Labour	Paul Richard Clarke	384	12.7	−4.8
Green	Mark Richard Mullany	275	9.1	+5.2
Majority		667	22.0	
Turnout		3035	36.0	−33.9
Liberal Democrats gain from Conservative		Swing	+5	

The incumbent was Chris Pearson for the Conservative Party who stood down at this election. The swing is for Liberal Democrats against Conservatives.

=== Hipperholme & Lightcliffe ward ===
Hipperholme & Lightcliffe
Party	Candidate	Votes	%	±%
Conservative	David Eric Kirton	1,678	54.2	−8.4
Labour	Keith John Butterick	676	21.8	+1.5
Green	Martin John Hey	440	14.2	+6
Liberal Democrats	Mason Manley	237	7.7	+0.1
Majority		1002	32.4	−10
Turnout		3094	34.3	
Conservative hold		Swing	-3.5	

The incumbent was David Kirton for the Conservative Party. The swing is Conservative against Labour.

=== Illingworth & Mixenden ward ===
Illingworth & Mixenden
Party	Candidate	Votes	%	±%
Labour	Stephanie Clarke	969	40.3	+0.9
Conservative	Guy Beech	803	33.4	+4.3
Independent	Sean Loftus	311	12.9	+11.6
Green	John Richard Ward Nesbitt	170	7.1	+4.5
Liberal Democrats	Mark Stephen Pittaway	119	4.9	+2.6
Majority		166	6.9	−3.4
Turnout		2405	26.9	
Labour hold		Swing	+2.6	

The incumbent was Barry Collins for the Labour Party who stood down at this election. Swing is Labour against Conservative.

=== Luddendenfoot ward ===
Luddendenfoot
Party	Candidate	Votes	%	±%
Labour	Roisin Cavanagh	1,570	44.8	+14.9
Conservative	Nicola Jayne May	946	27.0	−5.3
Liberal Democrats	Stephne Cavell Harrison	553	15.8	+1.1
Green	Kieran Luke Turner	370	10.6	+0.3
Majority		624	17.8	
Turnout		3503	43.5	
Labour gain from Conservative		Swing	+4.8	

The incumbent was Nicola May for the Conservative Party. The swing shown is Labour against Conservative

=== Northowram & Shelf ward ===
Northowram & Shelf
Party	Candidate	Votes	%	±%
Conservative	Roger Laurence Taylor	1,817	56.5	−4.2
Labour	David Henry Wager	568	17.7	−9
Yorkshire	Daniel Richard Manning	342	10.6	+10.6
Green	Elaine Hey	331	10.3	+3.5
Liberal Democrats	John Dennis Reynolds	120	3.7	−0.5
Majority		1249	38.8	+4.7
Turnout		3215	35.3	−6.6
Conservative hold		Swing		

The incumbent was Roger Taylor for the Conservative party. The swing shown is Conservative against Labour.

=== Ovenden ward ===
Ovenden
Party	Candidate	Votes	%	±%
Labour Co-op	Bryan Thomas Raymond Smith	803	43.7	−3.9
Conservative	Ben Marcus Hardick	362	19.7	−3.5
Liberal Democrats	Sean Bamforth	249	13.6	+10.9
Independent	Jo Redfearn	228	12.4	+12.4
Green	David Booth	155	8.4	+4.7
Majority		441	24.0	−1.2
Turnout		1835	21.8	
Labour hold		Swing	-3.7	

The incumbent was Bryan Smith for the Labour Party. The swing is for Labour against Conservatives.

=== Park ward ===
Park
Party	Candidate	Votes	%	±%
Labour	Faisal Shoukat	3,518	86.7	+14.7
Conservative	Naveed Khan	268	6.6	−10.3
Green	Derek Lloyd Sykes	160	3.9	−0.7
Liberal Democrats	James Leonard Troke	90	2.2	−2.9
Majority		3250	80.0	+24.9
Turnout		4060	43.2	
Labour hold		Swing	+2.2	

The incumbent was Faisal Shoukat for the Labour Party. Swing shown is Labour against Conservative.

=== Rastrick ward ===
Rastrick
Party	Candidate	Votes	%	±%
Conservative	Chris Pillai	1,488	49.9	+2.7
Labour Co-op	Peter Judge	833	27.9	−8.3
Green	Kaye Sweeny	340	11.4	+5.9
Liberal Democrats	Kathleen Haigh-Hutchinson	262	8.8	+1.8
Majority		809	21.8	+10.8
Turnout		2984	35.8	
Conservative hold		Swing	+2.8	

The incumbent was Chris Pillai for the Conservative Party. Swing is for Conservatives against Labour.

=== Ryburn ward ===
Ryburn
Party	Candidate	Votes	%	±%
Independent	Robert Holden	1,852	49.9	+49.9
Conservative	Robert Ernest Thornber	1043	28.1	−24
Labour	Cal Stuart Duffy	413	11.1	−11.3
Green	Freda Mary Davis	237	6.4	−0.1
Liberal Democrats	Rosemary Tatchell	144	3.9	−2.2
Majority		809	21.8	
Turnout		3710	41.6	
Independent gain from Conservative		Swing	+13	

The incumbent was Robert Thornber for the Conservative Party. The swing shown is for the Independent, Robert Holden, against the Conservative Party. The swing for the Conservatives against Labour was -17.7.

=== Skircoat ward ===
Skircoat
Party	Candidate	Votes	%	±%
Labour Co-op	Mike Barnes	1,725	42.0	+15.9
Conservative	Jeff Featherstone	1,257	30.6	−17.2
Independent	John Joseph Wainwright	625	15.2	+15.2
Liberal Democrats	Alexander Nigel Sutcliffe	239	5.8	−9.7
Green	Finn Mygind Jensen	231	5.6	−3.7
Majority		468	11.4	
Turnout		4103	42.7	
Labour gain from Conservative		Swing	+0.7	

The incumbent was Marcus Thompson for the Conservative Party who stood down at this election. Swing is for Labour against Conservative.

=== Sowerby Bridge ward ===
Sowerby Bridge
Party	Candidate	Votes	%	±%
Labour	Audrey Smith	1,250	40.7	+2.1
Conservative	Mike Payne	1,143	37.2	−6
Green	Verity Ann Curtis	341	11.1	+1.1
Liberal Democrats	Tom Stringfellow	282	9.2	+2.5
Majority		107	3.5	
Turnout		3074	35.5	
Labour gain from Conservative		Swing	+2	

The incumbent was Mike Payne for the Conservative Party. Swing is Labour against Conservatives.

=== Todmorden ward ===
Todmorden
Party	Candidate	Votes	%	±%
Labour	Silvia Dacre	1,527	45.2	+6.9
Liberal Democrats	Mick Taylor	803	23.8	+16.5
Green	Angharad Lois Turner	441	13.0	+2.4
Conservative	James Aananda Pillai	408	12.1	−16.4
National Front	Chris Jackson	152	4.5	+2.1
Majority		724	21.4	+11.6
Turnout		3380	37.3	
Labour hold		Swing	+11.7	

The incumbent was Carol Machell for the Labour Party who stood down at this election. Swing is for Labour against the Conservatives.

=== Town ward ===
Town
Party	Candidate	Votes	%	±%
Labour Co-op	Tim Swift	1,065	43.9	+3.1
Conservative	Mark Llewellyn Edwards	690	28.4	+0.2
For Britain	Jamie Lee Rushworth	287	11.8	+11.8
Green	Polly Jack	233	9.6	+4.8
Liberal Democrats	Alexander Parsons-Hulse	120	4.9	+2
Majority		375	15.5	+2.9
Turnout		2427	27.4	
Labour hold		Swing	1.7	

The incumbent was Tim Swift for the Labour Party. Swing show is for Labour against the Conservatives.

=== Warley ward ===
Warley
Party	Candidate	Votes	%	±%
Liberal Democrats	James Douglas Baker	1,877	53.0	+19.3
Labour	Helen Sutcliffe	1098	31.0	−1.7
Conservative	Jill Smith-Moorhouse	383	10.8	−16.2
Green	Katie Witham	140	4.0	−1.4
Majority		779	22.0	+21
Turnout		3542	38.6	
Liberal Democrats hold		Swing	+8.8	

The incumbent was James Baker for the Liberal Democrats. Swing shown is Liberal Democrats against Labour.
