= Price adjustment (retail) =

Competitive practice in retail stores

Price adjustments, also called price protection, is a retail practice in which customers can obtain a partial refund of the purchase price of an item if they can show it on sale at a lower price within a fixed time frame. In such circumstances, retailers will do a “price adjustment,” refunding the difference between the price the customer paid and the price now available. For example, if a customer buys a TV for $300, and it drops in price by $100, they can go back to the retailer to ask for a price adjustment and get the difference returned to them.

In some countries, the practice is marketed under different names. For example, in the United Kingdom, several retailers refer to it as a “Price Match Promise” or “Price Guarantee.”

The practice is distinct from return policies: price adjustments allow a refund of the difference even if the item has already been used, whereas returns generally require the item to be in unused or resaleable condition. Returns, on the other hand, usually need to be in unused condition. Some retailers apply different rules to in-store and online purchases, and many exclude certain categories—such as clearance, promotional, or limited-time sale items.

Price adjustments also differ from price-matching policies. Price matching refers to refunding or matching the difference between a retailer’s price and that of a competitor. Price adjustment, by contrast, applies only when the same retailer lowers the price of an item after purchase.

Retailers that have offered price adjustment policies include John Lewis and Currys in the United Kingdom, Best Buy and Macy’s in the United States, and various department stores and electronics chains in other countries. The specific time window and conditions vary by market and retailer.
