= Property ladder =

Homeowner terminology

The term property ladder—or housing ladder—, widely used in the United Kingdom, describes the relative differences in constant terms from cheaper to more expensive housing.

According to this metaphor, an individual or a family can progress by stages from starter homes (for younger first-time buyers who are typically at the bottom of the property ladder) to move-up houses to more expensive houses that are at the top. "Getting on to the property ladder" is the process of buying one's first house and holding a place on the property market.

The Oxford English Dictionary traces use of the phrase "property ladder" back to 1941 in the journal Eugenics.

== See also ==
- Affordability of housing in the United Kingdom
- Real-estate bubble
- 2000s United States housing bubble
