= Starter home =

First house purchased by a person or family

A starter home or starter house is a house that is usually the first which a person or family can afford to purchase, often using a combination of savings and mortgage financing. In the real estate industry the term commonly denotes small one- or two-bedroom houses, often older homes but sometimes low-cost new developments. The concept originated in the United States during the post-World War II era when entry-level home ownership was a preferred option for young families and regarded as part of the American Dream.

The original concept of a newly built starter home outside of the city has changed due to both the end of low-cost land development and the changing preferences of successive generations in the United States. Since the end of the 20th century, more new homeowners are seeking different kinds of housing such as a condominium or older existing homes.

== Changes in the 21st century ==
The median age of US homebuyers has increased in recent decades, especially since 2020.

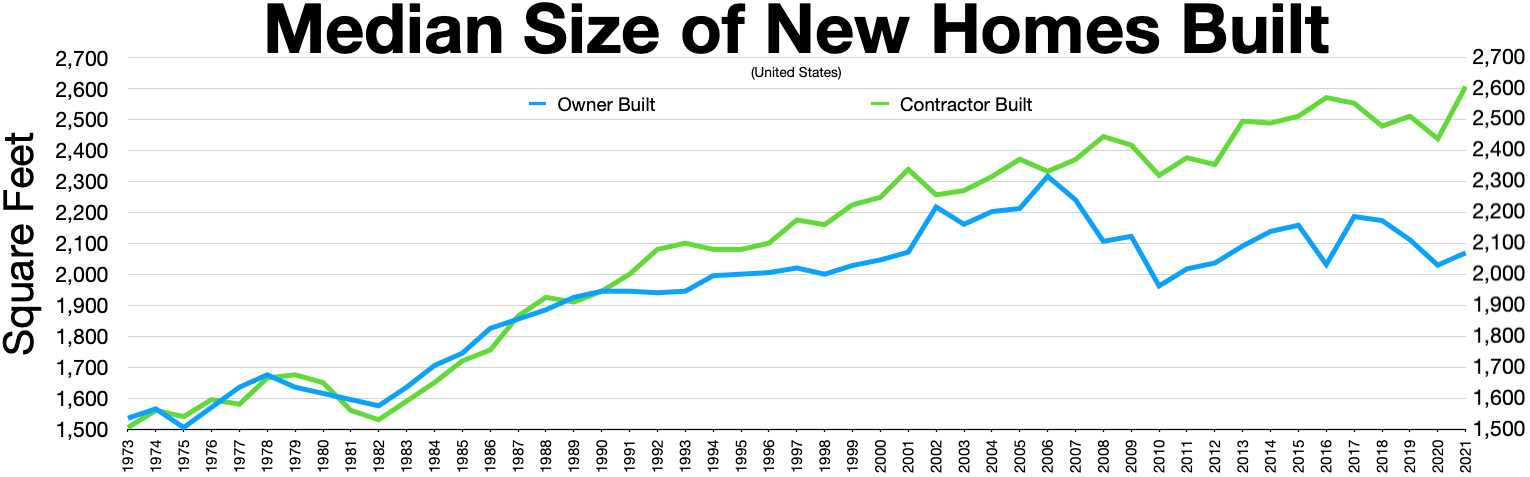
Median size of new single family home built Contractor built Owner built

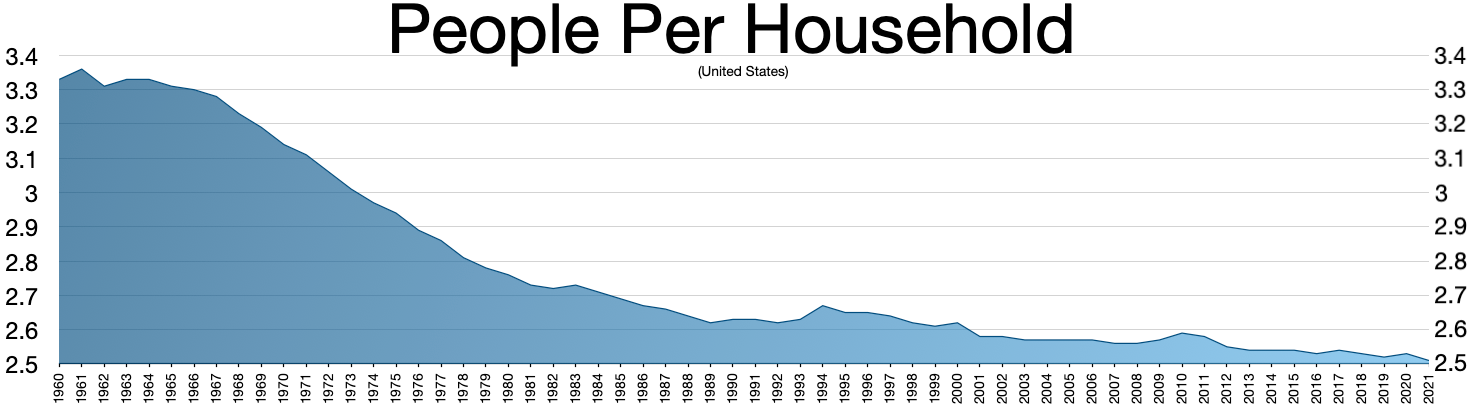
People per household 1960–2021 Median people per household hit 2.51 in 2021

In the United States, as real-estate market conditions continue to inflate and rise in major and medium cities where growth is fast, many starter homes are only affordable or available in metropolitan area outer suburbs. The American Dream of a new-build single-family home on a previously unused lot continues to move further out of urbanized areas to capture the lowest cost land. However, as many areas in the nation experience urbanization in multiple clusters, states such as California experience diffused land economics where no low-cost land exists. This has caused many real estate developers to either develop many low-cost townhomes densely or large single-family homes at high sale prices. The latter is frequently chosen resulting in starter-homes continuing to favor people in upper income brackets as the majority of a metro area's suburbs approach build-out and the distance to work ratio approaches a maximum. Factors that influence developers include land prices, perceived value, market demand, city planning law, construction costs, and maintaining profit margins.

For the buyer's end, changing financial requirements and mortgage interest rates as low as half a percentage point may affect large groups of income brackets to not be able to finance market-determined affordable housing in the long-term. Personal income for individuals and families have also not kept up with market inflation and cost of living to overcome this. While starter homes may be considered affordable based on income, the true cost of home ownership has historically not been reflected in actual financing.

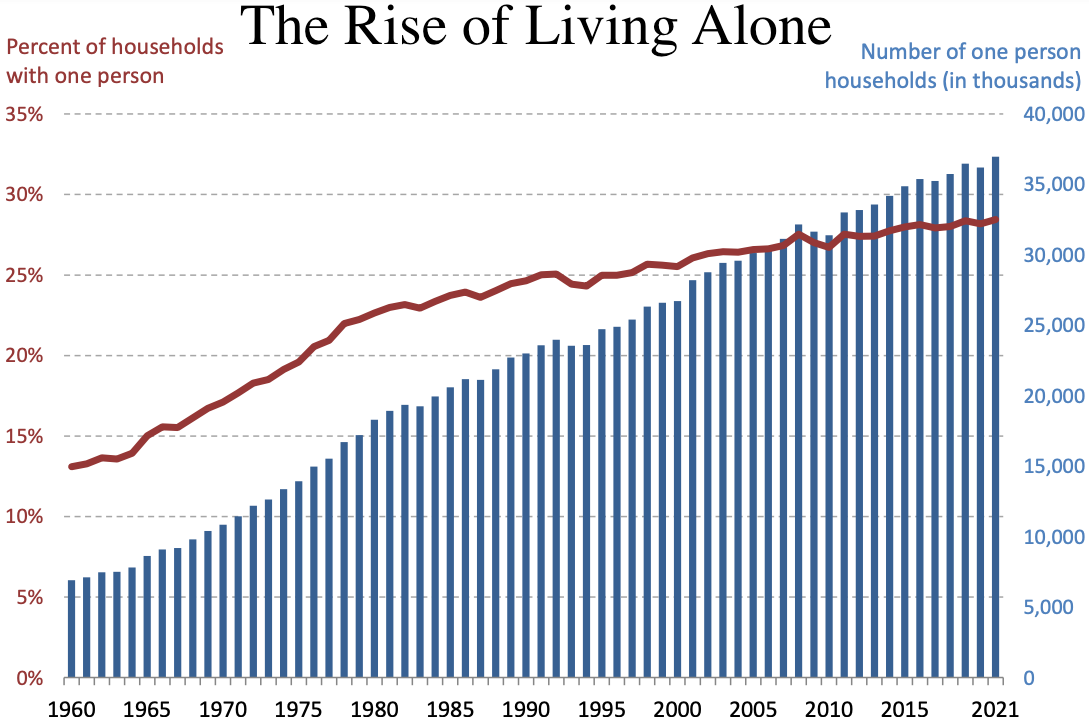
More than 37 million people live alone in a one-person household Percent of households with one person Number of one person households (thousands)

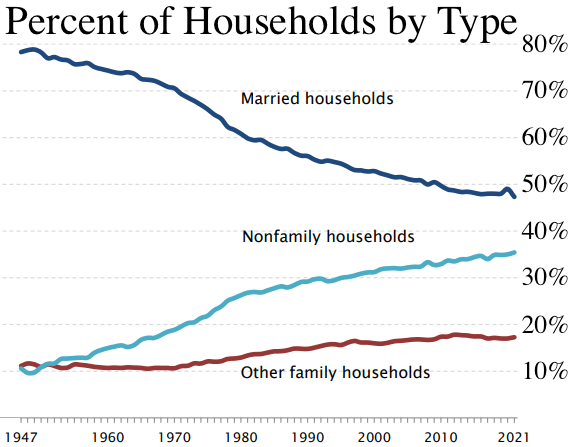
Percent of households by type Married households Non-family households Other family households

== Entry level housing ==
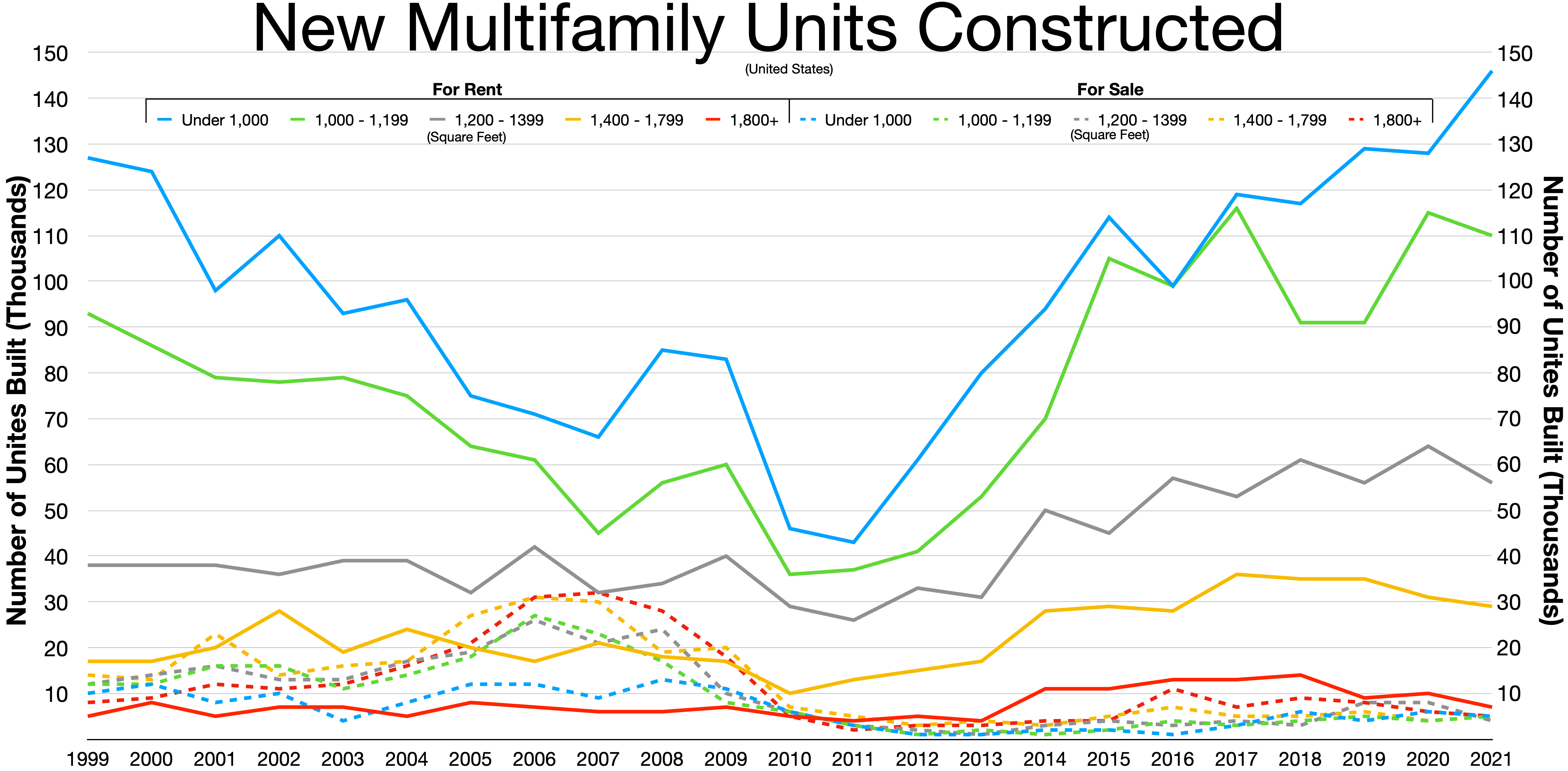
New Multifamily Units Constructed For Rent: Under 1,000 ft^{2}; 1,000 - 1,199 ft^{2}; 1,200 - 1,399 ft^{2}; 1,400 - 1,799 ft^{2}; 1,800+ ft^{2}; For Sale: Under 1,000 ft^{2}; 1,000 - 1,199 ft^{2}; 1,200 - 1,399 ft^{2}; 1,400 - 1,799 ft^{2}; 1,800+ ft^{2}

Only 8% of new single family homes built in 2021 were 1,400 sq ft (130 m^{2}) or less and in the 1940s 70% of new housing built was under 1,400 sq ft (130 m^{2}). Local governments regulate out entry level housing with square foot requirements, zoning ordinances, and permits. Condominiums of 500 to 1,000 sq ft (46 to 93 m^{2}) that can be owned instead of leased, which could be a studio, 1 bedroom, or 2 bedroom with a reasonable HOA monthly fee and property taxes would be less expensive than renting in the longer run and a way to start building wealth starting out.

== Efforts to increase availability ==
In locations with a lack of affordable housing, such as Austin, Boston, Los Angeles, New York City, Philadelphia, San Francisco or London, it may be impossible for first-time home buyers to find starter houses close to the city center. To assist such home buyers, local authorities such as that in Santa Cruz, California, have re-zoned previously commercial areas for residential housing specifically to allow developers to build starter homes. The Wall Street Journal tracks median home purchase prices of starter homes as part of its real estate index. Cities, whether suburban or the central core, have generally moved to a trend of master planned communities where large tracts of land are set aside for one complete build-out in order to maintain low costs to the developer and provide essential affordable and entry-level housing. Commercial and retail components are almost always included in these starter home communities. Salem, Massachusetts rezoned single family homes can now have a basement bedroom. Massachusetts under Charlie Baker as Governor of Massachusetts passed a law that single-family homeowners may add an Accessory Dwelling Unit (ADU) to their property By Right. The law also prevents local municipalities from imposing special permit requirements or owner-occupancy requirements.

== United Kingdom ==
A starter home in the United Kingdom is a house sold at a 20% discount to first time buyers under 40. Starter homes are a policy of the Conservative Government. Starter homes are being introduced in the Housing and Planning Bill 2015-16. The National Housing Federation have described starter homes as “yet another short-term initiative that fails to address the root of the problem”.

== See also ==
- First time home buyer grant
- Move-up home
- Missing middle housing
- Studio condo
