= First-time buyer =

Person buying a house for the first time

A first-time buyer (FTB) is a potential house buyer who has not previously purchased a residential property. The term is primarily used in the British, Irish, Canadian, and U.S. property markets, as well as other countries.

== Characteristics ==
The median age of US homebuyers has increased in recent decades, for both first-time buyers and repeat buyers.

A first-time buyer is usually desirable to a seller as they do not have to sell a property, and as such will not involve a housing chain.

In the US, Canada, and Australia, the average age of first-time buyers is usually around their mid-30s, while in the UK it's between 25 and 34 years old.

== Decision to buy a home ==
There are many factors a first-time buyer may need to consider before purchasing their first property; how much initial cash they will need for stamp duty and any solicitors fees, and if they need to arrange a mortgage how much are they able to afford.

In many countries such as United Kingdom, Canada and Australia home ownership is seen as a natural step in the life cycle and the natural form of property tenure. Canada and Australia have some of the most ownership rate in word (all above 65%) home ownership. Ireland has one of the highest proportions of owner-occupiers in the EU at around 80%.

== UK mortgages ==
As of 2021, first-time buyers represented 50% of all mortgage house purchases in the UK. In Ireland, FTB's represent 34% of the market.

The number of new buyers purchasing property declines when housing becomes unaffordable.

In the 2007 Scottish parliamentary election the Scottish National Party proposed a £2,000 grant for first-time buyers to help them get onto the property ladder.

Grants have not been forthcoming in the rest of the UK, but in July 2007 Housing Minister Yvette Cooper announced it would be broadening the government's Homebuy Shared Equity scheme to help buyers. "Unless we act now by 2026 first-time buyers will find average house prices are ten times their salary. That could lead to real social inequality and injustice," Cooper told Parliament.

Since then, first time buyers have regained momentum in the market, with reports in 2010 citing first-time buying as the most popular of consumer enquiries for a local, whole of market mortgage adviser - accounting for 37% of total enquiries.

In 2016 the UK Government launched the Help to Buy ISA for first time buyers through incentivising them to use savings to fund a deposit on a property. The money saved is then boosted by 25% up to a maximum of £3000. In April 2017, the Lifetime ISA was launched. It was launched to replace the Help to Buy ISA (which was closed in Nov 2019). The Lifetime ISA gives a similar 25% top-up from the government towards a First Time Buyer's home purchase, but also gives the flexibility to save the money and the top-up for retirement. The First Homes Scheme was launched in June 2021, which enabled first-time buyers, local people and key workers to purchase a property at a discounted rate.

The UK Help to Buy equity loan scheme closed to new applicants on 31 October 2022.

In May 2023, first-time buyer mortgage approvals in Ireland reached their highest levels since 2011, according to the Banking and Payments Federation of Ireland (BPFI).

In July 2025, the UK government announced additional funding to help those looking to purchase their first home. Usually, lenders will only offer to lend a maximum of 4.5 times a purchaser's salary, however some are now offering a boost of up to 5.5 times as a result of this news.

== See also ==
- First time home buyer grant
- Help to Buy
- Canada Mortgage and Housing Corporation
