= Purchase price adjustment =

Price changes during purchase negotiations

Purchase price adjustments capture the change in value of an asset typically between the negotiation and closing.

== Example ==
Antonio purchased property from Shylock for $50,000. At closing, Antonio paid $10,000 to Shylock and executed a promissory note payable to "Shylock or order" for $40,000. Following the closing, Antonio approached Shylock, upset that the property was in fact worth only $42,000. After a few weeks of negotiations, the parties agreed to reduce the amount of the promissory note to $32,000.

== Federal Tax Implications ==
A Purchase Price Adjustment is not included as gross income under the U.S. tax code. The adjustment between the parties is merely re-setting the amount of the purchase price. Additionally, the price adjustment has to exist between the seller and the buyer (no third parties can be involved).
