= Move-up home =

Real estate term

A move-up home is a real estate term used to describe a larger and/or more expensive home that a person moves into from a smaller home.

It is implied that as repeat buyers, the customer is more familiar with the real estate process than a first time buyer.

In 2012, CNBC highlighted the challenges facing move-up home buyers when they owed more on their current homes than they were worth.

Move-up home purchases increase when interest rates are low.

== See also ==
- Housing show
- Property ladder
- Downsizing (property)
