= Calderdale Council =

Local government body in England

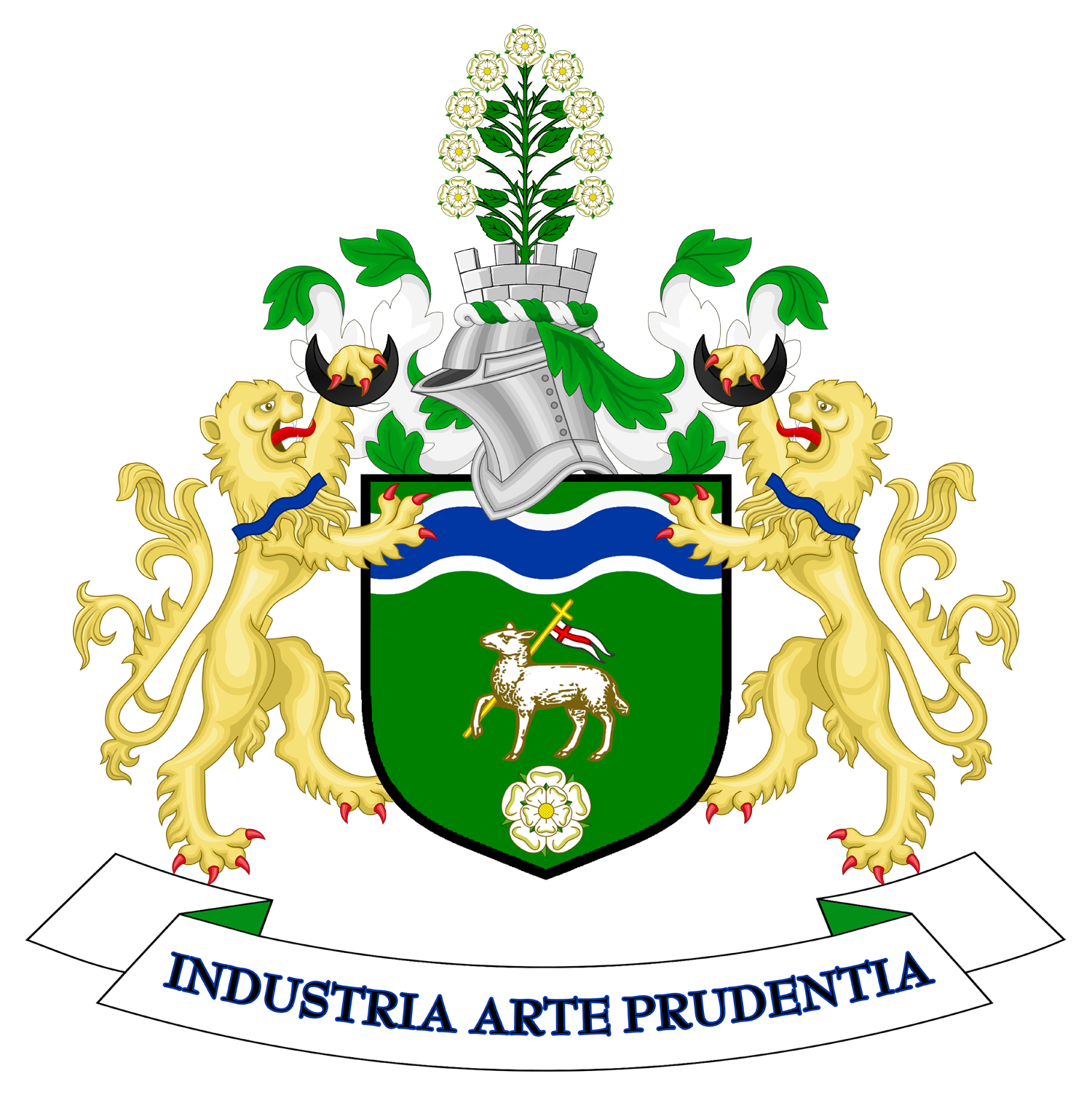
- Coat of arms

- Council Logo

Type
- Type: Metropolitan borough

History
- Founded: 1 April 1974

Leadership
- Mayor: Andrew Tagg, Reform UK since 20 May 2026
- Leader: Dan Sutherland, Reform UK since 20 May 2026
- Chief Executive: Robin Tuddenham since June 2017

Structure
- Seats: 54 councillors
- Graph of the party split among 54 seats.
- Political groups: Administration (34) Reform (34) Other parties (20) Labour (8) Green (7) Liberal Democrats (2) Workers Party (1) Independent (2)
- Joint committees: West Yorkshire Combined Authority
- Length of term: 4 years

Elections
- Voting system: First-past-the-post
- Last election: 7 May 2026
- Next election: 6 May 2027

Meeting place
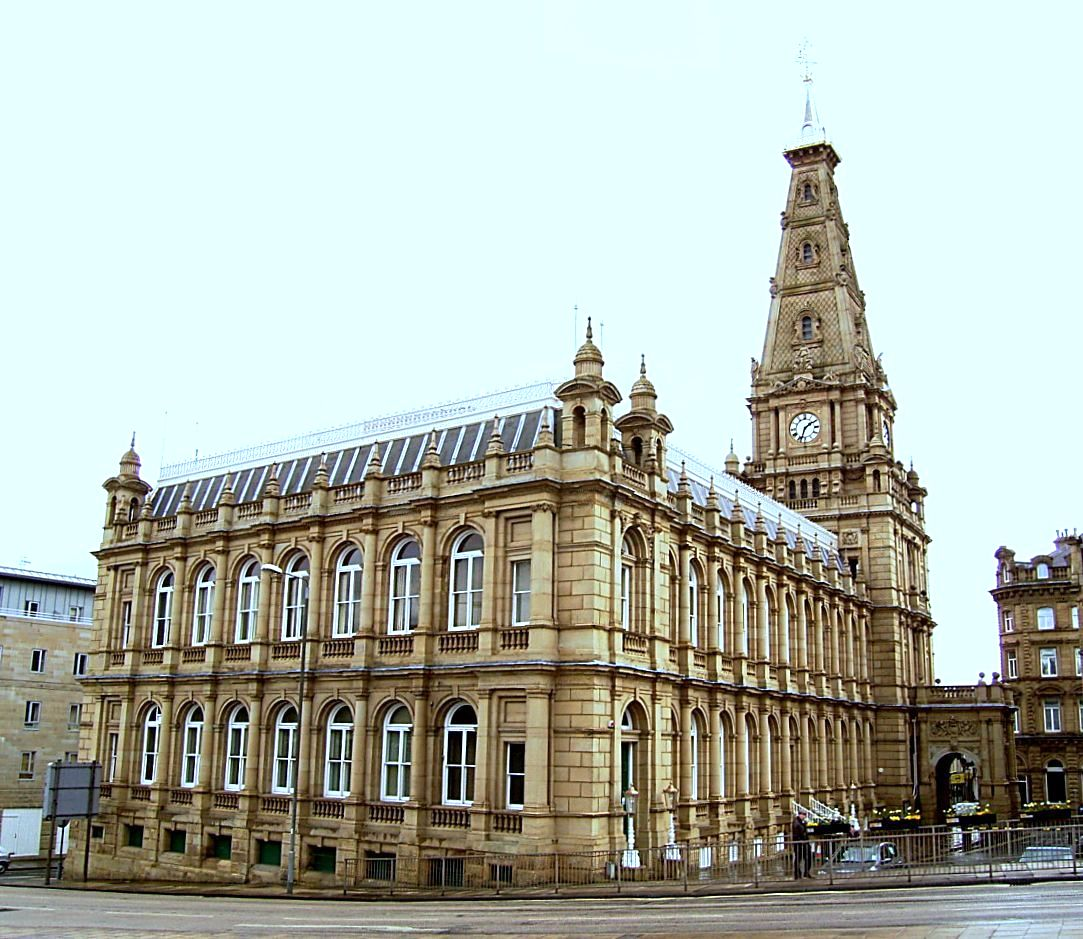
- Town Hall, Crossley Street, Halifax, HX1 1UJ

Website
- calderdale.gov.uk

Calderdale Council, also known as Calderdale Metropolitan Borough Council, is the local authority for the Metropolitan Borough of Calderdale in West Yorkshire, England. It is a metropolitan borough council and provides the majority of local government services in the borough. Since 2014 the council has been a constituent member of the West Yorkshire Combined Authority.

The council has been under Reform UK majority control since 2026. It is based at Halifax Town Hall.

== History ==
The metropolitan district of Calderdale was created on 1 April 1974 under the Local Government Act 1972. It covered the area of eight former districts and part of a ninth, which were all abolished at the same time:

- Brighouse Municipal Borough
- Elland Urban District
- Halifax County Borough
- Hebden Royd Urban District
- Hepton Rural District
- Queensbury and Shelf Urban District (Shelf part only, Queensbury went to Bradford)
- Ripponden Urban District
- Sowerby Bridge Urban District
- Todmorden Municipal Borough

The county borough of Halifax had provided all local government services in its area. The other eight districts had been lower-tier authorities with West Riding County Council providing county-level services. The new Calderdale district was awarded borough status from its creation, allowing the chair of the council to take the title of mayor.

Calderdale was initially a district-level authority, with West Yorkshire County Council providing county-level services. However, the metropolitan county councils, including West Yorkshire County Council, were abolished in 1986 under the Local Government Act 1985. Since 1986 Calderdale Council has therefore been responsible for most local government functions.

The council has been a constituent member of the West Yorkshire Combined Authority since 2014, which has been led by the directly elected Mayor of West Yorkshire since 2021.

== Governance ==
=== Political control ===
The council has been under Reform majority control since the 2026 election.

The first election to the council was held in 1973, initially operating as a shadow authority before coming into its powers on 1 April 1974. Political control of the council since 1974 has been as follows:

| Party in control | Years |
|---|---|
| Labour | 1974–1975 |
| Conservative | 1975–1980 |
| No overall control | 1980–1990 |
| Labour | 1990–1992 |
| No overall control | 1992–1995 |
| Labour | 1995–1999 |
| No overall control | 1999–2000 |
| Conservative | 2000–2002 |
| No overall control | 2002–2019 |
| Labour | 2019–2026 |
| Reform | 2026–present |

=== Composition ===
Following the 2026 election, the composition of the council was:

| Party | Seats |
|---|---|
| Reform | 34 |
| Labour | 8 |
| Green | 7 |
| Liberal Democrats | 2 |
| Workers Party | 1 |
| Independent | 2 |
| Total | 54 |

The next election is due in May 2027.

=== Leadership ===
The role of Mayor of Calderdale is largely ceremonial. Political leadership is instead provided by the leader of the council. The leaders since 1988 have been:

| Councillor | Party | From | To |
|---|---|---|---|
| Joe Tolan | Labour | May 1988 | 1990 |
| David Helliwell | Labour | May 1990 | 22 Aug 1991 |
| Joe Tolan | Labour | 25 Sep 1991 | May 1992 |
| Tony Mazey | Conservative | May 1992 | 12 May 1993 |
| Bob Sunderland | Conservative | 12 May 1993 | May 1995 |
| Pam Warhurst | Labour | May 1995 | May 1999 |
| Michael Higgins | Labour | 19 May 1999 | May 2000 |
| John Ford | Conservative | 17 May 2000 | 2006 |
| Ann McAllister | Conservative | 17 May 2006 | Sep 2008 |
| Stephen Baines | Conservative | 1 Oct 2008 | May 2010 |
| Janet Battye | Liberal Democrats | 24 May 2010 | 23 May 2012 |
| Tim Swift | Labour | 23 May 2012 | 30 Jul 2014 |
| Stephen Baines | Conservative | 30 Jul 2014 | May 2015 |
| Tim Swift | Labour | 27 May 2015 | 17 May 2023 |
| Jane Scullion | Labour | 17 May 2023 | May 2026 |
| Dan Sutherland | Reform | 20 May 2026 | |

== Premises ==
The council is based at Halifax Town Hall, which had been built for one of the council's predecessors, the Halifax Borough Council, in 1863.

== Elections ==
Since the last boundary changes took effect for the 2026 election, the council has comprised 54 councillors representing 18 wards, with each ward electing three councillors. Elections are held three years out of every four, with a third of the council (one councillor for each ward) elected each time for a four-year term of office.

=== Wards ===
Wards of Calderdale

| Calder Valley | Halifax |
|---|---|
| 1. Hebden Bridge and Todmorden East; 2. Todmorden West; 3. Luddendenfoot; 4. Ryburn; 5. Greetland; 6. Elland; 7. Hipperholme and Lightcliffe; 8. Brighouse; 9. Rastrick | 10. Illingworth and Mixenden; 11. Warley; 12. Sowerby Bridge; 13. Ovenden; 14. Park; 15. Northowram and Shelf; 16. Halifax Town; 17. Salterhebble, Southowram and Skircoat Green; 18. Wainhouse |

== Mayor ==
The mayors since 1974 have been:

| Name | Years |
|---|---|
| Steven Leigh | 2025–2026 |
| Ann Kingstone | 2024–2025 |
| Ashley Evans | 2023–2024 |
| Angie Gallagher | 2022–2023 |
| Chris Pillai | 2021–2022 |
| Dot Foster | 2019–2021 |
| Marcus Thompson | 2018–2019 |
| Ferman Ali | 2017–2018 |
| Howard Blagbrough | 2016–2017 |
| Lisa Lambert | 2015–2016 |
| Pat Allen | 2014–2015 |
| Ann Martin | 2013–2014 |
| John Hardy | 2012–2013 |
| Nader Fekri | 2011–2012 |
| Keith Watson | 2010–2011 |
| Ann McAllister | 2010 |
| Arshad Mahmood | 2009–2010 |
| Conrad Winterburn | 2008–2009 |
| Martin Peel | 2007–2008 |
| Colin Stout | 2006–2007 |
| John Williamson | 2005–2006 |
| Olwen Jennings | 2004–2005 |
| Geraldine Carter | 2003–2004 |
| Patrick Phillips | 2002–2003 |
| Chris O'Connor | 2001–2002 |
| Peter Coles | 2000–2001 |
| Graham Hall | 1999–2000 |
| Alan Worth | 1997–1999 |
| Susan Tucker | 1997 |
| Dawn Neal | 1996–1997 |
| Graham Reason | 1995–1996 |
| Stephen Pearson | 1994–1995 |
| Tony Mazey | 1993–1994 |
| Bill Carpenter | 1992–1993 |
| Tom McElroy | 1991–1992 |
| Joe Tolan | 1990–1991 |
| Joe Kneafsey | 1989–1990 |
| Albert Berry | 1988–1989 |
| Wilfred Sharp | 1987–1988 |
| David Fox | 1986–1987 |
| Tom Lawler | 1985–1986 |
| John Bradley | 1984–1985 |
| Kevin Lord | 1983–1984 |
| David Shutt | 1982–1983 |
| Eric Whitehead | 1981–1982 |
| Harry Wilson | 1980–1981 |
| Betty Wildsmith | 1979–1980 |
| Richard Deadman | 1978–1979 |
| Eric Dennett | 1977–1978 |
| Mona Mitchell | 1976–1977 |
| Kathleen Cawdry | 1975–1976 |
| Joe Tolan | 1974–1975 |
