= List of schools in Wokingham =

This is a list of schools in the Borough of Wokingham in the English county of Berkshire.

== State-funded schools ==
=== Primary schools ===
- Alder Grove CE Primary School, Shinfield
- Aldryngton Primary School, Earley
- All Saints CE Primary School, Wokingham
- Bearwood Primary School, Sindlesham
- Beechwood Primary School, Woodley
- The Colleton Primary School, Twyford
- The Coombes CE Primary School, Arborfield
- Crazies Hill CE Primary School, Crazies Hill
- Earley St Peter's CE Primary School, Earley
- Emmbrook Infant School, Emmbrook
- Emmbrook Junior School, Emmbrook
- Evendons Primary School, Wokingham
- Farley Hill Primary School, Arborfield Green
- Finchampstead CE Primary School, Finchampstead
- Floreat Montague Park Primary School, Wokingham
- Gorse Ride Infants' School, Finchampstead
- Gorse Ride Junior School, Finchampstead
- Grazeley Parochial CE Primary School, Grazeley
- Hatch Ride Primary School, Gardeners Green
- Hawkedon Primary School, Lower Earley
- The Hawthorns Primary School, Woosehill
- Highwood Primary School, Woodley
- Hillside Primary School, Lower Earley
- Keep Hatch Primary School, Wokingham
- Lambs Lane Primary School, Spencers Wood
- Loddon Primary School, Earley
- Nine Mile Ride Primary School, Finchampstead
- Oaklands Infant School, Gardeners Green
- Oaklands Junior School, Gardeners Green
- Polehampton CE Infant School, Twyford
- Polehampton CE Junior School, Twyford
- Radstock Primary School, Lower Earley
- Rivermead Primary School, Woodley
- Robert Piggott CE Infant School, Wargrave
- Robert Piggott CE Junior School, Wargrave
- St Cecilia's CE Primary School, Wokingham
- St Dominic Savio RC Primary School, Woodley
- St Nicholas CE Primary School, Hurst
- St Paul's CE Junior School, Wokingham
- St Sebastian's CE Primary School, Wokingham
- St Teresa's RC Academy, Wokingham
- Shinfield Infant School, Shinfield
- Shinfield St Mary's CE Junior School, Shinfield
- Sonning CE Primary School, Sonning
- South Lake Primary School, Woodley
- Walter Infant School, Wokingham
- Wescott Infant School, Wokingham
- Westende Junior School, Wokingham
- Wheatfield Primary School, Winnersh
- Whiteknights Primary School, Shinfield
- Willowbank Infant School, Woodley
- Willowbank Junior School, Woodley
- Windmill Primary School, Woosehill
- Winnersh Primary School, Winnersh
- Woodley CE Primary School, Woodley

=== Secondary schools ===
- Bohunt School Wokingham, Arborfield
- The Bulmershe School, Woodley
- The Emmbrook School, Emmbrook
- The Forest School, Winnersh
- The Holt School, Wokingham
- Maiden Erlegh School, Earley
- The Piggott School, Wargrave
- Oakbank School, Ryeish Green
- St Crispin's School, Wokingham
- Waingels College, Woodley

=== Special and alternative schools ===
- Addington School, Woodley
- Chiltern Way Academy, Wokingham
- Foundry College, Wokingham
- Oak Tree School, Wokingham
- Willow House Hospital Education, Wokingham

=== Further education ===
- Bracknell and Wokingham College

== Independent schools ==
=== Primary and preparatory schools ===
- Dolphin School, Hurst
- Ludgrove School, Wixenford
- OneSchool Global UK, Shinfield
- Our Lady's Preparatory School, Gardeners Green
- Waverley Preparatory School, Finchampstead

=== Senior and all-through schools ===
- Crosfields School, Shinfield
- Holme Grange School, Wokingham
- Luckley House School, Wokingham
- Reading Blue Coat School, Sonning
- Reddam House, Wokingham
- The Vine Christian School, Three Mile Cross

=== Special and alternative schools ===
- High Close School, Wokingham
- Odyssey House School, Wokingham
