= Emmbrook =

Emmbrook may refer to:

- Emmbrook, Berkshire, a suburb of the town of Wokingham, Berkshire, England
- Emm Brook, a river in Berkshire, England
- Emmbrook School, the secondary school in the area of Wokingham
