= Oakbank School =

Oakbank School may refer to:

- Oakbank School, Aberdeen, a former residential school in Aberdeen, Scotland
- Oakbank School, Ryeish Green, a secondary school in Berkshire, England
- Beckfoot Oakbank, a secondary school in West Yorkshire, England

== See also ==
- Oakbank (disambiguation)
