= Tirabad =

Coordinates: 52.0589°N 3.6372°W

- Village
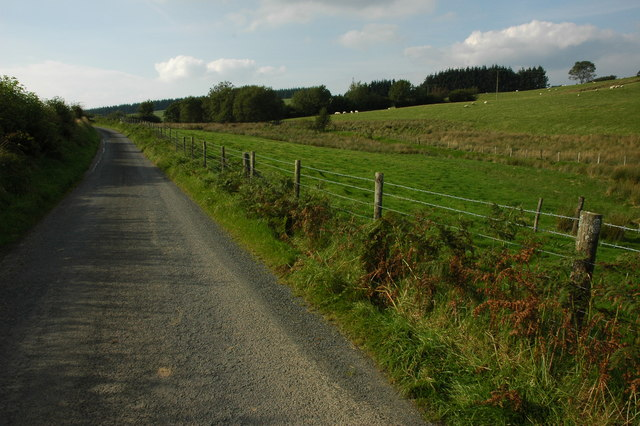
- Road to the west of Tirabad
- Community: Llangamarch
- Principal area: Powys
- Country: Wales
- Sovereign state: United Kingdom
- Police: Dyfed-Powys
- Fire: Mid and West Wales
- Ambulance: Welsh
- UK Parliament: Brecon, Radnor and Cwm Tawe
- Senedd Cymru – Welsh Parliament: Brycheiniog Tawe Nedd

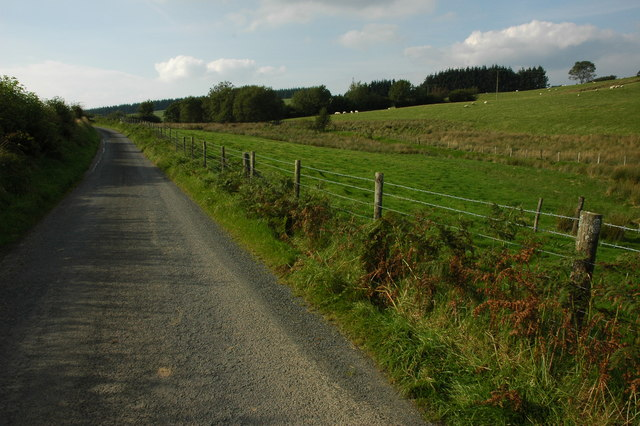
Road to the west of Tirabad

Tirabad is a village in Powys, Wales. The name means "the abbot's land"; the village belonged to Strata Florida abbey in the Middle Ages. The village is located on the edge of the Crychan Forest and is 8 kilometres (5 mi) south of Llanwrtyd and 18 kilometres (10 mi) north of Llanymddyfri. Many people had to leave the village during World War II as the military used the area for artillery training, but the village expanded substantially in the 1950s, when the Forestry Commission, now defunct, began tree plantations and built about 25 houses, a school, a village hall and a shop for their employees.

St. David's Church, built in 1726, is the only Georgian church in Brecknockshire. No services are currently held at the church due to structural problems with the building, although work is underway to enable it to be reopened.

Just outside the village is the Tirabad Centre, an outdoor pursuits centre run by the Tirabad Residential Educational Trust and owned jointly by outsiders, three state schools in Berkshire, England - Charters in Sunningdale, The Emmbrook near Wokingham and Maiden Erlegh in Earley. The Centre was closed in March 2021 and its assets taken over by liquidators.

Tirabad is on the Epynt Way long distance walking/cycling/horse-riding route. Epynt Way Section 3 uses the road that runs past the village, linking to Maesyron to the east. Epynt Way Section 4 (the "Tirabad Section") starts just west of the village near the Tirabad Old Chapel, taking a forestry track from the Cynghordy Road. Section 4 links to Craigyrwyddon and the Crychan Forest.
