= Llandeilo'r-Fan =

Coordinates: 51.999151°N 3.608836°W

Llandeilo'r-Fan: Welsh: Llandeilo'r-Fan
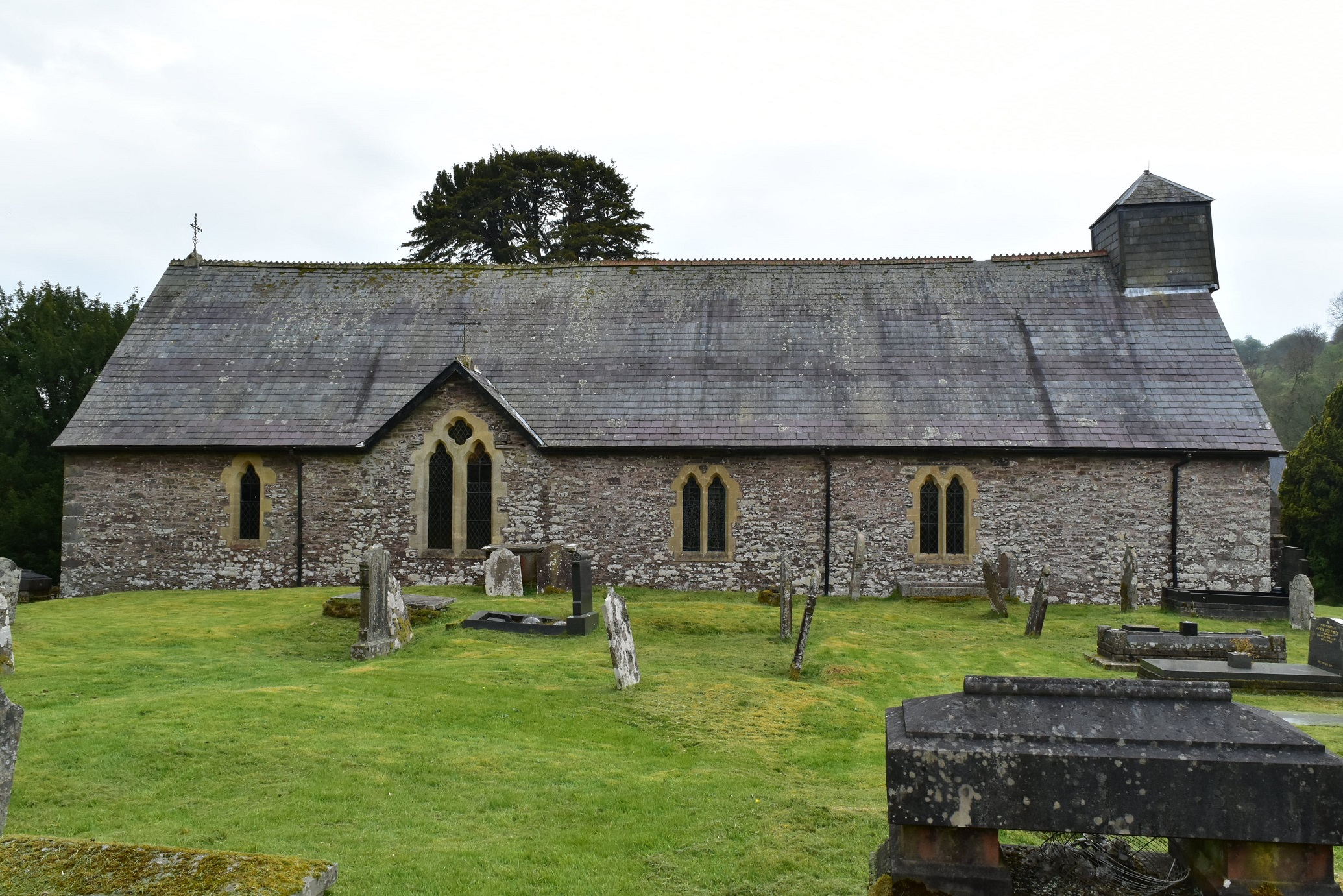
- St Teilo's Church

- Location within Powys
- Principal area: Powys
- Preserved county: Powys
- Country: Wales
- Sovereign state: United Kingdom
- Post town: Brecon
- Postcode district: LD3
- Police: Dyfed-Powys
- Fire: Mid and West Wales
- Ambulance: Welsh
- UK Parliament: Brecon, Radnor and Cwm Tawe
- Senedd Cymru – Welsh Parliament: Brecon and Radnorshire

Llandeilo'r-Fan is a small village located in Powys, Wales. It is located between Llandovery and Brecon. It is very rural and is located in a hilly area of Mid Wales. The village has a church, community hall and a few houses. The nearest shop and pub are in Sennybridge.

Llandeilo'r-Fan is the end of the public road up from the Usk valley, which continues into the Sennybridge Training Area (SENTA) above the village. There is a cattle grid and a red flag flying, which prohibits public access along the road over the Epynt mountain to Dixies Corner. However, access is allowed to the Epynt Way sections 6 and 7 (walking/cycling/horse-riding), which end just beyond the military range boundary. There is a horse corral which is also suitable for car parking here, named as "Epynt Way Section 7" on Google maps.
