= TT races =

TT races usually refers to the Isle of Man TT, motorcycle road races held annually in the Isle of Man

The term may also refer to:

- Welsh TT races - historic motorcycle road races originally held annually on Pendine Sands, Wales, UK circa 1920
- Welsh TT races - historic motorcycle road races originally held annually at Mynydd Epynt, Wales, UK circa 1950
- Dutch TT - a traditional name applied to the annual Grand Prix motorcycle races held at the Assen Circuit in The Netherlands
  - TT Circuit Assen
