= Woosehill =

Suburb of Wokingham, England

Coordinates: 51.412°N 0.859°W

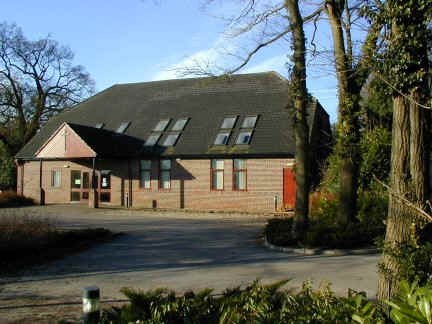
The Woosehill Community Church

Woosehill is a suburb of Wokingham in the English county of Berkshire.

Woosehill – spelled incorrectly as Woose Hill on Ordnance Survey maps – is the north-western region of Wokingham, adjoining Emmbrook. The Emm Brook forms its eastern boundary and the Bearwood Road its western boundary, past the wooded area around Round Hill. Built primarily in the 1980s, it contains a wide range of family homes and bungalows. Amenities include a Morrisons supermarket, Chinese takeaway and doctor's surgery.

There are also two primary schools, Hawthorns and Windmill, and two pre-schools, Chestnuts and Yellowbrick. There is a 24-hour veterinary clinic located next door to Morrisons in the building of the old surgery. The surgery has now moved to Fernlea Drive, adjacent to the Morrisons car park.

In Chestnut Avenue, off Northway, there is the Woosehill Community Church.
