= Fred Millett =

British artist and muralist (1920-1980)

Fred Millett

Fred Millett (1920–1980) was a British muralist and poster artist whose work was exhibited at the Festival of Britain and who was commissioned by London County Council, London Transport, National Westminster Bank, University of York, and the General Post Office.

== Early life and family ==
Fred Millett was born in 1920. He studied at the Central School of Art in London.

== Career ==
Primarily a muralist and poster artist, Millett's work was exhibited at the Festival of Britain and he was commissioned by London County Council, London Transport, National Westminster Bank, the University of York, and the General Post Office.

Around 1952, Millett painted murals of Autumn, Winter, and Summer at St Crispin's School in Wokingham, Berkshire.

From the middle 1960s, he taught Perception and Communication at the Polytechnic of Central London.

== Death ==
Millett died in 1980.

== Selected works ==
=== Murals ===
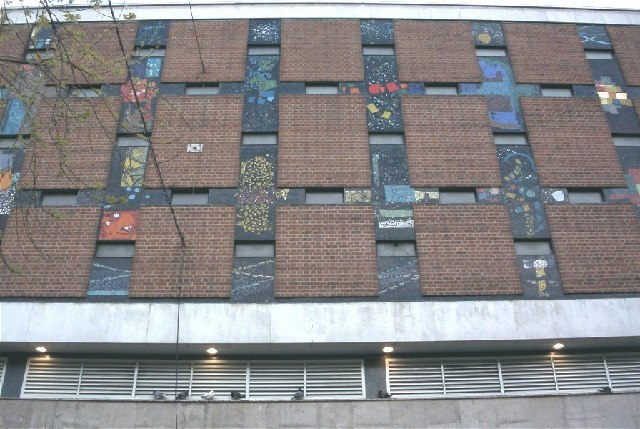
Mosaic tiles at the Coventry Central Library

- Assembly Hall mural at Danegrove Primary School, East Barnet.
- Seasons Murals, St Crispin's School, Wokingham, Berkshire, c. 1952.
- Mosaic tiles at the Locarno Dancehall, now Coventry Central Library, 1958–60.

=== Posters ===
- The Tufted Duck, London Transport, 1962.
- London after Dark, London Transport, 1968.

=== Sculpture ===
- Six sculptural relief panels in concrete at Derwent College, University of York, 1965.
- Sculpted Wall, Raglan Estate, Camden, 1965.
