= Gardeners Green =

Hamlet in Berkshire, England

Coordinates: 51.393492°N 0.815806°W

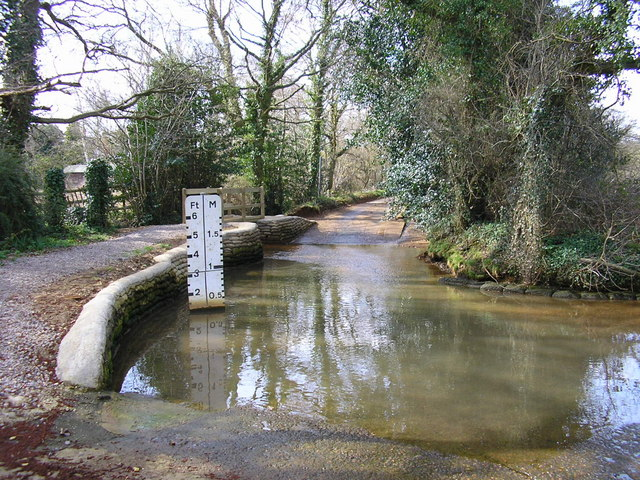
- Redlake Lane Ford in Gardeners Green

- Location within Berkshire
- OS grid reference: SU827672
- Metropolitan borough: Wokingham
- Metropolitan county: Berkshire
- Region: South East
- Country: England
- Sovereign state: United Kingdom
- Post town: WOKINGHAM
- Postcode district: RG40
- Dialling code: 0118
- Police: Thames Valley
- Fire: Royal Berkshire
- Ambulance: South Central
- UK Parliament: Berkshire

Gardeners Green is a hamlet in Berkshire, England, and part of the civil parish of Wokingham Without (where in the 2011 Census the population was included). The settlement lies surrounded by farmland between Wokingham and Crowthorne, and is located 1.5 miles (2.4 km) south-east of Wokingham. At the junction of Honey Hill and Redlake Lane is The Crooked Billet public house. To the east of the hamlet is the ford on Redlake Lane, so named because of the heavy iron staining in the water.
