= Holme Green, Berkshire =

Hamlet in Berkshire, England

Coordinates: 51.396924°N 0.808339°W

Holme Green
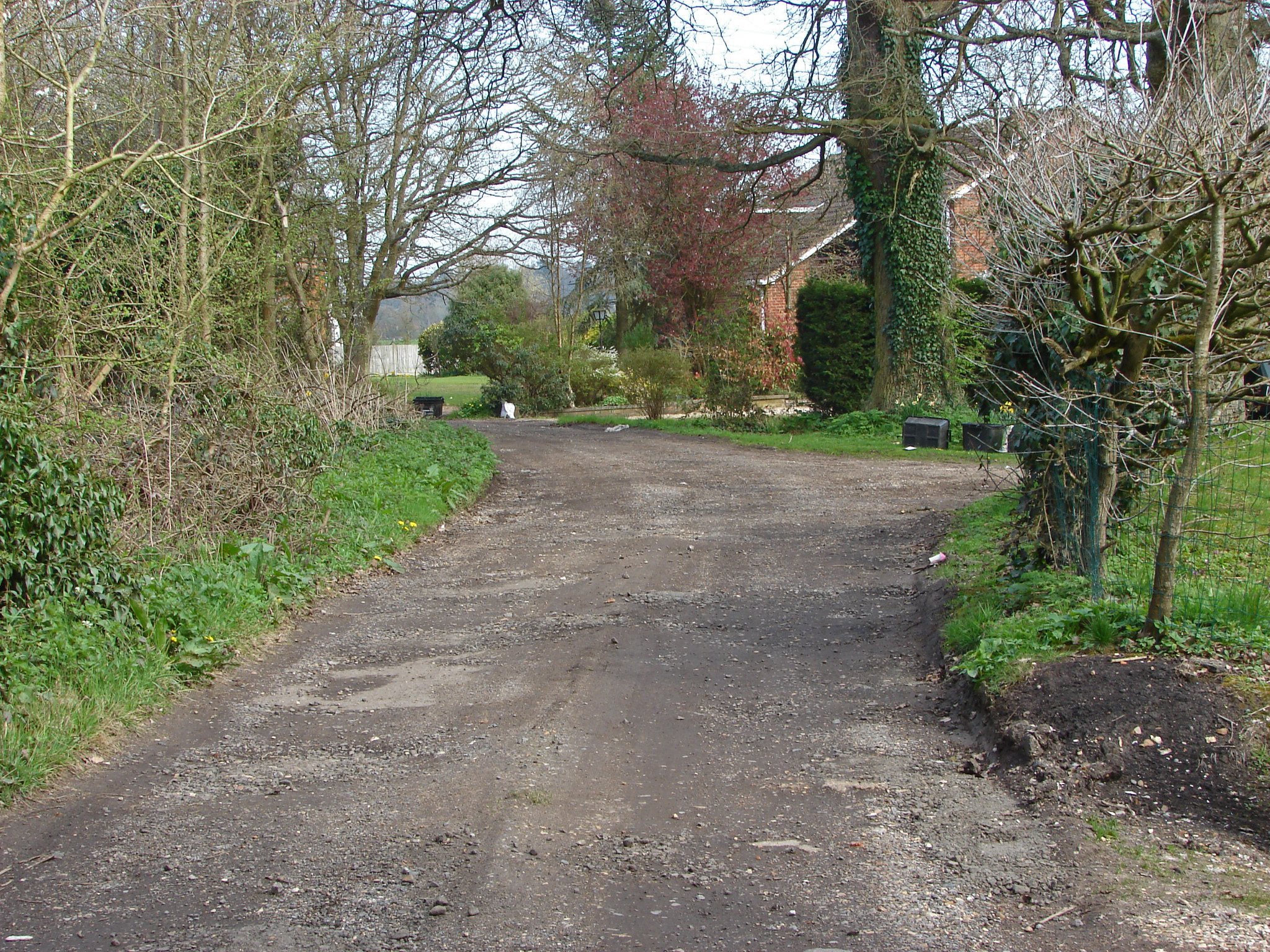
- Holme Green

- Location within Berkshire
- OS grid reference: SU827672
- Civil parish: Wokingham Without
- Unitary authority: Wokingham
- Ceremonial county: Berkshire
- Region: South East
- Country: England
- Sovereign state: United Kingdom
- Post town: WOKINGHAM
- Postcode district: RG40
- Dialling code: 0118
- Police: Thames Valley
- Fire: Royal Berkshire
- Ambulance: South Central
- UK Parliament: Berkshire

Holme Green is a hamlet in the civil parish of Wokingham Without, in the Wokingham district, in the ceremonial county of Berkshire, England.

The settlement lies surrounded by farmland between Wokingham and Crowthorne, and is located 1.5 miles (2.4 km) south-east of Wokingham.
