= Bonita Norris =

British mountain climber

Bonita Norris (born 1987) is best known for becoming the youngest British woman to reach the summit of Mount Everest at the age of 22 from May 2010 until May 2012, when her record was broken by Leanna Shuttleworth, aged 19.

In 2011 Bonita climbed Ama Dablam with Lhakpa Wongchu Sherpa and in 2012, Bonita returned to the Himalayas for her fifth expedition, to attempt Lhotse, the world's fourth-highest mountain. She successfully summited on 28 May 2012, becoming the third British woman to do so. In 2016, Bonita attempted to climb the world's second-highest peak, K2 in Pakistan, but was unsuccessful.

== Notable expeditions and climbs ==
- Manaslu fore summit, 8163m (2009)
- Mount Everest, 8848m (2010)
- Last-degree ski expedition to the geographic North Pole (2011)
- Ama Dablam, 6812m (2011)
- Mount Kilimanjaro, 5995m (2011)
- Imja Tse (Island Peak), 6189m (2012)
- Mount Kilimanjaro, 5995m (2012)
- Lhotse, 8516m (2012)

== Books ==
In 2017, Bonita published her memoir, The Girl Who Climbed Everest, in hardback by Hodder & Stoughton. The paperback version reached number 1 in the Amazon Mountaineering book chart in 2022.

== Personal life ==
Bonita attended The Holt School, located in Wokingham, Berkshire, England. She went on to study at Royal Holloway, University of London, graduating in 2009 with a BA Media Arts.

Bonita has two children and lives in London with her husband, the former competition climber, Adrian Baxter.

== See also ==
- Leanna Shuttleworth
