= Oakbank =

Oakbank may refer to:

== Places ==
- Oakbank, Manitoba, Canada
- Oakbank, Mull, a place on the Isle of Mull, Argyll and Bute, Scotland
- Oakbank, Perth, Perth and Kinross, Scotland
- Oakbank, West Lothian, a location in Scotland
- Oakbank, South Australia, Australia

== Other uses ==
- Oakbank Easter Racing Carnival, held in Oakbank, South Australia

== See also ==
- Oakbank School (disambiguation)
