= Danegrove Primary School =

Location
- Windsor Drive; East Barnet; London, EN4 8UD; England
- Coordinates: 51.644°N 0.159°W

Information
- Type: Community school
- Local authority: Barnet
- Department for Education URN: 101314 Tables
- Ofsted: Reports
- Gender: Co-educational
- Age: 5 to 11
- Website: www.danegroveschool.co.uk

Danegrove Primary School, formerly Littlegrove Mixed School and Oakland School, is a primary school in East Barnet in north London. It is on two sites, Ridgeway Avenue and Windsor Drive. The school buildings at Ridgeway Avenue, which joins Daneland, are grade II listed with Historic England.

== History ==
=== Ridgeway Avenue ===
The school at Ridgeway Avenue was constructed in 1949–50 to a design by the Architects' Co-Partnership using a steel frame and precast concrete panels and coloured panel infill. It used a Hills 8' 3" system as specified by Hertfordshire County Council. The assembly hall includes an important mural by Fred Millett, now covered, who also designed for London Transport.

=== Windsor Drive ===
The Windsor Drive school, originally known as Littlegrove Mixed School, was opened in August 1933.

== See also ==
- Little Grove
