= List of King George V Playing Fields in Berkshire =

Berkshire
Location	Formal name	Local name (if any)	National Grid Reference	Dates		External links
Location	Formal name	Local name (if any)	National Grid Reference	Purchase	Opening	External links
Farley Hill	King George's Field		SU752645	1938		
Sonning	King George's Field		SU758751			Commons image
Twyford	King George's Field	The Recreation Ground	SU787765	1939		Sport, Club, Shop, Sports, Centre in the Twyford area
Winkfield	King George V Playing Field		SU897711	1937		Commons image
Wokingham	King George's Field		SU819685	1973		
