= Nancy Sandars =

British archaeologist and prehistorian

Nancy Sandars FSA FBA
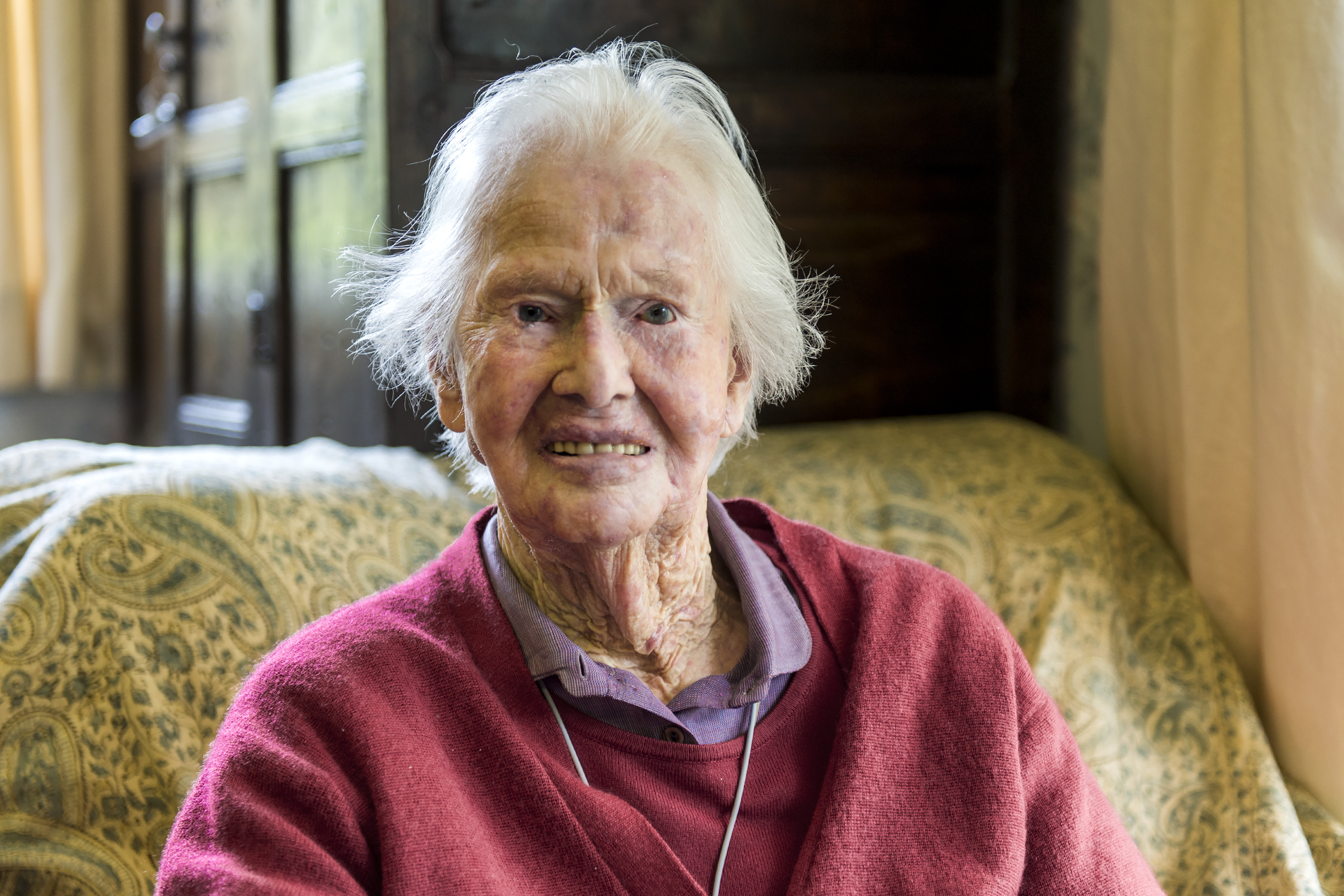
- Sandars in June 2013
- Born: Nancy Katharine Sandars; 29 June 1914; Little Tew, Oxfordshire, England
- Died: 20 November 2015 (aged 101)
- Other name: N. K. Sandars
- Awards: Fellow of the Society of Antiquaries of London (1957); Fellow of the British Academy (1984)

Academic background
- Education: University of London; St Hugh's College, Oxford (BLitt)
- Thesis: Bronze Age Cultures in France

Academic work
- Discipline: Archaeology; Prehistory
- Sub-discipline: Bronze Age Europe; Ancient Near East
- Website: http://www.nancysandars.org.uk

Nancy Katharine Sandars FSA FBA (29 June 1914 – 20 November 2015) was a British archaeologist and prehistorian. As an independent scholar, she wrote a number of books and a popular version of the Epic of Gilgamesh.

== Early life and education ==
Sandars was born on 29 June 1914 in The Manor House, Little Tew, Oxfordshire, England. Her parents were Lieutenant-Colonel Edward Sandars and Gertrude Sandars (née Phipps). Her father was a British Army officer who had served in the Boer War and during the First World War, and her mother served with the Voluntary Aid Detachment. Through her mother, she was a descendant of James Ramsay, the 18th Century anti-slavery campaigner.

Sandars was educated at home by a governess up to the age of twelve. She was then educated at Luckley School, then an all-girls independent school in Berkshire, and then at Wychwood School, an all-girls independent school in Oxford. She was a sickly child, ill with tuberculosis; this had affected her eyes, but she was successfully treated at a sanatorium in Switzerland. As her education was interrupted by illness, she left school without any qualifications.

From 1930 to 1937, Sandars travelled extensively throughout western Europe: she visited Germany, France, Italy, Switzerland, Austria, and Spain. She frequently visited "Die Klause", a German language school for British students based in Jugenheim, which had already been attended by Betty, her older sister and Oxford University student. She was in Austria with her mother during the events of the February Uprising, before they escaped to Budapest and then to England. Her mother died in June 1934. She was travelling in Spain in 1936, shortly before the start of the Spanish Civil War. Her travels ended in 1936 or 1937, and she established herself in the United Kingdom.

== Career ==
=== Early archaeological career ===
Sandars took part in her first archaeological excavation in the 1930s after her sister had introduced her to Kathleen Kenyon. In 1939, Nancy joined Kenyon to work at her excavation of an Iron Age hill fort at The Wrekin, Shropshire. She had also been planning to join an excavation in Normandy run by Mortimer Wheeler, but was stopped by the outbreak of World War II. Instead, she went to London with Kenyon and assisted in the moving of artefacts at the Institute of Archaeology into its basement for protection.

I remember I stood at the top of the stairs and threw pots and sherds to Kath standing at the bottom to put them in packing cases. She was a good catcher and I don’t think there were any casualties.

— Sandars describing the moving of artefacts at the Institute of Archaeology during WW2

=== War service ===
Sandars began World War II as a pacifist; she had been influenced by the poetry of Wilfred Owen and her memories of World War I. For the first few months of the war, she was a volunteer nurse at various hospitals in Oxfordshire.

Sandars's attitudes changed after experiencing The Blitz, and after the Fall of France in June 1940. Following this change of perspective, she joined the Mechanised Transport Corps and became a motorcycle despatch rider. Because of blackout restrictions, the bike's lights were hooded and only emitted a small bead of light. Combined with the British weather, this could make riding a motorcycle at night treacherous. One time, Sandars crashed into a ditch, having mistaken a T-junction for a crossroads while riding almost blind. Another time, torrential rain made her engine short-circuited, shocking her, causing the bike to skid, and leaving her pinned under the wreckage; she was rescued by a passing fireman. The uniforms were inadequate, providing neither warmth not waterproofing; she would regularly offer soldiers pillion lifts so as to benefit from their body warmth. The women riders were not provided with helmets until Sandars' father protested to the Ministry of Home Affairs; they were then swiftly issued to all riders.

In 1942, she applied to and was accepted by the Women's Royal Naval Service (WRNS). Fluent in German, she was assigned to the Y service of the Government Code and Cypher School at Bletchley Park. Following training, she was posted to listening posts across the south coast of England: to Looe, Cornwall from September to November 1943; to Lyme Regis, Dorset from November 1943 to February 1944; and finally to Abbotscliffe, between Dover and Folkestone in Kent from February to August 1944. She was posted to Abbotscliffe during the D-day (6 June 1944) landings across the English Channel. Her role as a wireless operator was to listen to intercepted radio transmissions from German E-Boats and aircraft within 30 miles of the British coastline. Working in tandem with other listening stations, they also used direction finding to establish the location of the enemy vessels. In one instance, she was listening in on a debate between German pilots as to whether or not to bomb the building in which she was stationed; they decided to save their bombs for London.

Sandars ended the war in the rank of petty officer, and was later added to the Bletchley Park Roll of Honour.

=== Post-war ===
After the end of World War II, Sandars decided to attend university. With no school qualifications, she had to take the "London Matric"; she passed and was therefore qualified for study at the University of London. In 1947, she entered the Institute of Archaeology to study for a postgraduate diploma in Western European archaeology. The course covered the Palaeolithic, and Iron Age periods, and also the archaeology of the Celts. The diploma took her three years to complete because of periods of illness.

From 1946 to 1948, Sandars, Richard J. C. Atkinson and Peggy Piggott, were involved in rescue excavations in Dorchester, revealing a number of previously unknown Neolithic monuments. By Easter 1948, the area had been overtaken by gravel-working. They used areal survey and the first instance of applying a resistivity survey to prehistoric monuments. The excavation was praised for using the "most modern methods" and for publishing "a document of permanent value which reflects great credit on the authors, each of whom played a leading part in the actual field investigations".

Sandars spent a year at the British School at Athens. She then undertook postgraduate research at St Hugh's College, Oxford. She worked with Christopher Hawkes, the then Professor of European Prehistory. She graduated from the University of Oxford with a Bachelor of Letters (BLitt) degree. Her thesis for her BLitt was edited and became her first book, Bronze Age Cultures in France.

In 1952, Sandars travelled to Greece to work on an excavation on the island of Chios. This dig was led by Sinclair Hood; Sandars and Hood had studied together, with both being at the Institute of Archaeology in 1947.

As part of her research, Sandars undertook a number of trips exploring archaeological sites throughout Europe. In 1954, she toured Greece, visiting Athens and Crete. In 1958, she once more toured Greece and also Turkey as part of research into the Aegean Bronze Age; she was accompanied by the anthropologist John Campbell and classical archaeologist Dorothea Gray. In 1960, she travelled to Romania and Bulgaria with Stuart Piggott, Terence Powell and John Cowen. She had received a grant from St Hugh's College, Oxford (her alma mater) to research the European Neolithic. As these countries were behind the Iron Curtain which few Western Europeans had been able to cross, she was required to report to the Foreign Office when she returned to England.

Sandars wrote a prose rendition of Epic of Gilgamesh that was published by Penguin Books in 1960. She used scholarly translations from the Akkadian by A. Heidel and E. A. Speiser and from the Sumerian by S. N. Kramer. Her version proved very popular and sold over one million copies.

Sandars continued her travels and research tours across Europe and the Middle East, visiting sites and museums. She published Prehistoric Art in Europe in the Pelican History of Art series in 1967, in which she rejected religious interpretations for cave art and championed an approach that instead focused on nature and illusion. Her research interests moved to the second millennium BC, and she published Sea-Peoples: warriors of the ancient Mediterranean in 1978, looking at the Sea Peoples and the associated collapses of the great civilisations of the Mediterranean.

== Honours ==
On 2 May 1957, Sandars was elected a Fellow of the Society of Antiquaries of London (FSA). In 1984, she was elected a Fellow of the British Academy (FBA).

== Selected works ==
- Atkinson, R. J. C.; Piggott, C. M.; Sandars, N. K. (1951). Excavations at Dorchester, Oxon.: First Report. Oxford: Department of Antiquities, Ashmolean Museum.
- Sandars, N. K. (1957). Bronze Age Cultures in France. Cambridge: Cambridge University Press. ISBN 978-1107475427.
- Sanders, N. K. (1960). The Epic of Gilgamesh (1st ed.). Penguin Books. ISBN 978-0140441000.
- Sandars, N. K. (1971). Poems of Heaven and Hell from Ancient Mesopotamia. Harmondsworth: Penguin.
- Sandars, N. K. (1978). The Sea Peoples: warriors of the ancient Mediterranean 1250-1150 B. C. London: Thames & Hudson. ISBN 978-0500020852.
- Sandars, N. K. (1985). Prehistoric art in Europe (2nd ed.). Harmondsworth, Middlesex, England: Penguin Books. ISBN 978-0140560305.
- Sandars, N. K. (1995). Gilgamesh and Enkidu. New York, NY: Penguin Books. ISBN 978-0146001734.
- Sanders, Nancy (2001). Grandmother's steps and other poems, 1943-2000. London: Poets and Painters Press. ISBN 978-0902400689.
