= Wokingham Without =

Civil parish in Berkshire, England

Coordinates: 51.389°N 0.801°W

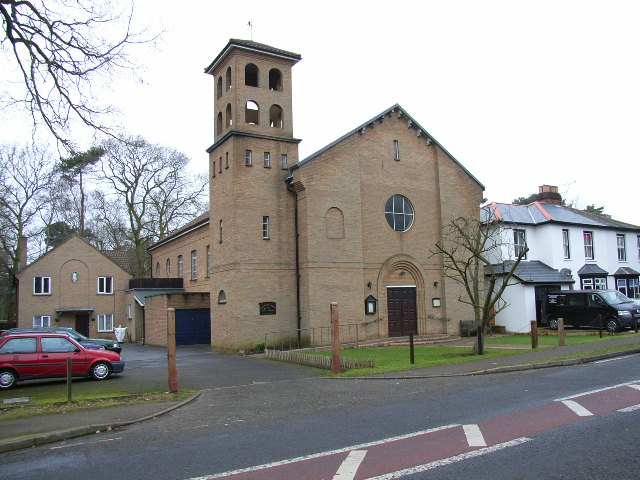
The Catholic Church of the Holy Ghost, Crowthorne

Wokingham Without is a civil parish in the Wokingham district of the English county of Berkshire. It was formed in 1894 when the parish of Wokingham was split into two parts — one rural and one urban. The population of the civil parish as of the 2011 Census is 7,011. The parish originally curved around Wokingham proper from north to south in a west-facing crescent. The area to the north is called Ashridge (anciently called Hertoke). However, in more recent years, this area has been transferred to the parish of St Nicholas Hurst.

The area to the south of Wokingham is modern Wokingham Without. It consists of the ecclesiastical parish of St. Sebastian's, formed in 1871, divided into two sections. The largely rural north includes the hamlets of Heathlands (alias St Sebastians), Holme Green and Gardeners Green. The southern end of the parish is more urbanized, and includes Ravenswood (anciently called Bigshot) and what is really an extension of the Crowthorne urban area. Ludgrove School at Wixenford is actually just in Wokingham Without, rather than Wokingham. It moved to Wixenford House in 1937. The northern part of the Parish forms a major part of a Strategic Development Location (SDL), one of four areas earmarked for intensive residential development by the Borough Council. Part of the SDL north of the Reading to Waterloo railway, originally called Buckhurst Farm but now known as Montague Park, has already been developed. This area lies outside of Wokingham Without. The area of the SDL within Wokingham Without is to be developed.
