= The Holt School =

Location
- Holt Lane; Wokingham, Berkshire, RG41 1EE; England; 51.41564°N 0.8437°W

Information
- Type: Academy
- Established: 1931
- Department for Education URN: 136880 Tables
- Ofsted: Reports
- Co-headteachers: Anne Kennedy and Katie Pearce
- Gender: Girls (mixed sixth form)
- Age: 11 to 18
- Enrolment: 1,280
- Website: www.holtschool.co.uk

The Holt School is a secondary school located on the outskirts of Wokingham, Berkshire, England, on Holt Lane. It is a girls' school and currently teaches over 1,200 girls ranging from age 11–18. Boys are admitted to the sixth form. There are eight houses: Broderers, Clothworkers, Goldsmiths, Haberdashers, Lacemakers, Spinners, Tanners and Weavers.

The school was founded in 1931, still occupies the same site, its first headmistress being G. M. Brown. It is a specialized language and science college and is in the top 100 highest achieving schools in GCSE, AS and A level exam results. The current co-headteachers are Anne Kennedy and Katie Pearce.

In June 2020, James Furlong, a 36-year-old teacher who was head of history, government, and politics at the school, was stabbed to death in the 2020 Forbury Gardens stabbings in Reading.

== Notable alumni ==
- Bonita Norris (born 1987), youngest British female to climb Mount Everest
- Celia Wade-Brown (born 1956), Mayor of Wellington, New Zealand
