= Emm Brook =

River in Berkshire, England

Coordinates: 51.4529°N 0.8762°W

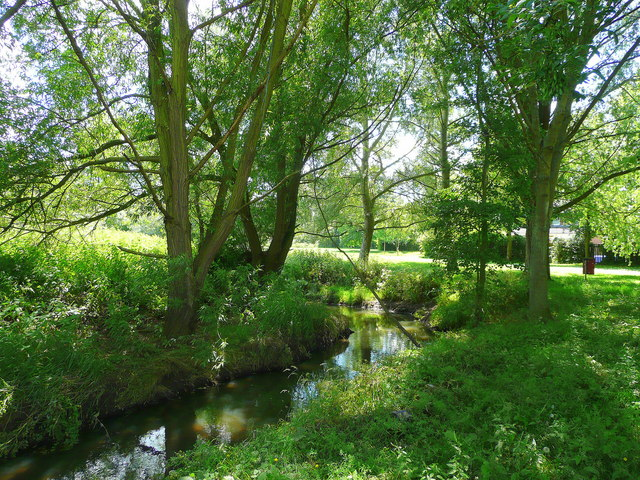
The Emm Brook view south of Toutley Bridge, Forest Road

The Emm Brook, sometimes known as the Embrook or Emmbrook, is a small river in the English county of Berkshire. It is a tributary of the River Loddon which it meets at the village of Hurst.

The Wokingham suburb of Emmbrook is named after the river.

The Emm Brook passes through Dinton Pastures Country Park, where the original route has been diverted to enable gravel extraction in the 1970s. It flows along the eastern boundary of The Emmbrook School.

On 20 July 2007 the river suffered a flash flood that breached banks at Emmbrook School, among others. It destroyed the ground floor rooms and computer suites causing them to be totally rebuilt over the summer holiday.

== Water quality ==
The Environment Agency measure water quality of the river systems in England. Each is given an overall ecological status, which may be one of five levels: high, good, moderate, poor and bad. There are several components that are used to determine this, including biological status, which looks at the quantity and varieties of invertebrates, angiosperms and fish. Chemical status, which compares the concentrations of various chemicals against known safe concentrations, is rated good or fail.

The water quality of the Emm Brook was as follows in 2019:

Section	Ecological Status	Chemical Status	Length	Catchment	Channel
Emm Brook	Moderate	Fail	14.566 km (9.051 mi)	42.421 km^{2} (16.379 sq mi)	
