= St Crispin's School =

Location
- London Road; Wokingham, Berkshire, RG40 1SS; England; 51°24′39″N 0°49′20″W

Information
- Type: Academy
- Motto: Excellence for all
- Established: 1652
- Local authority: Wokingham
- Trust: The Circle Trust
- Department for Education URN: 145286 Tables
- Ofsted: Reports
- Head teacher: Andy Hinchliff
- Gender: Coeducational
- Age: 11 to 18
- Enrolment: 1280
- Capacity: 1500
- Colours: Green and yellow
- Website: www.crispins.co.uk

St Crispin's School, founded in 1953, is a coeducational comprehensive secondary school and sixth form located in Wokingham, Berkshire, England. There were 1,164 students at the school in 2017, of whom 234 were in the Sixth form. The school is on the London Road, just outside Wokingham town centre.

== Architecture ==
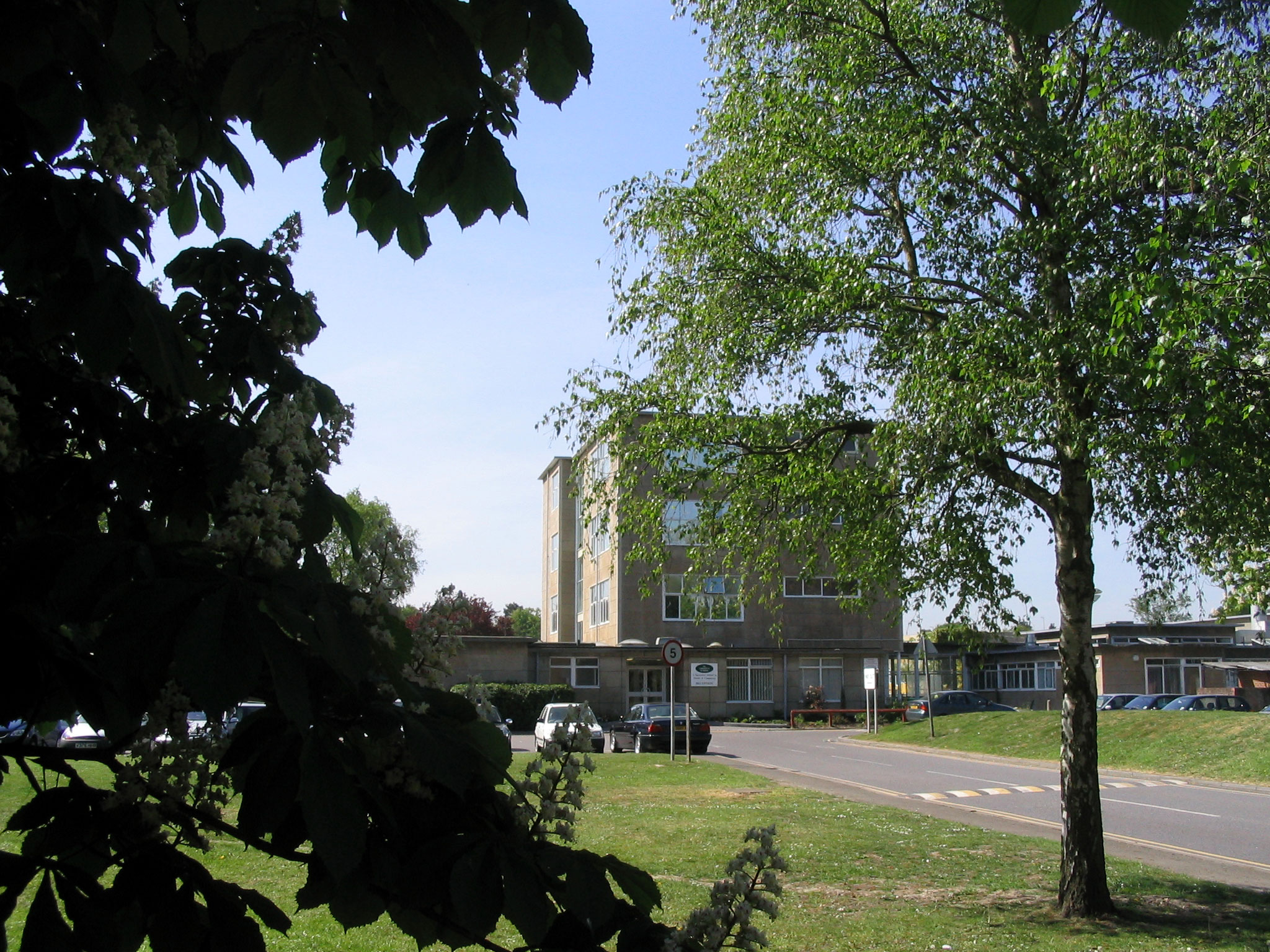
A view of St Crispin's from the London Road

St Crispin's School was the first of the Ministry of Education's prototype prefabricated schools. It was built between 1951 and 1953 by the Ministry of Education's own team of researchers into rational school building (David Medd and Mary Crowley) under the direction of S. A. W Johnson Marshall. The work was inspired by that of the Hertfordshire Architect's Department. In the post-war years, with an increasing demand for school places, the government was under pressure to reduce costs but without compromising the school building programme. The aim was to establish new levels of cost efficiency for both erection and running costs. The building is of light steel construction with components of modular sizes. The classrooms were all originally located in a four-storey block above the main entrance with a central courtyard and a rambling series of inter-connected mostly single-storey buildings which provided accommodation for a hall, a gym and specialised teaching spaces for arts and crafts. The new techniques speeded up the building process so much that the school was able to open five months ahead of the planned schedule. It is widely believed that the school tower was designed with the potential to be modified to a hospital in times of national emergency, though no records have been found to substantiate the claim. The informal layout and unassuming architecture influenced the layout and construction of schools across the country. St Crispin's was classified as a Grade II listed building by English Heritage on 30 March 1993.

The original school site consisted of 29 acres (120,000 m^{2}), of which 4 acres (16,000 m^{2}) were gardens to be tended by the students. The gardens have long gone but the school still has playing fields and also uses of the adjacent St Crispin's Sports Centre.

The artwork on the walls was a feature of the school in its early years. The composition slabs by the main entrance featured paintings of a modular girl by the mural artist Fred Millett (1920–1980). He also painted four murals depicting the seasons of the year, the most striking of which was a large mural at the east end of the dining hall depicting apple picking. These pictures were removed or painted over in a redecoration programme in the 1970s but was restored in the summer of 2011.

In 2012, work was started on building a new Science Block on the area where the current tennis courts are located. A new Multiple Use Games Area was then built in another location on the existing school field. The Music department also relocated to the area vacated by the biology department. The whole project was completed in 2013 and cost £5 million.

== History ==
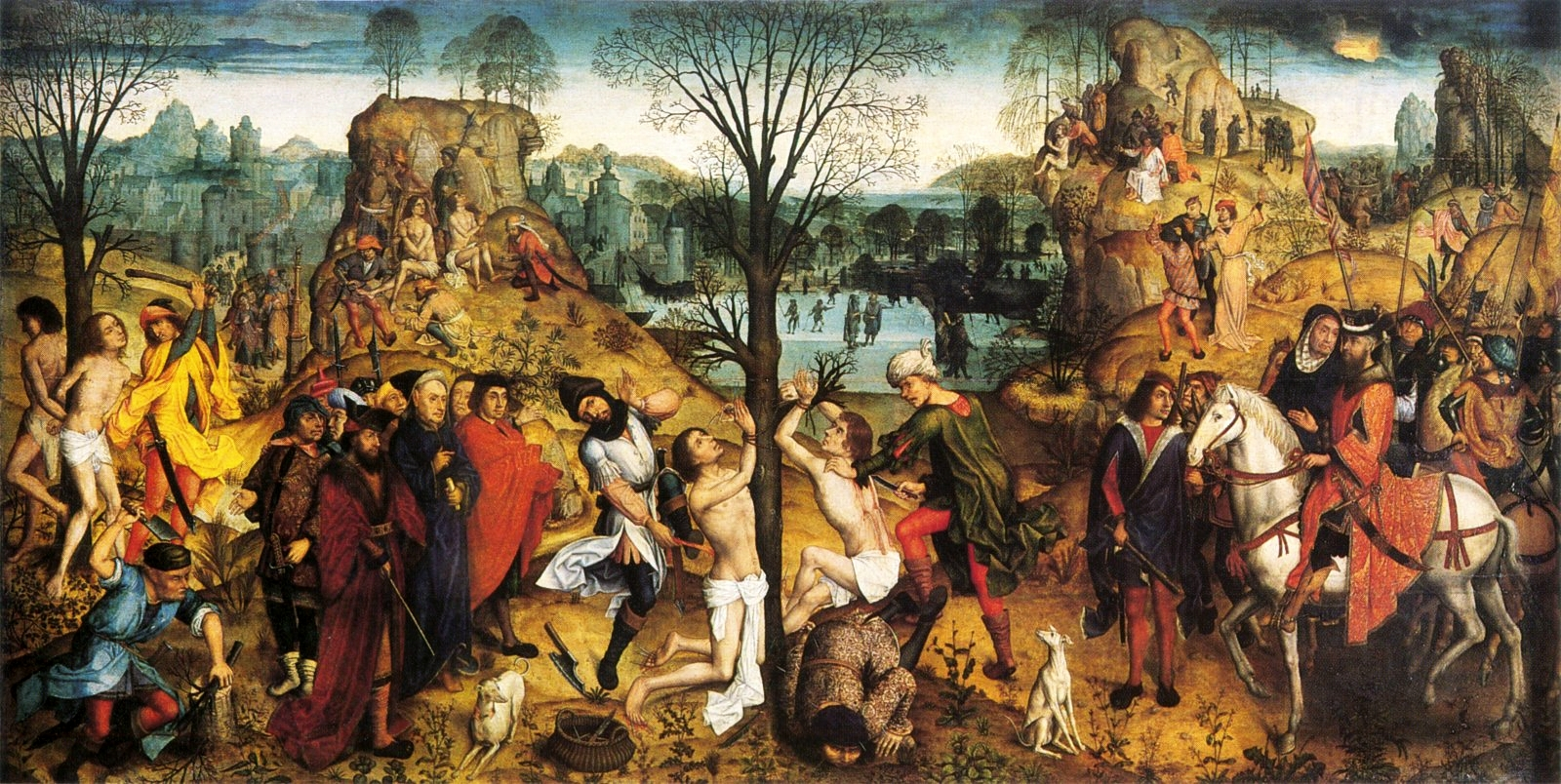
The Martyrdom of Saints Crispin and Crispinian, oil painting at Wilanów Palace in Warsaw, Poland

The school was named after St Crispin, the patron saint of cobblers, tanners and leather workers.

St Crispin's was opened on 14 October 1953 by the Right Honourable Florence Horsbrugh, the then Minister of Education. It featured in a BBC Schools Current Affairs broadcast on 16 October 1953. There were 360 pupils aged between 11 and 15 on roll on the first day with 19 members of staff. By the end of the first full academic year there were 580 pupils at the school. The numbers rose rapidly and by 1958 there were 856 pupils on roll. As of the 2006/2007 academic year, there were 1050 students at the school.

In 2003 the school celebrated its fiftieth anniversary and was featured as a "School in Focus" on the Teachernet website. In the same year the school received a substantial addition to its funds by gaining a School Achievement Award from the Department for Education and Skills.

St Crispin's was awarded specialist maths and computing status with effect from September 2004. The award was accompanied by additional government funding of £600,000 spread over four years to allow the technology to be used across all areas of the curriculum.

In July 2008 St Crispin's became the first secondary school in the Wokingham Borough to be awarded the ICT Mark from Becta, the (now-defunct) Government-funded agency for promoting ICT in schools and colleges.

In the summer term of 2008 St Crispin's was recognised as a High-Performing Specialist School by the Department for Children, Schools and Families. The status was granted as a result of the school's overall performance and, in particular, for its GCSE results and good Ofsted report. As a result of this recognition the school was invited to apply for a second specialism. A plan for a specialism in Leadership was submitted in January 2009 and approved on 14 February. The school was formally designated as a Leadership Partnership School with effect from April 2009.

In 2010 the school was inspected by Ofsted. As a result of the inspection, the school achieved the status of being an 'Outstanding' school. Later, in 2013, the school was again inspected by Ofsted and had its rating changed to 'Good'.

Previously a community school administered by Wokingham Borough Council, in February 2018 St Crispin's School converted to academy status. The school is now sponsored by The Circle Trust.

== The school in film ==
Pupils from the school have on two occasions been required to act as extras in films. In 1957 the school's playing fields were used to show scenes of a sports day in the eight-part cinema/TV thriller The Great Attraction. The shooting took place over three days and a number of pupils were used in the film.

In 1989 around 150 pupils from the school acted as extras in Back Home, a television feature film starring Hayley Mills and Hayley Carr. The film was set in an English school in 1946 and told the story of an English girl returning home after spending the war years in the US. The students were selected if they had the appropriate look for the period, and they were paid £5 each for their contribution. Bearwood House was used as the location for many of the school shots and other scenes were filmed in Midhurst in West Sussex.

== Curriculum ==
| Subject | GCSE | A level |
|---|---|---|
| Art and Design | Yes | Yes |
| Biology | Yes | Yes |
| Business Studies | Yes | Yes |
| Chemistry | Yes | Yes |
| Health and Social Care | Yes | Yes |
| Computer Science | Yes | No |
| Design and Technology | Yes | Yes |
| Drama | Yes | Yes |
| Economics | - | Yes |
| English Language | Yes | - |
| English Literature | Yes | Yes |
| French | Yes | Yes |
| Further Mathematics | - | Yes |
| General Studies | Yes | - |
| Geography | Yes | Yes |
| German | Yes | Yes |
| History | Yes | Yes |
| ICT | Yes | - |
| Mathematics | Yes | Yes |
| Media Studies | - | Yes |
| Music | Yes | Yes |
| Psychology | - | Yes |
| Physical Education | Yes | Yes |
| Physics | Yes | Yes |
| Religious Education | Yes | Yes |
| Science (double award) | Yes | - |
| Sociology | - | Yes |
| Spanish | Yes | Yes |
| Statistics | Yes | - |

In Years 7, 8 and 9 (Key Stage 3) students study the core subjects of English, Mathematics and Science plus the following foundation subjects: French, Design and Technology, Information and Communication Technology (ICT), History, Geography, Religious Education, Art, Music and Physical Education. In addition lessons are offered in Personal, Social and Health Education, Citizenship and Drama. Pupils are taught in sets for English, Maths, Science and French. German is offered as a second foreign language from Year 8 onwards to those in the top French sets.

The subjects offered at GCSE are shown in the table (right). St Crispin's is one of a small number of state schools which still offer the three separate sciences at GCSE. The following Design and Technology options are offered at GCSE: Food and Nutrition; Graphic Products; Resistant Materials; Systems and Control; Textiles.

The subjects offered at A level are also shown in the table (right). St Crispin's participates in the Cisco Networking Academy Programme and is one of the relatively few schools in the UK to offer this course in networking. Pupils on this course have networked the computers in the school's IT suite and also those of the neighbouring primary school, Westende.

St Crispin's has a science buddy scheme, which was featured on Teachernet, the website for teachers and educators. The scheme involved around 30 pupils from the top three sets in Year 11 helping the younger children in Year 7 to conduct experiments and investigations in a lunchtime club. The buddies also visited local primary schools during National Science Week and led practical sessions with Year 5 and Year 6 pupils.

=== Sports ===
Pupils at the school participate in the following sports: athletics, badminton, basketball, cricket, football, health-related fitness, hockey, netball, rounders, rugby, tennis and trampolining. There are school teams which play regular fixtures with other local schools in rugby, football, hockey, netball and basketball. Pupils also participate in the Reading Cross Country League. A number of pupils play at county level.

== Extracurricular activities ==
=== Competitions ===
Pupils participate in the Economics Challenge, Young Enterprise, the British Mathematical Olympiad, and the Wokingham Schools' Debating Competition. In 2004 St Crispin's School were the winners of the John Redwood Cup in the inaugural Wokingham Schools' Debating Competition. In 2014, St Crispin's went through to the national finals of Mock Trial Competition and were one of the two schools that represented Berkshire in the national finals, held in Birmingham.

=== School clubs ===
A range of clubs are available both at lunchtime and after school. There are clubs for music, drama, dance, art, Warhammer, various sports, computing (including a computer club specifically for girls) and Christian Union.

== Achievements and specialisms ==
St Crispin's is a specialist school in mathematics and computing and a Leadership Partnership School. It is both a Microsoft Academy and a Cisco Systems Networking Academy. The school has Investor in People Status and also holds the Sportsmark Award and the ICT Mark. St Crispin's has strong links with the local community and has a special link with Costain through its building awareness programme. The school celebrated its best ever GCSE results in 2011 with 89.1% of pupils achieving five or more passes at grades A* to C and 74.5% receiving five or more grades A* to C including maths and English. At A level 51% of papers were awarded an A*-B grade.

== Admissions ==
In common with all other schools in Wokingham Borough, school places are allocated by the LEA based on designated catchment areas and feeder primary schools. Around 190 places are available at St Crispin's every year. The feeder primary schools for St Crispin's are:

- Gorse Ride Junior School
- Hatch Ride Primary School
- Keep Hatch Primary School
- Nine Mile Ride Primary School
- Oaklands Junior School
- All Saints Primary School
- St Theresa's Primary School
- Bearwood Primary School
- Westende Junior School
- St Sebastian's Church of England School

In addition the school receives a significant number of students from the primary schools in Bracknell Forest Authority. The 2006 intake was made up of 180 students from 26 different primary schools.

== Headteachers ==
- 1953-1971: Eric Bancroft
- 1972-1992: John Cole
- 1992-2012: Alex Biddle
- 2013-2022: Ginny Rhodes

As of 2024, the headteacher is Railton Blyth.

== Notable alumni ==
- Luke Bedford, composer
- Rob Bloomfield, producer and drummer in Does It Offend You, Yeah?
- Stephen Hughes, footballer
- Peter Lewington, Berkshire and Warwickshire cricketer
- Robert Dickie, footballer
- Meg Bellamy, actress
- Reece Smith, footballer
