= Epynt Way =

Long-distance path in Powys, Wales

Coordinates: 52.117°N 3.500°W

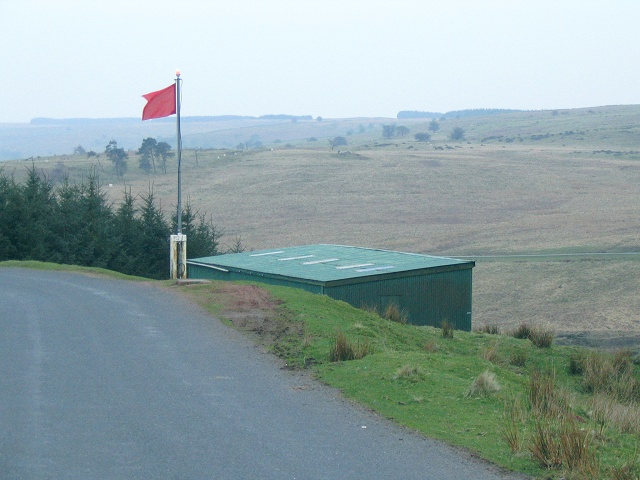
Sennybridge training area with warning flag flying

The Epynt Way is a long-distance path created by the Ministry of Defence in 2004 around the perimeter of its 'Sennybridge Training Area (SENTA)' and artillery range on Mynydd Epynt in Powys, Wales. There is, understandably, virtually no public access across the land used by the MoD, pre-existing public rights of way and public roads having been closed, with only one or two exceptions. The establishment of the Epynt Way, section by section in recent years has gone some way to compensating for that reduction in public access across the area.

== Route ==
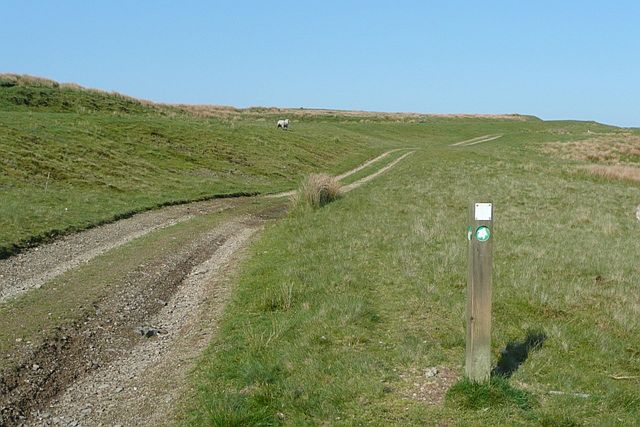
On the Epynt Way, the old moorland track, below the new army road

The circular route which is described as a permissive bridleway is 75 km / 49 mi in total length and available to walkers, cyclists and horseriders. It travels around the edge of the plateau, and keeps clear of MOD firing ranges. Nearest towns are Brecon to the south and Llandovery to the west, with Llangammarch Wells to the north. A leaflet and map can be downloaded from the Defence Estates website. It is covered by Ordnance Survey Explorer maps 187 'Llandovery' and 188 'Builth Wells'. Further information about the Epynt Way is displayed at The Epynt Visitor Centre, an interpretive centre beside the B4519 road north of Upper Chapel which was refurbished in 2009. There is a short (~1.5 miles) circular walk from the Visitor Centre which gives a taster of the main Epynt Way route.

Being in an upland area it contains steep and boggy sections that require extra care. Poor weather also demands extra awareness of route finding, especially in mist and fog as well as precipitation such as rain and snow. The route is waymarked throughout with 1.2 metre posts and finger posts at junctions with external paths, but local large-scale maps such as the OS Explorer map series should be used for information. Note however that the Epynt Way is not marked on OS maps, but there are detailed maps on the website of the Epynt Way Association ( or see External links below).
