= Oakbank School, Aberdeen =

Coordinates: 57°8′55″N 2°8′23″W

Oakbank School
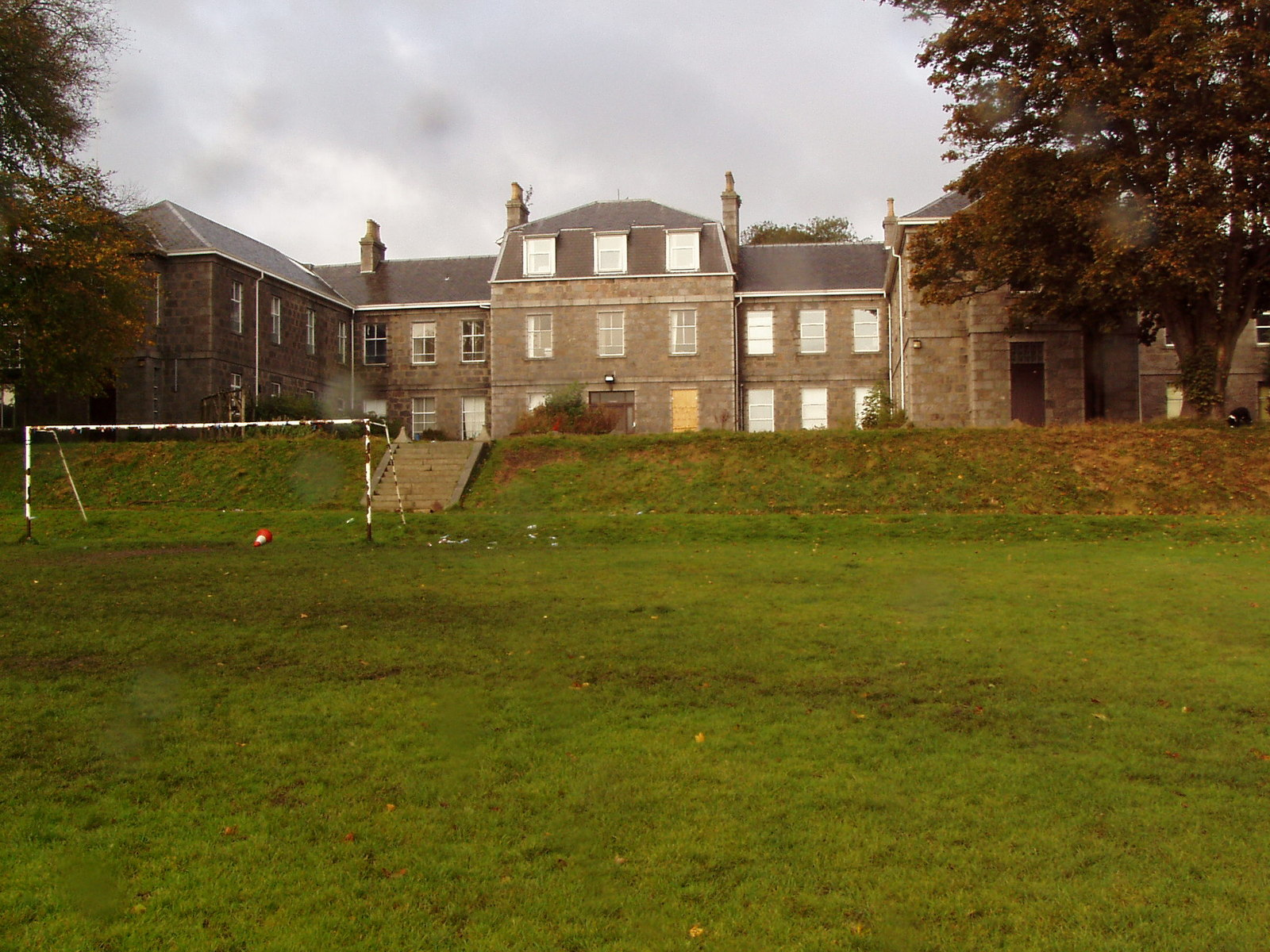
- The front of the school building in 2010, after its closure.

Location
- Mid Stocket Road; Aberdeen, AB15 5XP; Scotland

Information
- Type: Independent school
- Established: 1882
- Closed: 2008
- Local authority: Aberdeen City Council

Oakbank School was an independent residential school in Aberdeen, Scotland that offered residential education to young people with behavioural difficulties.

Formerly categorised as an approved school, it was the main institution of its kind for the North of Scotland. In 2007 it celebrated its 125th anniversary. In 2008, around 100 staff were made redundant when the school was forced to close because of debts. Developer Carlton Rock bought the site of the former school for £7 million, and 100 new homes were built. All the school buildings on the site were demolished apart from the governor's house to the north of the main building.
