= Mynydd Epynt =

Upland region of Mid Wales

Coordinates: 52°06′22″N 3°31′06″W

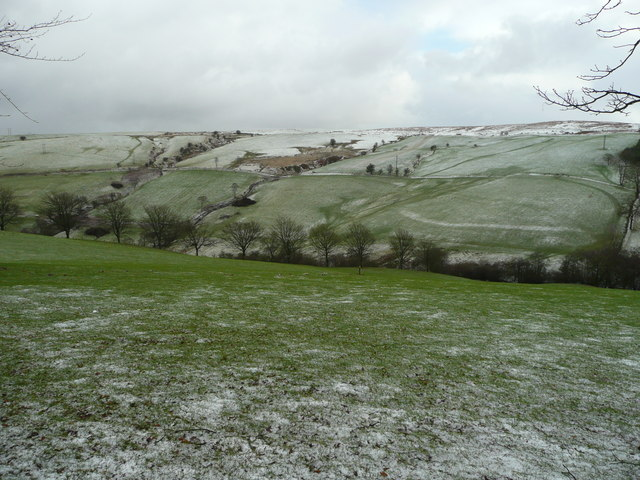
- View east from Blaen Bwch Farm

- Location within Powys
- OS grid reference: SN 961464
- Principal area: Powys
- Preserved county: Powys
- Country: Wales
- Sovereign state: United Kingdom
- Police: Dyfed-Powys
- Fire: Mid and West Wales
- Ambulance: Welsh

Mynydd Epynt (Welsh: [ˈmənɨð ˈɛpɨnt]) is an upland region of Mid Wales, within the county of Powys. It is bounded on the south by the upper stretch of the Usk Valley, on the north by the Irfon Valley, and on the east by the Wye Valley. Its western boundary is less distinct but lies east of the A483 Llandovery to Llanwrtyd Wells road.

The area is an extensive plateau lying between 400 and 450 metres (1,300 and 1,500 ft), drained by several southward-flowing rivers that empty into the River Usk; these include (from west to east) the Cilieni, the Nant Bran, the Afon Ysgir (with its two headwaters, the Ysgir Fechan and Ysgir Fawr) and the Afon Honddu. The Duhonw drains north-eastward into the River Wye. The highest point is a marilyn (having topographic prominence of at least 150 m (490 ft)) of 478 m (1,568 ft).

Since 1940, Mynydd Epynt has formed part of the Sennybridge Training Area, the largest military training zone in Wales.

== Etymology ==
The name of the area is often given as Mynydd Eppynt or Eppynt in historical sources and it appears under this spelling in the 1911 Encyclopædia Britannica.

Mynydd is the Welsh word for "mountain" or "upland area" but the meaning of Epynt is less certain. The most commonly stated etymology is "a pathway for horses", deriving from the P-Celtic root epos, meaning "horse" (as in ebol, meaning "a foal" in Modern Welsh). However, Thomas Morgan suggested the name may be interpreted as a place where "the way (referring to the ancient mountain trackway) rises abruptly", deriving from eb- ("an issuing out") and -hynt (a "way" or "course"). A ridge continuing south-west from Mynydd Epynt is known as Mynydd Bwlch-y-groes, which may be translated as "mountain at the cross-road pass" or else "mountain at the pass of the cross".

These etymologies all suggest that the area was known since ancient times as a place where important upland routes intersected, routes still largely extant in the modern era as drovers' roads.

== Geology ==
Mynydd Epynt is largely formed from the Raglan Mudstone Formation and the St Maughans Formation of the Old Red Sandstone laid down during the latest part of the Silurian period and the succeeding Devonian period though there is little in the way of rock exposures at the surface. The northern and western escarpment of Mynydd Epynt is formed from a suite of rocks assigned to the Ludlow stage of the late Silurian and which include the Temeside Mudstone, the Tilestones, the Cae'r Mynach, Fibua, Aberedw, Cwm Craig Ddu and Irfon Formations. These consist variously of sandstones, mudstones and siltstones.

There is a broken spread of glacial till across the area resulting from its inundation by ice from the mid-Wales ice sheet to the north during the ice ages and hill peat has accumulated in some areas in post-glacial times.

== History ==
=== Prehistory ===
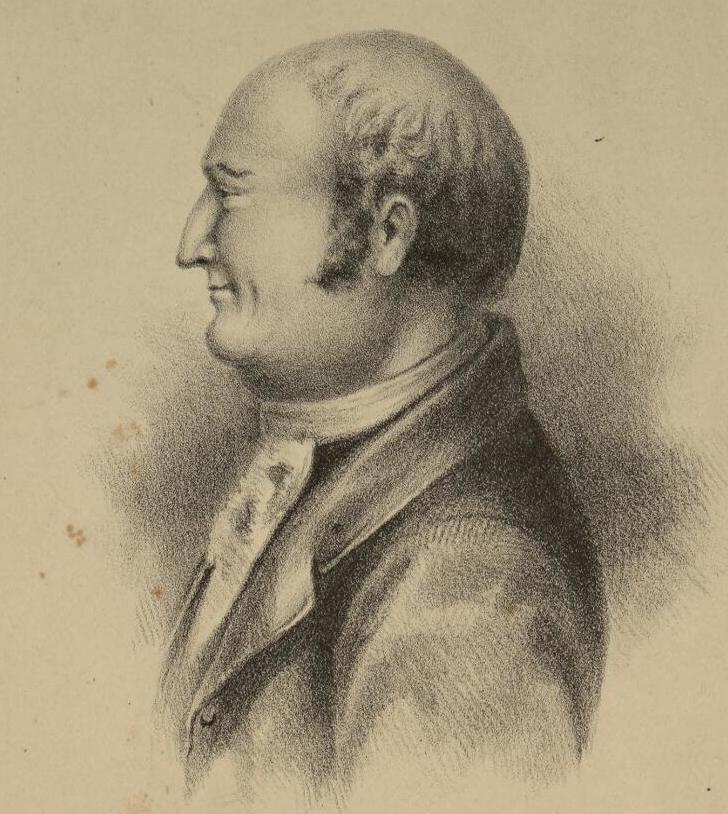
Theophilus Jones described the area of Mynydd Epynt, including its ancient monuments

The area attracted antiquarian interest from as early as 1809, when Theophilus Jones described a number of enclosures, cairns and stone circles. Modern archaeologists have surveyed the sites at Ynys Hir, Cornelau Uchaf and Twyn y Post, including what has since been described as a "prehistoric monument complex".

Many of the features on Mynydd Epynt are known to be Bronze Age in origin, but the diversity of these monuments suggest they did not share a common purpose and that there were numerous phases of construction, in different historical eras. Some of the older monuments form part of later construction areas. These older sites were either reincorporated or left undisturbed, demonstrating a continued understanding of their importance and a respect for the beliefs of previous generations and cultures. The monuments are located near the trackways that cross Mynydd Epynt, and many are positioned at crossroads.

=== Later history ===
The modern community of Mynydd Epynt was active from at least the Medieval period, with archaeological surveys detailing preserved field systems, undisturbed by modern farming methods.

The importance of the area's trackways is evidenced by the four droving inns that were established on the northern side of Mynydd Epynt (The Griffin Inn, Tafarn y Mynydd, Spite Inn and The Drover's Arms). Following the Ministry of Defence's acquisition in 1940, the Drover's Arms became an important landmark within the Sennybridge Training Area (SENTA). The inn's exterior was restored in the 1990s despite its continued use in active military training.

The inns were part of an active Welsh-speaking community, with a school, church, and numerous chapels holding regular cultural events such as Eisteddfodau and Gymanfa Ganu. A noted custom of the community was to lay out a white sheet whenever a family was in need of help; this would act as a signal to the rest of the community, who would make their way to the house and offer their assistance.

=== Expansion and developments ===
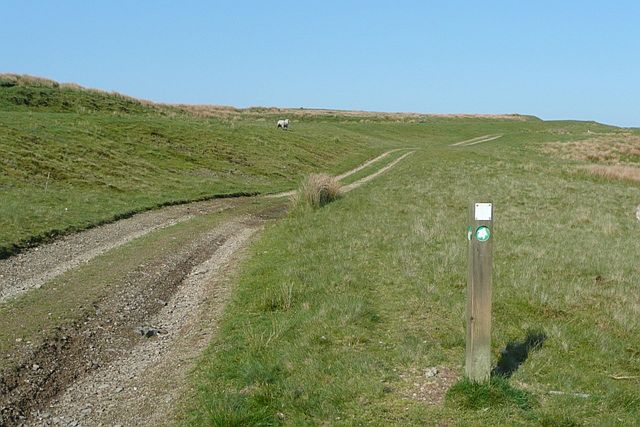
The Epynt Way path

Training operations have destroyed most of the original structures that formed the community of Mynydd Epynt, including chapels and their cemeteries. However, an artificial village was constructed in 1988. The Fighting In Built Up Areas zone (FIBUA) saw the construction of many mock buildings, including a fake chapel with imitation gravestones.

Since the 1990s, the army have expanded the SENTA area and most of Mynydd Epynt is now subject to restricted access because of the use of live ammunition and explosives. Although explosives have destroyed the agricultural land, sheep grazing continues within the area under communal grazing and letting licences.

One of the homes acquired in 1940, Disgwylfa, was refurbished in the 1990s as a conservation centre. The property was again refurbished and re-opened in 2009 as Canolfan Epynt (the Epynt Centre).

Despite the closure of the ancient trackways over Mynydd Epynt, SENTA's outlying areas continued to be Open Country or open access land. In 2004, The MOD created a long-distance path around the perimeter of the range. The Epynt Way is a circular route designed for walkers, horse riders and mountain-bikers.

The area was chosen as a special stage in the Wales Rally GB from 2006 to 2008.

== Welsh TT motorcycle races ==
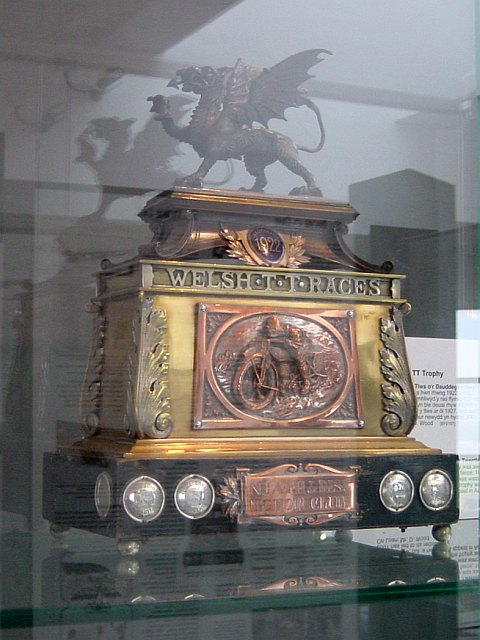
Welsh TT races Trophy, originally awarded for races on Pendine Sands, later for races held on the Epynt hard roads

From 1948 to 1953 the area was used for yearly motorcycle road racing. Announced at the Motorcycle Live show in late 2017, a new organisation, Welsh Road Race, proposed to once again organise road racing, based on a repeal of certain clauses within the UK Road Traffic Act regulations that previously banned racing on public roads in the UK. The Secretary of State for Defence granted the organisers a licence to re-use a 5.25-mile (8.45 km) circuit based on a network of private tarmacced roads contained within the Crown Estate, as was previously used to stage the historic Eppynt Motor Cycle Road Races.

The anticipated return of road racing to this area in August 2018 was cancelled in early February 2018 because of unforeseen difficulties with the Welsh Road Traffic regulations, its time-frame considered too short for the ACU-sanctioned event, and it was postponed until 2019. Unlike the Isle of Man TT races, which are free to attend, the organisers had already started to sell admission tickets via their website for the multi-category event over a long weekend.

The organisers include racer Jenny Tinmouth and former racer and TT rider Steve Plater, who also acts as a consultant development rider to Norton Motorcycles for their new V4 RR machine.

== In popular culture ==
Musician Gruff Rhys has a song called "Epynt" after the mountain, which features on his first solo album Yr Atal Genhedlaeth. The song is also about money, the E standing for the Euro, and pynt sounding similar to the Welsh word for "pound".

== See also ==
- Capel Celyn, A Welsh community evacuated for the construction of a reservoir to supply water to Liverpool and Wirral.
- Imber
- Langford, Norfolk
- Mynydd Mallaen
- Tottington, Norfolk
- Tyneham
