= Luckley House School =

Coordinates: 51°23′54″N 0°50′26″W

Location
- Luckley Road; Wokingham, Berkshire, RG40 3EU; England

Information
- Type: Coeducational Private day and boarding. All Girls day and Boarding (before September 2015)
- Religious affiliation: Church of England
- Established: 1918
- Founder: Bertha Drake
- Department for Education URN: 110136 Tables
- Interim Headmistress: Claire Gilding-Brant
- Staff: 60 teaching staff
- Gender: Mixed
- Age: 11 to 19
- Enrolment: 380
- Houses: Randle, Galloway, Cornish, Blake
- Colour: Navy
- Website: www.luckleyhouseschool.org

Luckley House School (formerly Luckley-Oakfield School) is an independent day and boarding school, located in Berkshire in England. It has a community of about 380 pupils, with about 290 in the first five-year groups, and 90 in the Sixth Form. The school is set in a rural location, south of the market town of Wokingham. The school has historically been an all girls' school but became co-educational from September 2015.

== History ==
Luckley School was founded in 1918 and has been situated on its current site in Wokingham, Berkshire since its establishment. The central building of the school, known as the main house, was constructed in 1907. This structure replaced Luckley Manor, a historic estate with roots tracing back to the Domesday Book of 1086, where it was recorded as part of the extensive landholdings documented in Berkshire. Over the centuries, Luckley Manor saw various changes in ownership and architectural modifications before its eventual replacement by the current building.

Oakfield School was founded in 1895 in the Lake District, England. Oakfield was an independent school. In 1959, the two schools were merged on the Luckley site in Wokingham, forming an independent educational trust governed by the Charity Commissioners.

Since the amalgamation, Luckley House School has continued to evolve and expand its facilities and curriculum. A significant milestone in its history came in September 2015, when the school transitioned to a fully co-educational model, welcoming both boys and girls across all year groups. The current headmistress is Claire Gilding-Brant.

== House system ==
There are four houses at Luckley: Cornish (red), Blake (blue), Galloway (green), Randle (yellow). There are house events throughout the year, which include the Sports Day, Junior and Senior Rounders, Tennis, Football, Netball, Badminton, Dance, Chess, Hockey, House Bake-Off, Reading Challenge, quiz, and the House Music Competition. Each event contributes points towards the end of year House Cup and the winners go on a House outing at the end of the summer term.

== The Whitty Theatre ==
Luckley House has its own professional working theatre, The Whitty Theatre.

== Notable former pupils ==
- Sarah Beeny – property developer, television presenter
- Nancy Sandars – British archaeologist and pre-historian
