= Ryeish Green =

Coordinates: 51.402417°N 0.96225°W

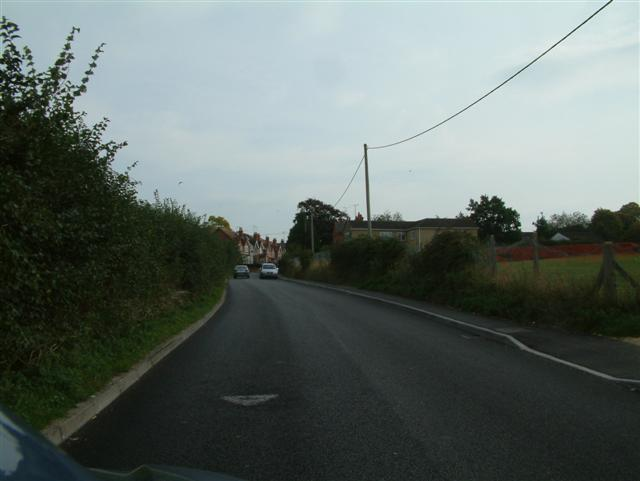
- Hyde End Lane

- Location within Berkshire
- Civil parish: Shinfield
- Unitary authority: Wokingham
- Ceremonial county: Berkshire
- Region: South East
- Country: England
- Sovereign state: United Kingdom
- Post town: Reading
- Postcode district: RG7
- Dialling code: 0118
- UK Parliament: Wokingham

Ryeish Green is a small hamlet in the civil parish of Shinfield, Berkshire, England, 4 miles (6 km) south of Reading. It is located next to Spencers Wood and sometimes considered a part of that village.

The only road in the hamlet is Hyde End Lane, which was an unnamed road until recently.

It is the location of Oakbank School. The site was previously the location of Ryeish Green School, which served as the local polling station for many years. The polling station was moved to Spencer Wood in 2008.
