= Wixenford =

Locality in Berkshire, England

Coordinates: 51.400°N 0.826°W

Wixenford is an area of the civil parish of Wokingham Without in which Ludgrove School stands. It adjoins Wokingham and is in the English county of Berkshire.

== Name ==
The area was developed by the former Wixenford School, which closed in 1934. That had been named after its first home, Wixenford House, at Eversley, in Hampshire, which itself was named by its first headmaster, Cowley Powles. He is thought to have chosen the name from the hamlet of Wixenford in Plymstock, owned by Albert Parker, 3rd Earl of Morley. Lord Morley's son Edmund was later educated at the school.
