= Oakbank School, Ryeish Green =

Coordinates: 51.4030°N 0.9645°W

Oakbank School

Location
- Hyde End Lane; Ryeish Green; Reading, Berkshire, RG7 1ER; England

Information
- Type: Free school
- Local authority: Wokingham
- Trust: Anthem Schools Trust
- Department for Education URN: 138367 Tables
- Ofsted: Reports
- Interim Headteacher: Esther Marshall
- Gender: Coeducational
- Age: 11 to 16
- Website: Official website

Oakbank Secondary Free School is a coeducational secondary school located in the hamlet of Ryeish Green (near Spencers Wood) in Berkshire, England.

== History ==
The first school on the site was Three Mile Cross Primary School, built in 1911. It originally taught pupils aged 5 to 14 years. Its first headmaster was Mr Reeley. After World War II, the school modernised, expanded and amalgamated with a school in Spencers Wood to become a senior school. The school later was renamed Ryeish Green School.

Between 2002 and 2006, the school saw a reduction of approximately 150 students. In 2007, an independent candidate stood in the local council elections running on a Save Ryeish Green School ticket. Although both Labour and Liberal candidates stood down in favour of him, he fell a few votes short of the Conservative candidate who supported the school's closure. Wokingham Borough Council closed Ryeish Green in 2010.

In September 2012, Oakbank Secondary Free School, a free school opened on the site. In 2024, the school was rated as 'inadequate' by the regulator, Ofsted. In February 2025, it was announced that the school would be transferred to a new trust as a response to the Ofsted rating.
