= Wokingham =

Market town in Berkshire, England

Coordinates: 51°24′37″N 0°50′36″W

- Market town and civil parish
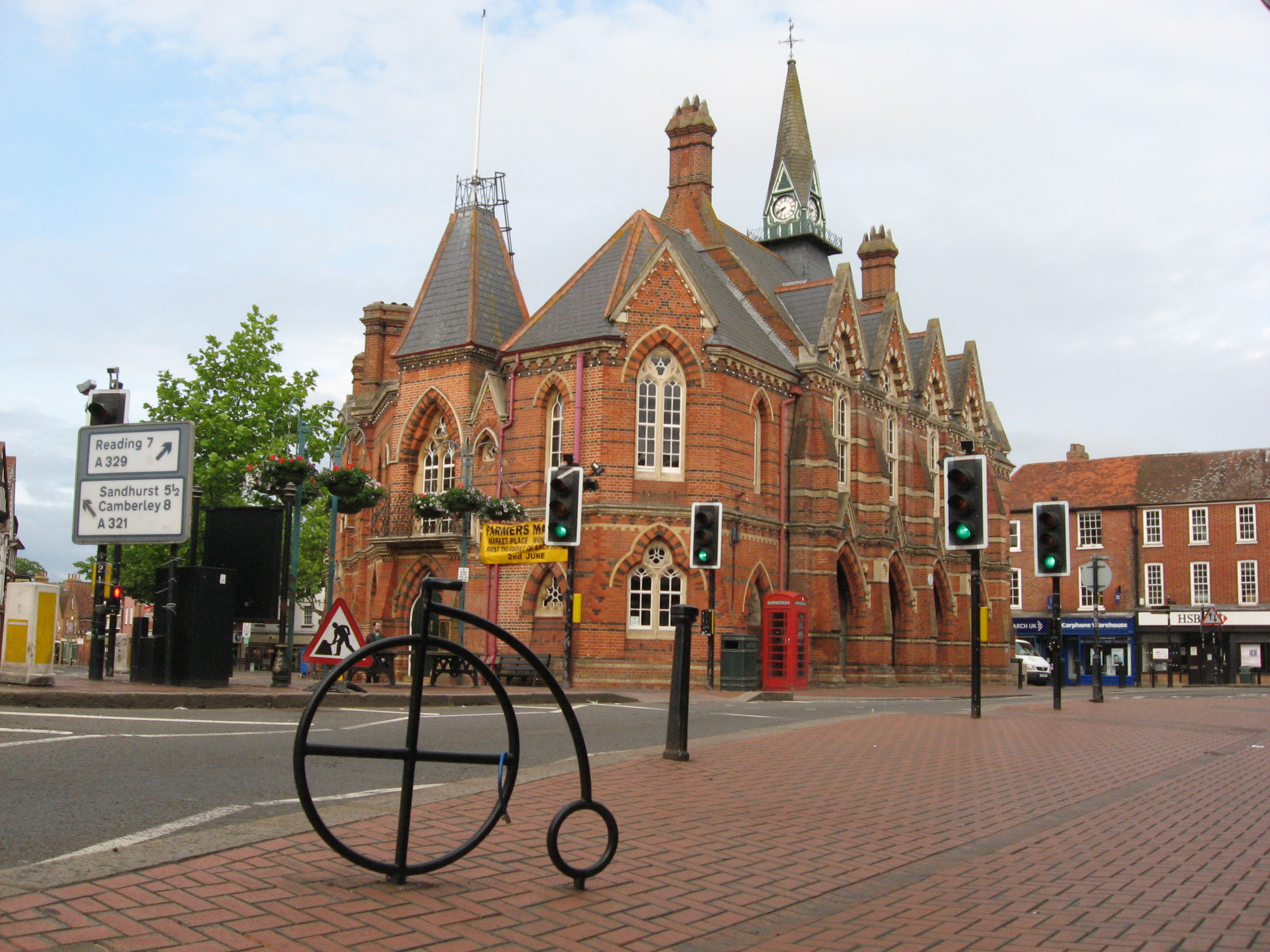
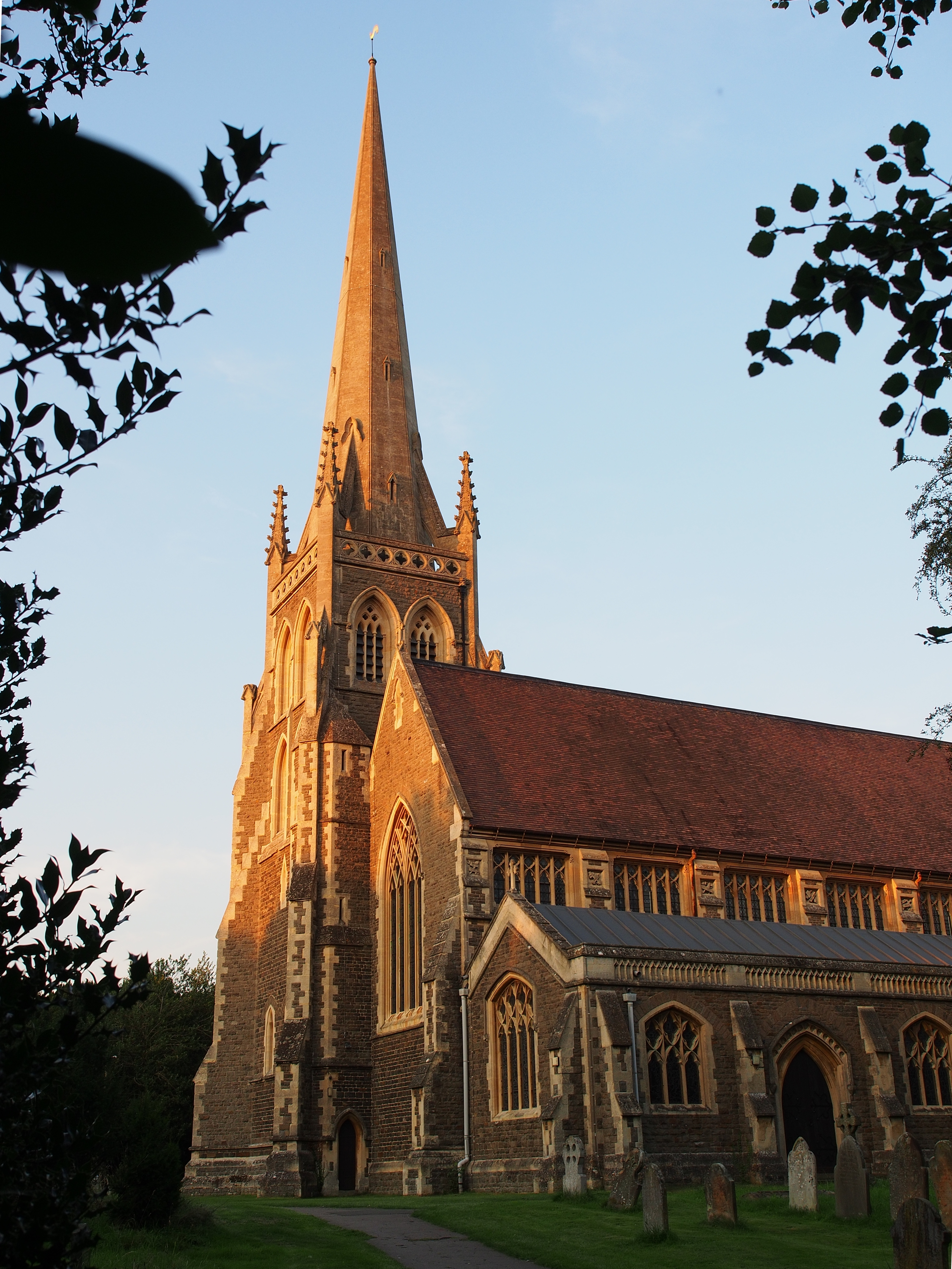
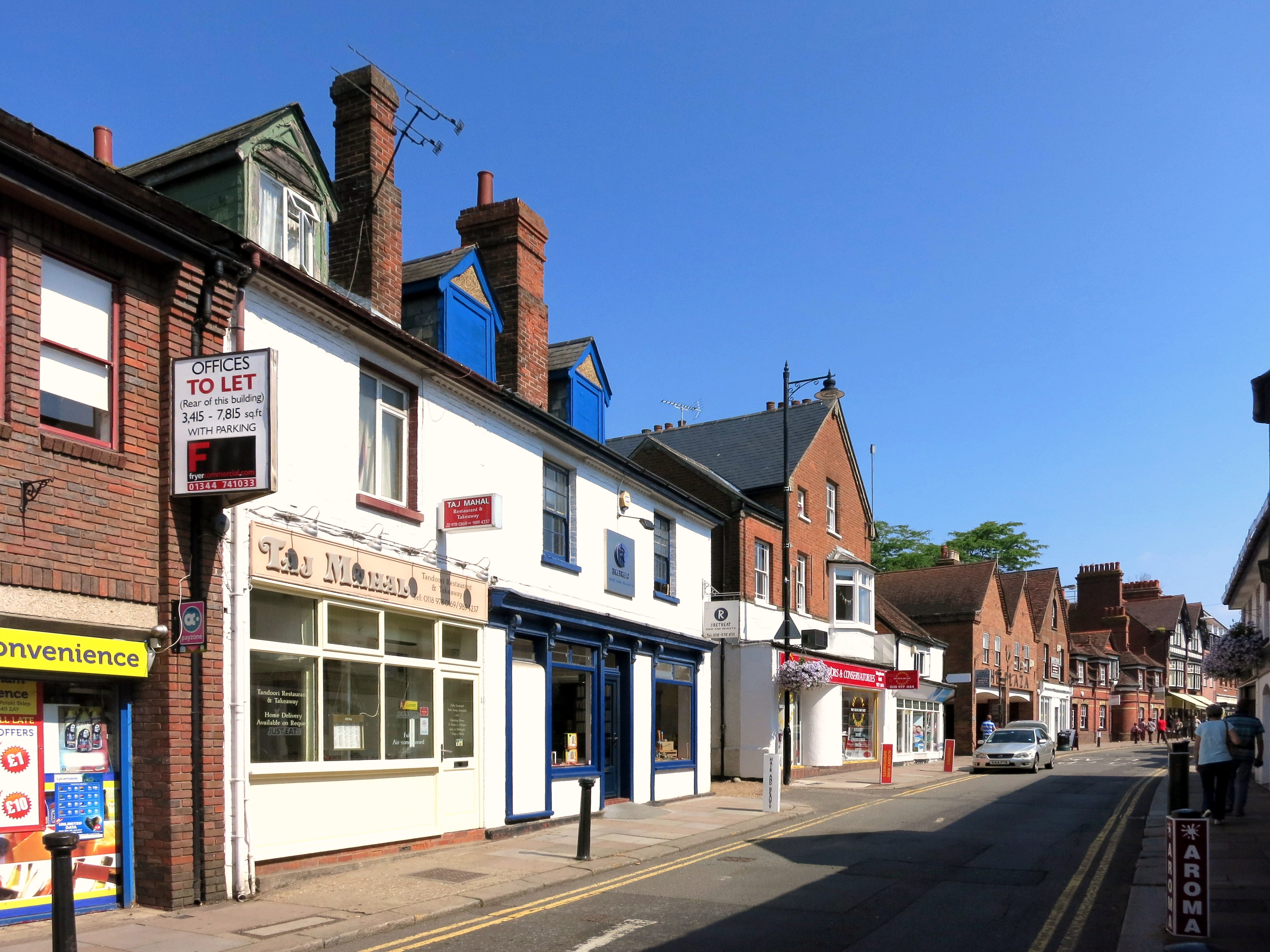
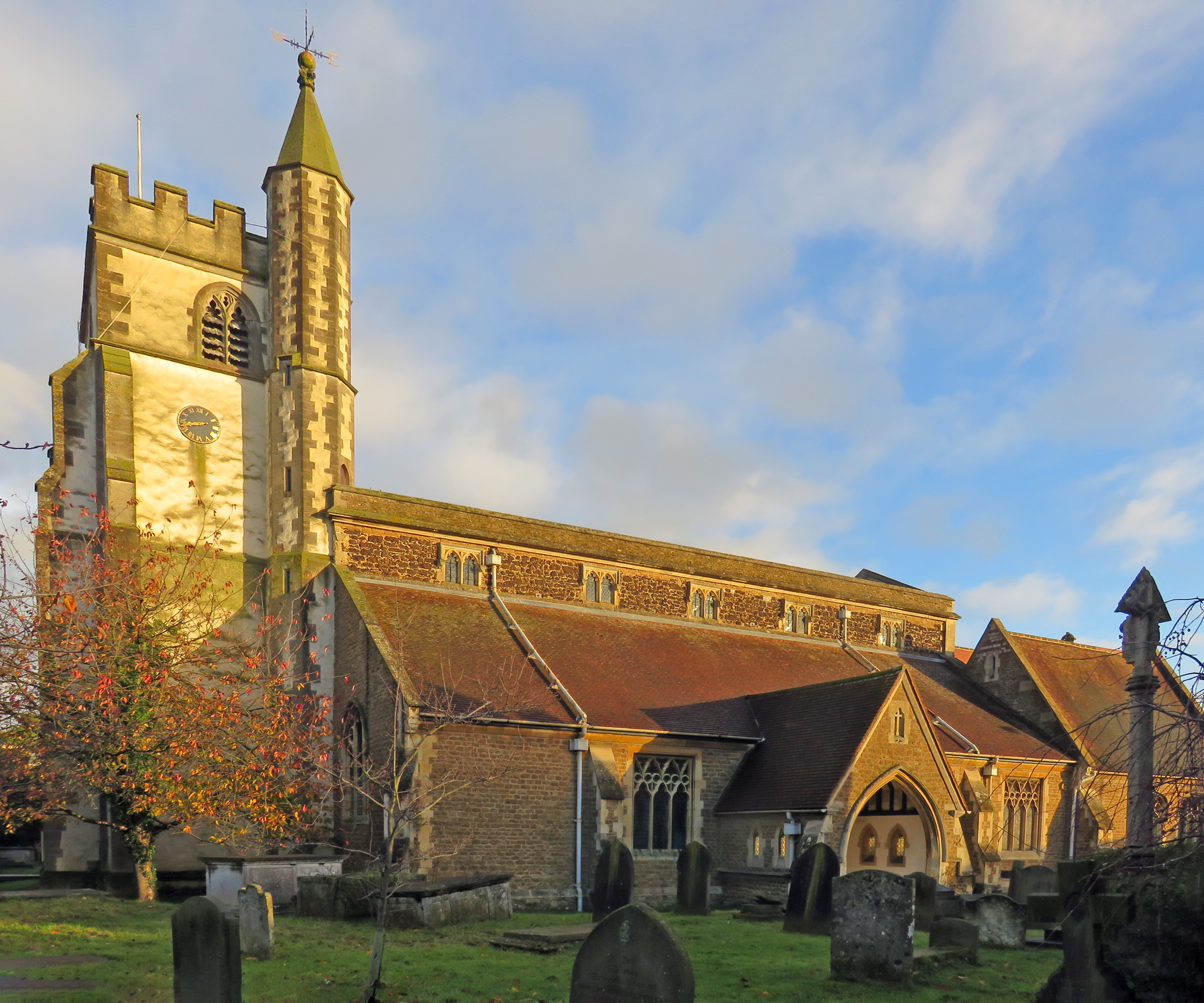
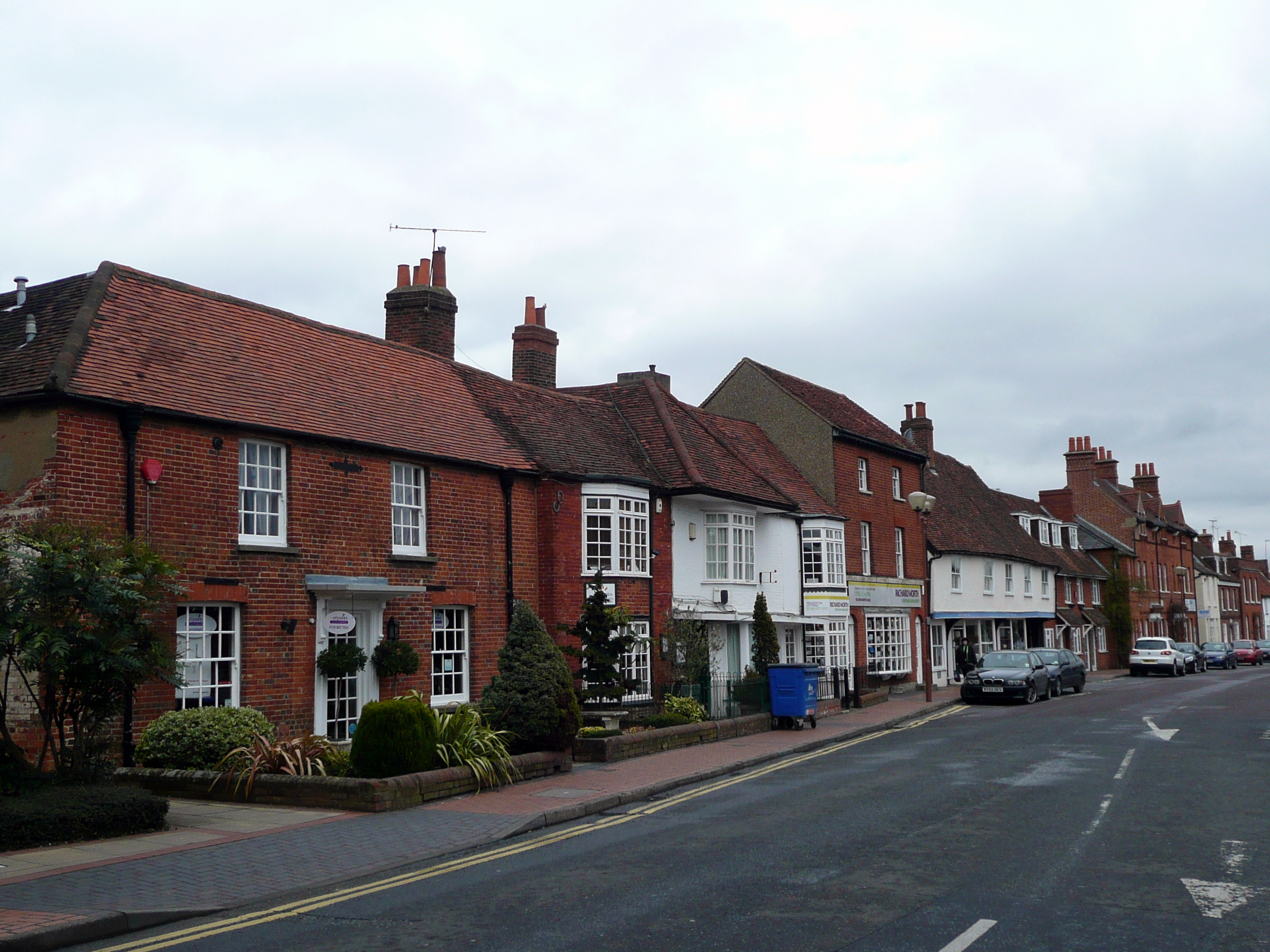
- Clockwise from top: Wokingham town hall, Denmark Street, Rose Street, All Saint's & St Paul's churches

- Location within Berkshire
- Area: 0.9 sq mi (2.3 km^{2})
- Population: 38,284 (Parish, 2021); 50,325 (Built up area, 2021)
- OS grid reference: SU8068
  - London: 39 mi (63 km) ENE
- Civil parish: Wokingham
- Unitary authority: Wokingham
- Ceremonial county: Berkshire
- Region: South East
- Country: England
- Sovereign state: United Kingdom
- Areas of the town: List: Barkham (Village); Crowthorne (Village); Eastheath; Finchampstead (Village); Gardener's Green (Village); Holme Green (Village); Sindlesham (Village); Town Centre; Wick Hill (Village); Winnersh (Village) (part); Wixenford (Village); Woosehill
- Post town: WOKINGHAM
- Postcode district: RG40, RG41
- Dialling code: 0118
- Police: Thames Valley
- Fire: Royal Berkshire
- Ambulance: South Central
- UK Parliament: Wokingham
- Website: www.wokingham-tc.gov.uk

Wokingham (/ˈwoʊkɪŋəm/ WOH-king-əm) is a market town and civil parish in Berkshire, England. It is the main administrative centre of the wider Borough of Wokingham. At the 2021 census the parish had a population of 38,284 and the wider built-up area had a population of 50,325.

== Etymology ==
Wokingham means 'Wocca's people's home'. Wocca was apparently a Saxon chieftain who may also have owned lands at Wokefield in Berkshire and Woking in Surrey. In Victorian times, the name became corrupted to Oakingham, and consequently the acorn with oak leaves is the town's heraldic charge, granted in the 19th century.

== History ==
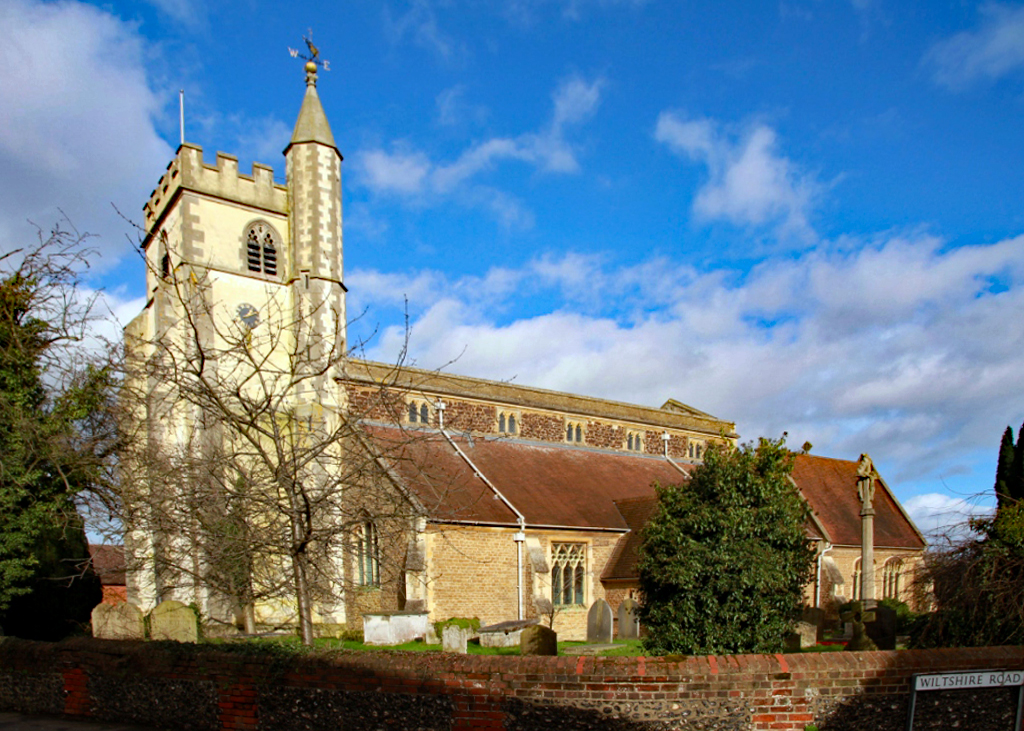
Wokingham All Saints Church

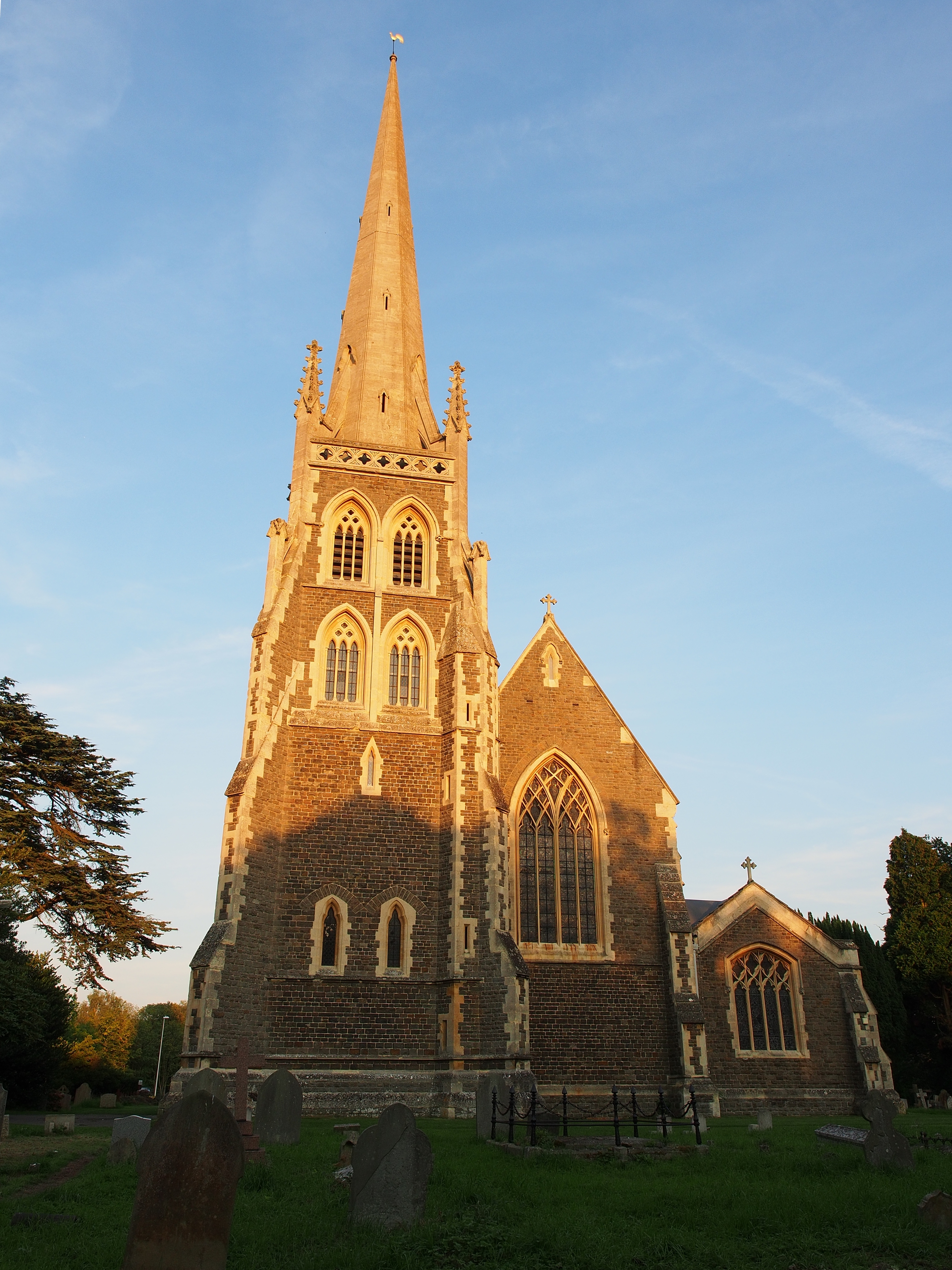
St Paul's Church

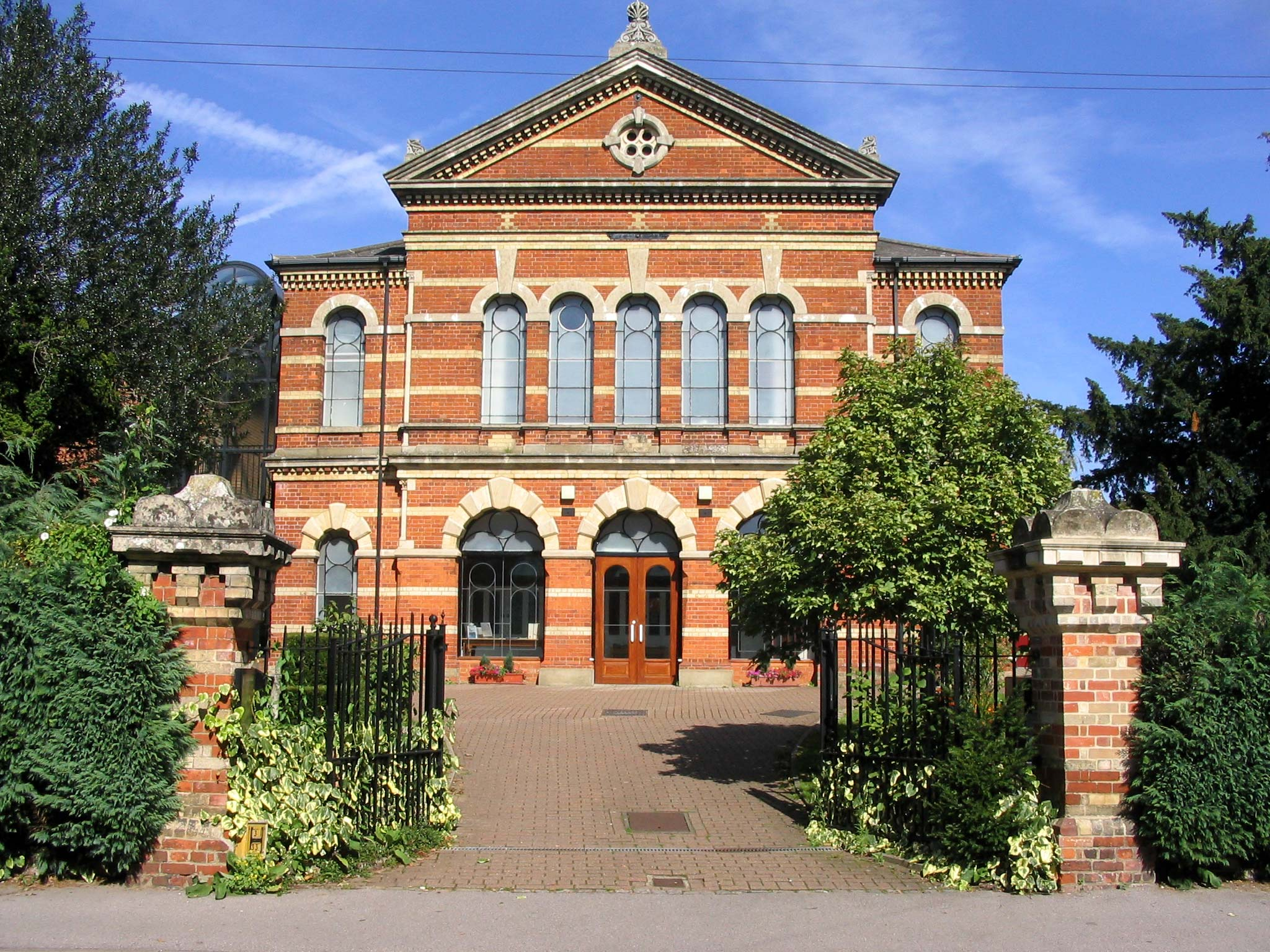
Wokingham Baptist Church

Geologically, Wokingham sits at the northern end of the Bagshot Formation, overlying London clay, suggesting a prehistorical origin as a marine estuary. The courts of Windsor Forest were held at Wokingham and the town had the right to hold a market from 1219. The Bishop of Salisbury was largely responsible for the growth of the town during this period. He set out roads and plots making them available for rent. There are records showing that in 1258 he bought the rights to hold three town fairs every year.

From the 14th to the 16th centuries, Wokingham was well known for its bell foundry which supplied many churches across the South of England. During the Tudor period, Wokingham was well known as a producer of silk. Some of the houses involved in these cottage industries are still to be seen in Rose Street. In the years 1643–44 Wokingham was regularly raided by both sides in the Civil War. These raids would involve the looting of livestock and trading goods, and over thirty buildings were burnt down, accounting for nearly 20% of buildings in the town at that time. It was not until the early 18th century that Wokingham had fully recovered.

Wokingham was once famous for its bull-baiting. In 1661 George Staverton left a bequest in his will giving two bulls to be tethered in the Market Place and baited by dogs on St. Thomas' Day (21 December) each year.The bulls were paraded around the town a day or two before the event and then locked in the yard of the original Rose Inn which was situated on the site of the present-day Superdrug store. People travelled from miles around to see the dangerous spectacle. A number of dogs would be maimed or killed during the event and the bulls were eventually destroyed. The meat and leather were distributed amongst the poor people of the town. Some of the spectators also sustained fatal injuries. In 1794 on the morning after the bull-baiting Elizabeth North was found dead and covered with bruises. In 1808, 55-year-old Martha May died after being hurt by fighters in the crowd. The cruel 'sport' was prohibited by the Corporation in 1821 but bulls were still provided at Christmas and the meat distributed to the poor. Bull-baiting was banned by Act of Parliament in 1835.

In 1723, the 'Black Act' was passed in Parliament to make it an offence to black one's face to commit criminal acts. It was named after an infamous band of ruffians, known as the 'Wokingham Blacks', who terrorised the local area until 29 of them were arrested after fighting a pitched battle with Grenadier Guards in Bracknell. The formerly important industry of brick-making has given way to software development, light engineering and service industries, and the population has greatly increased.

== Governance ==
There are two tiers of local government covering Wokingham, at civil parish (town) and unitary authority level: Wokingham Town Council and Wokingham Borough Council. The town council is based at Wokingham Town Hall in the Market Place, which was built in 1860 on the site of an earlier guildhall. The borough council is also based in the town, having its headquarters at Shute End.

Wokingham forms part of the wider Wokingham constituency. Its MP is Clive Jones, a Liberal Democrat, who won the seat at the 2024 general election.

=== Administrative history ===
Wokingham was historically part of the ancient parish of Sonning. Wokingham became a chapelry in the Middle Ages; its church of All Saints was built in the 14th century, probably on the site of a 12th-century chapel. The chapelry of Wokingham was a separate civil parish from an early date, but remained part the ecclesiastical parish of Sonning until 1812.

The town was also an ancient borough. Its date of becoming a borough is unknown, but it may have followed the grant of rights to hold a market at Wokingham to the Bishop of Salisbury (as lord of the manor of Sonning) in 1219. The town's first known charter was issued by Elizabeth I in 1583. The civil parish of Wokingham was subdivided into three townships, being Wokingham North, Wokingham South, and a Wokingham township covering the central part of the town, the latter township being presumed to correspond to the original borough. The Wokingham North township covered the area north-east of the town centre, including All Saints' Church and the Ashridge and Dowlesgreen areas; that township was a detached part of Wiltshire until it was transferred to Berkshire under the Counties (Detached Parts) Act 1844.

By the 1830s, the borough extended beyond the Wokingham township to cover most of the parish. The borough was left unreformed when most ancient boroughs were converted into municipal boroughs in 1836. The borough corporation continued to exist, but as Wokingham was not a municipal borough, local government functions were gradually given instead to the board of guardians of the Wokingham poor law union. The Municipal Corporations Act 1883 directed that unreformed boroughs such as Wokingham were either to be converted into municipal boroughs under a new charter by 1886, or would be abolished. Wokingham then secured a new charter converting it into a municipal borough in 1885. A new borough boundary was drawn, covering the built up area as it then was and some immediately adjoining areas.

Under the Local Government Act 1894, parishes were no longer allowed to straddle borough boundaries. The parish of Wokingham was therefore split into a 'Wokingham Within' parish covering the same area as the borough, and a Wokingham Without parish covering the parts of the old parish outside the borough boundary.

The municipal borough of Wokingham was abolished in 1974 under the Local Government Act 1972, with the area merging with the surrounding Wokingham Rural District to become a new non-metropolitan district called Wokingham. District-level functions formerly performed by the borough council passed to the new Wokingham District Council. A successor parish called Wokingham covering the area of the former borough was created in 1974, with its council taking the name Wokingham Town Council. Wokingham District Council became a unitary authority in 1998 when it took over county-level functions from the abolished Berkshire County Council.

== Geography ==
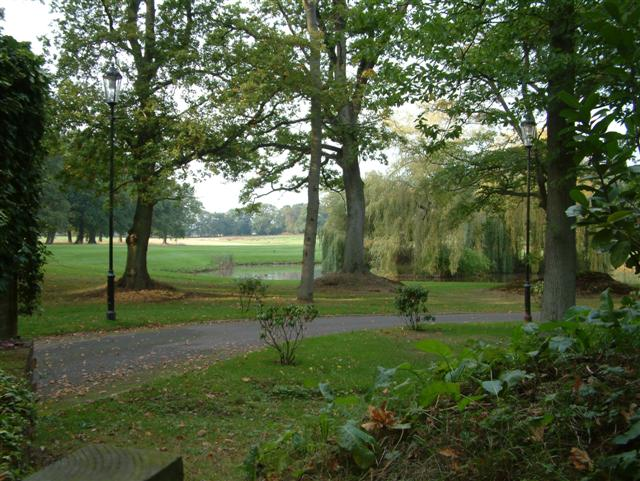
Agates Meadow

Wokingham is on the Emm Brook in the Loddon Valley in central Berkshire situated 39 miles (62.8 km) west of central London. It sits between the larger towns of Reading and Bracknell and was originally in a band of agricultural land on the western edge of Windsor Forest. The soil is a rich loam with a subsoil of sand and gravel. Wokingham has a town centre, with main residential areas radiating in all directions. These include Woosehill to the west, Emmbrook to the northwest, Dowlesgreen, Norreys, Keephatch and Bean Oak to the east, and to the south Wescott and Eastheath. Older names include Woodcray and Luckley Green.

Wokingham has grown extensively since the mid-20th century. Woosehill and Dowlesgreen were built on farmland in the late 1960s and early 1970s, along with Bean Oak. Keephatch was built in the early 1990s. The Norreys Estate was built in the 1960s; however, Norreys Avenue is the oldest residential road in that area, having been built in the late 1940s as emergency housing following the Second World War. Norreys Avenue has a horseshoe shape and occupies the site of the demolished Norreys Manor. Much of the road contains 1940s-style prefabricated houses, although there are some brick houses along with three blocks of 1950s police houses.

In 2010, the council set up WEL (Wokingham Enterprise Limited) to manage a £100m regeneration project to redevelop the town centre with new retail, leisure and residential facilities, parking, roads and open spaces. Several major expansion projects around the town are planned over the next decade, including a major redevelopment of the town centre, new north and south relief roads and at the former military base at nearby Arborfield Green. As of 2015, the redevelopment of the railway station and surrounding area is complete, and large scale housing construction is underway to the north-east and south-east of the town.

The Wokingham built up area now extends beyond the parish boundary. Following the 2021 census, the Office for National Statistics has defined a Wokingham built up area which covers most of the parish of Wokingham and parts of neighbouring parishes, notably Finchampstead to the south and Barkham to the south-west.

== Transport ==
The A329(M) motorway, accessible from the east of town, connects Wokingham to Reading and the rest of the motorway network at junction 10 of the M4. The Wokingham junction is where the A329(M) ends and becomes the A322, for Bracknell and the M3.

Wokingham railway station is at the junction of the Waterloo to Reading line with the North Downs Line. South Western Railway manages the station and provides services, along with Great Western Railway.

Most local bus services are provided by Thames Valley Buses, but the services from Wokingham to Reading and Bracknell are operated by Reading Buses, after First Berkshire & The Thames Valley closed their Bracknell depot in the summer of 2015. There is also a football bus run on Reading FC match days by Stagecoach South to the Madejski Stadium.

== Institutions ==
=== Charities ===
- The redundant Lucas Hospital, almshouses founded in 1663 for sixteen elderly men from the surrounding parishes
- Wokingham United Charities providing grants to people living within the Wokingham area relieving poverty, hardship, and distress; as well as providing sheltered accommodation.

=== Churches ===
- All Saints' Church (CofE). Now a Grade II* listed historic building. Founded in 1180 as a chapel-of-ease from Sonning. Extensively re-built in the late 15th century and restored and expanded in the mid-19th century.
- Corpus Christi Catholic Church, Wokingham. The current church building was opened by the Bishop of the Roman Catholic Diocese of Portsmouth, Derek Worlock, on the 14th of November 1970.
- St. Paul's Church (CofE), built by John Walter III in 1864
- Wokingham Baptist Church
- Wokingham Methodist Church
- Christ Church Wokingham (CofE). Officially The Church at the White House, Christ Church is not a church building but an extra-parochial congregation currently meeting temporarily in hired premises.
- Woosehill Community Church
- Norreys Church
- Kings Church Wokingham

=== Manors ===
- Evendon's Manor
- Ashridge Manor (now in Hurst, Berkshire)
- Beche's Manor (burnt down 1953)
- Norreys' Manor (demolished long ago, now Norreys Avenue)

=== Other buildings of note ===
- Keep Hatch House (Built 1871–74, demolished late 1990s due to dereliction to make way for the Keephatch housing estate)

== Education ==
=== Secondary schools ===
Wokingham is served by five state secondary schools.

- The Emmbrook School is a mixed-sex comprehensive school
- St Crispin's School is a mixed-sex comprehensive school
- The Forest School is a mixed-sex comprehensive school in the neighbouring village of Winnersh
- The Holt School is a girls' school (founded in 1931 in the Dower House of Beche's Manor)
- Bohunt School Wokingham is a mixed-sex comprehensive school opened in 2016.

=== Private schools ===
- Holme Grange School founded in 1945 for Girls and Boys aged 3–16 years
- Luckley House School founded at Luckley House in 1918 for girls aged 11–18, now a boarding and day school for boys and girls
- White House Preparatory School, for girls aged 2–11, now closed

=== Junior School ===
Westende Junior School is a co-educational junior school established in 1974. The school caters for children from the ages of seven to eleven. The school is near the town centre in Seaford Road and is bordered by St Crispin's School and the King George V playing field. The majority of children at Westende come from the nearby Wescott Infant School, and the two schools share a joint Parent Teachers' Association. In September 1995 the school opened 'The Acorns', the first junior school resource in Berkshire for pupils with a diagnosis of Special Educational Need for autism spectrum disorders (ASD).

== Primary schools ==
- St Theresa’s Catholic Academy
- The Hawthorns Primary School
- Evendons Primary School
- All Saints CofE Primary School
- St. Paul’s CofE Primary School
- Emmbrook Junior School

== Media ==
The town's local newspapers include Wokingham Today, which is also online.

== Literature ==
In the 18th century, the Ballad of Molly Mogg was written in Wokingham. Molly was the barmaid daughter of the publican of the old Rose Inn (not on the site of the present one). She was well known to local Binfield man, Alexander Pope, who, during a storm, found himself stranded at the inn with his friends, Gay, Swift and Arbuthnot. They wrote the ballad extolling her virtues to pass the time. Wokingham is the setting of Lars Iyer's 2019 novel Nietzsche and the Burbs. The character of Tom the chimney sweep in Charles Kingsley's classic childhood story The Water Babies was based on the life and times of a Wokingham boy called James Seaward, who was a boy sweep in Victorian times. In his later years, Seaward swept the chimneys at Charles Kingsley's home at the Rectory in Eversley, Hampshire. Seaward was elected Alderman of Wokingham from 1909 until his death in 1921. He had 12 children. The Water Babies are the subject of Wokingham's first public sculpture, installed in 1999, which graces the upper-level entrance to Wokingham Library.

== Film ==
The 1971 film See No Evil, also released under the title Blind Terror, was filmed in and around Wokingham, with scenes shot at the since-redeveloped Wokingham railway station. Scenes for ITV series Primeval were filmed at Wokingham's Red Lion pub.

== Sport and leisure ==
- There are public parks at Barkham Road Recreation Ground, Langborough Recreation Ground, Cantley Park, Chestnut Park, Heron Park, Elizabeth Road Recreation Ground, Elms Field, Riverside Walk, and Waverley Park.
- There is a local nature reserve called Holt Copse & Joel Park.
- The council provides a number of leisure facilities such as the Carnival Hub, St. Crispin's Sports Centre and the Pinewood Leisure Centre. Pinewood is the base for over 20 clubs and associations. There is a King George V Playing Field behind St. Crispin's in memory of King George V.
- The local football team is Wokingham Town F.C.
- The Wokingham Half Marathon is held each February and starts and finishes at Cantley Park.
- Wokingham Library is now located in the Carnival Hub leisure centre having relocated from Denmark Street in September 2022.
- Wokingham Cricket Club (founded 1825) played at their ground on Wellington Road before relocating to a new, bigger ground in Sindlesham in 2012.
- Wokingham Music, Food & Drink Festival is held every August. Showcasing local musicians, local food producers and also wines, beers, and ciders from Berkshire and surrounding breweries.
- Wokingham Open Air Cinema. For its second year, three films were shown the weekend before the Wokingham Festival.
- Saint Sebastian Wokingham Band, local brass band bringing a wide variety of music to the community since 1931.

== Twin towns ==
Wokingham is twinned with:

- Erftstadt in Germany
- Viry-Châtillon in France

== Notable people ==
- Luke Bedford, composer
- Thomas Bradley, chaplain to King Charles I
- Sir Richard Browne, 1st Baronet, of London, born in Wokingham sometime prior to 1616
- Isaac Deutscher, Polish historian and political activist, lived in Wokingham from the late 1950s to 1963.
- Claude Duval, highwayman, supposedly owned a house in the town.
- Dick Francis, writer
- Thomas Godwin, Bishop of Bath and Wells, born and died in Wokingham
- Nicholas Hoult, actor and model
- Daniel Howell, YouTuber, author and former BBC Radio 1 presenter
- Frederick Lucas, founder of The Tablet
- Henry Lucas, founder of the Lucasian Professorship of Mathematics at the University of Cambridge
- Leslie Sears, cricketer
- Anne Snelgrove, MP
- Bill Stone, veteran of both World Wars; lived in Sindlesham
- William Talman, architect and landscape designer
- Mark Tildesley, murdered in Wokingham, on 1 June 1984, at the age of seven
- John Walter III, local benefactor and proprietor of The Times newspaper.
- Anna Watkins, gold medallist at the 2012 London Olympics and bronze medallist at the Beijing Olympics in 2008 in the women's double sculls
- Will Young, singer and Pop Idol's Series 1 (2002) winner
- James Songer, rapper
