= Sennybridge Training Area =

Military training area in Powys, Wales

Sennybridge Training Area (SENTA)
- Sennybridge
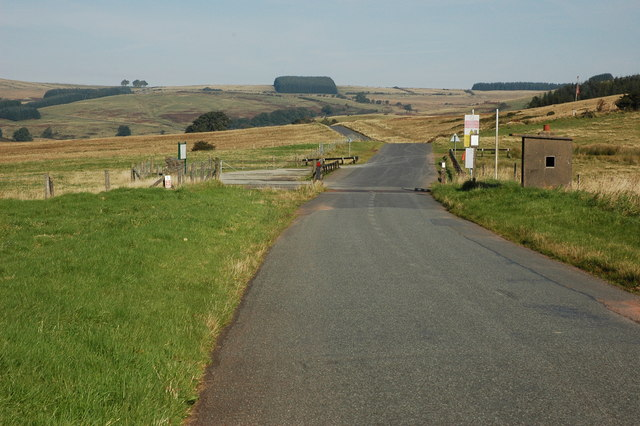
- Entrance to the training area

Site information
- Type: Training Area
- Owner: Ministry of Defence
- Operator: British Army
- Controlled by: Defence Infrastructure Organisation

Location
- Location within Powys
- Coordinates: 52°03′07″N 3°33′32″W

Site history
- Built: 1939
- Built for: War Office
- In use: 1939-Present

The Sennybridge Training Area (SENTA) is a UK Ministry of Defence military training area near the village of Sennybridge in Powys, Wales. It consists of approximately 12,545 ha (31,000 acres) of Ministry of Defence freehold land and 2,428 ha (6,000 acres) of land leased from Forest Enterprise.

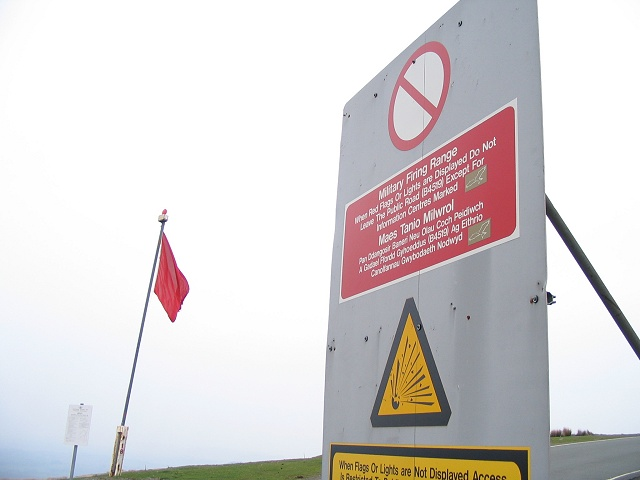
Danger sign above Cwm Graig Ddu

The training area is the third largest military training area in the United Kingdom. It covers 19 km (12 mi) south west to north east and 8 km (5 mi) south east to north west. It lies to the north of the Brecon Beacons National Park on Mynydd Eppynt. The site was acquired by the War Office in 1939.

In 2023 a driver for the British military died on Sennybridge Training Area.

== Units ==
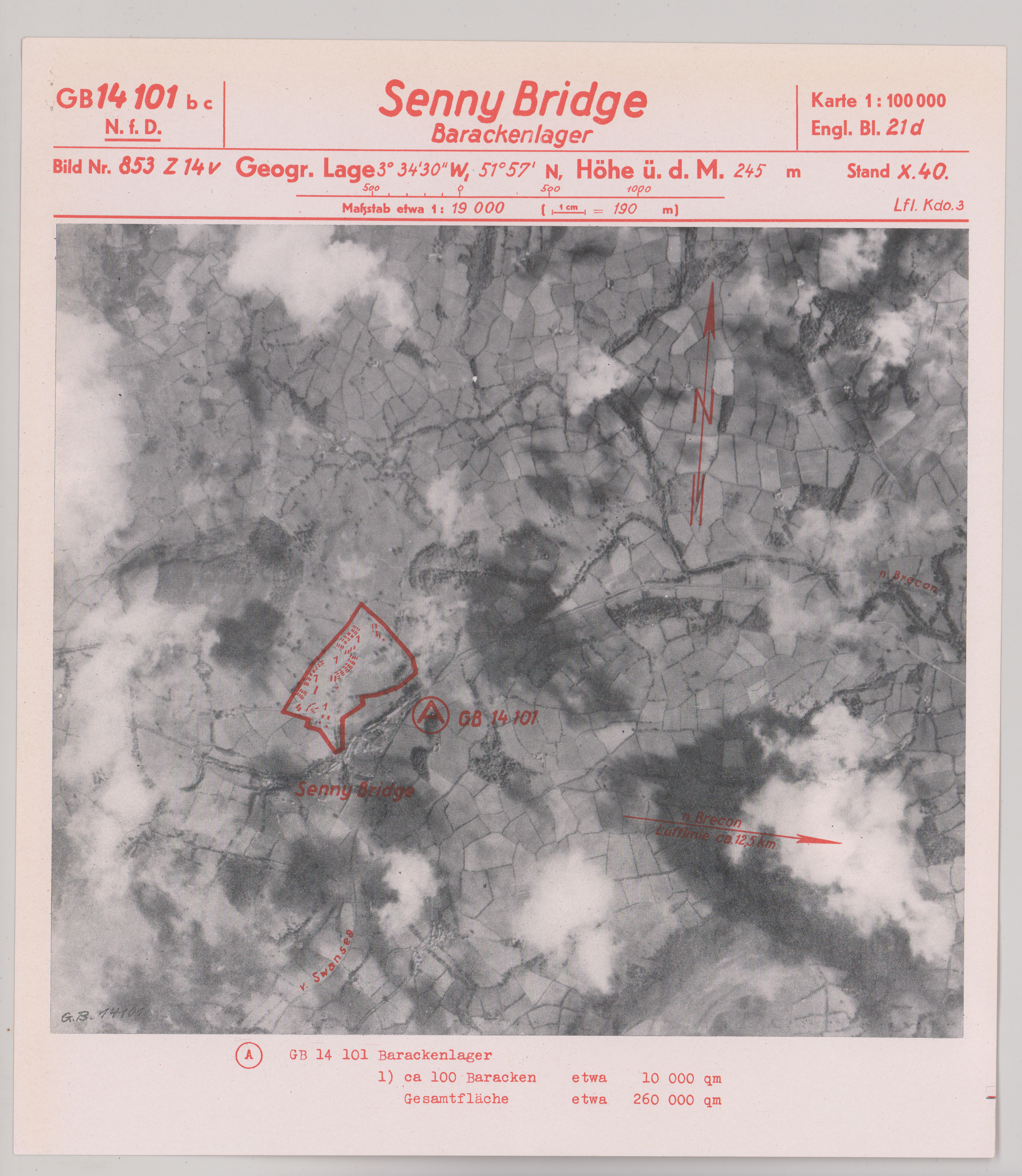
Sennybridge Training Area on a target dossier of the German Luftwaffe, 1940

- Soldier Development Wing - part of ATC Pirbright.
- Queen's Division Courses - Divisional Training Team Delivering Distributed Training for the Queen's Division.
