= Emmbrook School =

Coordinates: 51°25′18″N 0°51′6″W

The Emmbrook School
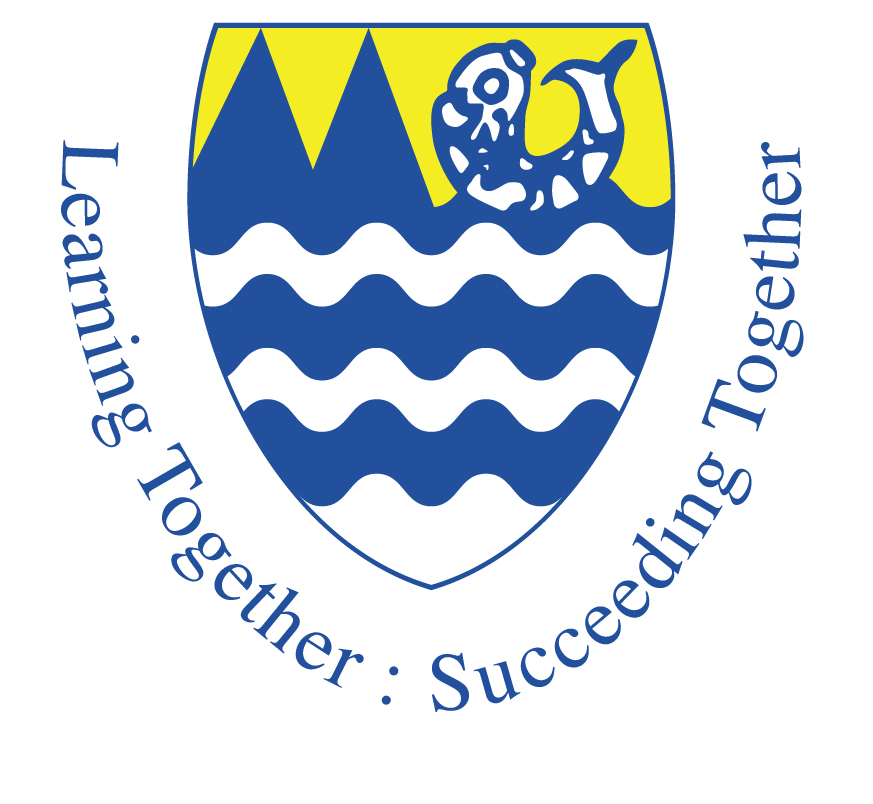
- The Emmbrook School Badge and Motto

Location
- Emmbrook Road; Wokingham, Berkshire, RG41 1JP; England

Information
- Type: Academy
- Motto: Learning Together : Succeeding Together
- Established: 1964
- Local authority: Wokingham
- Department for Education URN: 148453 Tables
- Ofsted: Reports
- Head teacher: Nick McSweeney
- Gender: Co-educational
- Age: 11 to 18
- Enrolment: 1,400
- Houses: Venus (blue), Jupiter (yellow), Mercury (red), Saturn (green)
- Colours: Blue and yellow
- Website: emmbrook.wokingham.sch.uk

The Emmbrook School is a co-educational secondary academy in Emmbrook, Wokingham, Berkshire, England. It accepts pupils aged 11 to 18 and has approximately 1,378 pupils, including nearly 200 in the sixth form. The school expanded its Year 7 intake in September 2021.

In April 2021, the Emmbrook School converted to academy status and is now sponsored by The Circle Trust. Previously, it was a community school administered by Wokingham Borough Council.

== Academic performance and inspections ==
The school was rated "Good" in all areas by Ofsted following an inspection in October 2023.

The A Level results in 2024 prompted an early day motion in parliament by Clive Jones MP, congratulating the school on its success. The sixth form maintained similar results in 2025.

== Facilities ==
A £2 million English block was opened in 2015, followed by a new Maths building in 2017 and a 3G sports pitch in 2020. In 2025, parents and students petitioned Wokingham Borough Council to support the construction of a sixth form block.

== Curriculum ==
In Years 7, 8, and 9, children study the core subjects (English, maths, and science), humanities, languages, and creative subjects including art and design, computer science and food technology. In Years 10 and 11, all students study for qualifications in English, English literature, maths, and science, and can choose additional subjects. In Years 12 and 13, students can study a range of A-levels and Vocational Qualifications.

== Extra-curricular ==
In 2025, the Emmbrook School were county champions in the magistrates' mock trial competition.

== Tirabad ==
The Emmbrook School, with Maiden Erlegh School and Charters School, co-owns an outdoor education residential centre located in the Welsh village of Tirabad, Powys. Students from years 7-10 and the Sixth Form have the opportunity to spend a week at the centre once a year. The centre's activities are climbing, sailing, canoeing, caving, orienteering, environmental and field studies.

Sixth form students from the three trust schools (Emmbrook, Maiden Erlegh, and Charters) jointly support the annual New Futures trip, in which students with disabilities travel to Tirabad. These volunteer students raise funds through charity work and then attend the trip to provide support for the younger children.

On 26 February 2021, a letter was sent to parents stating that Tyr Abad Residential Educational Trust was entering voluntary liquidation.

== Headteachers ==
There have been 6 headteachers and 1 acting headteacher during the school's existence

- 1965 – 1983: Richard Carter
- 1983 – 1997: Edward Burton
- 1997 – 2005: John Goulborn
- 2005 – 2006: Linda Peart (acting)
- 2006 – 2016: Nigel Matthias
- 2016 – 2019: Paul O'Neill
- 2019–present: Nick McSweeney
