= Emmbrook, Berkshire =

Suburb of Wokingham in Berkshire, England

Coordinates: 51.4228°N 0.8542°W

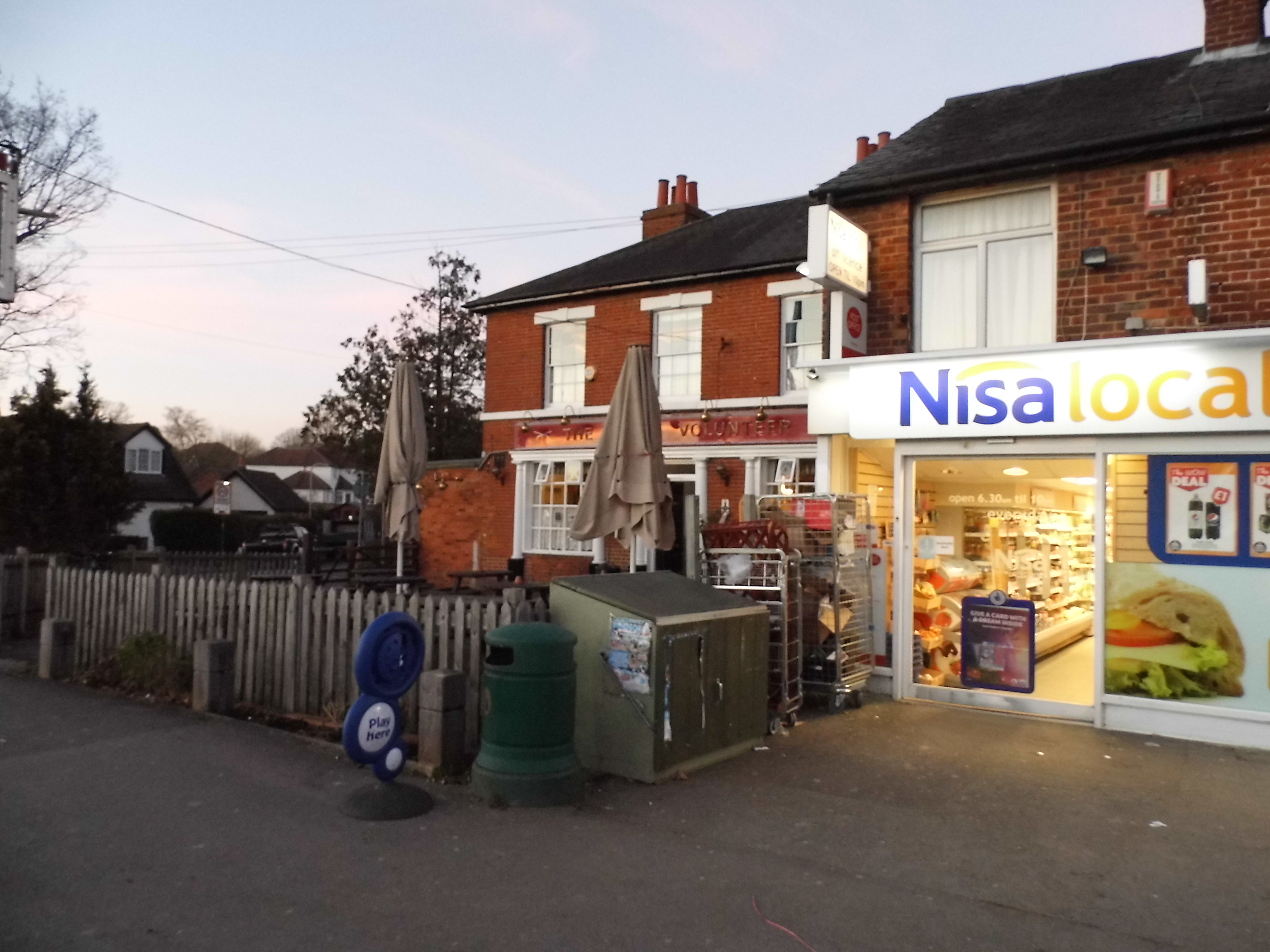
Reading Road shops

Emmbrook is a suburb of the town of Wokingham in the county of Berkshire, England.

The suburb takes its name from the Emm Brook, a small river that is a tributary of the River Loddon.

There are four schools in Emmbrook: Emmbrook Junior School, Emmbrook Infant School, St Cecilia's Primary school and The Emmbrook School (11–18yrs). The latter is one of four main secondary schools serving Wokingham, and one of two schools in Wokingham with a specialism in Maths and Computing.

Other local amenities in Emmbrook include three pubs: The Dog and Duck, The Rifle Volunteer and The Emmbrook Inn (formerly The Thatched Cottage); shops, a village hall, two social centres, a small business park, a post office and an Indian restaurant.

Sports clubs include Wokingham Town FC, Emmbrook & Bearwood Cricket Club and Emmbrook & Wokingham Boxing Club.

The 1st Emmbrook Scout Troop, based at Hedley Hall, was launched on 19 February 1964 by Helmut van Emden. It was run by Martin and Jessamy Wilson from 1988 to 2024. It is currently run by DJ Pratt. It boasts one Explorer pack, two Scout packs, two Cub packs and two Beaver packs, with over 200 local children attending.

Holt Copse and Joel Park, named for local landowner Solomon Joel, lie to the south east, and Old Forest Meadows lie to the north west of Emmbrook.
