= Dinton Pastures Country Park =

Park in Berkshire, England

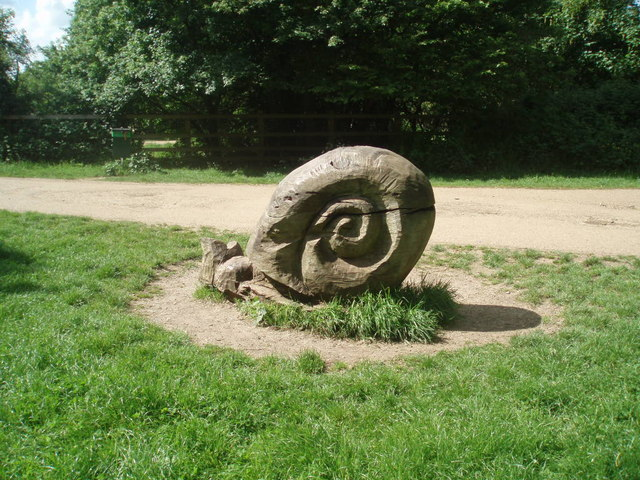
- Snail sculpture at the entrance to Dinton Pastures Country Park
- Interactive map of Dinton Pastures Country Park
- Type: country park
- Location: Hurst, Berkshire; England
- Coordinates: 51.446°N 0.879°W
- Created: 1979
- Operator: Wokingham Borough Council
- Status: Open all year

Dinton Pastures Country Park is a country park in the civil parish of St Nicholas Hurst, in the borough of Wokingham, near Reading in the English county of Berkshire.

== Geography and site ==
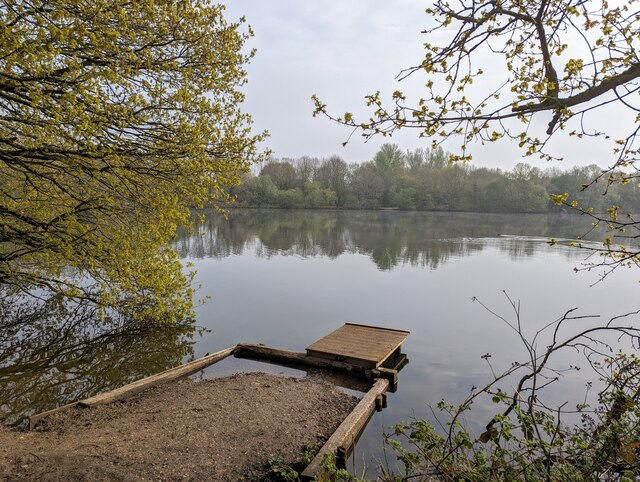
Jetty on Black Swan Lake

The park is 450 acres (180 ha) in size. It has seven lakes, two rivers, three public bird hides, and meadows. One of the lakes, Lavells Lake is designated as a local nature reserve. The two rivers that flow through the park are the River Loddon and the Emm Brook. The Museum of Berkshire Aviation and the headquarters of the British Entomological and Natural History Society are both located in the park.

The site is popular for a number of sports including sailing, angling, kayaking, canoeing, and running, playing host to a parkrun. Other facilities include play areas and a cafe.

== History ==
Anglo Saxons farmed the park's river meadows and called the area Whistley, where "wisc" means marshy meadows and "lei" means a woodland clearing. From the start of the 17th century, much of the area then belonged to Windsor Forest.

The present-day cafe was originally a farmhouse built in 1904, which was called 'High Chimneys'. In 1924 the area was sold to a farmer who renamed the farm after his home village of Dinton, near Aylesbury.

The country park is part of the river Loddon's flood plain and so makes a good source of gravel, between 1969 and 1979 an extensive gravel extraction program was carried out. Much of the gravel was used for the M4 and the A329(M).

In 1979 Dinton Pastures was opened to the public. In 1992, part of the country park, Lavells Lake, was declared as a local nature reserve by Wokingham Borough Council.

== Activities ==
This site has activities such as paddleboarding, kayaking, sailing, dinghies, nature buggies (pedal cars), and mini golf. These are all paid and more information can be viewed in the Dinton Activity Centre's web page.

There are also a variety of holiday camps and courses which can also be viewed on their site. These include sailing courses, guided paddles, and mixed sport holiday and weekend camps.

== Fauna ==
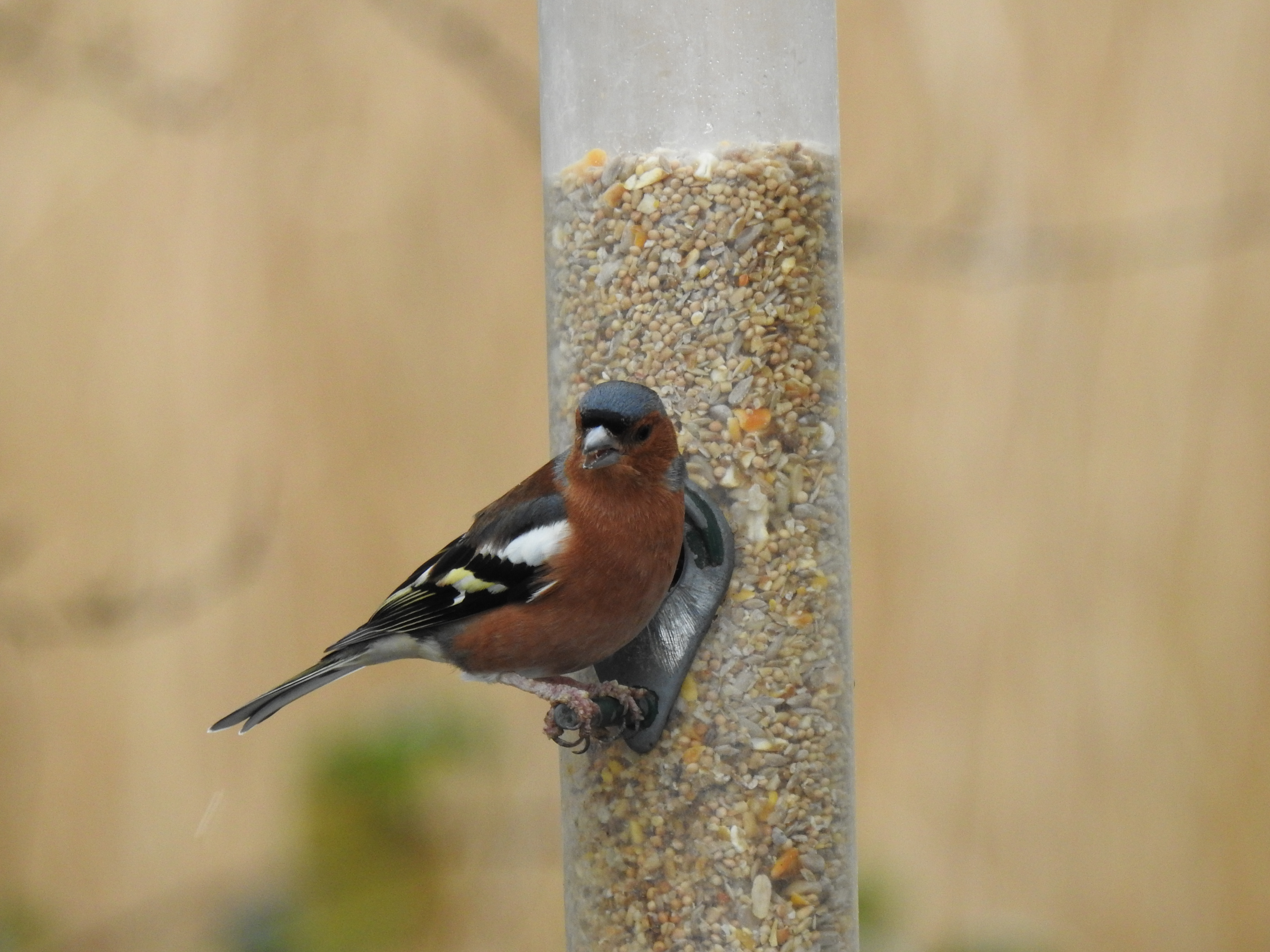
Eurasian chaffinch

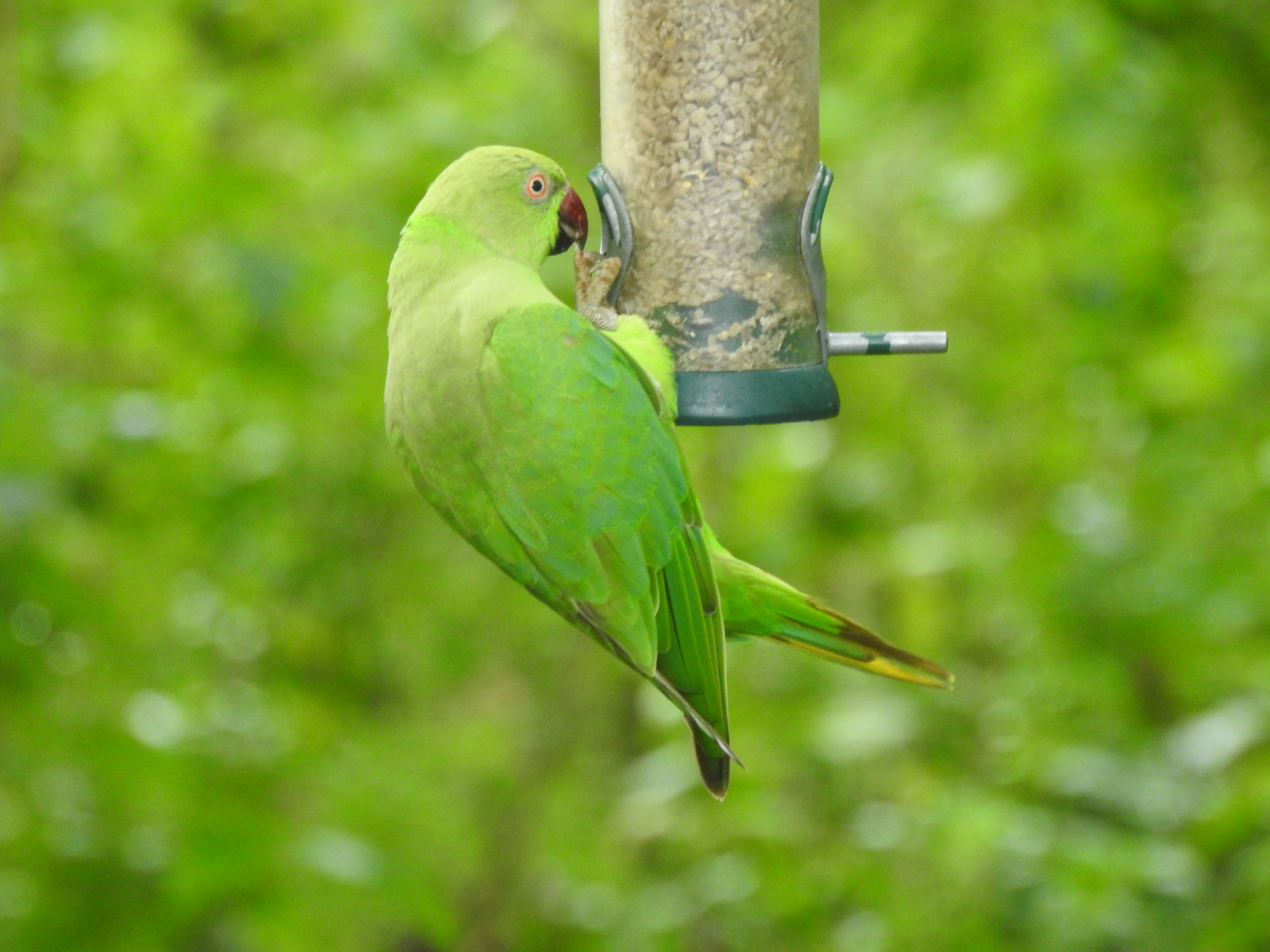
Rose-ringed parakeet

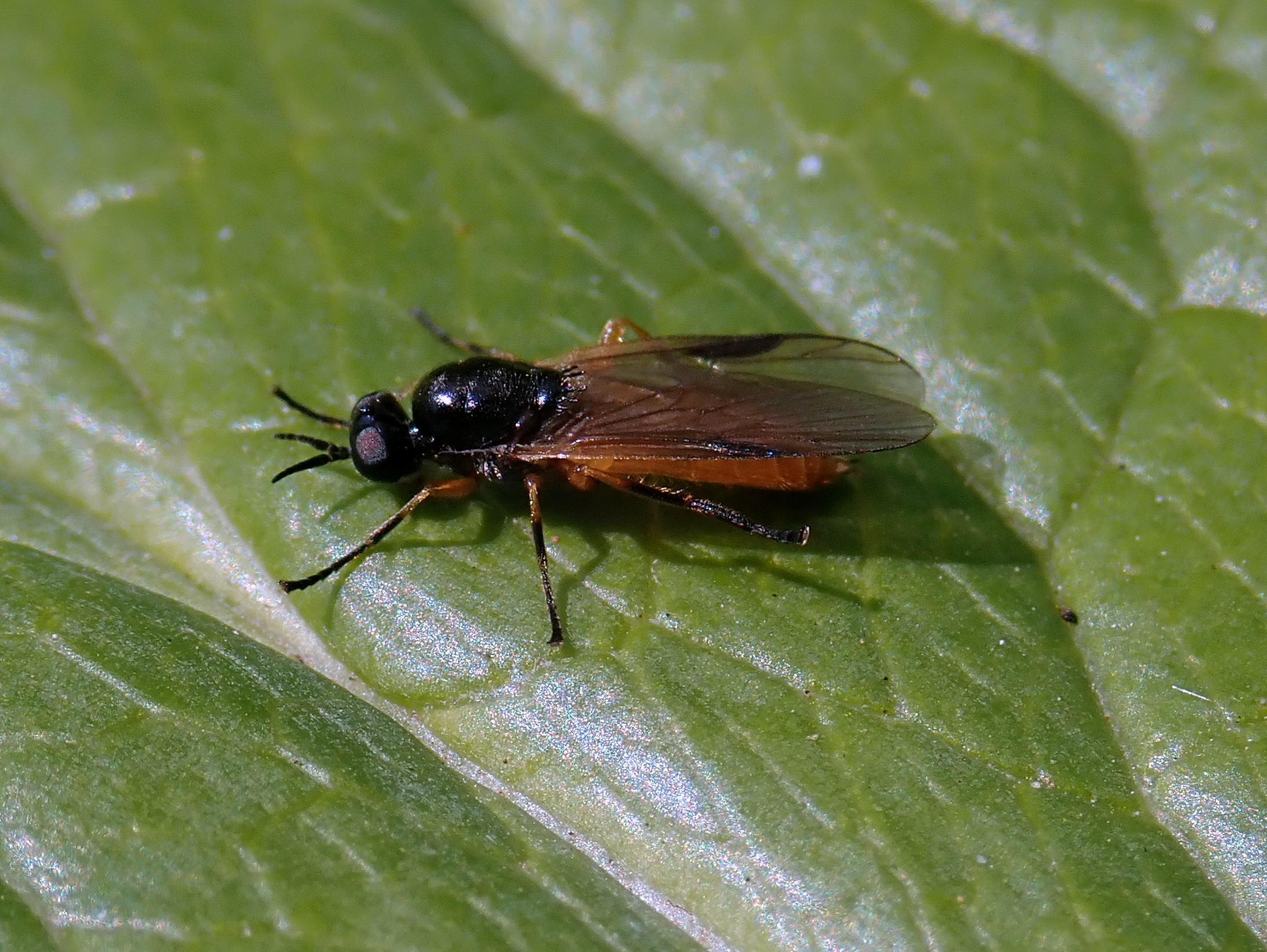
Beris vallata

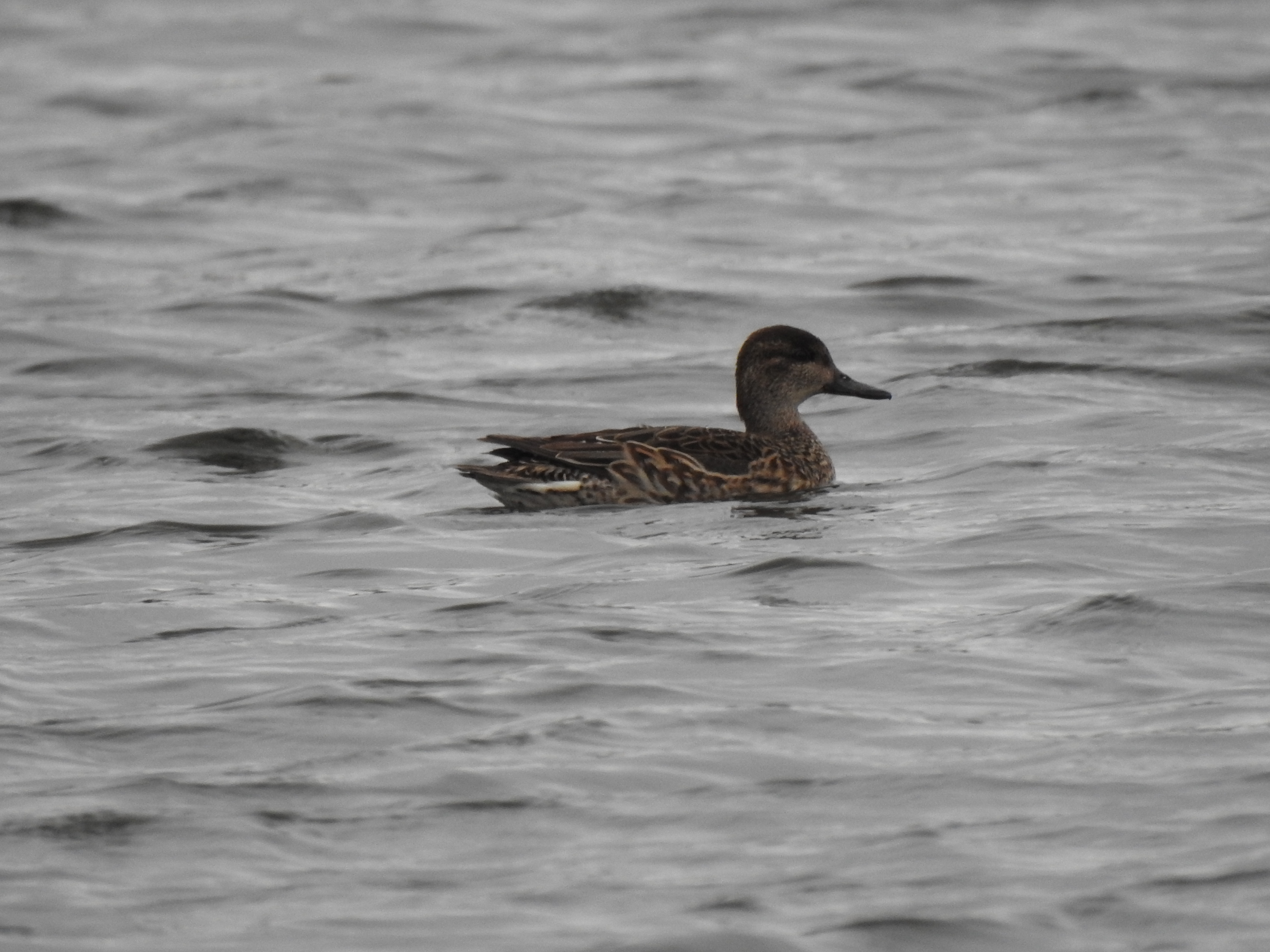
Eurasian teal

A collection of fauna located at Dinton

The site has the following fauna:

=== Mammals ===
- Soprano pipistrelle
- Common pipistrelle
- Daubenton's bat
- Brown long-eared bat
- European rabbit
- Red fox
- Roe deer
- Muntjac deer
- Stoat
- Weasel
- Wood mouse
- Eastern grey squirrel
- Field vole
- Mink

=== Invertebrates ===
- Anax imperator
- Aeshna grandis
- Aeshna cyanea
- Aeshna mixta
- Brachytron pratense
- Orthetrum cancellatum
- Sympetrum striolatum
- Sympetrum sanguineum
- Libellula quadrimaculata
- Libellula depressa
- Cordulia aenea
- Cordulegaster boltonii
- Aeshna juncea
- Calopteryx virgo
- Pyrrhosoma nymphula
- Enallagma cyathigerum
- Coenagrion lunulatum
- Ischnura elegans
- Erythromma najas
- Pieris napi
- Pieris brassicae
- Anthocharis cardamines
- Pieris rapae
- Gonepteryx rhamni
- Pyronia tithonus
- Maniola jurtina
- Melanargia galathea
- Aphantopus hyperantus
- Pararge aegeria
- Polygonia c-album
- Vanessa cardui
- Aglais io
- Vanessa atalanta
- Aglais urticae
- Polyommatus icarus
- Celastrina argiolus
- Aricia agestis
- Lycaena phlaeas
- Thymelicus sylvestris
- Thymelicus lineola
- Ochlodes sylvanus

=== Birds ===
- Little grebe
- Great crested grebe
- Bittern
- Little egret
- Grey heron
- Greylag goose
- Canada goose
- Mute swan
- Egyptian goose
- Shelduck
- Mandarin
- Eurasian wigeon
- Gadwall
- Teal
- Mallard
- Northern pintail
- Garganey
- Shoveler
- Red-crested pochard
- Pochard
- Tufted duck
- Goldeneye
- Smew
- Goosander
- Red kite
- Marsh harrier
- Sparrowhawk
- Common buzzard
- Osprey
- Common kestrel
- Hobby
- Peregrine falcon
- Red-legged partridge
- Pheasant
- Water rail
- Moorhen
- Coot
- Oystercatcher
- Little ringed plover
- Ringed plover
- Golden plover
- Northern lapwing
- Dunlin
- Ruff
- Jack snipe
- Common snipe
- Black-tailed godwit
- Bar-tailed godwit
- Eurasian whimbrel
- Eurasian curlew
- Common redshank
- Greenshank
- Green sandpiper
- Common sandpiper
- Mediterranean gull
- Little gull
- Black-headed gull
- Common gull
- Lesser black-backed gull
- Herring gull
- Yellow-legged gull
- Greater black-backed gull
- Sandwich tern
- Common tern
- Arctic tern
- Black tern
- Feral pigeon
- Stock dove
- Woodpigeon
- Collared dove
- Ring-necked parakeet
- Common cuckoo
- Barn owl
- Little owl
- Tawny owl
- Common swift
- Common kingfisher
- Eurasian green woodpecker
- Great spotted woodpecker
- Skylark
- Sand martin
- Swallow
- House martin
- Meadow pipit
- Western yellow wagtail
- Grey wagtail
- Pied wagtail
- Eurasian wren
- Dunnock
- Robin
- Nightingale
- Redstart
- Whinchat
- Stonechat
- Northern wheatear
- Common blackbird
- Fieldfare
- Redwing
- Song thrush
- Sedge warbler
- Reed warbler
- Lesser whitethroat
- Whitethroat
- Garden warbler
- Blackcap
- Common chiffchaff
- Willow warbler
- Goldcrest
- Firecrest
- Spotted flycatcher
- Long-tailed tit
- Coal tit
- Blue tit
- Great tit
- Nuthatch
- Treecreeper
- Jay
- Magpie
- Jackdaw
- Rook
- Carrion crow
- Raven
- Starling
- House sparrow
- Chaffinch
- Brambling
- Greenfinch
- European goldfinch
- Siskin
- Linnet
- Lesser redpoll
- Bullfinch
- Reed bunting

=== Amphibians and reptiles ===
- Common frog
- Grass snake
- Common toad
- Smooth newt
- Great crested newt
- Red-eared slider

=== Fish ===
- Common rudd
- Common roach
- Tench
- Common bream
- Northern pike
- Common barbel
- European chub
- Common carp
- European perch
- Three-spined stickleback

== Flora ==
The site has the following flora:

=== Trees ===
- Betula pendula
- Prunus spinosa
- Quercus robur

=== Plants ===
- Impatiens glandulifera
- Leucojum aestivum
- Ulex europaeus
- Anthriscus sylvestris
- Dipsacus
- Primula veris
- Phragmites communis
- Inula helenium
