= Lavells Lake =

Nature reserve in Berkshire, England

Coordinates: 51°27′02″N 0°52′27″W

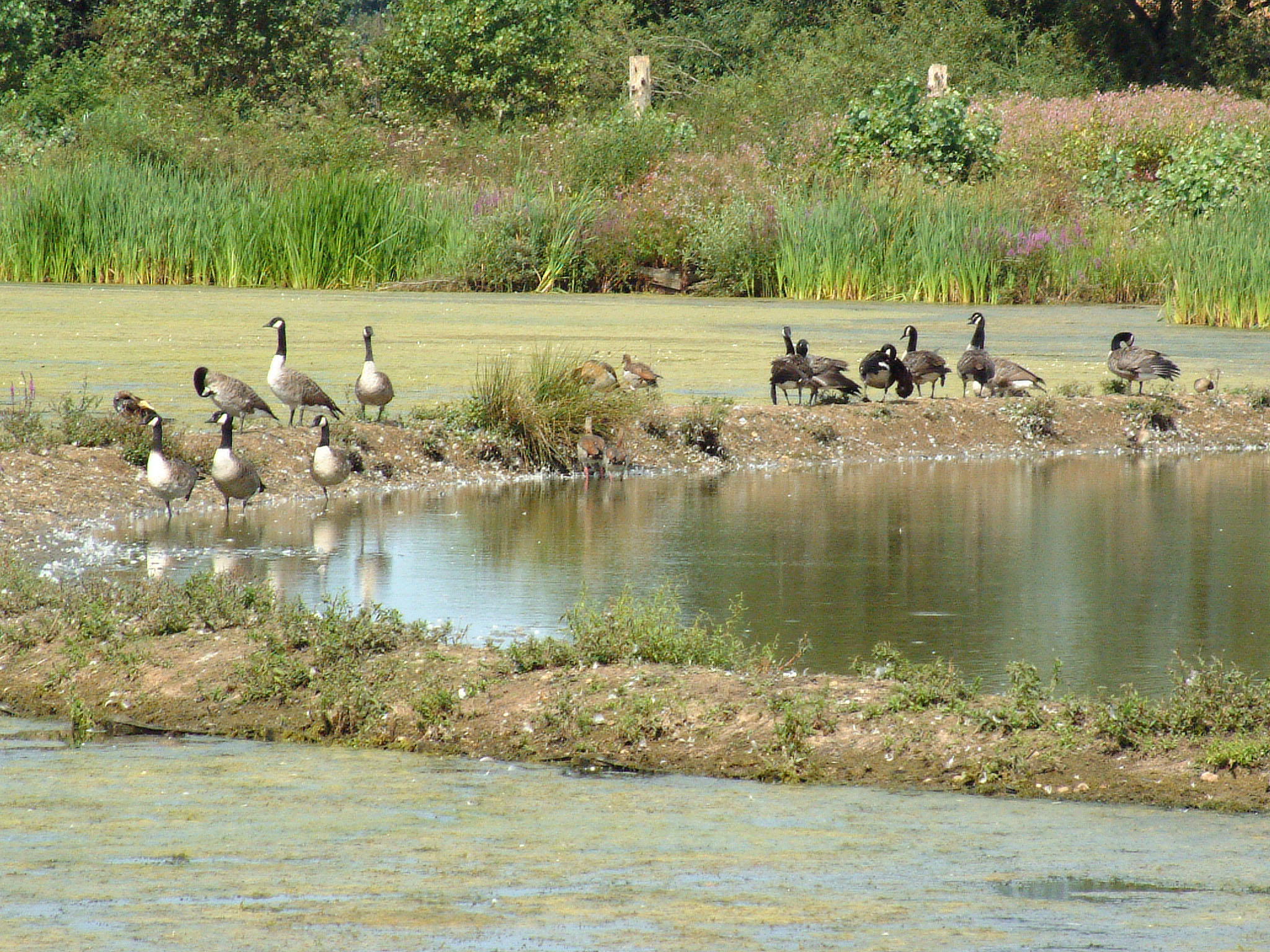
- Interactive map of Lavells Lake
- Type: Local Nature Reserve
- Location: Reading, Berkshire
- OS grid: SU 783 729
- Area: 12.5 hectares (31 acres)
- Manager: Wokingham District Council and The Friends of Lavell's Lake

Lavells Lake is a 12.5-hectare (31-acre) Local Nature Reserve on the outskirts of Woodley, a suburb of Reading in Berkshire. It is owned by Wokingham District Council and managed by the council and The Friends of Lavell's Lake. The nature reserve is part of Dinton Pastures Country Park.

== Geography and site ==
The nature reserve is a lake made from an old gravel pit and it has several bird hides.

== History ==
The lake was opened to the public in 1979 as part of the country park after the area was used for extracting gravel for 14 years.

In 1992 the site was declared as a local nature reserve by Wokingham Borough Council.

== Fauna ==
The site has the following fauna:

=== Mammals ===
- Soprano pipistrelle
- Common pipistrelle
- Daubenton's bat
- Brown long-eared bat
- European rabbit
- Red fox
- Roe deer
- Muntjac deer
- Stoat
- Weasel
- Wood mouse
- Eastern gray squirrel
- Field vole

=== Invertebrates ===
- Anax imperator
- Aeshna grandis
- Aeshna cyanea
- Aeshna mixta
- Brachytron pratense
- Orthetrum cancellatum
- Sympetrum striolatum
- Sympetrum sanguineum
- Libellula quadrimaculata
- Libellula depressa
- Cordulia aenea
- Cordulegaster boltonii
- Aeshna juncea
- Calopteryx virgo
- Pyrrhosoma nymphula
- Enallagma cyathigerum
- Coenagrion lunulatum
- Ischnura elegans
- Erythromma najas
- Pieris napi
- Pieris brassicae
- Anthocharis cardamines
- Pieris rapae
- Gonepteryx rhamni
- Pyronia tithonus
- Maniola jurtina
- Melanargia galathea
- Aphantopus hyperantus
- Pararge aegeria
- Polygonia c-album
- Vanessa cardui
- Aglais io
- Vanessa atalanta
- Aglais urticae
- Polyommatus icarus
- Celastrina argiolus
- Aricia agestis
- Lycaena phlaeas
- Thymelicus sylvestris
- Thymelicus lineola
- Ochlodes sylvanus

=== Birds ===
- Little grebe
- Great crested grebe
- Eurasian bittern
- Little egret
- Grey heron
- Greylag goose
- Canada goose
- Mute swan
- Egyptian goose
- Common shelduck
- Mandarin duck
- Eurasian wigeon
- Gadwall
- Eurasian teal
- Mallard
- Northern pintail
- Garganey
- Northern shoveler
- Red-crested pochard
- Common pochard
- Tufted duck
- Common goldeneye
- Smew
- Goosander
- Red kite
- Marsh harrier
- Eurasian sparrowhawk
- Common buzzard
- Osprey
- Common kestrel
- Eurasian hobby
- Peregrine falcon
- Red-legged partridge
- Common pheasant
- Water rail
- Eurasian moorhen
- Eurasian coot
- Eurasian oystercatcher
- Little ringed plover
- Common ringed plover
- European golden plover
- Northern lapwing
- Dunlin
- Ruff
- Jack snipe
- Common snipe
- Black-tailed godwit
- Bar-tailed godwit
- Whimbrel
- Eurasian curlew
- Redshank
- Common greenshank
- Green sandpiper
- Common sandpiper
- Mediterranean gull
- Little gull
- Black-headed gull
- Common gull
- Lesser black-backed gull
- European herring gull
- Yellow-legged gull
- Greater black-backed gull
- Sandwich tern
- Common tern
- Arctic tern
- Black tern
- Feral pigeon
- Stock dove
- Wood pigeon
- Eurasian collared dove
- Ring-necked parakeet
- Common cuckoo
- Barn owl
- Little owl
- Tawny owl
- Common swift
- Common kingfisher
- Green woodpecker
- Great spotted woodpecker
- Eurasian skylark
- Sand martin
- Barn swallow
- Common house martin
- Meadow pipit
- Yellow wagtail
- Grey wagtail
- Pied wagtail
- Eurasian wren
- Dunnock
- Robin
- Common nightingale
- Common redstart
- Whinchat
- European stonechat
- Northern wheatear
- Common blackbird
- Fieldfare
- Redwing
- Song thrush
- Sedge warbler
- Common reed warbler
- Lesser whitethroat
- Whitethroat
- Garden warbler
- Eurasian blackcap
- Common chiffchaff
- Willow warbler
- Goldcrest
- Firecrest
- Spotted flycatcher
- Long-tailed tit
- Coal tit
- Blue tit
- Great tit
- Eurasian nuthatch
- Eurasian treecreeper
- Eurasian jay
- Eurasian magpie
- Western jackdaw
- Rook
- Carrion crow
- Common raven
- Common starling
- House sparrow
- Common chaffinch
- Brambling
- European greenfinch
- Goldfinch
- Eurasian siskin
- Common linnet
- Lesser redpoll
- Eurasian bullfinch
- Common reed bunting

=== Amphibians and reptiles ===
- Common frog
- Grass snake
- Common toad
- Smooth newt
- Great crested newt
- Red-eared slider

== Flora ==
The site has the following flora:

=== Trees ===
- Betula pendula
- Prunus spinosa

=== Plants ===
- Impatiens glandulifera
- Leucojum aestivum
- Ulex europaeus
- Anthriscus sylvestris
- Dipsacus
- Primula veris
- Phragmites communis
- Inula helenium
