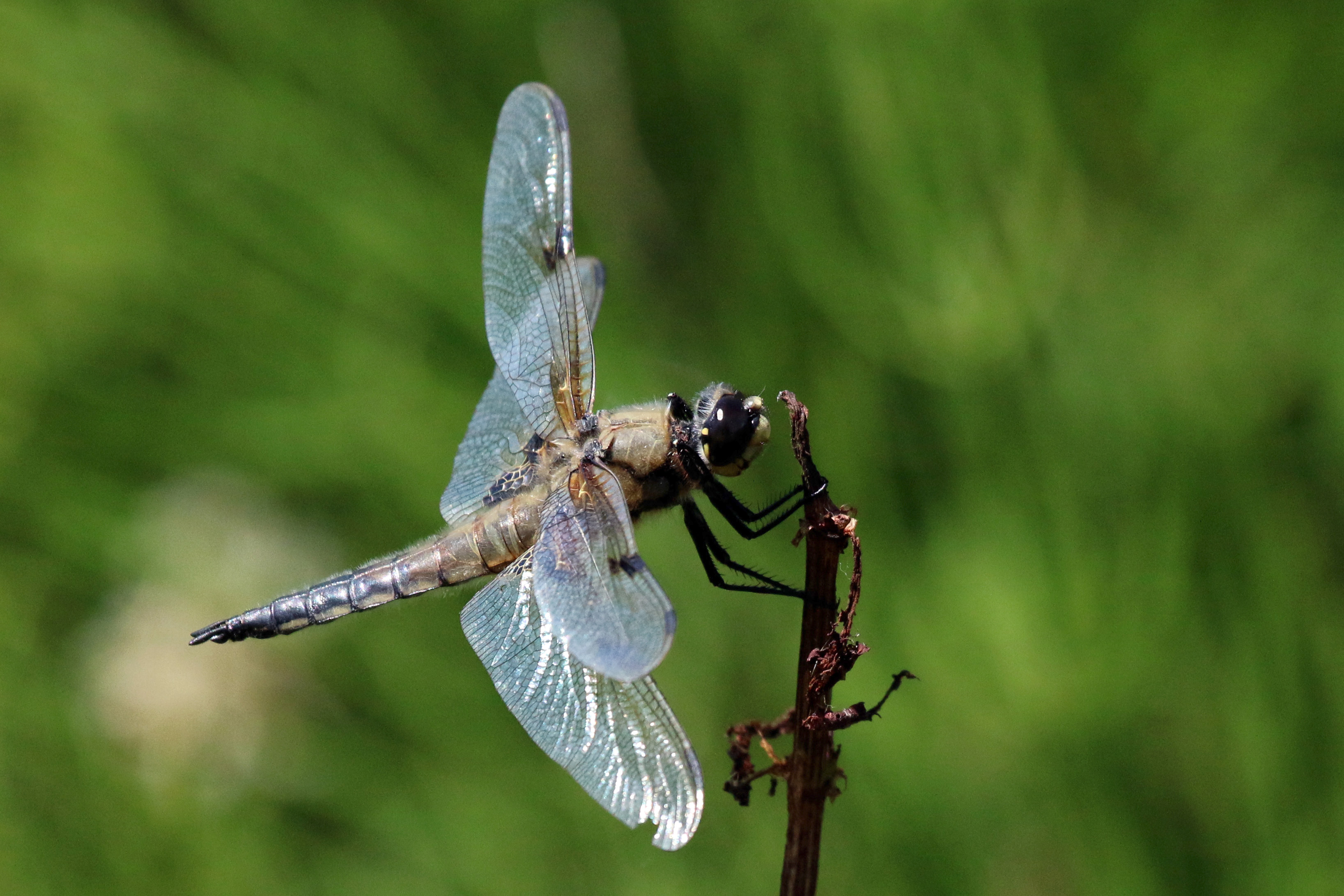
- Male; Farmoor Reservoir, Oxfordshire
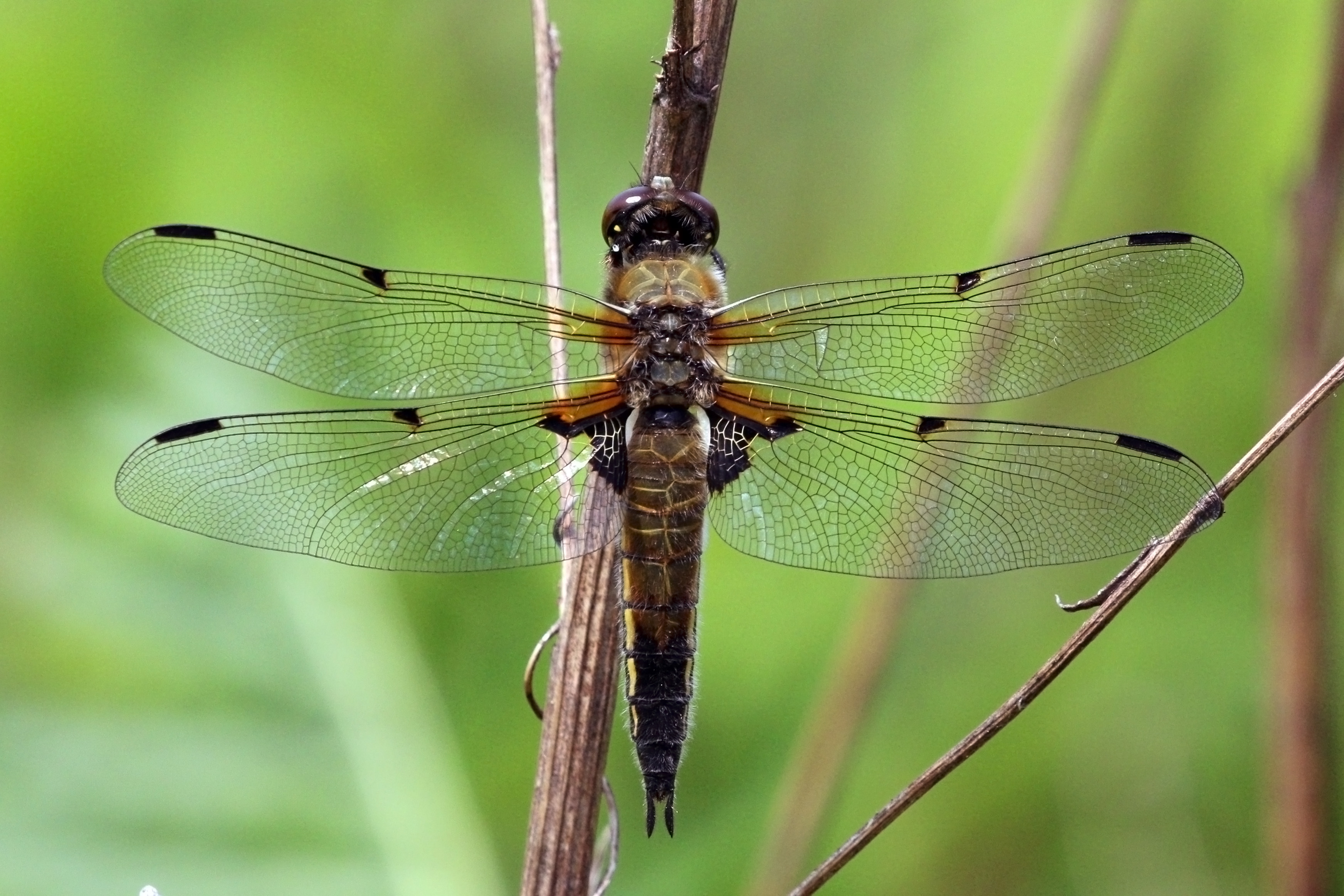
- Female, Kampinos Forest, Poland

Scientific classification
- Kingdom: Animalia
- Phylum: Arthropoda
- Class: Insecta
- Order: Odonata
- Infraorder: Anisoptera
- Family: Libellulidae
- Genus: Libellula
- Species: L. quadrimaculata

Binomial name
- Libellula quadrimaculata Linnaeus, 1758

= Four-spotted chaser =

Species of dragonfly

Libellula quadrimaculata, known in Europe as the four-spotted chaser and in North America as the four-spotted skimmer, is a dragonfly of the family Libellulidae found widely throughout Europe, Asia, and North America.

The adult stage is found between April and early September in the United Kingdom, and from mid-May to mid-August in Ireland. Larvae have a two-year developmental cycle. Adults feed predominantly on mosquitoes, gnats, and midges; the larvae feed primarily on other aquatic insect larvae and on tadpoles.

There is a variant form, praenubila Newman, which has exaggerated wing spots. This is believed to be related to water temperatures during larval development, and appears to be more common in Europe than in the Americas.

The four-spotted skimmer is the state insect of Alaska.

== Habitat ==
This active dragonfly mainly lives by ponds, vernal pools, and slow flowing rivers; they are most common in June and July.

== Identification ==
The brown colour and the four spots on the wings makes them very distinguishable but still could be confused with other Chaser Dragonflies.

== Behaviour ==
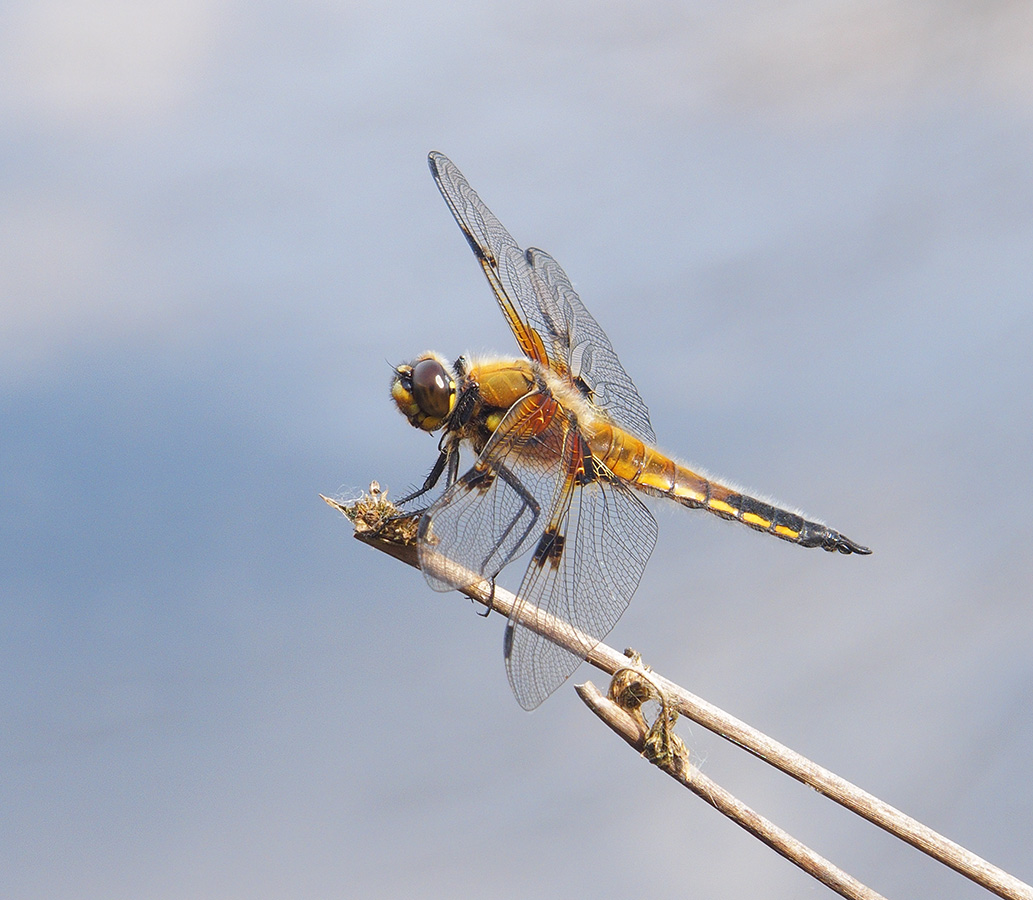
Four-spotted chaser on its perch

The male is considered to be highly aggressive and will defend a given territory from incursions from other males of the species. The male is known to form preferences for prominent perches and will often return to the same perches around the margins of pools and ponds whilst it patrols for intruders. Males have a favourable view of the sky during perching. They look toward a section of the sky away from the sun, with less radiation but a higher UV and blue-violet saturation. Thus, the fovea of the eyes, which is sensitive to blue and UV radiation, is optimally suited to the detection of flying insects against the blue sky. Both sexes are prolific fliers, and mating takes place in the air, rather than on perches or amongst the vegetation. The female lays her eggs on floating vegetation. They tend to be easier to approach than Broad-bodied Chasers.

== Predators ==
The larger emperor dragonfly (Anax imperator) is a predator of this species. Another is the green tiger beetle (Cicindela campestris).

== Gallery ==
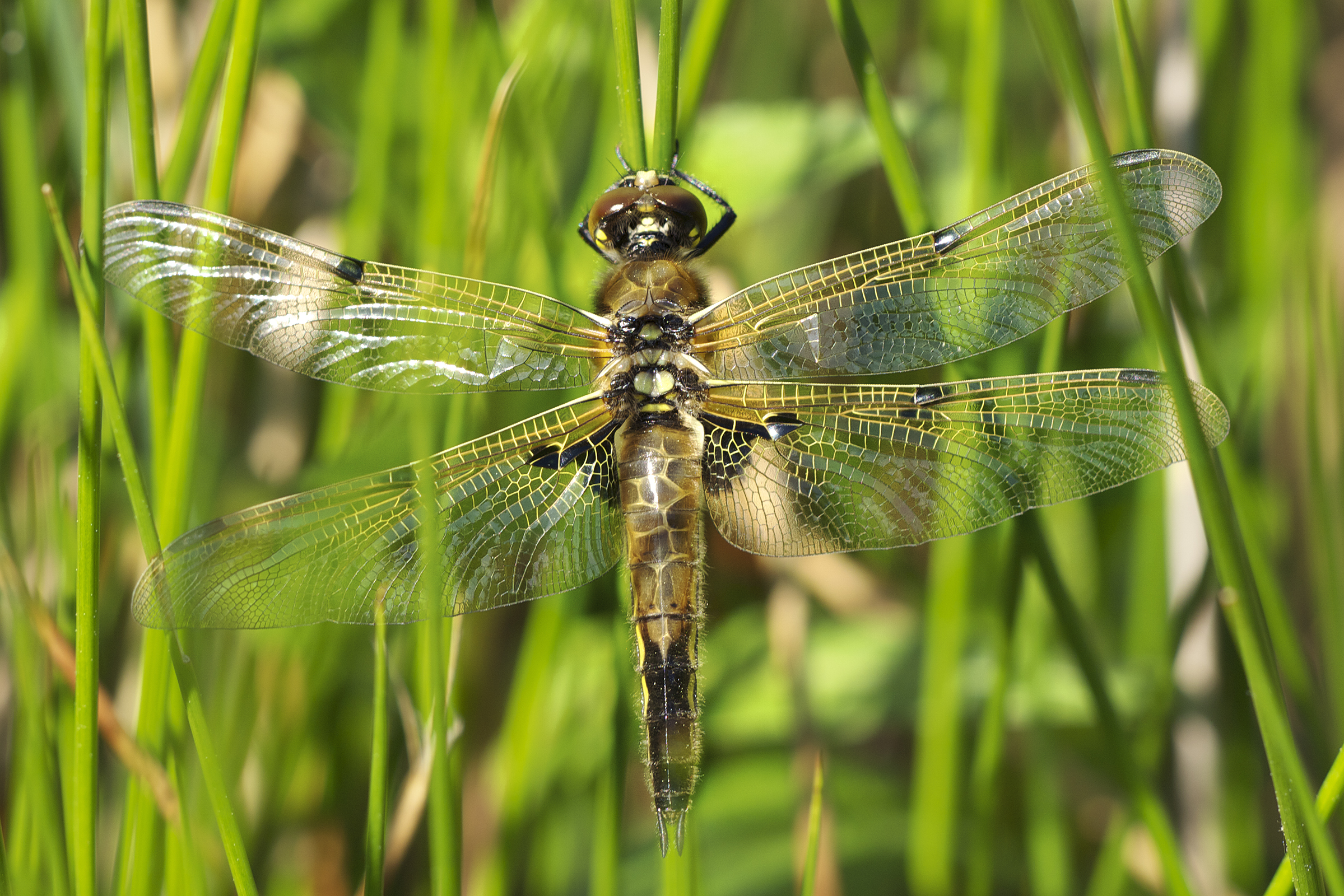
female

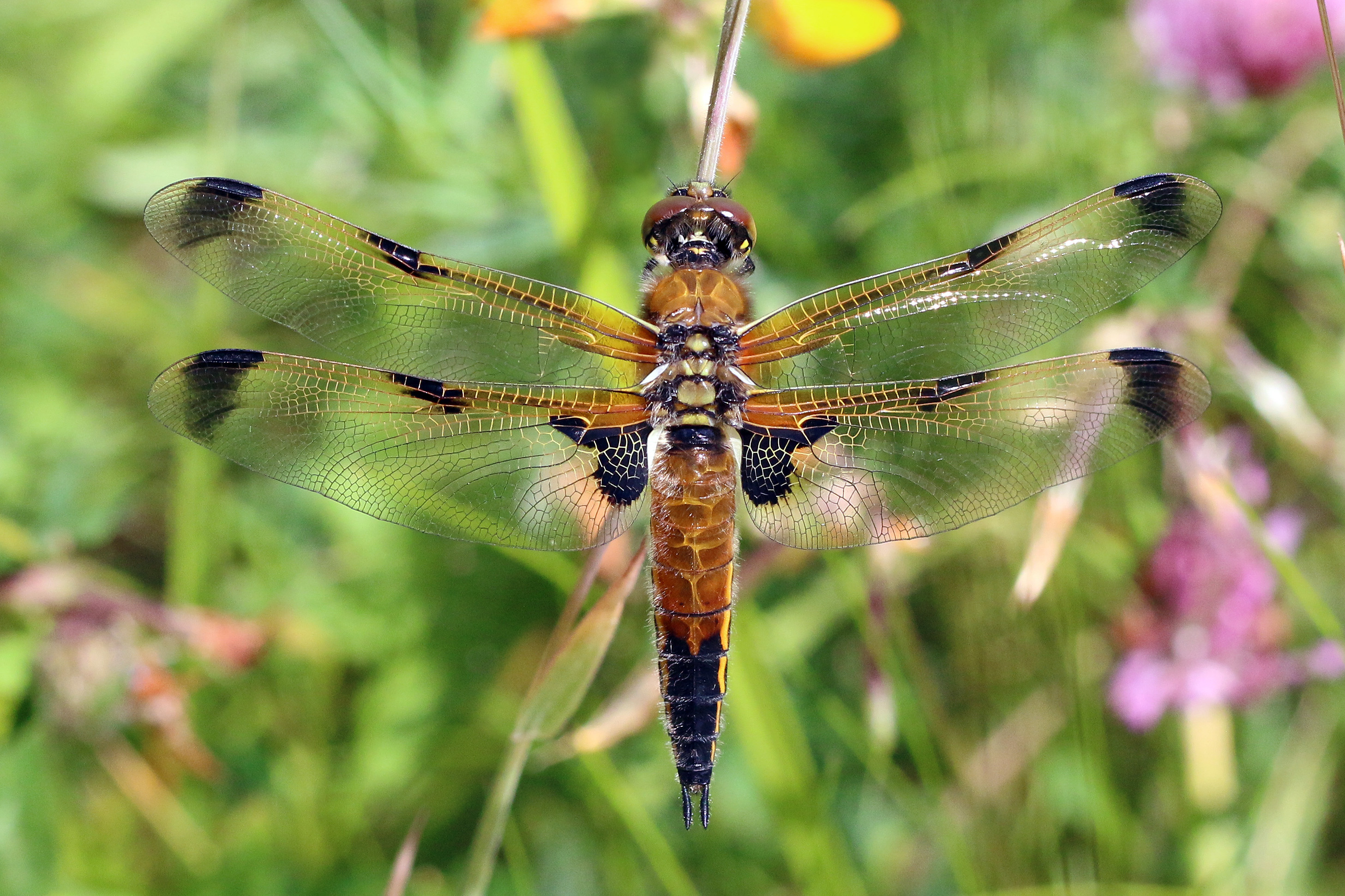
female, variant praenubila

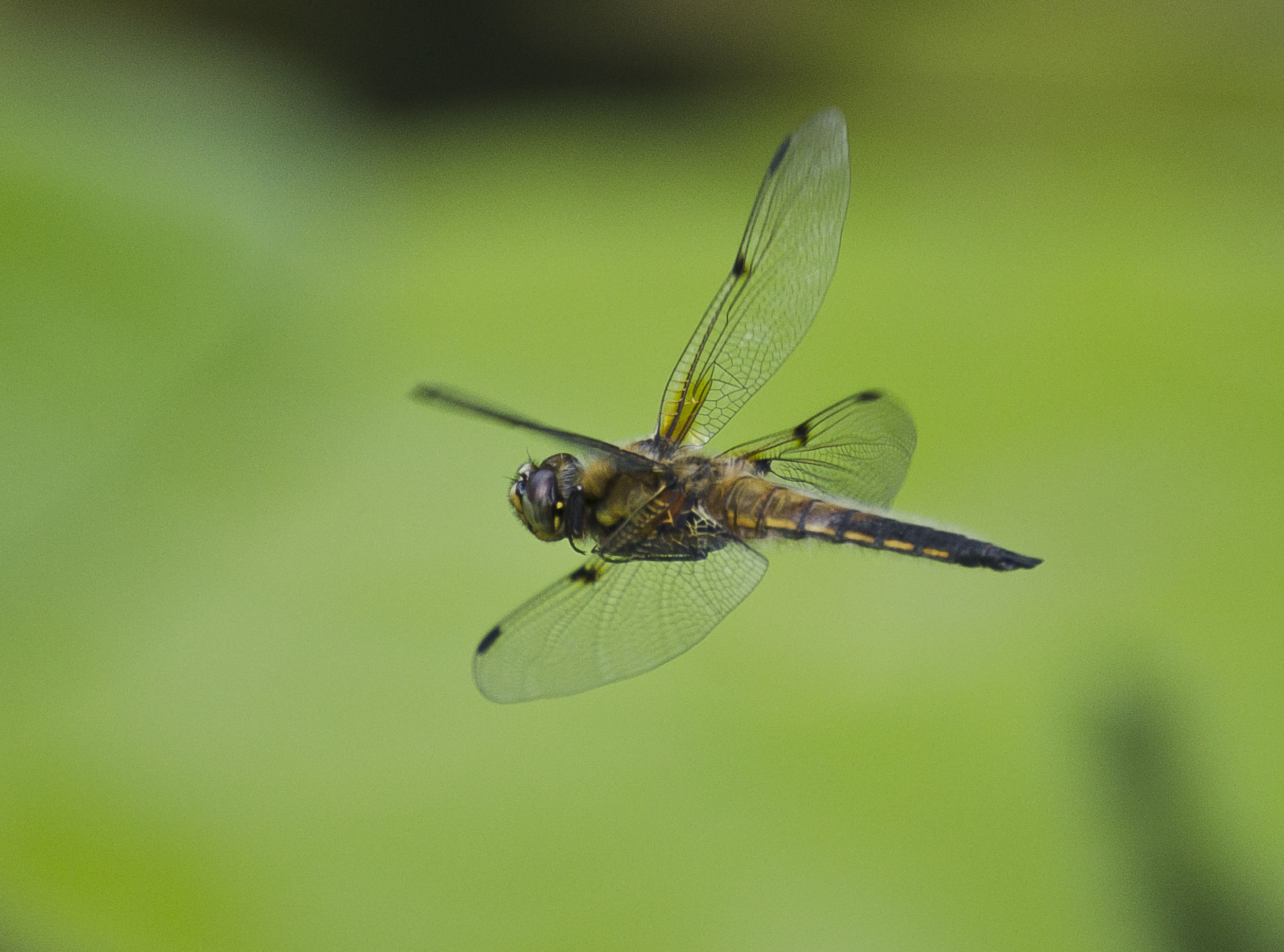
In flight

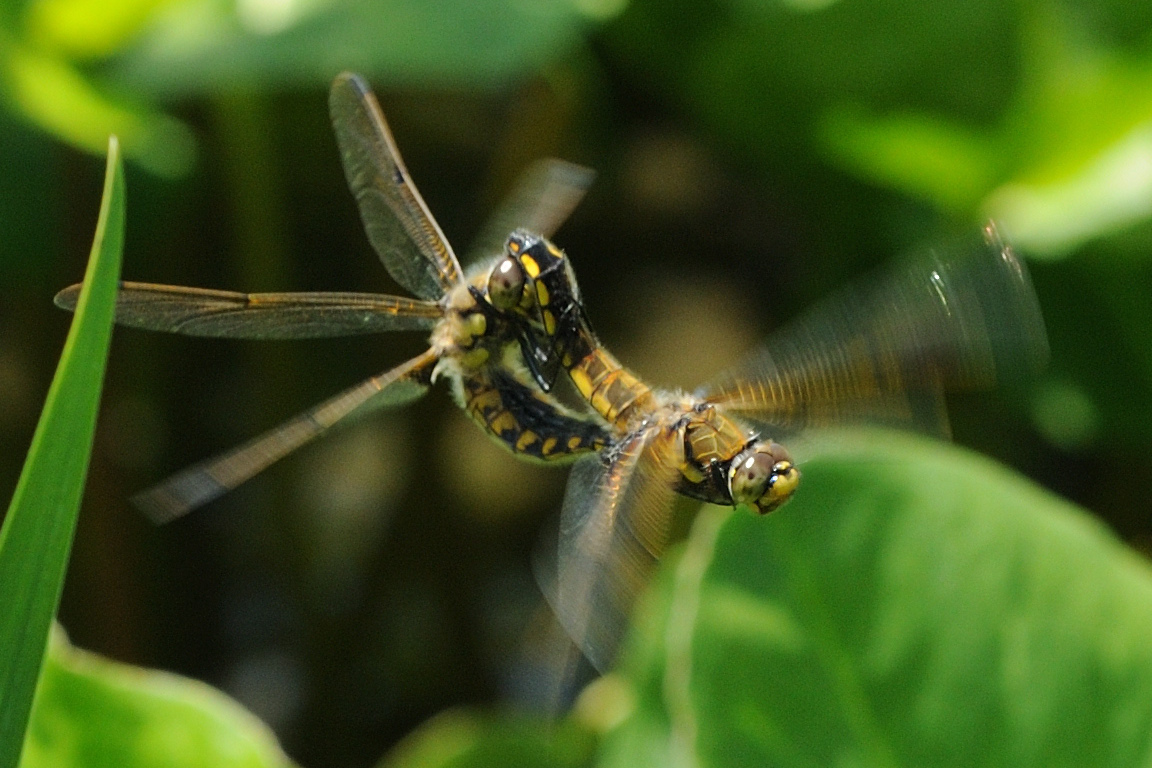
Copulation

Hunting and returning to a favoured perch at a pond
