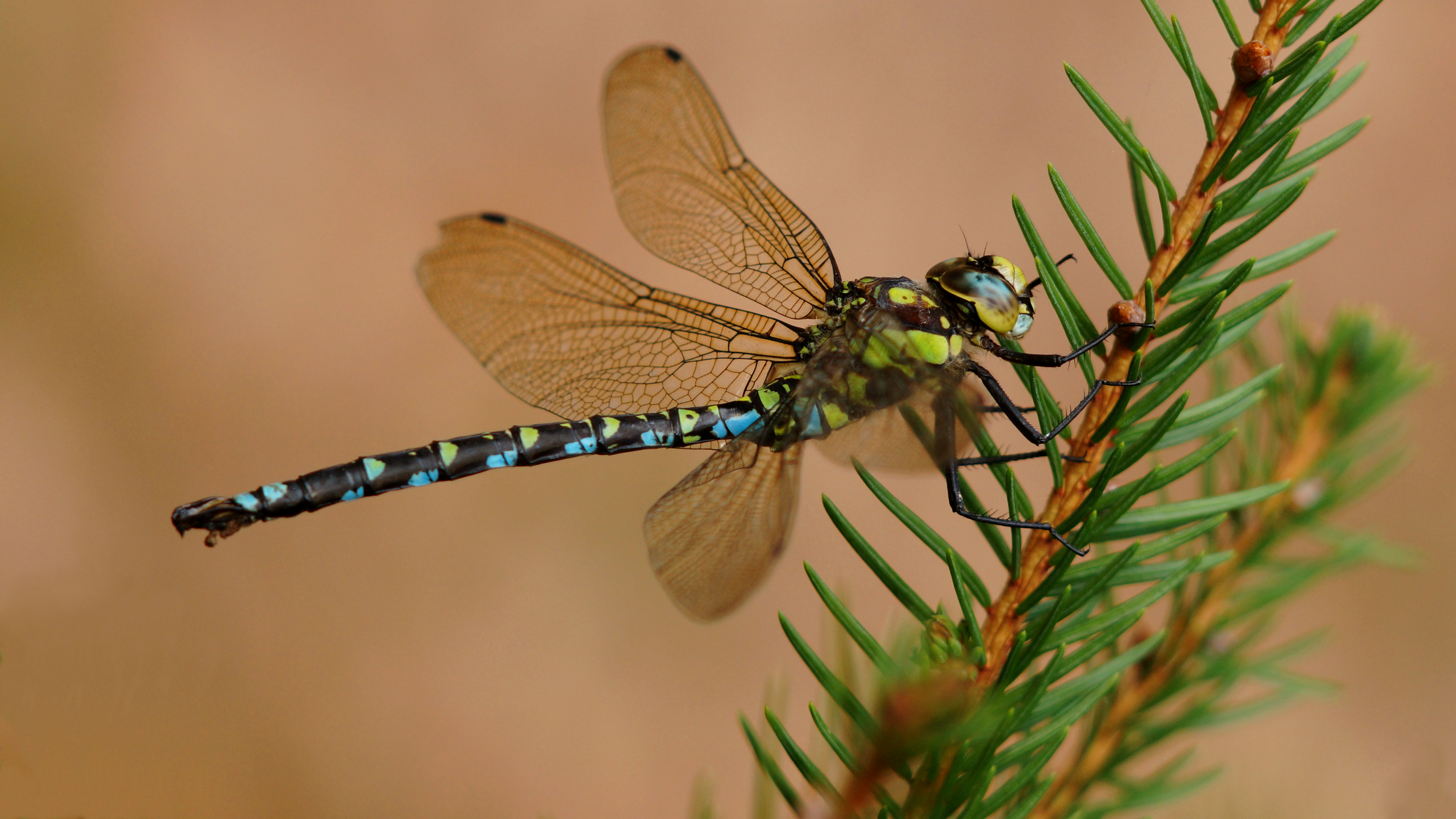
- Male, Germany
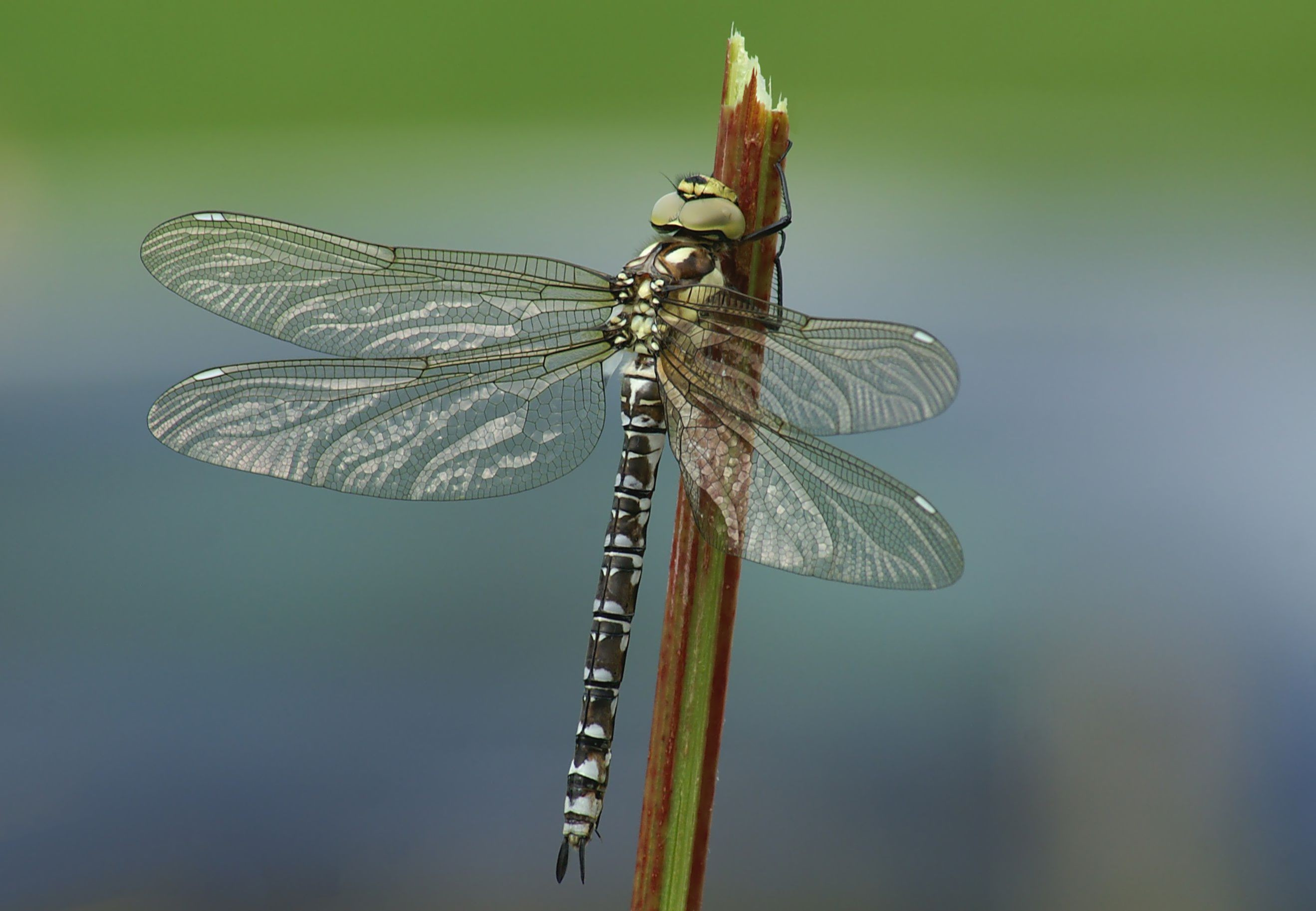
- Female

Conservation status
- Least Concern (IUCN 3.1)

Scientific classification
- Kingdom: Animalia
- Phylum: Arthropoda
- Clade: Pancrustacea
- Class: Insecta
- Order: Odonata
- Suborder: Anisoptera
- Family: Aeshnidae
- Genus: Aeshna
- Species: A. cyanea

Binomial name
- Aeshna cyanea (Müller, 1764)
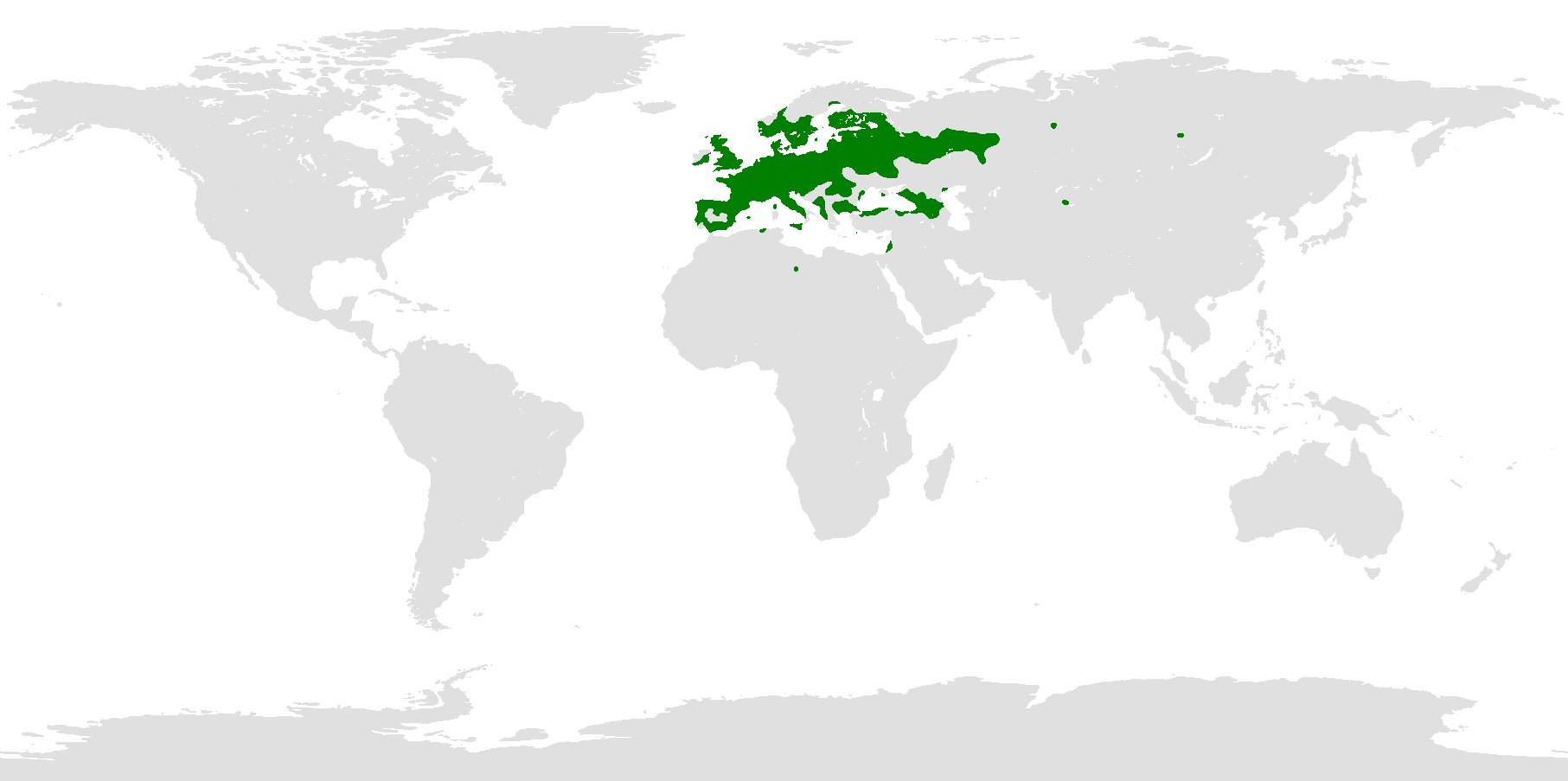
- Range of Aeshna cyanea

Synonyms
- Aeshna bicellulata Görtler, 1948; Aeshna atshischgho Bartenef, 1929; Aeshna varia (Shaw, 1806); Aeshna maculatissima Latreille, 1805; Aeshna anquis (Harris, 1782); Aeshna aenea (Sulzer, 1761)

= Southern hawker =

Species of dragonfly

The southern hawker or blue hawker (Aeshna cyanea) is a species of hawker dragonfly.

== Distribution ==
The species is one of the most common and most widespread dragonflies in Europe. The range in the Western Palearctic covers a large part of Europe, to Scotland and southern Scandinavia in the north and to Italy (without the southwest) and the northern Balkans in the south); the eastern boundary is formed by the Urals and the western by Ireland. It is also found in northwest Africa (Algeria). In Central Europe the species is very common.

== Habitat ==
These dragonflies mainly inhabit well-vegetated, small ponds and garden ponds, but they wander widely, and they are often seen in gardens and open woodland.

== Description ==
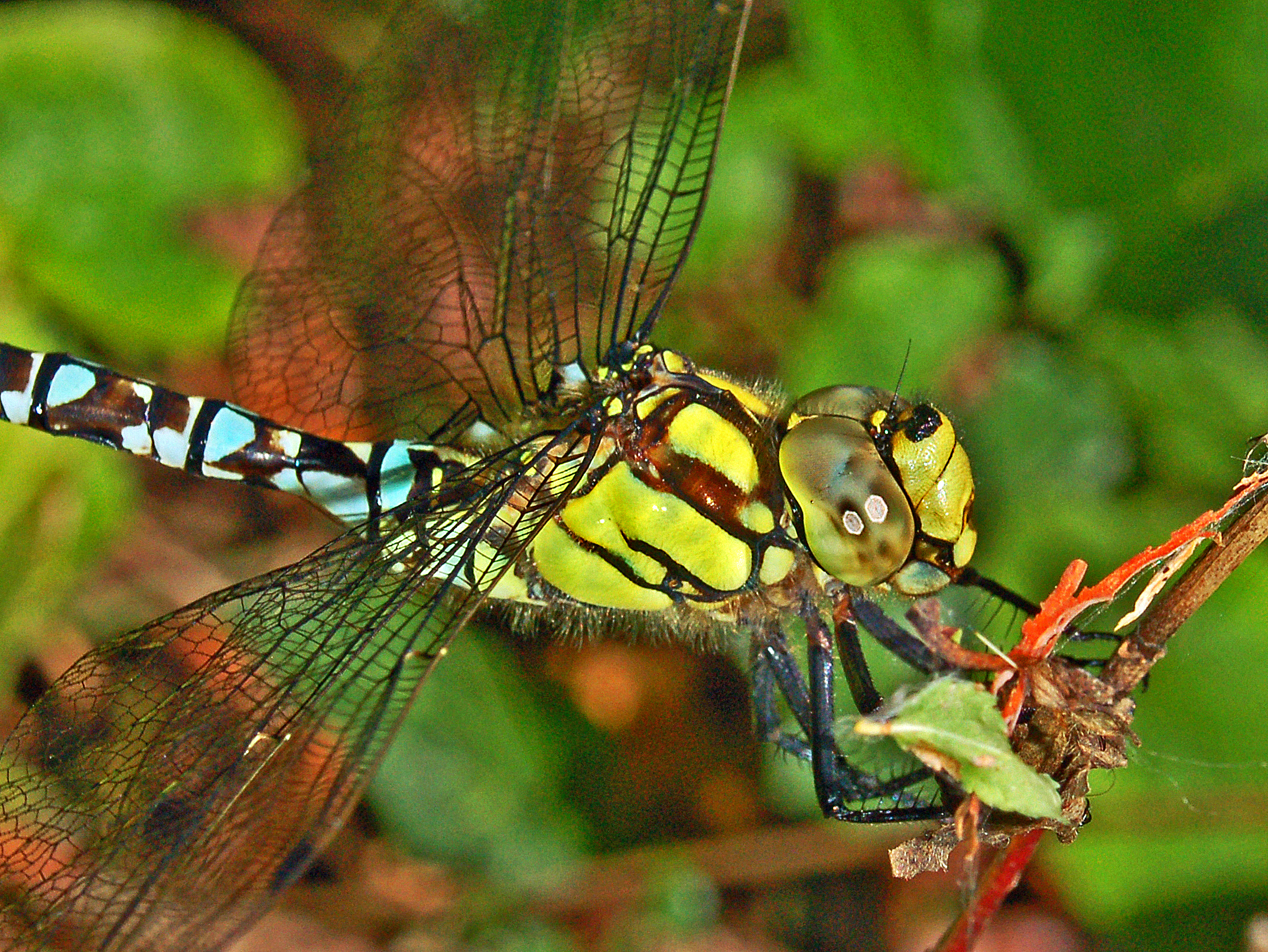
Close-up of head and thorax of a male

Aeshna cyanea can reach a body length of about 70 millimetres (2.8 in), with a wingspan up to 110 millimetres (4.3 in). It is a large, brightly coloured dragonfly, with a long body. The thorax is brown, with two ante-humeral wide green longitudinal stripes. On the forehead there is a black spot in the form of the letter T. The wings are hyaline with a dark pterostigma. The leading edge of the wings is dark.

Males have a dark abdomen with bright apple green markings, except for the last segments S8-10 of the abdomen, where the markings are pale blue and joined. In the females, the abdomen is brownish with bright green markings. The eyes of the males have a gradient, fading from green on the bottom to blue or greenish-blue at the top, while in the females they are yellowish green or brownish.

== Biology and behaviour ==
Flight period of these insects lasts from June to October, with some specimen visible in May and November. The adults of the southern hawker feed on various insects, caught on the wing. This is an inquisitive species and will approach people.

These dragonflies breed in still or slow-flowing water. The males are often seen patrolling by a ponds edge or river, where they fight away intruders, crashing into rival males and spiralling through the air. The females are quite inconspicuous when they lay their eggs, but they sometimes give away their spot by clattering up from the reeds.

The eggs are laid by jabbing the abdomen into rotting vegetation or wood. The eggs hatch in the spring, after being laid in the previous summer or autumn. The nymphs feed on aquatic insects, small tadpoles, invertebrates and small fish. They emerge as adults in July and August after two to three years' development.

While looking quite imposing with its relatively large size and voracious appetite for other insects, the southern hawker is completely harmless to humans. Dragonflies sometimes are observed where the Cercus at the end of their abdomen are mistaken for claws or a stinger, however Dragonflies do not have the ability to sting. southern hawkers, especially the males, are very active fliers and can also be quite inquisitive. Southern hawkers can be observed flying hundreds of metres away from their natural habitat flying around open fields, parks, hiking trails, or populated streets, even sometimes flying close to humans, however they generally shy away from getting very close and do not attack humans in any way, unlike wasps or hornets when they feel threatened.

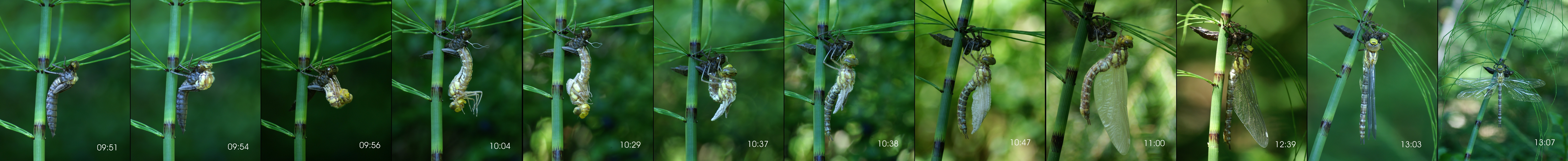
Moulting phase of Aeshna cyanea

== Life cycle ==
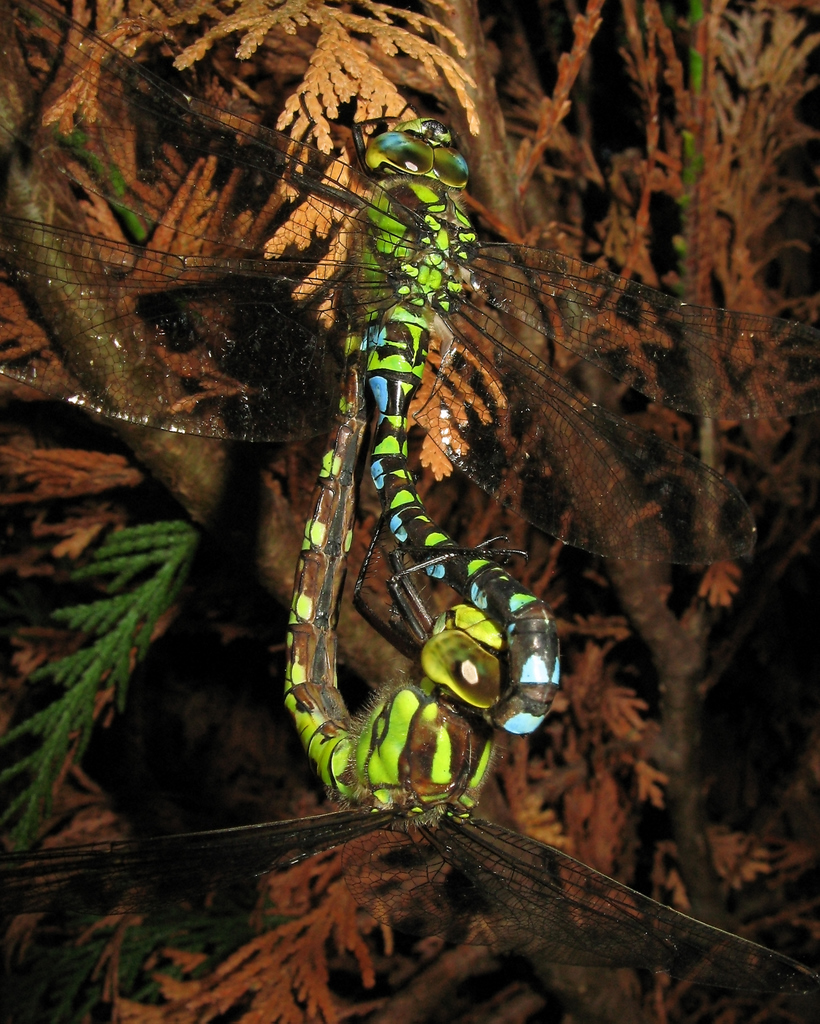
Mating

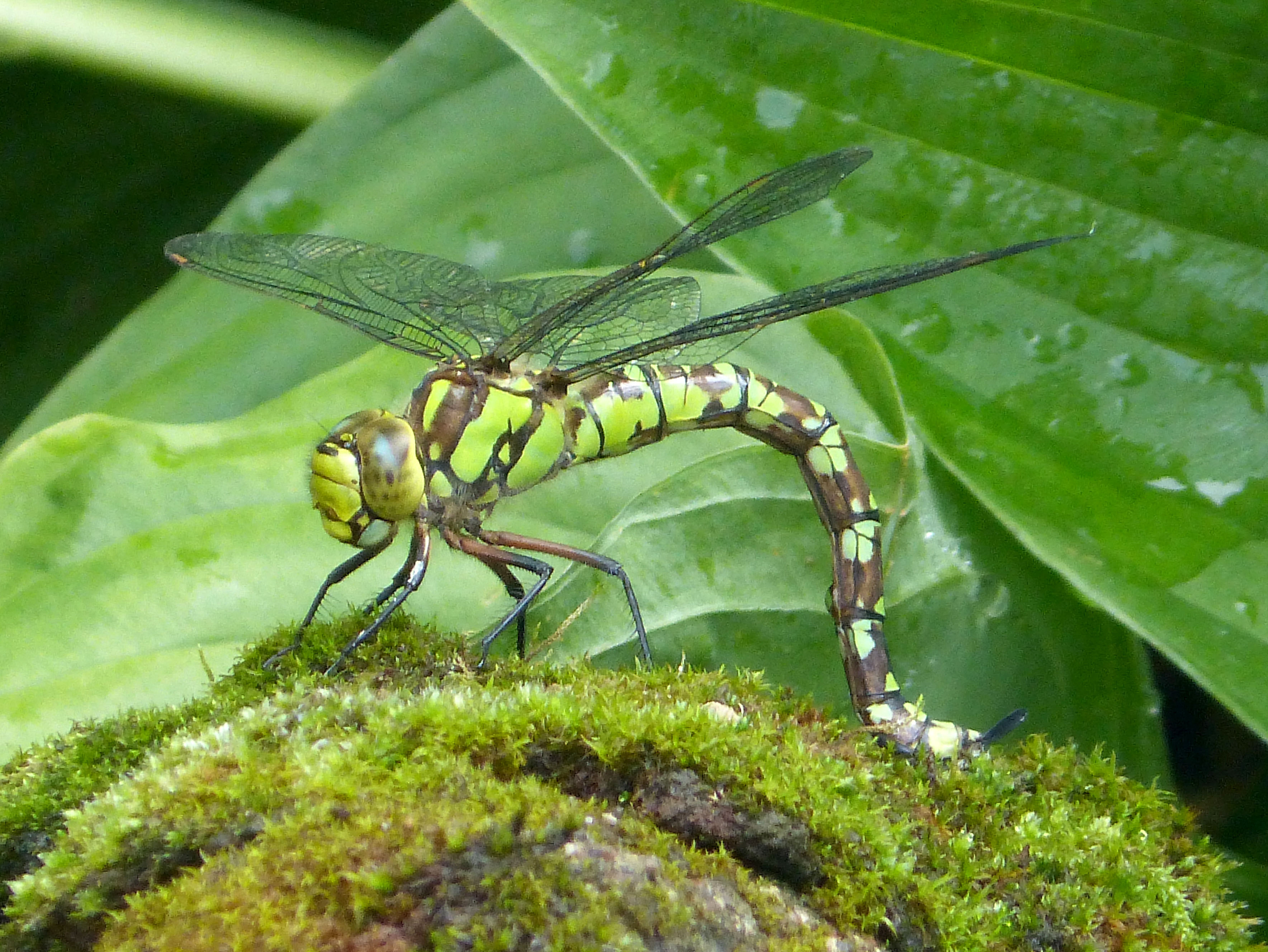
Female ovipositing

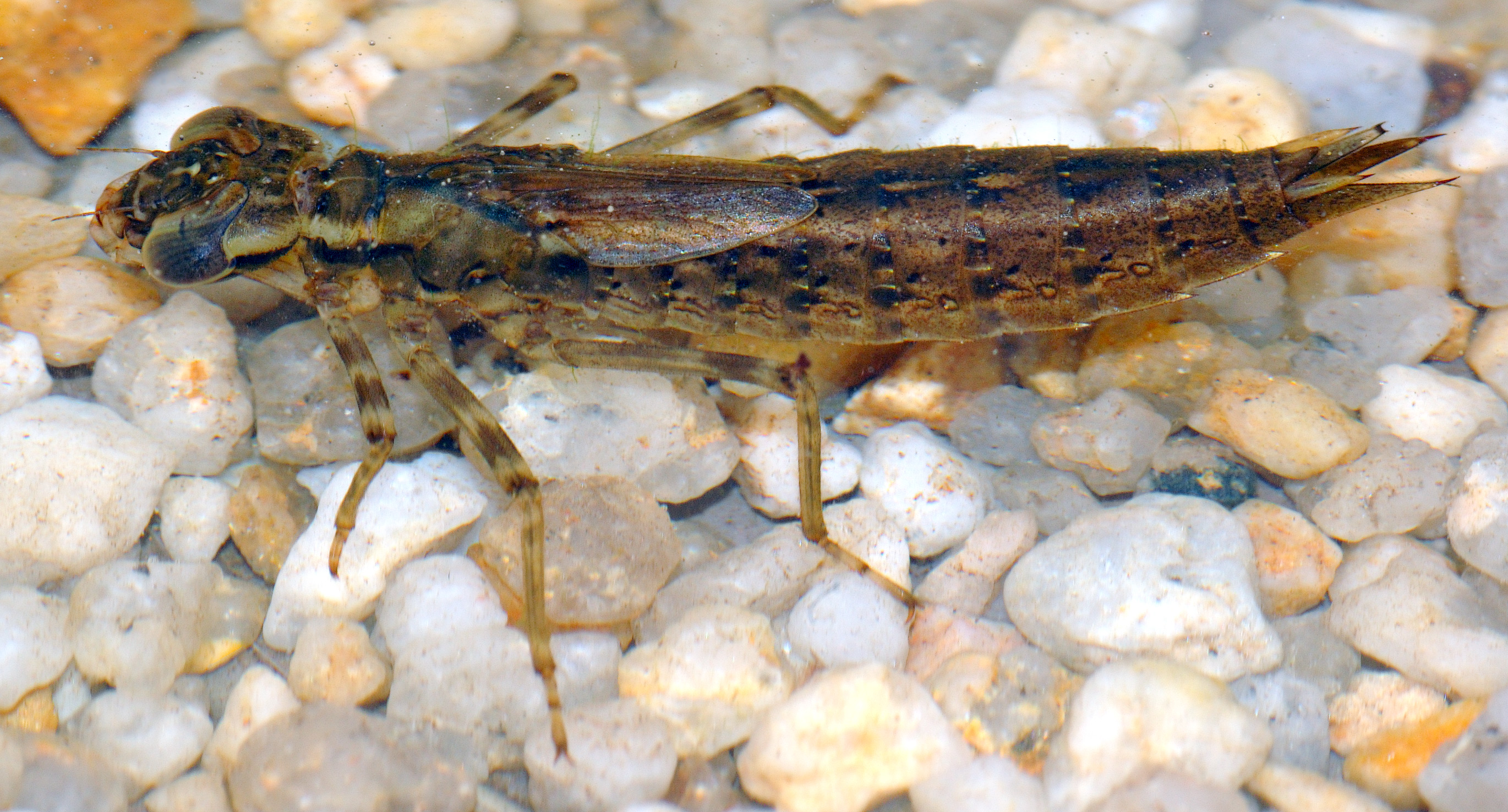
Larva

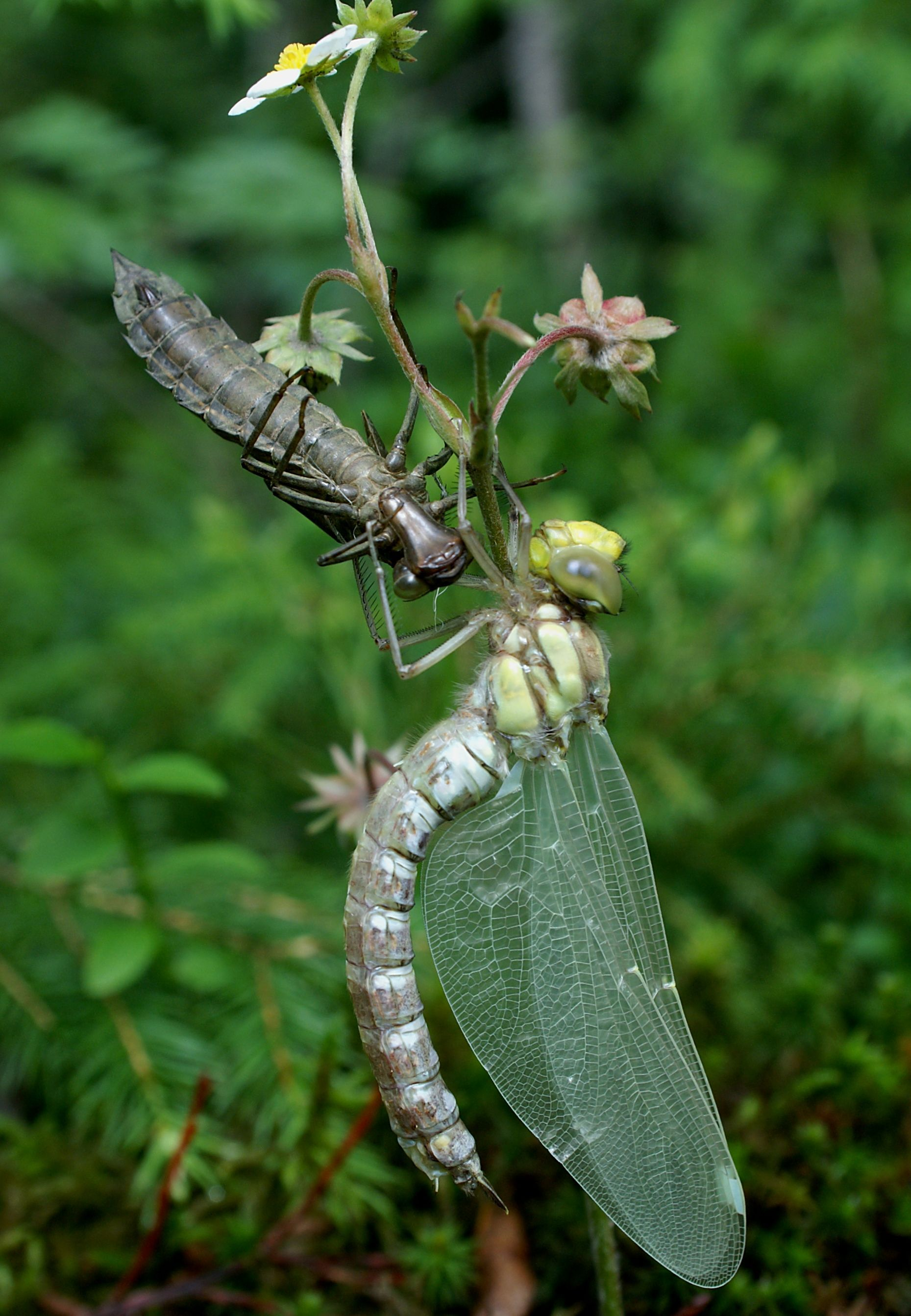
Female freshly emerged with larva skin

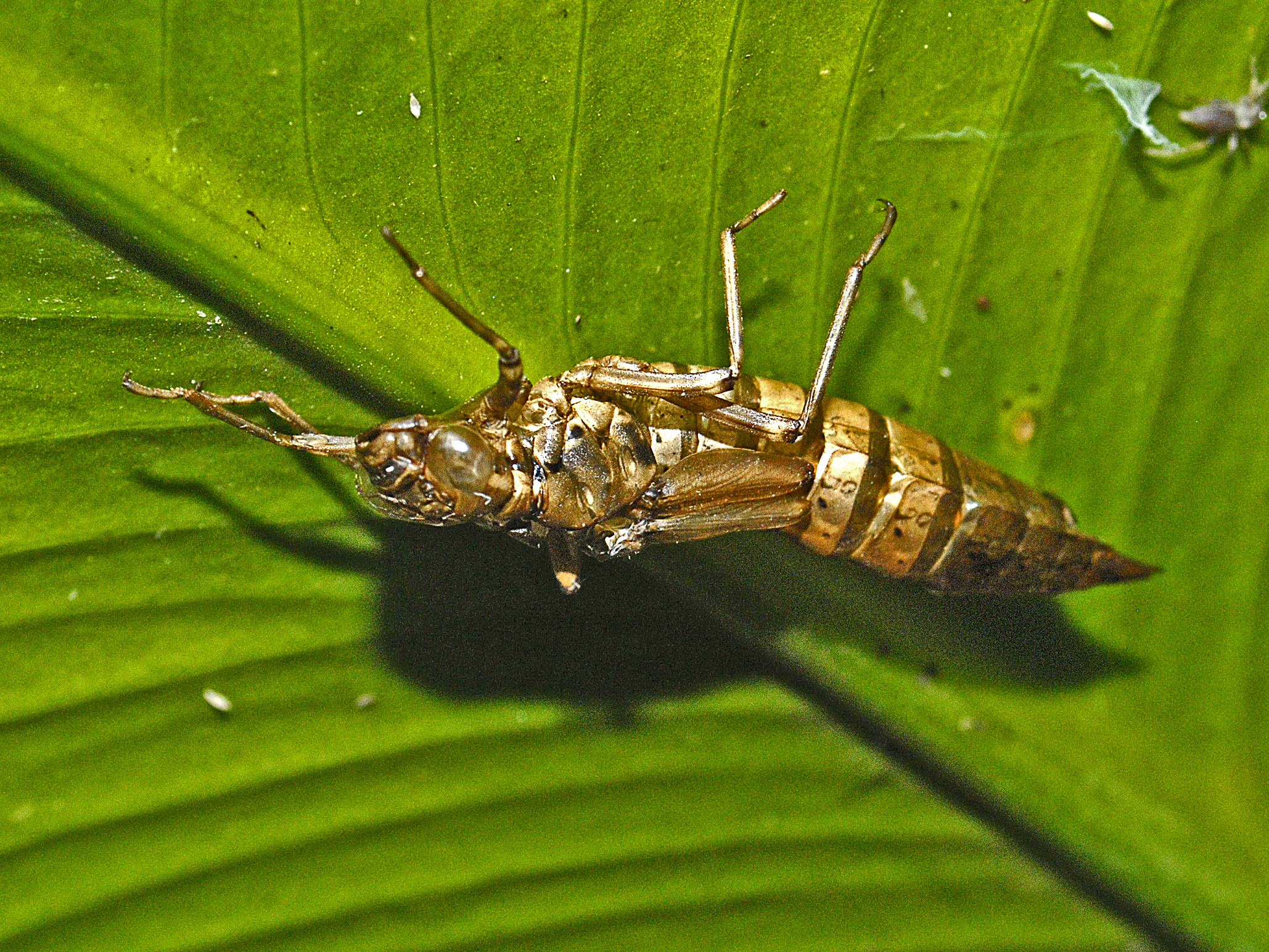
Exuvia

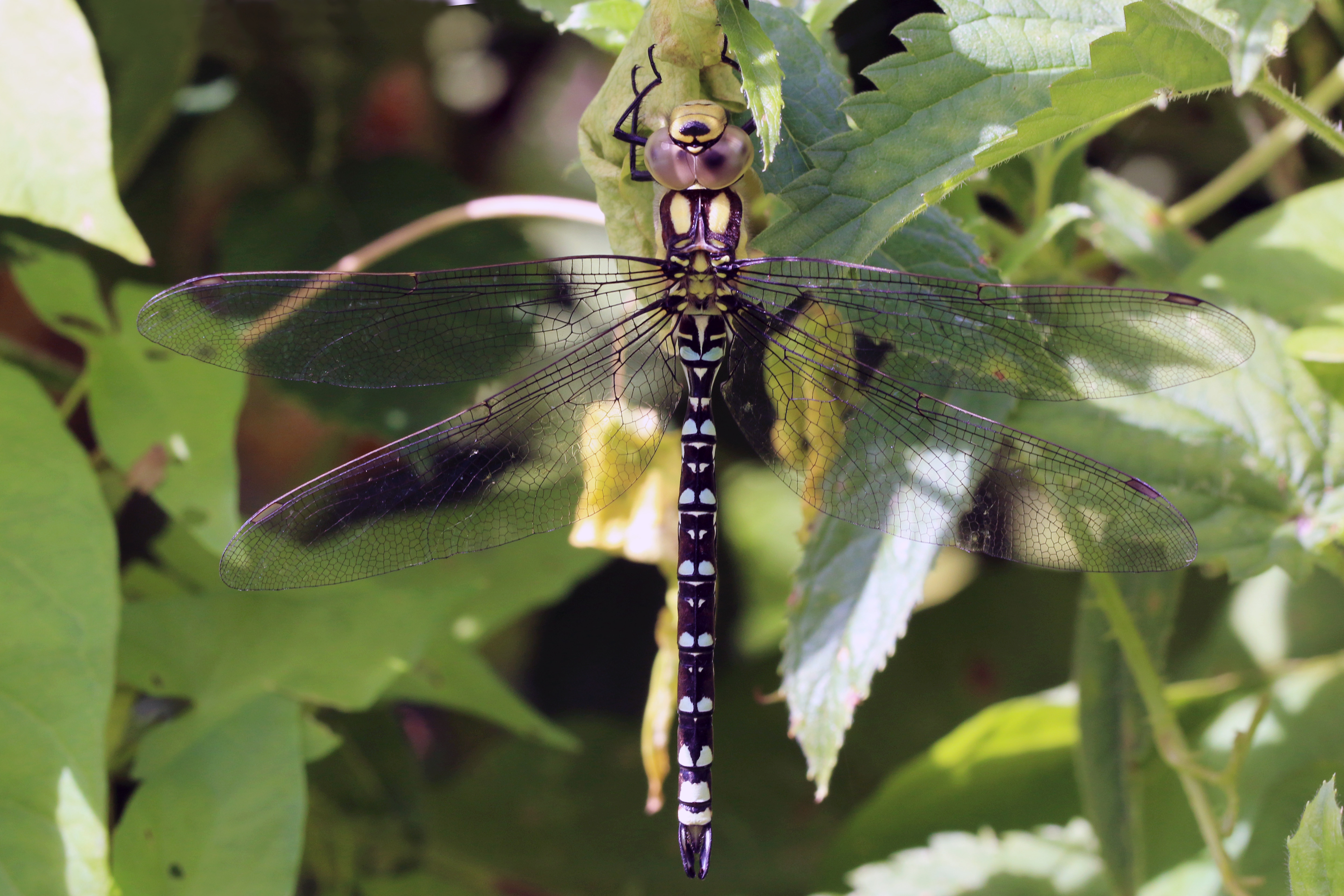
Immature male

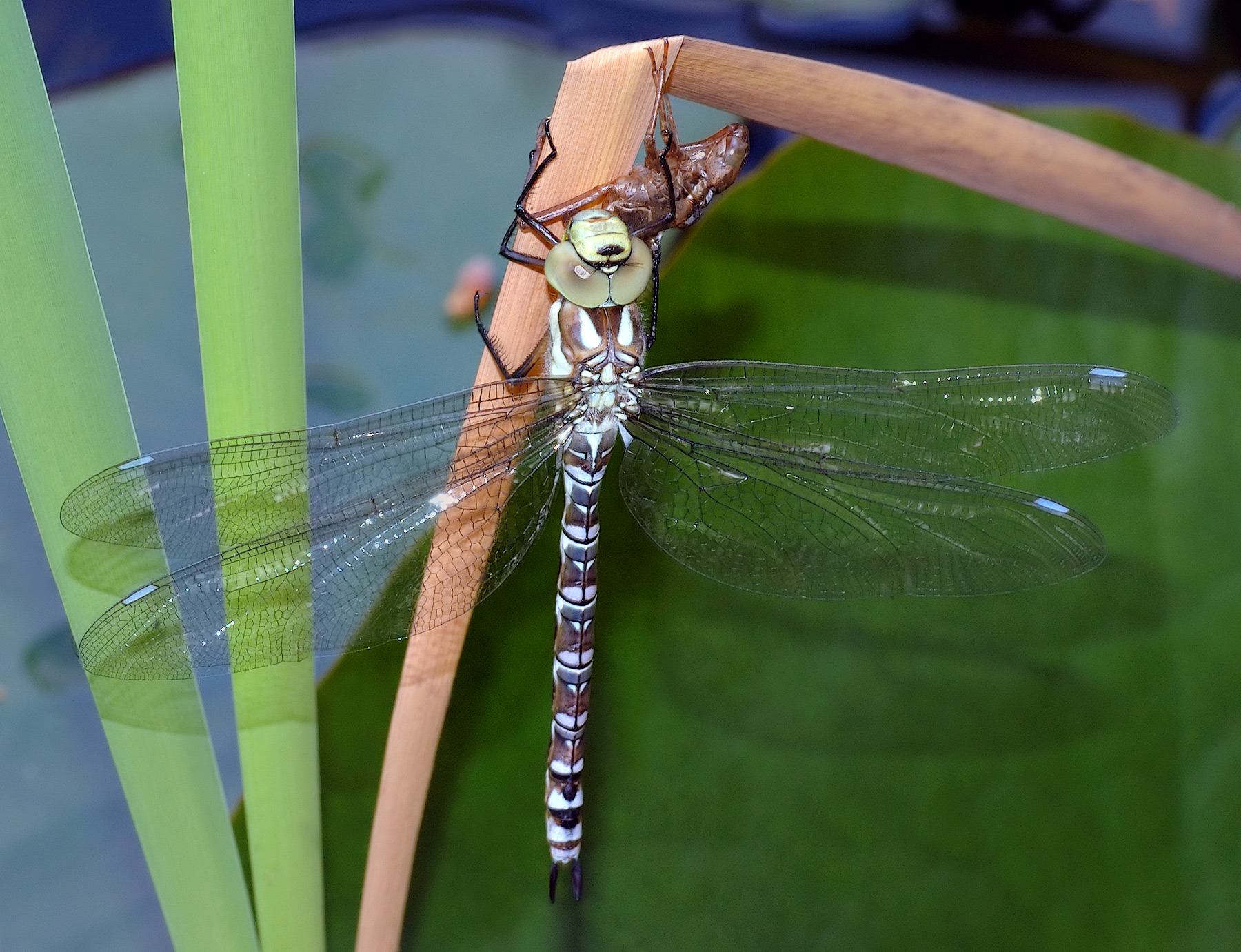
Immature female

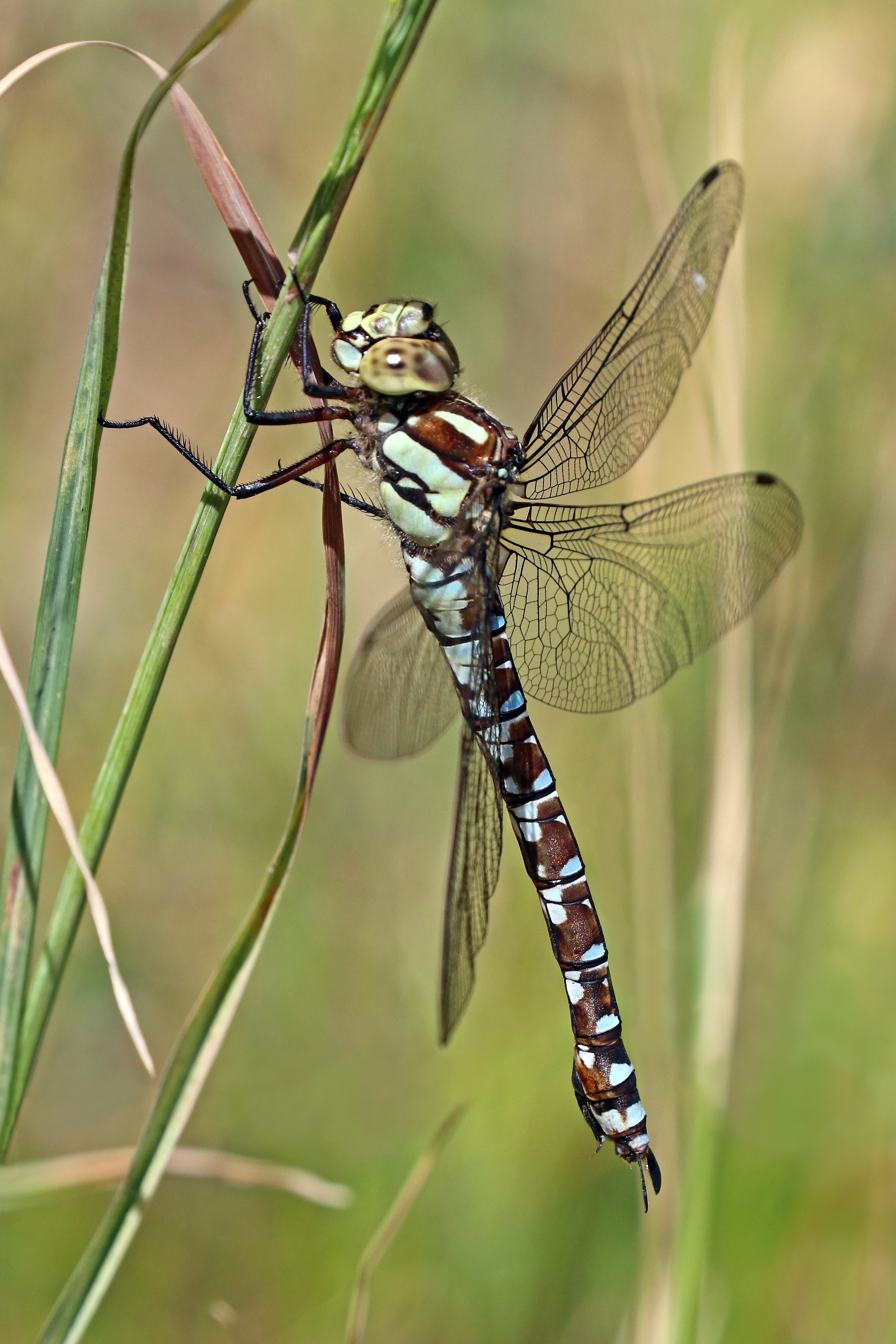
mature male, blue form

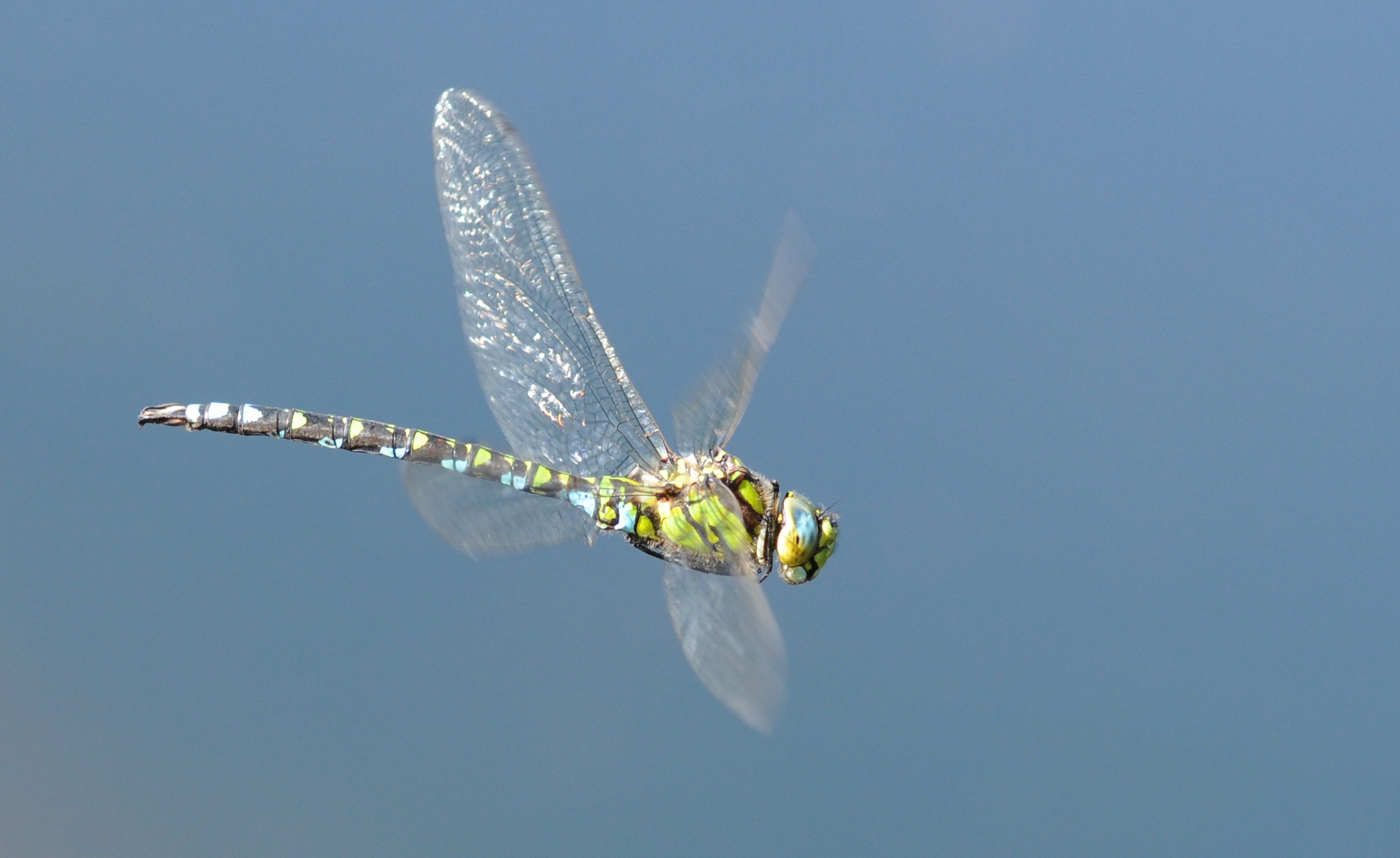
In flight

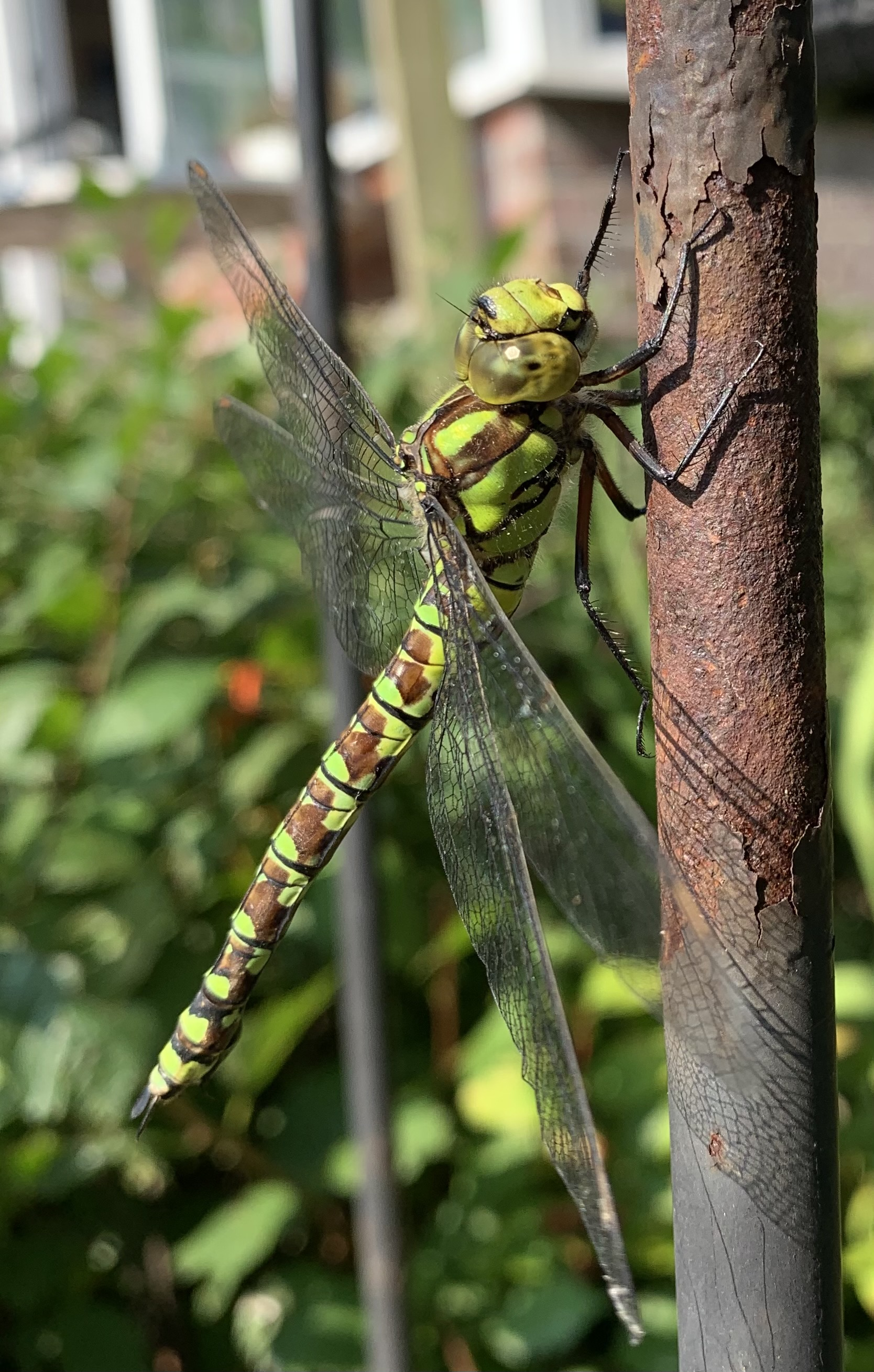
Mature female

Female eats a wasp

Mature male grooming (8x slow-motion)

== See also ==
- List of British dragonflies
- Schorr, M. and Paulson, D. 2015. World Odonata List. Tacoma, Washington, USA .
