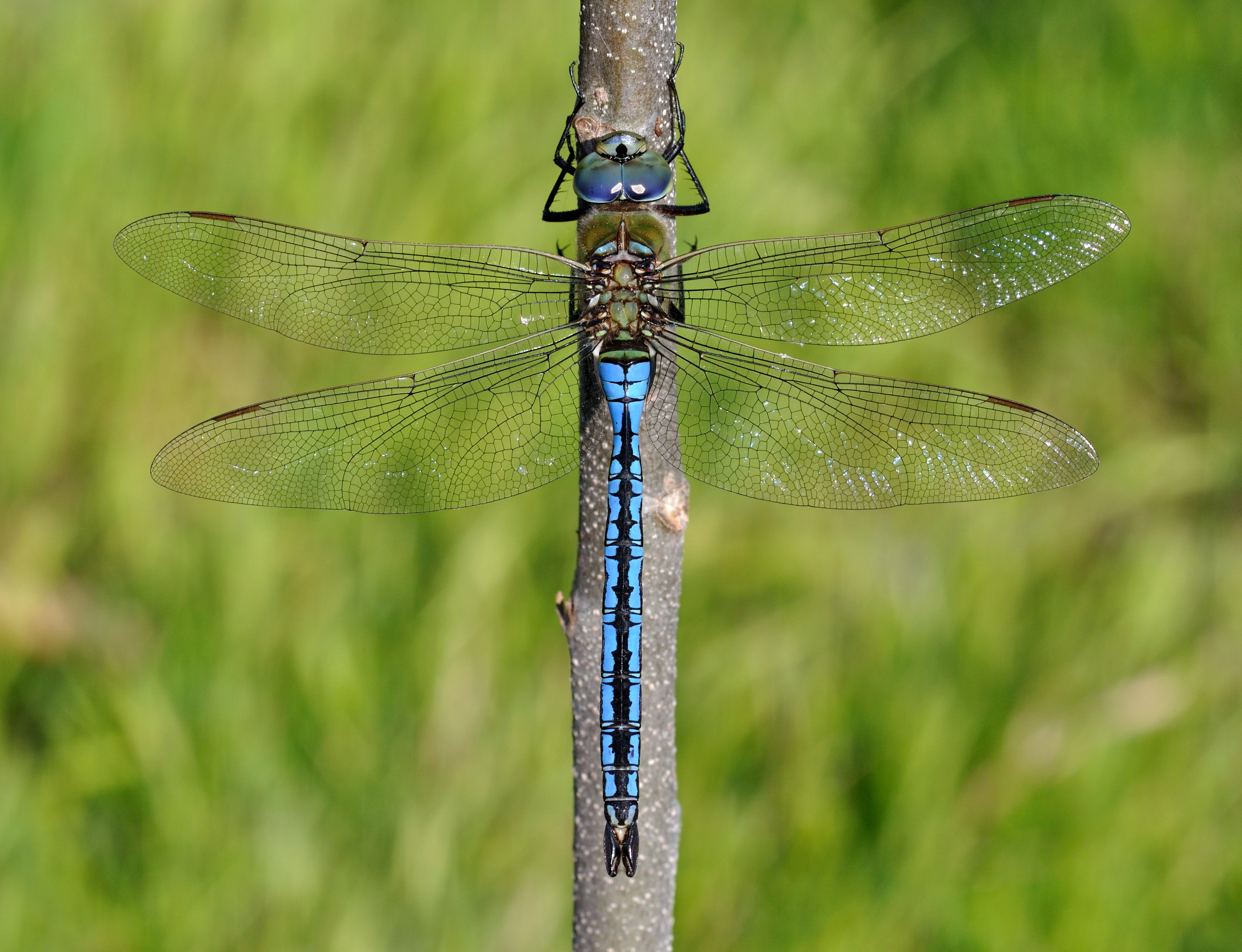
- Male; Tenerife, Spain
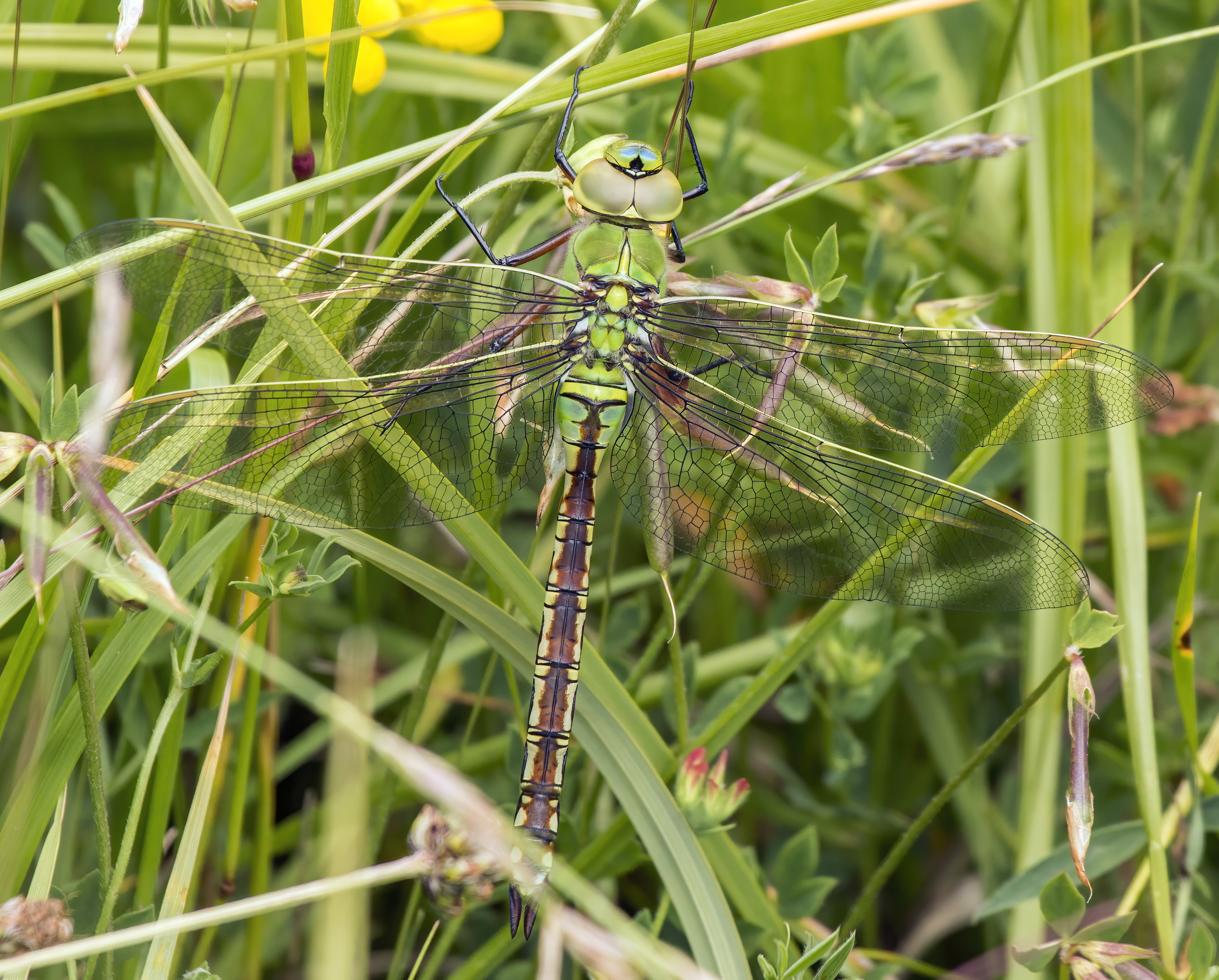
- Female; Oxfordshire, England

Conservation status
- Least Concern (IUCN 3.1)

Scientific classification
- Kingdom: Animalia
- Phylum: Arthropoda
- Clade: Pancrustacea
- Class: Insecta
- Order: Odonata
- Suborder: Anisoptera
- Family: Aeshnidae
- Genus: Anax
- Species: A. imperator

Binomial name
- Anax imperator Leach, 1815

Synonyms
- Anax formosa Vander Linden, 1823; Anax mauricianus Rambur, 1842; Aeschna azurea Charpentier, 1825; Aeschna lunata Kolenati, 1856

= Emperor dragonfly =

Species of dragonfly

The emperor dragonfly or blue emperor (Anax imperator) is a large species of hawker dragonfly of the family Aeshnidae. It is the largest dragonfly in most of Europe, including the United Kingdom, although exceeded in some areas by other species.

== Nomenclature ==
The generic name Anax is from the ancient Greek ἄναξ, "lord"; the specific epithet imperator is the Latin for "emperor", from imperare, to command.

== Distribution ==
This dragonfly has a wide distribution through Afroeurasia; it is found throughout Africa and through most of Europe, the Arabian Peninsula, and south-western and central Asia. Since the 1990s, its range has expanded in Europe, both northwards and to higher altitudes. For example, the first Scandinavian record was in 1994 in Denmark; in 2002 it was first recorded in Sweden and in 2004 first in Scotland; today it is regular in all three countries. The species' northward expansion has been tied to global warming, and it is among the first odonata to do so.

== Identification ==
The emperor dragonfly is a large and bulky species. It is 73–82 mm (2.9–3.2 in) long, with average being 78 mm (3.1 in) and males growing larger than females. The average wingspan is 104 mm (4.1 in). When they first emerge, both sexes appear pale green with brown markings. The legs are brown with a yellow like base. Wings are born black but grow yellow-brown when they grow. Males have a bright sky blue or turquoise abdomen marked with a diagnostic black dorsal stripe. However, their blue colour may be faded during cold weather spells. The thorax and head of a male is apple green and their prominent eyes are blue. Females have similar markings but they are mainly a duller green. As the females age, their wings become browner. Less immediately visible features for both sexes are the yellow costa and brown spots on the wings. Emperor dragonflies can also be recognised by their flight patterns: they often fly with their abdomen hanging slightly downwards.

One of the largest species in Europe, the emperor dragonfly is exceeded by magnificent emperor, which occurs only marginally in the east Mediterranean and in length by females of the golden-ringed dragonfly, a species with an unusually long ovipositor. Thus, in most of Europe the emperor is the largest dragonfly species present.

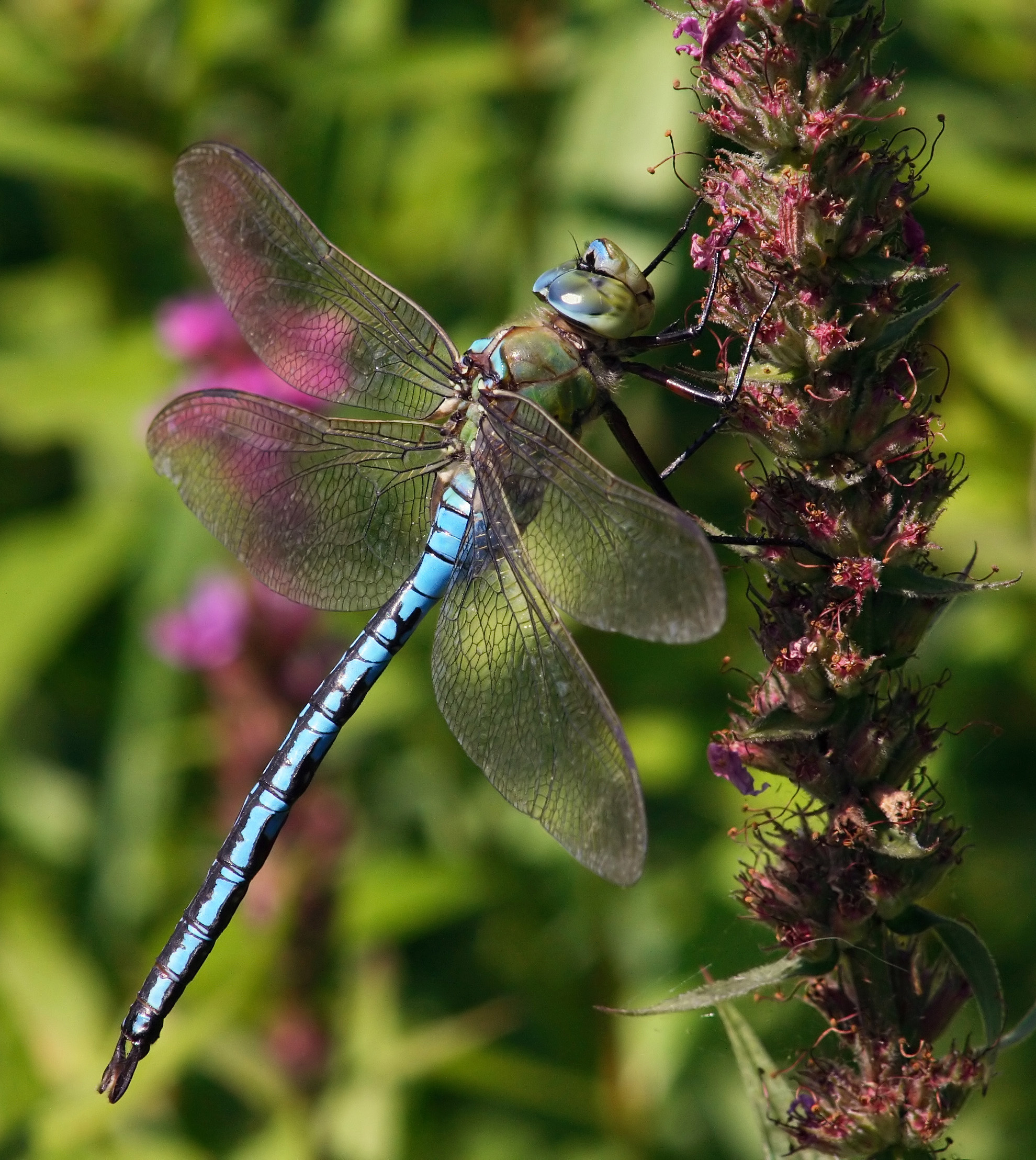
Male in side view

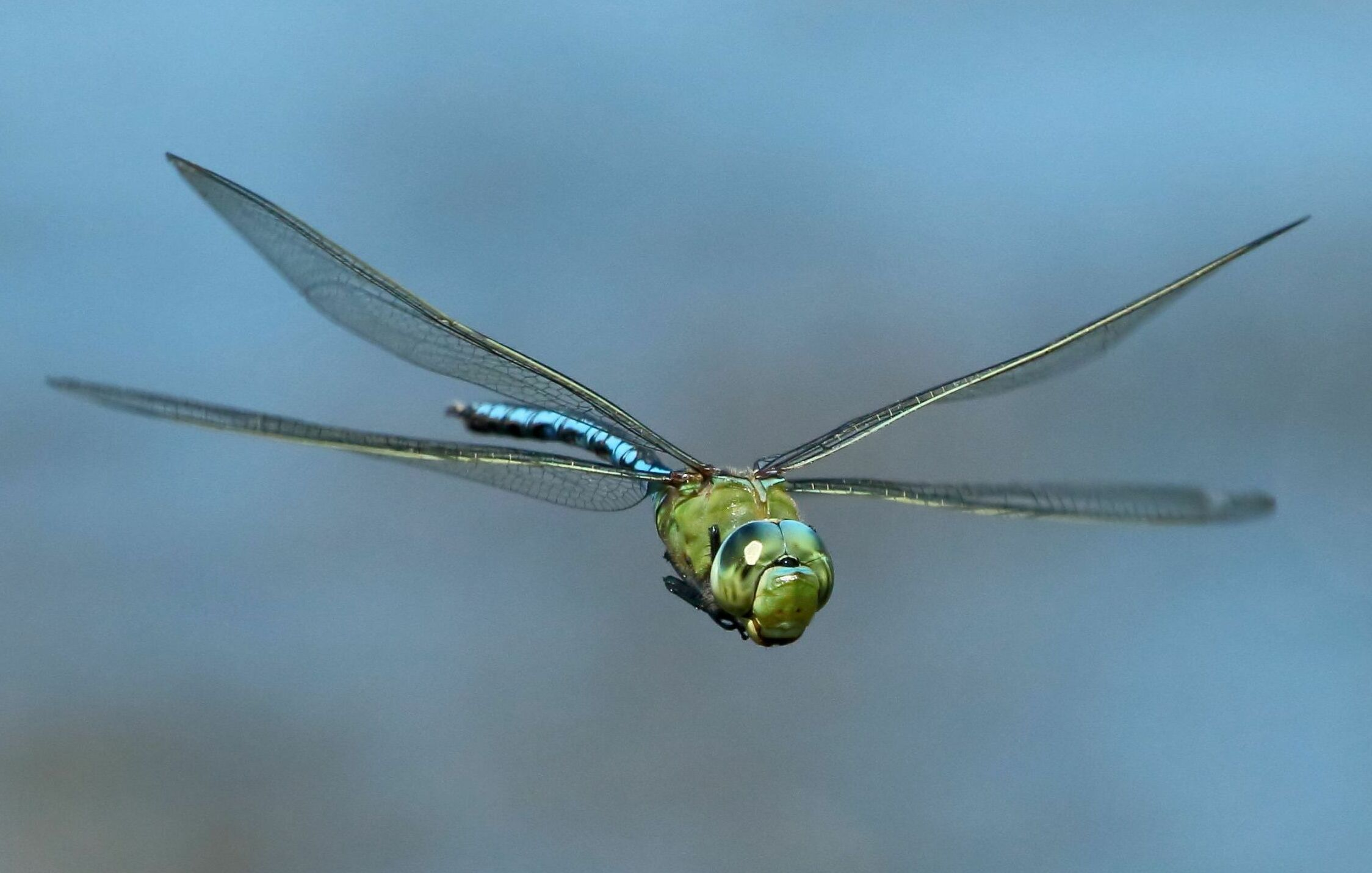
Male in flight

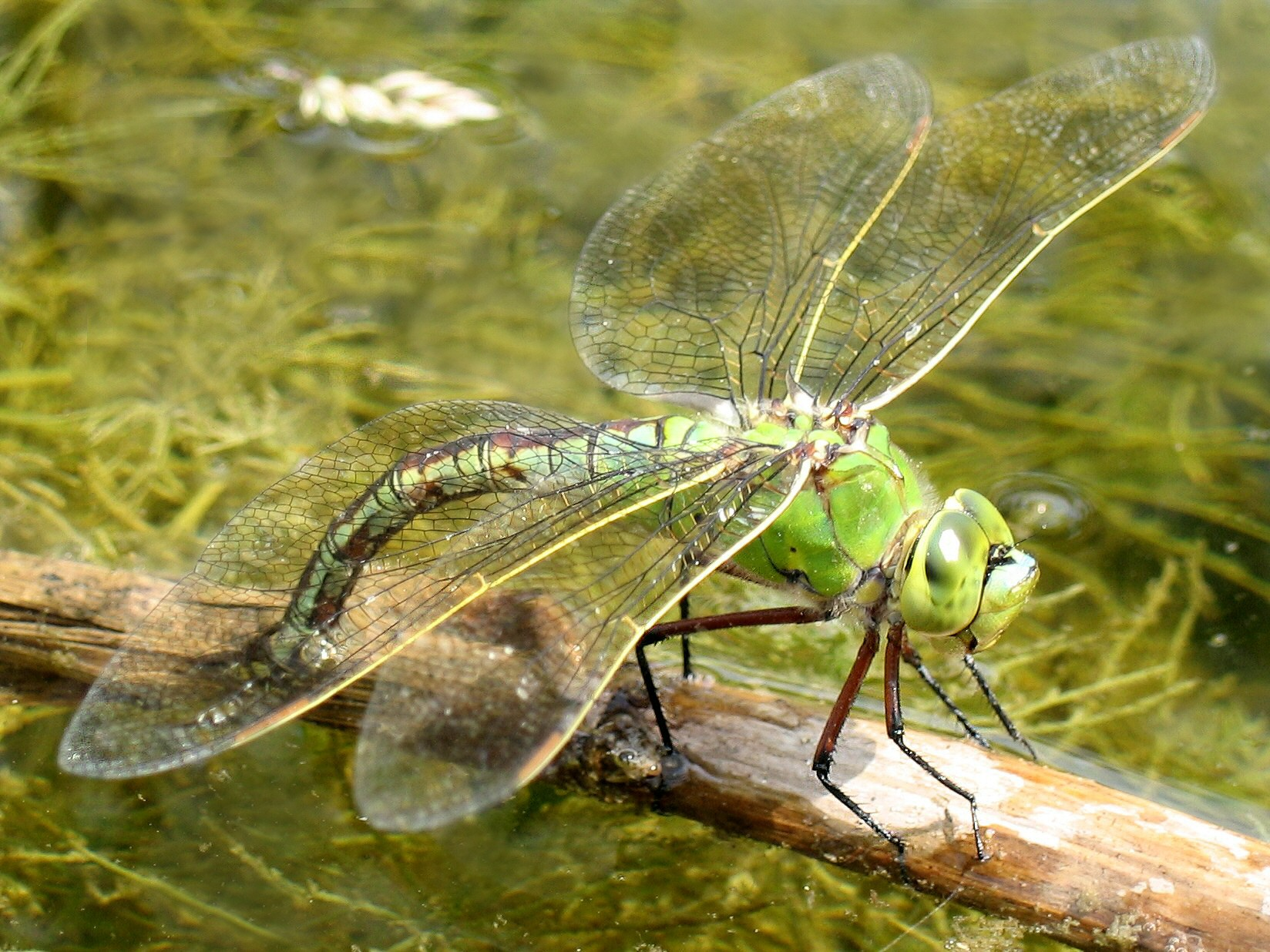
Female laying eggs

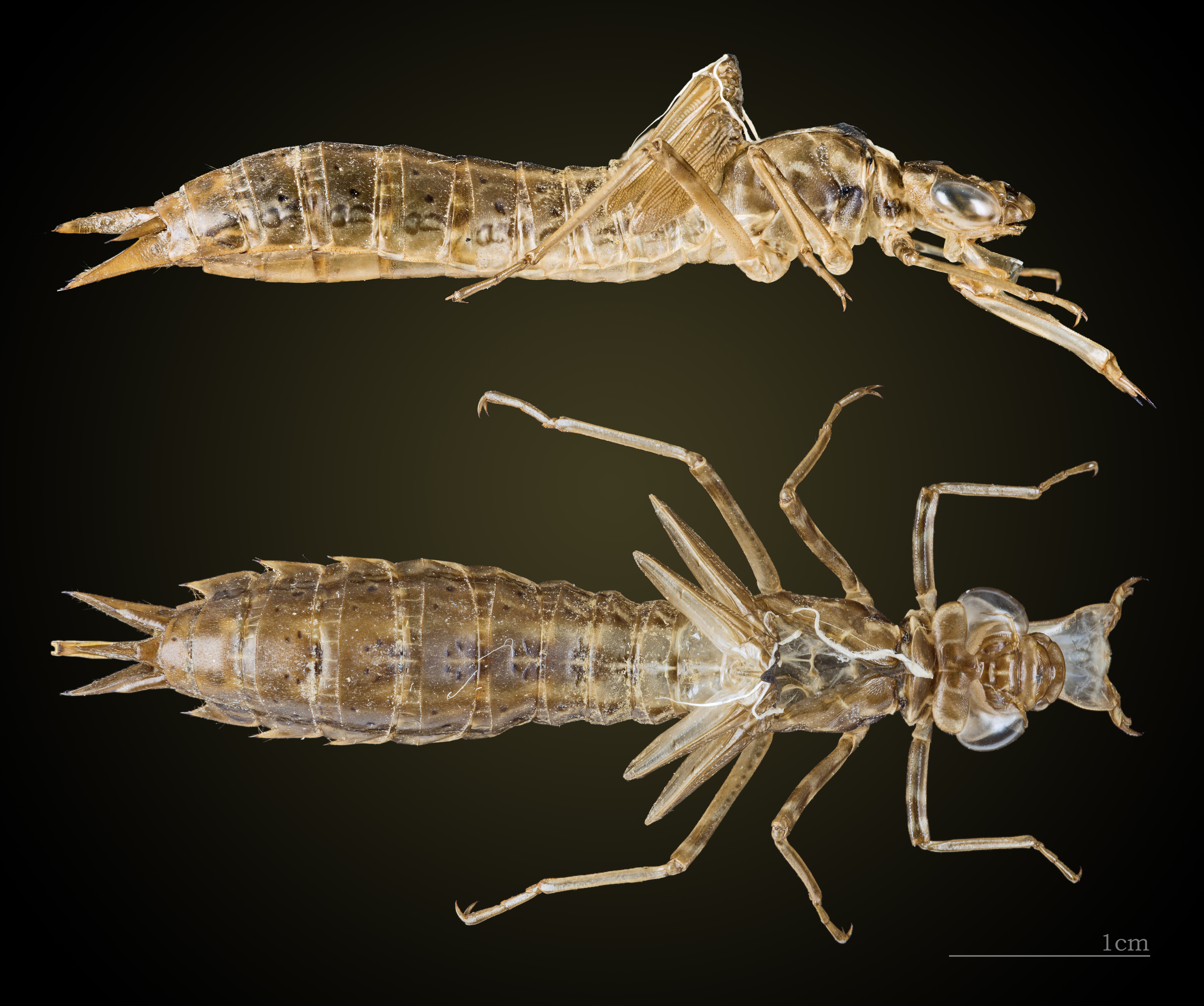
Exuviae

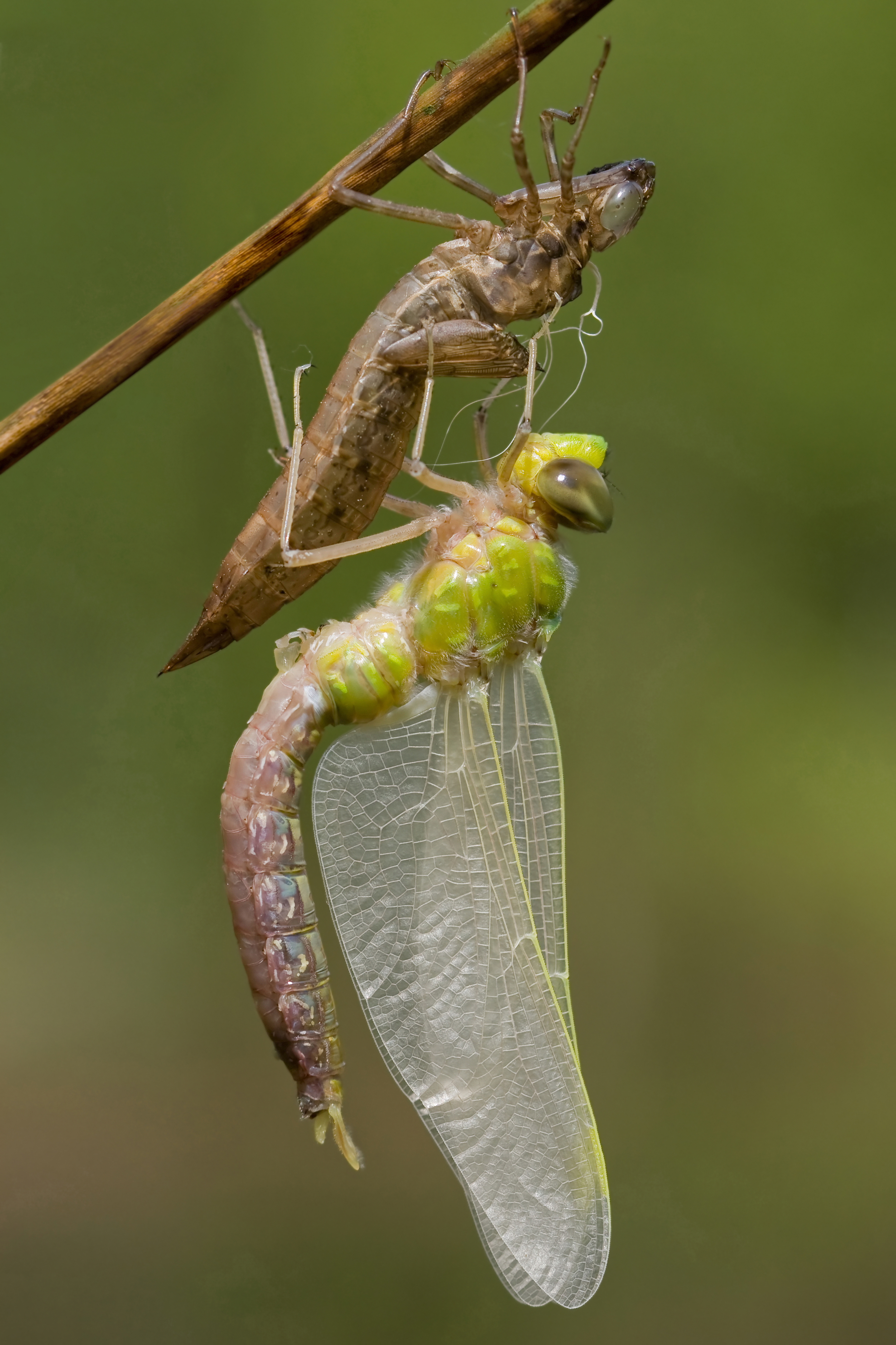
Emerging

== Behaviour ==
They frequently fly high up into the sky in search of prey, which includes butterflies, other odonata and tadpoles. If their hunt is successful, they eat their smaller prey while flying. The dragonflies breed in a variety of aquatic habitats from large ponds to dikes and slow-moving rivers, but require a plentiful supply of vegetation in the water. They do sometimes breed in brackish water. The females lay the eggs into plants such as pondweed, and always lay alone. The aquatic larvae are very aggressive and are likely to influence the native species composition of freshwater ecosystems they arrive in. The larvae are also very large–around 46 millimetres (1.8 in). The adult male is highly territorial, and difficult to approach.

== Conservation ==
Emperor dragonflies are assessed as a least-concern species by the IUCN. The species is widespread and has a stable population.

== Mitochondrial genome ==
The mitogenome of the emperor dragonfly is the longest of all known dragonfly sequences. It has 16,087 base pairs. For comparison, the human mitogenome has 16,569 bp and the closely related dragonfly Anax parthenope has 15,366.
