= Lower Earley =

Suburb in Berkshire, England

Coordinates: 51.424°N 0.934°W

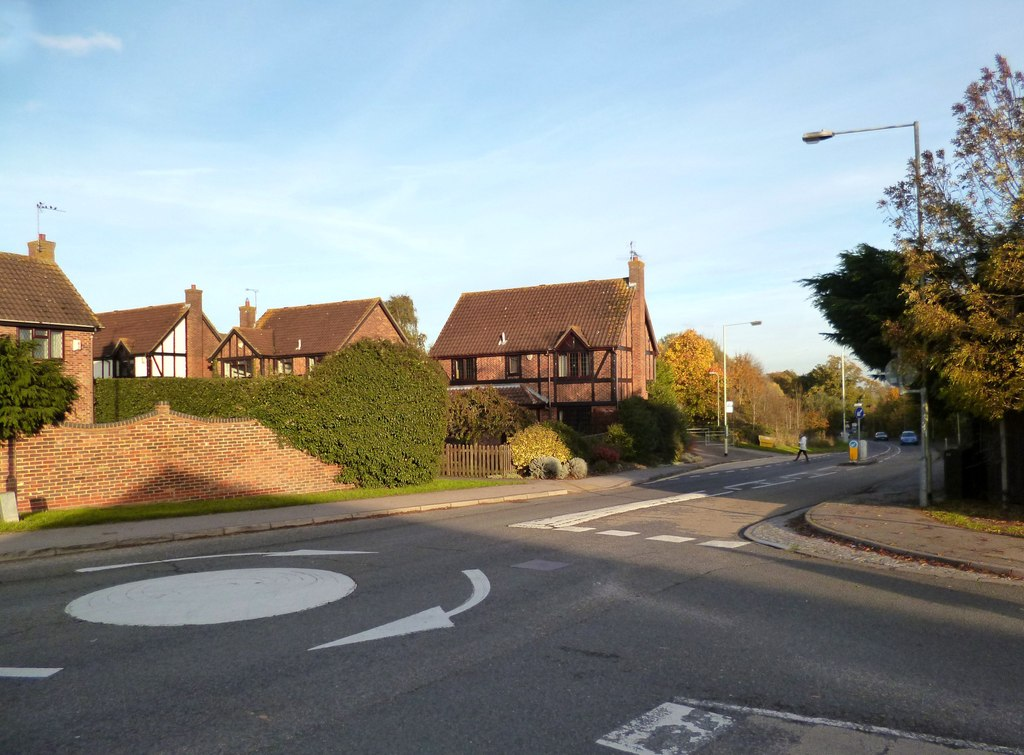
- Rushey Way, Lower Earley

- Location within Berkshire
- Population: 32,036 (2001)
- OS grid reference: SU742699
- Civil parish: Earley
- Unitary authority: Wokingham
- Ceremonial county: Berkshire
- Region: South East
- Country: England
- Sovereign state: United Kingdom
- Post town: READING
- Postcode district: RG6
- Dialling code: 0118
- Police: Thames Valley
- Fire: Royal Berkshire
- Ambulance: South Central
- UK Parliament: Earley and Woodley

Lower Earley is a suburb of Earley, a town in Berkshire, England. Lower Earley is a predominantly lower-density residential area lying on the northern banks of the River Loddon. Growing extensively with new development in the late 20th century, it has a district centre anchored by supermarket

Although within the Borough of Wokingham for administrative purposes, Lower Earley's built-up area is contiguous with the Borough of Reading and had no rural separation from the town, in effect making it an outer suburb of Reading. For this reason, it forms part of the Reading/Wokingham Urban Area.

== History ==
Lower Earley was the part of Earley liberty in Sonning parish beside the River Loddon. It mostly consisted of Earley Upper Common and Lower Wood Common and a number of farms. From 1977, the Lower Earley private estate was constructed. Three new primary schools were built (Hawkedon, Hillside Primary School and Radstock Primary School), together with a large supermarket complex, which opened in 1979, and a sports centre. In 1988, a second shopping area, Maiden Place, opened.

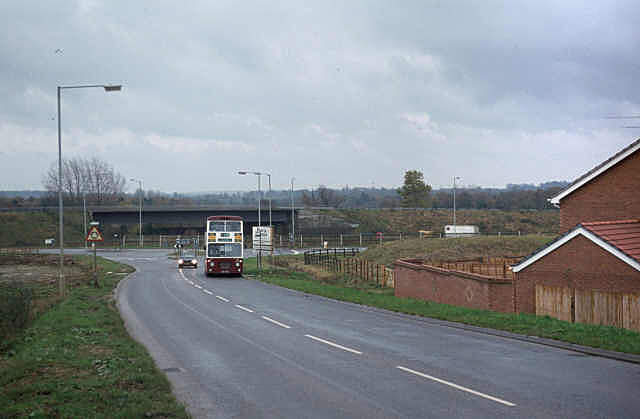
View down Beeston Way in 1982 during the development of Lower Earley

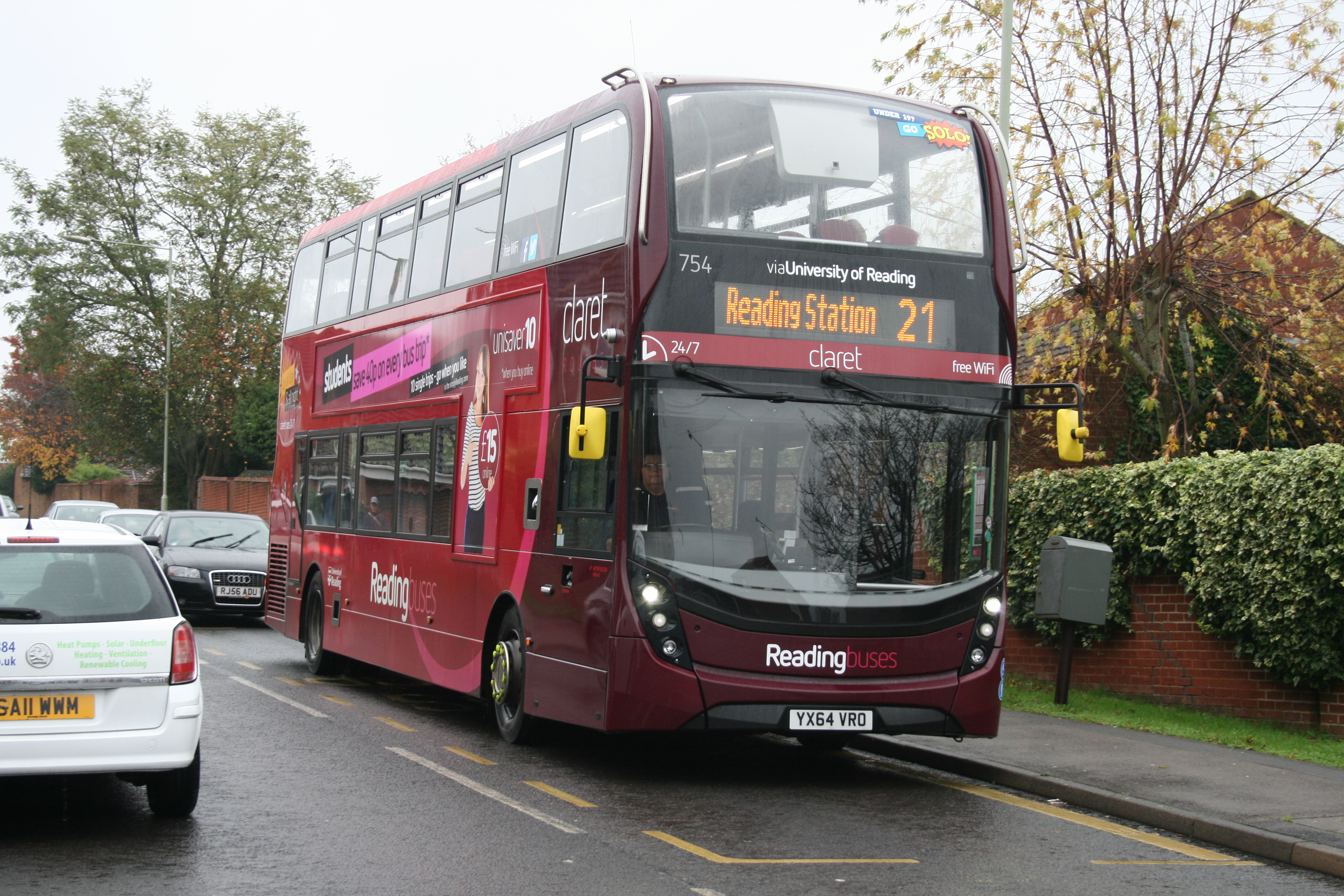
A Claret 21 service running towards Kilnsea Drive

== Facilities ==
=== Schools ===
There are three primary schools in Lower Earley, Hawkedon Primary School, Hillside Primary School and Radstock Primary School. An additional secondary school was planned roughly opposite the sports centre next to Rushey Way, possibly on the site next to the police station. However the school never materialised, and the land was built on. The main secondary schools that students from the area attend are The Bulmershe School, Maiden Erlegh School, The Forest School, The Emmbrook School and The Holt School, as well as some students attending the local single-sex grammar schools, Reading School and Kendrick School. There is also a pre-school next to Chalfont Park.

=== Retail facilities ===
The Maiden Place Shopping Precinct was opened in 1988 on Kilnsea Drive.

=== Local Nature Reserve ===
There is a local nature reserve called Pearman's Copse within the borders of Lower Earley.

== Transport ==
=== Public transport ===
Earley railway station is not close to Lower Earley, as it is nearly 2 miles away. Instead, it serves Earley and the town of Woodley.

Lower Earley has two main bus links to Central Reading, the 21, and 19b, run by Reading Buses. Service 21 runs 24 hours a day, seven days a week, starting from Kilnsea Drive to Reading Station via the University. The 19b runs every 60 minutes (Monday to Saturday) from Asda/Bradmore Way to Reading Station via the Royal Berkshire Hospital. There is also the 919 route which goes from Lower Earley to Reading School.

=== Strategic road network ===
The M4 motorway runs directly to the south of Lower Earley, with Junction 11 being the nearest junction. This major road serves places between London and Swansea, including Swindon, Bristol and Cardiff.

The Lower Earley Way connects the suburb to the A327 (for Reading, or Shinfield and Arborfield) and the A329 (for Reading, or Winnersh and Wokingham) roads, as well as to the A329(M) motorway (for Bracknell).
