= Winnersh Meadows =

Coordinates: 51.43784°N 0.87723°W

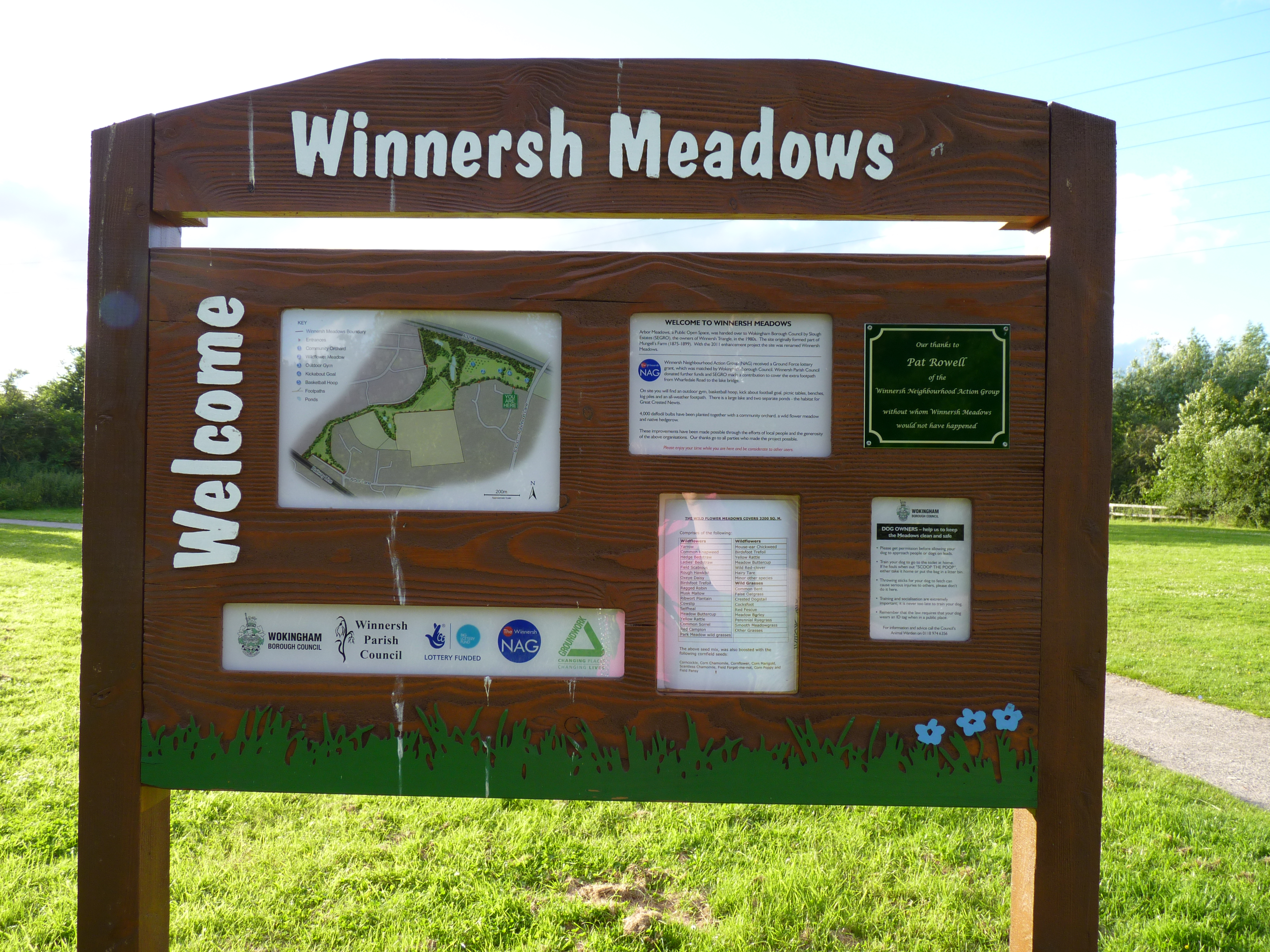
Winnersh Meadows notice board

Winnersh Meadows is a 10 hectares (25 acres) public open space located along the northern boundary of Winnersh, Berkshire, just south of the A329(M).

== History ==
Arbor Meadows land was handed over to Wokingham Borough Council in the 1980s by Slough Estates(SEGRO), who are the owners of Winnersh Triangle. The site originally formed part of Mungell's Farm (1875–1899). After enhancements in 2011 the site was renamed Winnersh Meadows.

The park was rejuvenated in 2011 by members of the local Neighborhood Action group with the help of a National Lottery Grant and funding from the local borough and parish councils; and was renamed Winnersh Meadows.

== Features ==
The park contains a basketball hoop, an adult gym, a wildflower meadow, an orchard of native fruit trees and a selection of ponds. It also contains a vital habitat for Great Crested Newts.

== Gallery ==
Pictures of Winnersh Meadows
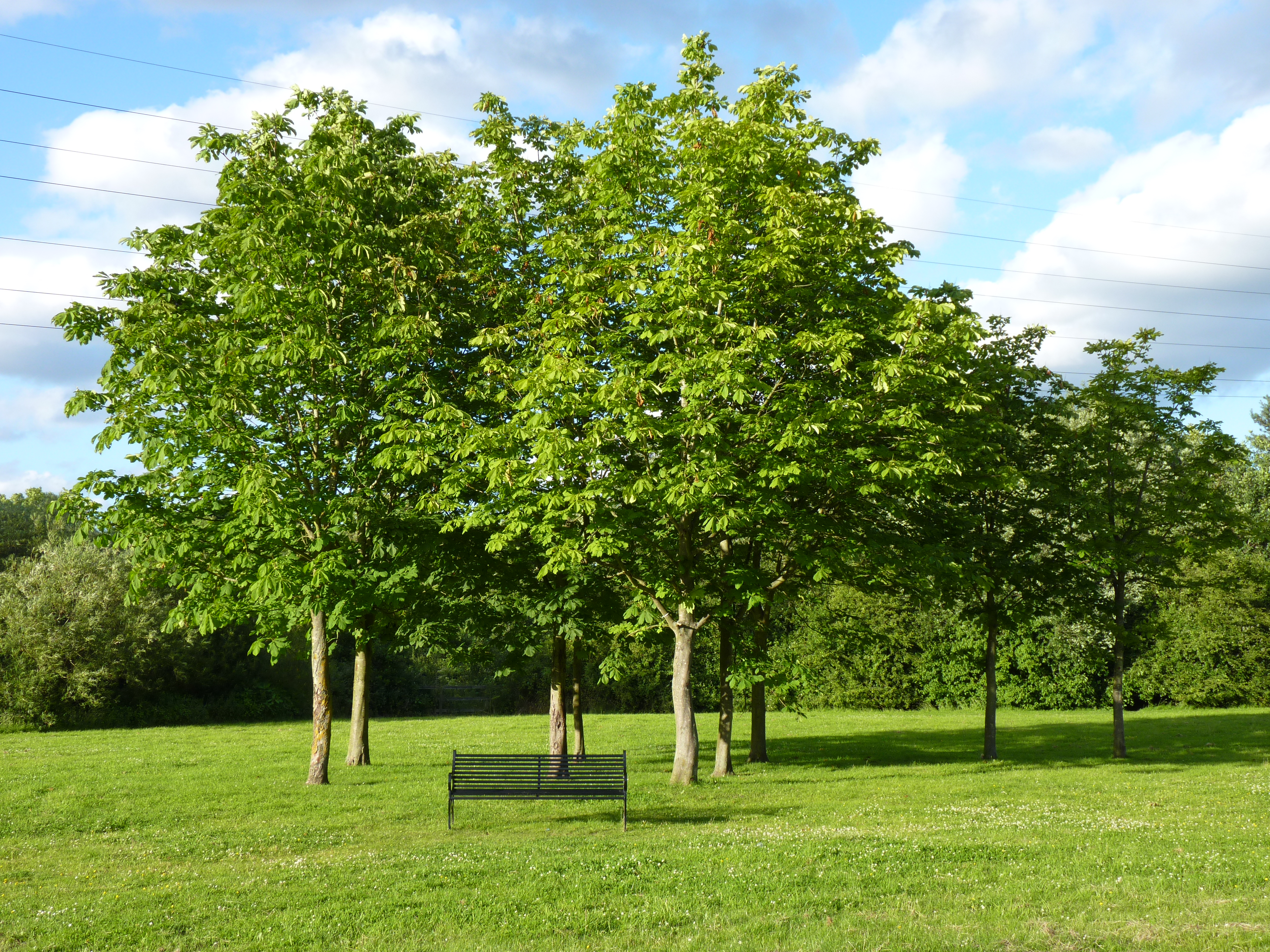
Trees at Winnersh Meadows

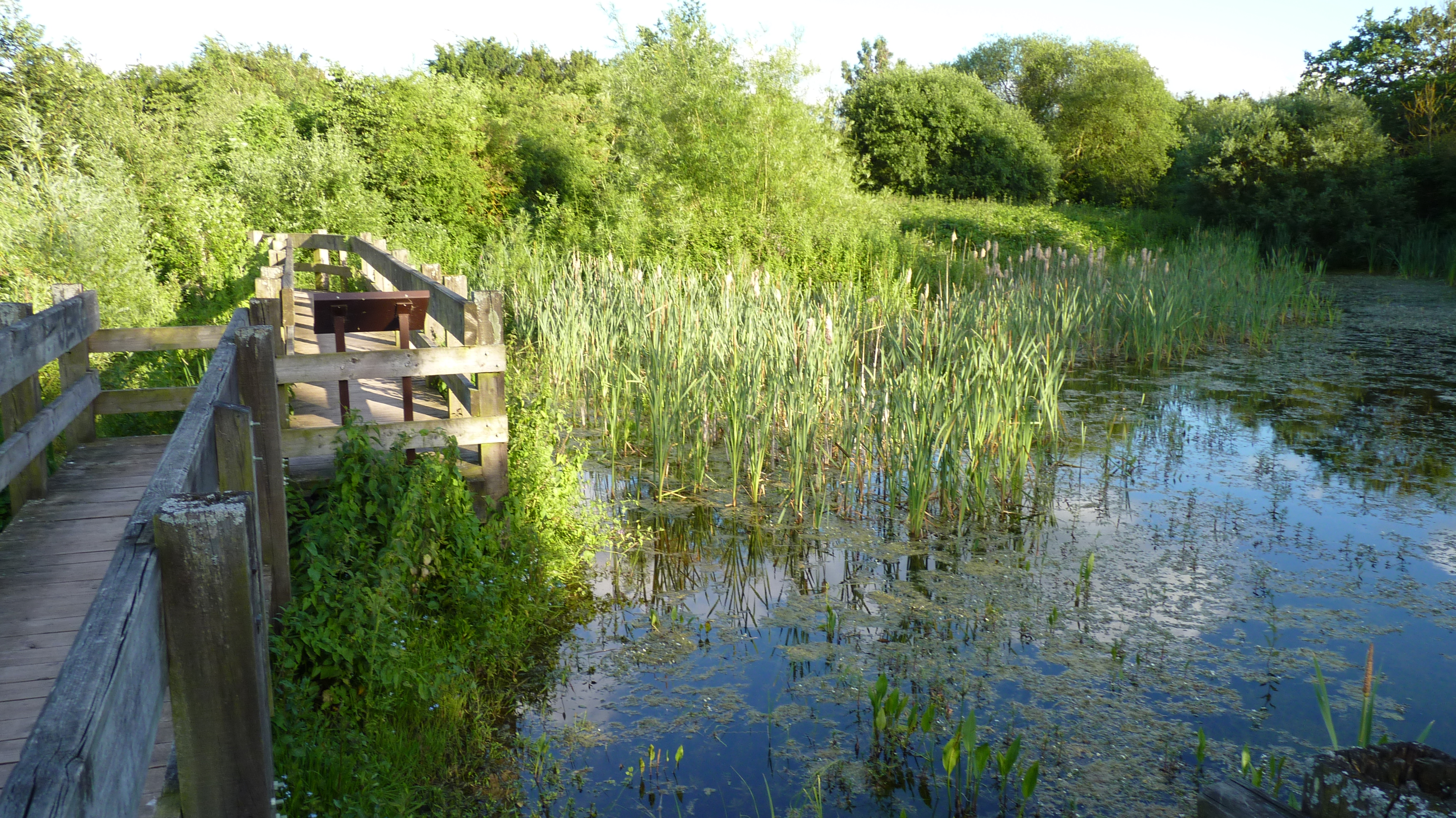
Bridge over pond at Winnersh Meadows

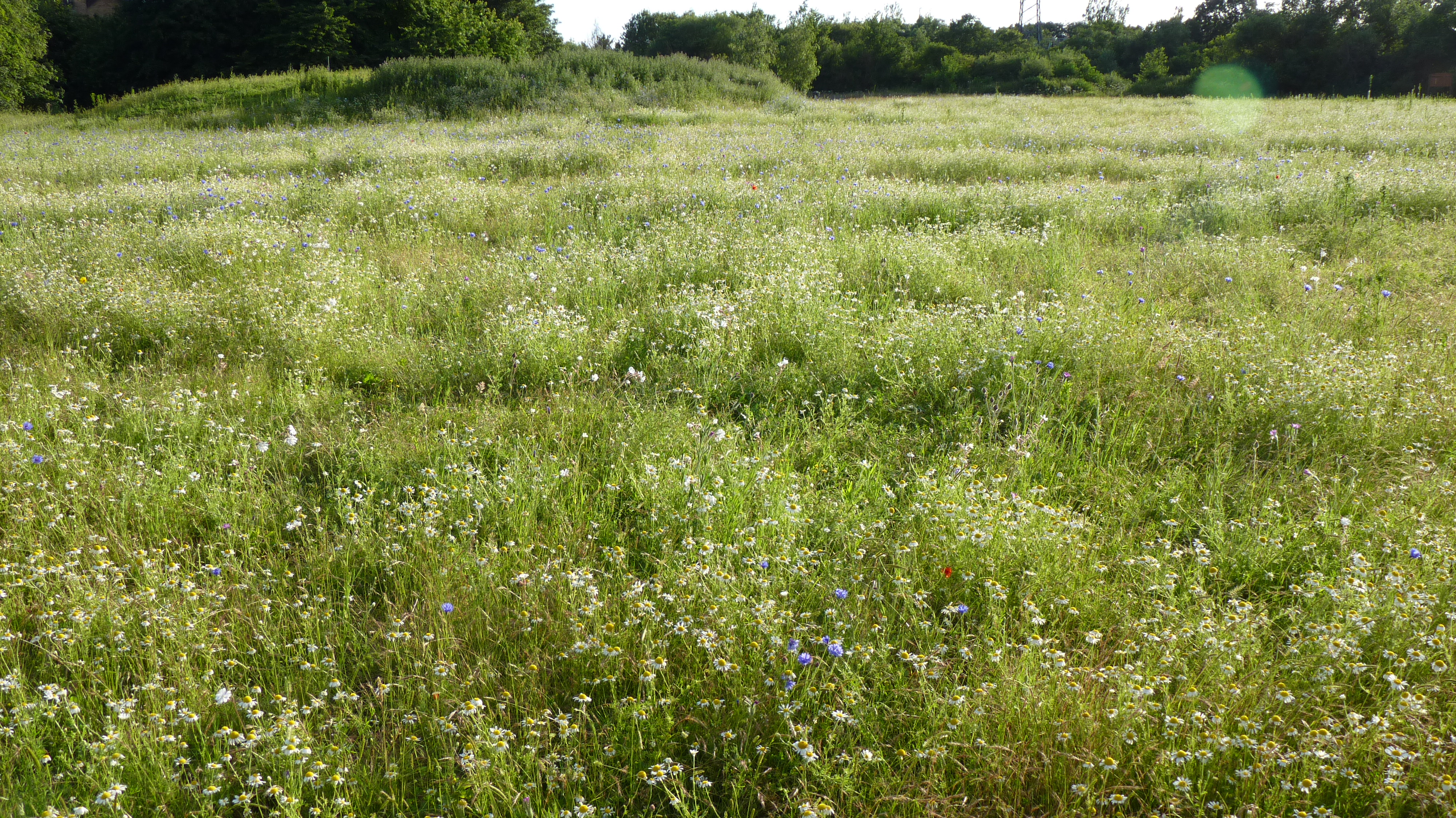
Wildflower Meadow at Winnersh Meadows
