= A329 =

A329 may refer to:

- A329 road in Great Britain
- A329(M) motorway in Great Britain
