= Winnersh railway station =

Railway station in Earley, Berkshire, England

Coordinates: 51.430°N 0.877°W

Winnersh
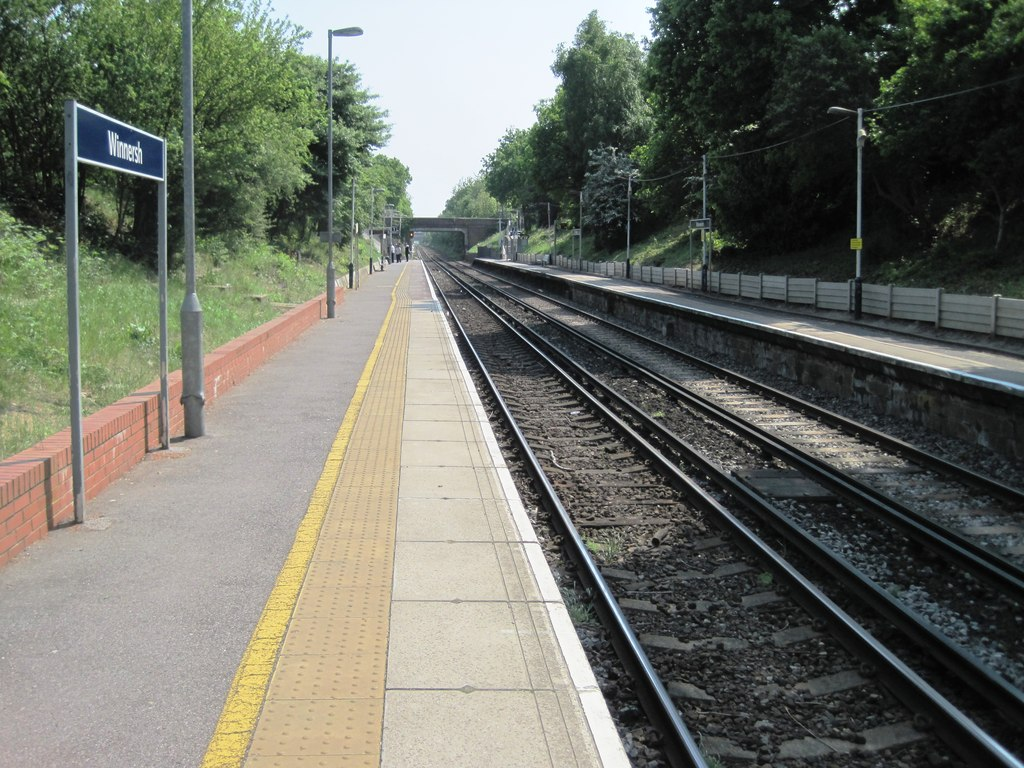

General information
- Location: Winnersh, Wokingham; England
- Grid reference: SU781707
- Manager: South Western Railway
- Platforms: 2

Other information
- Station code: WNS
- Classification: DfT category D

History
- Original company: South Eastern Railway
- Pre-grouping: South Eastern and Chatham Railway
- Post-grouping: Southern Railway

Key dates
- 1 January 1910: Opened as Sindlesham and Hurst Halt
- 6 July 1930: Renamed Winnersh Halt
- 5 May 1969: Renamed Winnersh

Passengers
- 2020/21: ▼0.109 million
- 2021/22: ▲0.262 million
- 2022/23: ▲0.310 million
- 2023/24: ▲0.341 million
- 2024/25: ▲0.384 million
Location
- Location within Reading, Berkshire
Notes
- Passenger statistics from the Office of Rail and Road

Winnersh railway station, previously known as Sindlesham and Hurst Halt and then Winnersh Halt, is a railway station located in the centre of the village of Winnersh in Berkshire, England. It is served by South Western Railway services between London Waterloo and Reading. The station is 38 miles 53 chains (62.2 km) from London Waterloo and 7.7 kilometres (4.8 mi) from Reading, at the point where the B3030 road crosses the line on an overbridge.

Winnersh railway station should not be confused with the much newer Winnersh Triangle railway station, which is situated on the same line some 1.25 kilometres (0.78 mi) in the Reading direction.

== History ==
The South Eastern and Chatham Railway opened the station on 1 January 1910 as Sindlesham and Hurst Halt. At the time the station was located in open countryside, and (as the name suggests) was intended to serve the nearby villages of Sindlesham (1.5 kilometres or 0.93 miles to the south) and Hurst (3 kilometres or 1.9 miles to the north). Following the opening of the station, the village of Winnersh developed around it and on 6 July 1930 the Southern Railway, which had taken over the line in the 1923 Grouping, renamed the station to Winnersh Halt. Finally British Railways shortened this to Winnersh on 5 May 1969.

In 1987 British Railways replaced the wooden station buildings on the platforms with new ones repositioned at the level of the road bridge that carries the B3030 over the line. In 2002 Railtrack extended the London-bound platform to accommodate eight-car Reading-Waterloo trains, just before South West Trains introduced Class 458 trains to the route. Until then, when the slam-door stock that they replaced was still in service, passengers wishing to leave the train at Winnersh were advised to move down the train in order to alight.

== Facilities ==
The station has two side platforms, each of which has a separate ramped access down from the road overbridge carrying the B3030 over the line. The station building is situated at street level, alongside the entrance to the Reading bound platform. Access between the station building and London-bound platform, and between platforms, is via a 30 metres (98 ft) walk on the street.

The station building includes a ticket office, but it is currently staffed only on Monday to Saturday mornings. On Sundays the station is open but the booking office is closed. There is also a self-service ticket machine outside the station building. Access to the platforms is via ramps, which may be too steep for wheelchair usage.

== Services ==
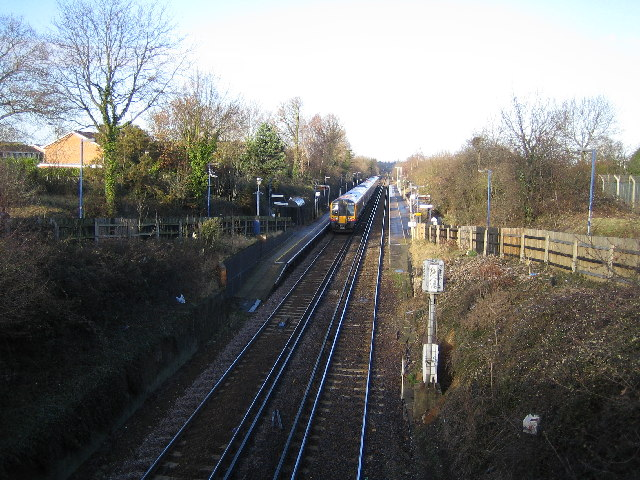
Winnersh railway station

Most services at Winnersh are operated by South Western Railway, with a very limited service operated by Great Western Railway.

The typical off-peak service in trains per hour is:

- 2 tph to London Waterloo via Richmond
- 2 tph to Reading

A single Great Western Railway operated return service between Reading and Gatwick Airport calls at the station each day.

| Preceding station | National Rail | Following station |
|---|---|---|
| Wokingham | South Western Railway Waterloo to Reading Line | Winnersh Triangle |
| Wokingham | Great Western Railway North Downs Line Limited Service | Reading |

== Bibliography ==
- Butt, R.V.J. (1995). The Directory of Railway Stations. Yeovil: Patrick Stephens Ltd. ISBN 1-85260-508-1. R508.
