= M31 =

M31 may refer to:

== Roadways ==
- M31 motorway, a planned but unbuilt motorway in England
- M-31 (Michigan highway), a former state highway in Michigan
- Hume Highway in Australia, designated "M31"
- M31 motorway (Hungary), a short motorway section near Budapest, Hungary
- M31 (Cape Town), a Metropolitan Route in Cape Town, South Africa
- M31 (Johannesburg), a Metropolitan Route in Johannesburg, South Africa
- M31 (Pretoria), a Metropolitan Route in Pretoria, South Africa
- M31 (Durban), a Metropolitan Route in Durban, South Africa

== Military ==
- Suomi M-31 SMG, a Finnish WWII-era submachine gun
- M31 HEAT rifle grenade
- M31 Recovery Vehicle based on the M3 Lee tank
- M31 rocket, an alternate designation for the MGR-1 Honest John, a United States military rocket
- M31 (missile), for a multiple-launch rocket system (MLRS)
- M31 is the pennant number for HMS Cattistock, a Hunt-class mine countermeasures vessel

== Other ==
- M_{31} = 0x7FFFFFFF = 2147483647, the eighth Mersenne prime number
- M31 (New York City bus), a New York City Bus route in Manhattan
- M31: A Family Romance, a novel by writer Stephen Wright
- Messier 31 (M31), a spiral galaxy also called the Andromeda Galaxy
- Samsung Galaxy M31, an Android-based smartphone
- Remington Model 31, a pump-action shotgun made by Remington Arms
