= Ruscombe =

Village in Berkshire, England

Coordinates: 51.480°N 0.852°W

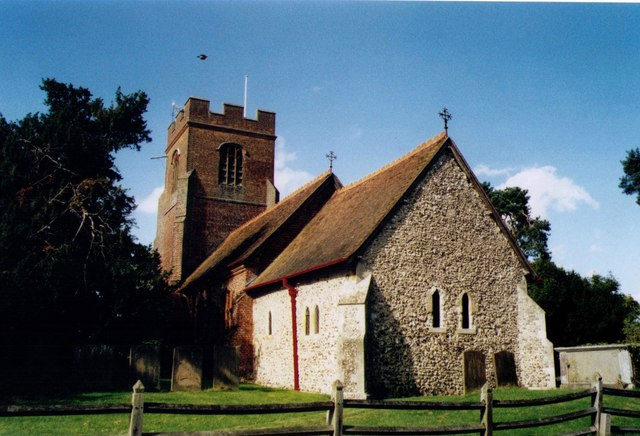
- St James' parish church

- Location within Berkshire
- Population: 1,094 (2011 Census)
- OS grid reference: SU7976
- Civil parish: Ruscombe
- Unitary authority: Wokingham
- Ceremonial county: Berkshire
- Region: South East
- Country: England
- Sovereign state: United Kingdom
- Post town: Reading
- Postcode district: RG10
- Dialling code: 0118
- Police: Thames Valley
- Fire: Royal Berkshire
- Ambulance: South Central
- UK Parliament: Wokingham
- Website: Ruscombe Parish Council

Ruscombe is a village and civil parish, east of Twyford in the Borough of Wokingham in Berkshire, England.

== History ==
Reports from the late 1800s provided summaries of the status of the village; in 1876, the population was 200 and that increased to 349 by 1895. The village was served by a National school. The primary landowners were TC Garth and Rev. A Barker. St James the Great church was described as "a building of flint and brick, consisting of chancel, nave, south porch, and an embattled western tower". A history of the parish published in 1923 provided extensive coverage of the previous centuries. At that time, the settlement included "a few modern cottages" as well as the manor and church.

== Parish church ==
The Church of England parish church of St James was built in the late 12th century. Its Norman chancel survives but its nave and west tower were rebuilt in 1638–39. Additional modifications were made in the 1800s. The church has been a Grade I listed building since 1967. St James' is part of a united benefice with St. Mary's, Twyford. The benefice is in turn part of a local ecumenical partnership with Twyford United Reformed Church. In March 2020, the partnerships included St Mary's Twyford, St Nicholas Hurst, St James Ruscombe and Twyford United Reformed Church.

== Manor ==
The manor of Southbury was the home of William Penn from 1710 until his death in 1718. The house was torn down in 1829.

== Notable people ==
- William Penn, the founder of Pennsylvania, lived in Ruscombe from 1710 until his death in 1718.
- Dennis Price, co-star of the film Kind Hearts and Coronets, was born in Ruscombe in 1915.

== Amenities ==
Ruscombe Football Club plays in the Reading Sunday League.

== Bibliography ==
- Ditchfield, P.H.; Page, W.H., eds. (1923). "Parishes: Ruscombe". A History of the County of Berkshire, Volume 3. Victoria County History.
- Ford, David Nash (2001). William Penn (1644-1718). Archived from the original on 8 March 2019.
- Pevsner, Nikolaus (1966). Berkshire. The Buildings of England. Harmondsworth: Penguin Books. pp. 208–209.
