= Winnersh Triangle railway station =

Railway station in Winnersh, Berkshire, England

Winnersh Triangle
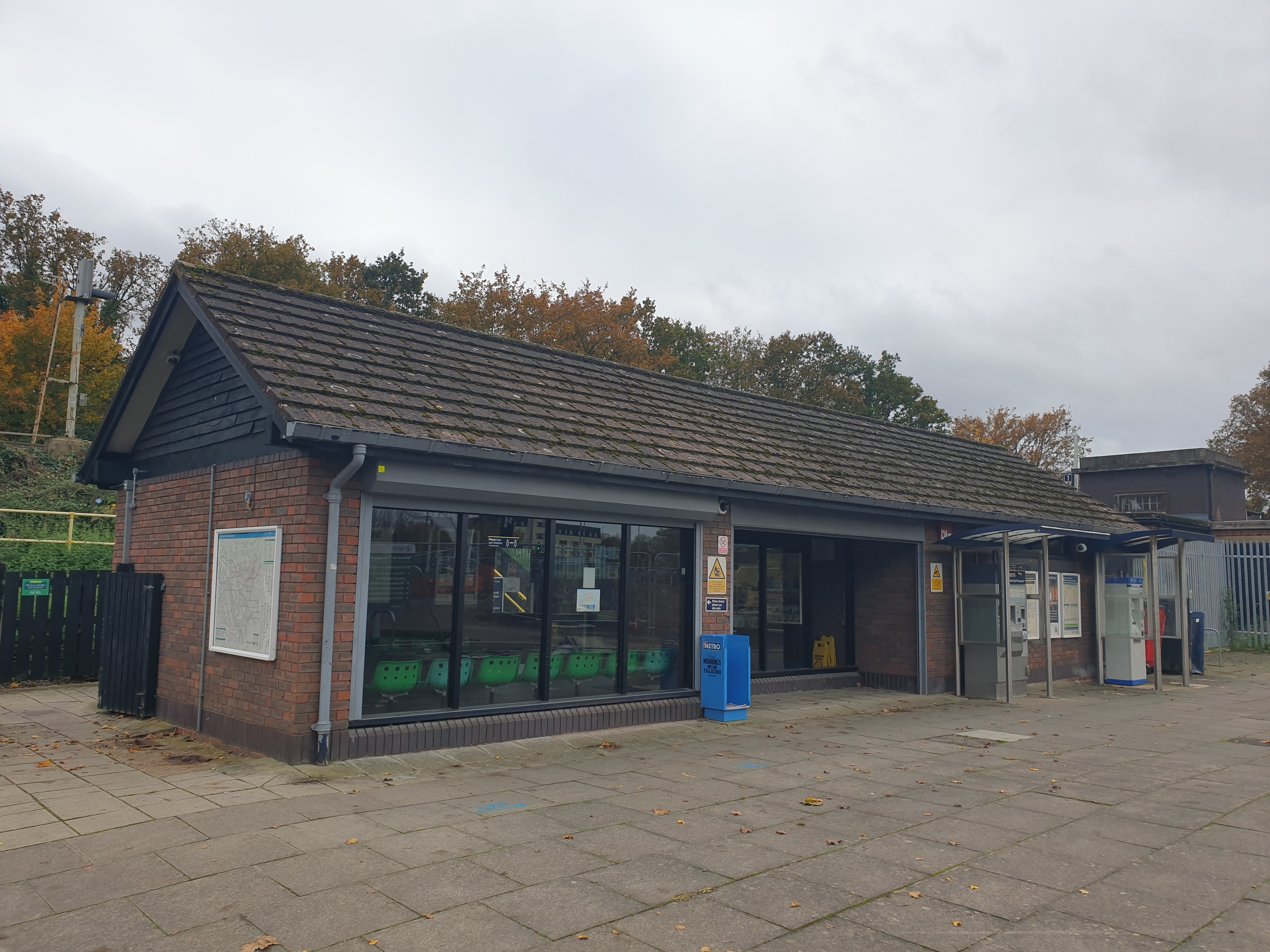
- The station building

General information
- Location: Winnersh, Wokingham; England
- Coordinates: 51°26′13″N 0°53′28″W
- Grid reference: SU771714
- Manager: South Western Railway
- Platforms: 2

Other information
- Station code: WTI
- Classification: DfT category E

History
- Original company: British Rail

Key dates
- 12 May 1986: Station opened

Passengers
- 2020/21: ▼42,654
- 2021/22: ▲0.121 million
- 2022/23: ▲0.179 million
- 2023/24: ▲0.199 million
- 2024/25: ▲0.218 million
Location
- Location within Reading, Berkshire
Notes
- Passenger statistics from the Office of Rail and Road

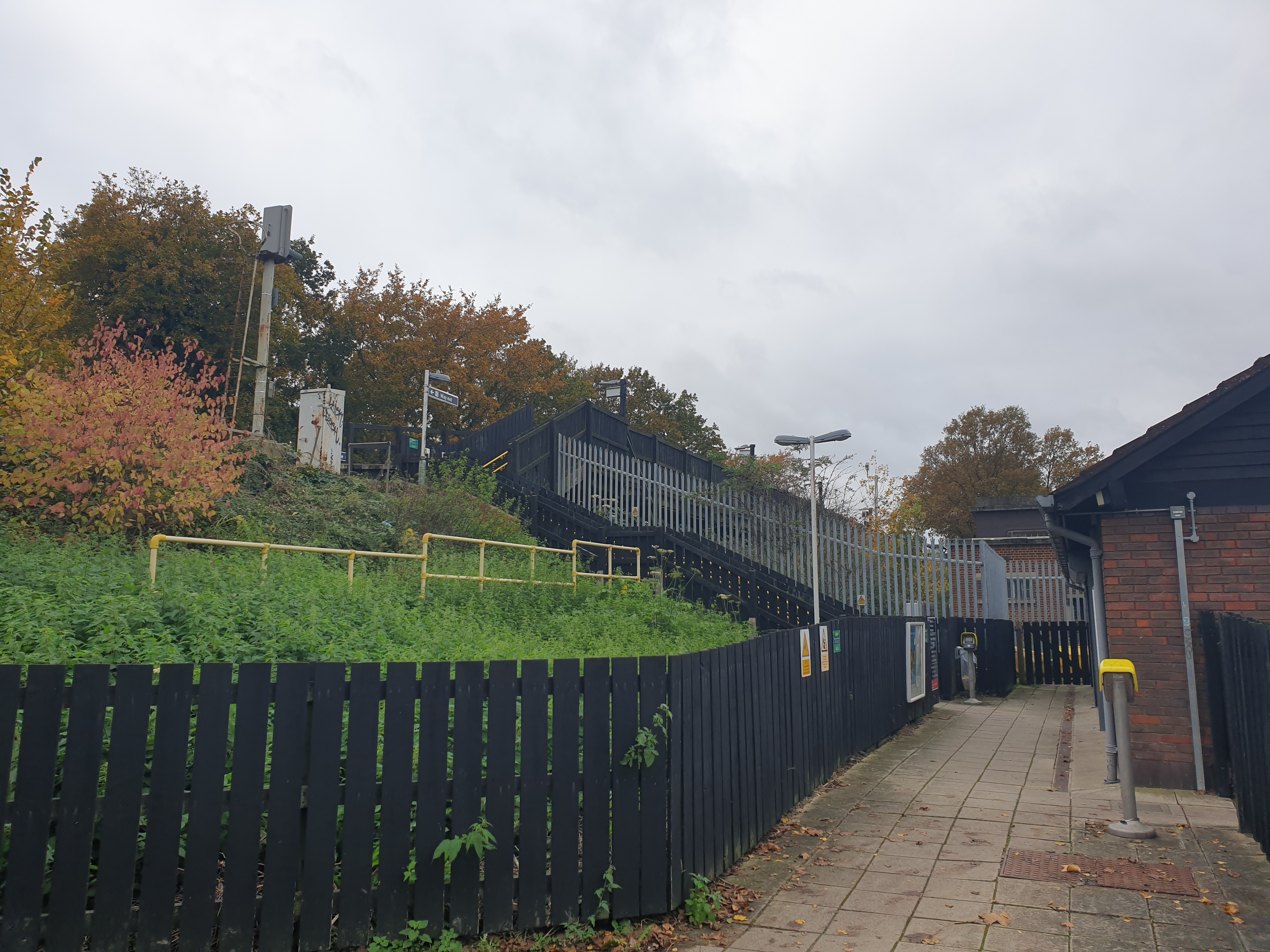
Access from station building to London-bound platform

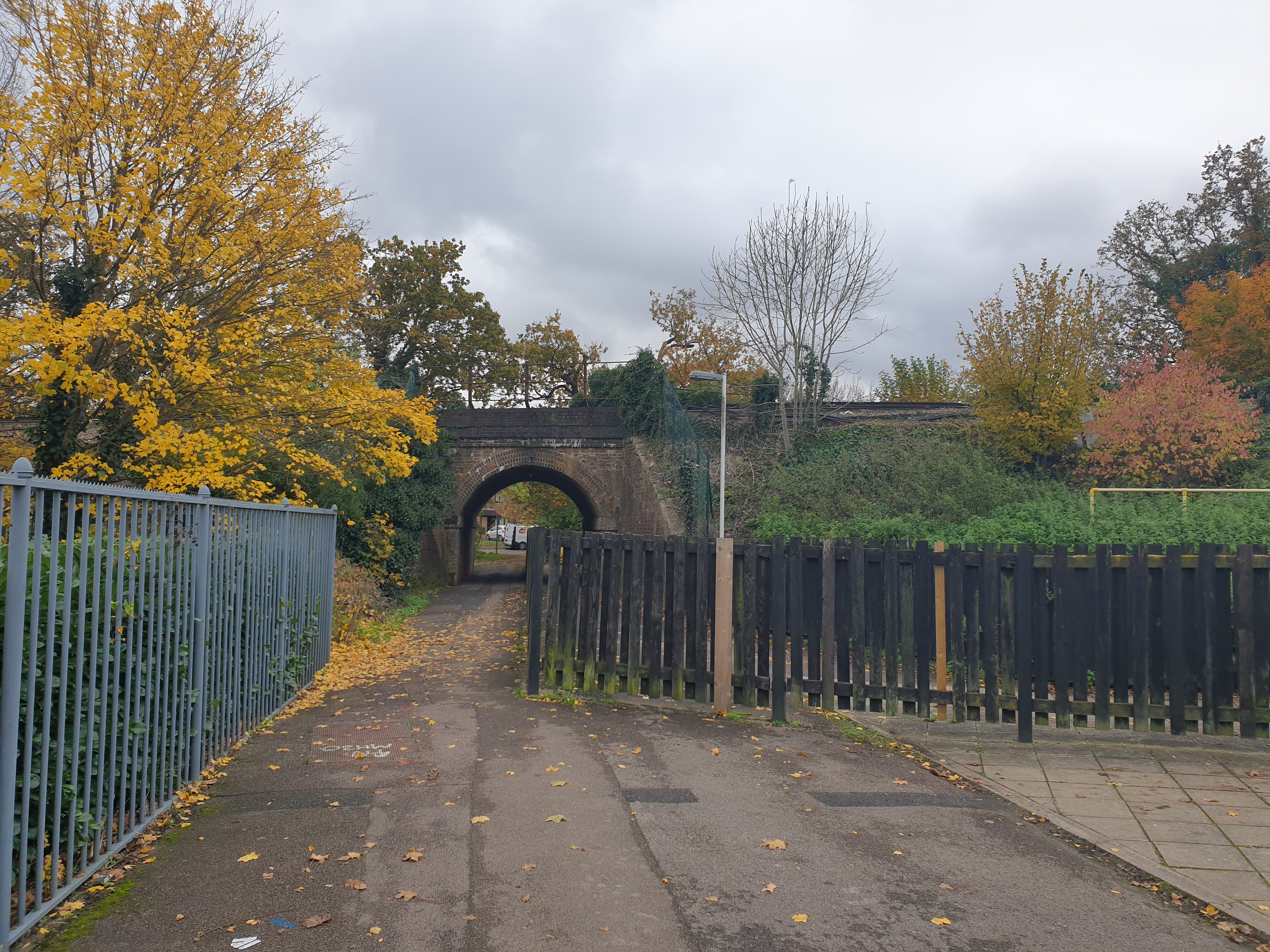
Access under the railway to Wokingham Road (left, outside fence) and Reading-bound platform (inside fence)

Winnersh Triangle railway station is one of two railway stations in Winnersh, Berkshire, England. It is served by South Western Railway services between London Waterloo and Reading. The station is on the west side of Winnersh, 39 miles 35 chains (63.5 km) from London Waterloo and 6.4 kilometres (4.0 mi) from Reading. It is situated on an embankment by which the railway crosses the valley of the River Loddon, and is some 500 metres (1,600 ft) east of the bridge across that river.

Winnersh Triangle railway station should not be confused with the much older Winnersh railway station, which is situated on the same line some 1.25 kilometres (0.78 mi) in the London direction.

== History ==
British Rail opened the station on 12 May 1986 to serve housing developments at Lower Earley, Woodley and Winnersh, as well as the Winnersh Triangle business park which had been developed to the north. Constructed at a cost of £375,000, the housing developers contributed 20% while the remainder was met by Berkshire County Council and British Rail. The station's opening coincided with the introduction of the Southern Region's summer timetable which saw an initial basic half-hourly service to both Waterloo and Reading, with some extra services running to Reading and Guildford.

Over the years, the business park has evolved from a mixed office and warehousing form to a more dense office park, including several hotels. At the beginning of the 2010s, a new landscaped bridge was constructed between the front of the station and the business park, avoiding the need for travellers to cross the busy intermediate road. In 2015, a new park and ride site was opened outside the front of the station, the result of the relocation of a site at nearby Loddon Bridge that was found to be prone to flooding.

== Facilities ==
The station has two side platforms, which are long enough for an eight-car train. These are built of timber, the lightweight construction being to reduce the load on the railway embankment across the Loddon Valley. The station building is brick-built and situated at ground level, to the north of the embankment and platforms, with direct pedestrian access to the Winnersh Triangle business park via the landscaped bridge. A secondary entrance to the station is available on the south side, connecting to a footpath to the Wokingham Road and nearby residential roads; both this and the access to the southern platform make use of a pre-existing arch under the railway.

The station building includes a ticket office, but it is currently staffed only on Monday to Saturday mornings. On Sundays the station is open but the booking office is closed. There is also a self-service ticket machine outside the station building. There is no disabled access to the platforms, and all access between the station entrances and the platforms is by stairs.

The station is situated near to a junction of the A329(M) motorway, providing convenient access from places along that motorway and the M4 motorway, which the A329M intersects 2.5 kilometres (1.6 mi) to the east. Outside the main entrance to the station is the park and ride site, which is served by express buses running every 15 minutes into central Reading, in addition to the trains at the station. The car park has capacity for 390 cars, and has a current usage of 70% bus and 20% rail park and ride users. 200 metres (660 ft) walk to the south of the station, on Wokingham Road, are stops on the local bus route that links Reading, Wokingham and Bracknell.

== Services ==
All services at Winnersh Triangle are operated by South Western Railway.

The typical off-peak service in trains per hour is:

- 2 tph to London Waterloo via Richmond
- 2 tph to Reading

Additional services call at the station during the peak hours.

Preceding station	National Rail	Following station
Winnersh	South Western Railway Waterloo to Reading Line	Earley

== Future ==
A new development for the station environment, known as Winnersh Triangle Parkway, has been proposed by Wokingham Borough Council. This will involve the addition of a parking deck over the existing Park and Ride car park that will add an extra 130 parking spaces, a revamp of the ticket office and waiting areas inside the station building, and improvements to pedestrian access in the station forecourt area. Work commenced on the development in April 2021, with completion expected by Spring 2022.

== Bibliography ==
- Butt, R.V.J. (1995). The Directory of Railway Stations. Yeovil: Patrick Stephens Ltd. ISBN 1-85260-508-1. R508.
- Mitchell, Victor E.; Smith, Keith (September 2008) [1988]. Country Railway Routes: Reading to Guildford. Midhurst: Middleton Press. ISBN 978-0-906520-47-5.
- Yonge, John (November 2008) [1994]. Jacobs, Gerald (ed.). Railway Track Diagrams 5: Southern & TfL (3rd ed.). Bradford on Avon: Trackmaps. ISBN 978-0-9549866-4-3.
