= Winnersh =

Village and civil parish in England

Coordinates: 51.4281°N 0.8794°W

- Village and Civil parish
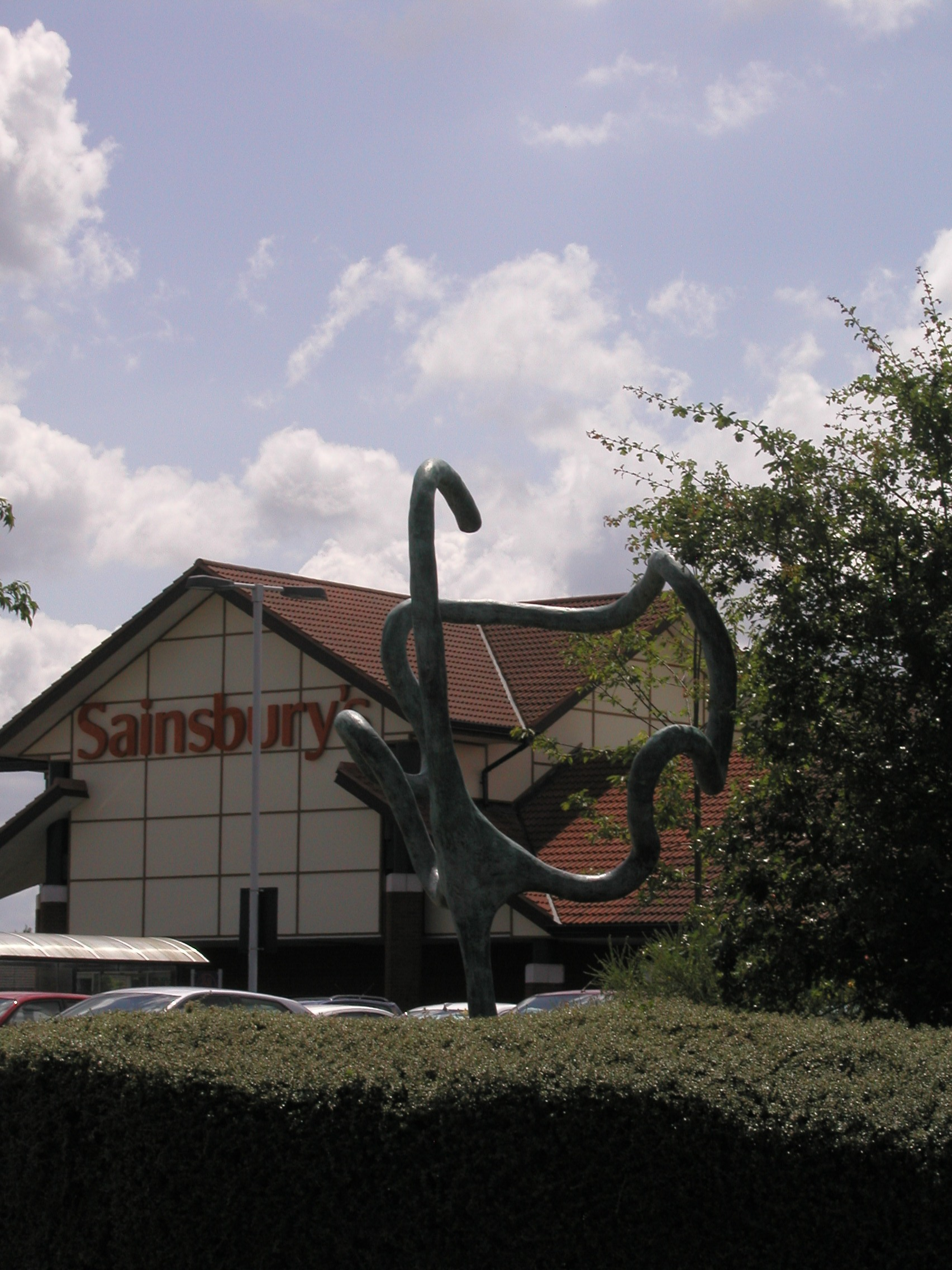
- Loddon Lily statue by Sainsbury's near Winnersh Crossroads

- Location within Berkshire
- Interactive map of Winnersh
- Population: 9,407 (2011 Census)
- OS grid reference: SU780704
- Civil parish: Winnersh
- Unitary authority: Wokingham
- Ceremonial county: Berkshire
- Region: South East
- Country: England
- Sovereign state: United Kingdom
- Post town: WOKINGHAM
- Postcode district: RG41
- Dialling code: 0118
- Police: Thames Valley
- Fire: Royal Berkshire
- Ambulance: South Central
- UK Parliament: Wokingham

Winnersh (/ˈwɪnərʃ/) is a suburban village and civil parish in the borough of Wokingham in Berkshire, England. The village is located around 2 miles (3.2 km) northwest of Wokingham town centre and around 4 miles (6.4 km) southeast of central Reading. It is roughly bounded by the M4 motorway to the south, the A329(M) motorway to the north, and the River Loddon to the west. The parish extends beyond the M4 to cover the estate village of Sindlesham.

== Toponymy ==
The name "Winnersh" comes from the Old English words winn meaning water meadow or pasture and ersc (or earsh) meaning stubble field or park. This implies that Winnersh consisted of cultivated areas of land centuries ago. It has been mentioned in documents since the late 12th century as a description of the area. Winnersh was originally one of the four "Liberties" of the parish of Hurst.

== History ==
Winnersh was largely developed during the railway age. The South Eastern Railway built the North Downs Line in 1849, but the station now known as Winnersh was not opened until 1910, and was originally named "Sindlesham and Hurst Halt". The station was renamed Winnersh Halt in 1930.

Housing and light industry followed the railway, and now Winnersh has two stations, Winnersh and Winnersh Triangle, opened on 12 May 1986, the latter named after the industrial estate that it serves. Modern Winnersh exists mostly as a dormitory town and forms part of the seven mile long urban corridor along the A329 between Wokingham and Reading. Much of modern Winnersh includes areas that were formerly parts of the villages of Sindlesham and Merryhill Green. Most of Merryhill Green was destroyed by the construction of the A329(M).

=== Winnersh Crossroads ===
One of the main focal points of Winnersh is the Winnersh Crossroads where the Reading Road crosses King Street Lane and Robin Hood Lane. In 1840 it was a farm, known as King Street Farm by 1899. The area was known as Winnersh Corner in the 1920s and 1930s. In 1935 the farm name was changed to Allnatt Farm, and between 1939 and the early 1950s, Sale Tilney, a company importing and selling tractors from America, occupied the site. Following this was the Crimpy Crisps factory, which was on the site for around 20 years. Between 1975 and the early 1990s the site housed the United Kingdom headquarters of Hewlett-Packard. In 1997, a Sainsbury's supermarket was built on the site. This store was subsequently extended in phases over the adjacent Ruralcrafts Garden Centre.

== Transport ==
Winnersh is situated on the main road between Reading and Wokingham, while Winnersh railway station and Winnersh Triangle railway station are on the Waterloo to Reading line.

There is also a regular bus service that runs through the centre of the village between Reading and Bracknell via Wokingham.

== Amenities ==
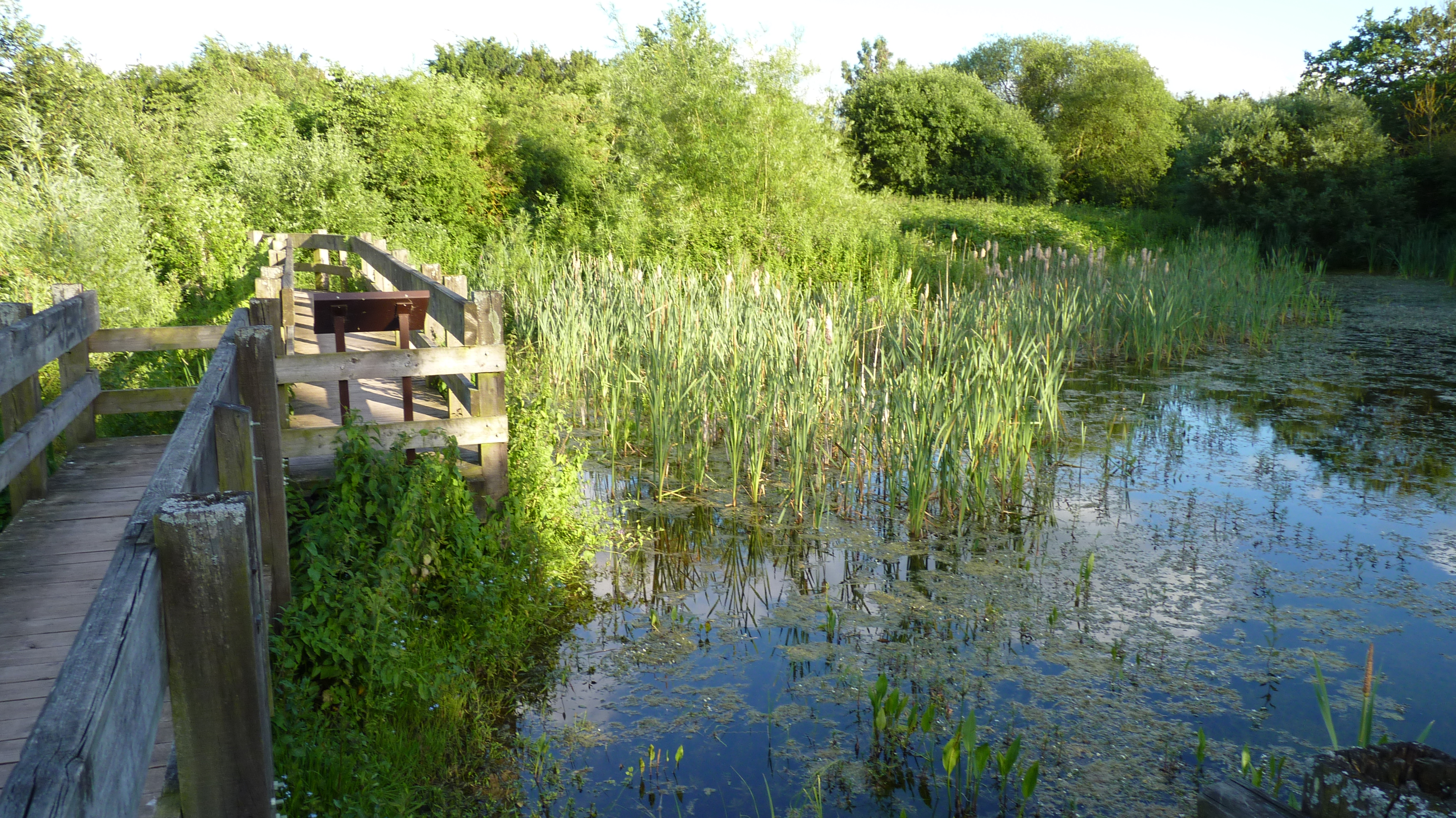
Bridge over a pond at Winnersh Meadows

The Reading Showcase Cinema multiplex is just inside the Western edge of Winnersh. It is built on a flood plain of the River Loddon], but the building is raised to a sufficient level as to be unaffected. Opposite this is the Winnersh Garden Centre, now part of the Wyevale chain.

Winnersh has only one pub, The Pheasant, situated at Winnersh crossroads, it also has a hotel annex which serves a number of businesses on Winnersh Triangle industrial estate.

Winnersh Meadows is a 10-hectare country park on the southern side of the A329(M). It contains an orchard, a wildflower meadow and various wetland habitats for Great Crested Newts.

The Emm Brook and the River Loddon run through Winnersh.

=== Spoonyville ===
In 2020, during the COVID-19 pandemic, a local resident, Karen Vass, created a 'Spoonyville' exhibition of homemade spoons where local residents, especially children, could leave their own creations at the corner of Robin Hood Lane and Robin Hood Way. Starting with two initial spoons called 'Wood-ee' and 'Metal-da' the exhibition grew to include more than 200 spoons.

== Education ==
The area is served by three primary schools: Winnersh Primary School, Wheatfield Primary School and Bearwood Primary School. There is one secondary school, The Forest School, an all-boys' school dating from 1957. in addition there are three nursery/pre-school establishments; The Greenwood Pre-school, Hapitots Day Nursery and Pre-school and Toad Hall Nursery.

== Demographics ==
The 2001 census recorded 7,939 people living in 2,953 households in the parish. Of these homes, 2,444 were Owner Occupied, 290 were Social Rented homes, 195 were Privately Rented and 24 homes were Rent Free. Below are some other facts the census data revealed about Winnersh:

7,431 people live in an unshared house or bungalow, 238 people live in flats or maisonettes, 182 live in caravans or other temporary structures.

The 2001 census also recorded the following ethnic breakdown: White 94.19%, Asian 3.22%, Mixed 1.04%, Black 0.58%, Chinese 0.37% and other 0.58%

The religious breakdown in 2001 was as follows: 5,716 Christian, 32 Buddhist, 77 Hindu, 17 Jewish, 84 Muslim, 99 Sikh, 38 other religion, 1,397 no religion, 479 religion not stated.

There were 5,842 people of employable age (between 16 and 74) in Winnersh, of whom 4,339 were in employment. Of people who were not working 588 people were retired, 371 people were looking after their families, 200 people were full-time students, 120 people were sick or disabled and only 103 people were unemployed.

== Notable people ==
- Daniel Howell (born 1991), YouTuber and presenter, grew up in Winnersh
