= Pearman's Copse =

Nature reserve in Berkshire, England

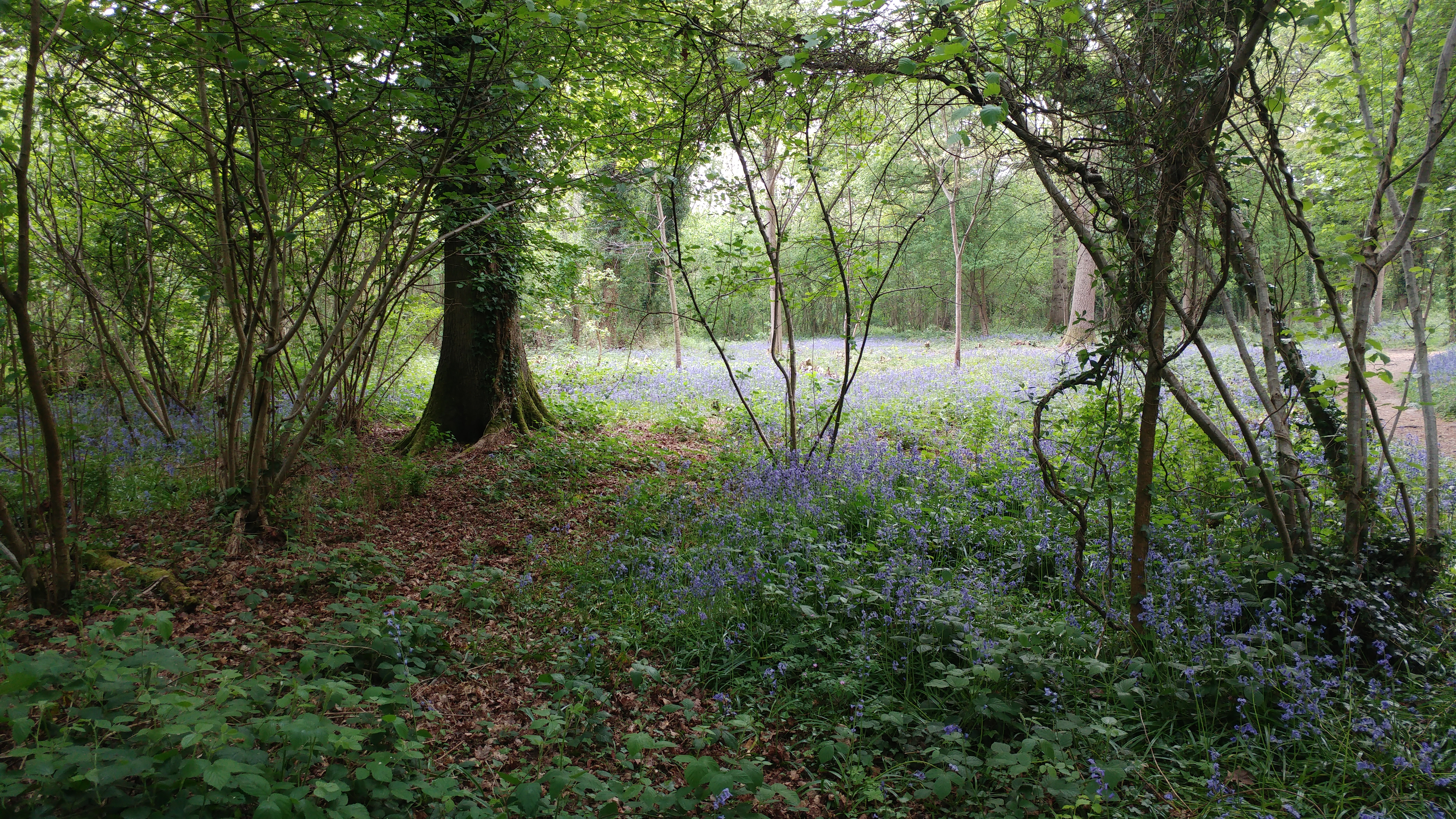
- Interactive map of Pearman's Copse
- Type: Local Nature Reserve
- Location: Lower Earley, Berkshire
- OS grid: SU 735 693
- Area: 6.9 hectares (17 acres)
- Manager: Wokingham District Council

Pearman's Copse is a 6.9-hectare (17-acre) Local Nature Reserve in Lower Earley, a suburb of Reading in Berkshire. It is owned and managed by Wokingham District Council.

== Geography and site ==
The nature reserve is 2 hectares (4.9 acres) in size. The nature reserve is ancient woodland which features coppiced areas. The reserve is surrounded by community woodland and it links with Dinton Pastures Country Park.

== History ==
In 2005 the site was declared as a local nature reserve by Wokingham Borough Council.

== Fauna ==
The site has the following fauna:

=== Invertebrates ===
- Lasius Flavus
- Lasius Niger
- Gammarus
- Asellus aquaticus
- Armadillidium vulgare
- Armadillidium nasatum
- Porcellio Scaber

=== Mammals ===
- Red fox
- Eastern Grey squirrel
- Wood mouse

=== Birds ===
- Wood pigeon
- Collared dove
- Robin
- Jay

=== Flora ===
The site has the following flora:

=== Trees ===
- Acer campestre
- Corylus avellana
- Fraxinus excelsior
- Quercus robur
