= Sindlesham =

Village in Berkshire, England

Coordinates: 51.420°N 0.887°W

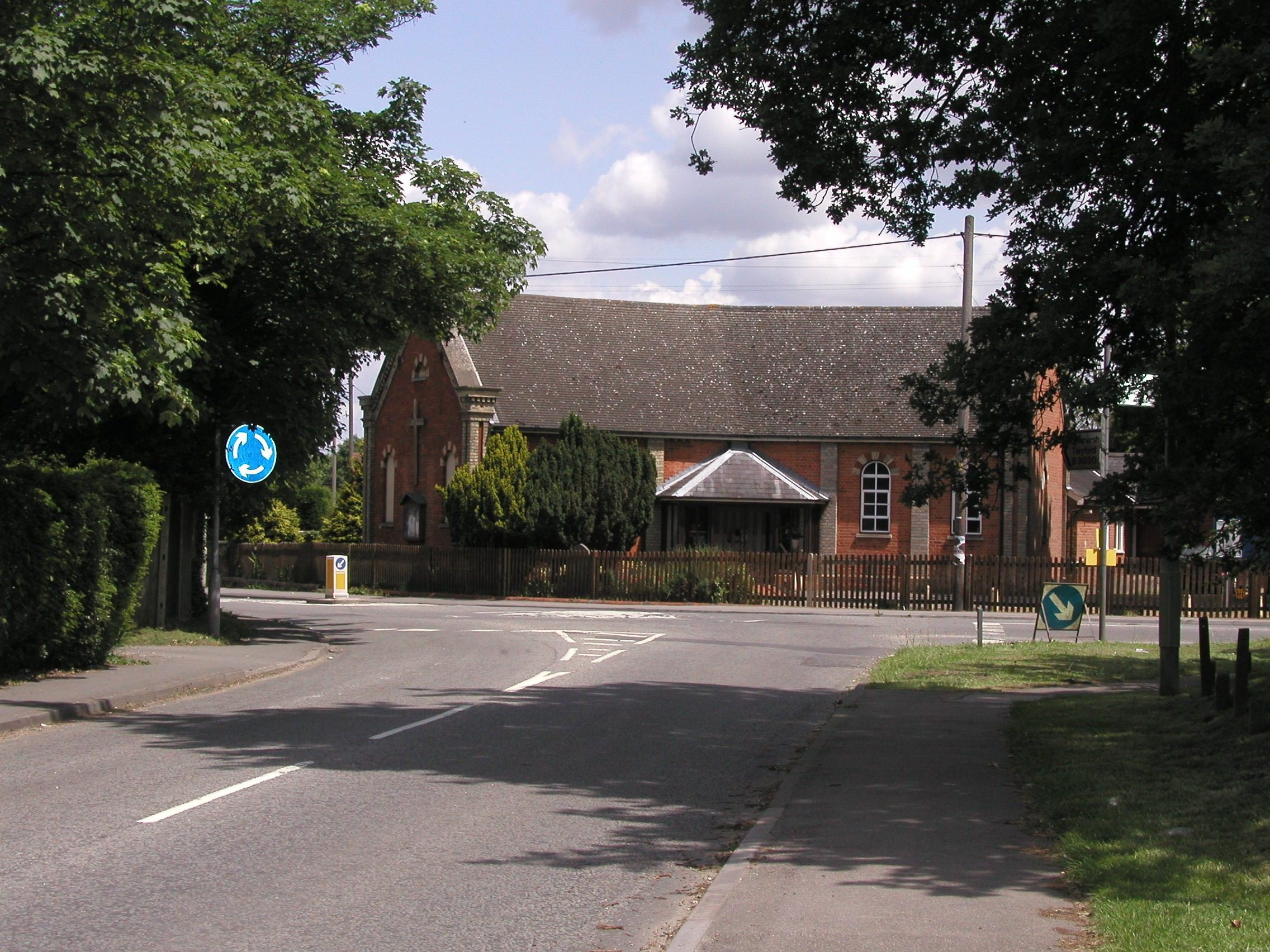
- Sindlesham Baptist Church at the centre of the village

- Location within Berkshire
- Civil parish: Winnersh
- Unitary authority: Wokingham
- Ceremonial county: Berkshire
- Region: South East
- Country: England
- Sovereign state: United Kingdom
- Post town: WOKINGHAM
- Postcode district: RG41
- Dialling code: 0118
- Police: Thames Valley
- Fire: Royal Berkshire
- Ambulance: South Central
- UK Parliament: Wokingham

Sindlesham is an estate village in the borough of Wokingham in Berkshire, England. It is located around 4 miles (6.4 km) southeast of Reading and around 6 miles (9.7 km) west of the town of Bracknell, and just south of the village of Winnersh, from which it is separated by the M4 motorway. The River Loddon flows just to the west. A chapel was built in Sindlesham as early as 1220. A large 19th-century, three-storey watermill on the Loddon has more recently become part of a hotel.

Nearby is the estate of Bearwood House, built in 1864 by John Walter, the then proprietor of The Times newspaper, now Reddam House, a private secondary school. Also in the village are Bearwood Primary School, St Catherine Bearwood Church, the offices of Winnersh Parish Council, the control centre for the National Grid covering England and Wales, and the Berkshire Masonic Centre at Sindlesham Court. Facilities in the village include a golf course (Bearwood Lakes) and the Nirvana Spa Health Club. Reading FC train out of Bearwood Park in Sindlesham.
