= Earsh =

Earsh (noun) (Old English: ersc) was used in South and West England to describe a stubble field in which a grain crop — wheat, barley or rye — had been harvested, leaving short stubble or short stalks. The field is prepared for seeding by ploughing the stubble into the ground, or burning. As the earsh decomposes, nutrients including nitrogen, phosphorus, and potassium are released back into the soil. It is frequently pronounced "ash". It is written also as arrish, arish, eddish or ersh.

== Etymology ==
The word as a description for a stubble field is found in medieval tithe maps and their apportionments, and is Saxon in origin.

Place names such as Earsham, Winnersh and Wonersh derive from their situation in an earsh field. Hazlehurst means earsh (arable) land overgrown with Hazel.

Noah Webster describes earsh as a plowed (sic) field linking it to arrish, but also to eadish which is described as latter pasture of grass that comes after mowing or reaping, called also eargrass, earsh, and etch.

== Literary references ==
Fires oft are good on barren earshes made, With crackling flames to burn the stubble blade Thomas May 1628

It can wait another day, today I will do like Tarka, and gallop joyfully through the arrish. Henry Williamson 1927

The hay was gathered from the fields, and the cattle turned onto the eddish. D H Lawrence 1913
