= Inner Distribution Road =

Ring road in Reading, Berkshire, England

Coordinates: 51°27′16.25″N 0°58′44.04″W

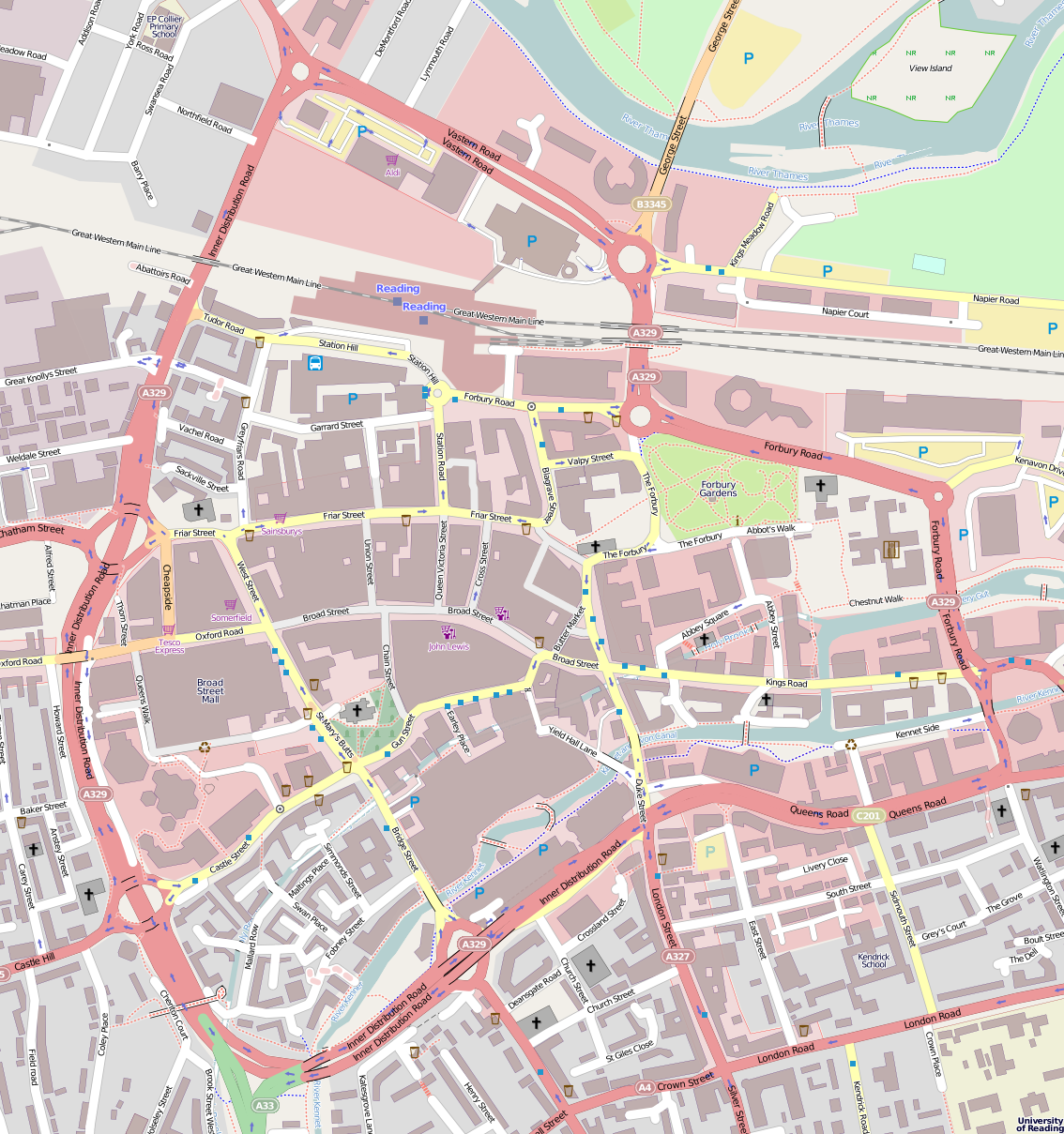
- Map of Reading Town Centre showing the Inner Distribution Road

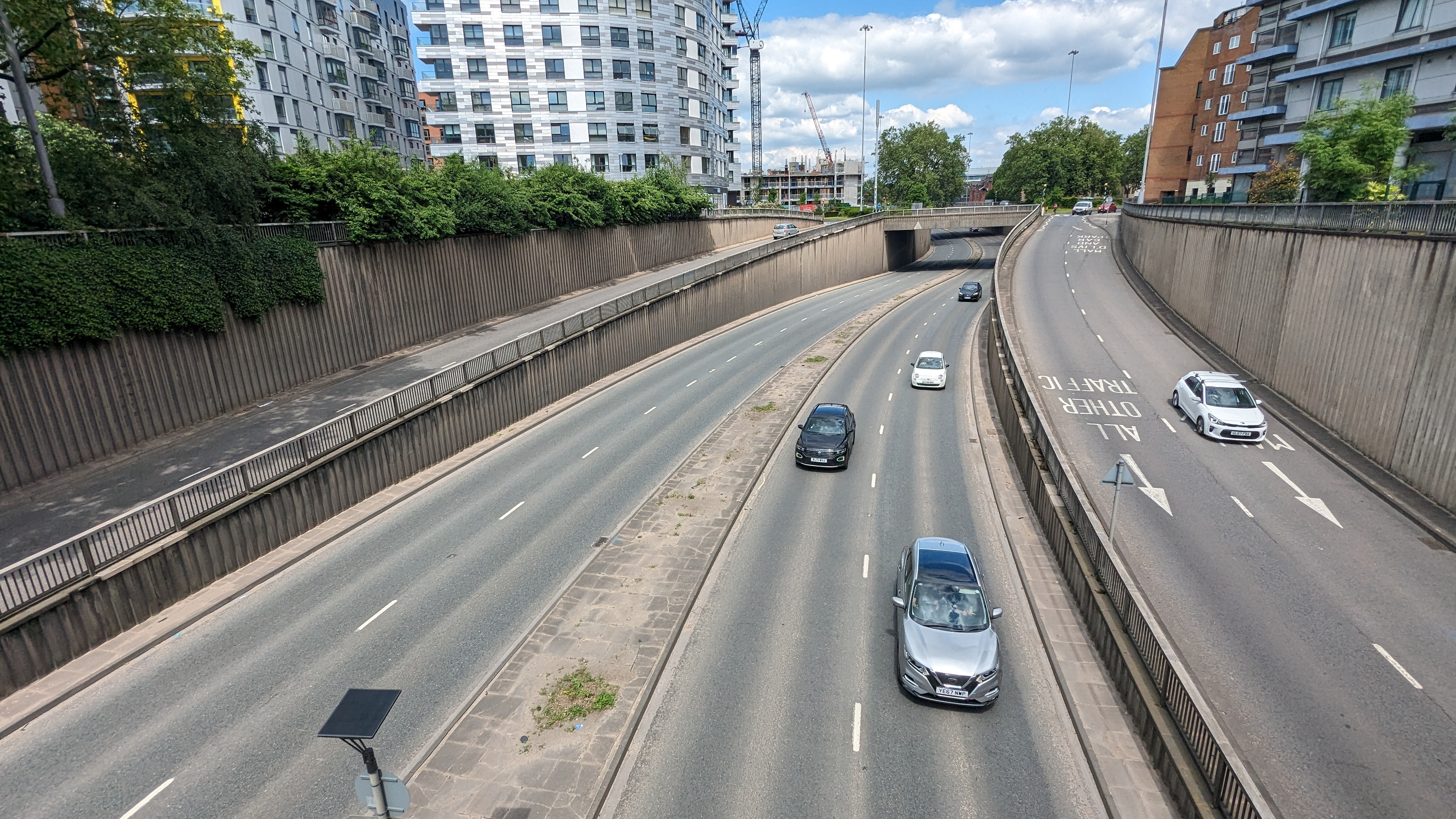

Route information
- Length: 2.4 mi (3.9 km)
- Existed: 1969–present

Major junctions
- Orbital around Reading, Berkshire
- A329 A4155; A33 A327

Location
- Country: United Kingdom
- Constituent country: England

Road network
- Roads in the United Kingdom; Motorways; A and B road zones

The Inner Distribution Road (IDR) is a mostly dual carriageway ring road that encircles the town centre of Reading, Berkshire, England. It forms part of the A329 that runs from Wentworth in Surrey to Thame in Oxfordshire.

== History ==
The Inner Distribution Road was proposed as a radical solution to the regular build up of traffic in the town centre, and the air and noise pollution that accompanied it. It opened in 1969, after much controversy because the route necessitated the destruction of several central Reading neighbourhoods. Due to unforeseen financial problems it remained incomplete until 1989.

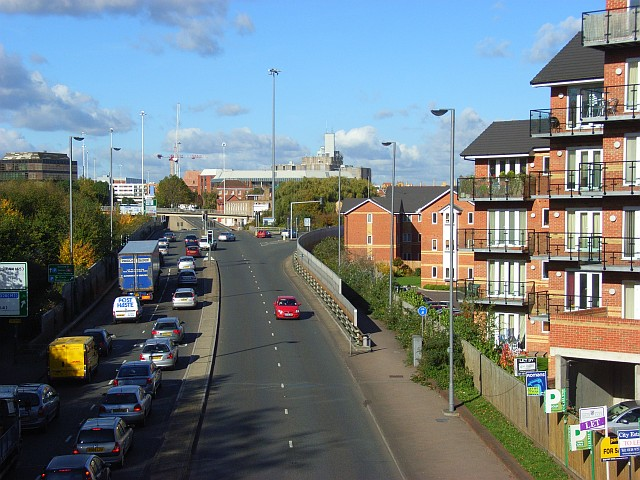
The A33 ends at the Inner Distribution Road

== Other plans ==
Reading Borough Council drew up plans in 2006 for the Inner Distribution Road to become an anti-clockwise one-way traffic route to help the traffic keep moving. In 2006 local radio station Reading 107 conducted a survey asking if the road should become a one-way system, over 90% of people thought that there should be a public enquiry before any proposed changes go ahead. Plans were put on hold in 2010.

Development plans created in 2003 to build a deck over the Inner Distribution Road to enable the expansion of Chatham Place were abandoned in 2009. Speaking at an event to mark the completion of the Chatham Place redevelopment in February 2016, Tony Page, Deputy Leader of the council, said "Part of our vision for this area is to one day cover over the IDR to shield off all of the noise; it is an aspiration that we intend to work on in the future."
