= The Forest School, Winnersh =

The Forest School
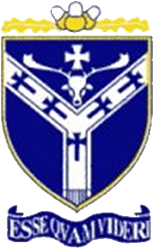
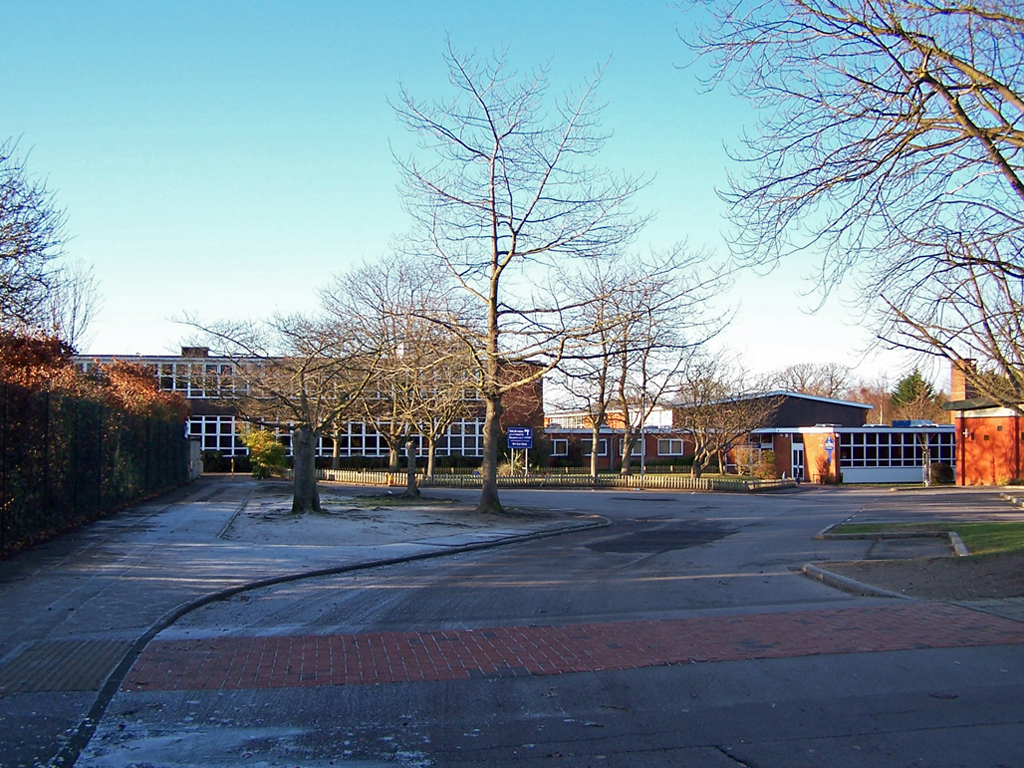
- School badge The Forest School building

Location
- Robin Hood Lane; Winnersh; Wokingham, Berkshire, RG41 5NE; England; 51.43174°N 0.87773°W

Information
- Type: Academy
- Motto: Esse Quam Videri
- Established: 1957
- Founder: Walter G. Jackson
- Department for Education URN: 139853 Tables
- Ofsted: Reports
- Chair: Alison Loveland
- Headteacher: Shirley Austin
- Staff: 210
- Gender: Co-educational
- Age: 11 to 18
- Enrolment: 1200
- Houses: Ashdown, Bramshill, Kielder, Langdale, New, Sherwood, Windsor
- Colour
- Formerly named: Forest Grammar School
- Gender of sixth form: Boys and girls
- Website: The Forest School

The Forest School is an 11-18 co-educational secondary school located in Winnersh, Berkshire, England. It is located on Robin Hood Lane, the B3030 road, next to Winnersh railway station. Originally, participation in Years 7-11 was limited to boys. The school changed its status to co-educational from 4th September 2024. Since September 2012, the Forest has educated academy players from local Football League Championship football club Reading FC.

== History ==
The Forest School began as Woodley Hill Grammar School in 1957, becoming the Forest Grammar School. The school was founded by Walter G. Jackson (also the mayor of Wokingham in 1953), the first headmaster of the school. Jackson retired in 1968, to be replaced by J.F.F. (Jack) Pearcy.

In November 1965, the Nestlé company donated an Elliott 405 computer to the school, which was a first generation valve computer. The BBC science television programme Tomorrow's World broadcast a story on 5 February 1969 about how the school used this computer to teach the pupils.

The Forest School became a comprehensive school in 1974. It has been a Business and Enterprise College since 2003 and was appointed by the Specialist Schools and Academies Trust as the "Enterprise Hub School for Berkshire" in 2006. On 1 July 2013, Forest School formally converted to academy status.

== School Structure ==
=== House system ===
There are currently seven houses at The Forest School, all named after large forests in England. Boys are given a house upon entry in Year 7, and any future siblings are placed in the same house. The houses were assigned animals in September 2015. The school deems the house system to be an integral part of school life, providing opportunities for boys attending the school to "engage in a wide range of activities in which they can experience friendly competition and rivalry".

=== Pastoral care ===
Whenever possible, students keep the same Form Tutor and Head of Year throughout Years 7–11. The school currently has a 'Drop In Centre' which consists of the Pastoral Support Officer's office, confidentiality boxes, support rooms and the school counsellor's office for each year group. A comprehensive PSHE programme is run within the school for 20 minutes each day, following a 5 minute registration.

=== Business and Enterprise specialism ===
As a Business and Enterprise specialist, the school encourages pupils to develop their own businesses. Students are involved in managing a business, talking to potential clients, producing quotes and providing goods and services to both internal and external clients.

=== Forest Sixth ===
The school won a bid in early 2014 to build a new sixth form centre. The planning application was approved on Monday 19 January 2015. The building has ten classrooms, ICT work space, a lecture theatre and a cafe.

== Subjects taught ==
=== Curriculum subjects ===
Subject	Taught at KS3	Taught at GCSE	Taught at A level
Art	Compulsory	Yes	Yes
Biology	Part of Science	Compulsory	Yes
Business Studies	No	Yes	Yes
Chemistry	Part of Science	Compulsory	Yes
Computer science	Yes	Yes (and ICT)	Yes
Design Technology	Compulsory	Yes^	Yes
Drama	Compulsory	Yes	Yes
Economics	No	Yes	Yes
English	Compulsory	Compulsory	Yes
French	Compulsory	Yes	No
Geography	Compulsory	Yes	Yes
History	Compulsory	Yes	Yes
Law	No	No	Yes
Mathematics*	Compulsory	Compulsory	Yes
Media Studies	No	Yes	Yes
Music	Compulsory	Yes	No
Photography	No	Yes	Yes
Psychology	No	No	Yes
Physical education	Compulsory	Yes	Yes
Physics	Part of Science	Compulsory	Yes
PSHE	Yes	Yes	Yes
Religious Education	Compulsory	Compulsory	Not timetabled
Sociology	No	Yes	Yes
Spanish	Yes	Yes	No
Travel & Tourism	No	No	Yes

* Further Maths is optional at A Level. ^ Students can opt for one of the following: Electronics, Graphics or Product Design.

=== Sports ===
In 2006 the school's under 15s (U15) football team won the National Cup. In 2007 the school's under 16s (U16) football team were runners up in the National Cup, losing narrowly to the opposition. In 2009 the school's under 14s (U14) football team were runners up in the National Cup, losing 2–1 to Audenshaw School. The match took place at Manchester United's Old Trafford Stadium in front of over 600 Forest School supporters.

The school has also produced several rugby players, the most notable being Rhodri McAtee, ex-England school boy who is now consistently selected for the Welsh International Sevens team, whilst playing for Cornish Pirates in National League One.

== Notable former pupils ==
=== The Forest School ===
- Jake Cooper, footballer, defender at Millwall F.C.
- Tyler Frost, footballer, midfielder at Farnborough F.C.
- Daniel Howell – YouTube personality and former BBC Radio 1 DJ
- Danny Kingston – European Judo Champion 1996
- Steven Lewington – former professional wrestler, known for performing as DJ Gabriel on ECW
- Mark Littlewood – political commentator and director general of the Institute of Economic Affairs
- Danny Loader, footballer, forward at FC Porto
- Rhodri McAtee – ex-England school boy and former winger for Wales Sevens
- Gabriel Osho, footballer, defender at Luton Town F.C.
- Ian Parton – lead singer and founder of the Go! Team
- Steve Seddon, footballer, defender at Birmingham City F.C.
- Johnny Williams – rugby union player at Scarlets
- Marcus Willis – tennis player
- Joshua Zeller – athlete
- Nathan Tyson − former professional footballer

=== Forest Grammar School ===
- Ivor Goodson, academic and educationalist
