= M31 motorway =

Proposed road in England

Coordinates: 51.4160°N 0.8042°W

M31

Route information
- Length: 22.0 mi (35.4 km)
- Status: Unbuilt
- History: Never built; partially completed as A329(M) and A3290

Major junctions
- southeast end: M25 motorway
- M3 motorway M4 motorway
- northwest end: M4

Location
- Country: United Kingdom
- Primary destinations: Bracknell; Wokingham; Reading

Road network
- Roads in the United Kingdom; Motorways; A and B road zones

The M31 was planned as a Reading to M3 motorway which was dubbed the 'M3 – M4 link motorway'. It would have provided a direct high-speed route between the two motorways. The motorway was planned at the same time as the largely unrealised London Ringways scheme and an additional section was planned that would have taken the M31 south and east from the M3 to connect to the scheme's Ringway 4 (now the M25) providing a shorter route for traffic travelling between the west and Surrey and Kent.

Only part of the planned route was built; it bears the designations A329(M) and A3290. Had the motorway been constructed it would have provided an alternative to the south-west section of the M25, reducing the motorway journey between Reading and Byfleet by approximately 10 miles (16 km) and alleviating traffic on what is the M25's busiest section.
