= Hurst, Berkshire =

Coordinates: 51°27′29″N 0°51′07″W

Hurst
- Village
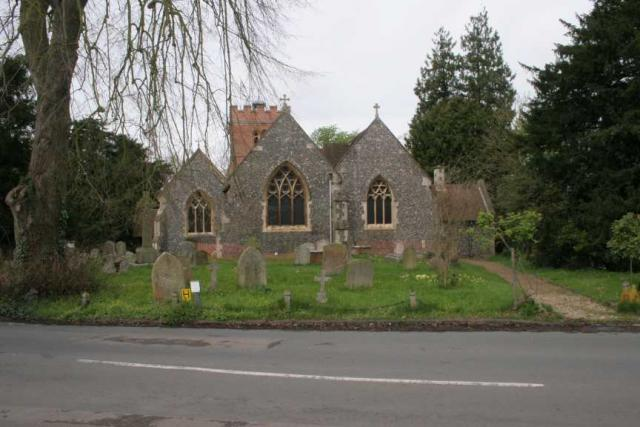
- St Nicholas' parish church

- Location within Berkshire
- Population: 2,074 (2021 estimate)
- OS grid reference: SU799738
- Civil parish: St Nicholas Hurst
- Unitary authority: Wokingham
- Ceremonial county: Berkshire
- Region: South East
- Country: England
- Sovereign state: United Kingdom
- Post town: Reading
- Postcode district: RG10
- Post town: Wokingham
- Postcode district: RG40
- Dialling code: 0118; 01344
- Police: Thames Valley
- Fire: Royal Berkshire
- Ambulance: South Central
- UK Parliament: Wokingham
- Website: Hurst Parish Council

Hurst is a village in the civil parish of St Nicholas Hurst in the Borough of Wokingham, Berkshire, England. The village lies between Twyford and Wokingham, about 1.5 miles (2.4 km) north of the M4 motorway.

== Geography ==
The parish of St Nicholas Hurst is about 4 miles (6.4 km) north of Wokingham and 2 miles (3 km) south of Twyford in the county of Berkshire. It covers about 2.5 square miles (6.5 km^{2}) and is the largest civil parish in the Borough of Wokingham. The village is on the A321 Twyford – Wokingham road. There are a number of other smaller areas of sporadic development, the main ones being along Davis Street on the B3030 Twyford – Winnersh road, along the B3034 Forest Road, from Bill Hill to Binfield and on Broadcommon Road.

The River Loddon flows north along the western side of the parish and a substantial proportion of the parish lies within the alluvial flood plain of this river and its tributaries. The most important exceptions to this are Church Hill just to the west of the village centre, and Ashridge to the south-east. The M4 motorway crosses the southern half of the parish but does not have any direct access within the parish. The A329(M) forms the south-west boundary, separating Hurst from Wokingham and Winnersh. The main London to Bristol railway line runs along the northern boundary, and Twyford station in the neighbouring parish of Twyford serves Hurst. Dinton Pastures Country Park is a country park within Hurst.

== Notable buildings ==
=== Parish church ===
The Church of England parish church is dedicated to St Nicholas. The Grade I listed building is partly Norman and partly later medieval. The tower is of brick and was built in 1612. It contains eight bells, the largest six of which were cast in the 17th century; the two lightest bells were added in 1911. The church was restored in the 19th century by W. Fellows Prynne. There are many monuments of the 17th and 18th centuries, and much 17th-century woodwork. Burial monuments include those of Lady Margaret Savile (d. 1631), widow of Sir Henry Savile, Provost of Eton College.

=== Country houses ===
Bill Hill, on the Twyford Road, is an Early Georgian house which was probably built by Sir Montague Blundell just after 1720. It was later the home of the Leveson-Gower family. Work on the house was done by Henry Flitcroft in c. 1735–6 and Matthew Brettingham in 1746.

Haineshill (Haines Hill House), on the B3018 east of Hurst, is a substantial Grade II* listed house built in c. 1630–1635 for Sir Francis Windebank and extended by James Edward Colleton in 1760. The house was later owned by Thomas Colleton Garth, who founded the Garth Hunt, first meeting there in 1852.

Hinton House, on Hinton Road, also Grade II* listed, was built c. 1600–1620 in red brick for William Hide. It was most recently part of the Dolphin School. The house incorporates an innovative 'triple pile' plan, where the hall and parlour are placed next to each other, with the service rooms to the rear, and separated by a corridor containing the staircase. This layout was a "radical departure from conventional domestic planning", anticipating later architectural developments. Land around the house was anciently a liberty known as Broad Hinton, and was a detached part of Wiltshire until the Counties (Detached Parts) Act 1844 transferred the liberty to Berkshire.

Hurst House, northwest of the church, was built in 1847 for Archibald Cameron, vicar of Hurst, and incorporates an older house built in 1530 by Richard Warde, who was sub-Treasurer of Henry VIII and later a member of Parliament for Berkshire and Windsor.

Hurst Lodge, on Broadcommon Road, is a Grade II* listed 17th-century house built for the Barker family, and later the property of the Countess of Buchan. Barkers almshouses on Church Hill were erected and founded in 1664 by William Barker of Hurst Lodge.

Stanlake Park, just northwest of Hinton House, is a large gabled brick house that was probably built by Richard Aldworth, a grocer from London, beginning in c. 1610.

== Local government ==
St Nicholas Hurst is a civil parish with an elected parish council. It falls within the area of the unitary authority of Wokingham Borough. Both the parish council and the unitary authority are responsible for different aspects of local government.

== Education ==
St Nicholas' Church of England Primary School is a voluntary controlled primary school in the village which educates children aged 5–11. The school was built in 1843. The primary school shares a breakfast club with St. Nicholas Pre-school playgroup, a registered charity and member of the Pre-school Learning Alliance, which is open to all students and children of the playgroup. Dolphin School is a coeducational, independent preparatory day school and nursery school for children between the ages of 3 and 13.
