= A329 road =

East-west road in Southern England

A329

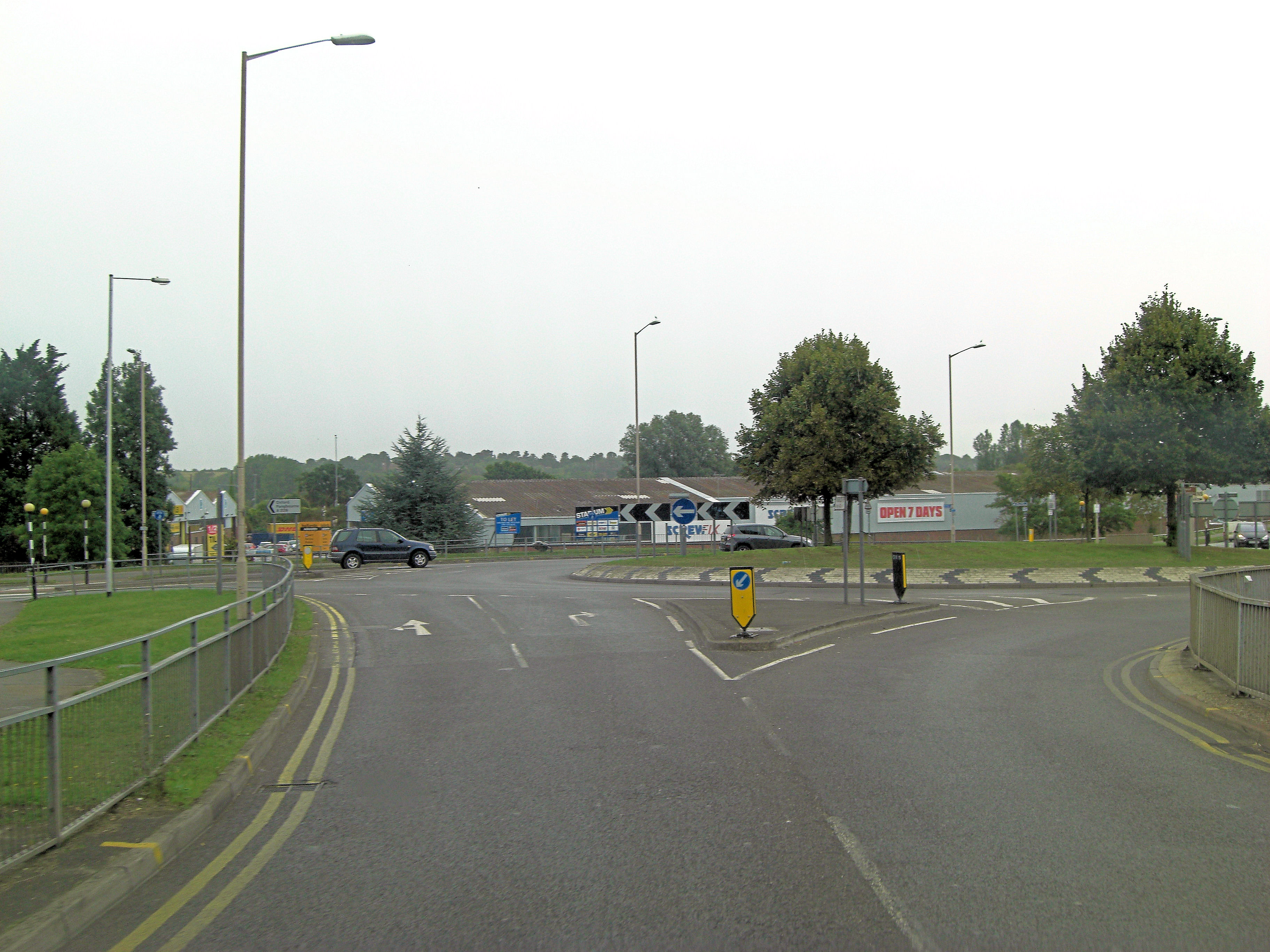
- Norcott Road Junction with A329

Major junctions
- East end: Wentworth, near Virginia Water
- A30 A330 A322 A329(M) motorway A4; A33 A340 A417 M40; A40 A418
- West end: Thame

Location
- Country: United Kingdom
- Primary destinations: Bracknell; Reading

Road network
- Roads in the United Kingdom; Motorways; A and B road zones

The A329 is an east–west road in Southern England that runs from Wentworth in Surrey to Thame in Oxfordshire.

== Route ==
The A329 starts at the A30 in Surrey and passes through Ascot, Bracknell, Wokingham, and Earley until it reaches Reading at the Three Tuns crossroad.

From the Three Tuns, the A329 follows Wokingham Road, King's Road, the Inner Distribution Road, Chatham Street and Oxford Road through the borough, before passing into Purley. Within Reading, the A329 connects with the A327, A33, A4, A4074 and A4155 roads.

From Purley, the road passes through Pangbourne, Lower Basildon, Streatley, Moulsford and Wallingford. It connects to junction 10 of the M4 via the A329(M) and later to junction 7 of the M40 before finally ending at a junction with the A418 at Thame.

== History ==
The A329 originally (in 1922) terminated at Reading. In the 1930s it was extended to Shillingford on part of the route of the former A42. After the M40 motorway was opened in the 1970s it was extended to Thame on the former route of the B4013. In 1993, when the new Winterbrook Bridge enabled traffic to by-pass Wallingford, the section between Wallingford and Shillingford was downgraded to become an unclassified road.

== Carriageways ==
Most of the road is single carriageway, apart from the section through Bracknell, and in central Reading. In Reading the road is dualled where it forms the Inner Distribution Road. In Bracknell the A329 originally ran along the High Street (now pedestrianised) and continued west along the Wokingham Road (now B3408). Today the original London Road is dualled for a short section approaching the Met Office Roundabout. The dual carriageway then by-passes north of the pedestrianised town centre to the Giroscope Roundabout, where it crosses the former route, heading south west to the Twin Bridges roundabout and along the dual Berkshire Way to meet the old route at Amen Corner. Here the A329 continues into Wokingham on the original route, while the A329(M) by-passes to the north.
