= A329(M) motorway =

Road in England

A329(M)
- A329(M) highlighted in blue

Route information
- Maintained by Wokingham Borough Council
- Length: 4 mi (6.4 km)
- Existed: 1972–present
- History: Constructed 1972–75

Major junctions
- Southeast end: Bracknell
- A329 A3290; M4 motorway
- Northwest end: Winnersh

Location
- Country: United Kingdom
- Primary destinations: Bracknell; Reading,

Road network
- Roads in the United Kingdom; Motorways; A and B road zones
← A308(M)	→ A404(M)

The A329(M) is a motorway in Berkshire, England. It is 4 miles (6.4 km) long and runs from the west of Bracknell to the north west of Winnersh. It is one of a small number of parts of the motorway system in England that are managed by the local highway authority, in this case Wokingham Borough Council, rather than National Highways.

== Route ==
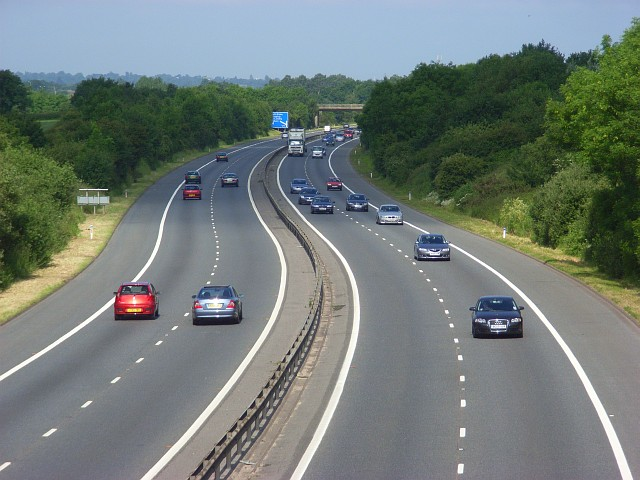
A329(M) motorway near Wokingham

From southeast to northwest, the route starts to the north of Bracknell and runs directly from the A329. It passes east of Wokingham in countryside. It then crosses the M4, continues northwest and meets the A3290 at Winnersh Triangle west of which see the status-downgraded A3290 road, to the junction with the A4. It is managed locally, by Wokingham Borough Council, rather than by National Highways.

== History ==
The first section of the road opened in 1973, and went from the Winnersh junction to a temporary terminus at the A321.

A further section to the North/West of Winnersh — due to open at the same time — took the road up to the junction with the A4 to the east of Reading, running to the north of the railway line and dividing the Earley area of Reading almost in two. However the opening of this section was delayed due to the collapse of the Loddon Viaduct on 24 October 1972, which killed three people and injured ten others. This section subsequently opened in 1974.

The third and final section to be completed was the southern section of the motorway which was built to a standard dual two lane motorway specification (D2), and was opened in 1975. This extended the road to the A329 and B3408 junction at Amen Corner roundabout. The section of Berkshire Way (and the construction of the flyover) came some years later, allowing traffic to flow from Reading and the M4 past the official end of the motorway onto the Southern and Western industrial areas of Bracknell.

The large free-flow interchange between the A329(M) and the M4 was constructed as part of plans for an M31 motorway, which was originally planned to extend down to the M3 (and possibly beyond) in the south.

In the early nineties, the section of the A329(M) that met the A4 east of Reading was downgraded to an A road to enable the hard shoulder to be used by a park-and-ride bus service. It was then renamed the A3290. The Park and Ride bus service car park is subject to flooding and this causes frequent closures of the service.

A feature of the A329(M) is its wide grass central reservation north of the M4. The cross-section of the motorway was built in this way to support future widening to dual-three lane standard, which was never introduced: the later southern section to Amen Corner lacks this provision. Because of this wide central reservation, the A329 (M) was formerly one of the only motorways in the United Kingdom to have no central barriers on some stretches. However, as of 2010, almost the entire length of the road has had a central reservation barrier installed.

In 2006, on an area to the south of the A329(M) just beyond the actual designated motorway section, construction began on a new housing development—Jennett's Park. A new roundabout retaining an eastbound through lane was built on the A329 to provide access to this development. It was finished in early 2011.

In 2015, the A329(M) was reduced to a single lane each way through junction 10 by Highways England.

=== Death of construction workers ===
The formwork over its new River Loddon bridge should have supported the concrete while being poured but collapsed. Three men died and ten were injured in the wreckage. The Bragg report considered why this happened and made recommendations as to how formwork should be designed and tested, to make bridge construction safer. Around 500 tons of concrete, with the steelwork and planking that should have supported it, dropped 40 feet (12 m) into the river. It was the eighth span of a total of 33 which make up the viaduct.

== Junctions ==
Note: motorway has no junction numbers

A329(M) motorway junctions
Northwestbound exits	Junction	Southeastbound exits
Road continues as A3290 to Reading (East)	A3290; Terminus	Winnersh, Woodley (A329) (M4) Wokingham, Bracknell A329(M)
Earley, Winnersh, Woodley (A329)	A3290; Terminus	Start of motorway
London M4(E); South Wales, Newbury, Reading (Central, S & W) M4(W)	M4 J10; Partial cloverleaf interchange	South Wales, Newbury M4(W), London M4(E)
Start of motorway	Terminus; A329	Wokingham A329, Binfield B3408
(M4) Reading, Earley, Winnersh, Woodley A329(M); Wokingham A329, Binfield B3408	Terminus; A329	Road continues as A329 to Bracknell and Ascot

== See also ==
- List of motorways in the United Kingdom
