= Borough of Wokingham =

Unitary authority area in Berkshire, England

- Unitary authority and Borough
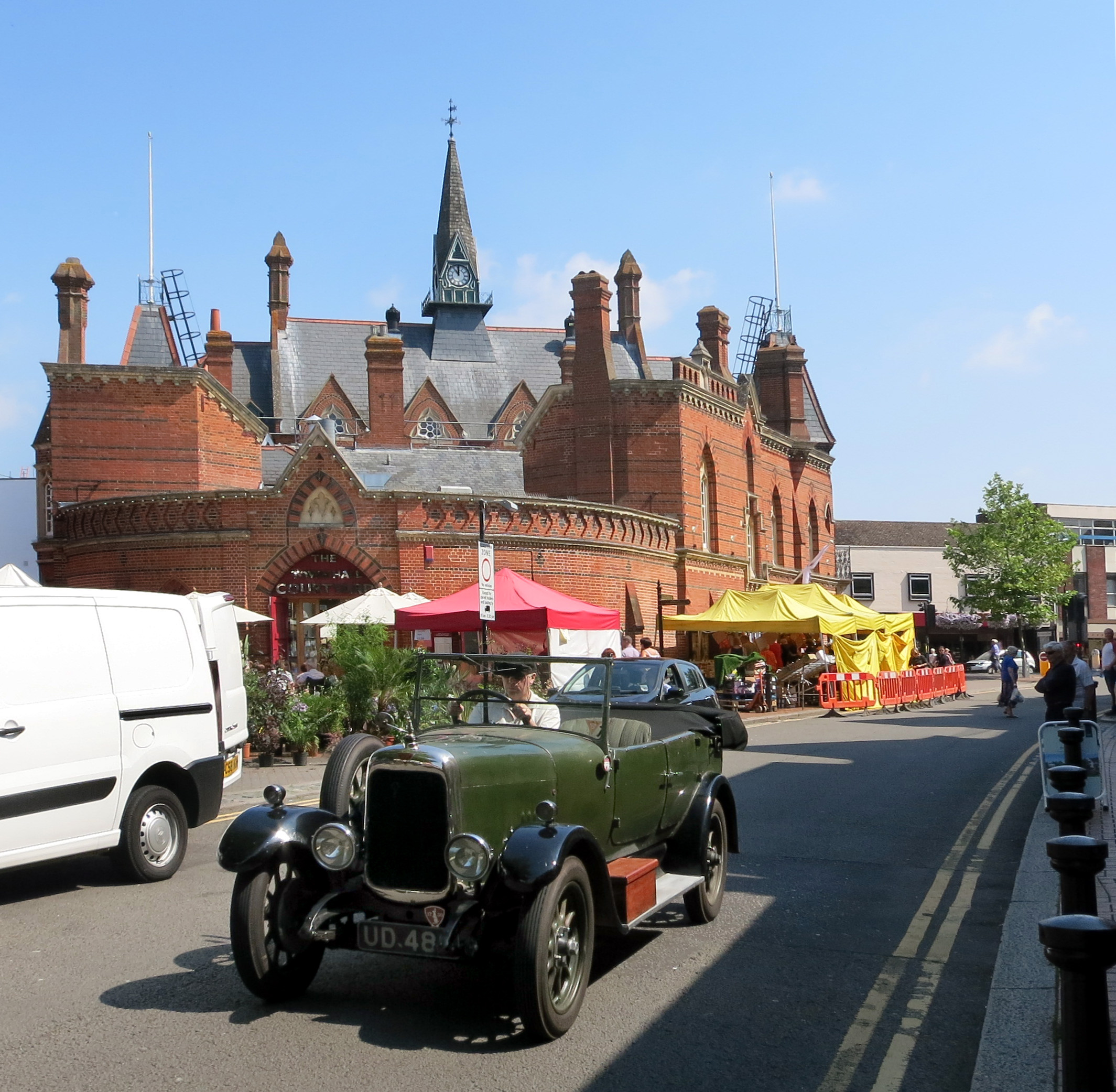
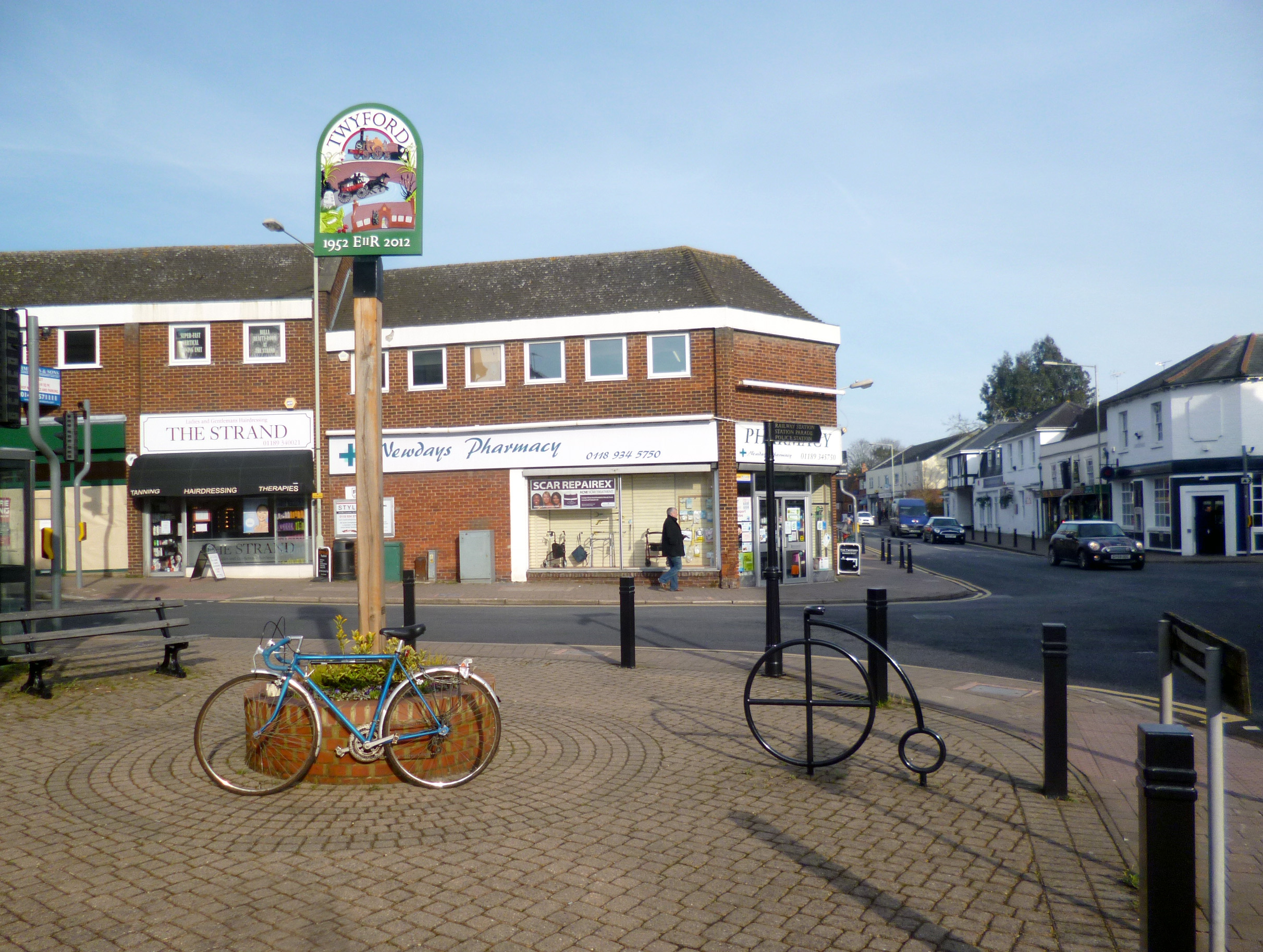
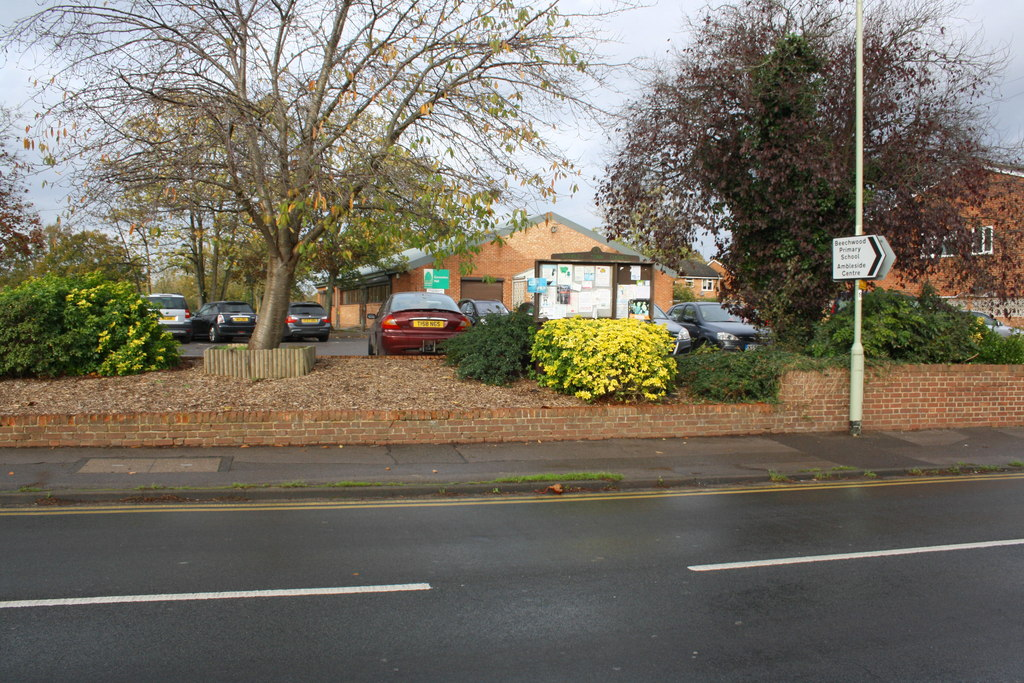
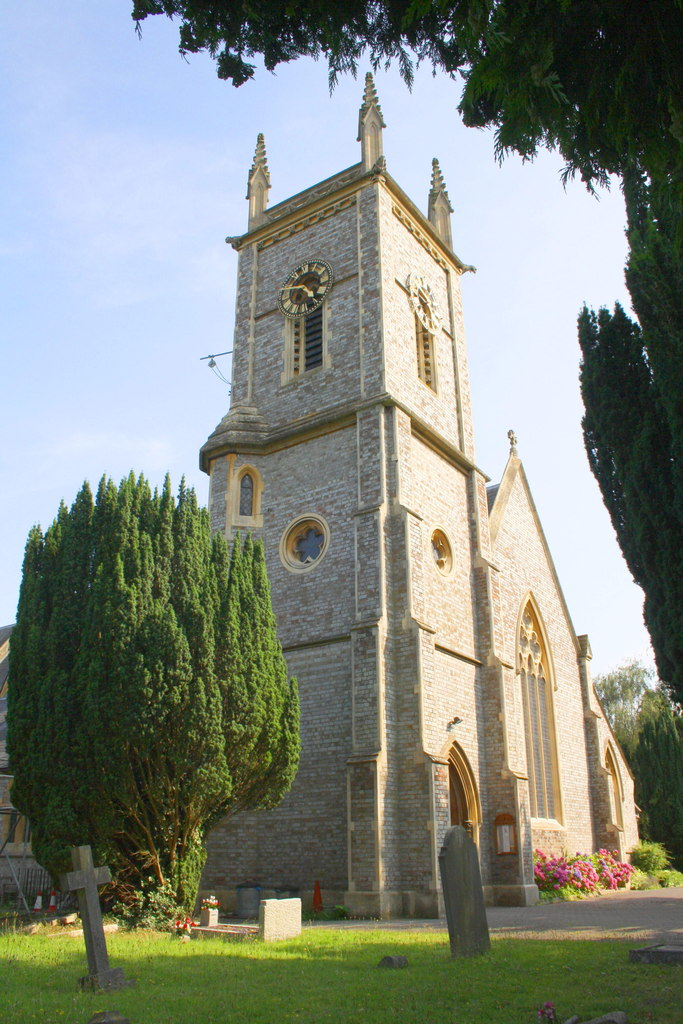
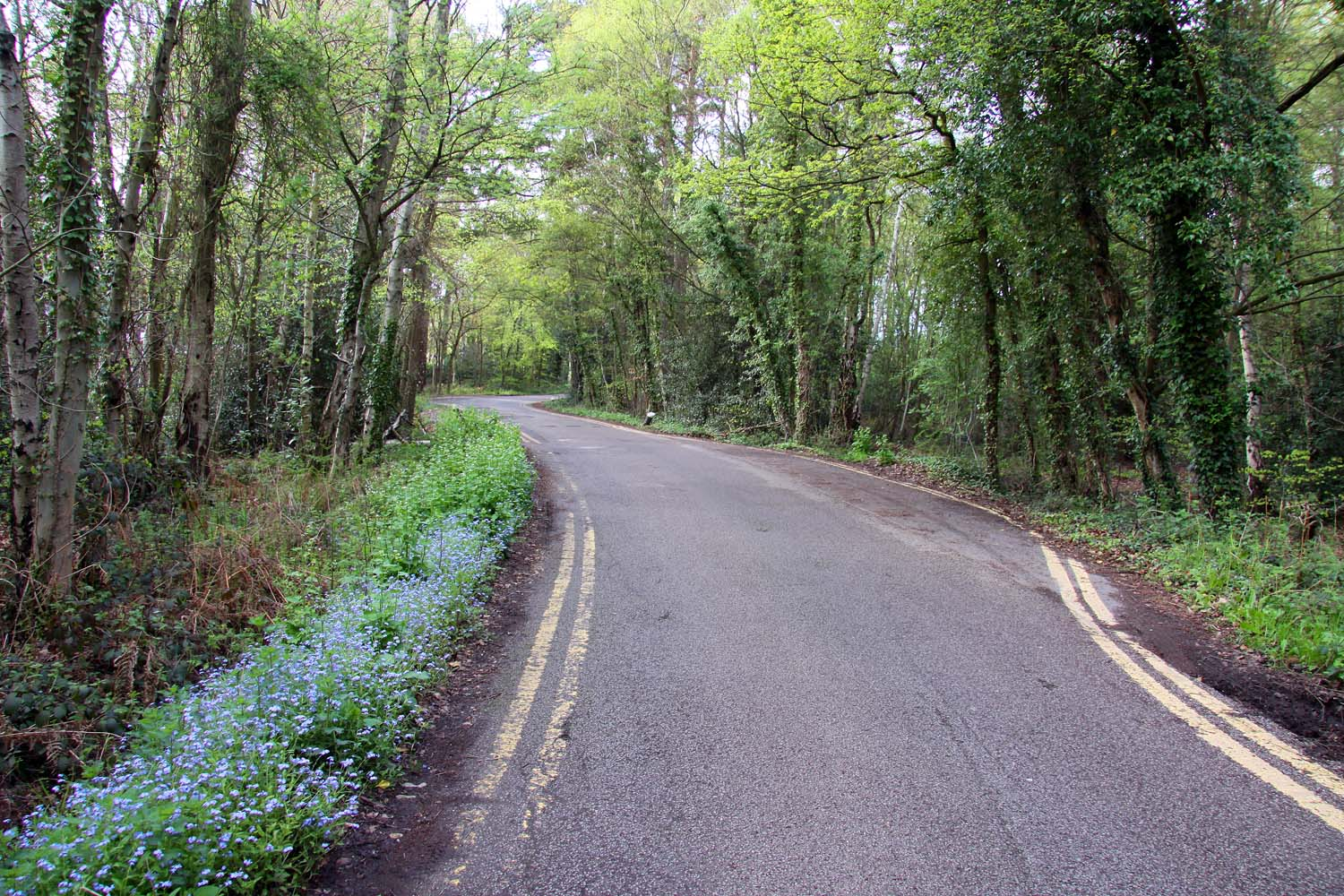
- From left to right; Top: Wokingham town hall; Middle: Twyford village centre and Woodley Coronation Hall; Bottom: Earley St Peter's Church and the California Country Park near Arborfield Green

- Shown within Berkshire
- Coordinates: 51°24′37″N 0°50′36″W
- Sovereign state: United Kingdom
- Constituent country: England
- Region: South East England
- Ceremonial county: Berkshire
- Status: Unitary authority
- Incorporated: 1 April 1974
- Admin HQ: Wokingham

Government
  - Type: Unitary authority
  - Body: Wokingham Borough Council
  - Leadership: Leader & Cabinet

Area
  - Total: 69.10 sq mi (178.98 km^{2})
  - Rank: 152nd (of 296)

Population (2021)
  - Total: 177,500
  - Rank: 116th (of 296)
  - Density: 2,570/sq mi (992/km^{2})

Ethnicity (2021)
  - Ethnic groups: List: 79.9% White; 12.9% Asian; 3.1% Mixed; 2.4% Black; 1.6% other

Religion (2021)
  - Religion: List: 44.7% Christianity; 36.9% no religion; 13.6% other; 4.8% Islam
- Time zone: UTC0 (GMT)
  - Summer (DST): UTC+1 (BST)
- ISO 3166: GB-WOK
- ONS code: 00MF (ONS) E06000041 (GSS)
- OS grid reference: SU805685
- Website: www.wokingham.gov.uk

Wokingham, or the Borough of Wokingham, is a local government district with borough status in Berkshire, England. Since 1998 its council has been a unitary authority, having taken on county-level functions when Berkshire County Council was abolished. The borough is named after its main town, Wokingham. Other places in the district include Arborfield, Barkham, Charvil, Earley, Finchampstead, Hurst, Remenham, Ruscombe, Shinfield, Sonning, Spencers Wood, Three Mile Cross, Twyford, Wargrave, Winnersh and Woodley. Part of Crowthorne is also within the borough and forms part of the parish of Wokingham Without. The population of the borough is 177,500 according to 2021 census.

== History ==
The district was formed on 1 April 1974 as Wokingham District, under the Local Government Act 1972, by the merger of the Municipal Borough of Wokingham and Wokingham Rural District. It is governed by Wokingham Borough Council (formerly Wokingham District Council), which has been a unitary authority since 1 April 1998, following the abolition of Berkshire County Council under the Banham Review. The district was granted borough status in 2007, following a petition to the Queen.

== Geography ==
Elevations range between 30 and 70 metres above sea level except higher in about 5% of the borough. The highest is an escarpment containing parts of the rural and wooded northern area, the hinterland of three Thames-side villages, facing the 30-mile long Chilterns AONB, west and north. A geological part of that range of hills, Bowsey Hill reaches 137m, in Wargrave civil parish, 1 mile (1.6 km) from the river.

Approximately a right-angled triangle, the borough is long north to south. It uses as its longest edge the course of the Loddon and Thames along its north-west, with a similarly salient-containing eastern boundary and an almost straight southern boundary. Clockwise the boundaries are approximately 10, 8 and 5 miles on a direct path from point to point. The southern boundary is approximately the Roman road from London to Bath through a highly coniferous Swinley Forest which sits in geology on the naturally acidic, Bagshot Formation.

The whole borough is divided into civil parishes. The parish councils of Wokingham, Earley and Woodley have officially declared their parishes to be towns, allowing them to take the style 'town council'. Other parishes are Arborfield & Newland, Barkham, Charvil, Finchampstead, Remenham, Ruscombe, Shinfield, Sonning, St Nicholas Hurst, Swallowfield, Twyford, Wargrave and Winnersh. The other parish is Wokingham Without which takes its name from the countryside outside of the urban area of Wokingham.

Two villages have a wide range of small retail and visitor facilities: Wargrave and Twyford. In major employment areas of trading and manufacturing Winnersh and Finchampstead are prominent. The village of Crowthorne is shared between Wokingham and the neighbouring borough of Bracknell Forest. The area has come under extreme pressure to provide more housing in recent years and the council has followed a policy of identifying four strategic development locations referred to as Arborfield Garrison, South of the M4, North and South Wokingham. Much of these have already been built out or largely completed, with South Wokingham being the least complete.

== Governance ==
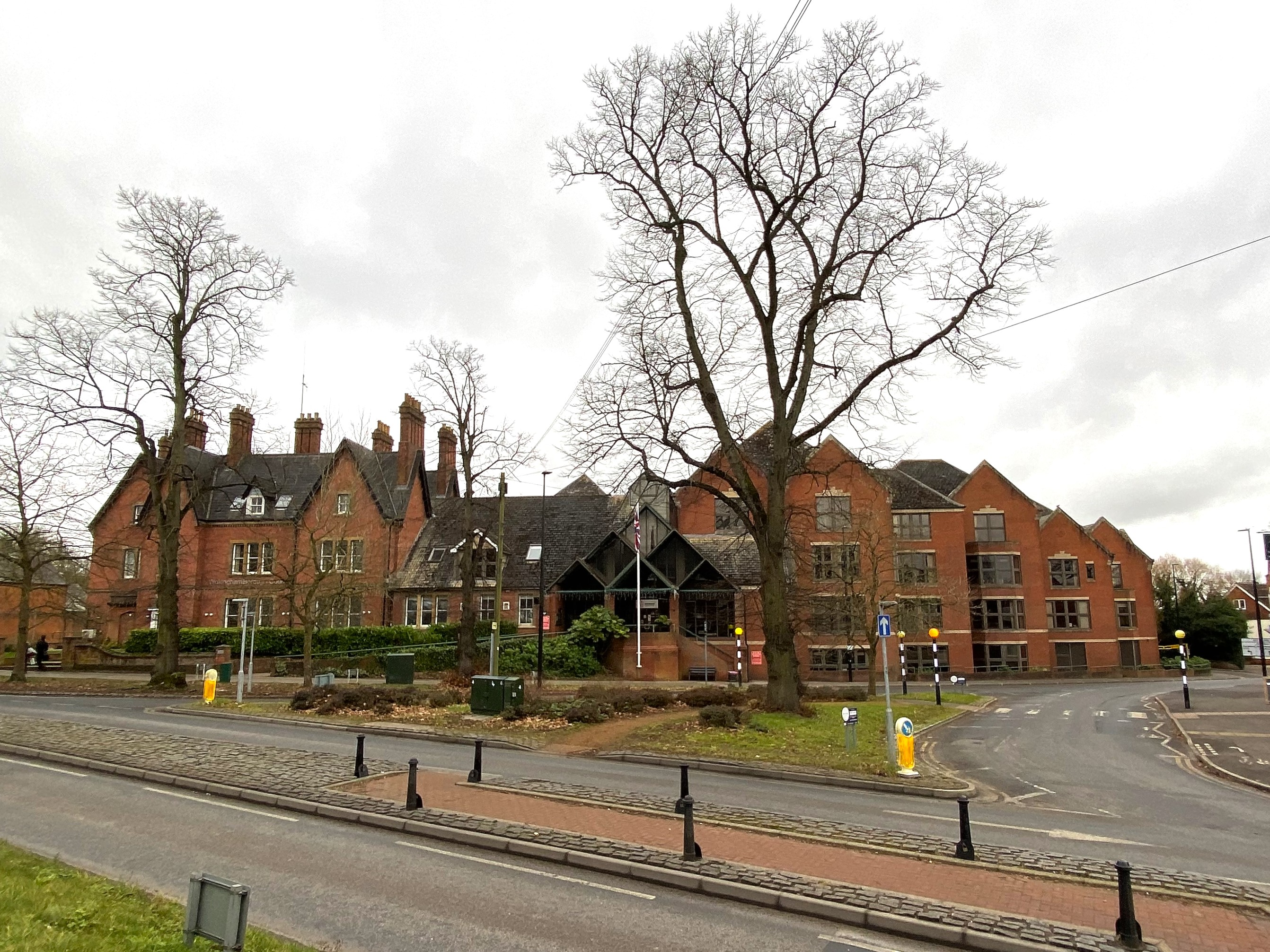
Civic Offices, Shute End, Wokingham

The local authority is Wokingham Borough Council, which has its headquarters at Shute End in Wokingham.

== Education ==
State-funded schools in the borough include nine secondary schools, two special schools and numerous primary schools. There are also a number of private schools.

Bracknell and Wokingham College is the main further and adult education provider for the borough, just outside the borough its headquarters is in Bracknell. The Borough's closest higher education provider is the main Whiteknights Park campus of the University of Reading immediately north-west, most of which falls within the Wokingham Borough boundary.

== Home ownership ==
The borough has the highest proportion of home ownership of the six local authorities in Berkshire: combining the social (housing association and local authority provided) and private (private landlord) rented sectors, Slough's returns recorded in 2011 that its rented sector comprised 46% of its housing, whereas 18% of Wokingham's residents rented their homes.

Excluding lower-tier districts, Central Government has classified Wokingham as the least needy Local Authority. Government funding is about £120 per head per year. This is the lowest among the combined category of county councils and unitary authorities, the basis on which it is overall assessed, and compares with over £1000 per head in others such as the London Borough of Hackney.

Tenure in Berkshire compared
Unitary Authority	Owned	Owned with a loan	Socially rented	Privately rented	Other
Wokingham	36%	45%	7%	11%	1%
Bracknell Forest	25%	44%	17%	13%	1%
Reading	23%	33%	17%	27%	1%
Slough	19%	34%	21%	25%	1%
West Berkshire	32%	39%	14%	14%	2%
Windsor and Maidenhead	33%	36%	13%	16%	2%

== Freedom of the Borough ==
The following people and military units have received the Freedom of the Borough of Wokingham.

=== Individuals ===
- Stanley Leonard Bowyer: 30 January 1973.
- Leonard Goddard Smalley: 30 January 1973.

=== Military Units ===
- The Royal Electrical and Mechanical Engineers: 21 October 1978.
