= Bow Brook, Hampshire =

River in Hampshire, England

Bow Brook
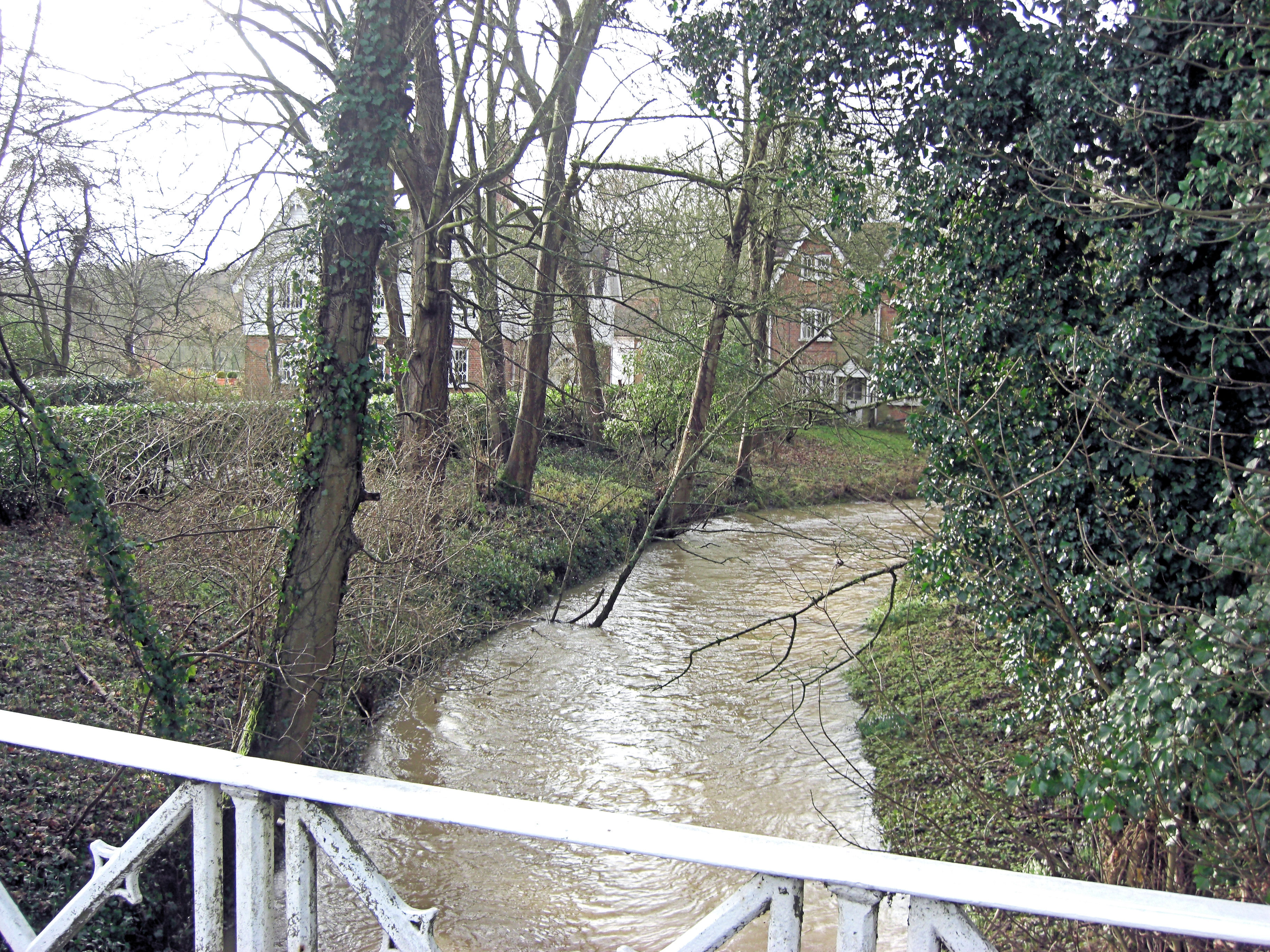
- Bow Brook looking upstream from the iron bridge dated 1831 at Beaurepaire Mill.

Location
- Country: England
- Counties: Hampshire

Physical characteristics
- Source
  - location: Ramsdell
  - coordinates: 51°18′31″N 1°09′39″W
- Mouth: River Loddon
  - location: Sherfield on Loddon
  - coordinates: 51°19′32″N 1°01′55″W

Basin features
- Tributaries
  - right: Vyne Brook

Bow Brook is a small river in the English county of Hampshire, which is a tributary of the River Loddon. Contributary streams rise near Ramsdell and Sherborne St John, and after flowing through rural countryside, it joins the Loddon near Sherfield on Loddon. Historically it has powered at least two watermills.

== Route ==
Bow Brook rises as a series of streams to the west of Pamber End. Sections are marked as drains, and so the channel may be engineered. One begins near West Heath, and passes under two roads to reach Clapperhill Copse. A second follows a similar course, but further to the south, passing under one road to join the first. They flow to the east, and along the northern edge of the site of Pamber Priory. A third stream begins at three ponds to the west of Ramsdell, and it joined by two more streams, before it passes beneath Brocas Bridge and another bridge to flow along the southern and eastern edges of the priory site. The priory was founded during the reign of Henry I by Henry de Port, and was an alien priory, under the supervision of St Vigor Carasy, Normandy. Because it was under foreign control, it was suppressed in 1446, and responsibility for the site eventually passed to The Queen's College, Oxford, to whom it still belongs. Parts of the priory church, dating from the 12th and 13th centuries, survive as the Priory Church of the Holy Trinity, Our Lady, and St John the Baptist. It is in the parish of Monk Sherborne, and is a grade I listed structure. The adjacent farm house and barn are grade II listed structures.

Another stream which rises in Monk Sherborne Wood flows northwards to join the main stream as it passes under the A340 Aldermaston Road. Beyond the bridge it passes through woodland, known as Pamderend Gully Copse and Pamderend Moor Gully Copse. A tributary which also rises in Monk Sherborne Wood joins from the south, and another which begins as a spring in Cranes Copse joins close to a ford where a track crosses the river. This was also the point at which a Roman road crossed the river. In Wiltshire's Gully Copse, a stream which is known as Old Ponds joins from the north. This begins as two branches near Pamber Green, which join to flow eastwards under a bridge at Little Loddon, and Boar's Bridge before turning to the south to join Bow Brook. This continues through woodland, and passes over a weir at Tumbling Bay, to reach Beaurepaire Mill. The square mill building was built in the 1870s or 1880s for the Beaurepaire estate, but has now been converted into a house. The rather larger mill house dates from the same time, although it was extended in the 20th century. The river continues beneath a bridge dated 1831, which consists of five elliptical cast-iron girders supporting plates on which the roadway is constructed. The balustrades are made of wrought iron, and the abutments are of brick and stone.

Shortly afterwards, the river is crossed by the course of another Roman road, and passes beneath Lock's Bridge to enter Bramley Training Area. This was the Bramley Ordnance Depot between 1917 and 1987, when it was used to store ammunition, and was also the home of the Royal Army Ordnance Corps School of Ammunition from 1922 to 1974. The channel splits into two, and joins up again after both routes have passed under the Great Western Railway line connecting Basingstoke and Reading, which bisects the training area. The depot had its own internal standard-gauge railway network, which crossed Bow Brook four times to the west of the main line railway, and another four times to the east. The Brook then curves around the southern edge of a mound on which the earthworks for Bulls Down Camp stand. This was an Iron Age hillfort, covering 10 acres (4 ha), which has never been excavated archaeologically, and is a scheduled monument. The river then passes along the north-western edge of Sherfield on Loddon, passes a sewage treatment works on its right bank, and joins the Loddon.

Vyne Stream is a tributary of Bow Brook, which rises from springs in the south-easterly part of Sherborne St John. It passes under Vyne Road, and forms a large pond, known as Mill Head. Wey Brook, which rises from springs on both sides of the A340 road to the north-west of Sherborne St John, supplies water to watercress beds and flows eastwards to join Mill Head. Its outflow powered a watermill, beyond which the river turns to the north and passes a sewage treatment works on the right bank. It then enters The Vyne, a large area of parkland which was recorded as having a manor house and chapel in 1362. It was inherited by William Sandys in 1496, who became the Lord Chamberlain to Henry VIII in 1523. Much of the park became part of the estate at around that time. John Chute inherited the estate in 1754, and was probably responsible for enlarging the lake. When the owner Charles Chaloner died in 1956, the estate, which consists of 10 hectares (25 acres) of gardens, 35 hectares (86 acres) of parkland and 55 hectares (140 acres) of woodland, was given to the National Trust. At its southern end, the lake is crossed by a three-arched bridge, constructed from red bricks with cast iron parapets in 1840. At the bottom end of the lake is a weir with a small lake beyond, and the Vyne Stream heads northwards, passing under Morgaston Road, to reach the mill pond at Beaurepaire Mill.

== Milling ==
Bow Brook and its tributaries have been used to provide power for milling since at least the time of the Domesday Book in 1086. The Manor of Sherborne St John was owned by Hugh de Port at that time, and contained three mills worth 27 shillings and sixpence (£1.37). One of them, probably that located where Beaurepaire Mill stands, was given to Bartholomew Pecche by William de St. John, and was subsequently given to Monk Sherborne Priory by Henry de Port, when he founded it in 1130. The priory received a mark of silver each year from the mill, as well as having all of their corn ground at no charge, but de Port's grandson Adam obtained the mill again, by exchanging it for all the tithes from his mills in Sherborne. In 1302, two mills and a fishpond were mentioned in Sherborne St John, one of which was at the site of the present mill building, next to the Mill Head fishpond, while the second was probably on the Wey Brook to the north of the village, where there is evidence of a mill pool. The Beaurepaire Mill appears on an estate plan dating from 1613 in its present location. Both Beaurepaire Mill, now a Grade II listed building, and Sherborne St John Mill were marked as corn mills in 1872-73 and again in 1911, though the former was converted to domestic accommodation in the 1870s.

== Water quality ==
The Environment Agency measure water quality of the river systems in England. Each is given an overall ecological status, which may be one of five levels: high, good, moderate, poor and bad. There are several components that are used to determine this, including biological status, which looks at the quantity and varieties of invertebrates, angiosperms and fish. Chemical status, which compares the concentrations of various chemicals against known safe concentrations, is rated good or fail.

The water quality of the Bow Brook system was as follows in 2019.

Section	Ecological Status	Chemical Status	Overall Status	Length	Catchment	Channel
Bow Brook (Pamber End to Bramley)	Poor	Fail	Poor	9.0 miles (14.5 km)	6.97 square miles (18.1 km^{2})	
Vyne Stream	Moderate	Fail	Moderate	4.6 miles (7.4 km)	4.88 square miles (12.6 km^{2})	heavily modified
Bow Brook (Bramley to Sherfield Green)	Moderate	Fail	Moderate	3.4 miles (5.5 km)	3.75 square miles (9.7 km^{2})	

Reasons for the water quality being less than good include the discharge of sewage effluent, physical barriers to the movement of fish caused by modifications to the channel for land drainage and milling, and runoff of water from agricultural land. In addition, Vyne Stream is affected by groundwater abstraction, the impounding of water, and the presence of the invasive North American signal crayfish.

== Bibliography ==
- Page, William, ed. (1911). "Parishes: Sherborne St. John". A History of the County of Hampshire. Vol. 4. British History Online.
