= Loddon Bridge =

Loddon Bridge refers to several bridges over the River Loddon in Berkshire, England:

- The bridge carrying the A3290 road is the subject of the Loddon Bridge disaster, a collapse of falsework during construction in Reading, Berkshire, in 1972
- The bridge carrying the A4 road west of Twyford, Berkshire
- The bridge carrying the M4 motorway west of Sindlesham, Berkshire
