= Loddon =

Loddon may refer to:

== Places ==
- Loddon, Norfolk in England, UK
- Shire of Loddon, a local government area in Victoria, Australia (since 1995)
  - Bridgewater On Loddon, Victoria, a town in Victoria, Australia

== Rivers ==
- River Loddon, a tributary of the River Thames in Hampshire and Berkshire, England, UK
- Loddon River, Victoria, Australia
- Loddon River (Tasmania), a river in Tasmania, Australia

== See also ==
- Loddon Nature Reserve, near Twyford, Berkshire, England
- London, England
- Shire of East Loddon, an historic local government area in Victoria, Australia (1864-1995)
