= Lodge Wood and Sandford Mill =

Wet woodlands in Berkshire, England

- Site of Special Scientific Interest
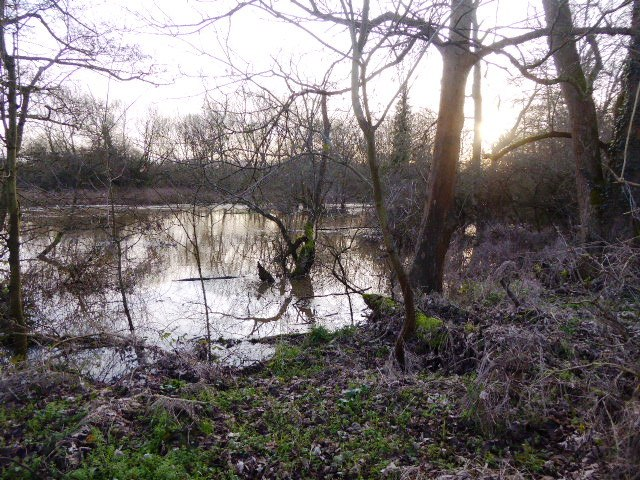
- Sandford Mill Wood flooded
- Location of Lodge Wood and Sandford Mill.
- Area of search: Berkshire
- Grid reference: SU 782 733
- Coordinates: 51.453°N 0.876°W
- Interest: Biological
- Area: 2.3 hectares (5.7 acres)
- Notification date: 1985
- Location map: Magic Map

Lodge Wood and Sandford Mill is a 2.3-hectare (5.7-acre) biological Site of Special Scientific Interest east of Woodley in Berkshire.

This site consists of two small wet woodlands bordering the River Loddon.

== History ==
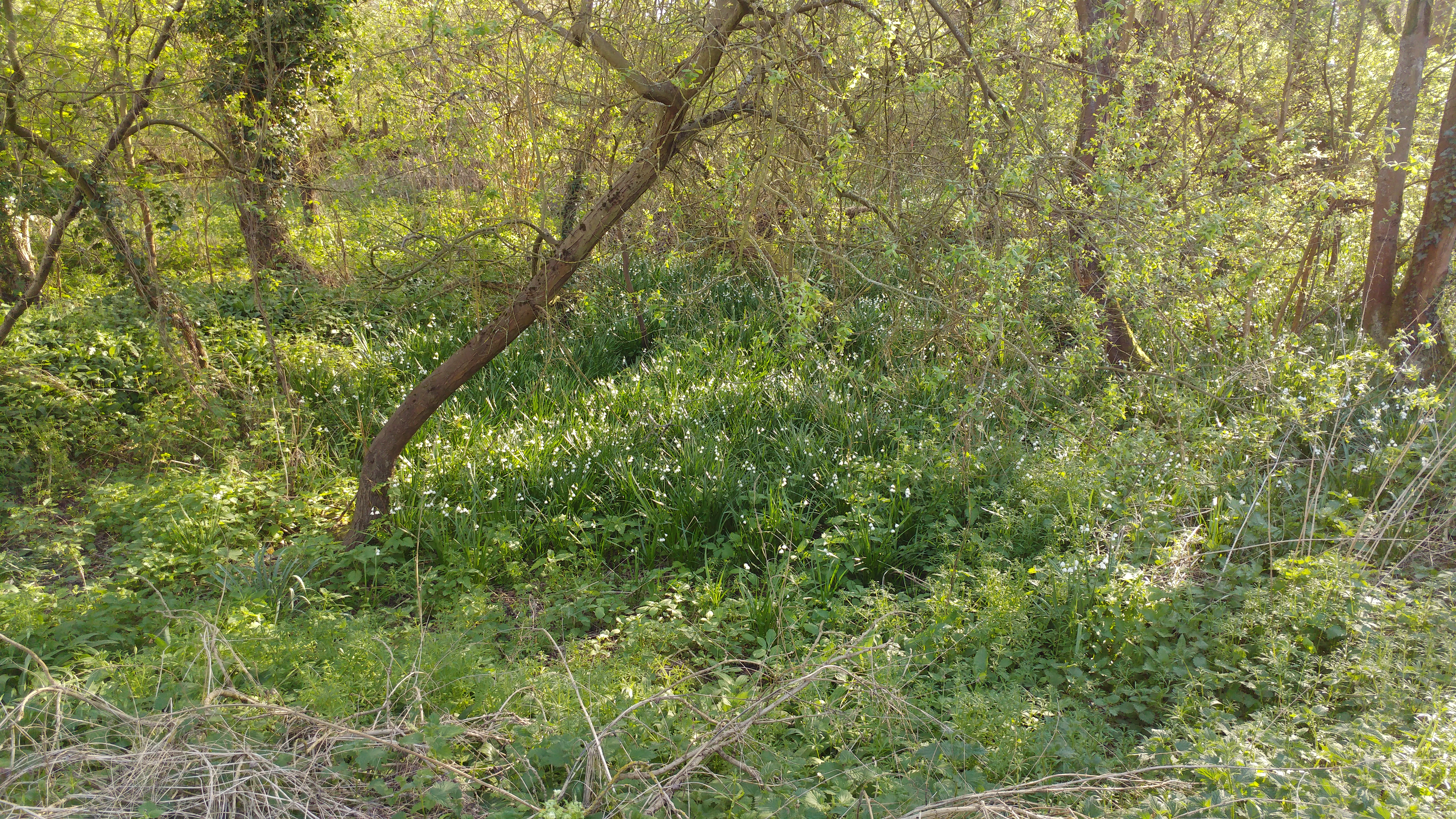
Loddon Lily at Sandford Mill - April 2017

Lodge Wood is first shown on John Rocque's map of Berkshire in 1761. In 1953 part of the site was included in the Loddon Valley SSSI.

== Flora ==
The site has the following Flora:

=== Trees ===
- Cornus
- Fraxinus
- Sambucus
- Quercus robur
- Hazel
- Alder
- Salix fragilis
- Prunus spinosa
- Ribes sylvestre
- Crataegus
- Euonymus

=== Plants ===
- Leucojum aestivum (the Loddon Lily)
- Urtica dioica
- Galium aparine
- Glechoma hederacea
- Primula vulgaris
- Anemone nemorosa
- Mercurialis perennis
- Ranunculus ficaria
- Caltha palustris
- Adoxa moschatellina
- Hyacinthoides non-scripta
- Narcissus pseudonarcissus
