= Twyford Brook =

River in Berkshire, England

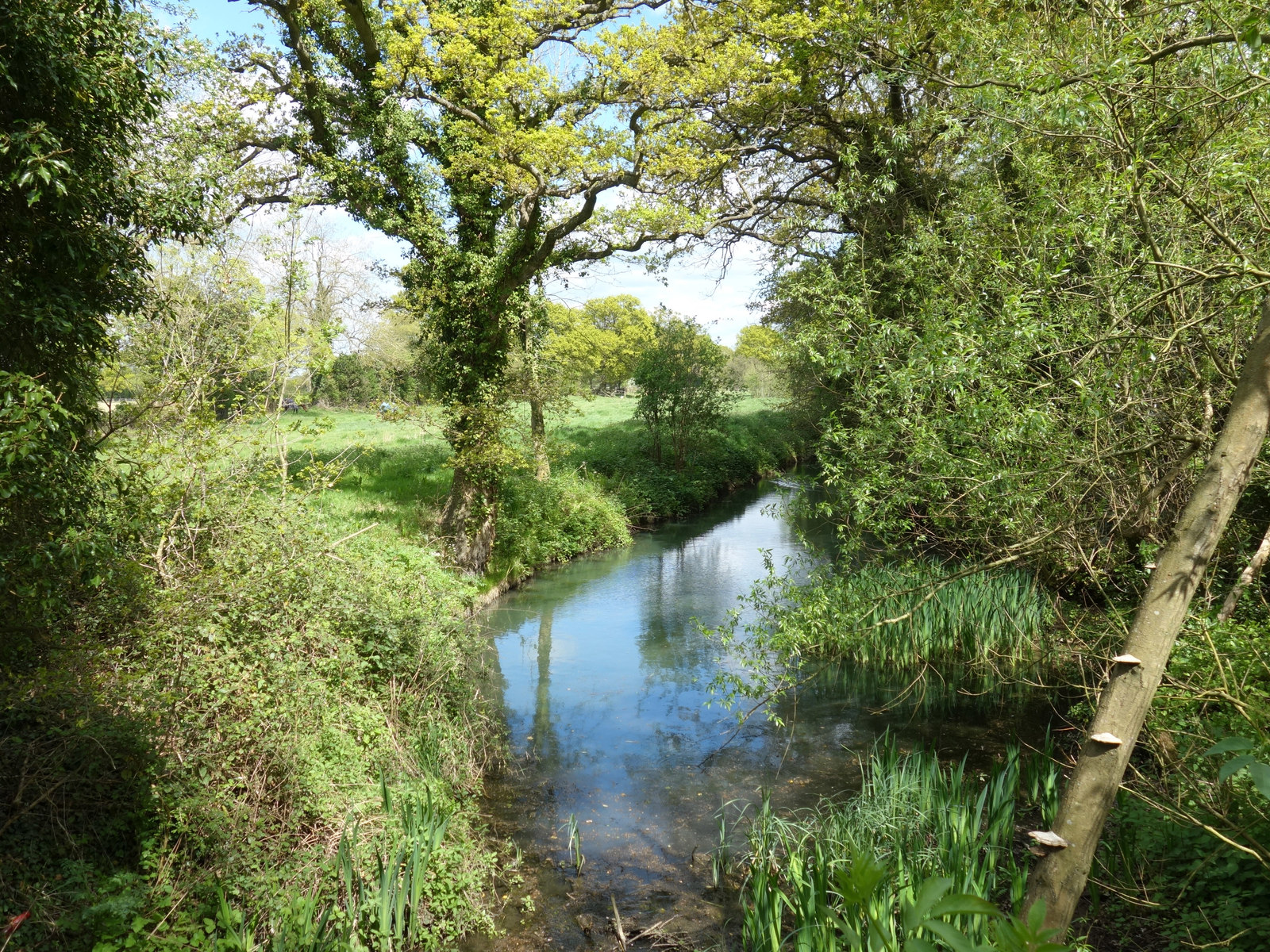
- Twyford Brook, looking upstream from Callin's Bridge

Location
- Country: England
- Counties: Berkshire
- Towns: Twyford

Physical characteristics
- Source
  - location: White Waltham
  - coordinates: 51°28′14″N 0°46′20″W
- Mouth: River Loddon
  - location: Twyford
  - coordinates: 51°28′40″N 0°52′15″W

Twyford Brook is a small English river in the county of Berkshire. It drains a rural area to the east of Twyford, starting at the foot of the M4 motorway embankment, and is a tributary of the River Loddon. It was once part of a larger river system, draining the area now occupied by the new town of Bracknell. Because of issues with flooding, a new channel was cut to carry the water to the River Thames at Bray. The new channel and the river upstream from there is now known as The Cut, and the old channel became known as Twyford Brook.

== Route ==
The river begins at the foot of the M4 motorway embankment near Pondwood Fisheries. Formerly, The Cut, which now makes a sharp turn on the other side of the embankment, flowed to the west along what is now the Twyford Brook. However, further downstream there was an area of low-lying land on Ruscombe Common, known as Ruscombe Lake, because it was always flooded, as there was no proper outlet to allow the water to reach the River Loddon. In order to rectify this, a new cut was created to carry the water to the River Thames at Bray. Further east, the river was as some time known as How Brook, although in 1813, prior to the construction of The Cut, the whole river appears to have been known as the Broadwater, and the river to the west of Ruscombe Lake was still known as the River Broadwater in 1923, rather than Twyford Brook. The construction of the cut and the draining of Ruscombe Lake took place around 1820. There was an area of swampy ground between the sharp turn and the Twyford Brook, but the connection was severed by the construction of the motorway embankment.

The start of the river is now known as Snake Water, and forms part of Pondwood Fisheries. In 1986, the present owner bought the seven plots of land at Pondwood which had been created when the motorway was built in the 1970s, and opened a fishery using two lakes to the north of the river in 1987. The course of the river here was known as West End Ditch, and maintenance by Thames Water ceased in the late 1980s. Faced with large volumes of run-off water from the motorway flooding the area, in the early 1990s the owner widened the stream to create a series of lakes, and built weirs to control the flow of flood water. These made a valuable addition to the fishery, and a fourth lake was created in 2008, which was excavated in swampy ground that had previously been used as a training ground for the Badminton horse trials.

To the west of the fishery, the river passes under Smewins Road. Just to the north is Smewins Farm, where the grade II listed Smewins Cottage, probably dating from Tudor times, sits in the middle of a large moat. The moat is filled with water and its ditches are about 16 feet (5 m) wide and 5 feet (1.5 m) deep. The site is a scheduled monument, around 66 yards (60 m) from east to west and between 44 and 55 yards (40 and 50 m) from north to south. The moat is open at the eastern end, and although there are about 6,000 moated sites in England, few are known to exist in Berkshire, and so the site is particularly important.

The river heads generally westwards, meandering across land which is just below the 130-foot (40 m) contour for most of its length. Occasional drains join it from time to time, and just before it reaches Callin's Bridge, it is joined by a drain that collects water from Beenham's Heath, and after crossing the heath, from a drain that runs along the foot of the motorway embankment. The course then meanders to the north to pass under Crockford's Bridge, and then to the east to reach Sill Bridge. This is an early 18th century humpback bridge with three semi-circular arches and is grade II listed. Next, it makes a larger deviation to the north, where it is crossed by three tracks, Mire Lane, another unnamed track and Garthing Lane at Garthinglane Bridge. It runs around the northern and western edge of a large tract of land called Ruscombe Lake, the area that used to flood and caused The Cut to be built. The lake was famous for fishing, prior to it being drained around 1820, but claims that it formerly covered an area of 3,000 acres (12 km^{2}) appear to be exaggerated, in view of the geography, and 100 acres (0.40 km^{2}) seems more likely. It was somewhat seasonal in nature, expanding to its maximum size in winter, and drying out to a large extent in summer. As it makes a horseshoe turn to run along the northern edge of Stanlake Park, the river is joined by another drain which carries water from an extensive area to the south and east. Nearby is another moat, this time completely enclosing an area, in the centre of which is a fishpond, believed to be contemporary with the moat. The pond retains water all year, but the moat is only filled with water seasonally. It is at the western end of Botany Bay copse.

Stanlake Park is a large country house dating from the 16th century, to which alterations were made in the 18th and subsequent centuries. It is grade II listed, as is the adjacent stable block, which was converted from a 16th-century timber-framed barn in the 18th century. Its east front includes a clock dating from 1681. To the west of the house, the river passes under the B3018 road at Stanlake Bridge, and then curves around the edge of modern housing that forms part of Twyford. Two more drains join from the south before it passes under the A321 Hurst Road, and turns to the north, to run parallel to the River Loddon as it crosses the 115-foot (35 m) contour. It is crossed by the Great Western Main Line railway just to the west of Twyford railway station, and the branch line from Twyford for Henley-on-Thames crosses it twice. There are two culverts on the final section, which have allowed housing on Weavers Way to be built over it, and then it enters the Loddon just below the site of Twyford flour mill.

There have been mills at Twyford since at least 1365, and a silk mill was built in 1810 by two brothers, Thomas and George Billing. The enterprise was fairly short-lived, as the law was changed to allow silk to be imported more freely from France, and only mills equipped with up-to-date equipment could compete. Thomas died in 1824, and the mill was sold to become a flour mill soon afterwards. The mill building spanned both Twyford Brook and the River Loddon, with the Brook joining the tailrace of the mill on the downstream side of the building. By 1899 it was served by a long railway siding which ran alongside the Henley branchline from Twyford station. The wooden building was burnt down in a fire in 1891, but a new mill was built, which was bought by Berks, Bucks and Oxon Farmers Ltd in 1927, a group of farmers who operated as a co-operative to mill animal feed. The mill was powered by water wheels and diesel engines until the early 1960s, when it was converted to use electric motors. By 1969 the railway siding had been lifted, and a distribution warehouse covering 20,000 square feet (1,900 m^{2}) was added, but another fire destroyed the building in 1976, and construction of a new mill was completed in 1979. The new building was much larger than the old, and a section of Twyford Brook was culverted, to allow the buildings to extend onto a piece of land between the brook and the Loddon which had formerly been marsh. The owners became bankrupt in the 1990s, and the site was redeveloped for housing. Although none of it is original, much of the building has four storeys, as did the pre-1976 building, and incorporates cosmetic features to suggest the previous use of the site.

== Water quality ==
The Environment Agency measure water quality of the river systems in England. Each is given an overall ecological status, which may be one of five levels: high, good, moderate, poor and bad. There are several components that are used to determine this, including biological status, which looks at the quantity and varieties of invertebrates, angiosperms and fish. Chemical status, which compares the concentrations of various chemicals against known safe concentrations, is rated good or fail.

The water quality of Twyford Brook was as follows in 2019.

Section	Ecological Status	Chemical Status	Overall Status	Length	Catchment
Twyford Brook	Bad	Fail	Bad	6.8 miles (10.9 km)	15.92 square miles (41.2 km^{2})

The water quality has fluctuated. The chemical status was Fail in 2013 and 2014, but Good in 2015 and 2016. The ecological status and overall status was Poor in 2013, moderate in 2014, and bad in 2015 and 2016. Reasons for the status not being good include sewage discharge, run-off from the M4 motorway, and contamination by fertilisers leeching into the river from agricultural land.

== Bibliography ==
- Bowes, Michael J; et al. (1 September 2018). "Weekly water quality monitoring data for the River Thames" (PDF). Centre for Ecology and Hydrology. Archived (PDF) from the original on 28 April 2019.
- Ditchfield, P H; Page, William, eds. (1923). "Parishes: Ruscombe". A History of the County of Berkshire. Vol. 3. British History Online.
- Eighteen, Brian (2000). "Watermills on the River Loddon". Wargrave Local History Society. Archived from the original on 14 January 2017.
- Farrar, Henry; et al. (2005). "Ruscombe (rothescamp)". The CD-Rom of Hurst. Archived from the original on 26 March 2016.
- Fitch, John (1989). Twyford and Ruscombe Village Walks. Twyford and Ruscombe Local History Society. ISBN 0-948245-05-0.
- Ford, David Nash (2020). East Berkshire Town and Village Histories. Nash Ford Publishing. Archived from the original on 15 May 2020.
- Holdaway, Mick (2020). "Pondwood Fishery - History". Pondwood Fisheries. Archived from the original on 16 June 2020.
- Mavor, William (1813). General View of the Agriculture of Berkshire. Sherwood, Neely and Jones.
- Monckton, H W (1911). Cambridge County Geographies - Berkshire. Cambridge University Press.
