= Ramsdell =

Village and parish in Hampshire, England

Coordinates: 51.313613°N 1.162038°W

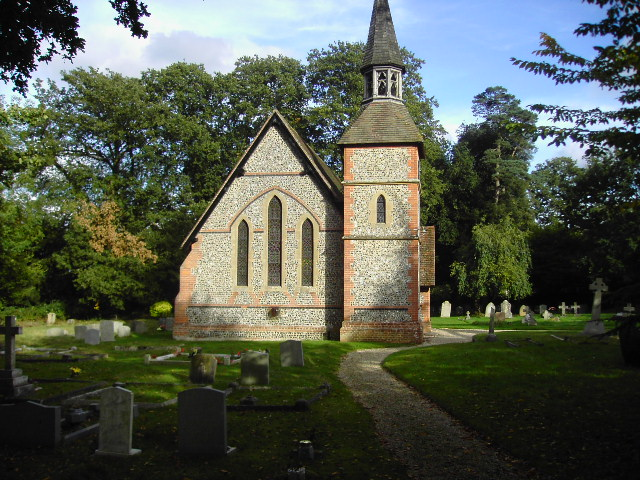
- Parish Church

- Location within Hampshire
- Population: 75 (approx)
- OS grid reference: SU585575
- Civil parish: Wootton St Lawrence with Ramsdell
- District: Basingstoke and Deane
- Shire county: Hampshire
- Region: South East
- Country: England
- Sovereign state: United Kingdom
- Post town: Tadley
- Postcode district: RG26
- Dialling code: 01256
- Police: Hampshire and Isle of Wight
- Fire: Hampshire and Isle of Wight
- Ambulance: South Central
- UK Parliament: North West Hampshire

Ramsdell is a small village in the civil parish of Wootton St Lawrence with Ramsdell, in the Basingstoke and Deane district, in the English county of Hampshire. Ramsdell neighbours with Charter Alley only 1/2 mile up the road. The town of Tadley is 5 miles (8.0 km) away with the nearest shops. Ramsdell lies near other towns the largest being Basingstoke (7 miles) with Newbury only 15 miles (24 km) in the other direction. Other nearby villages include West Heath, Stoney Heath, Baughurst, Monk Sherborne, and Wootton St Lawrence.

== Village life ==
Ramsdell is a typical English village with the church traditionally being the main focal point and also with a cricket ground, village hall and a community tennis court located by the cricket ground along with a children's play park. The focal point of the village is the cross roads right in the centre where Basingstoke Road meets Ewhurst Lane and Monk Sherborne road. Christ Church is located on one of the corners with the village hall nearby.

Events in Ramsdell include weekly cricket matches in the summer months, a bi-annual Fete and an annual village tennis tournament. There is also a monthly ladies' club meeting in the village hall. The local pub is called the White Hart.

== Transport ==
Ramsdell is located 1-mile (1.6 km) from the A339 which links Basingstoke to Newbury. From Basingstoke the M3 links to London and Southampton. A bus service operates in term time to the Clere school and St. Gabriel's School both in Newbury. Basingstoke station is the nearest main railway station linking to London and the south coast but Bramley station only 3 miles (4.8 km) away links to Reading. The nearest international airports are Southampton (27 miles (43 km)) and London Heathrow (31 miles (50 km))
