= River Lyde (Hampshire) =

River in Hampshire, England

Lyde
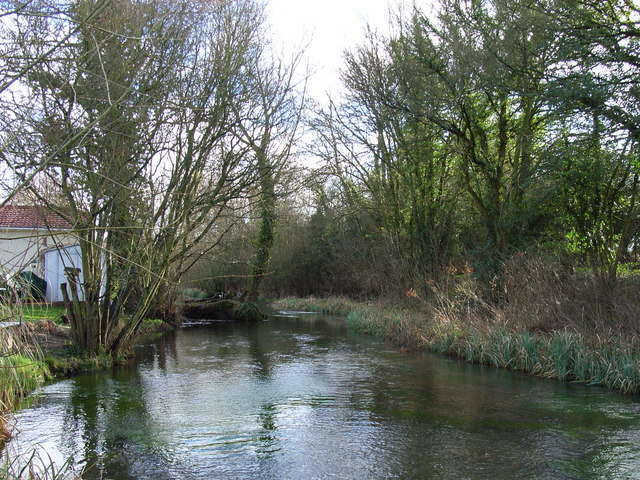
- The Lyde River, looking downstream from the A30 Bridge at Water End

Location
- Country: England
- Counties: Hampshire

Physical characteristics
- Source
  - location: Mapledurwell
  - coordinates: 51°15′21″N 1°02′32″W
- Mouth: River Loddon
  - location: Sherfield on Loddon
  - coordinates: 51°18′46″N 1°00′31″W
- Length: 6.2 mi (10.0 km)

The River Lyde or Lyde River is a small river in the English county of Hampshire. It rises near Mapledurwell, where the water is used in watercress beds before entering the main channel. It flows in a generally northerly direction, and used to supply power to watermills along its route. Near Sherfield on Loddon it joins the River Loddon, which is a tributary of the River Thames.

== Route ==
The Lyde River rises as a series of springs on the chalk aquifer to the west of Mapledurwell. Almost immediately, it runs through a number of watercress beds, which are part of Huish Farm. The main house was built in 1909 for the Westray family, in Domestic Revival style, with a red brick ground floor, timber framing on the first floor, and an attic above that. Most of the internal features are in original condition. It is a grade II listed structure, as are the associated barn and granary. To the north of the farm, the river is crossed by the M3 motorway, but the bridge marks the location where the Basingstoke Canal once crossed, on its way to Basingstoke. The canal was never a commercial success, and the last boats to use this section did so in 1914. The section further east continued to be used until 1949, but when restoration began in the 1970s, progress was hampered by the partial collapse of the Greywall Tunnel, and the fact that the largest population of bats in Europe use it for hibernation in the winter. The construction of the M3 motorway sealed the fate of the western section.

Beyond the motorway, there are a network of drains and springs, which swell the flow, before it turns to the east to reach Priory Farm at Andwell. This was the site of St Mary's Priory from around 1130 until 1391, when it was dissolved. It was an alien priory, under the control of the Tironensian Order in France. Parts of the priory have been incorporated into Priory Farmhouse, a grade I listed building, which was altered and extended in the 17th and 19th centuries. The adjacent barn, stable and cartshed are also listed structures. The river passes around the southern edge of the site, and is joined by another stream, which rises by the grade II* listed church of St Mary, Mapledurwell, which dates from the 13th and 15th centuries, with 19th century restorations. The spring is at 242 feet (74 m) above Ordnance datum, from which the stream weaves its way northwards, on both sides of Frog Lane, and there are more watercress beds, either side of the former course of the canal, before it passes under Greywell Road and the motorway to reach the main waterway.

The river then resumes its northward course, and there are a number of sluices and weirs, which were part of Andwell Mill. The mill building has survived, a massive structure dating from the 17th century, but heavily modernised around 1900. Andwell Mill Trout Farm now operated a little further downstream. It produces smoked trout, some from locally-grown fish and some from imported fish. The business began in 1979, and in 1993 won a planning appeal to allow them to extend, which had been declined because so much of the fish was imported. However, the amount of locally sourced fish that could be produced was restricted by the volume of water that their abstraction licence allowed them to take from the river. The name Andwell is derived from two words both meaning "well". "An" is from the Celtic language and "well" from Saxon. At Water End the river is crossed by the A30 road, passes a large mobile home park, and then is crossed by the South West Main Line railway. Just before a bridge carrying Newnham Lane is the site of Lyde Mill. The mill house dates from the 17th and late 18th centuries, with some modern extensions. The river then meanders across open countryside, passing very close to the Loddon, and then moving away to reach the early 19th century Hartley Mill. The mill itself had two storeys and an attic, with an attached two-storey mill house. Both parts have been adapted to form a single house, and although the water wheel has gone, a number of iron wheels from the original machinery have been retained as decoration. Shortly after the mill, the river joins the Loddon.

== Milling ==
There is clear evidence of three water mills on the river, all of which were corn mills in 1873, but during the 17th century there were five operational mills powered by the Lyde. The present Andwell Mill building dates from the 17th century, it is Grade II listed. Lyde Mill, another Grade II listed building, also dates from the 17th century, although there is evidence for milling at Lyde from 1086. It is located in the parish of Newnham, which was part of the parish of Mapledurwell until 1178, and so did not appear in the Domesday Book. Mapledurwell was noted as having two mills at that time, one of which was probably at the site of Lyde Mill. Newnham has had two corn mills and a paper mill at various points in its history, as well as a foundry and two brickworks. It is unclear where the two mills were, as the eastern boundary of Newnham was once on the River Whitewater, which powered Hook corn mill, and so the two may have been one on each river. The village church was served by monks from West Sherborne Priory, and this was facilitated by Henry de Port, who gave money to the priory. A charter that he made in 1130 in this context mentions tithes from two mills in the parish, while in 1766, David Crimble of Lyde Mill was responsible for the upkeep of two panels of the churchyard fence. At the same time, Edward Chamberlain of Paper Mill was responsible for a further four panels, but this was the paper mill on the Whitewater at Wolson Bridge, now the Crooked Billet Bridge on the A30 road. Hartley Mill building dates from the 19th century and is a Grade II listed building.

== Ecology ==
The Lyde is a classic chalk stream, with clear water and an abundance of aquatic plants, including water-crowfoot, water starwort and water moss. In 2009 the water quality was rated class A, in the system used at the time, and the aquifer from which the water came was protected against further abstraction of groundwater. The river is populated by a number of fish species that form part of the Biodiversity action plan for the area, including wild brown trout, European bullhead and brook lamprey. It used to have a good population of white-clawed crayfish but this native breed has now been largely replaced by the invasive North American signal crayfish.

In 2009, the Wild Trout Trust carried out a survey of the 0.6-mile (1 km) section from the railway bridge downstream to near Lyde Mill, on behalf of the riparian owners who live at Manor Farm. They found that the channel near the mill appears to have been diverted, and the banks raised to increase the head of water for the mill. When this occurred is not known, since there has been a mill in this vicinity since 1086. The river has also been affected by post-war efforts to increase agricultural output, which resulted in drainage works and the dredging of the channel. This has resulted in the channel being larger than would be expected for the size of river, and of uniform shape, without the changes in water velocity that a more natural course normally creates. This results in the water moving slowly, with sediments smothering the bed and marginal plants such as bur reed and reed sweet-grass growing right across the channel.

For trout to thrive, they need a variety of habitats, and there was only one 22-yard (20 m) section near the railway that was suitable for spawning. However, there were long sections above the railway where there were shallow riffles, with the water flowing over loose gravel and low scrub covering shallow margins, which is ideal for spawning and as habitat for juvenile trout. The report concluded that the river could be significantly improved for trout if the hatches at Lyde Mill could be altered to lower the surface water level a little, and thus increase the water velocity. Creating areas of dappled shade by some felling of trees, particularly where they form dense cover of the river would also be beneficial, and the felled wood could be used as large woody debris, to narrow the channel and scour sediments from the bed. Large woody debris has been shown to significantly increase the range of habitats within a river.

== Water Quality ==
The Environment Agency measure water quality of the river systems in England. Each is given an overall ecological status, which may be one of five levels: high, good, moderate, poor and bad. There are several components that are used to determine this, including biological status, which looks at the quantity and varieties of invertebrates, angiosperms and fish. Chemical status, which compares the concentrations of various chemicals against known safe concentrations, is rated good or fail.

The water quality of the Lyde River was as follows in 2019.

Section	Ecological Status	Chemical Status	Overall Status	Length	Catchment
Lyde	Poor	Fail	Poor	6.2 miles (10.0 km)	12.27 square miles (31.8 km^{2})

Reasons for the water quality being less than good are all to do with physical modification of the channel, particularly for land drainage and milling, which prevents free movement of fish along the river. The water quality was Good from 2009 to 2013, as the biological elements measured populations of invertebrates, but not fish. It has been poor since 2014, as fish migration was included in the biological elements from that date, and the barriers to movement of fish are severe.

== Bibliography ==
- Bell, Nigel (June 2004). "Newnham - a history of its parish and its church" (PDF). www.northhampshirechurches.org.uk. Archived (PDF) from the original on 2 July 2020.
- Cumberlidge, Jane (2009). Inland Waterways of Great Britain (8th Ed.). Imray Laurie Norie and Wilson. ISBN 978-1-84623-010-3.
- Rosson, P (1993). "Planning review" (PDF). Planning Inspectorate. Archived (PDF) from the original on 30 June 2020.
- Shore, T W (1890). "Springs and Streams of Hampshire" (PDF). Proceedings. Hampshire Field Club & Archaeological Society. Archived (PDF) from the original on 2 July 2020.
- Shorter, A H (1953). "Paper-Mills in Hampshire" (PDF). Proceedings Vol 18 Part 1. Hampshire Field Club & Archaeological Society. Archived (PDF) from the original on 2 July 2020.
- Thomas, Andy (July 2009). "River Lyde – Manor Farm" (PDF). Wild Trout Trust. Archived (PDF) from the original on 30 June 2020.
