= Stephen Bragg =

British engineer

Stephen Lawrence Bragg
- Born: 17 November 1923
- Died: 14 November 2014 (aged 90)
- Education: University of Cambridge
- Occupations: engineer, academic
- Employers: Rolls-Royce; Brunel University
- Known for: Bragg-Hawthorne equation
- Spouse: Maureen Roberts
- Parent(s): Alice Bragg, Lawrence Bragg

Stephen Lawrence Bragg (17 November 1923 – 14 November 2014) was a British engineer who was Vice Chancellor of Brunel University from 1971 to 1981. He was the son of Lawrence Bragg and grandson of William Henry Bragg.

== Early life, education and career ==
He was born on 17 November 1923 to Lawrence Bragg, physicist, X-ray crystallographer and Nobel Prize winner for physics (1915) and his wife Alice Grace Jenny née Hopkinson. He attended Rugby School.

He studied engineering at the University of Cambridge graduating with an BA in 1945 and an MA in 1949. He went on to study at the Massachusetts Institute of Technology receiving an SM in 1949. He worked for Rolls-Royce between 1951 and 1971, helping develop the Blue Streak missile, and rose to the position of chief scientist, responsible for liaison with universities.

Bragg encouraged interactions between academia and industry, and spent five years on the University Grants Committee. In 1971 he left Rolls-Royce, three days before it was declared insolvent, and became Vice Chancellor of Brunel University. In 1981 he returned to Cambridge as director of the Industrial Cooperation Unit and Fellow of Wolfson College.

Bragg was the Chairman of the Advisory Committee on Falsework that published its Final Report of the Advisory Committee on Falsework in June 1975.

== Personal life ==
In 1951 he married Maureen Ann (née Roberts) and they had three sons.
