= Eastrop Park =

Public park in the east of Basingstoke, England

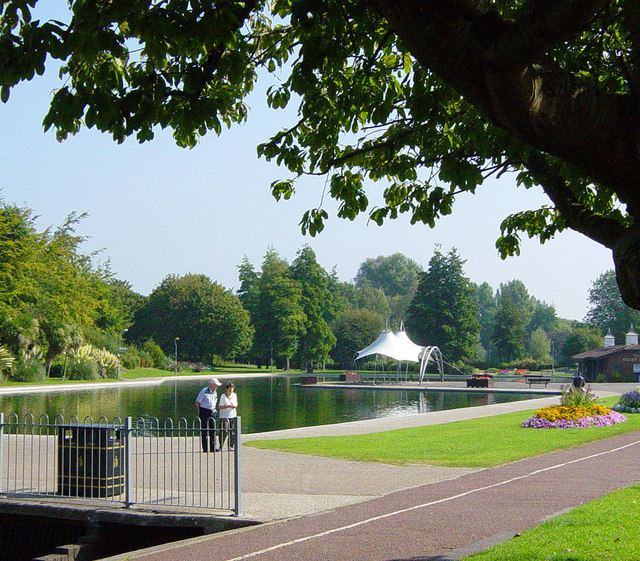
- Eastrop Park

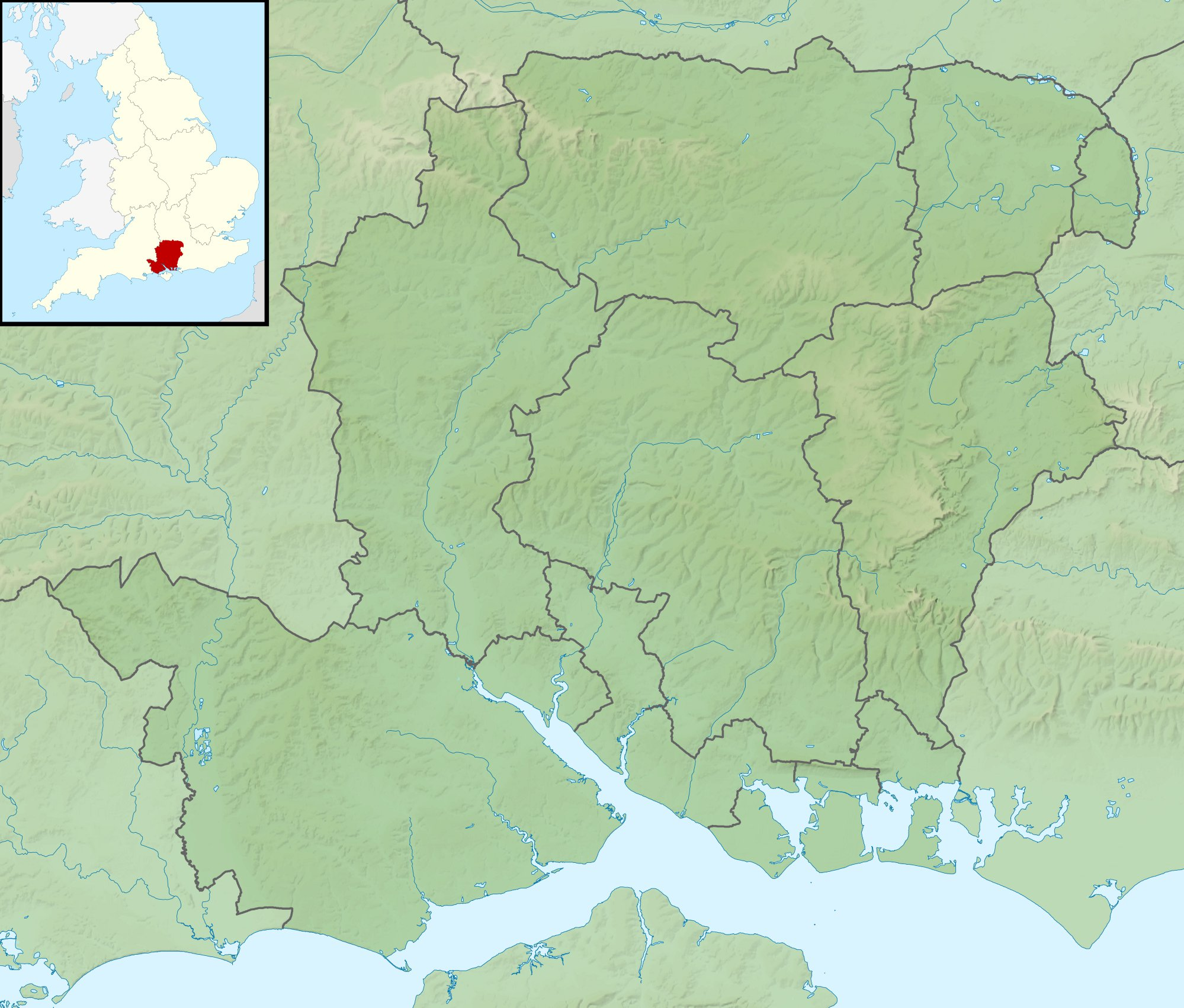
- Location within Hampshire
- Type: Public park
- Location: Basingstoke, Hampshire
- Coordinates: 51°16′01″N 1°04′30″W
- Created: 1972
- Status: All year

Eastrop Park is a public park located in the east of Basingstoke, Hampshire. The park features a large boating lake, a miniature golf course, a café and walking trails. The River Loddon flows through the park, feeding into a balancing pond. The pond serves as a habitat for various wildlife, including kingfishers.

== History ==
The park was opened in 1972. The name Eastrop derives from the Saxon name, meaning 'Eastern Settlement'.

Basingstoke Corn Mill, also known as Penton's Mill, stood on the site in 1873. The modern boating lake is on the site of the former mill pond.
