= Barkham Brook =

River in Berkshire, England

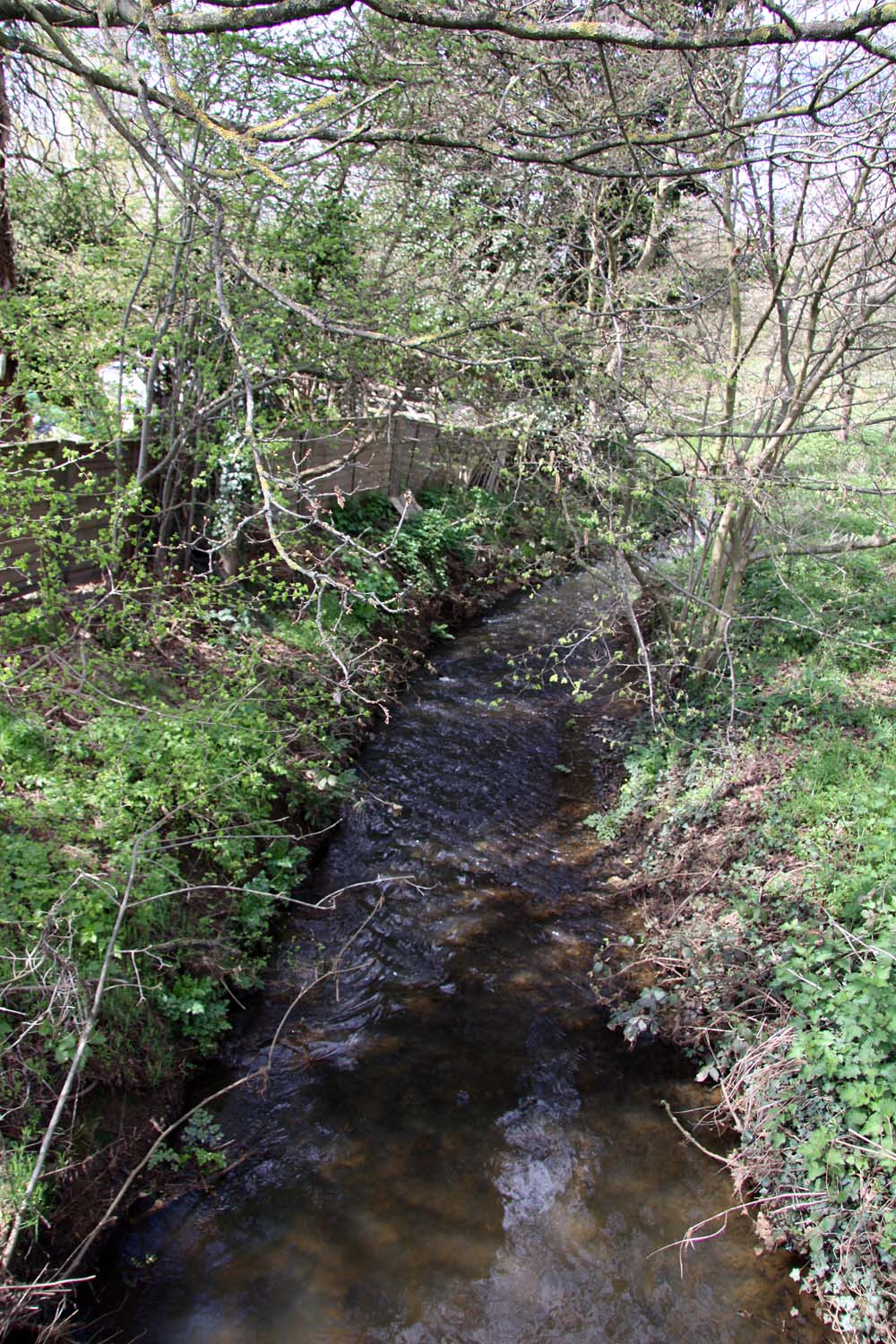
- Barkham Brook looking downstream from the B3030 road bridge at Barkham

Location
- Country: England
- Counties: Berkshire
- Districts / Boroughs: Wokingham Borough

Physical characteristics
- Source
  - location: Finchampstead
  - coordinates: 51.3884°N 0.8578°W
- Mouth: River Loddon
  - location: Winnersh
  - coordinates: 51.4256°N 0.8977°W

Barkham Brook is a small river in the English county of Berkshire. It has sources to the north and west of Finchampstead in the Wokingham Borough, flows past the village of Barkham, and joins the River Loddon to the west of Winnersh.

== Route ==
Barkham Brook begins as a series of drains on The Moors, an area of woodland to the north of Finchampstead close to Sand Martins Golf Course. It is augmented by other drains before it passes under Nash Grove Lane, and heads in a westerly direction, where it is joined on its left bank by another stream, fed by a network of drains to the west of Finchampstead. As it approaches Barkham, it passes to the north of a moated site and enclosure. The irregular-shaped moat is between 16 and 23 feet (5 and 7 m) wide, and is around 160 feet (50 m) by 245 feet (75 m) in size. A raised field with ditch to the north-east of the moat is thought to be the farmyard of a manor, and the whole complex is a scheduled monument. Between the moated site and the brook is the grade II listed church of St. James, an Early English style building the nave of which was constructed in 1862 by John B. Clacy and Son, while the chancel and transepts were added 25 years later. It contains an effigy of a woman in a long flowing dress and linen headdress, made from oak in the 13th century. In Barkham, the brook flows under Barkham Street and is then joined by a tributary on its left bank, flowing northwards from California.

The tributary begins at Longmoor Lake, which covers 6 acres (2.4 ha) and is situated in California Country Park. It was created by John Walter III, who extended an original pond after he bought the land to expand his Bearwood Estate in 1873. The clay which was excavated to construct the lake was used to make bricks. In the 1930s, the area became the California-in-England holiday camp, with attractions including a speedway track, but became a designated Country Park in 1980. The outflow from Longmoor Lake flows through Longmoor Bog, a Site of Special Scientific Interest (SSSI) covering 35.5 acres (14.4 ha), notable because it is one of the few base-poor valley mires in Berkshire. It includes an area of wet heathland, where peat sits on top of an underlying layer of clay, resulting in a ferruginous swamp, characterised by rust-coloured iron bacteria. Around the waterlogged mire are carrs of alder, grey willow, downy birch and alder buckthorn, while the swamp is populated by purple moor grass and cross-leaved heath.

At the western edge of Longmoor Bog, the brook is crossed by Park Lane, and turns to the north along the perimeter of the former Arborfield Garrison, which closed in 2015 to be re-developed for housing. After passing under Biggs Lane, it enters another lake, and then crosses open countryside to join the main channel, the combined flow continuing northwards until it is crossed by the B3349 Barkham Road. It is joined by a stream flowing westwards from the lakes at Barkham Manor. The grade II listed manor house was built on a moated site in the 17th century, and was enlarged in the 18th and 19th centuries, after which it was altered in the 20th century. It was the home of John Walter, and Mary Ball, the mother of George Washington, was born there. The brook continues to the north-west, and its flow is augmented by the treated effluent from Arborfield Sewage Treatment Works. The works is authorised to discharge 4.75 Ml per day into the river, but on 29 September 2013 discharged untreated effluent, resulting in serious pollution and the death of fish, other fauna and vegetation. Thames Water were fined £150,000 for that particular incident, as part of a much larger fine for five other incidents elsewhere.

To the west of the works, the brook turns to the north, and passes under the B3030 Mole Road at Mole Bridge Farm, where there is a weir. Shortly afterwards, it is joined by the outflow from Bear Wood Lake, which is located in the grade II* listed parks and gardens belonging to Bearwood College. John Walter II bought the Bearwood Estate in the early 19th century, and employed J W Sanderson to build a classical villa. He also enlarged the lake to its present size of 49 acres (20 ha). Walter's son, John Walter III rebuilt the house between 1865 and 1874, employing Robert Kerr as the architect. In 1919 the building became the Merchant Seamen's Orphanage, and then a boarding school. The lake was created by constructing a compacted clay dam across the small stream than ran through the grounds. The catchment area for supplying the lake is very small, at only 0.55 square miles (1.42 km^{2}), encompassing the school grounds, a golf course, a large area of woodland and runoff from a small residential area. The lake was estimated to hold around 313.6 Ml, but this was increased to 327.2 Ml by raising the surface level by 6 inches (150 mm) in the 1990s. Historically, water from the lake powered a sawmill situated near the dam, which had ceased to operate by the 1960s. A pumping station is located on the crest of the dam, and water is abstracted for irrigation of the golf course. Because the volume of water impounded by the dam exceeds 25 Ml, the lake is considered to be a reservoir under the terms of the Reservoir (Safety Provisions) Act 1930, and visual inspections are made every week by a Reservoir Supervisor Engineer, while the crest of the dam is regularly surveyed for any signs of settlement of the dam, of which there were none as of 2014.

As part of the work associated with raising the level in the 1990s, a concrete spillway was constructed for the normal discharge from the reservoir. There are no other provisions for draining the reservoir down. From the spillway, water runs in a ditch beside a minor road, passes under Mole Road, and then runs through a 12-inch (300 mm) diameter culvert to reach another ditch which carries to water to the right bank of Barkham Brook. The brook continues in a north-westerly direction, until it almost reaches the River Loddon, but then turns to the north-east to pass under the M4 motorway embankment in its own culvert. It runs parallel to the Loddon for a short distance and joins it on its right bank below the weir for Sindlesham watermill.

== Water quality ==
The Environment Agency measure water quality of the river systems in England. Each is given an overall ecological status, which may be one of five levels: high, good, moderate, poor and bad. There are several components that are used to determine this, including biological status, which looks at the quantity and varieties of invertebrates, angiosperms and fish. Chemical status, which compares the concentrations of various chemicals against known safe concentrations, is rated good or fail.

The water quality of the Barkham Brook was as follows in 2019.

Section	Ecological Status	Chemical Status	Overall Status	Length	Catchment
Barkham Brook	Moderate	Fail	Moderate	4.8 miles (7.7 km)	7.23 square miles (18.7 km^{2})

The main reasons for the water quality being less than good are discharges from sewage treatment works, and physical modification of the channel, mostly in connection with land drainage, which presents obstacles to the movement of fish around the system.

== Bibliography ==
- Comrie, Alex (September 2014). "Chapter 3 - Assessment of Context" (PDF). Bearwood Park Design and Access Statement. Barton Willmore for Reading Football Club. Archived (PDF) from the original on 27 July 2020.
