= William of Drogheada =

William of Drogheda (died 1245) was an Irish academic and ecclesiastical lawyer.

== Life ==
A native of Drogheda, Ireland, William was the best known Oxford lawyer of the 13th century. He seems to have often pleaded cases at the University Church of St Mary the Virgin. His posts included rector of the church of Petha (Petham, Kent?) and in 1245 the rector of Grafton Underwood, Northamptonshire. He described himself as a regent in law.

His single work, Summa aurea, is concerned solely with legal practise, procedures and forms for canon law, presenting and winning a case. A recent description states that "The author's aim seems to have been to give a complete guide to every sort of action which an eccleiastical lawyer might have to deal."

William outlines procedures for:

- calling witnesses
- what to do if any – including the judge – fail to appear
- liability
- punishment
- behaviour of advocates and judges
- the question of fees
- the issuing of legal documents

The Summa is very incomplete, and appears to consist of the first of the six projected books of the work. This incompleteness may be due to it being abandoned due to its scale, rather than William's death.

Drogheda was murdered by his squire, Ralph de Boklande, at this house in the parish of St Peter-in-the-East, Oxford; it is now known as Drawda Hall, on High Street, Oxford.

In January 1241 he had granted it to the abbey of Monk Sherborne on condition that they celebrated daily mass "in our church of Sherborne where my mother and father will lie after their deaths and I along with them."
