= River Loddon =

River in southern England

Loddon
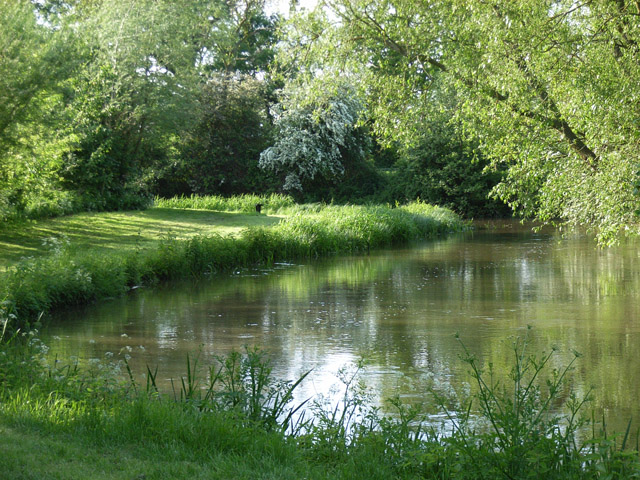
- River Loddon near Stratfield Saye

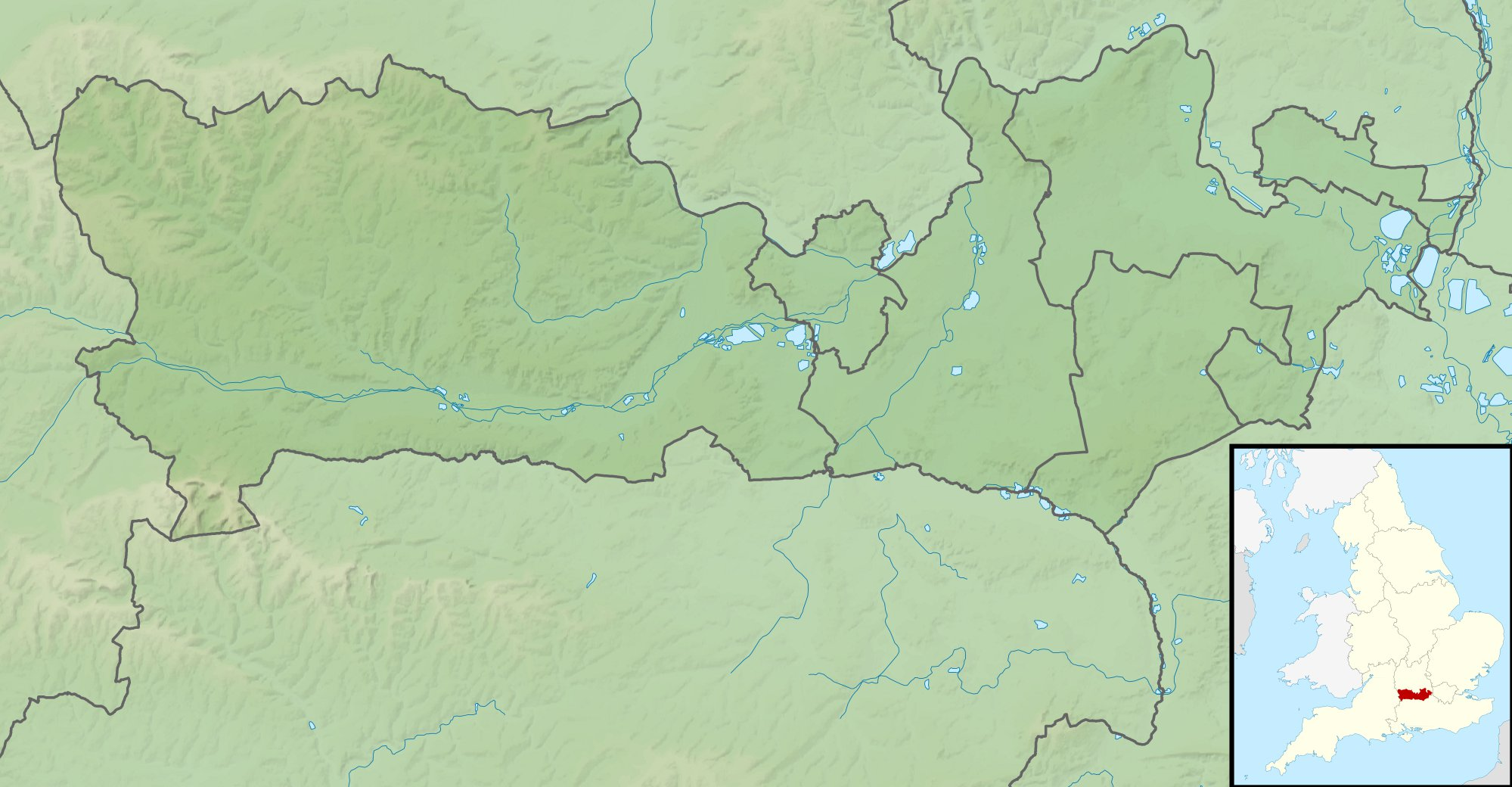
- Inflow to the Thames, south of Wargrave

Location
- Country: England
- Counties: Hampshire (ceremonial and administrative), Berkshire (ceremonial only)
- Districts / Boroughs: Basingstoke and Deane (Borough), Hart District (brief border), Wokingham Borough, West Berkshire (brief border)
- Town, suburban towns and small town: Basingstoke, Earley, Woodley, Twyford

Physical characteristics
- Source
  - location: Basingstoke, Hampshire, United Kingdom
  - coordinates: 51°15′53″N 1°06′57″W
  - elevation: 100 m (330 ft)
- Mouth: River Thames
  - location: Wargrave, Berkshire, United Kingdom
  - coordinates: 51°30′06″N 0°52′48″W
  - elevation: 33 m (108 ft)
- Length: 45 km (28 mi)
- Basin size: 1,036 km^{2} (400 sq mi)
- Discharge
  - location: Sheepbridge
  - average: 2.16 m^{3}/s (76 cu ft/s)
  - minimum: 0.52 m^{3}/s (18 cu ft/s)26 August 1976
  - maximum: 26.4 m^{3}/s (930 cu ft/s)16 September 1986

Basin features
- Progression: Loddon, Thames
- River system: Thames Basin
- Tributaries
  - left: Bow Brook, St Patrick's Stream
  - right: Lyde River, River Blackwater, Barkham Brook, Emm Brook, Twyford Brook

The River Loddon is a tributary of the River Thames in southern England. It rises at Basingstoke in Hampshire and flows northwards for 28 miles (45 km) to meet the Thames at Wargrave in Berkshire. Together, the Loddon and its tributaries drain an area of 400 square miles (1,036 km^{2}).

The river had many active mills, and has many remnants of flow modifications by the building up of mill pond reaches with weirs and sluices and the adjacent mill races (also called leats). Most of these used wheels to generate their power – two used water turbines. One was a silk mill for a short period, and one a paper mill, with the rest milling corn or producing flour. Several have been converted to become homes or hotels, but Longbridge Mill has been restored and still operates occasionally. The river has been used for recreational and possibly minor commercial navigation and in drier spells it can be safely canoed in some places.

The Loddon is a habitat for diverse wildlife. Former gravel workings have become Loddon Nature Reserve and Dinton Pastures Country Park. A section of it is a designated Site of Special Scientific Interest due to rare populations of bulbs and pondweed. Improvements made to the river under the Water Framework Directive, have included the installation of a fish bypass at Arborfield Mill for migratory species including salmon.

== Course ==
The Loddon rises at West Ham Farm, and two springs north of Bramblys Drive, in Basingstoke, and in its first mile flows under the Festival Place shopping centre of the town centre. The main bus station takes up where the wharf stood by what is no longer the Basingstoke Canal, its westernmost three miles having been filled in. The river emerges again in Eastrop Park, where it runs alongside Eastrop Way which supersedes the disused canal reach, on the park stood Basingstoke Corn Mill in 1873, but by 1932 it was called Vince's Farm, mill buildings still spanning the river. The river then passes through water-meadows where it is joined by small streams from the springs and reduced ponds of the north of Black Dam. These had to drain under a wide bend of canal embankment. Basingstoke Upper Mill stood south, 14 metres west of Redbridge Lane, still a corn mill in 1873, fields by 1932, now woodland by a multi-lane roundabout.

Where the flows meet is woodland that was the peat moor, at this point watercress was latterly grown such as in 1961. The Basingstoke Union Workhouse and added workhouse infirmary, stood where the Hampshire Clinic stands, a private hospital. East is the older third of Old Basing and the ruins of medieval Basing House (and Tudor/Jacobean house, north) below an old citadel with remnant ramparts and defensive walls.

A brick railway viaduct of four arches crosses – the South West Main Line. The house that was Old Basing Mill, a corn mill in 1932, Barton's Mill, is 95 metres north. Early 20th century watercress beds continued just north. A suburban hill road with access to a wooded east Basingstoke neighbourhood and key roads of Old Basing are linked by a brick, three-arch bridge of three arches over the Loddon; funded by public subscription, it opened in 1826. Immediately below, the river widens, as it formed a head of water (mill pond) for the Lower Mill, a corn mill in 1872, disused by 1932.

The river curves northward in a series of bends, past north Hampshire farms and a woodland-set golf course on the west bank in the south. Geodesically for 1.4 miles (2.3 km) two channels co-exist, often the northern being considered "upper". Petty's Brook (next to the town's main sewage works) joins, then after just under double that distance the Lyde joins, flowing from east of Old Basing. At Sherfield on Loddon, Longbridge Mill stands above Long Bridge of the main road to Reading, Berkshire. North, the river is joined the Bow Brook. The two flows sandwich the north half of Sherfield. Bow Brook rises about the same distance as the Loddon's source, but west, as four streams around Pamber End. The Loddon then passes: Lilly Mill, Lilly Mill Farm; fields; Broadford Bridge for a lane; rectory gardens/fields; Stratfield Saye church; and the ornamental grounds of Stratfield Saye House, the home of every Duke of Wellington since the first received that highest ennoblement in 1817 for leading in the Battle of Waterloo. In the park is a cast iron grade II* listed bridge of Thomas Wilson, 1802, design. Two-arch, thick-buttressed, Stanfordend Bridge – under which the Loddon enters its second and last county, Berkshire – marks the northern end of the park, against a skirting of woodland and is likewise listed. It bears the date 1787. Its namesake flour mill lay north, disused by 1961.

Past fields and scattered copses the river undershoots: the A33 road (bypassing Swallowfield), the lane borne by King's Bridge, then the bridge of Basingstoke Road next to Sheepbridge Mill (a corn mill in 1872, a hotel since 1968). Two fields north, the flow is more than doubled by the Blackwater.

After many fields and a little woodland the A327 takes Arborfield Bridge on which sits that house that served as Arborfield Paper Mill, out of production by 1899. To left are meadows and woodland, to right fields. The M4 bridge follows. After 1.3 kilometres (0.81 mi) of meadows (and the main outlet of Barkham Brook having meandered north from Barkham), Mill Lane crosses by Sindlesham Mill, extended to north to make a many-roomed hotel – in centuries past milling grain into flour. The meadows and those below abut the eastern suburbs of Berkshire: Earley and, downstream, Woodley, between which places and Winnersh five road bridges and a rail bridge stand.

The largest bridge carries the A3290, and has a construction defect, of 1972, see A329(M) motorway and Loddon Bridge disaster.

The course is then in the west part of Dinton Pastures Country Park. To east are vast lakes, from gravel and sand extraction, started modestly in the 19th century, ramped up in the 1960s and 70s. The near, long resultant lake is White Swan Lake. By the late 1970s, these were exhausted and left stopped up to flood, so Wokingham Borough Council could take ownership and create the country park.

Shortly after Dinton Pastures is Sandford Mill, a corn mill in 1873 which was disused by the 1960s. In fields west of Hurst:

- the river is joined by the Emm Brook.
- the river splits into two, the west channel being labelled "Old River" on most maps since 1894, both unmoved since at least 1873.

After the lakes the flows are crossed by the Great Western Main Line railway. Northwest is Charvil Country Park, amid the flows is Loddon Nature Reserve and northeast is Twyford, its Flour Mill at Silk Lane replaced by commercial blocks above which it received the Broadwater or Twyford Brook, the outlet of The Cut, until diverted east to Bray Lock around 1820. The A3032 crossing follows, then the A4. Half of St Patrick's Stream, a backwater of the River Thames, joins; 7/8 mile (1.4 km) north is junction with the Thames, just downstream of Shiplake Lock, on the southern limit of Wargrave.

== Milling ==
The river has powered more water mills than the many mentioned above. At Twyford, there have been mills since at least 1365, and a silk mill was built in 1810. Silk worms thrive on mulberry trees. Queen Elizabeth I encouraged planting of them in her reign.

The Wokingham area was known for its production of silk stockings, and the turn-of-the 19th century brothers, Thomas and George Billing from Macclesfield sought out a profitable business of processing. The spun silk was woven on looms set up in cottages, and for a while they were reasonably successful with labour costs kept down, employing children who should have been at Polehampton School. The law liberalised to allow silk to be imported more freely from France, and only mills equipped with up-to-date equipment could compete. Thomas died in 1824. The mill was sold to become a flour mill soon after. The wooden building was burnt down in a fire in 1891. A new mill was built, and in 1927 was bought by Berks, Bucks and Oxon Farmers Ltd, a farmers' co-operative, milling animal feed. The mill was powered by water wheels bolstered by diesel (and from the 1960s, electric) motors. A distribution warehouse was added in 1969, but a fire destroyed the mill in 1976, and construction of a new mill was completed in 1979. The new building was much larger than the old, and a section of Twyford Brook was culverted, to allow the buildings to extend onto land between the brook and the Loddon (ex-marsh). The owners became bankrupt in the 1990s, and in 2001 the site was redeveloped for housing. Much of the building has four storeys, as did the pre-1976 building with cosmetic features to hark back to the forerunners.

Sandford Mill was used for milling feed for animals until the 1950s, and was powered by two waterwheels. It is known to have existed during the English Civil War, as it was mentioned in reports. Following a period of disuse, it has been converted into a residence. The main structure of Sindlesham Mill dates from the late 1800s, but it may incorporate part of an earlier structure, as some of the timbers are much older than that. It used a turbine rather than a water wheel to generate its power, and was owned by the Reading-based Simmonds family, who were involved in banking and brewing. Later, it was acquired by Garfield Weston, and produced flour for the biscuit manufacturer Huntley & Palmers until the 1960s. It is now part of a hotel.

Milling had been performed at Arborfield since at least 1500, as foundations dating to that time were discovered in 1953. The mill was originally a grist mill, used for grinding corn or flour, but George Dawson converted it to a paper mill. A Mr. Hodgson was the paper maker in 1787, and in 1794 the business was auctioned as a going concern. In 1826, the large water wheel powered a 48-inch (120 cm) paper making machine. Three years later there was a fire at the mill, and another in 1861. Output from the mill included fine brown paper. Mrs Hargreaves, the owner of Arborfield Hall, is thought to have demolished part of the mill some time after 1861, but it was offered for sale again in 1919, and at the time included a 40-horsepower (30 kW) water wheel and a 28-horsepower (21 kW) turbine. Pumps and a dynamo supplied water and electricity to the hall, and powered the machinery on the farm. In the 1840s or 1850s, an engine house was built near the mill, which housed a steam engine manufactured in Reading by Barrett, Exall & Andrews. Two steam engines later powered the paper mill. The mill was owned by Guthrie Allsebrook from the 1920s, who hoped to supply water to the local authority, because he also owned the water rights. The ground floor of the building still exists, and was in use by Thames Water in 2004.

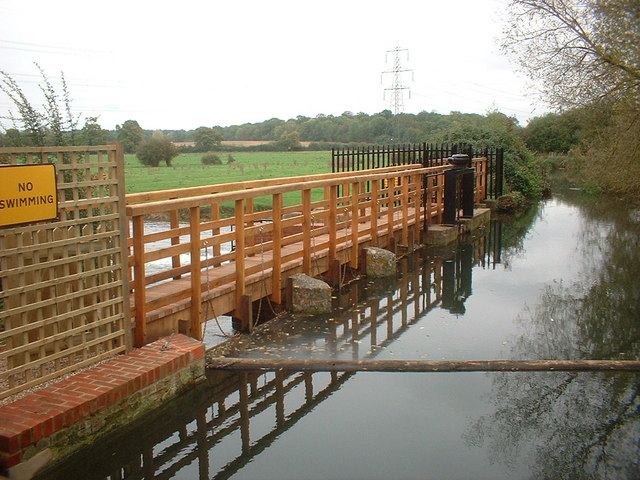
The weir and sluice at Longbridge Mill were refurbished in 2006.

Records show that milling was taking place near Sherfield on Loddon in 1274, when the miller was called John. There is also reference to a water mill in 1316, and a document recording holdings passed to the Manor in 1601 listed two water mills, a fulling mill and another mill. By 1819, there were two water wheels at the Longbridge mill, which powered four pairs of grinding wheels. By the end of the Second World War, the mill was producing animal feed, and continued to use water power until 1961. Commercial operation of the mill ceased in 1977, and it was damaged by fire in 1991. Restoration of the damaged building began soon afterwards, and was completed in 1997. Since then the mill has been operated on a monthly basis by the Hampshire Mills Group, and is used to grind flour on open days. The building dates from the sixteenth and eighteenth centuries, and is a listed building.

The mill at Stanfordend, to the north of Stratfield Saye Park, has been disused since the 1930s. Power was generated by the use of three turbines, rather than a water wheel. It is owned by the Duke of Wellington's estate, who had plans in 2000 to restore it to working condition. Hartley Mill, on the Lyde just above its junction with the Loddon, is now a residence, but the water wheel has been retained, and can be seen from the dining room. The Lower Mill at Old Basing is a four-storey building dating from the later eighteenth and early nineteenth centuries, and is grade II listed. Old Basing mill is another four-storey building, which still contained much of the original machinery in 2000, although it was not operational.

== Hydrology ==
Whilst chalk underlies much of the drainage basin, it only appears at the bed near Wargrave and Basingstoke. For the rest of its course the chalk lies beneath the Reading Beds and London Clay. The terrace gravels and sand of the valley have been partly extracted, as stated above.

The basin has large, quite dense population centres in Basingstoke and eastern Reading, plus the Farnborough/Aldershot Built-up Area so the Loddon takes treated sewage effluent from nine main plants, Basingstoke's (see above), seven of the Blackwater and one at Wargrave.

== Water quality ==
The Environment Agency measure water quality of the river systems in England. Each is given an overall ecological status, which may be one of five levels: high, good, moderate, poor and bad. There are several components that are used to determine this, including biological status, which looks at the quantity and varieties of invertebrates, angiosperms and fish. Chemical status, which compares the concentrations of various chemicals against known safe concentrations, is rated good or fail.

The water quality of the Loddon was as follows in 2019.

Section	Ecological Status	Chemical Status	Length	Catchment	Channel
Loddon (Basingstoke to River Lyde confluence at Hartley Wespall)	Poor	Fail	8.3 miles (13.4 km)	22.22 square miles (57.5 km^{2})	
Loddon (Hartley Wespall to Sherfield on Loddon)	Moderate	Fail	1.9 miles (3.1 km)	2.09 square miles (5.4 km^{2})	heavily modified
Loddon (Sherfield on Loddon to Swallowfield)	Moderate	Fail	7.6 miles (12.2 km)	11.97 square miles (31.0 km^{2})	
Loddon (Swallowfield to River Thames confluence)	Moderate	Fail	12.4 miles (20.0 km)	20.04 square miles (51.9 km^{2})	

Water quality improved after 2009, when the ecological status of the middle two sections was poor, and the chemical status of the lower Loddon to the Thames was fail. From 2015–16 the upper section improved to moderate, but the lower section was worse, moving from moderate to poor. Reasons for the water quality being less than good include the discharge of sewage effluent, physical barriers to the movement of fish caused by modifications to the channel, and dominant, disease-carrier North American signal crayfish. Like most rivers in the UK, the chemical status changed from good to fail in 2019, due to the presence of polybrominated diphenyl ethers (PBDE) and perfluorooctane sulphonate (PFOS), neither of which had previously been included in the assessment.

== Flora and fauna ==
=== The Loddon lily ===
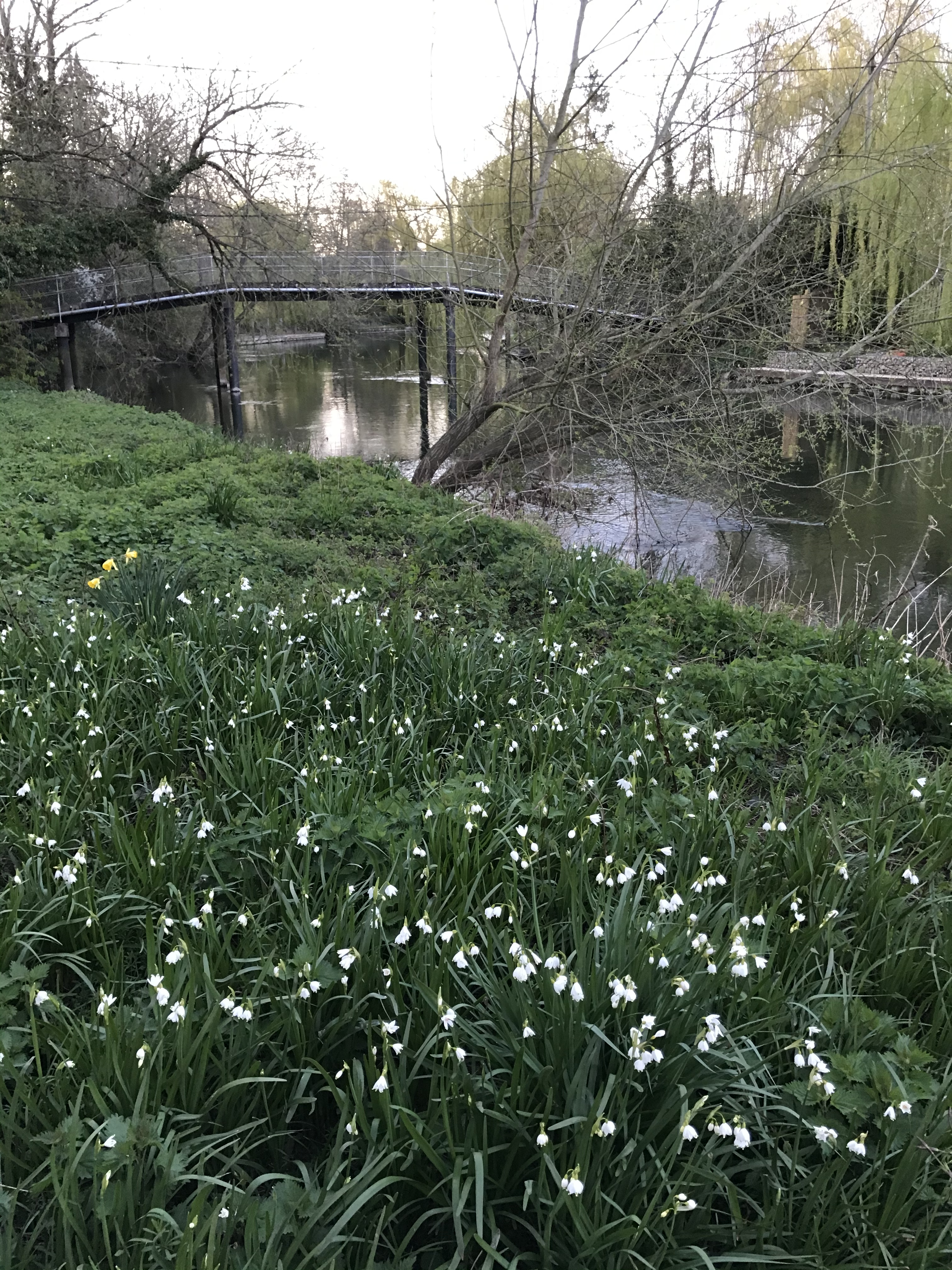
A large clump of Loddon lilies (Leucojum aestivum L.) in bloom on the banks of the Loddon, not far from its confluence with the Thames at Wargrave

Named for the river Loddon is the Loddon lily, Leucojum aestivum, a member, not of the lily family, but of the daffodil family Amaryllidaceae and known also as summer snowflake. A bulbous plant, which increases well on heavy clay soils, it is somewhat similar in appearance to a large snowdrop and thrives in wet meadows and willow thickets, being also prolific along the river banks and islands. Although less abundant than they used to be, Loddon lilies can still be found along the river Loddon, mainly in the vicinity of Sandford Mill.

Imagine, if you have never seen the wild Loddon Lily, a black swamp on the edge of the Thames, alders or willows overhead, a swamp which quivers and soggs and stinks. In the gloom, not the more usual light of Marsh Marigolds, but white flowers hanging in a severe purity from the end of the long stems. One thinks at first of an extra long Snowdrop, then of a new garden escape, except that there is no garden.

— Geoffrey Grigson, The Englishman's Flora

how so ornamental a plant, growing in so public a place, could have escaped the prying eyes of the many Botanists who have resided in London for such a length of time.

— William Curtis, Flora Londinensis

=== SSSI ===
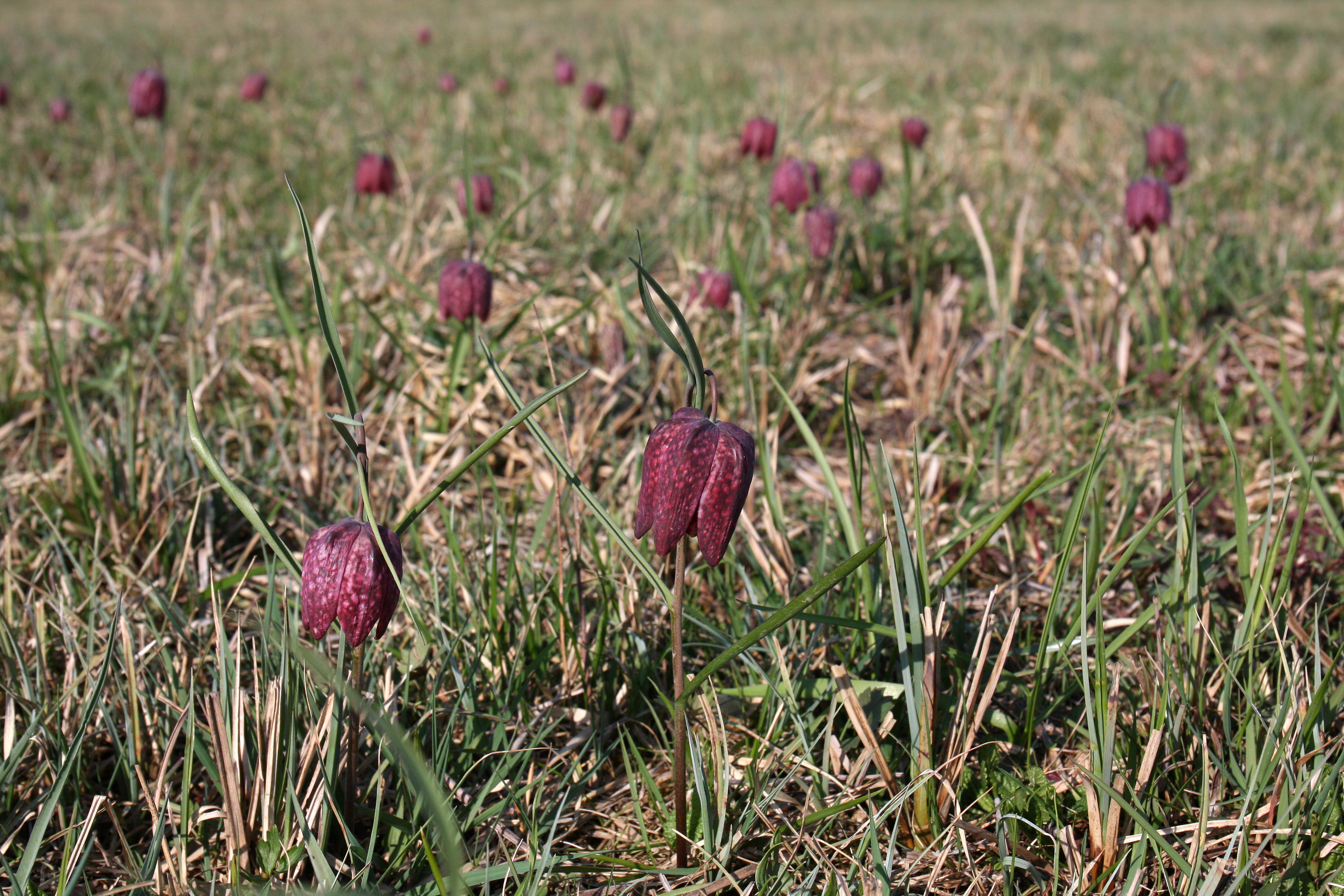
Fritillaria meleagris

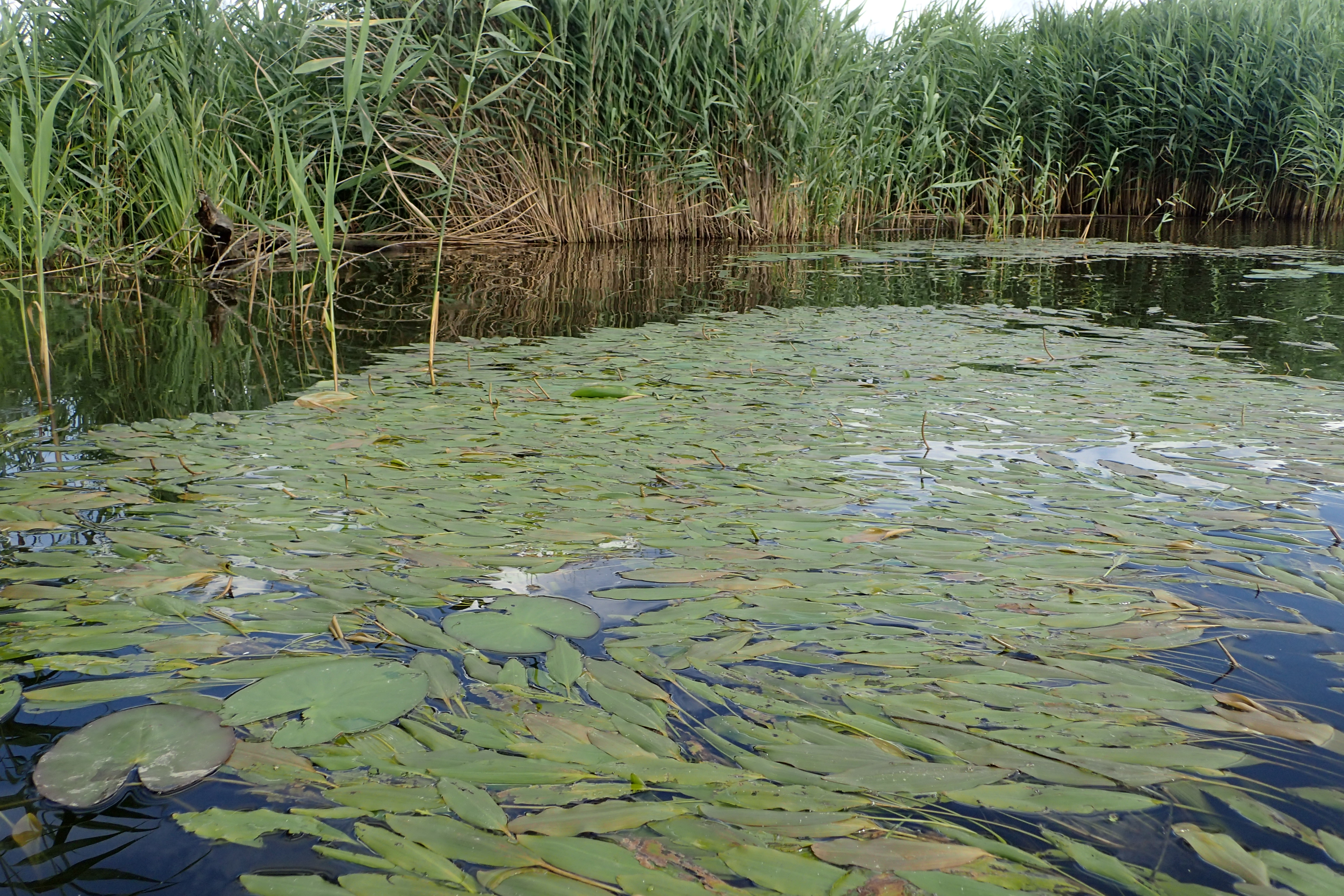
Potamogeton nodosus

A 2.5-mile (4.0 km) stretch of the Loddon near Stanford End Mill, together with the adjacent hay meadows, which are periodically waterlogged, is a designated Site of Special Scientific Interest (SSSI). The Loddon has been part of the SSSI since 1986. The meadows are cut for hay in July then grazed by cattle until the end of the year. This cycle has resulted in an increase in numbers of the snake's head fritillary (Fritillaria meleagris), another flowering bulb, which thrives in damp meadows when not regularly cut short by cutting. The river is included for its mainstay population of Loddon pondweed (Potamogeton nodosus).

=== Fish ===
The River Loddon has an identifiable array of fish, differing from the mainstream Thames locally including shoals of bream, chub, roach, rudd and large barbel. The record for the largest barbel caught on the river stands at 18 lb 1 oz (8.19 kg), caught in 2008. Other records include a 17 lb 12 oz (8.05 kg) pike caught in 1995 and same-weight carp caught in 2002.

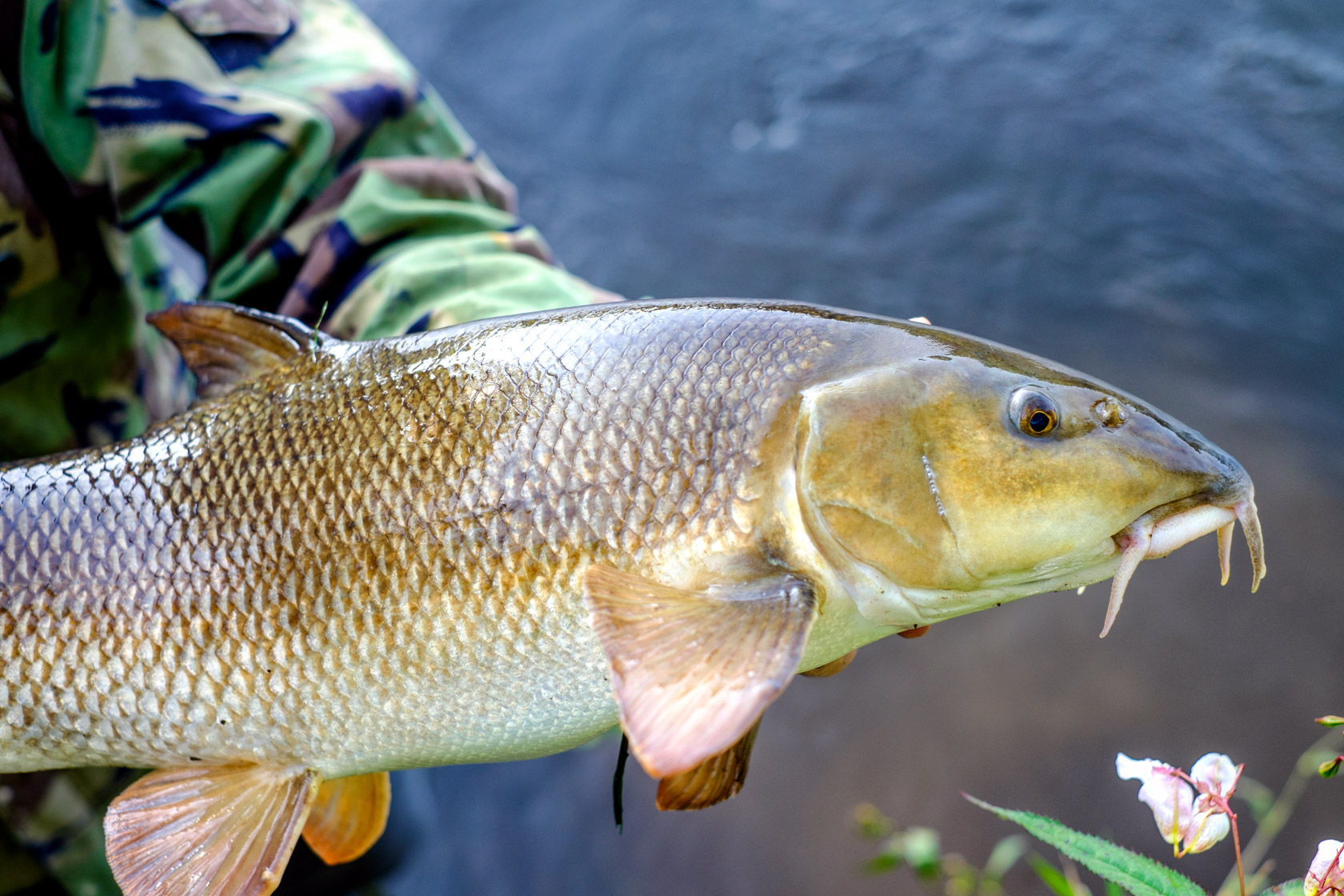
Angler holding a large barbel

To facilitate migrating fish, £485,000 was spent creating a 220-yard (200 m) bypass around weirs at Arborfield in 2010 – a project of the Environment Agency, Thames Water, the University of Reading, Farley Estate and Arborfield Angling Society, meeting the public spending commitment directed by the Water Framework Directive. This provided:

- new habitats, including 88 yards (80 m) suitable for fish to spawn, expected to be of benefit to salmon, sea trout, eels and barbel.
- repairs to four of the five weirs at Arborfield, to lower water on the 2.8-mile (4.5 km) section above, to reduce the flood profile.

Cain Bio-Engineering carried out the construction work and have claimed that the project constitutes a benchmark for such schemes.

In 2018, the first phase of a scheme to improve the river near Sandford Mill for fish was completed. Over the years, dredging of the river led to water flowing slowly through the enlarged channel, particularly in summer so the bed silted. Thames Water, Twyford and District Fishing Club, the Angling Trust, the Environment Agency and Wokingham Council thus felled trees to improve light, used the wood as flow deflectors as meanders, 80 tonnes of gravel were added and the faster flow prevent silting. Fast-flowing shallow riffles make spawning grounds for dace, chub and barbel. Means to prevent young fish from being washed downstream, in flood, exists in the dug-out Redlands backwater.

== Navigation ==
The lower Loddon was used for at least recreational navigation. On many reaches of the river, boat houses are marked on old maps, including two on the Arborfield estate, one of which still exists, one near Mill Lane at Sindlesham, and another at Woodley, near to Colmansmoor Lane. Other evidence includes postcards in the collection at Reading Local Studies Library, which show a punt at Twyford and rowing boats at Sindlesham Mill and Arborfield Hall. Old postcards also show that The George public house at Winnersh used to have rowing boats on the river available for hire. There was a boathouse on the opposite bank to the public house, one of eleven on the river around the 1900s.

Lady Constance Russell, writing in 1901 recorded that Sir Henry Russell, who owned Swallowfield Park and died in 1852, spent his latter years "improving" that, which included filling in the canal which "ran from the Lock Pool near the church to the Bow Bridge". The canal is clearly shown on a map produced in 1790 by Thomas Pride, and on an Enclosure Map for Swallowfield, produced in 1817 and held at the Berkshire Record Office. Further evidence for the use of the river was the death of John Alfred Dymott in 1917, who drowned after falling out of a punt, moving materials. He often performed such duties, here assisting the estate carpenter to erect fencing near the river and remove timber from it.

== Points of interest ==
Point	Coordinates (Links to map resources)	OS Grid Ref	Notes
Mouth of River Loddon	51.5017°N 0.8803°W	SU778786	By Shiplake Lock
Junction with St Patricks Stream	51.4914°N 0.8814°W	SU777775	
Site of Twyford Mill	51.4780°N 0.8723°W	SU784760	
Sandford Mill	51.4511°N 0.8779°W	SU780730	
A3290 Loddon Bridge	51.4377°N 0.9006°W	SU765715	An early bridge collapsed during construction
Sindlesham Mill	51.4273°N 0.8975°W	SU767703	
Arborfield Mill	51.4081°N 0.9244°W	SU749682	
Junction with River Blackwater	51.3854°N 0.9585°W	SU725656	
Site of Lilly Mill	51.3274°N 1.0326°W	SU675591	
Longbridge Mill	51.3187°N 1.0207°W	SU683581	
Basingstoke Lower Mill	51.2797°N 1.0424°W	SU668538	
Bartons Mill	51.2732°N 1.0530°W	SU661530	(Old Basing Mill)
Basingstoke Upper Mill	51.2658°N 1.0633°W	SU654522	
Festival Place	51.2660°N 1.0864°W	SU638522	river culverted
Source	51.2638°N 1.1239°W	SU612519	near West Ham Farm

== Cultural influence ==
Characterised generally as slow, swampy and tree-girt, the Loddon has inspired more than one work in verse.

In his lengthy and politically charged poem Windsor Forest Alexander Pope invents a nymph of the Loddon named Lodona, giving her a form of the name of the river Ládōn in Arcadia where the nymph Syrinx was transformed into a reed, as recounted in Ovid's Metamorphoses - from which work he also draws the familiar plot device of the chaste female delivered from the unwelcome attentions of a lustful god by her prayed-for transformation into a plant or watercourse. He chose a variant of the name of this mythological river for its obvious similarity to that of the Loddon, which ran for part of its course through Windsor Forest (the much-reduced remnant of which is now known as Windsor Great Park). He makes a further connection between the then royal protectress of Windsor, Queen Anne, and the goddess Diana, protectress of the Arcadian woods and the nymphs who dwelt in them. The personal, yet classically inspired mythology that Pope creates for his poem fables that Diana and her attendant nymphs once roamed the 'Windsor shade':

Here, as old Bards have sung, Diana stray'd
Bath'd in the Springs, or sought the cooling Shade;
Here arm'd with Silver Bows, in early Dawn,
Her buskin'd Virgins trac'd the Dewy Lawn.
Above the rest a rural nymph was fam'd,
Thy Offspring, Thames! the fair Lodona nam'd...

Pan saw and lov'd, and furious with Desire
Pursu'd her Flight; her Flight increas'd his Fire...

Let me, O let me, to the Shades repair,
"My native Shades — there weep, and murmur there.
She said, and melting as in Tears she lay,
In a soft, silver Stream dissolv'd away.
The silver Stream her Virgin Coldness keeps,
For ever murmurs, and for ever weeps;
Still bears the Name the hapless Virgin bore,
And bathes the Forest where she rang'd before...

The watry Landskip of the pendant Woods,
And absent Trees that tremble in the Floods...

The Loddon slow, with verdant alders crown'd...

Extracts from Windsor Forest
by Alexander Pope

The amiable and erudite Thomas Warton, negligent clergyman but diligent poet, spent much of his childhood beside the Loddon, near its sources in Basingstoke, for the infant Loddon then flowed through the grounds of the Parsonage House that belonged the living of the Vicar of Basingstoke, an incumbency filled by his father, Thomas Warton the elder from 1723 until his death in 1745. The 300-line poem The Pleasures of Melancholy, written by the precocious younger Warton at the age of just seventeen, contains the following lines concerning a poet lost in reverie by a shady, wooded stream at eventide that convey the strong impression of inspiration by the slow and drowsy Loddon:

...in embowering woods
By darksome brook to muse, and there forget
The solemn dulness of the tedious world,
While Fancy grasps the visionary fair:
And now no more th' abstracted ear attends
The water's murmuring lapse, th' entranced eye
Pierces no longer through th' extended rows
Of thick-ranged trees; till haply from the depth
The woodman's stroke, or distant tinkling team
Or heifers rustling through the brake, alarms
Th' illuded sense, and mars the golden dream.

To the River Lodon (1777)

Ah! what a weary race my feet have run
Since first I trod thy banks with alders crowned,
And thought my way was all thro' fairy ground,
Beneath thy azure sky and golden sun;
Where first my muse to lisp her notes begun!
While pensive Memory traces back the round,
Which fills the varied interval between;
Much pleasure, more of sorrow, marks the scene.
Sweet native stream! those skies and suns so pure
No more return, to cheer my evening road!
Yet still one joy remains, that, not obscure,
Nor useless, all my vacant days have flowed,
From youth's gay dawn to manhood's prime mature;
Nor with the muse's laurel unbestowed.

the ninth sonnet of Thomas Warton
(8th Poet laureate, 20 April 1785 – 21 May 1790)

== See also ==
- Tributaries of the River Thames
- List of rivers in England

== Bibliography ==
- Arborfield (2012). "The River Loddon: A Navigable Waterway?". Arborfield Local Historical Society. Archived from the original on 5 April 2019.
- Bowes, Michael J; et al. (1 September 2018). "Weekly water quality monitoring data for the River Thames" (PDF). Centre for Ecology and Hydrology. Archived (PDF) from the original on 28 April 2019.
- Deacon, Malcolm; et al. (26 October 1972). "Digging for dear life..." Wokingham Times. Archived from the original on 3 March 2016.
- Ditchfield, P H; Page, William, eds. (1923). "Parishes: Ruscombe". A History of the County of Berkshire. Vol. 3. British History Online. Archived from the original on 5 March 2016.
- Dunlop, Lesley, ed. (2019). "Gravels of Berkshire" (PDF). Berkshire Geoconservation Group. Archived (PDF) from the original on 23 June 2020.
- Eighteen, Brian (2000). "Watermills on the River Loddon". Wargrave Local History Society. Archived from the original on 14 January 2017.
- Fitch, John (1989). Twyford and Ruscombe Village Walks. Twyford and Ruscombe Local History Society. ISBN 0-948245-05-0.
- Russell, Lady Constance (1901). Swallowfield and its Owners. Longman.
- Summerhayes, Stuart D (10 March 2010). "Section 1: Introduction". Design Risk Management Contribution to Health and Safety (PDF). Wiley. ISBN 978-1-4051-3275-6. Archived (PDF) from the original on 31 May 2019.
- Welch, Ian (30 July 2018). "Anglers celebrate first phase of River Loddon restoration scheme". Slough Express. Archived from the original on 22 June 2020.

=== References ===
Next confluence upstream	River Thames	Next confluence downstream
Berry Brook (north)	River Loddon	Hennerton Backwater
