= Pamber Priory =

Church in Monk Sherborne, Hampshire, England

Coordinates: 51.321735°N 1.133936°W

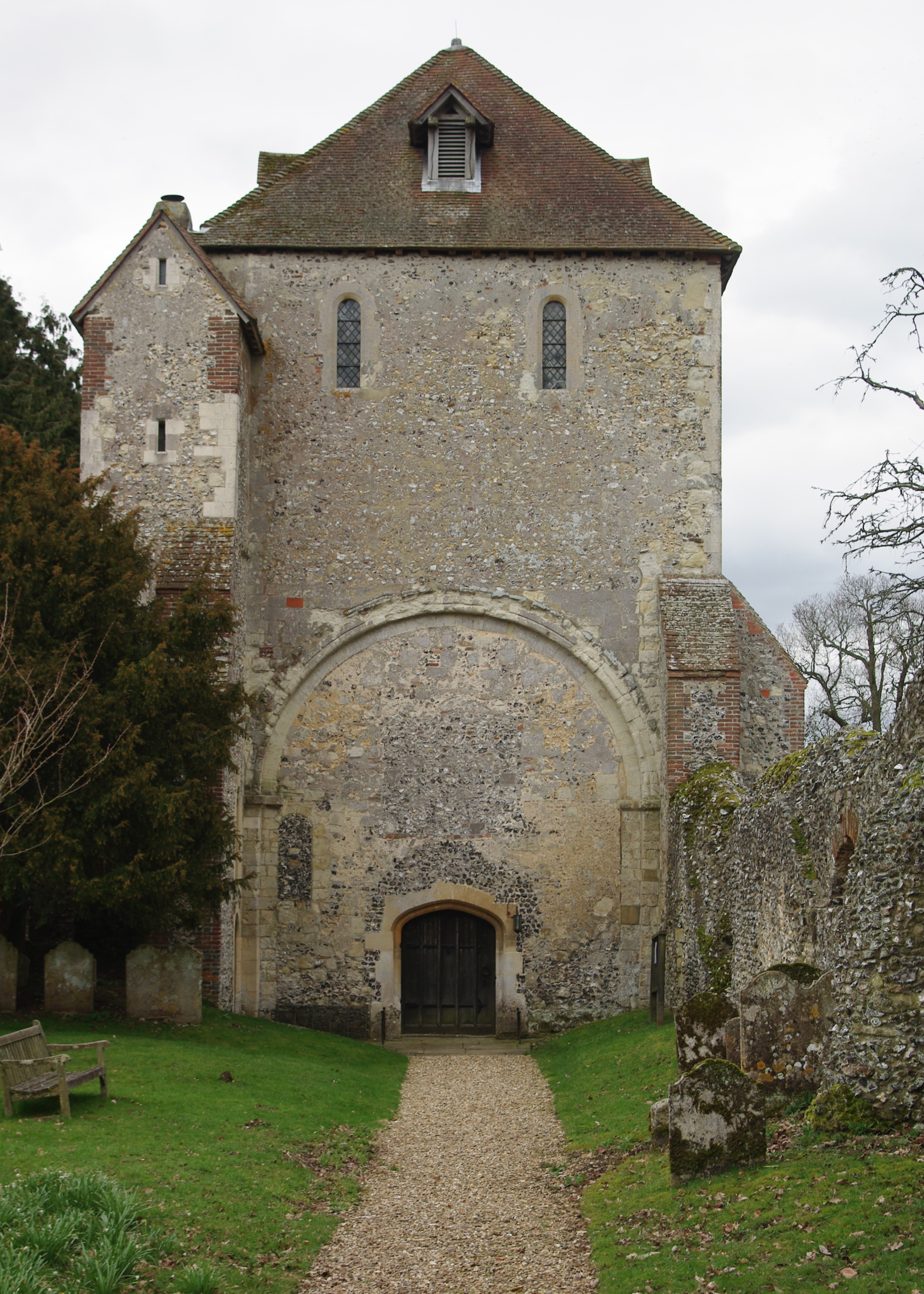
Pamber Priory Church in Hampshire, showing the 12th-century tower and the remains of the nave wall on the right.

Pamber Priory is a Church of England parish church and former priory, then known as West Sherborne Priory or Monk Sherborne Priory, at Monk Sherborne in the English county of Hampshire.

== History ==
The manor of Monk Sherborne is an ancient manor, as it was documented during the reign of Edward the Confessor, when it was held by Alnod Cild. By the time of the Domesday Book compiled in 1086, it was held by Hugh de Port. A church building was consecrated by the Bishop of Winchester, William Giffard, and although the exact date is unknown, Giffard was bishop between 1107 and 1129. It is also unclear how much of the building was complete at the time of the consecration, since the only parts of the present building that clearly date to that time are the arches of the crossing, which was below the central tower, and parts of the south wall of the nave. All of the detailing of the tower dates from later in the 12th century.

Hugh's son, Henry de Port, founded a priory in 1130, which was an outpost of the Abbey of Saint Vigor in Cerisy, Normandy. As well as giving the church building to the priory, Henry de Port also gave them money to allow the monks to serve the parish church of Newnham. In this context, he made a charter around 1130, which mentions the tithes from two watermills in Newnham, which were probably Hook Mill on the River Whitewater and Lyde Mill on the River Lyde. The de Port family came from Normandy, close to the Abbey of Saint Vigor, and the foundational charters have survived in the archives of The Queen's College, Oxford. These show that Henry wanted there to be a convent of monks at Sherborne to serve God, and to look after the spiritual well-being of his family, his friends and his neighbours.

The original building was cruciform, with no aisles, but around 1220 parts of it were reconstructed, and the chancel at the eastern end was extended to become the presbytery. A cloister was built on the south side of the nave, with a western range beyond, but only the quire, below the tower, and the presbytery remain. At some point, two side chapels were added to the chancel, adjoining the transepts, but its in unclear whether these dated from the 12th or 13th century. A significant amount of building work took place between 1255 and 1260, aided by gifts of timber from the King's forest by Henry III, who visited the priory on at least five occasions between 1251 and 1261. The Benedictine priory was conventual, as it did not have an abbot, and the community was autonomous. However, because it was an offshoot of the Abbey of St Vigor and was therefore classed as an alien priory, it was viewed with suspicion by the civil authorities, but less so by the Bishops of Winchester, who accepted the monks as patrons of the livings from the churches at Church Oakley and Bramley.

The priory appears to have been economically viable during this early period, but following the death of Henry III in 1272, conditions changed for most religious houses, including Monk Sherborne. Edward I passed a Statute of Mortmain in 1279, which prevented patrons from giving land to the church, and so a valuable source of income for the priory ceased, as did royal patronage, which had been fairly regular under Henry III. Edward I went to war with Philip IV of France in 1294, and the priory was assessed as part of an inventory of alien property. In 1294, the priory had an income of £130, only exceeded in Hampshire and the Isle of Wight by Hayling Priory, which had an income of £144. Edward's confiscation of alien property set a precedent, which was used repeatedly by subsequent kings. The prior could regain custody of their buildings by paying a fine, and Monk Sherborne managed to pay the fines, but the priory was confiscated for a second time by Edward II. The king took over the advowson of the priory, allowing him to appoint the clergy in the priory's churches at Newnham and Church Oakley in 1326.

The Hundred Years War began in 1337, and the priory was kept under close scrutiny. In July, it was confiscated again, and two years later it was assessed, at which time its income was £88 12s 7d (£88.63), barely enough to cover the rent for the priory. In 1348 the country was decimated by the Black Death, and in 1350 the Bishop of Winchester notified the Abbey of St Vigor that Monk Sherborne Priory had "... reached such desolation and spiritual decline, with sterility of its lands, that the place is now destitute ...". It appears that some monks returned to Cerisy, but the records are confusing as to how many departed. When war with France ended in 1361, the priory was given back to the monks, and some of its appears of fines were cancelled. In October 1364, debts for a further £1,306, mostly unpaid fines, were rescinded, and when war broke out with France again in 1369, Prior William was entrusted with keeping the priory, but no payments were required because the lands and building were in such a bad state that there was barely enough to keep the monks and servants.

By the 1380s, income was only £22 3s 3d (£22.16) partly due to exploitation by the king, and partly due to the failure of others to pay rent, in the aftermath of the Black Death. A brief period of respite followed the start of Henry IV's reign in 1399, as foreign monks could return to the country, and conventual priories were exempt from the seizure of alien lands in 1401. Bishop Wykeham drew up a list of alien priories for the king in 1401, and Monk Sherborne was omitted, because it was conventual.

The prior ceased to be an alien priory from 1446, and in 1462 the manor was given to the Hospital of St. Julian at Southampton, which was known as God's House. The Hospital had previously been given to The Queen's College, Oxford by Edward III, and so the college became responsible for the priory.

In the 15th century, Queen's College founded a chantry, and the presiding priest also ministered to those who lived nearby in Pamber, but had no parish church, as if it was a chapel of ease. This was obviously well received, because when the chantry was dissolved in 1547 following the Dissolution of the Monasteries, the local people felt that the priory chapel was their church, and brought a suit in the Court of Chancery against the officers of the College for failing to provide a priest. As patrons, Queen's College carried out restorations of the building in 1843 and 1936, and it has since become a grade I listed structure. In 1911, the College were still giving £1 3s 4d (£1.17) to the poor of the parish every year on 2 January, in respect of a gift made by Adam de Port in the 12th century.

== Bibliography ==
- Bell, Nigel (June 2004). "Newnham - a history of its parish and its church" (PDF). www.northhampshirechurches.org.uk. Archived (PDF) from the original on 2 July 2020.
- Grant, Moira (2000). The Alien Benedictine Priory of Monk Sherborne (PDF). Vol. 55. Hampshire Field Club. Archived (PDF) from the original on 7 July 2020.
- Page, William, ed. (1911). "Parishes: Monk Sherborne". A History of the County of Hampshire. Vol. 4. British History Online.

== External sources ==
Media related to Pamber Priory at Wikimedia Commons
