= Loddon Viaduct collapse =

1972 English construction disaster

Coordinates: 51°26′20.8″N 0°53′53.9″W

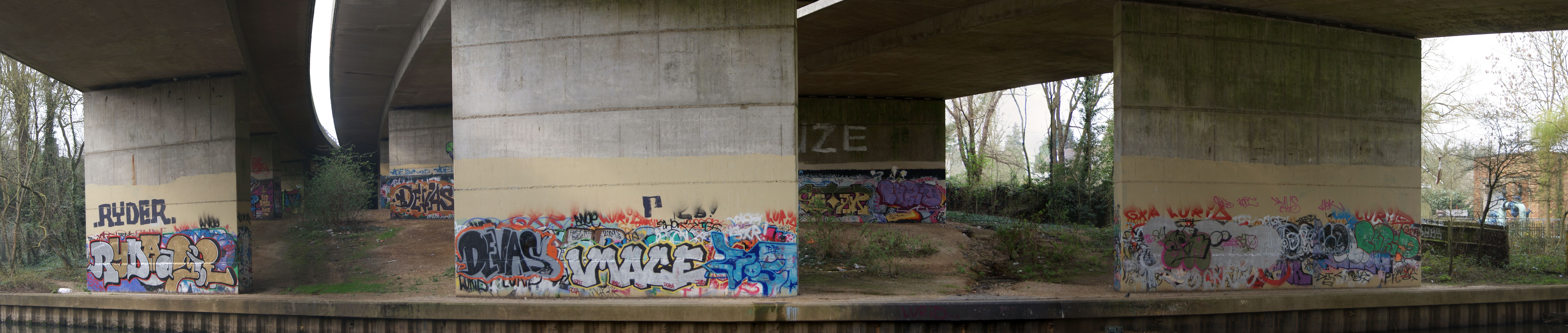
The three A329(M) crossings of the Loddon, pictured in 2011. The eastbound carriageway, here the right-most, was the one that collapsed under construction. The River Loddon can be seen in the foreground.

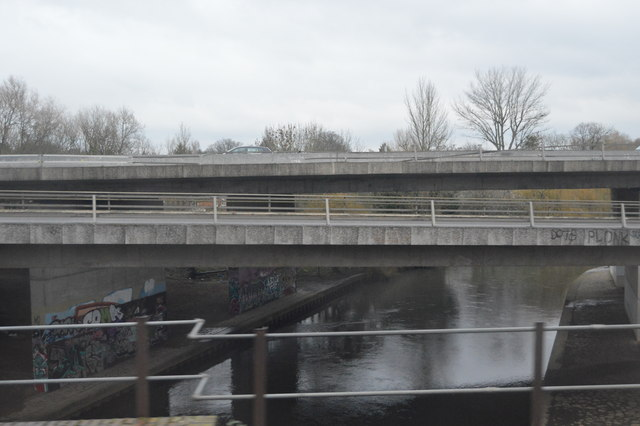
2016 photograph of the A329(M) Loddon crossing, taken from the railway bridge to the south. The eastbound carriageway is the furthest of the three bridges constructed in the 1970s, masked by the westbound on-slip and westbound carriageway structures.

The Loddon Viaduct collapse was a falsework collapse during construction of a reinforced concrete deck on the Loddon Bridge of the A329(M) motorway in Berkshire, England, on 24 October 1972. It killed three people and injured ten others. It is thought that a design error led part of the falsework, transitioning between the deck and the supporting towers, to be understrength and it failed by buckling or twisting. The part-poured deck fell into the river below. The collapse was investigated by Her Majesty's Factory Inspectorate and the contractor, Marples Ridgway pleaded guilty to a breach of the construction regulations at a trial in Bracknell, being fined £150 (equivalent to £1,631 in 2025).

The collapse led to the Advisory Committee on Falsework, chaired by Brunel University vice-chancellor Stephen Bragg and consequently known as the Bragg Report. The committee, whose final report was published in 1975, made a number of recommendations for changes in how falsework was designed, constructed and dismantled. These formed the basis of British Standard 5975: 1982, Code of practice for falsework (now BS 5975-1 and -2: 2024). The Bragg Report had a wider impact on how temporary works were managed in the UK including establishing procedures and the position of temporary works coordinator.

== Background and temporary works design ==
The bridge was part of a viaduct built by contractor Marples Ridgway in Reading, Berkshire, as part of the A329(M) motorway, a link road to the M4 motorway to the east. The eastbound and westbound carriageways and a separate on-slip to the westbound carriageway were all constructed on separate post-tensioned reinforced concrete viaduct structures. The westbound viaduct had been completed early in 1972.

The eastbound viaduct consisted of 13 spans between reinforced concrete piers. The span over the River Loddon, which was the one that collapsed, measured 93 feet (28 m) between piers 35 feet 6 inches (10.82 m) wide. The deck was 4 feet (1.2 m) thick in the centre, tapering at the outer edges, with an average depth of 1 foot (0.30 m). It was skew in plan, by around 37 degrees from the angle of the pier, and had a 1:29.25 crossfall built in.

The deck was formed from in-situ concrete laid onto timber plank formwork which was supported by a system of falsework. This consisted of a series of 26 lattice trusses beneath the deck. These measured 98 feet 4 inches (29.97 m) in length (extending into an adjacent span) and were made of four lattice sections connected together by scaffolding. The trusses were of a German system built under licence by Rapid Metal Developments.

The trusses were supported by 24-foot (7.3 m) high trestle towers adjacent to each pier. The trusses were connected to the towers by rocker bearings. These were supported by a two-layer grillage of I-beams. The upper layer was formed of 10-by-10-inch (250 mm × 250 mm) universal column sections running perpendicular to the carriageway. These were supported by the lower layer, formed of 12-by-6.5-inch (300 mm × 170 mm) universal beam sections running parallel to the carriageway. The lower layer of the grillage was supported by the 16 pairs of forkheads at the tops of the towers. The towers were manufactured by French company Indumat.

== Collapse ==
In August 1972, the falsework that had supported the westbound carriageway deck pour was moved over to the eastbound carriageway. The two structures were separated by a gap of just 2 feet 10 inches (0.86 m). The falsework was dragged across on a temporary track. It was inspected and some defects were rectified before it was put into use. Some questions were raised as to whether the falsework was truly plumb, but works proceeded.

The concrete to the eastbound carriageway deck was poured on 24 October 1972. It was estimated that around 750 cubic yards (570 m^{3}) of concrete would be required, of which 500 cubic yards (380 m^{3}) was on top of the River Loddon falsework system and the remainder over adjacent spans. Four concrete pumps were provided and four gangs of workers, 30 men in total, with 14 vibrating pokers were in use. Placement of concrete began at 8:30 am at a rate of around 84 cubic yards (64 m^{3}) per hour, dropping to 50 cubic yards (38 m^{3}) per hour later that morning before rising again to 88 cubic yards (67 m^{3}) per hour.

At 1:35 pm, the east end of the formwork fell around 6 inches (150 mm). Seconds later, the entire deck plunged into the river below. The trestle towers at the east end of the span overturned and fell onto the deck, though those at the west end remained standing. Three workers were killed and 10 injured, 7 of them seriously.

== Investigation ==
The collapse was investigated by Her Majesty's Factory Inspectorate. The investigation was difficult as the falsework had collapsed into the river bed and been covered by the concrete which had set on top of it. Inspectors found that the steel beam support grillages at the eastern end were badly twisted and buckled. It was considered that the horizontal force imposed on them had caused deformation which had led to a progressive collapse. Tests determined that the grillage arrangement had a factor of safety of just 1.3 when ideal conditions and vertical loads only were considered. They thought that larger beams should have been used or stiffeners welded to the beams (they noted that where a stiffener had been welded to a beam due to damage before the pour it had resisted deformation). The beam size was found to be a mistake in the design calculations; beams 50 per cent larger should have been specified. This was not picked up by a design check.

The inspectors found that the foundations for the falsework were satisfactory. They thought that the towers, which were freestanding, ought to have been braced against the adjacent piers but did not think this was a direct cause of the collapse. The inspectors noted that the same falsework arrangement had sufficed for the westbound deck pour, which was under a heavier load. They considered that the falsework may have been damaged when moved, noting that some trestle legs had been repaired afterwards.

As secondary matters they found that some bolts used in assembling the falsework were missing or too short to accept a full nut. They also found that the ends of some of the grillage I-beams had been tapered by flame cutting, reducing their effective web area by around 30 per cent. The inspectors considered that, although some bracing was provided between the support trusses, this was insufficient when the horizontal and dynamic forces were considered. The bearing arrangement below the trusses was also considered sub-standard. The bearings were rough and unlubricated, providing resistance to rotation which was not considered in the temporary works design (which considered the bearing as an ideal pin joint). The pads below the bearings were only lightly attached to the universal columns in the grillage, not ideal when horizontal loading was expected.

== Trial ==
Marples Ridgway were prosecuted under the construction regulations of the Factory Acts at Bracknell magistrates court. A consultant giving evidence stated that the loading imposed on the grillage was particularly difficult to assess and the designers should have recognised this and strengthened the beams, for example with stiffener plates welded to the web. The court found that the failure to check the design had led to the collapse through buckling of the beams. Marples Ridgway were fined £150 and ordered to pay £150 costs after pleading guilty.

== Bragg Report ==
As a result of the disaster the Advisory Committee on Falsework was appointed by Maurice MacMillan, Secretary of State for Employment, and Geoffrey Rippon, Secretary of State for the Environment, on 13 March 1973. Its terms of reference were to advise on all aspects of the design, manufacture, erection and maintenance of falsework, particularly in the construction of bridges. It was specifically to identify any deficiency in current knowledge, standards and practices; to draw up interim criteria for use in advance of the publication of a British Standard on the subject and to provide recommendations for further research. The committee was chaired by Stephen Bragg, vice-chancellor of Brunel University, and included Danish engineer Povl Ahm of Ove Arup and Partners, F M Bowen of Scott Wilson Kirkpatrick and Partners, S Champion a consulting engineer in the scaffolding industry, L C Kemp national secretary of the Transport and General Workers' Union, J C S Mott of French Kier, Christopher J Wilshere head of temporary works department at John Laing Design Associates Ltd., and secretaries seconded from the Health and Safety Executive (W E J Greville) and the Department of the Environment (I J Hume)

The committee issued an interim report in April 1974 and its final report (commonly known as the Bragg Report) in 1975. The committee investigated the Loddon Bridge collapse. They were unable to find any calculations by Marples Ridgeway in regards to resistance to buckling or twisting in the grillage beams. They considered that the designer should have anticipated horizontal loads being introduced into the grillage through the bending of the trusses under loading. They also found that the thickness of some of the I-beam sections in the grillage varied widely due to manufacturing error. Bragg also considered the 1958 collapse of a span of the Second Narrows Crossing in British Columbia, the 1966 collapse of falsework at Welshpool road overpass in Western Australia, the 1966 collapse of falsework at the Heron Road Bridge in Ontario, Canada, the 1971 collapse of falsework at the Birling Road Overbridge in Kent; the 1972 collapse of the Arroyo Seco Bridge (Route 210) in California and the 1973 Skyline Towers collapse in Virginia.

The committee made a number of recommendations including:

- Checks to be made by clients on the competence of contractors appointed for temporary works design and installation
- That formal design briefs be completed by the contractor for issue to the falsework designer, to include details of the contractor's working method. The brief to be checked by the designer for completeness of information.
- That falsework designs be checked, the committee noted that the Heron Road collapse had led to a formal requirement for checking in Canada by approved designers, but that such a rigid system might not be necessary in the UK. They suggested that the contractor checks the design or passes it to a separate designer to check, noting a similar requirement had been recommended by Alec Merrison's committee on the design of steel box girder bridges.
- That the permanent works designer makes use of their right under the ICE Conditions of Contract, commonly used for civil engineering works, to request and review temporary works designs. The committee noted that this right was not allowed by the Joint Contracts Tribunal contract then common in building contracts.
- Where falsework is modified on site it should be checked by the temporary works designer
- That the contractor make continuous inspections of falsework at all stages of the works
- That lookouts be positioned when falsework is first loaded to observe any unusual deflection and that tell-tale devices or strain gauges be used to measure movement of the falsework
- That falsework designs include the loading sequence and any deviations from this be approved by the designer
- That the presence of people under loaded falsework is minimised
- That a Temporary Works Coordinator (TWC) be appointed by the contractor to ensure that all procedures and checks have been carried out. The TWC would be responsible for issuing a permit to load any falsework within 24 hours of a pour and a permit to strike issued to allow dismantling to commence. The committee recommended that the TWC be a chartered engineer with experience in falsework construction and to have attended a national training course that the committee proposed introducing. They recommended that the TWC look after other temporary works, such as access bridges, as well as just falsework.

The report led to the development of British Standard 5975: 1982 Code of practice for falsework, the first for falsework. BS 5975 required appointment of a falsework co-ordinator on sites required to allocate design responsibility and ensure that a design was checked. Since the adoption of the standard there have been no large-scale failures of falsework systems in the UK.

The committee's findings had a wide impact on the design and construction of all temporary works, beyond falsework. The procedures in BS 5975, which had been adopted following Bragg's recommendations, were adopted by the temporary works sector of the British construction industry. This was formalised in 2008 when the standard was renamed Code of practice for temporary works procedures and the permissible stress design of falsework and the role of falsework coordinator became that of temporary works coordinator, as originally proposed by Bragg. The standard was updated in 2019 and again in 2024 - when it was split into two parts: BS 5975-1: 2024 Temporary works. Management procedures for the control of temporary works. Code of practice; and BS 5975-2: 2024 Temporary works. Falsework: Design and implementation. Code of practice.
