= Monk Sherborne =

Village and parish in Hampshire, England

Coordinates: 51.3033°N 1.1333°W

- Location within Hampshire
- Population: 384 (2011 Census)
- Shire county: Hampshire
- Region: South East
- Country: England
- Sovereign state: United Kingdom
- Post town: Tadley
- Postcode district: RG26
- Police: Hampshire and Isle of Wight
- Fire: Hampshire and Isle of Wight
- Ambulance: South Central
- UK Parliament: North East Hampshire

Monk Sherborne is a village in north Hampshire, England.

Sherborne Priory is the burial place of William of Drogheda.

== Governance ==
Monk Sherborne is a civil parish and is part of the Sherborne St. John ward of Basingstoke and Deane borough council. The borough council is a Non-metropolitan district of Hampshire County Council.
