= Loddon Nature Reserve =

Nature reserve in Berkshire, England

Coordinates: 51°28′30″N 0°52′18″W

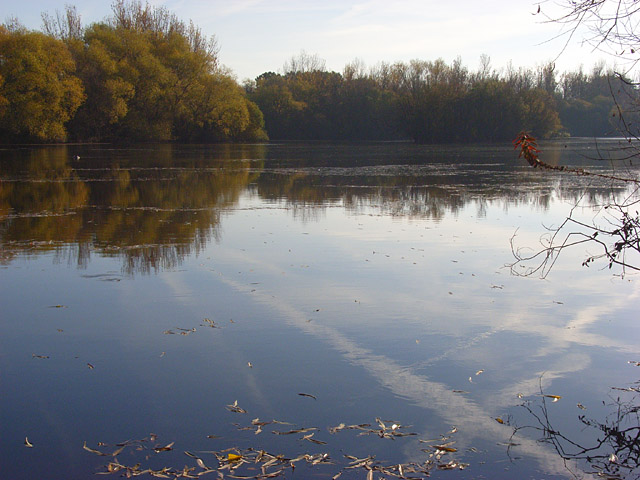
- Interactive map of Loddon Nature Reserve
- Type: Nature reserve
- Location: Twyford, Berkshire
- OS grid: SU 785 757
- Area: 14 hectares (35 acres)
- Manager: Berkshire, Buckinghamshire and Oxfordshire Wildlife Trust

Loddon Nature Reserve is a 14-hectare (35-acre) nature reserve on the edge of the village of Twyford in Berkshire. It is managed by the Berkshire, Buckinghamshire and Oxfordshire Wildlife Trust.

== Geography and site ==
Loddon Nature Reserve is located on the site of a former gravel pit which is now flooded and has woody surrounds. The flooded gravel pit has several islands.

== Fauna ==
The site has the following fauna:

=== Birds ===
- Anas strepera
- Smew
- Tufted duck
- Pochard
- Snipe
- Sylvia atricapilla
- Sterna hirundo
- Fulica atra
- Phalacrocorax carbo
- Podiceps cristatus
- Ardea cinerea
- Gallinula chloropus
- Haematopus ostralegus
- Aythya ferina
- Anas clypeata
- Anas crecca
- Aythya fuligula
- Sylvia communis
- Anas penelope
- Phylloscopus trochilus
- Little grebe
- Eurasian sparrowhawk
- Common kestrel
- Tawny owl
- Barn owl
- Little owl
- Lesser spotted woodpecker
- European green woodpecker
- Great spotted woodpecker
- Common redshank
- Common swift
- Common goldeneye
- Common merganser
- Water rail
- European stonechat
- Green sandpiper
- Common sandpiper

== Flora ==
The site has the following flora:

=== Plants ===
- Lythrum salicaria
- Iris pseudacorus
