= Foxhill House =

Building on Whiteknights campus of the University of Reading, England

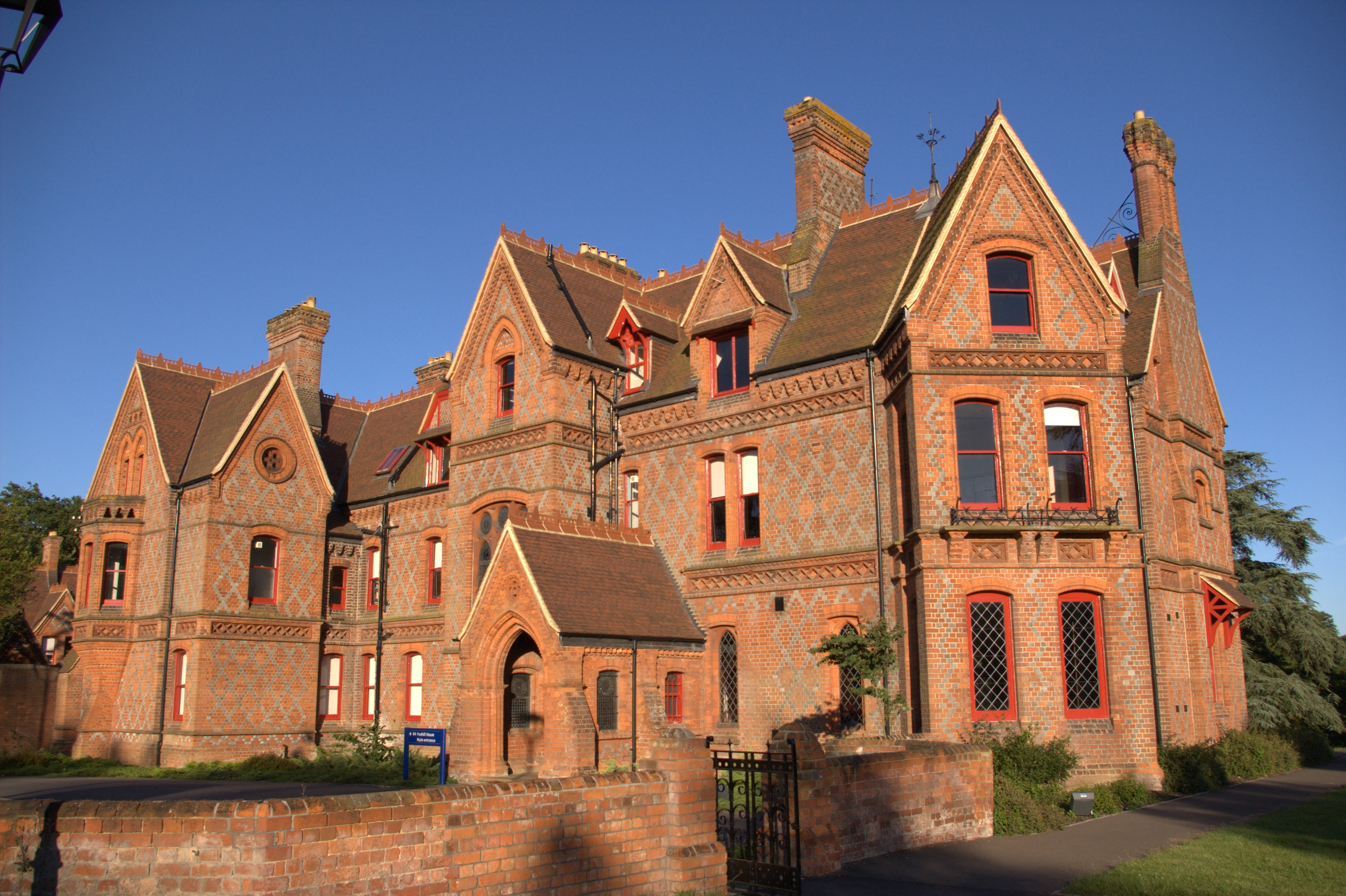

- Location within Reading, Berkshire

General information
- Architectural style: Gothic Revival
- Location: Earley, Berkshire, England
- Coordinates: 51.44492°N 0.94236°W
- Year built: 1868

Design and construction
- Architect: Alfred Waterhouse

Listed Building – Grade II*
- Official name: Foxhill House
- Designated: 19 September 1983
- Reference no.: 1136050

Foxhill House is a Gothic Revival style building on what is now the Whiteknights campus of the University of Reading at Earley, adjoining the English town of Reading. It currently houses the university's School of Law.

Foxhill House is a Grade II* listed building. The former stables and coach house immediately to the north east, which are now physically connected to Foxhill House, and also form part of the School of Law, are separately listed as Grade II.

== History ==
The house was originally built in 1868 by the architect Alfred Waterhouse. In the early 1870s, his daughter Monica (later named Bridges) was brought up there. They moved into an even grander property, Yattendon Court, which he had built in 1881. In the early years of the 20th century, Foxhill was occupied by Rufus Isaacs, who was variously Member of Parliament for Reading, Lord Chief Justice of England, the British ambassador to the United States and Viceroy of India.

In 1919 Isaacs sold the lease to Hugo Hirst, founder of the General Electric Company Ltd, who in 1934 became Baron Hirst of Witton. Hirst lived in the house until his death in 1943. Subsequently, the house was used by his daughter, Muriel, and her husband Leslie Carr Gamage until about 1958 when the university gained possession.

Used for a period as student accommodation, Foxhill House was extensively restored between 2003 and 2005, in order to suit its new role as the home of the School of Law. In 2007 the courtyard of the building was refurbished with a grant from PriceWaterhouseCoopers in memory of Edwin Waterhouse, who was both a co-founder of that company and the brother of the building's architect.

Foxhill house was extended in 2009, in order to make room for more offices for academics and teaching staff. Several new teaching rooms were also created. The main extension was added between the main house and the stable block. The rear of the building was given something of a 'conservatory', which formed two new teaching rooms, as well as a small kitchen area. This element can be seen when looking at the house from the east.

== Gallery ==
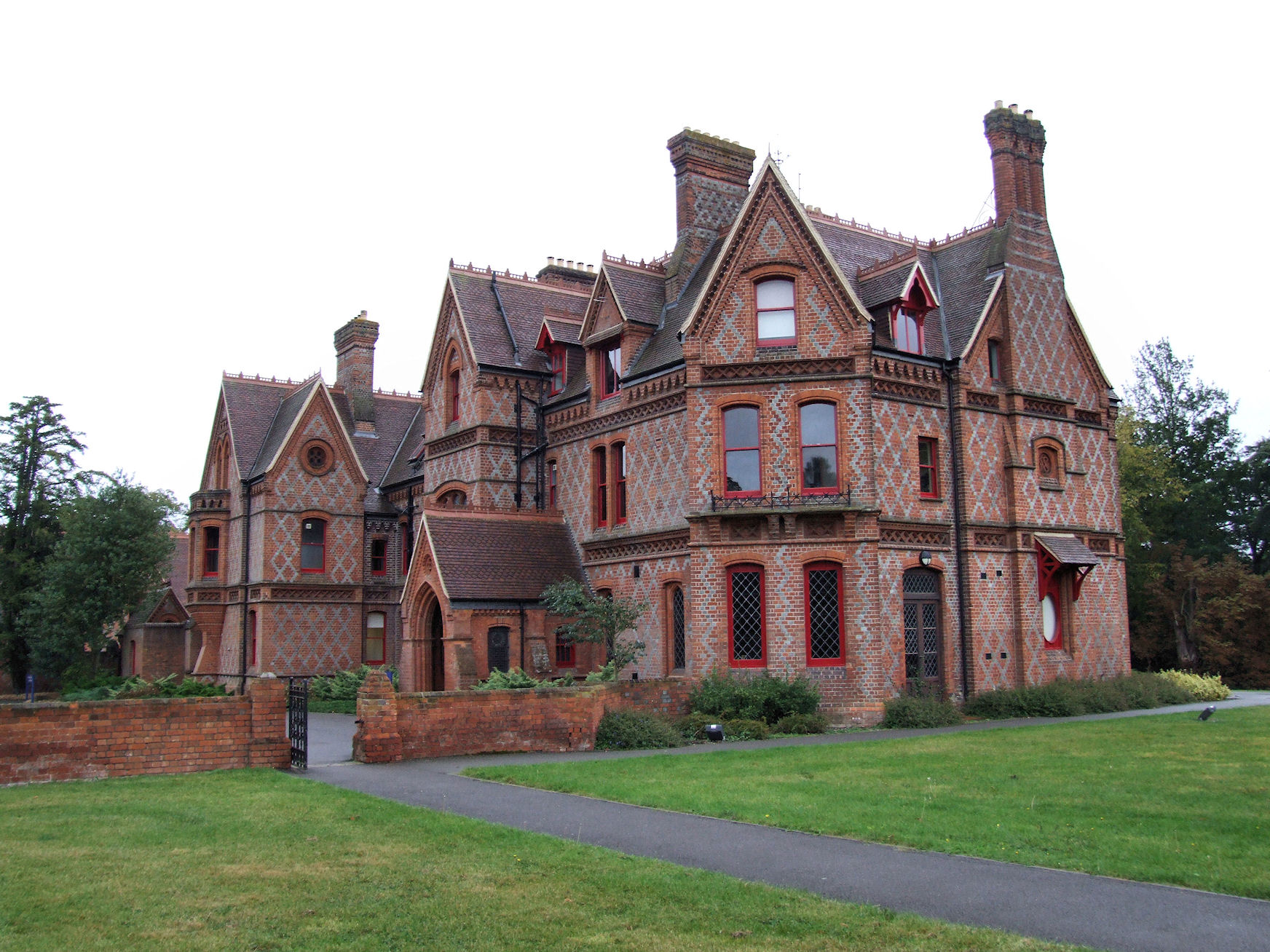
Foxhill House from the west

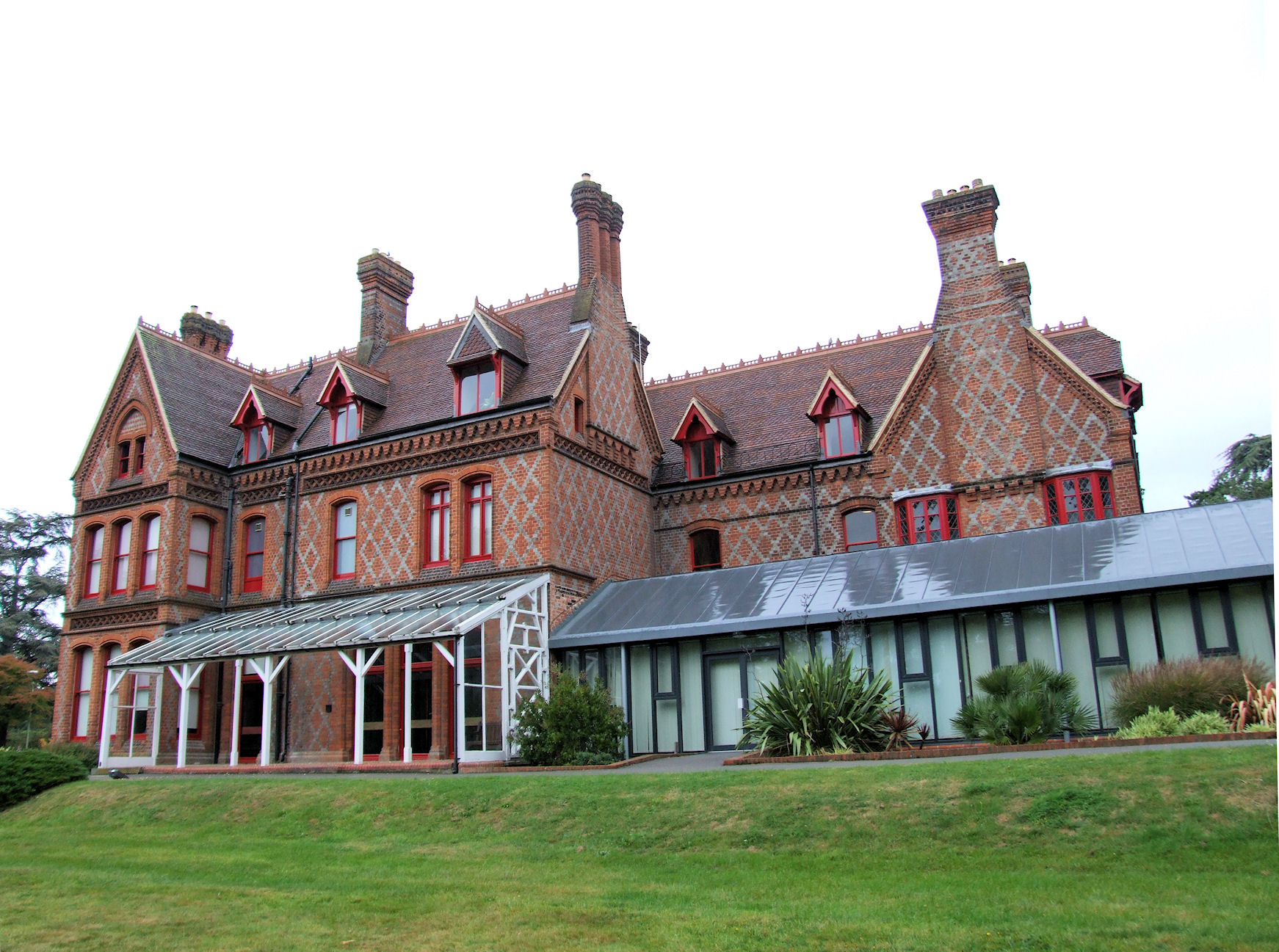
Foxhill House from the east

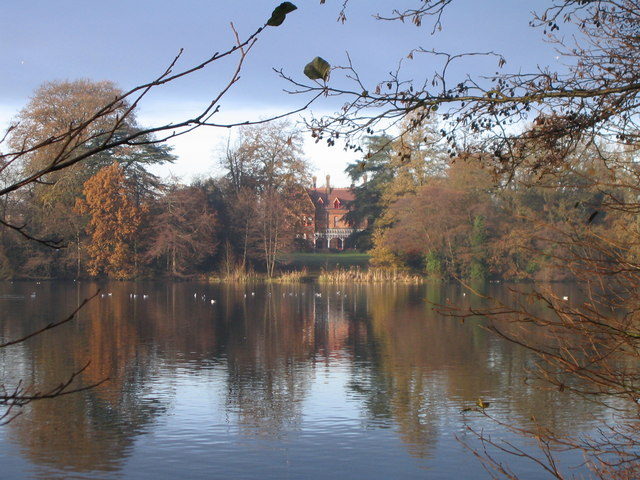
Foxhill from across the lake

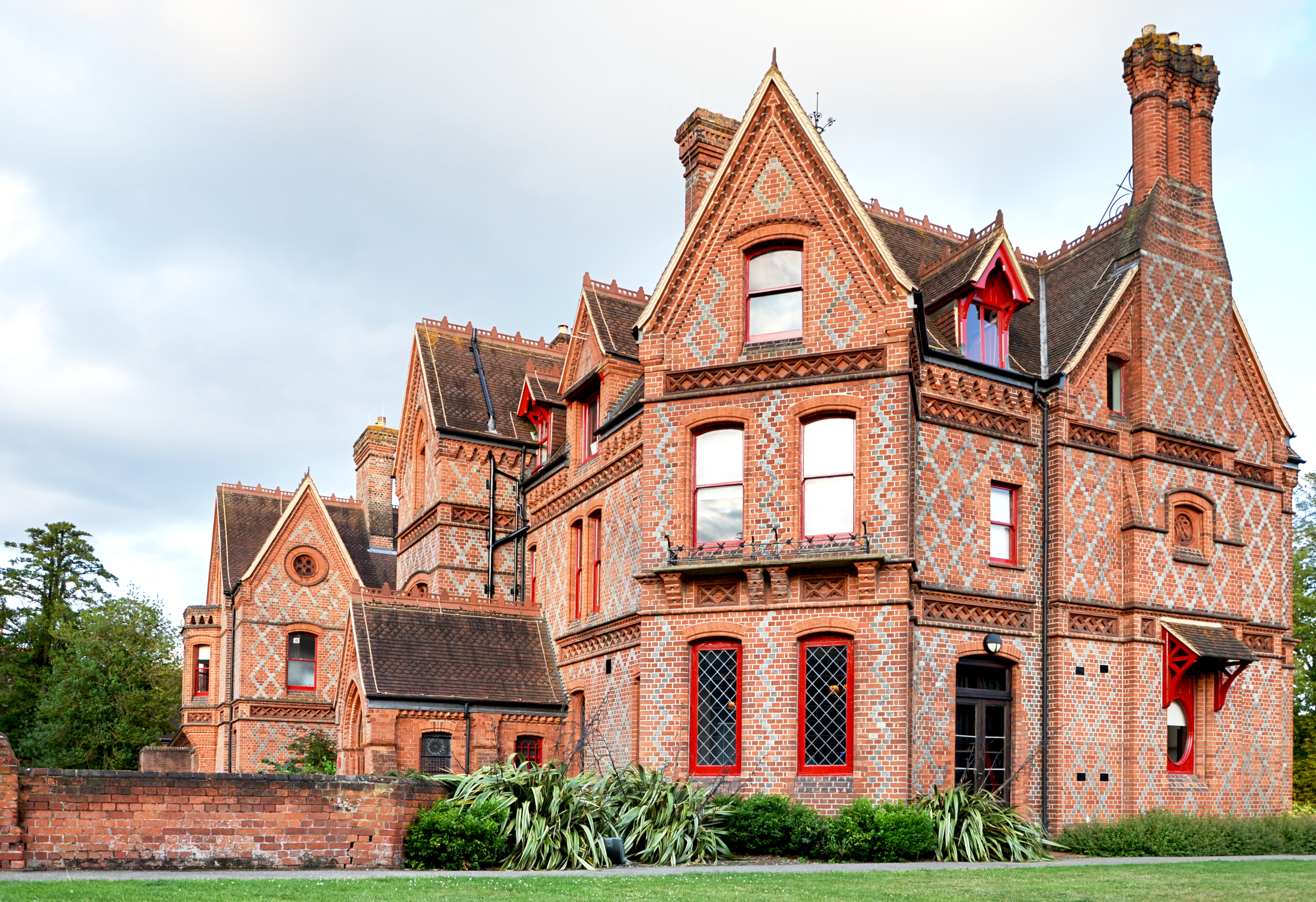
Foxhill House

== See also ==
- Grade II* listed buildings in Berkshire
