= Ernest Oppenheimer =

South African businessman (1880–1957)

Sir Ernest Oppenheimer KStJ
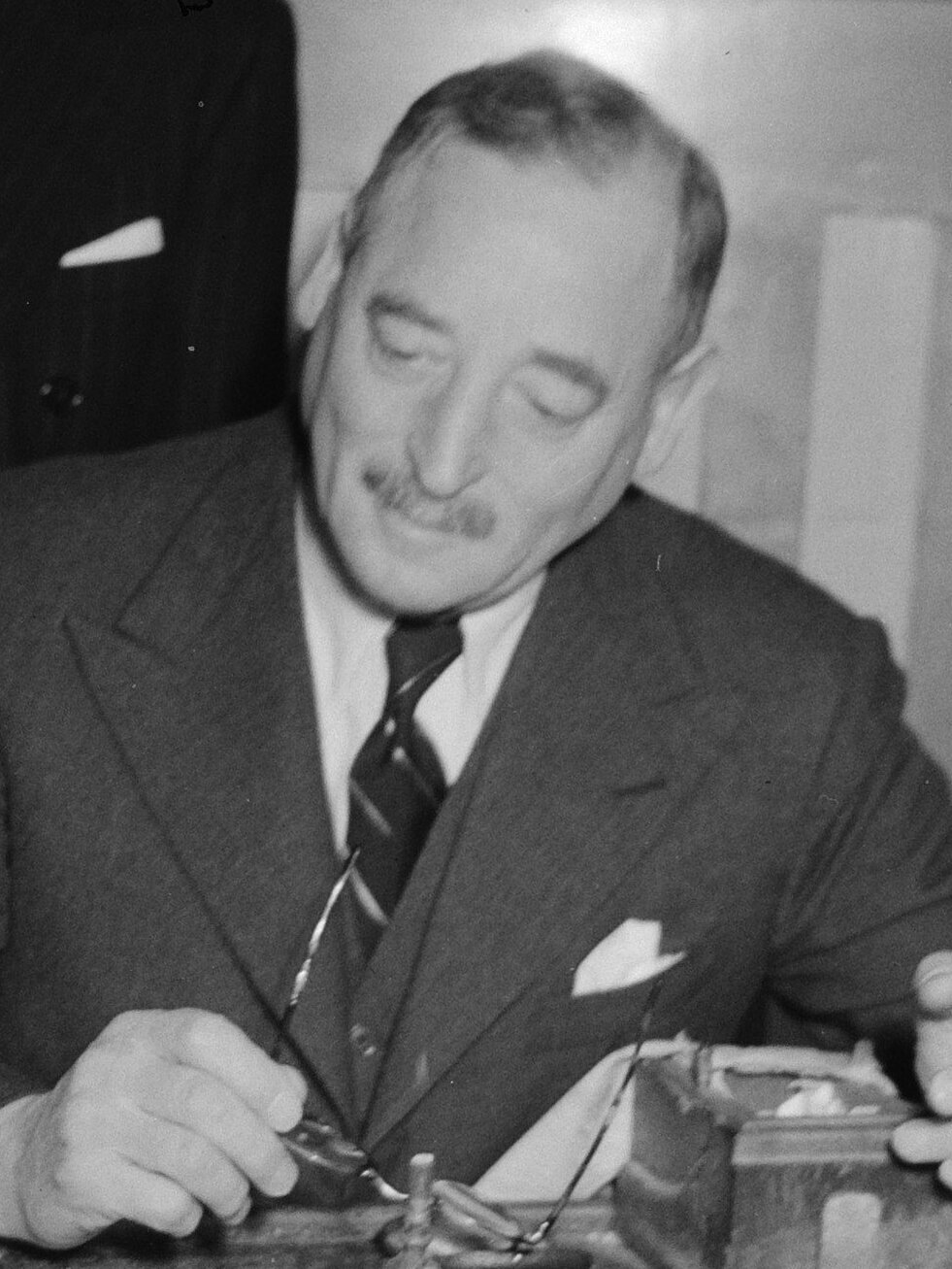
- Ernest Oppenheimer in 1945
- Born: 22 May 1880; Friedberg, Grand Duchy of Hesse, German Empire
- Died: 25 November 1957 (aged 77); Johannesburg, Transvaal, Union of South Africa
- Citizenship: South African citizenship
- Occupation: Entrepreneur
- Known for: Anglo American plc
- Spouses: Mary Lina Pollak; Caroline Magdalen Oppenheimer (née Harvey)
- Children: Frank Oppenheimer; Harry Oppenheimer
- Parents: Eduard Oppenheimer (father); Nanette Hirschhorn (mother)

Sir Ernest Oppenheimer KStJ (22 May 1880 – 25 November 1957) was a South African diamond and gold mining entrepreneur, financier and philanthropist, who controlled De Beers and founded the Anglo American Corporation in the Union of South Africa.

== Career ==
Ernest Oppenheimer was born in Friedberg, German Empire, to a German-Jewish family. He was the son of Edward Oppenheimer, a cigar merchant, and his wife, Nanette (née Hirschhorn) Oppenheimer. He began his working life at 17, when he entered Dunkelsbuhler & Company, a diamond brokerage in London. His efforts impressed his employer and in 1902, at the age of 22, he was sent to South Africa to represent the company as a buyer in Kimberley, of which he went on to become the mayor from 1912 to 1915. In this role, he helped raise the manpower for the Kimberley Regiment for service during World War I.

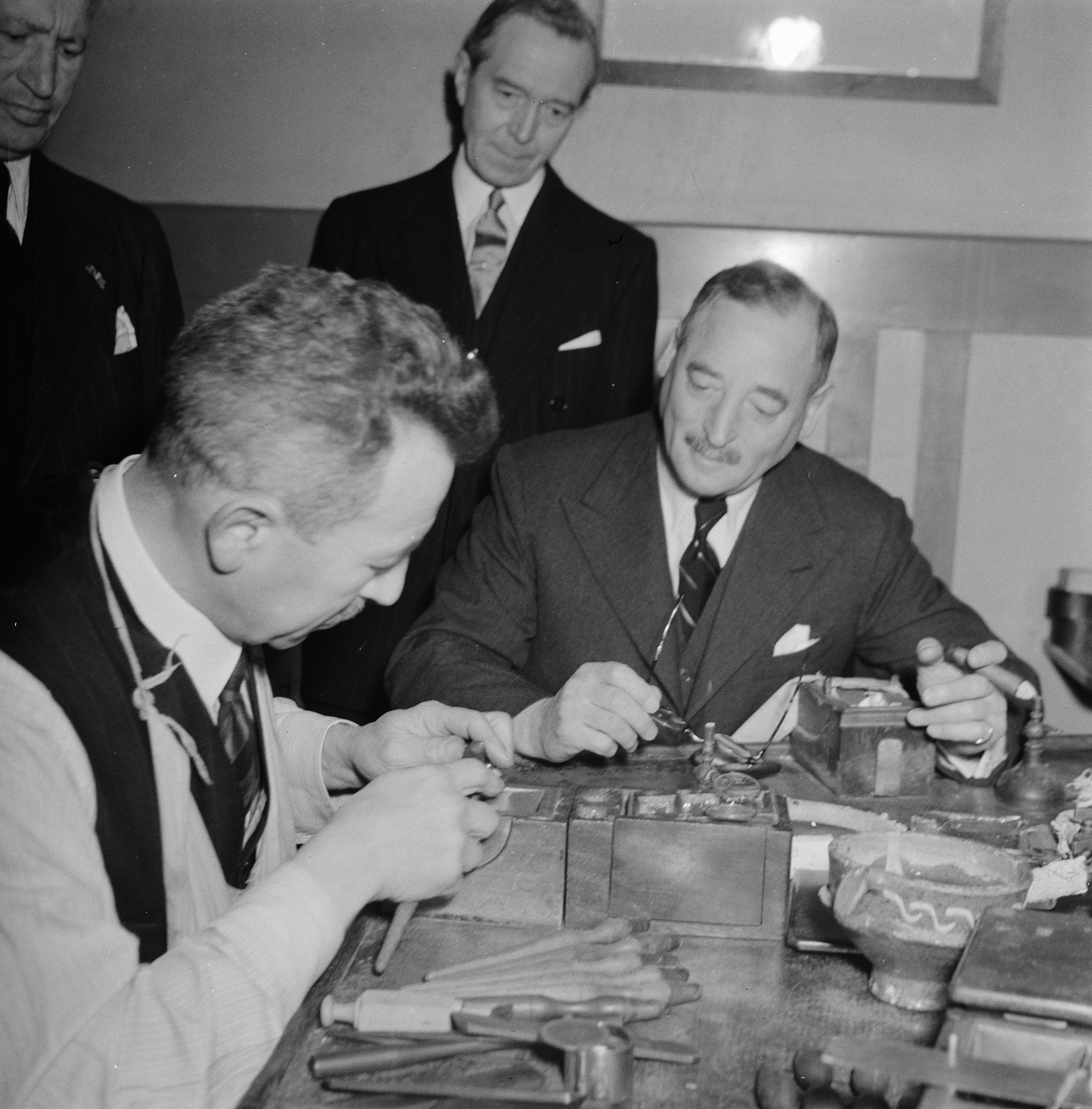
Ernest Oppenheimer (right) visiting an Amsterdam diamond factory, 3 December 1945

He became great friends with William Lincoln Honnold, an American engineer and chairman of Transvaal Coal Trust, Brakpan Mines, Springs Mines and The New Era Company. In 1917, they launched the Anglo American Corporation with financial assistance from J. P. Morgan. He was knighted in 1921. The initial capital was £1 million. Half of the capital was subscribed in the United States and half in the United Kingdom and South Africa. He would remain as a permanent director and its chairman until 1953. In 1919, two years after its launch, Anglo American purchased diamond mines in South West Africa, which would pose a challenge to the De Beers diamond business monopoly.

In the 1924 South African general election Oppenheimer stood for, and was elected to, the House of Assembly as the Member for Kimberley. He held the seat until 1938. In 1927, Oppenheimer managed to gain control of the late Cecil Rhodes' De Beers empire, building and consolidating the company's global monopoly over the world's diamond industry until his retirement. He gained the chairmanship of De Beers in 1929. Over the course of his chairmanship, Oppenheimer was involved in a number of controversies, including price fixing, antitrust behaviour, and an allegation of not releasing industrial diamonds for the U.S. war effort during the Second World War.

In 1952, he was appointed as a Knight of the Most Venerable Order of the Hospital of St John of Jerusalem.

== Personal life ==
Ernest Oppenheimer married Mary Lina Pollak in 1906 in a Jewish ceremony in London, with a marriage certificate issued by West London Synagogue, a prominent Reform synagogue. The couple had two sons.

In 1921, he was knighted for his role in the war. Therefore, he had the honorific title Sir.

Lady Oppenheimer died in 1934. The following year, he married Caroline Magdalen Oppenheimer (née Harvey), widow of Sir Michael, 2nd Baronet Oppenheimer of Stoke Poges.

He died in Johannesburg in 1957. Although he was born into a Jewish family, he converted to Anglicanism in adulthood. His ashes were interred in a niche of the columbarium at Parktown St George's Church, Parktown. He was succeeded in the business by his son, Harry Oppenheimer. Oppenheimer's brother, Sir Bernard Oppenheimer, was also heavily involved in the diamond industry, himself dying in 1921.

== Legacy ==
In 1964, the Oppenheimer Diamond was named in his honour by its owner, Harry Winston, who donated the stone (not a gem, as it remains uncut and unpolished) to the Smithsonian Institution as a memorial.

== See also ==
- Economy of South Africa
- Mining industry of South Africa
- Gustav Imroth
- Joel family
- Cecil Rhodes

Preceded by Cecil Rhodes	Chairman of De Beers Consolidated Mines circa 1925–1957	Succeeded by Harry Oppenheimer
