= Earley =

Town in Berkshire, England

Coordinates: 51°25′59″N 0°55′59″W

- Town and civil parish
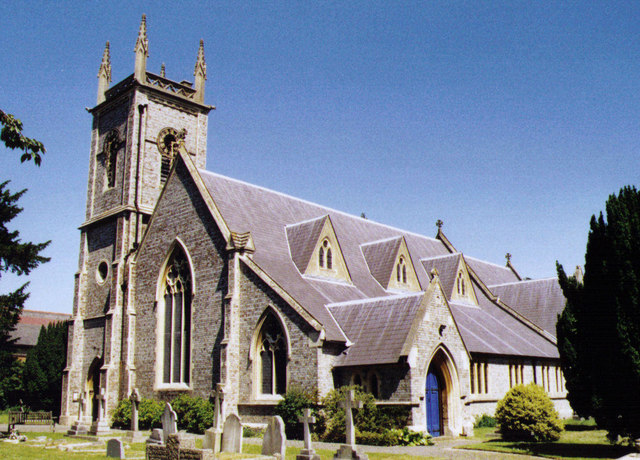
- St Peter's Church

- Location within Berkshire
- Interactive map of Earley
- Population: 32,036 (2001); 30,868 (2011 Census)
- OS grid reference: SU7571
- Civil parish: Earley
- Unitary authority: Wokingham
- Ceremonial county: Berkshire
- Region: South East
- Country: England
- Sovereign state: United Kingdom
- Post town: READING
- Postcode district: RG6
- Dialling code: 0118
- Police: Thames Valley
- Fire: Royal Berkshire
- Ambulance: South Central
- UK Parliament: Earley and Woodley

Earley (/ˈɜːrli/ UR-lee) is a town and civil parish in the Borough of Wokingham, Berkshire, England. Along with the neighbouring town of Woodley, the Office for National Statistics places Earley within the Reading/Wokingham Urban Area; for the purposes of local government it falls within the Borough of Wokingham, outside the area of Reading Borough Council. Its name is sometimes spelt Erleigh or Erlegh and consists of a number of smaller areas, including Maiden Erlegh and Lower Earley, and lies some 3 miles (5 km) south and east of the centre of Reading, and some 4 miles (6 km) northwest of Wokingham. It had a population of 32,036 at the 2011 Census.

The main campus of the University of Reading, Whiteknights Park, lies partly in Earley and partly in the borough of Reading.

== History ==
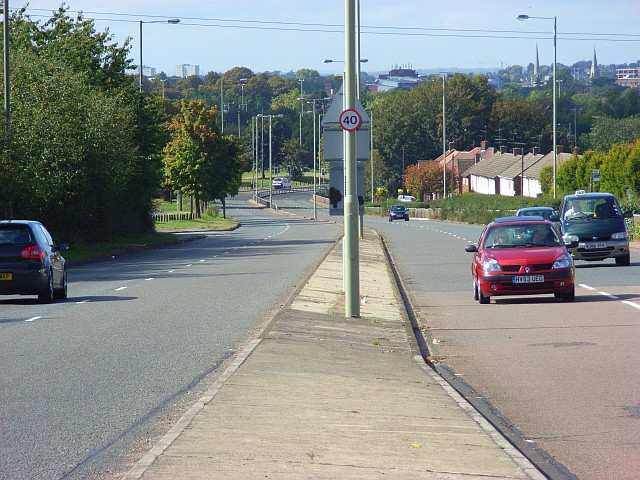
View down Shepherd's Hill (A4) towards Reading

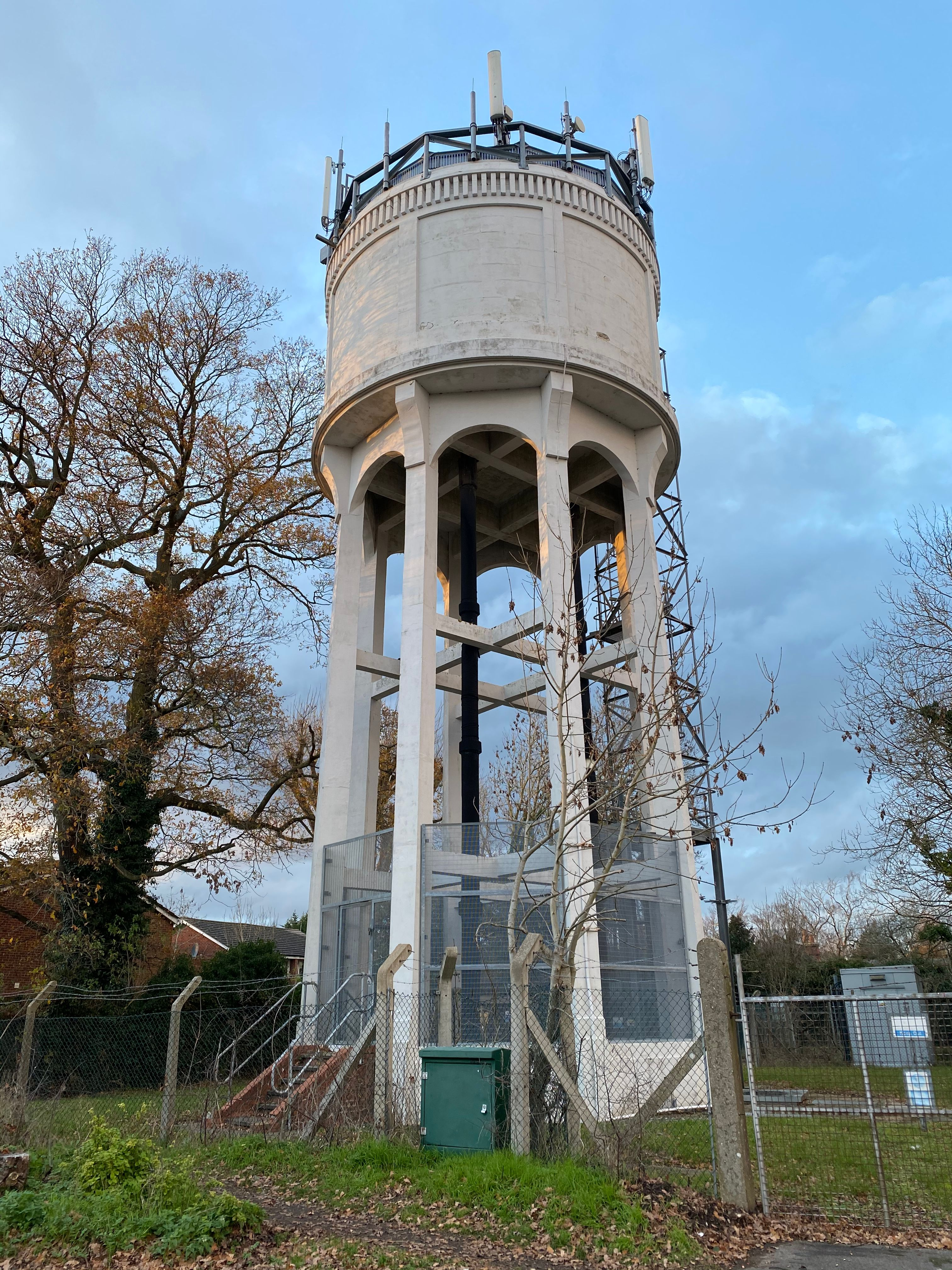
Local Landmark Lower Earley Water Tower

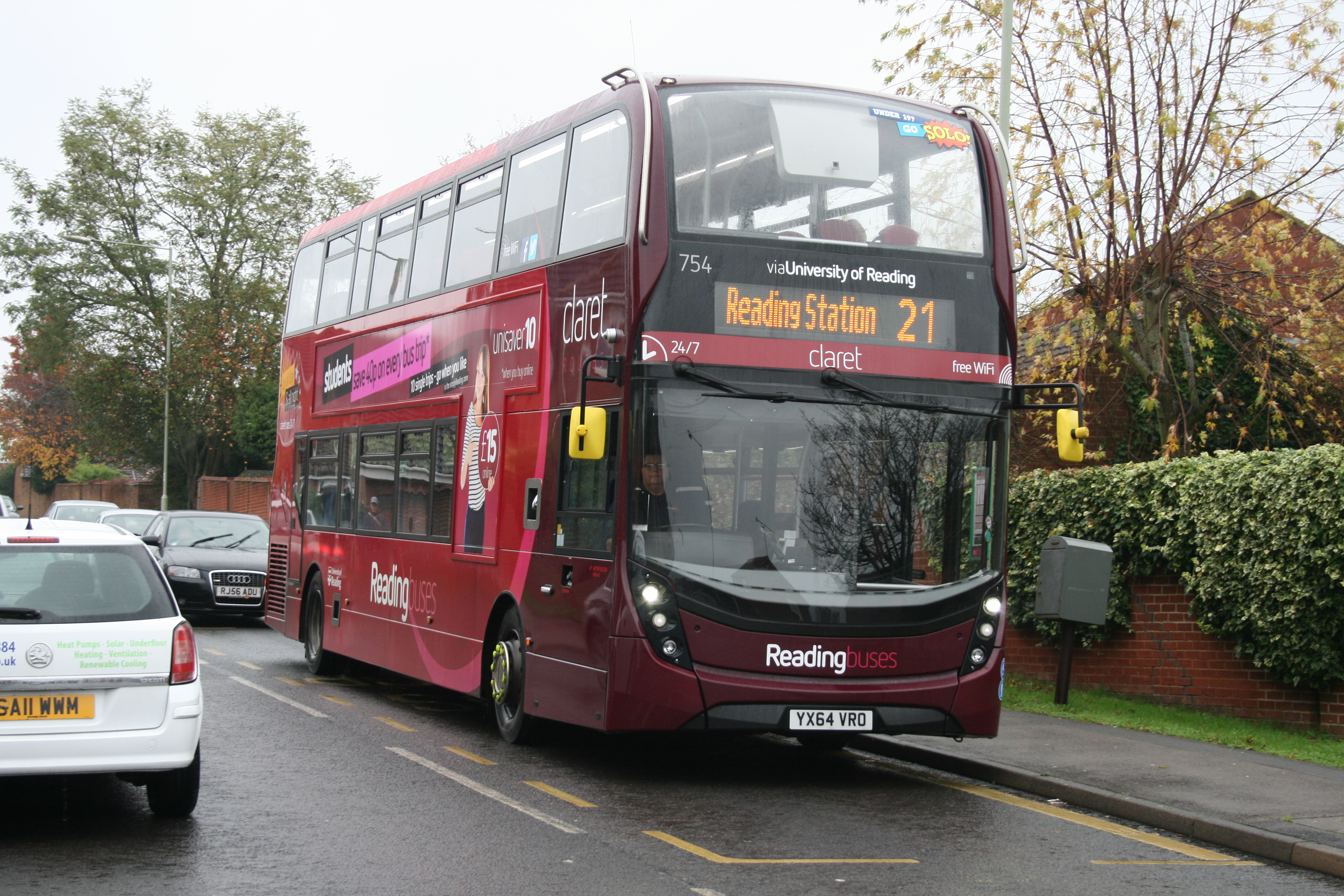
A Claret 21 service running towards Kilnsea Drive

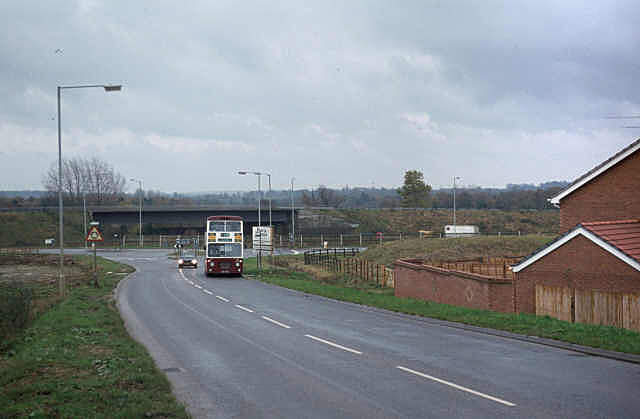
View down Beeston Way in 1982 during the development of Lower Earley

Evidence of prehistoric man has been found in locations around Earley. For example, a hand axe was found in the railway cutting; flint implements in a garden in Elm Lane; and hand axes in the gardens in Fowler Close and Silverdale Road. Most of these finds are thought to date from the late Paleolithic period, around 35,000 years ago. Traces of flimsy shelters from the Mesolithic were discovered at the site of the old power station at Thames Valley Park in north Earley. Tools from that time have also been found, including a flint blade found in a garden in Silverdale Road. Archaeological evidence for continued human presence during the Bronze Age and Iron Age was also discovered on the site of the Thames Valley Park, and Roman remains were found on a building site off Meadow Road.

The name Earley probably derives from the Old English earnlēah meaning 'eagle wood or clearing'. Another suggestion is that it derives from ēarlēah meaning 'gravel wood or clearing'.

Earley is mentioned in the Domesday Book as "Herlei", with two main manors: Erleigh St Bartholomew, later known as Erleigh Court; and Erleigh St Nicolas, later Erleigh White Knights. In Domesday Herlei is said to be "held by Osbern Giffard from the King, previously Dunn held it in alod of King Edward. [It was] then [assessed] at 5 hides; now at 2 hides. There is land for 7 ploughs. In demesne are 1 ½ ploughs; and 4 Villeins and 7 bordars with 2 ½ ploughs. There is 1 slave, and 2 fisheries rendering 68d, 20 acres of meadow [and] woodland for 30 pigs. The value was 100 shillings, later 60 shillings, now £4" The Erleghs, a family of knightly rank who took their name from the manors, held the manors of St Bartholemew and St Nicolas in the latter part of the 12th century through the 13th century and part of the 14th century. John de Erlegh (or John of Earley) was known as the White Knight, hence the renaming of the manor of Erleigh St Nicolas to Whiteknights. The Whiteknights estate was later owned by the Englefields, from 1606 to 1798, and then by the Marquis of Blandford, later the 5th Duke of Marlborough.

The manor of Maiden Erleigh was formed out of the manor of Erlegh, as a gift of land by John de Erlegh to Robert de Erlegh in 1368. Later it was transferred to Charles Hide of Abingdon. In 1673 the estate was sold to Valentine Crome, and after many changes of ownership at the end of the 18th century, it belonged to William Matthew Birt, who was Governor General of the Leeward Islands. In 1818 the property passed to the Rt Hon Edward Golding, MP for Downton in Wiltshire. /> In 1878 it was purchased by John Hargreaves, Master of the South Berks Hunt, who created a course where hunt and yeomanry races, similar to modern hunter chases, were run.

The course extended over an area now covered by Sutcliffe Avenue, Hillside Road and Mill Lane. The grandstand stood on an area opposite Loddon Infant School. The estate was purchased in 1903 by the millionaire Solly Joel who had a racecourse on the estate. The racecourse was demolished during the First World War and the grandstand was re-erected at Newbury Racecourse. Joel donated a piece of his land to the village to be used for sporting purposes: the park and pavilion were opened by the Duke of York, later George VI, as Sol Joel Park in 1927.

Earley's boundaries historically extended further north-west towards Reading along the Wokingham Road as far as Cemetery Junction, and included the Newtown area between London Road and the River Kennet. In September 1887 the part of Earley north-west of a new boundary drawn along Whiteknights Road, Wilderness Road, Church Road and the South Eastern Railway was incorporated into the borough of Reading. This area included much of the then main village of Earley around the Three Tuns crossroads, but excluded the village school and the parish church of St Peter on the opposite side of Church Road. The civil parish boundary was adjusted to match the new borough boundary eighteen months later in March 1889, with the part of Earley in the borough of Reading being transferred to the civil parish of Reading St Giles. Ecclesiastical parish boundaries were unaffected by the civil parish and borough boundary changes, and much of the area transferred to the borough of Reading in 1887 still forms part of the ecclesiastical parish of Earley St Peter, which today extends as far as, but does not include, Palmer Park.

The University of Reading began as the University College, Reading, an extension of Oxford University in 1892; it became a university in its own right in 1926 and acquired its new site, which straddles the boundary between Earley and Reading, in 1947. Of the six large villas on the estate four were designed by Alfred Waterhouse (Erleigh Park 1859, Whiteknights 1868 (now called Old Whiteknights House), Foxhill 1868 and the Wilderness 1873). Waterhouse also designed Reading School (1865–71) in Erleigh Road, in the borough of Reading, extended Pepper Manor, now 'Old School' in Leighton Park School, on Shinfield Road, in 1890, and built Grove House on the north of the school site (1892–94).

Earley established its own branch of the Women's Institute, Earley WI, in 1938 to enable women in the local area to come together and develop skills, further their education, and improve the local community. Earley grew rapidly both before and after World War II, and was designated a town in 1974. From 1977, the Lower Earley housing estate was constructed by private companies, almost doubling Earley's population to the current level. Two new primary schools were built, together with a large supermarket complex, which opened in 1979, and a sports centre. In 1988 a second shopping area, Maiden Place, opened. An additional secondary school was planned roughly opposite the sports centre next to Rushey Way, possibly on the site next to the police station. However, the school never materialised, and the land was built on.

=== Listed buildings ===
Despite its generally 19th- and 20th-century appearance, Earley has some remnants of its older past hidden in amongst the newer development. The following buildings in Earley Town are currently listed by English Heritage as being of special architectural or historic interest (all are listed as Grade II except for Foxhill House):

On Whiteknights Campus

- Landscape garden feature, Whiteknights Park – early C19;
- North Lodge, Whiteknights Road – early C19 gate lodge;
- South Lodge, Whiteknights Road – early C19 gate lodge;
- Foxhill House, Whiteknights Park – 1868 large house in red brick diaper pattern, now the School of Law (formerly a students' hall of residence) (Listed Grade II*);
- Former stables and coach house immediately north east of Foxhill House, Whiteknights Park (now also part of the School of Law);
- The Lodge, Whiteknights Road – 1868 red brick lodge to Foxhill;
- Blandford Lodge, Chancellors Way, Whiteknights Park – late C19 (1870s?) grey brick;
- Reading War Room ('The Citadel'), University of Reading, Whiteknights – 1953 concrete war room;

Elsewhere in Earley

- Rushy Mead, Cutbush Close – late C16 timber-framed house altered in C19 and C20;
- Radstock Cottage, 1 Radstock Lane – early C17 timber-framed cottage altered and extended in mid C20;
- Sindlesham Farmhouse – early C18 altered C20, brick rendered and painted;
- The George Inn, Loddon Bridge Road – C18 inn now public house;
- 25 Church Road – 1820s cottage red and grey chequered brick;
- Church of St Peter, Church Road – c.1844 grey vitreous brick, aisles and chancel added 1882–83;
- Bridge at Sindlesham Mill – mid C19 road bridge over mill stream;
- Sindlesham Mill, Mill Lane – mid C19 watermill now restaurant and club;

== Geography ==
Earley is bordered by the B3270, Lower Earley] Way, to the south and south-east; the boundary then follows the Reading-Waterloo railway line until it turns north to run to the east of the B3350 (Church Road and Pitts Lane) as far as the gyratory system where the B3350 joins the A4; the boundary then runs north to the River Thames. The boundary then runs upstream along the Thames as far as the River Kennet, then follows the Reading-Waterloo railway line again, until it meets the B3350; it then runs north-west along Whiteknights Road, cuts irregularly across the University of Reading Whiteknights Campus, and then runs to the east of the A327 (Shinfield Road) until it meets up again with the B3270. The extension of the Reading borough boundaries in 1888 had the result that the section of Earley lying to the north of the railway line (sometimes referred to as Old Earley or North Earley) is connected to the larger part to the south by only a narrow corridor of land. The Borough of Reading lies to the west, the River Thames to the north-west, Woodley to the north-east, Winnersh to the east, and Arborfield and Shinfield to the south.

Lower Earley is often spoken of as a town in its own right, but it is just a development at the southern end of the town. The name Lower Earley is however very old, having originally been applied to the low-lying land between the old Maiden Erlegh Estate and the River Loddon which runs along the eastern edge of the borough.

== Governance ==
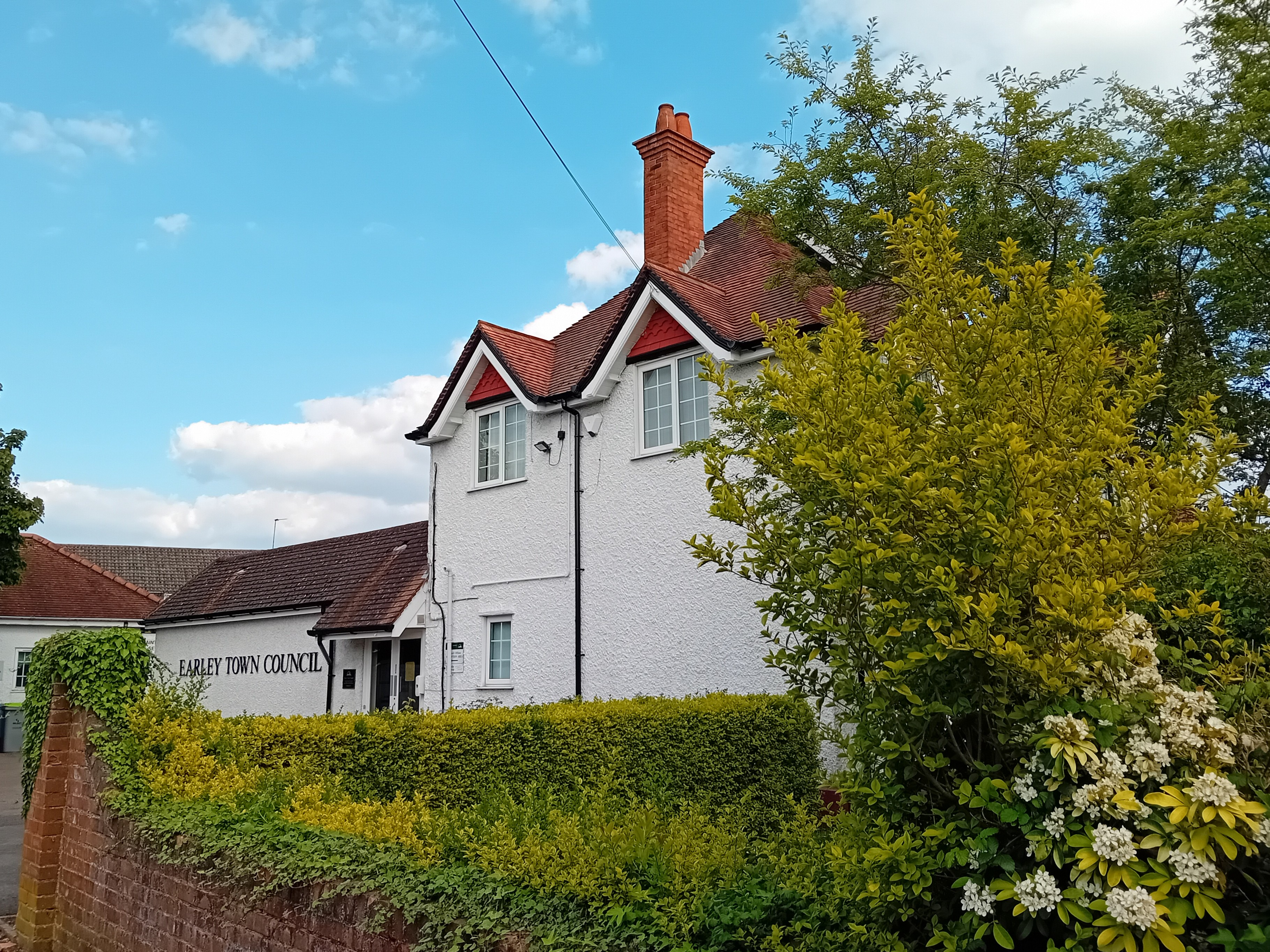
Radstock House, offices of Earley Town Council

As of 2024, Earley is in the new parliamentary constituency of Earley and Woodley. It was previously part of the Wokingham constituency, except for the Whitegates Town Ward, comprising the part of Earley lying north of the Reading-Waterloo railway line, which was in Reading East.

Earley was originally a liberty in the parish of Sonning. It became an independent ecclesiastical parish in 1854 and later a civil parish. Earley has two levels of local government: Earley Town Council, created from the former Parish Council in 1974, based at Radstock House in Radstock Lane, and Wokingham Borough Council based at Shute End in Wokingham. There are 25 councillors representing eight wards on the Town Council and 12 Borough Councillors (out of 54 on the Borough Council) representing four Earley wards (Hillside; Hawkedon; Maiden Erlegh; and Bulmershe and Whitegates). The Bulmershe and Whitegates ward also includes the Bulmershe ward of Woodley Town Council. The Town Wards do not coincide with the Borough Wards: Cutbush and Hawkedon Town Wards make up the Hawkedon Borough Ward; Hillside and Radstock the Hillside Borough Ward; Redhatch, St Nicolas and Maiden Erlegh the Maiden Erlegh Borough ward; and Whitegates together with the Woodley Town Ward of Bulmershe make up the Bulmershe and Whitegates Borough Ward. Town Council elections are held every four years; the last one was in 2023. Borough Elections are held by thirds with one in 3 years out of every 4 for the three member wards and one year with no election.

== Amenities ==
Earley town council runs Sol Joel Park, leased from Reading Borough Council for 50 years, Meadow Park off Meadow Road, Bulmershe Park (jointly with Woodley), the BMX track near Paddick Drive which was opened in 2011, two community centres and Maiden Erlegh Lakes, which was declared a local nature reserve in 1997. The council has a large allotment at Culver Lane and a lawn cemetery at Mays Lane. The council also provides the bus shelters at the main Reading bound stops. Within Earley, the council operates the Waterside Centre, a canoe centre in Thames Valley Park, and the Loddon Valley Leisure Centre. They also own Chalfont Park and Laurel Park in Earley, both of which include football pitches.

Even after its recent development, Earley has some remnants of ancient woodland within its boundaries, including Pearman's Copse and Redhatch Copse.

== Transport ==
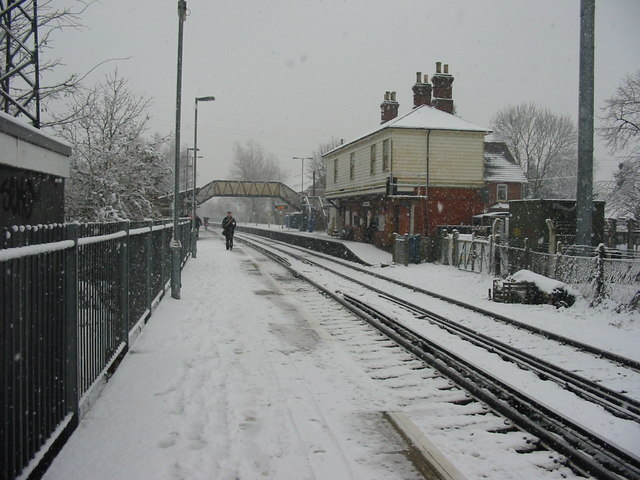
Earley railway station

Earley railway station is on the line from Reading to London Waterloo. Winnersh Triangle railway station, which opened in 1986, is also near Earley. Earley is served by Reading Buses who provide a number of bus services to and from the centre of Reading, namely the 4, X4, 19a, 19b, 19c; and the 21, a 24-hour service. The 17 bus runs 24 hours a day from the junction at the Three Tuns, through Reading town centre, towards Tilehurst. Wokingham can be reached by bus on the Wokingham Road or by train from Earley or Winnersh Triangle stations. Earley is to the north of the M4 motorway which connects London with Bristol.

== Economy ==
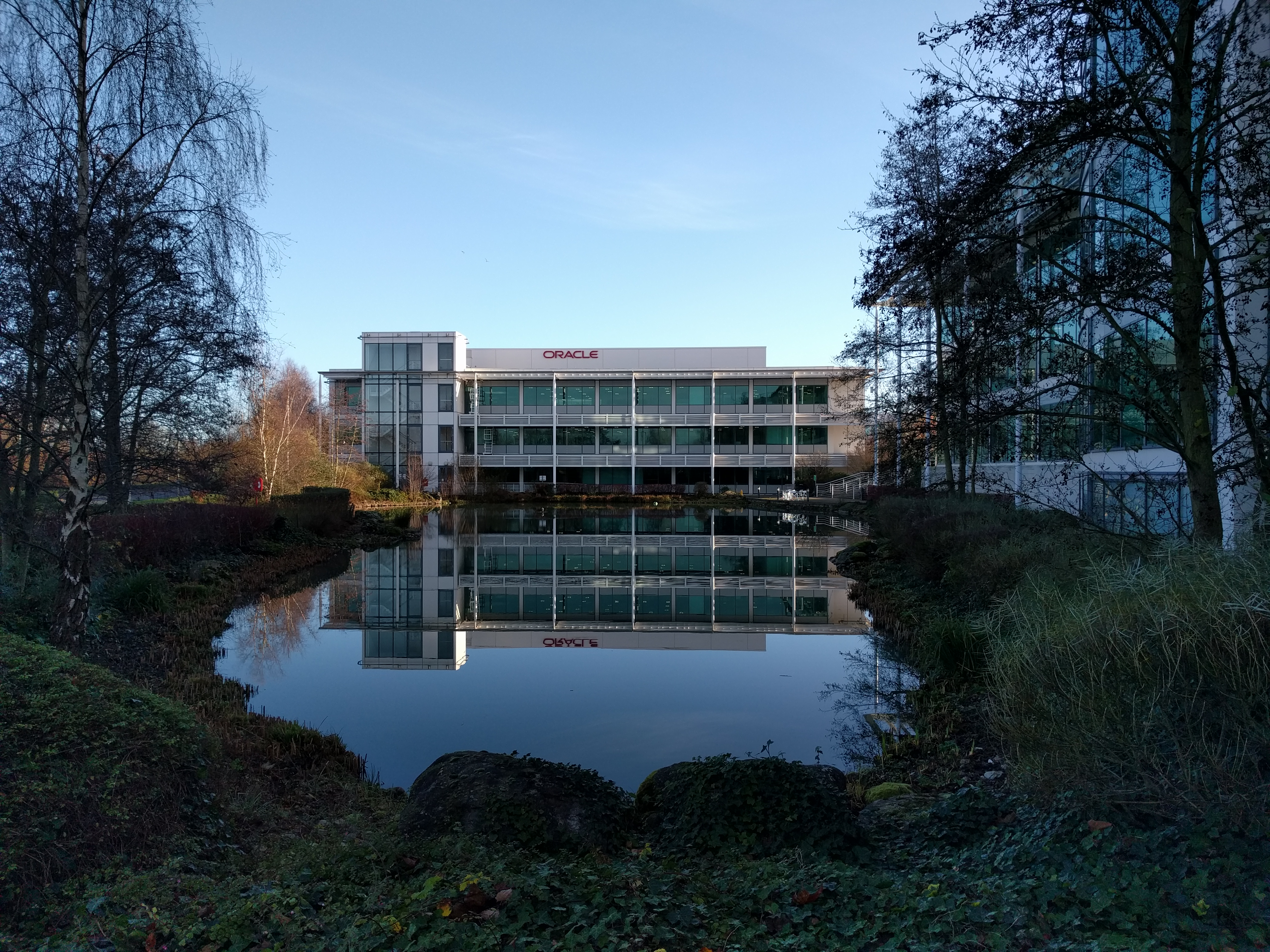
Thames Valley Park

Earley is home to the Thames Valley Park which is alongside the Thames to the east of the A329(M) motorway. The park houses offices of many major companies including the UK headquarters of BG Group, Microsoft, ING Direct and SGI together with offices of Oracle Corporation, Computacenter, David Lloyd Leisure, Cybersource, JP Executive Recruitment, Open Text, Regus, Websense and Worktube CV. The neighbouring Suttons Business Park houses more service and high tech companies such as Rentokil Initial, Service Point, HP Invent, MOOG, FPS and Royal Mail. One of the main industries located in Earley was Sutton Seeds, whose headquarters were in London Road, at the northern end of what was once the A329(M) motorway spur (now the A3290). The building was partly taken over by the civil engineering consultancy Sir Alexander Gibb & Partners in June 1974, when it relocated from London. Sutton Seeds finally departed in 1975 to its new base in Torquay.

Earley was selected by the Central Electricity Board as the site of an innovative power station to provide electricity in support of the war effort which was commissioned in 1942. It was also the site of a pioneering main-service gas turbine electricity generator, this was a 56 MW machine driven by four Rolls-Royce Avon jet engines and was commissioned in 1965. See Central Electricity Board.

== Education ==
Earley has 6 primary schools, Aldryngton, Earley St Peters, Hillside, Radstock, Whiteknights and Hawkedon, and Maiden Erlegh School, a coeducational secondary school. In addition, the following schools all have children from Earley and Lower Earley within their designated catchment areas, as defined by Wokingham Borough Council: The Emmbrook School, Forest School, The Holt School and The Piggott School.

== Religion ==
The parish church is Earley St Peter's in Church Road. Trinity church in Chalfont Close is a partnership between the Methodist, United Reformed and Anglican churches. St Nicholas is another Anglican church in Sutcliffe Avenue. The Baptist church is in Maiden Place in Lower Earley. The Roman Catholic church of Our Lady of Peace & Blessed Dominic Barberi is on the Wokingham Road. The Aisha Masjid mosque & Islamic Centre is on London Road, the Jamia Masjid mosque is on Alexandra Road and the Jamiat Ahl-e-Hadith and Sri Guru Singh Sabha Gurdwara are on Cumberland Road.

== Notable people ==
- Henry Addington, Viscount Sidmouth (1757–1844); Speaker 1789, Prime Minister 1801, donated land for and endowed Earley St Peters Church, owned Erleigh Court)
- The Marquis of Blandford, later George Spencer-Churchill, 5th Duke of Marlborough acquired the Whiteknights estate in 1798.
- Owen Buckingham, Lord Mayor of London; owner of Erlegh Court from 1708 to 1720
- John of Earley or de Erleigh (fl. 1180–1215), squire to William Marshal, knight in the courts of Henry II and Richard I
- Francis Goldsmid, 2nd Baronet (1808–1878); first Jewish Barrister and QC, MP for Reading, owner of Whiteknights.
- Isaac Goldsmid, 1st Baronet (1778–1859); financier, owner of Whiteknights Estate, first Jewish Baronet.
- Baron Hirst (1863–1943); lived at Foxhill House. With Gustav Byng, he founded a company selling electrical appliances, the forerunner of GEC, Hirst was MD of GEC in 1900 and chairman in 1910.
- Rufus Isaacs, 1st Marquess of Reading (1860–1935), MP and diplomat, lived at Foxhill House during the early years of the 20th Century, until 1919.
- Solomon Joel (1865–1931); businessman, was the owner of Maiden Erlegh estate from 1903.
- General Sir Richard Denis Kelly (1815–1897); lived at 'Shrublands' in Earley, and is buried in St Peter's Churchyard Earley)
- William Scott, 1st Baron Stowell (1745–1836); Tory; MP for Oxford University, lived at Erleigh Court from 1828 until his death on 28 Jan 1836.
- Alfred Waterhouse (1813–1905); architect, designer and owner of Foxhill House, first chairman of Governors at Leighton Park School, designed Wokingham and Reading Town Halls.
