= Maiden Erlegh Lakes =

Nature reserve in Berkshire, England

Coordinates: 51°26′02″N 0°55′16″W

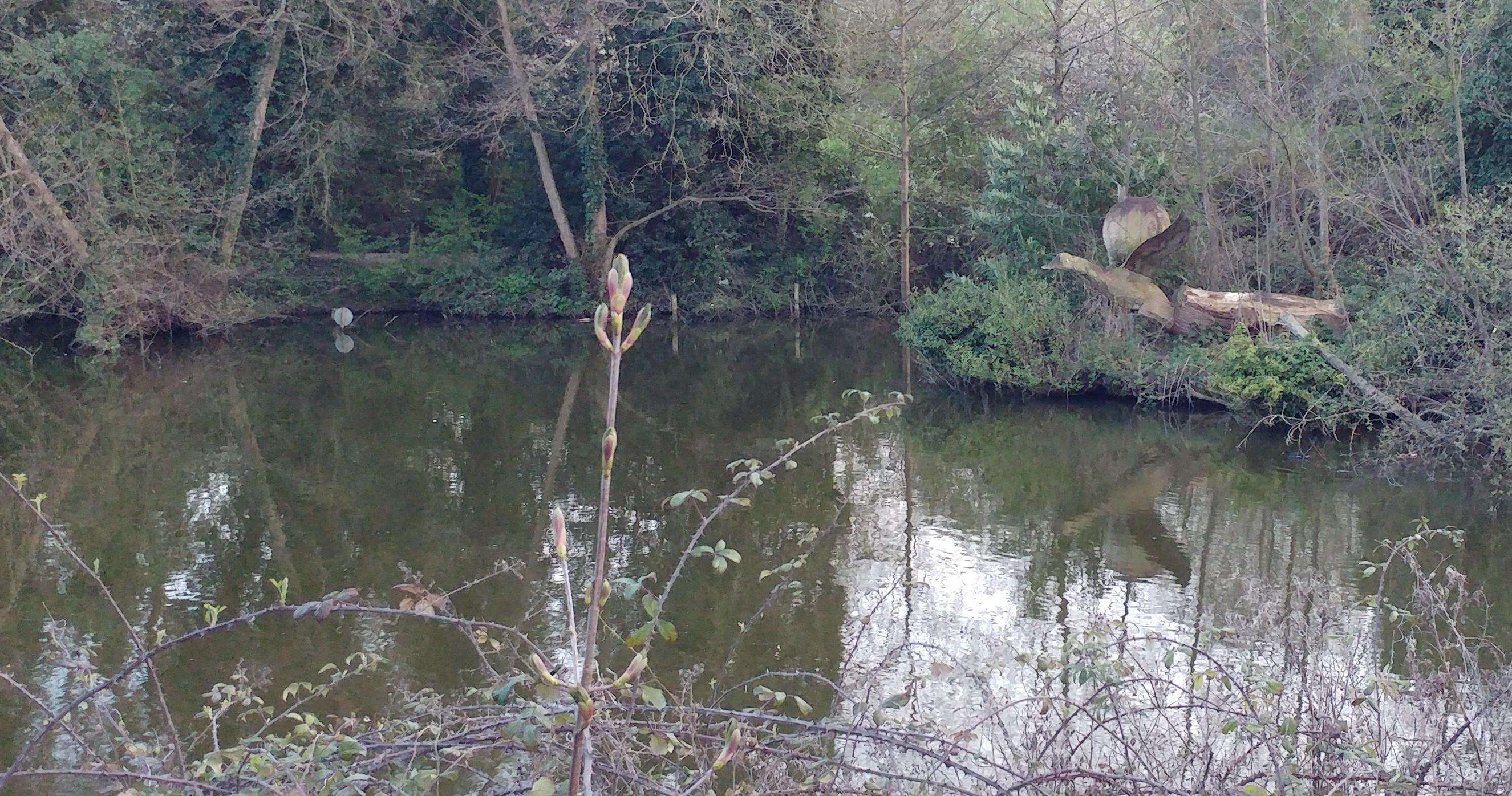
- The Duck and the World wooden sculpture
- Interactive map of Maiden Erlegh Lakes
- Type: Local Nature Reserve
- Location: Earley, Berkshire
- OS grid: SU 749 710
- Area: 10.2 hectares (25 acres)
- Manager: Earley Town Council

Maiden Erlegh Lakes is a 10.2-hectare (25-acre) Local Nature Reserve Earley, a suburb of Reading in Berkshire. It is owned and managed by Earley Town Council.

== Geography and site ==
The nature reserve consists of areas of ancient and secondary woodland, grassland, a large lake, a brook, an old woodland pond and surrounding wetland habitat. The reserve supports a large amount of wildlife including over 100 species of butterflies and moths, more than 50 species of birds, 50 species of fungi and over 20 species of trees. The site features a lake which is 2.4 hectares in area and up to 2 meters deep. The lake features two islands, which birds use as nesting places.

The reserve features woodlands that contain a small pond which is the last remaining remnant of a second lake that used to occupy much of this copse area. On the south side of the lake is more woodland, plus a wildflower meadow and butterfly garden.

=== Features ===
On the island within the lake known as Swan Island a statue made out of a tree that had fallen in 2007 was revealed to the public in 2009.

== History ==
The area of the reserve called Oak Wood dates from at least the 16th century and contains some 18 indicator species associated with old woodlands. The lake area which was once a wet woodland is believed to have been created, by damming the area, sometime between the Middle Ages to the 18th century to create fishponds, provide ice and create a landscape feature.

In the late 18th century, Maiden Erlegh was owned by slaveholder and MP William Mathew Burt, who recruited Capability Brown to assist with landscape planning.

The 1820 maps of enclosures and the tithe map of 1844 both show the woodlands and lake, within Maiden Erlegh Park, as being almost the same size and shape as today.

The lake and surrounding site was purchased by Solomon Joel in 1903, where it is believed he had the larger of the two islands in the lake created.

In response to the demands of local residents Coopers Estates agreed to sell Maiden Erlegh Lake and the surrounding woodland to Earley Parish Council in return for being allowed to build on another greenfield site in 1965 for a sum of £8,500. The land sold in 1965 consisted of the lake itself, plus Oakwood, Old Pond Copse and a small part of Moor Copse. In 1991 Old Lane Wood was acquired from Wokingham Borough Council for £1.

In 1996 the area was then declared a local nature reserve by Earley Town Council.

== Fauna ==
The site has the following fauna:

=== Reptiles and amphibians ===
- Common frog
- Common toad
- Smooth newt

=== Invertebrates ===
- Clouded yellow
- Polygonia c-album
- Brimstone moth
- Common blue
- Gatekeeper
- Common hawker
- Green-veined white
- Holly blue
- Large white
- Meadow brown
- Anthocharis cardamines
- Painted lady
- Aglais io
- Purple hairstreak
- Vanessa atalanta
- Satyrini
- Lycaena phlaeas
- Small tortoiseshell
- Pieris rapae
- Speckled wood
- White clawed crayfish
- Stag beetle
- Lasius flavus
- Lasius niger
- Gammarus
- Asellus aquaticus
- Armadillidium vulgare
- Armadillidium nasatum
- Porcellio scaber

=== Birds ===
- Common blackbird
- Eurasian bullfinch
- Carrion crow
- Common chaffinch
- red junglefowl
- Common chiffchaff
- Coal tit
- Eurasian collared dove
- Dunnock
- Fieldfare
- Goldcrest
- European goldfinch
- Great spotted woodpecker
- Great tit
- European greenfinch
- European green woodpecker
- House sparrow
- Western jackdaw
- Jay
- Lesser spotted woodpecker
- Long-tailed tit
- Eurasian magpie
- Mistle thrush
- Eurasian nuthatch
- Pied wagtail
- Redwing
- European robin
- Eurasian siskin
- Song thrush
- Eurasian sparrowhawk
- Common starling
- Tawny owl
- Eurasian treecreeper
- Willow warbler
- Common wood pigeon
- Eurasian wren
- Mallard
- Aylesbury duck
- Coot
- Moorhen
- Mandarin duck
- Wood duck
- Shelduck
- Tufted duck
- Mute swan
- Canada goose
- Egyptian goose
- Greylag goose
- Great cormorant
- Great crested grebe
- Common kingfisher
- Grey heron
- European Herring Gull
- Black-headed gull
- Common tern
- Grey wagtail

=== Mammals ===
- Bank vole
- Brown rat
- Common shrew
- Field vole
- Red fox
- Eastern gray squirrel
- Hedgehog
- House mouse
- Mink
- Mole
- Muntjac
- Wood mouse
- Daubenton's bat
- Common noctule
- Pipistrellus

=== Fish ===
- Common carp
- Northern pike
- Tench
- Common roach
- Common rudd
- Gobio gobio
- European perch
- European chub

== Flora ==
The site has the following flora:

=== Trees ===
- Alder
- Fraxinus
- Fagus sylvatica
- Tilia × europaea
- Quercus robur
- Salix fragilis
- Ulmus minor 'Atinia'
- Populus × canescens
- Hornbeam
- Ulmus glabra
- Taxus baccata
- Acer campestre
- Ilex aquifolium
- Sorbus aucuparia
- Betula pendula
- Sorbus anglica
- Prunus avium
- Sorbus torminalis
- Frangula alnus
- Prunus spinosa
- Malus sylvestris
- Sambucus
- Salix atrocinerea
- Crataegus
- Corylus avellana
- Rhamnus cathartica
- Pussy willow
- Ligustrum vulgare
- Quercus ilex
- Castanea sativa
- Platanus orientalis
- Salix babylonica

=== Plants ===
- Hyacinthoides non-scripta
- Anemone nemorosa
- Caltha palustris
- Yellow loosestrife
- Chrysosplenium oppositifolium
- Lythrum salicaria
- Iris pseudacorus
- Filipendula ulmaria
