= Consolidated Building =

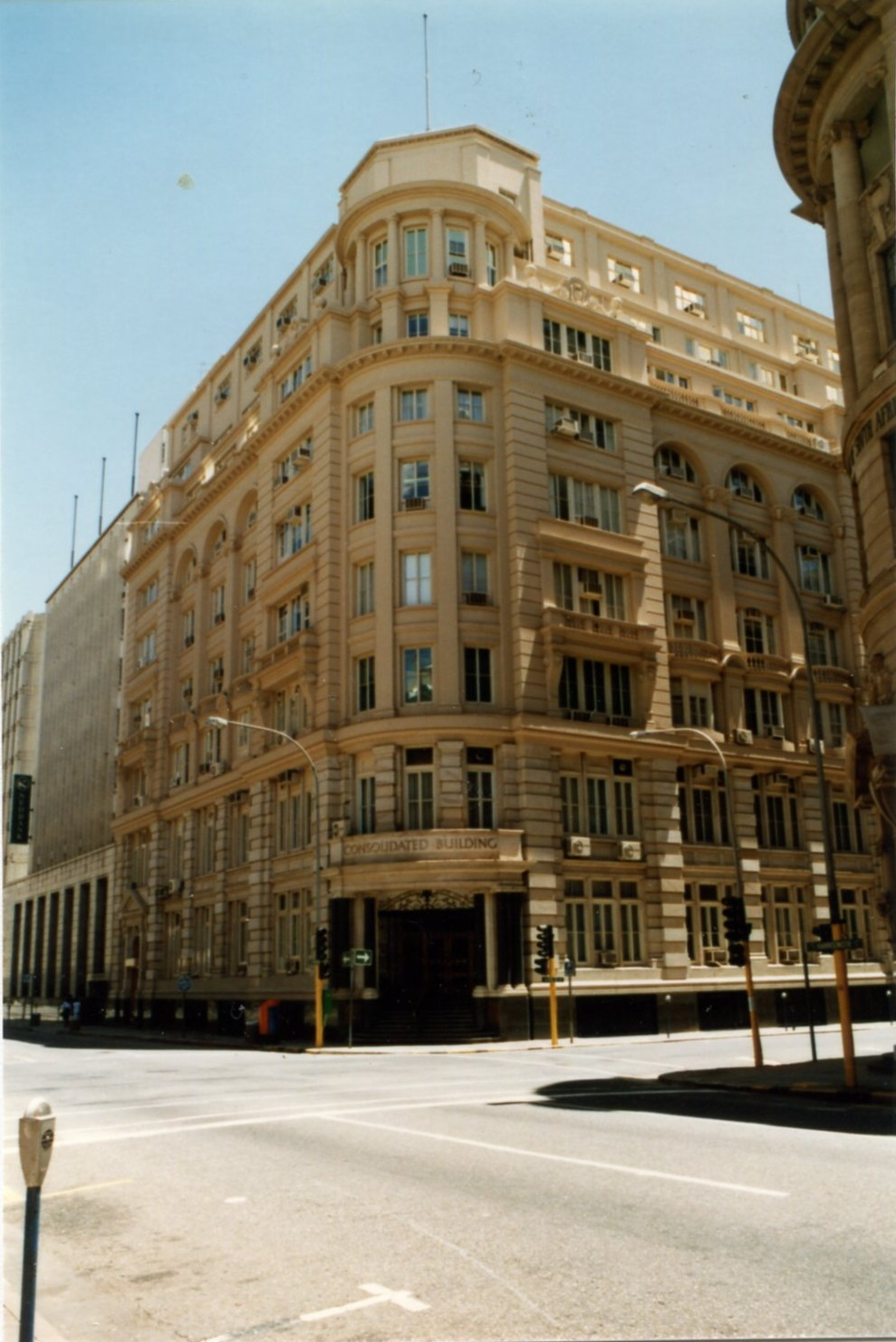
- A view of the building from street level. Cnr Fox & Harrison Str

- Location within Greater Johannesburg

General information
- Status: Completed
- Type: Office
- Location: Johannesburg, South Africa
- Coordinates: 26.2064°S 28.0382°E
- Construction started: 1904 (on drawing)
- Completed: 1906
- Opening: 1906
- Owner: Amdec Property Developments

Height
- Antenna spire: 80 m (260 ft)
- Roof: 75 m (246 ft)
- Top floor: 75 m (246 ft)

Technical details
- Floor count: 8
- Floor area: 800 m^{2} (8,600 sq ft)
- Lifts/elevators: 2

Design and construction
- Architects: Smith (London), Burrow & Treeby
- Developer: Milliken Brothers of New York

The Consolidated Building, or ‘Johnnies’ as it became affectionately known, is an office building situated in the Marshalltown district of Johannesburg, on stands 149, 150 and 152 at 84/86 Fox Street and 29/31 Harrison Street. In 1895, before the Consolidated Building was built, these stands were home to the Jewish Social Club and in 1897, Johannesburg Waterworks had its offices there.

The Consolidated Building was originally owned by Johannesburg Consolidated Investment Corporation Ltd. The Johannesburg Consolidated Investment Corporation was started as a family business by Barnett (Barney) Isaacs and his older brother Harry who later changed their surname to Barnato. Barney Barnato subsequently became a household name in South Africa and in international financial circles. The Corporation was responsible for the investments of many mining firms and collieries in South Africa.

== Design ==
The Consolidated Building was designed by architect Theo H. Smith of London, with supervision by Aburrow and Treeby architects of Johannesburg. It was built in 1904 and opened in 1906. This eight storey steel-framed building addresses the street corner of Fox Street and Harrison street with an attractive rounded corner entrance. It was originally built as six storeys, the original extent indicated by the cornice with dentil detailing, and two additional storeys were built on top in 1935 (architect unknown). It was this alteration that meant the original small dome to the corner tower was lost. The additional stories are clearly distinguished from the original building due to the set back from the facade and also the paler material used to render the elevations.

The facades of the Consolidated Building are of brick with plaster embellishment and a polished grey granite plinth. The linear vertical elements express the internal steel structure. The purest example of the American office block style and probably the earliest example in South Africa. The building references the ‘Chicago Style of America’. The Consolidated Building’s facade articulation was distinctly similar to that of Adler & Sullivan’s Auditorium Building (1887-9) in Chicago. It also showed similarities with the horizontally directed treatment of windows and rounded corners with narrow windows used by Sullivan in his Carson, Pirie & Scott building (1899-1904) in Chicago. Engineers Millikin Bros of New York were the contractors for the building, reinforcing the connection with the American style.

At 5832m2, this building offers prime office space in the Johannesburg CBD. Some of the internal walls were removed during refurbishment in 2008 to create modern open plan office spaces and air conditioning was also installed.

== Heritage Status ==
The Consolidated Building is now owned by Dreamworld Investments 374 and was listed by the Institute of South African Architects Grade A−. It is recognised as a heritage asset for the following reasons:

- The Consolidated Building is a fine example of the American office style
- The Consolidated Building is an attractive landmark building in a corner position in the heart of Johannesburg CBD
- The Consolidated Building has cultural significance due to its association with the significant financial organisation of Johannesburg Consolidated Investment Corporation Ltd
- The Consolidated Building has social significance due to its association with Barney Barnato
- The Consolidated Building has landmark significance due to locals giving it an affectionate name ‘Johnnies’, indicating its popularity and importance in the City
