= William Mathew Burt =

British politician and colonial administrator

William Mathew Burt (c. 1725 – 27 January 1781) was a British politician and colonial administrator. He owned properties on Saint Kitts and Nevis and served as governor of the British Leeward Islands from 1776 until his death in 1781. He was also member of parliament for Great Marlow from 1761 to 1768.

== Early life ==
Burt was born into "an old West Indian family". He was the son of William Pym Burt, chief justice of St. Kitts, and Louisa Mathew, daughter of Sir William Mathew. His great-grandfather arrived in Nevis in 1670 and the family moved to Saint Kitts in about 1725; he would inherit estates on both islands.

Burt served on the Council of Saint Kitts from 1748 to 1755.

== England ==
In the early 1750s, Burt moved to England. During the Seven Years' War, he was consulted by the British government prior to the invasion of Martinique in 1759 and accompanied the subsequent expedition to Guadeloupe. He was elected to parliament at the 1761 British general election and spoke primarily on trade matters or West Indian policy. A Whig, Burt supported George Grenville's administration and was in favour of the Stamp Act 1765. He was "badly defeated" at the 1768 election.

== Final years ==
Burt returned to Saint Kitts and served as governor of the Leeward Islands from 1776 until his death in office on 27 January 1781.

== Personal life ==
Burt married Sarah Foster, the daughter of a Jamaican planter and sister of Thomas Foster. He left his wife an £800 annuity (130000). His sister, Daniel Mathew Burt, married poet James Grainger.

In England, Burt had an estate named Maiden Early (also spelled Erlegh or Erleigh) near Reading, Berkshire. He recruited landscape gardener Capability Brown to produce a plan for his gardens in about 1778.

Parliament of Great Britain
Preceded by William Clayton; Daniel Moore	Member of Parliament for Great Marlow; 1761–1768; With: William Clayton	Succeeded by William Clayton; William Dickinson
