= Solomon Joel =

British-South African business magnate (1865-1931)

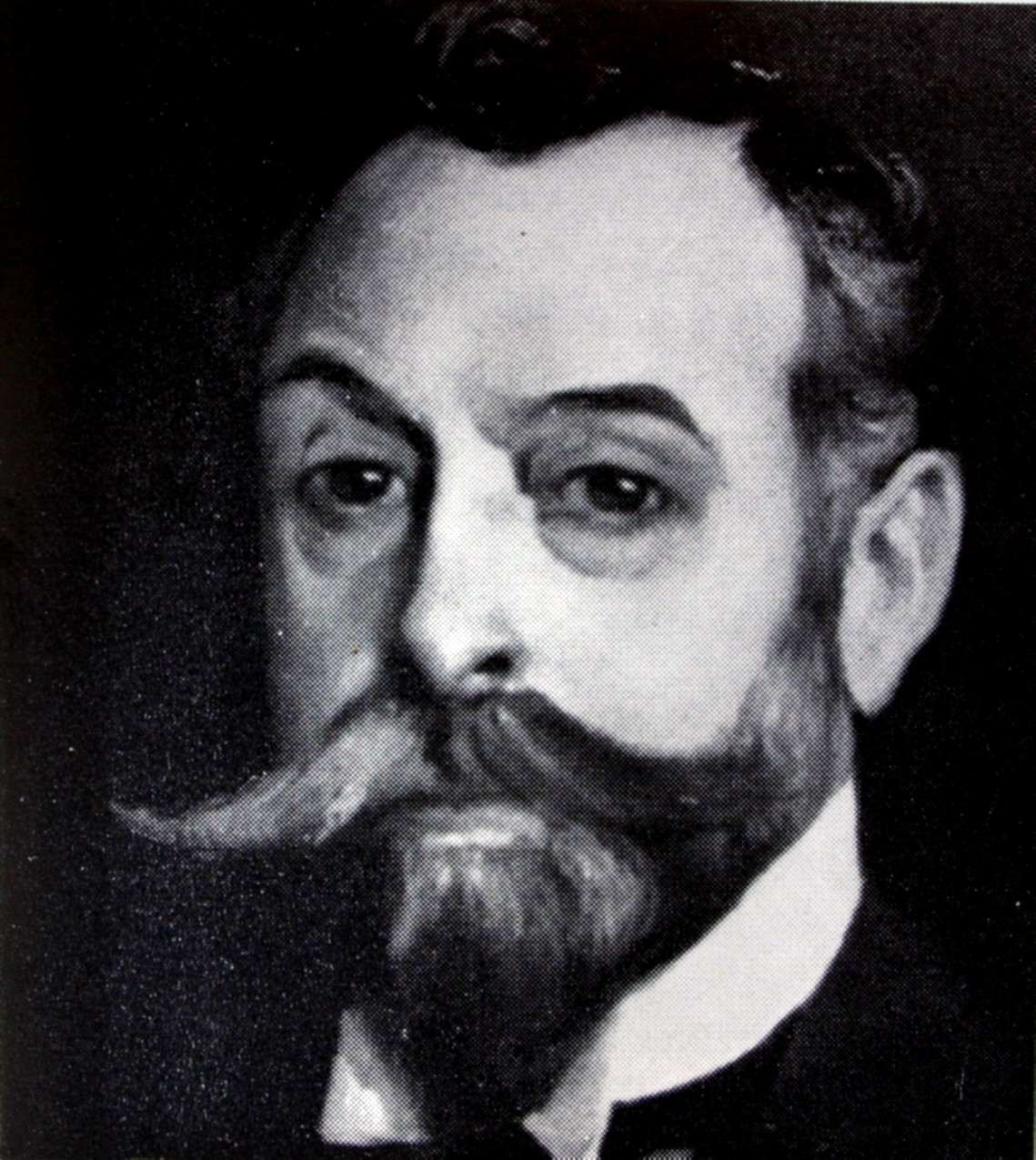
- Born: 23 May 1865; London, England
- Died: 22 May 1931 (aged 65); Newmarket, Suffolk, England
- Resting place: Willesden Jewish Cemetery
- Occupations: Financier; Thoroughbred racehorse owner-breeder
- Political party: Conservative
- Spouse: Ellen (Nellie) Ridley
- Children: 4
- Honors: Sol Joel Park in Earley, Berkshire; Joel Stakes at Newmarket Racecourse

Solomon Barnato Joel (23 May 1865 – 22 May 1931) was a British-South African business magnate. He moved to Cape Colony in the 1880s where he made his fortune in connection with diamonds, later becoming a financier with interests in mining, brewing and railways.

== Career ==
Known as "Solly", he was born into a Jewish family in London, one of three sons of Joel Joel, a publican and keeper of the King of Prussia tavern, and Kate Isaacs, who was a sister of Barnett Isaacs, later to be called Barney Barnato. Along with his two brothers, Jack and Woolf, Solly was mentored by Barney Barnato and made a fortune from the Barnato Diamond Mining Company in South Africa. Within 10 years, he had become a millionaire, primarily by buying seemingly worked-out diamond mines. On Barney Barnato's death in 1897, Joel became head of the family business, the Barnato Brothers. Despite his keen interest in diamonds, he played a greater role in the South African gold mining industry. He established the Van Ryn Deep Mine in 1902; the Government Gold Mining Areas (Modderfontein) Consolidated Limited, in 1910; and the New State Areas Ltd. in 1918. He acquired control of Langlaagte Estate and Gold Mining Company and Randfontein Estates Gold Mining Company from J. B. Robinson, and became a director of the Diamond Syndicate.

== Politics ==
Early in his business career he supported the Uitlanders against Paul Kruger's government, and was a prominent member of the Reform Committee. Having been found guilty of high treason for his part in the Jameson Raid, Joel never dabbled in politics again.

== Family ==
Joel married a beautiful young actress named Ellen "Nellie" Ridley. While highly successful in business, in his personal life familial relationships were not always cordial. His dislike of his daughter Doris' choice of spouse continued until she divorced after four years, at which point he resumed normal relations. Joel also disapproved of one of his sons, Stanhope's, marriage for two years. His daughter Eileen became the first woman jockey to win an open race when she rode Hogier to victory in the Town Plate at Newmarket. His son Dudley Joel was elected the Conservative Party Member of Parliament for Dudley but was killed in action during World War II.

Joel's brother Woolf Joel was murdered in Johannesburg in 1898, probably by a blackmailing con-man named Karl Frederic Moritz Kurtze going under the pseudonym of Ludwig von Veltheim. Although there was plenty of evidence that Veltheim had been threatening Woolf Joel, the defense was that Veltheim had not been properly compensated for planning a kidnap scheme against the Boer leader Paul Kruger. That, the all Boer jury, and the mixture of anti-British and anti-Semitic feelings towards the deceased enabled Veltheim to avoid conviction. Freed, he was immediately deported from the Boer territories. For the next decade, Veltheim was following a series of con-games in Europe, but in 1907, he turned up in London, and started making threatening demands against Joel, who reported him to Scotland Yard, and the police arrested Veltheim. There was a trial for extortion, and Veltheim used the same defense he had previously used in Johannesburg, but the British jury was unconvinced and found him guilty. He was sentenced to twenty years' imprisonment.

Joel's interests were wide and varied and included many business concerns. He was also kept busy with his enlarged family's diamond and gold mining interests, activities in brewing, the theatre (the Drury Lane Theatre in London) and railways (the City and South London Railway).

He was renowned for being a generous man who purchased the first motorised ambulance for the Royal Berkshire Hospital. Another illustration of his generosity was exhibited when he gave Sol Joel Park close to his estate to the Corporation of Reading in 1927. The official opening was undertaken by the then Duke of York, who later became King George VI and was again an extravagant event.

== Thoroughbred horse racing ==
Joel had success in thoroughbred horse racing and breeding. He owned Polymelus, a five-time leading sire in Great Britain & Ireland who sired Pommern, the 1915 English Triple Crown champion. He also established a stud at New Farm, which was renamed Home Stud Farm located near his own estate. The Joel Stakes at Newmarket Racecourse is named in his honor.

In 1903 Joel purchased the Maiden Erlegh estate in Earley, near Reading in Berkshire. In 1922 he purchased the racing establishment at Moulton Paddocks, Newmarket, after the death of its then owner, Sir Ernest Cassel.

He and his brother Jack Barnato Joel had a long running rivalry on the turf as owners, with Jack having the greater success over the years including 2 Epsom Derby winners, Sunstar and Humorist.

== Cricket ==
In the 1924–25 South African cricket season, Joel organised a team of mostly English players to tour the country and play matches against the national and provincial teams. The team was known as S. B. Joel's XI and included leading players Ewart Astill, George Geary, Percy Holmes, Alec Kennedy, Charlie Parker, Jack Russell, Lionel Tennyson and Ernest Tyldesley.

== Death and legacy ==
Joel died in 1931 at Moulton Paddocks and immediately his estate and possessions were sold at auction. The Home Stud Farm was sold in 1932 but continued until the 1980s. Moulton Paddocks passed into the ownership of Joel's son Dudley, but the house fell into disrepair following his death.

== See also ==
- Joel family
- Gustav Imroth

== Sources ==
- Oxford Dictionary of National Biography
- Standard Encyclopaedia of Southern Africa vol. 6 (Nasou, Cape Town 1972) ISBN 0-625-00322-5
- Stanhope Joel, Ace of Diamonds: The Story of Solomon Barnato Joel - as told to Lloyd Mayer (Frederick Muller Ltd. London 1958) ASIN: B0007KCDIK
- Brian Roberts, The Diamond Magnates (New York: Charles Scribner's Sons, 1972) [P. 232-245] SBN 684-13344-X
