= Earley Women's Institute =

Earley WI
- Earley Women's Institute
- Formation: 1938
- Dissolved: 2004
- Purpose: To enable women who are interested in, and want to improve the conditions of, issues associated with rural life such as arts, crafts, sciences, music, drama, culture, agriculture, home economics, and health and social welfare.

The Earley Women's Institute (also known as Earley WI) was a community-based organization for women situated in Earley, Berkshire, England. This organisation existed from 1938 to 2004. It sought to help local women develop skills, further their educations, and improve the community. During the Second World War, the Earley WI held talks on homemaking and preserving rationed food. The Earley WI also helped to ensure that evacuees had quality clothing and entertainment. After the Second World War, the Earley WI created activities, judged local competitions, carried out charity work in the local area and gave lessons on first aid. The organisation dissolved in February 2004, because of its poor financial position. Details of the organisation's work are in the Earley WI committee and meeting notes held at the Berkshire Record Office, in Reading.

A banner created by the Earley WI was awarded First Class at the Berkshire Festival Handicrafts Exhibition in 1951. It was subsequently selected for the National Federation WI Exhibition at the Victoria and Albert Museum in March 1952, and is held at the Reading Museum.

== History ==
=== 1938 ===
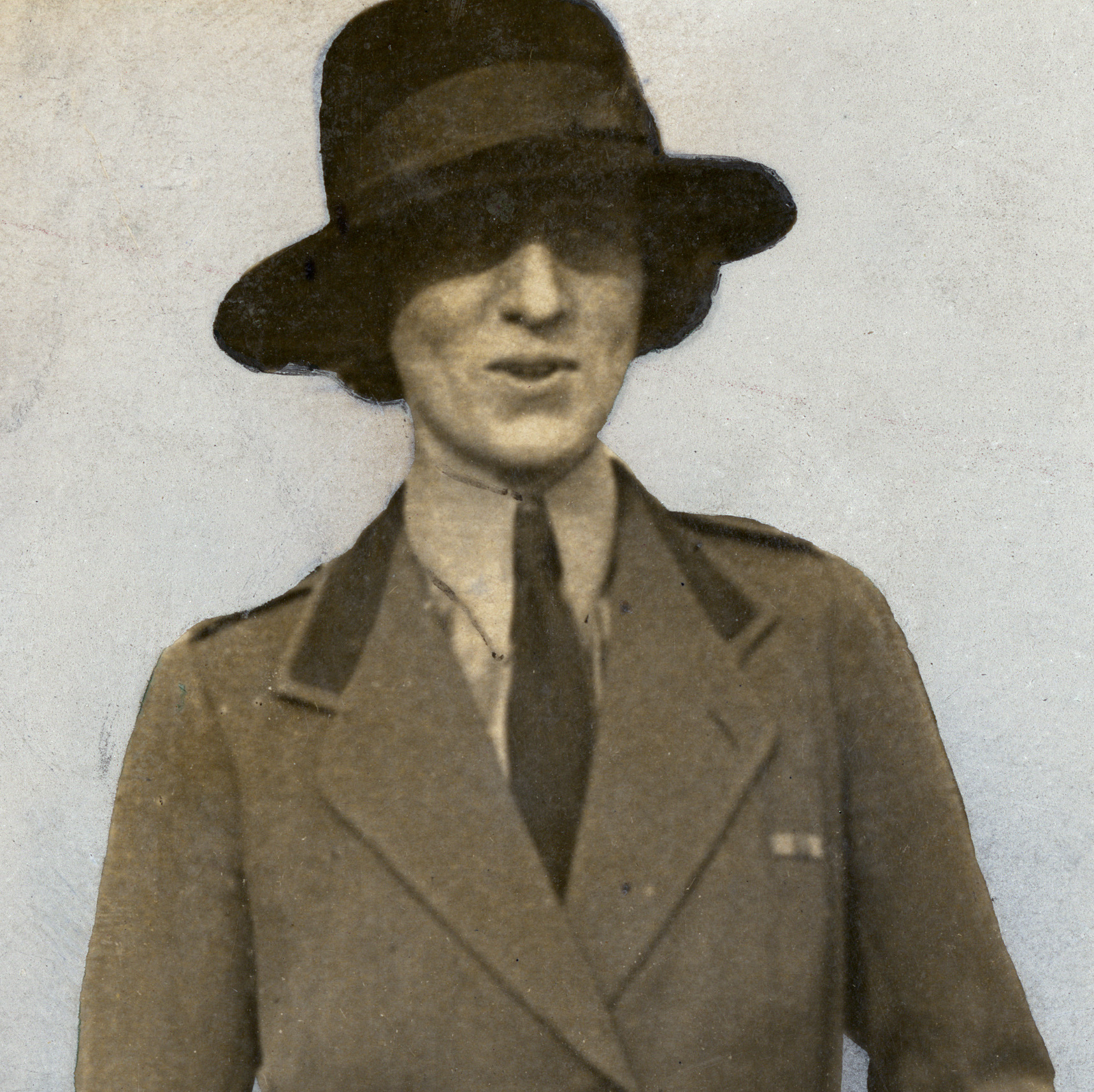
Lady Denman, the Chair of the NFWI.

The first recorded meeting of the Earley WI was on 30 March 1938 at St Peter's Small Hall in Earley. It was chaired by the Earley WI president, E.L. Rushbrooke, who opened the meeting by thanking Lady Denman for making it possible for the Earley WI to become an organisation. There were 30 attendees at this meeting, but by 15 December 1938, Earley WI was approaching 100 members.

=== 1939–1945 ===
During the Second World War, the Earley WI met regularly under their president, Anne Colebrook. At a meeting on 21 September 1939, three weeks after World War II had been declared, she said that "owing to the international situation, many activities will be canceled or curtailed".

The Earley WI worked on activities to benefit the local community, for example making garments for wartime children who had been evacuated or needed new clothing, supporting poor families and mothers by providing clothing and entertainment, and aiding the National Savings Movement. Notes from an Earley WI meeting on 19 September 1940 show that "various members offered to collect clothes for evacuated mothers and children from bombed areas – underwear is especially needed".

The organisation held talks on wartime cooking, canning classes, and general home economics, which helped women learn how to preserve and get the most out of rationed food. W.I.s across the country grew and preserved food.

=== 1945–1950 ===
Following the end of the Second World War, the Earley WI returned to the activities it had started in 1938. The charity work continued, and funds went to help the war recovery effort.

=== 1951 ===
At an Earley WI meeting on 2 April 1951, the Berkshire Festival Handicrafts Exhibition was announced. The exhibition was to be held at Pythouse, in Ashampstead and would exhibit period furniture and needlework. Earley WI was encouraged to create something for the exhibition and began working on a banner representing the organization. Plans for the banner and its design were made, and it was estimated that the cost for wool and linen materials would be about £3.0.4. By 4 June 1951, A.E. Taylor, who was in charge of the Earley WI, asked members to volunteer to help work on the banner. By 3 September 1951, after continued work on the banner, the work was completed, and the pole for the banner had been ordered, and the overall cost of the banner was £10.0.5. On 1 October 1951, A.E. Taylor gave the figures for the annual financial statement which showed to be lower than in previous years; this was believed to be due to the £10 cost of the banner. At this meeting, A.E. Taylor also suggested that the names of the helpers who made the banner should be embroidered on the back of it.

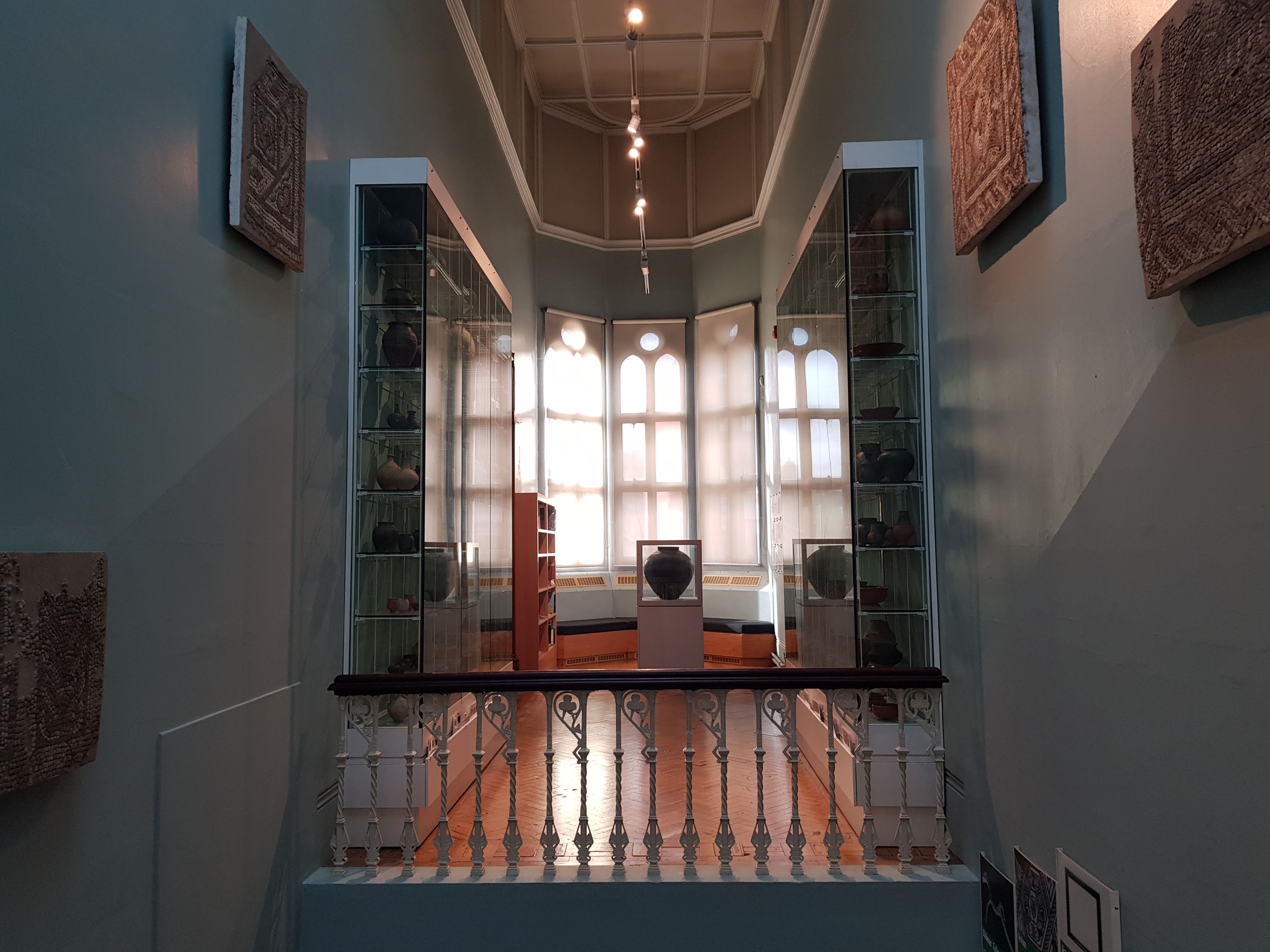
Reading Museum, Berkshire, where the 1951 Earley WI Banner can be seen today.

The design of the banner represents Whiteknights, the country estate that became the University of Reading's new campus in 1947. The banner was awarded First Class at the Berkshire Festival Handicrafts Exhibition in 1951. It was subsequently selected for the National Federation WI Exhibition at the Victoria and Albert Museum in London. The banner has the names of the embroiderers embroidered in black on the back of it: N. Blay, M.E. Day, M. Derrick, H. O'Neill, A. Pope, G. Prouten, E. Shave, M.G. Sturges, A.E. Taylor, and A.E. Tilbrook. The banner remained in the possession of the Earley WI until 2004 when the organisation was suspended and the then president of the Earley WI, Freda Drakes, decided to donate the banner to the Reading Museum.

=== 1952–1998 ===
Over the next 46 years, the Earley WI continued to work as a charity organisation and encouraged women to develop skills related to their interests.

=== 1998–2002 ===
Between 1998 and 2000, the Earley WI was tasked with creating something for the millennium. Meeting notes from 6 September 1999 show that the Earley WI contacted the Earley Town Council to see if they could contribute to any millennium projects that the council might have been doing. The Earley Town Council originally proposed that the Earley WI could create a collective recipe book and an oral record of the Earley WI. The Earley Park Ranger, Grahame Hawker, was already collating articles about the history of Earley and so the Earley WI decided to do something similar. They decided to collate their memoirs in a book, which was open to anyone wanting to submit a memoir until March 2000.

=== 2002–2004 ===
In 2002, the focus of the Earley WI shifted to the Golden Jubilee celebrations for Queen Elizabeth II. In April 2002, the Earley WI held a minute's silence for the death of the Queen Mother and sent a letter of condolence to Buckingham Palace.

On 19 February 2004, a special meeting was called to address the organisation's financial situation, as financial statements showed limited funds, and it was becoming difficult to continue supporting the Earley WI. Twenty-seven members of the Earley WI attended. Judy Palmer from the Berkshire Federation WI Advisors explained that the Earley WI was suspended because of financial constraints. The Earley WI ceased as an organisation by mid-2004. On 18 March 2004, the disposal of assets was negotiated, and everything belonging to the organisation was packed up. On 15 April 2004, the decision was made to donate the 1951 Earley WI banner to the Reading Museum. The banner can be seen there today.
