= Gustav Imroth =

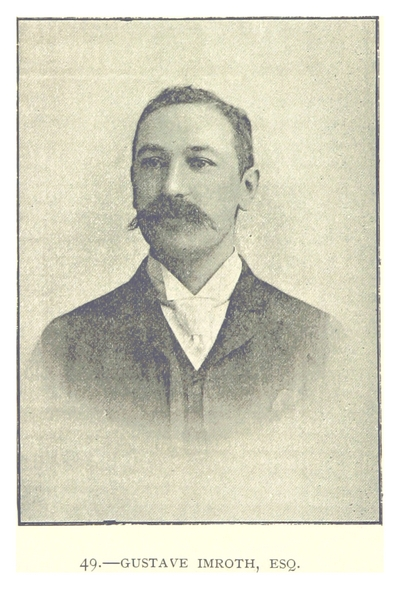

Gustav Imroth (29 June 1862 – 10 October 1946) was a minor Randlord who played a role in the development of the South African diamond-mining industry and sports.

He was born in Friedberg, Grand Duchy of Hesse, in 1862 into a Jewish banking family, travelled first to London in 1880, where he was naturalised British, and then to Kimberley, South Africa in 1884 to work in the diamond industry for Dunkelsbuhler and Company alongside his cousins Louis Oppenheimer and Fredrich Hirschhorn. Gustav Imroth later represented Barnato Brothers in their dealings with the diamond syndicate (later De Beers), working closely with Solomon Joel and Ernest Oppenheimer (also a first cousin). He helped found the Johannesburg Consolidated Investment Company Limited ("Johnnies") and was its managing director from 1911 to 1920, when he retired to London.

An amateur boxer, keen supporter of South African sports and founder member of the Wanderers Club, Gustav Imroth was a boxing umpire in the 1908 London Olympics and served as chairman of the Olympic Games Committee.

He married his maternal first cousin Florence Hirschhorne (1871–1974) in London in 1893; they had three children: Leslie (1896–1918), Freda (1899–1960) and Alice (1903–1992). Lieutenant Leslie Imroth of the 11th Hampshire Regiment died in 1918 of wounds sustained during the Great War.
