= Thames Valley Park =

Business park on the outskirts of Reading in the English county of Berkshire

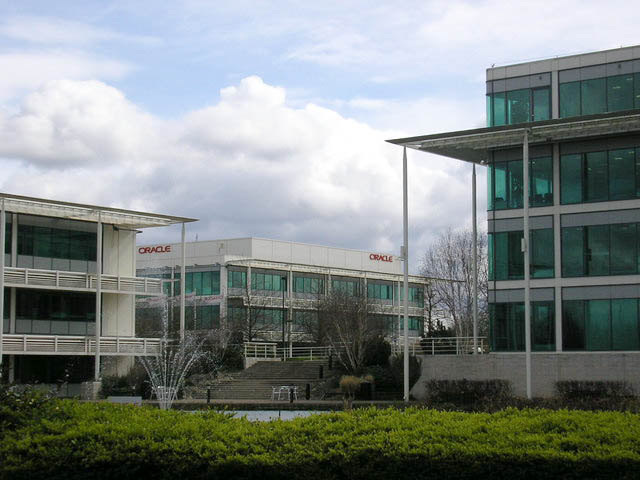
- The Oracle Corporation campus

- Location within Reading
- Location: Earley Berkshire, England
- Coordinates: 51.4615°N 0.9312°W
- Developer: Argent Group
- Website: thamesvalleypark.com

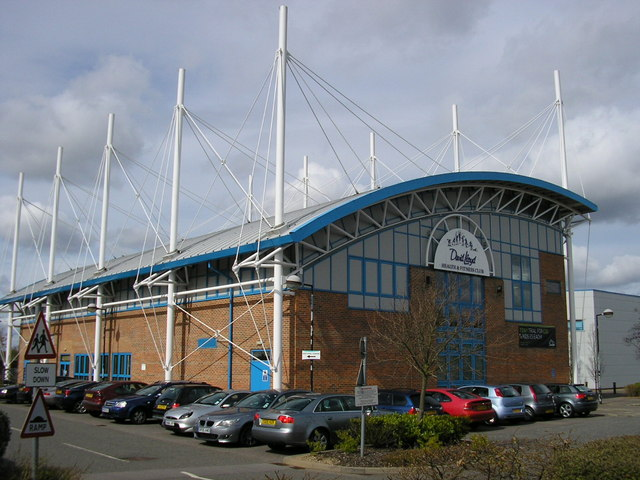
David Lloyd Health & Fitness Club.

Thames Valley Park (also known as TVP) is a high-tech business park adjacent to the River Thames on the eastern outskirts of Earley in Berkshire, England. Companies based at the park include BBC Radio Berkshire, Steria, SGI, Regus, Websense, Oracle, Microsoft, Hewlett-Packard, OpenText, ING Direct, Huawei and Vistra. There is also a day-care nursery and a David Lloyd club on-site.

The business park also features a nature reserve with several lakes which provide access to the nearby Thames Path. The site had formerly been occupied by Earley Power Station; before the business park was developed, its redundant buildings covered much of the site, with dumps of waste pulverised fuel ash extending onto the floodplain.

== Transport links ==
Thames Valley Park is at the northern terminus of the A3290 (formerly part of the A329(M)), which connects to the M4 and the A4. A free bus service links TVP to Reading railway station, which has good connections for London and Heathrow Airport.

A railway station to serve the park was proposed in 1998 to the Reading Borough Local Plan, but this was never built.

== See also ==
- List of parks and open spaces in Reading, Berkshire
