= Joel family =

South African family of English-Jewish descent

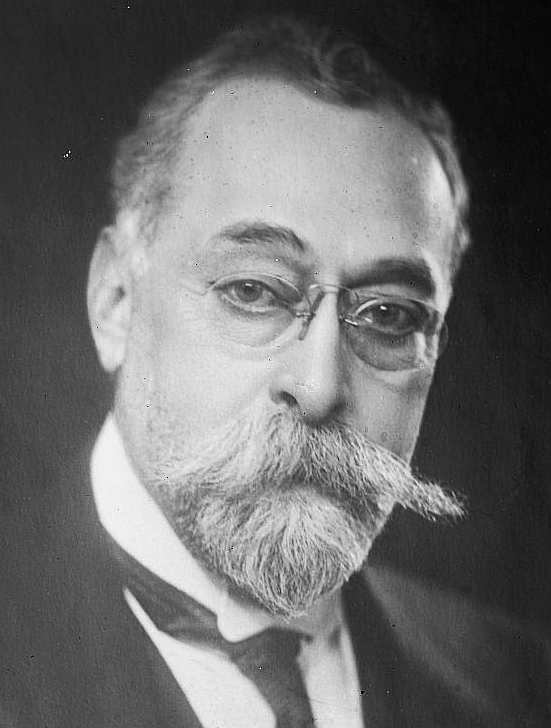
Solomon Joel

The Joel family of England was headed by three brothers, Jack, Woolf and Solomon, who made a fortune in diamond and gold mining in South Africa. Their father was Joel Joel (1836–1893) and their mother Catherine "Kate" Joel née Isaacs (1840–1917), a sister of Barnett Isaacs, later known as Barney Barnato.

As well as being prominent Randlords, several of the Joel family became widely known in thoroughbred horse racing as owner/breeders of numerous winners of British Classic Races.

== The Joel brothers ==
- Jack Barnato Joel (1862–1940), mining magnate, Chairman of Johannesburg Consolidated Investment Company Ltd (from 1931), Thoroughbred racehorse owner/breeder married to Olive Coulson Sopwith (d. 1937), daughter of Thomas Sopwith.
- Woolf Barnato Joel (1863–1898), South African mining magnate
- Solomon Barnato Joel (1865–1931), mining, brewing and railway magnate

== Other Joels ==
Other prominent members of the Joel family include:

- Stanhope Henry Joel (1903–1973), businessman, Thoroughbred racehorse owner/breeder
- Dudley Joel (1904–1941), businessman, politician, World War II naval officer

== Other relations ==
- Barney Barnato
- Joel Woolf Barnato, son of Barney Barnato
  - Diana Barnato Walker

== Family tree ==
Joel Joel (1836/1837 - 7 Apr 1893), son of Isaac Joel (c1800-1847) and Rebecca Solomon (c1800-1842). Joel Joel married Catherine Isaacs (1840, Spitalfields - 8 Nov 1917). She was the daughter of Isaac Isaacs and Leah Harris

1. Jack Barnato Joel (29 Sep 1862 - 13 Nov 1940) x Edith Richards (3 children) xx Olive Coulson Sopwith (1876-1937)
  1. Harry "Jim" Joel (1894 – 23 March 1992), businessman, philanthropist, Thoroughbred racehorse owner/breeder
  2. May b.1892 d.10 Feb 1971
  3. Kathleen
2. Woolf Joel (22 Nov 1863-14 March 1898) (shot dead in Johannesburg office by blackmailer Baron Kurt von Veltheim whose real name was Karl Frederic Moritz Kurtze, and was born at Allhausen, Brunswick, on 4 December 1857)
  1. Geoffrey (10 March 1896 London - 22 March 1957 Johannesburg) x Edith - maiden name unknown.
3. Solomon Barnato Joel (23 May 1865 - 22 May 1931) married Ellen "Nellie" Ridley (1867-14 August 1919) (5 children) xx Phoebe Carlow
  1. Doris Irene Kathleen b. 1898 d. 14 August 1919 x Arthur Walter
  2. Woolf 26 April 1892 d.13 November 1923, named after Uncle Woolf Joel
  3. Stanhope Henry b.8 February 1903 at 2 Gt. Stanhope St, Mayfair x Gladys MacFadden
    1. Solna, married Harry Thomson Jones
    2. Dana
    3. Thalia
  4. Dudley Jack Barnato (26 April 1904 - 26 May 1941) (drowned at sea) - Conservative Party Member of Parliament x Esme Ritchie
  5. Eileen Daphne Solvia (20 March 1907 - 30 Jan 1974) x John Rogerson

== See also ==
- Joel Stakes
- Sol Joel Park
- Diana Barnato Walker
