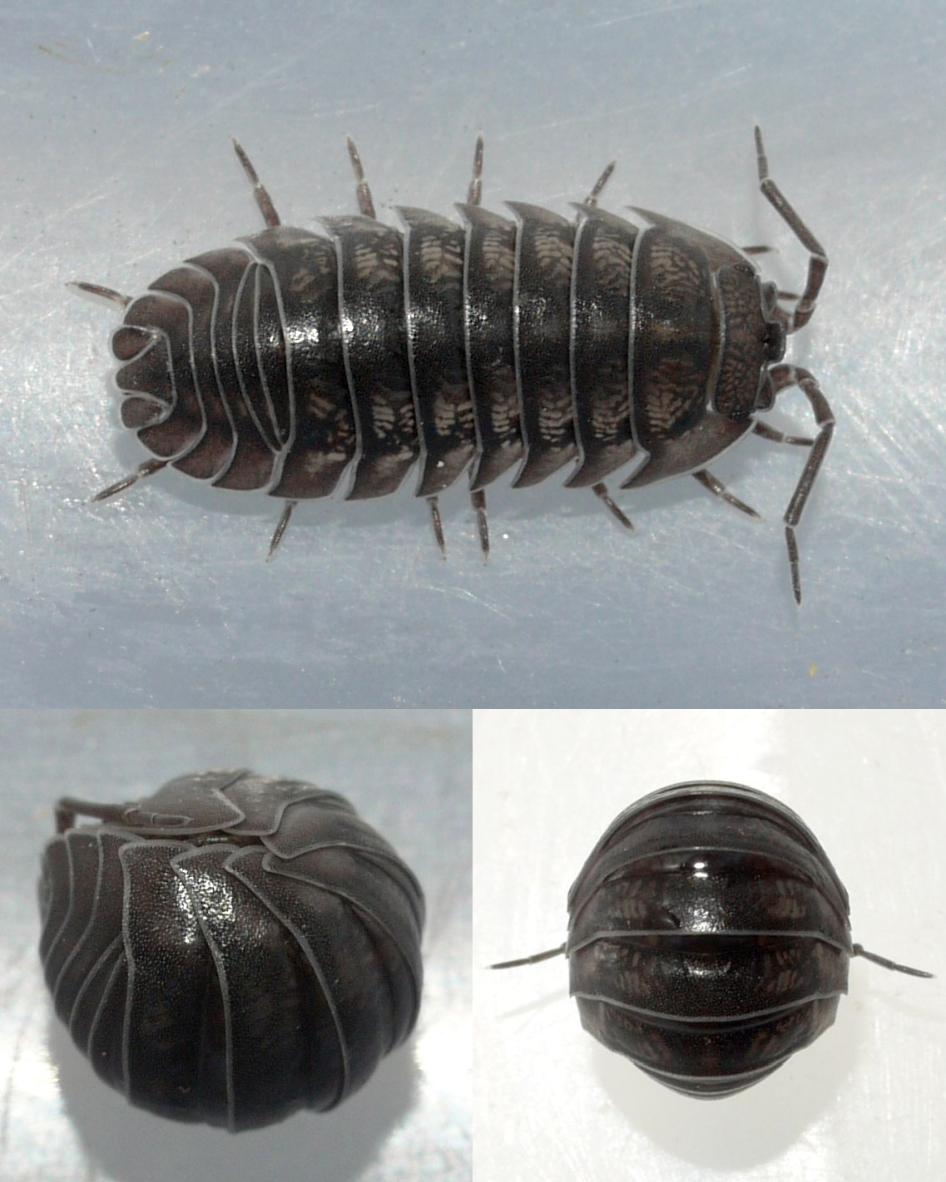
- Armadillidium nasatum, in standard posture (above) and conglobated (below)

Scientific classification
- Kingdom: Animalia
- Phylum: Arthropoda
- Clade: Pancrustacea
- Class: Malacostraca
- Order: Isopoda
- Suborder: Oniscidea
- Family: Armadillidiidae
- Genus: Armadillidium
- Species: A. nasatum

Binomial name
- Armadillidium nasatum Budde-Lund, 1833

Subspecies
- Five subspecies
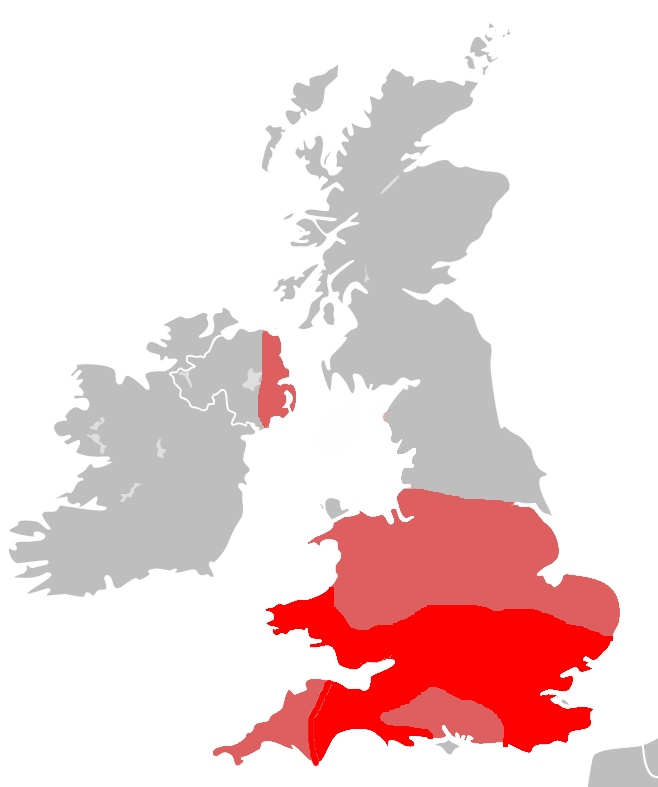
- Range (UK only)

Synonyms
- Armadillidium mehelyi; Armadillidium nasutum; Armadillidium quadrifrons; Armadillidium sorrentinum; Armadillidium speyeri

= Armadillidium nasatum =

Species of woodlouse

Armadillidium nasatum, the nosy pill woodlouse, is a large, Western European-based species of woodlouse that has been introduced to North America, along with Armadillidium vulgare also found in other parts of Europe.

== Description ==
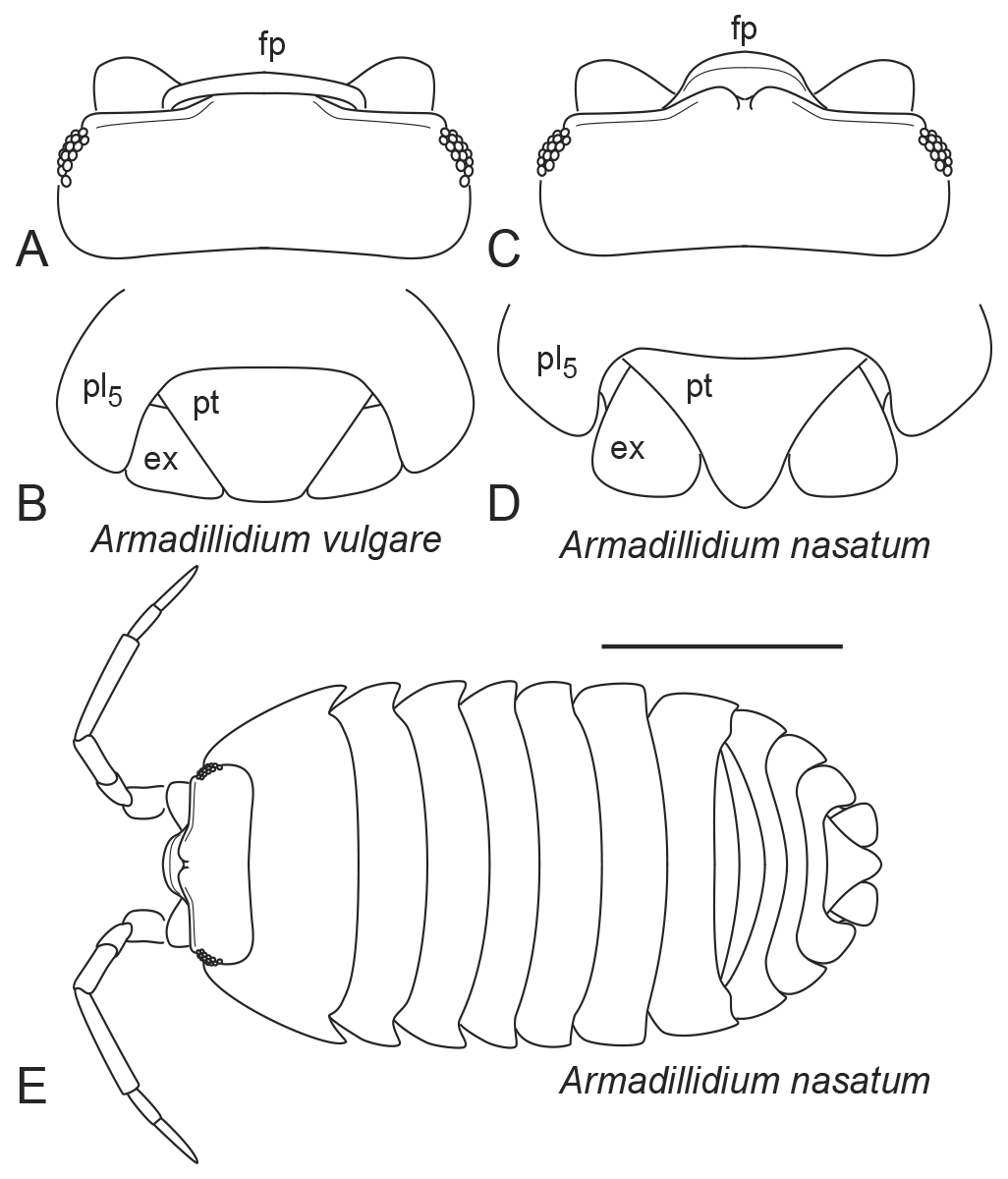
Morphological comparison between Armadillidium nasatum and A. vulgare

Armadillidium nasatum can reach lengths of up to 21 millimetres. Like Armadillidium depressum, it does not form a complete ball when enrolled. Though similar in outwards appearance to Armadillidium vulgare in dark grey color, the main distinguishing feature is a rectangular-like protrusion ("nose") towards the apex of the head. The tail (telson) has a rounded tip with incurved sides, as opposed to most genus Armadillidium species which have a smaller, flat tail. Pale longitudinal stripes spanning from head to rear are seen on some individuals, though this is variable and is not a diagnostic feature.

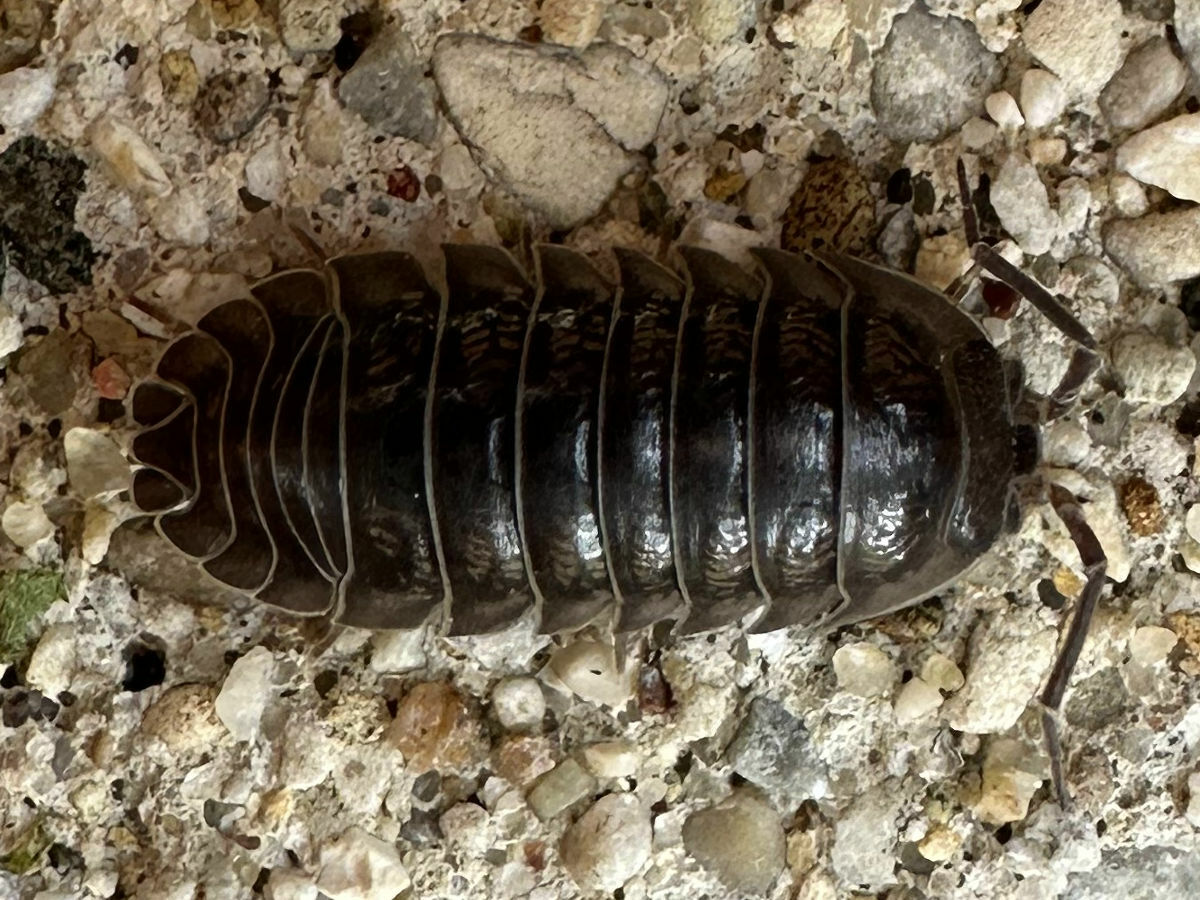
A. nasatum: note the "nose" and large telson

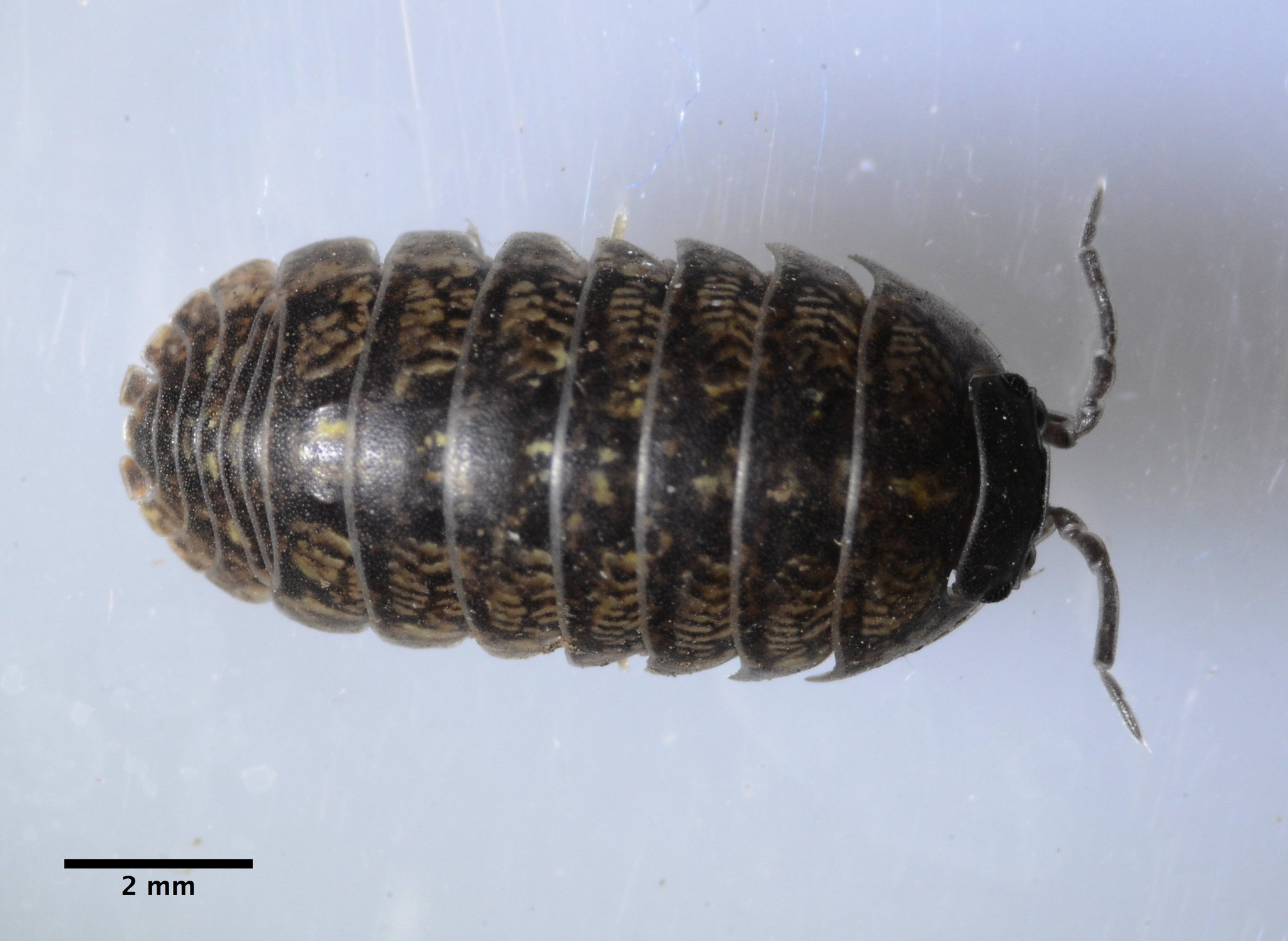
A. vulgare: no "nose" and smaller telson

== Distribution ==
Armadillidium nasatum occurs in patches in southern England, with concentrated areas in its range and sporadic occurrences in Ireland. It lives in dryer areas than most woodlice, is synanthropic, and is frequently found in non-inhabited areas such as railway lines and industrial waste ground. Like other woodlice, it is found under stones and wood.

== Subspecies ==
There are five recognized subspecies in the species Armadillidium nasatum:

- Armadillidium nasatum flava Colinge, 1989
- Armadillidium nasatum mehelyi Verhoeff, 1930
- Armadillidium nasatum nasatum Budde-Lund, 1885
- Armadillidium nasatum nigrescens Collinge, 1918
- Armadillidium nasatum saidovni Arcangeli, 1950
