= Barney Barnato =

British businessman who made his fortune in South Africa (1851–1897)

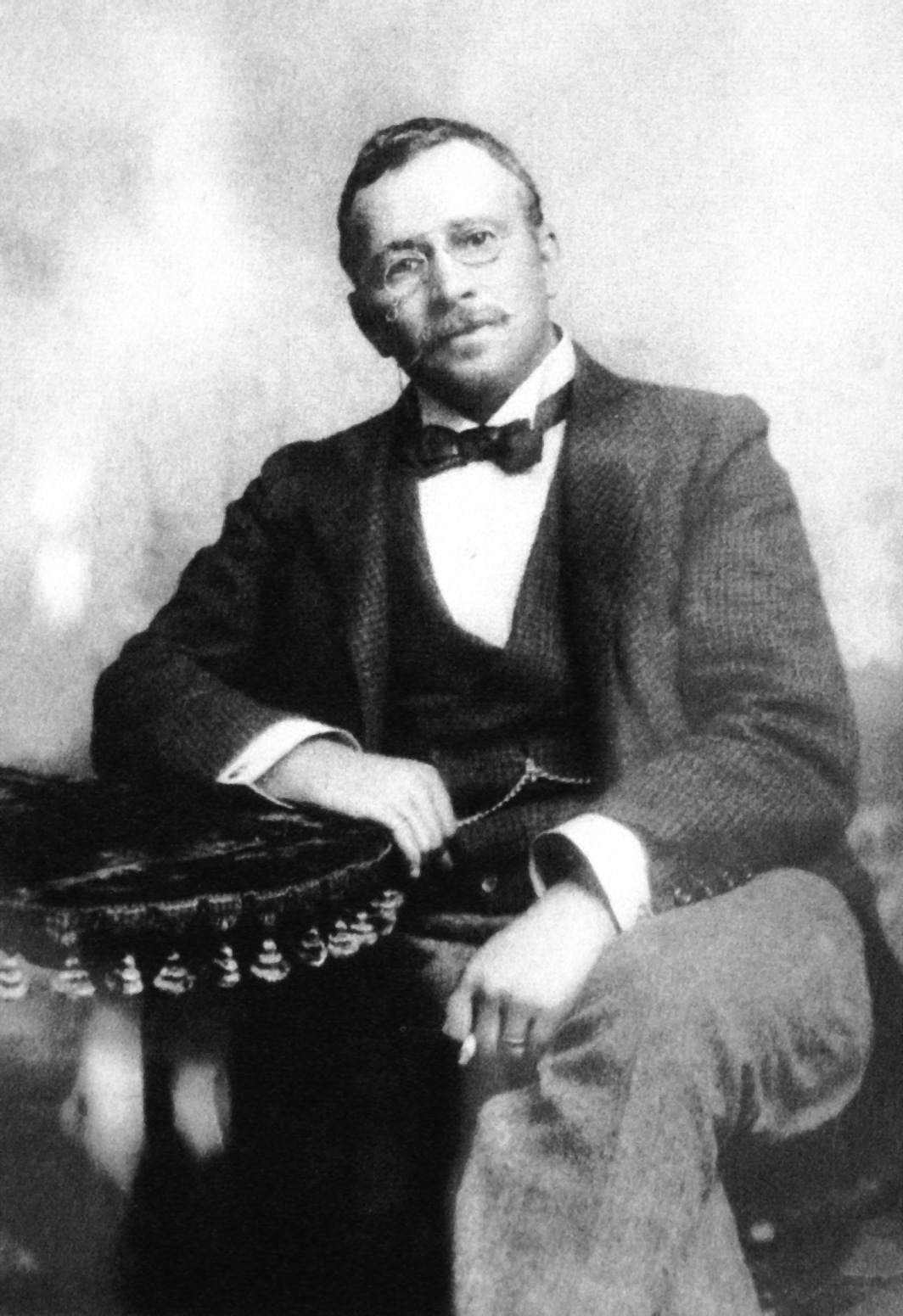
- Barney Barnato circa 1890
- Born: Barnet Isaacs; 21 February 1851; Aldgate, London, England
- Died: 14 June 1897 (aged 46); At sea, near the island of Madeira
- Occupations: Diamond and gold mining entrepreneur
- Spouse: Fanny Christina Bees
- Children: 4, including Woolf

Barney Barnato (born Barnet Isaacs; 21 February 1851 – 14 June 1897) was a British Randlord and diamond magnate who was one of the entrepreneurs who gained control of diamond mining, and later, gold mining in South Africa from the 1870s up to World War I. He was known as a rival of Cecil Rhodes.

== Early life ==
Barnato was born Barnet Isaacs in Aldgate, London, on 21 February 1851, to Isaac and Leah Isaacs. He and his siblings, Harry, Kate, Sarah and Lizzie, grew up in Whitechapel. Their mother died in 1852 and their father made a living by selling second hand clothing and fabric remnants. Barnato was educated by Moses Angel at the Jews' Free School, but left school with Harry in their early teens to join their father's business. The brothers performed on stage in the music halls as the Great Henry Isaacs "and Barnett too". They became known as Bar-na-to, or the Barnato, Brothers. Barney also become a prizefighter.

== Career ==
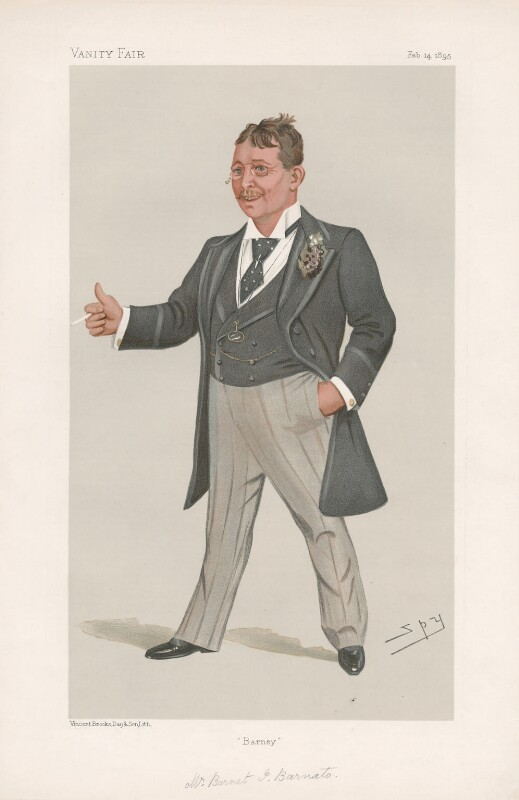
Barnato, caricatured by Spy in Vanity Fair, 1895

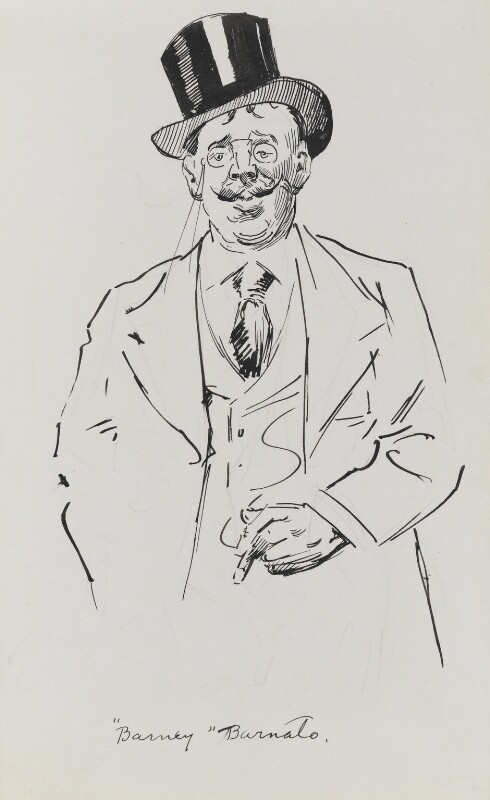
Barnett Isaacs Barnato by Harry Furniss. Pen and ink, 1880s–1900s. National Portrait Gallery, London

In 1873, Barnato joined his brother Harry in the Cape Colony during the diamond rush. The pair eventually bought four claims in Kimberley. The French mining company Compagnie Française des Mines de Diamants du Cap de Bonne Espérance, owned by Jules Porgès, held a large block of claims that split the Kimberley Mine in two. Barnato telegraphed Porgès to express interest in bidding if he was to sell. Cecil Rhodes bid £1.4 million to acquire the company and Barnato countered with £1.75 million. Before receiving a response from Porgès, Rhodes contacted Barnato and requested he withdraw his offer. In exchange, Rhodes suggested he purchase the company at his original bid price and sell it to Barnato for £300,000 plus a twenty percent holding in Barnato's Kimberley Central Diamond Mining Company (DMC). After several days of consideration, Barnato agreed to withdraw his offer, and a month later, he owned Porgès' company. Shares in Kimberley Central DMC surged from £14 to £49.

Rhodes' next proposal was to merge the De Beers Diamond Mining Company (DMC) into Kimberley Central DMC to form De Beers Consolidated Mines. Barnato emerged as the largest shareholder, with 6,658 shares in the new company. A group of shareholders from Kimberley Central applied to the Supreme Court of the Cape to stop the merger, and the judge ruled in favour of the applicants. Kimberley Central was liquidated and De Beers Consolidated purchased the company. The Barnato brothers' shares were bought out for the sum of £5,338,650 in 1889. By the time they made it to Johannesburg in 1888, a dozen gold mining companies were already present in the London Stock Exchange and the Johannesburg Stock Exchange. With his nephews Woolf and Solomon Joel (Solly), Barnato spent more than a million pounds in one year, including investments in Johannesburg's infrastructure. Early in 1889, he floated his first gold mining company on the stock exchanges. After the formation of his Johannesburg Consolidated Investment Company that year, he went on a major acquisition plan. Barnato doubled his fortune in the boom in South African gold mining shares of 1894–95 before losing most of it in the 1896 share collapse.

== Death ==
Barnato died in 1897; records state that he was lost overboard near the island of Madeira while on a passage home to England. A crew member gave evidence at the inquest that Barnato had been walking round the deck with his nephew Solly Joel at the time and, as he fell overboard, his last word was "murder!" Solly was suspected to have been stealing money from the company, which he inherited on Barnato's death. Some have suggested that witnessing the Jameson Raid had left Barnato severely depressed and that he died by suicide as a result, though his family have dismissed this as being out of character. Another suggestion is that he had been killed by conman Karl Frederick Kurtze, who in 1898 went under the name Ludwig von Veltheim. Barnato's nephew Woolf Joel was shot dead in Johannesburg by a blackmailer in 1898, suspected to be von Veltheim. At the murder trial, von Veltheim claimed that Barnato and Joel had hired him to kidnap Paul Kruger, and that he had simply been seeking payment, an explanation that saw him acquitted.

His fortune was divided up among his family, among which were his sister Sarah and her husband Abraham Rantzen, great-grandparents of TV presenter Esther Rantzen. Another beneficiary was his son, Woolf Barnato, who used part of the multimillion-pound fortune he inherited at the age of two to become a racing driver in the 1920s, one of the so-called Bentley Boys.

== Personal life ==
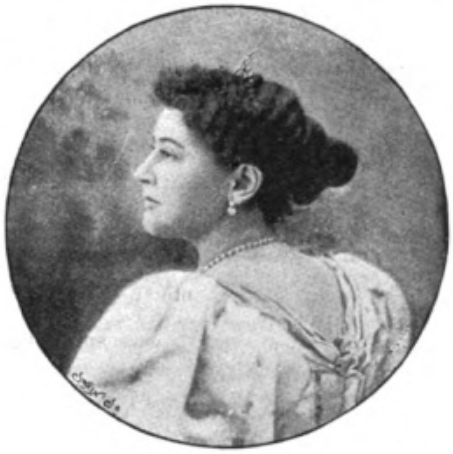
Fanny Christina Bees

Barney married Fanny Christina Bees. Together, they had three children:

- Leah "Lily" Primrose Barnato (1893–1933)
- Isaac "Jack" Henry Woolf Barnato (c. 1894–1918)
- Woolf "Babe" Barnato (1895–1948)

He was also the father of Isabel Louisa Barnato (born 5 June 1891, died 19 June 1891), daughter of Isabella Barnato (born Isabella Clarke 30 November 1865, died 30 October 1891).

Barnato built, but never lived in, a vast house on the corner of Park Lane and Stanhope Gate in Mayfair, London, which was bought after his death by the banker Sir Edward Sassoon.

== Legacy ==
In 2024, at the South African Jewish Board of Deputies' 120th anniversary gala dinner, he was honoured among 100 remarkable Jewish South Africans who have contributed to South Africa. The ceremony included speeches from Chief Rabbi Ephraim Mirvis, and Barnato was honoured among other business figures such as Raymond Ackerman, Sol Kerzner and Donald Gordon.

=== Cultural depictions ===
- Barnato's life was the subject of a South African television mini-series, Barney Barnato, made in 1989 and first aired on SABC in early 1990.

== See also ==
- Joel family
- John Hays Hammond – a mining engineer, diplomat and philanthropist whom Barnato brought to Africa
- List of unsolved deaths
