= Sol Joel Park =

Public park in Berkshire, England

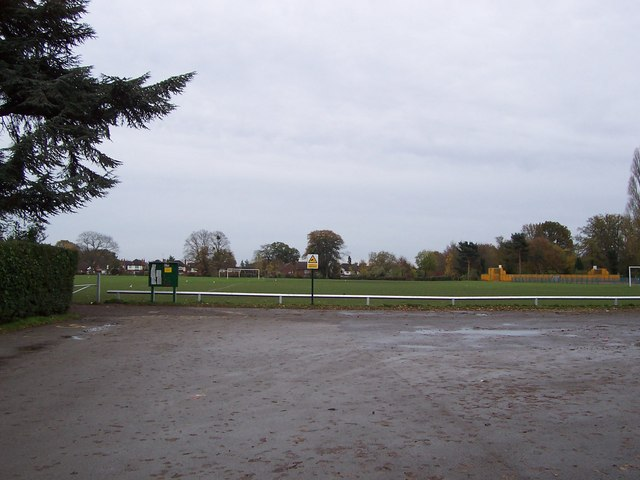
- View from the car park

- Location within Reading, Berkshire
- Type: Public
- Location: Earley, Reading, Berkshire, UK
- Coordinates: 51°26′34″N 0°55′36″W

Sol Joel Park is a public park in Earley, a town east of Reading, Berkshire, England, on the Wokingham Road. It was given to the Corporation of Reading in 1927 by Solomon Joel. Its official opening was by the then Duke of York, who subsequently became King George VI.

Earley Town Council had been in negotiation with Reading Borough Council, as successors to the Corporation of Reading, for some years now regarding the possibility of the transfer of ownership. A breakthrough in the negotiations came in 1998, when the Borough Council agreed to a 25-year lease of the old hard tennis court area on which the Town Council wished to erect a Sports and Skate Park. This facility, which has been provided by Earley Town Council, was officially opened in July 1999 by Councillor Andrew Long, Chairman of Earley Town Council. It includes one sport court for five-a-side football and/or basketball.

Discussions as to potential partnership arrangements between Earley Town Council and Reading Borough Council were successfully concluded in 1999 with regard to the remainder of the Park, which is held on a 50-year lease. When the area was conveyed to the Borough Council back in the 1930s, a Trust was set up by the late Sol Joel, and even if any new arrangement was agreed, Reading Borough Council, as the Trustees, would need to retain the freehold although Earley Town Council manages and has improved most of the remaining facilities.

There has been significant investment in facilities in the park in recent times. In Jan 2012 the then Mayor of Earley Town, Cllr Tim Chambers opened a large new skate park replacing the previous wooden structure and in June 2012 a new Parkour site, the first in the region, was officially opened by Mayor of Wokingham Borough Council Bob Wyatt and Earley Town Mayor Pauline Jorgensen. This has replaced the under used inline hockey pitch opened in 1999.

The Town Council replaced the pavilion on the site starting in September 2012 with the demolition of the old wooden structure.

Since 2012 the site has been protected by Fields in Trust as part of the Queen Elizabeth II Fields Challenge. This was a project to safeguard the future of parks and green spaces as public recreation land for future generations to enjoy and provide a permanent legacy of the Diamond Jubilee and the Olympics.

== See also ==
- List of parks and open spaces in Reading, Berkshire
