= Hugo Hirst, 1st Baron Hirst =

German-born British industrialist (1863–1943)

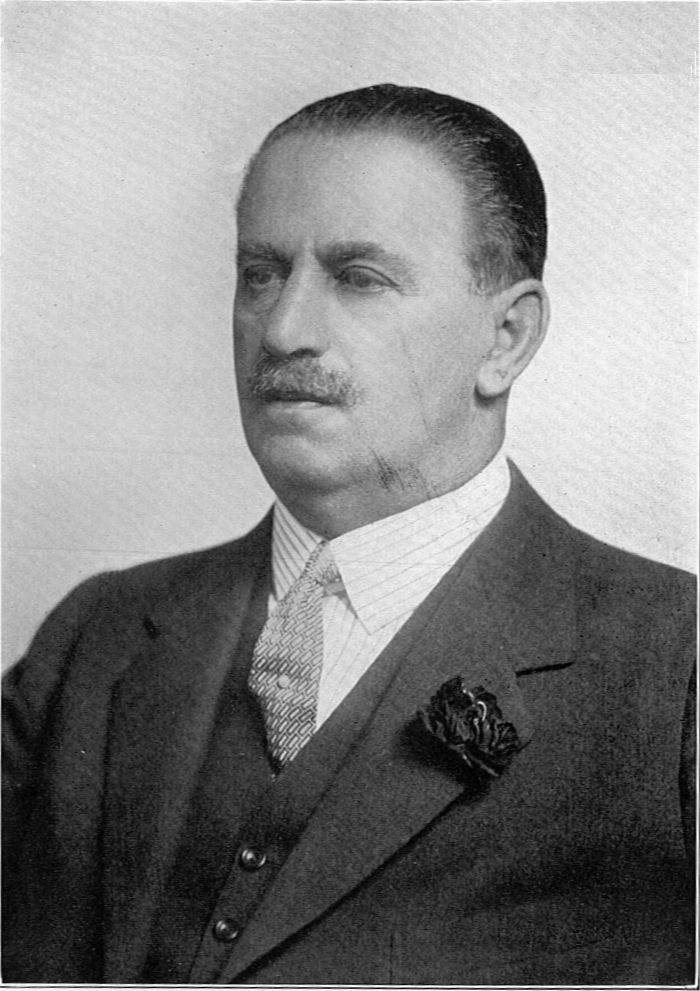
- Sir Hugo Hirst, Bart, around 1930
- Born: 26 November 1863; Munich
- Died: 22 January 1943 (aged 79)

Hugo Hirst, 1st Baron Hirst (26 November 1863 – 22 January 1943), known as Sir Hugo Hirst, Bt, between 1925 and 1934, was a German-born British industrialist.

Born near Munich, Hugo Hirsch became a naturalized British subject in 1883 and changed his surname to Hirst.

He was co-founder with Gustav Binswanger of the General Electric Company plc, and in 1910 became its chairman.

He was created a baronet, of Witton in the County of Warwick, in the 1925 Birthday Honours and elevated to the peerage as Baron Hirst, of Witton in the County of Warwick, on 28 June 1934.

Hirst's eldest daughter Muriel married Leslie Gamage, the elder son of Arthur Walter Gamage, the founder of Gamages department store. Leslie joined GEC and became chairman and managing director after Hirst's death.

As both his son and his grandson died before Hirst, his baronetcy and peerage both became extinct on his death in 1943.

Coat of arms of Hugo Hirst, 1st Baron Hirst

Crest
A stag's head Proper collared and charged on the neck with three crescents interlaced Or.
Escutcheon
Per chevron Or and Gules in chief two roses Gules barbed and seeded Proper and in base upon a mount an oak tree also Proper.
Supporters
Dexter a horse sinister each charged on the shoulder with a thunderbolt Proper.
Motto
I Will

Peerage of the United Kingdom
New creation	Baron Hirst; 1934–1943	Extinct
Baronetage of the United Kingdom
New creation	Baronet (of Witton); 1925–1943	Extinct
