= Oppenheimer family =

South African business family

The Oppenheimer family is an Anglo–South African family best known for its longtime control of Anglo American and De Beers. Ernest Oppenheimer, a German immigrant to Britain and later to South Africa, founded the Anglo American Corporation in 1917 to mine the Witwatersrand for gold. He took control of De Beers in 1929 and became its chairman the same year, followed by his son Harry Oppenheimer in 1957 and his grandson Nicky Oppenheimer in 1998.

In 2011, the family sold its remaining 40 per cent stake in De Beers to Anglo American for $5.1 billion in cash. By that time the family's equity in Anglo American had fallen below 2 per cent.

The Oppenheimer family residence is the Brenthurst Estate in Parktown, Johannesburg.

== Family members ==
- Bernard Oppenheimer (1866–1921)
- Ernest Oppenheimer (1880–1957)
  - Harry Oppenheimer (1908–2000)
    - Mary Slack (born 1943)
    - Nicky Oppenheimer (born 1945)
  - Frank Leslie Oppenheimer (1910–1935)
- Otto Oppenheimer (1882–1948)
  - Philip Oppenheimer (1911–1995)
    - Anthony Oppenheimer (born 1937)

== See also ==
- Mining industry of South Africa
