= Brenthurst =

Brenthurst may refer to:

- Brenthurst Estate, the Johannesburg residence of the Oppenheimer family;
- Brenthurst Gardens, the partially public gardens of the estate;
- Brenthurst Library, the estate library;
- The Brenthurst Initiative, a proposal regarding black economic empowerment;
- The Brenthurst Foundation, established to promote the concepts of the initiative.
- Brenthurst Wealth Management, a South African financial services provider.
