= Bohdan Ben =

Ukrainian political scientist

Bohdan Ben (Ukrainian: Богдан Бень) is a Ukrainian political scientist, based in Lviv.

Ben is an author of multiple articles published in Ukrainian English-language newspapers Kyiv Post, and Euromaidan Press.

== Research ==
Bohdan Ben has received a bachelor's degree in political science from National University of Kyiv-Mohyla Academy. He is a researcher in the fields of ethics and social philosophy, as well as local governance.
