= Reactions to the 2022 Russian invasion of Ukraine =

UN General Assembly Resolution ES-11/1 vote on 2 March 2022 condemning the invasion of Ukraine and demanding a complete withdrawal of Russian troops. In favour Against Abstained Absent Non-member

On 24 February 2022, Russia invaded Ukraine in a major escalation of the Russo-Ukrainian War which began in 2014. The invasion caused Europe's largest refugee crisis since World War II, with more than 8.2 million Ukrainians fleeing the country and a third of the population displaced. The invasion also caused global food shortages. Reactions to the invasion have varied considerably across a broad spectrum of concerns including public reaction, media responses, and peace efforts.

== Summary ==
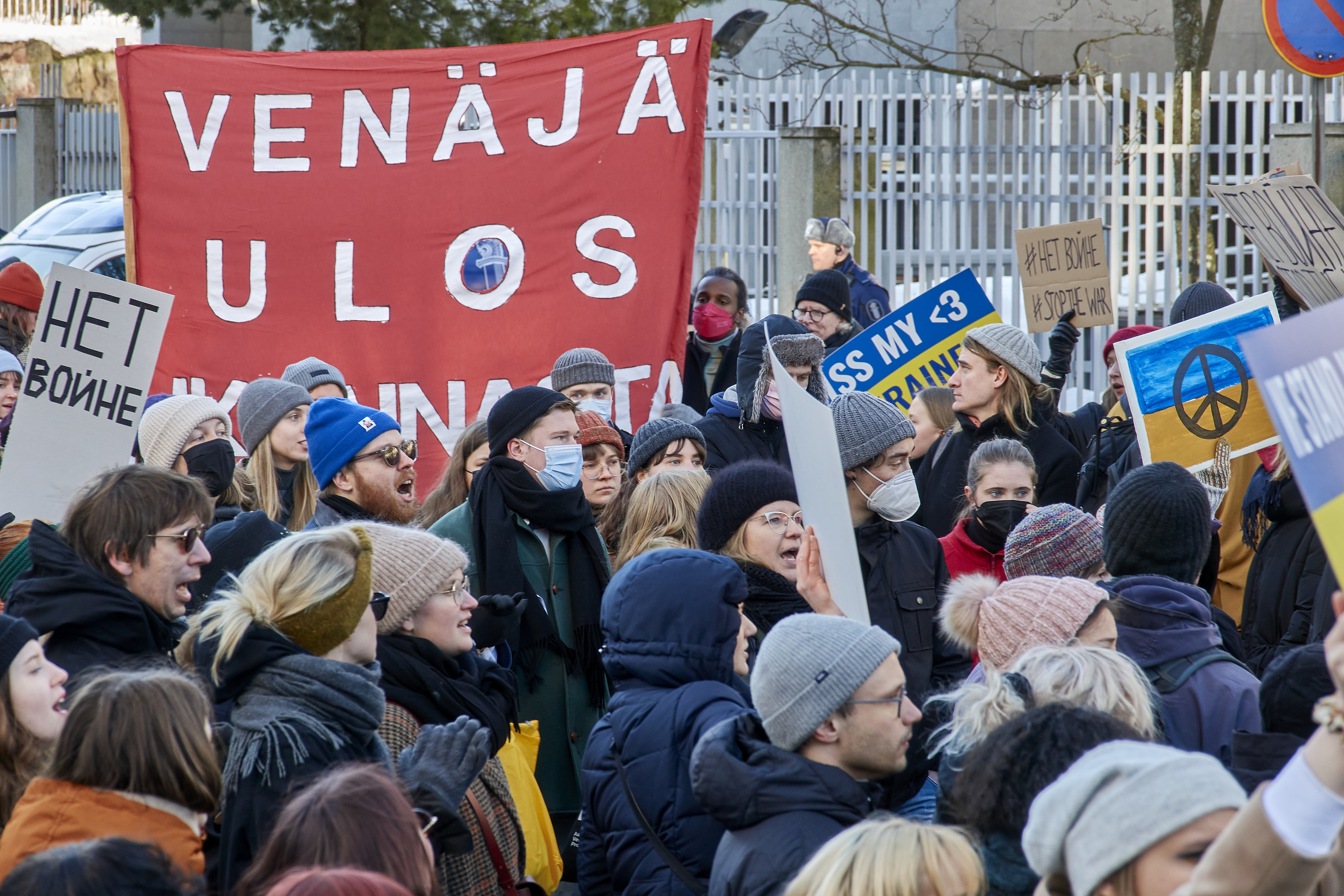
Anti-war protest in Helsinki 2022

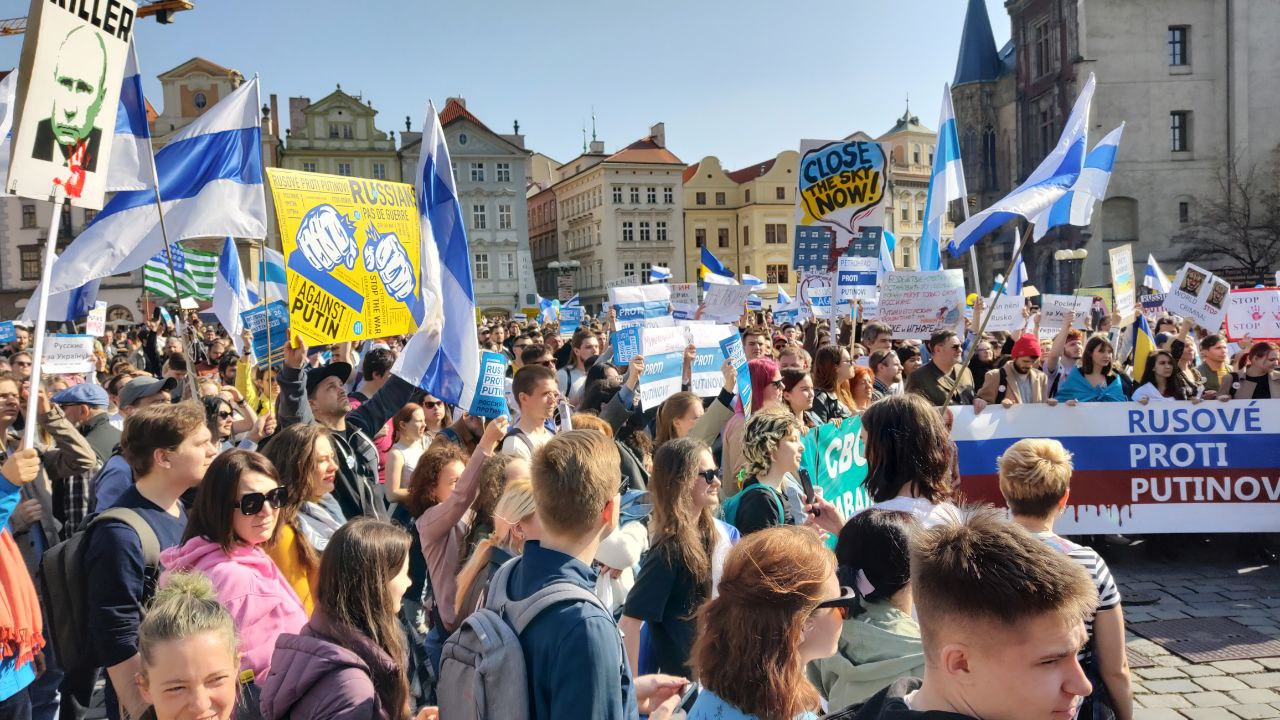
Protest by Russians living in the Czech Republic, 26 March 2022. The white-blue-white flag is a symbol of anti-war protests in Russia.

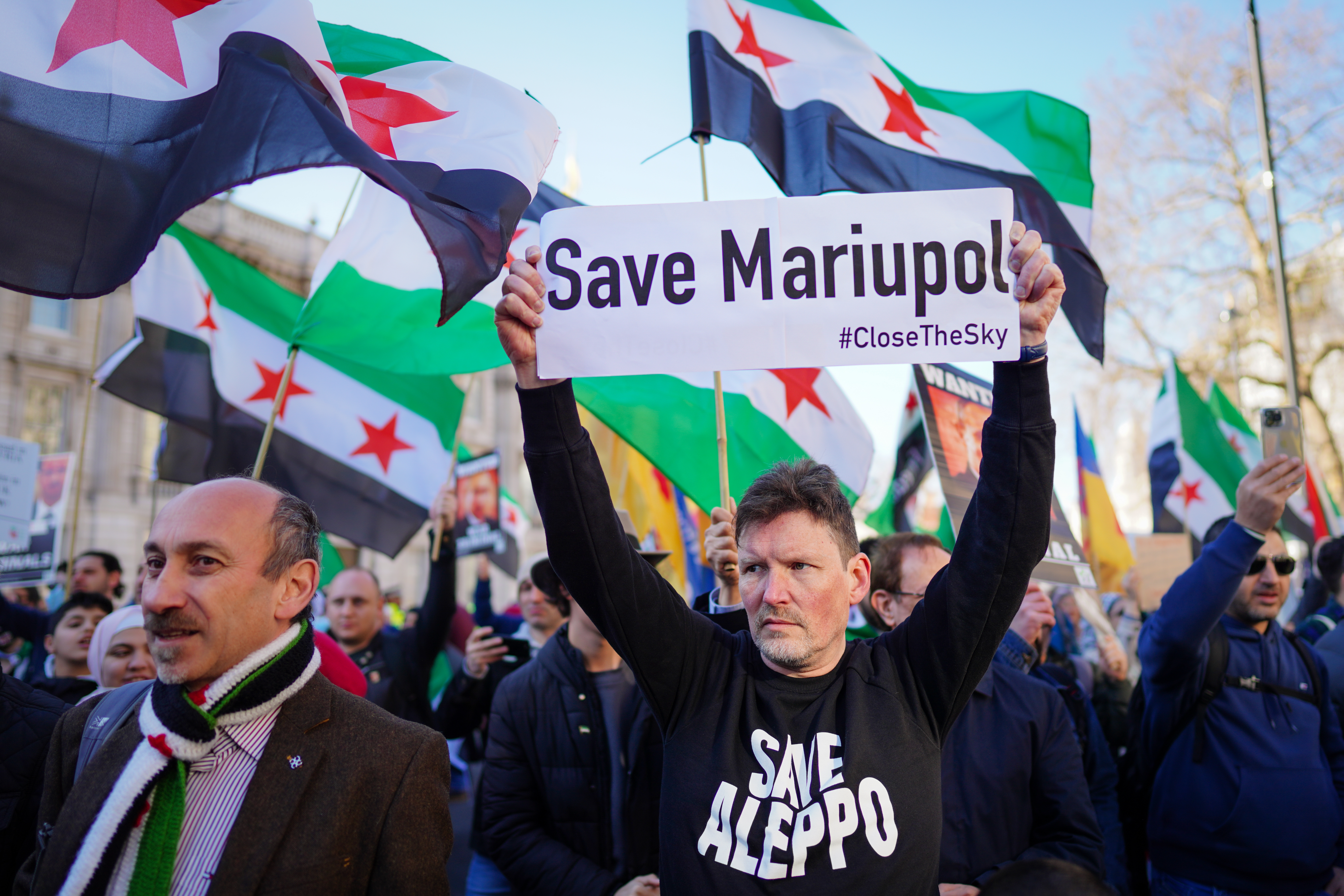
Protests against Russian bombing of Mariupol by Syrian activists in Central London, March 2022

The invasion received widespread international condemnation from governments and intergovernmental organisations, with reactions including new sanctions imposed on Russia, which triggered widespread economic effects on the Russian and world economies. The European Union financed and delivered military equipment to Ukraine. The bloc also implemented various economic sanctions, including a ban on Russian aircraft using EU airspace, a SWIFT ban on certain Russian banks, and a ban on certain Russian media outlets.

Non-government reactions to the invasion included widespread boycotts of Russia and Belarus in the areas of entertainment, media, business, and sport.

The head of the World Health Organization, Tedros Adhanom Ghebreyesus, has asked whether or not "the world really gives equal attention to black and white lives". He then proceeded to list other countries and compared them to the coverage of Ukraine: Ethiopia, Yemen, Afghanistan, and Syria.

There were also immediate worldwide protests against the invasion and daily protests in Russia itself. As well as the demonstrations, petitions and open letters were published in opposition to the war, and public figures, both cultural and political, released statements against the war. The protests were met with widespread repression by the Russian authorities. According to OVD-Info, at least 14,906 people were detained from 24 February to 13 March 2022. The Russian government cracked down on other forms of opposition to the war, including introducing widespread censorship measures and repression against people who signed anti-war petitions. In July 2022, Moscow city councillor Alexei Gorinov was jailed for seven years for criticizing Russia's invasion of Ukraine, the first time someone went to jail under the new Russian 2022 war censorship laws. Meanwhile, other Russians, including Alexandra Skochilenko and Vladimir Kara-Murza, await similar trials. As well as the protests, there were also reported instances of anti-Russian sentiment and discrimination against the Russian diaspora and Russian-speaking immigrants as a result of the war. Ukraine has decided to rename the streets of Ukrainian cities named after Russian historical figures like Tchaikovsky or Tolstoy. In some parts of Ukraine that were newly occupied by Russian armed forces, protests against the occupiers took place.

In China, India, Indonesia, Malaysia, Vietnam, Serbia, and the Arab regions, many social media users showed sympathy for Russian narratives due in part to distrust of US foreign policy, with Malaysian social media users stated that the MH17 shooting and 2020 Summer Paralympics incidents being the main reasons for supporting Russia. According to the Economist Intelligence Unit, two-thirds of the world's population live in countries that are neutral or leaning towards Russia. In March 2022, 98% of Ukrainians – including 82% of ethnic Russians living in Ukraine – said they did not believe that any part of Ukraine was rightfully part of Russia. At the end of April, a poll conducted in Russia by the Levada Center concluded the following: "74% of Russians support Russia's invasion in Ukraine and the actions of the Russian military. 19% of respondents said they did not support the actions of the Russian Federation. Meanwhile, 39% of respondents said that they were not following the war in Ukraine". Many respondents in Russia do not want to answer pollsters' questions for fear of negative consequences. When a group of researchers commissioned a survey on Russians' attitudes to the war in Ukraine, 29,400 of the 31,000 people they called refused to answer when they heard the question.

Pope Francis said that NATO may have caused Russia's invasion of Ukraine, because the alliance was "barking" at Russia's door. He also warned that the war in Ukraine was becoming like the Spanish Civil War, in which new and more powerful weapons were tested. He later implicitly accused Russia of an "armed conquest, expansionism and imperialism in Ukraine".

In March 2022, Antwerp mayor Bart De Wever said during a radio interview that Russian President Vladimir Putin will not end Russia's invasion of Ukraine, as he is a "psychopath" and a "madman", adding: "[Putin] said: ‘I will squash the Russians who are against me like mosquitoes’. When did I hear that before? I think here, 70 years ago." De Wever had earlier assessed that Vladimir Putin and Adolf Hitler were similarly motivated: "Germany was humiliated after the First World War, Russia after the Cold War. In both countries, an autocratic leader emerged with a clear ambition: to undo the humiliation. In Germany, it was Hitler, in Russia, Putin." De Wever went on to explain that this humiliation was taken personally by both men, who had each professionally represented their respective countries (Hitler as a soldier, and Putin as a KGB agent): “Both then unexpectedly resorted to irrational behavior. What the Sudetenland was to Hitler, Crimea was to Putin. There are many similarities.”

== Public reaction ==
The invasion received widespread public condemnation internationally. Protests and demonstrations were held worldwide including in many post-Soviet countries and some in Russia itself. Russian monuments across Europe were subject of vandalism with some even demolished. The Russian ambassador to Poland was pelted with red paint by pro-Ukraine protestors while laying flowers in a Russian military cemetery. The invasion became a viral phenomenon on social media and calls for mass boycotts of Russian culture and goods flooded multiple social media platforms. People from across the world tried to attack and shutdown Russian websites, particularly those operated by the Russian government.

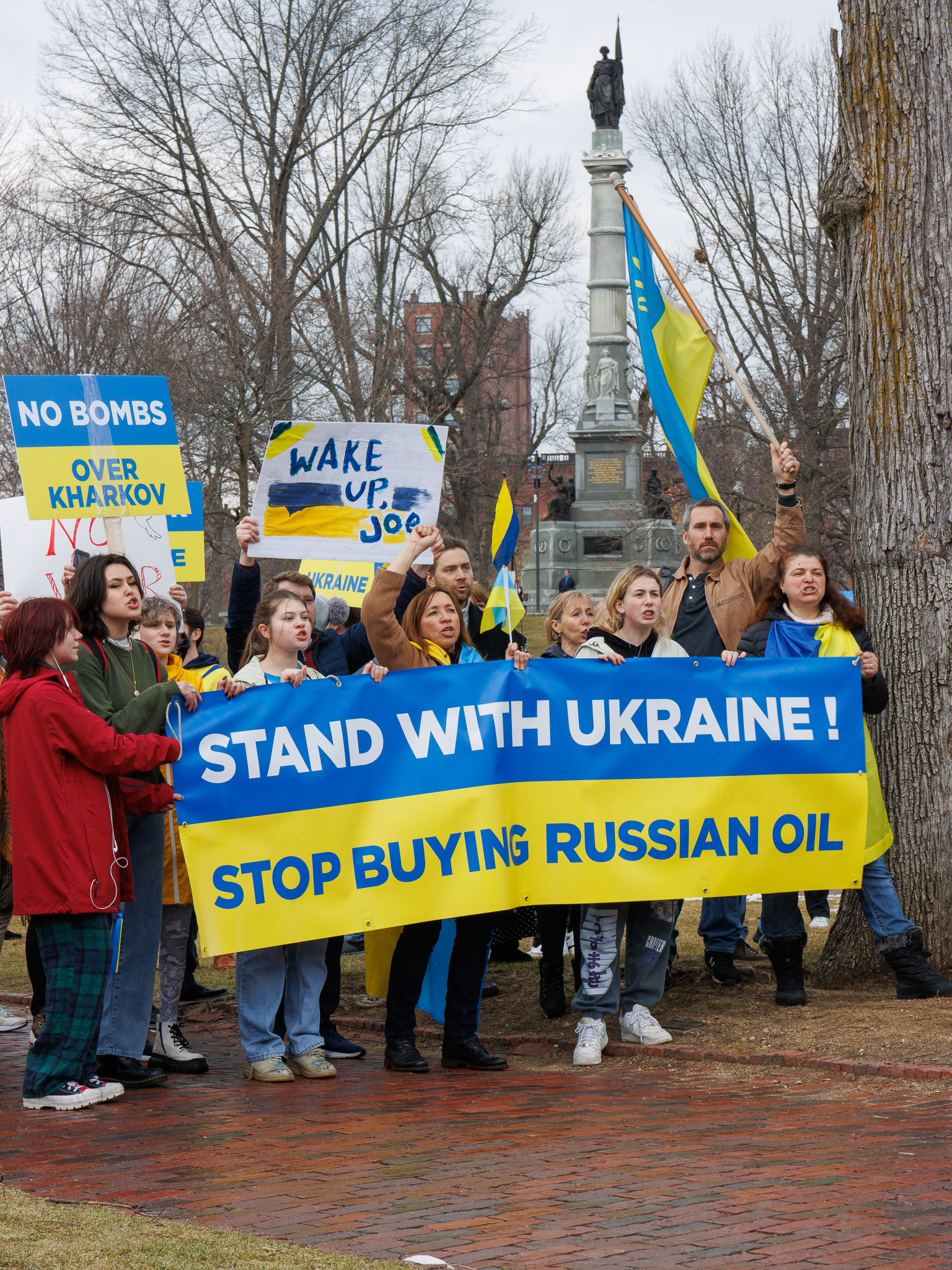
Protest on Boston Commons in support of Ukraine

Some Russians living in Europe and the United States reported that opposition to Russia's invasion of Ukraine had subjected them to anti-Russian sentiment including harassment and vandalism.

Russian sources reported that Russian students were being expelled by European universities, but the European University Association stated that none of its 800+ members had expelled Russians. A proposal by US Congressman Eric Swalwell to expel Russian students from US universities was not enacted.

In 2022, the Lebanese Foreign Ministry condemned Russia's military invasion of Ukraine and called on Moscow to "immediately halt military operations." Russia's embassy in Lebanon expressed surprise at this condemnation, releasing a statement that "The statement... surprised us [the Russian embassy] by violating the policy of dissociation and by taking one side against another in these events, noting that Russia spared no effort in contributing to the advancement and stability of the Lebanese Republic".

UK Prime Minister Boris Johnson among others has warned of the danger of "Ukraine fatigue" and "stressed the importance of allied nations showing they would stand by Kyiv for the long-term". According to the Rand Corporation, "Russia's strategy seems to be largely based on protraction: Let the war grind on, and eventually the United States and its allies will lose interest, and the Ukrainians will cave." Several European newspapers, working from leaked Russian intelligence documents and social media photos, described Russian efforts to exaggerate anti-Ukraine sentiment by photographing a few protestors holding anti-Ukraine signs against a backdrop of large demonstrations about other matters.

== Media coverage ==
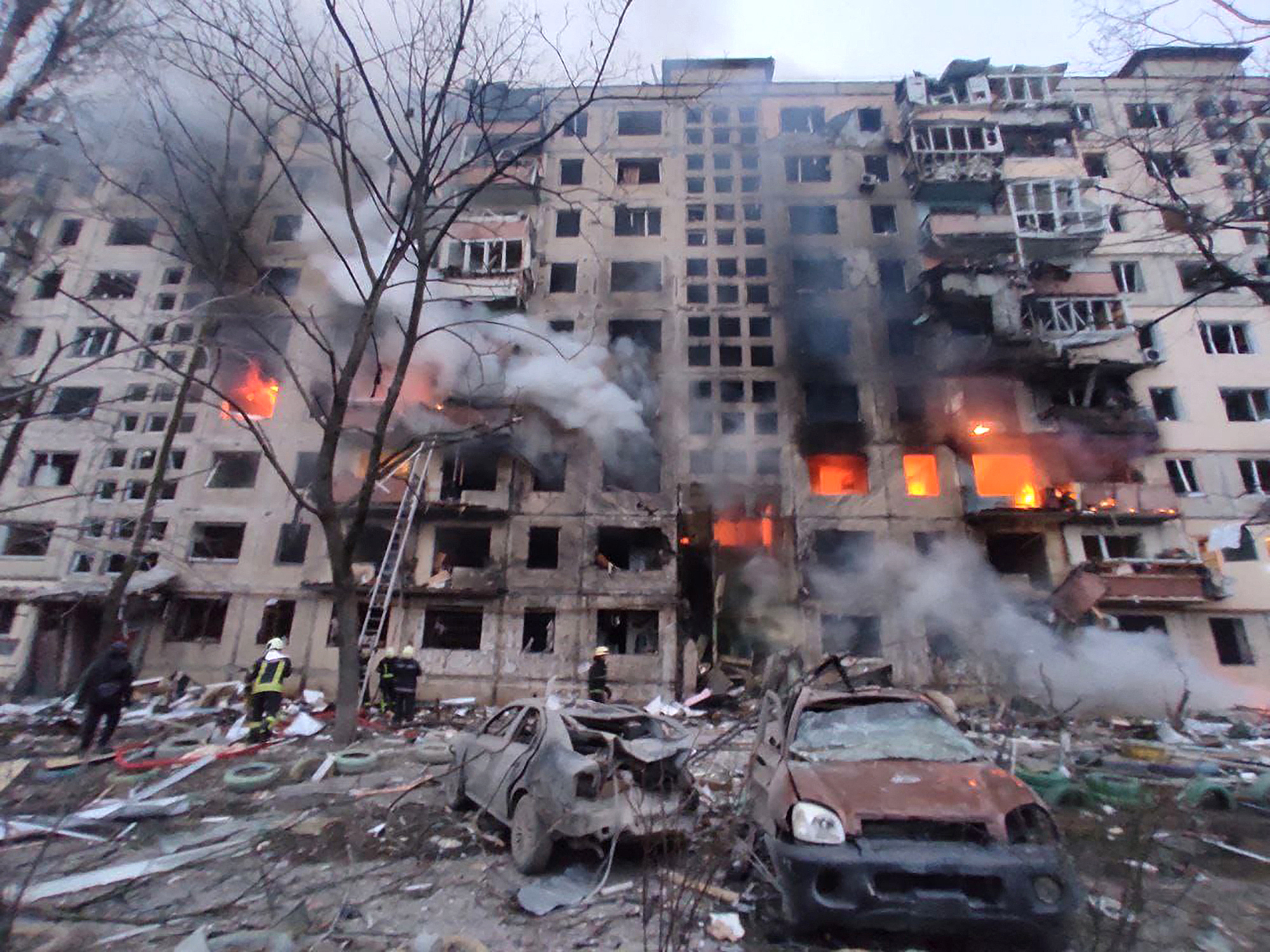
Russian state-controlled media systematically downplays both civilian and military losses, and denounces reports of attacks on civilians as "fake" or blames Ukrainian forces.

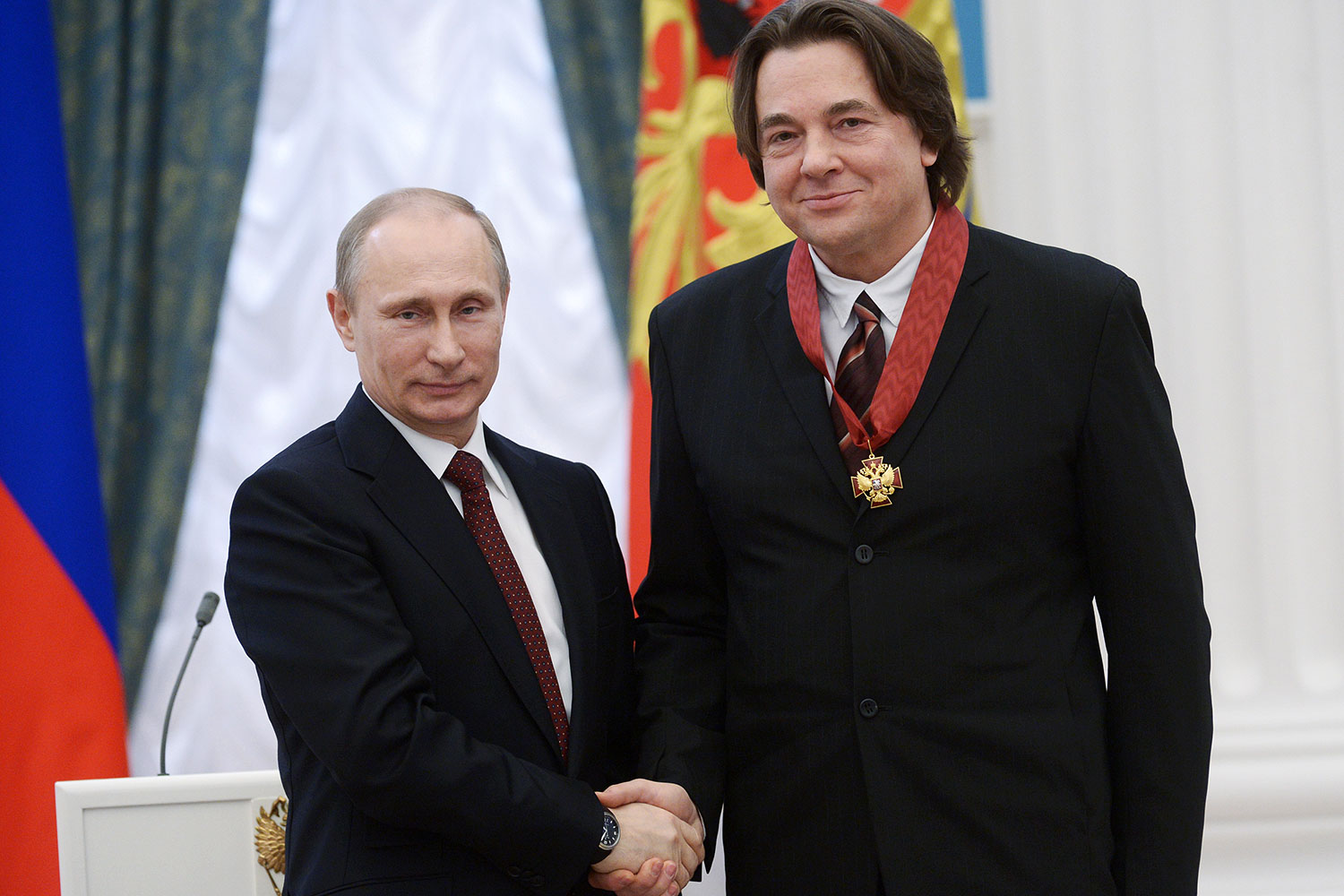
Putin and Konstantin Ernst, chief of Russia's main state-controlled TV station Channel One. About 85% of Russians get most of their information from Russian state media.

Social media users shared real-time information about the invasion.

Depictions of earlier events or other misinformation, sometimes deliberate, were also shared, in addition to authentic first-hand portrayals. While many outlets tagged these misleading videos and images as false content, other sites did not.

Putin introduced prison sentences of up to 15 years for publishing "fake news" about Russian military operations, and fines or up to three years prison for calling for sanctions, prompting most Russian outlets to stop reporting on Ukraine. The Russian censorship agency Roskomnadzor ordered media to only use information from Russian state sources, and to describe the war as a "special military operation". Roskomnadzor also restricted access to Facebook, after it refused to stop fact-checking posts by state-owned Zvezda, RIA Novosti, Lenta.ru, and Gazeta.Ru. Pro-Kremlin television pundits like Vladimir Solovyov and Russian state-controlled channels like Russia-24, Russia-1, and Channel One follow the government narrative. The state-controlled TV where most Russians get their news presented the invasion as a liberation mission. Echo of Moscow closed down, and Roskomnadzor blocked access to BBC News Russian, Voice of America, RFE/RL, Deutsche Welle, and Meduza, as well as Facebook and Twitter. A Moscow court demanded that Russian-language Wikipedia remove information about the invasion, and it fined the Wikimedia Foundation 5 million rubles for refusing to comply. The foundation was also fined 2 million rubles ($27,000) by a Russian court for failing to remove what was regarded by authorities as "misinformation" about the Russian military.

Ukrainian propaganda focused on awareness of the war and Ukraine's need for weapons. Official Ukrainian social media accounts targeted recruiting and international aid.

State-controlled media in China saw an opportunity for anti-American propaganda, and along with Cuban state media, amplified false claims of "secret US biolabs". Media outlets in Bulgaria, Serbia, and Iran repeated Russian propaganda, as did RT Actualidad in South America. Pro-government Turkish media blamed NATO and the US for the war. Pro-Fidesz media outlets in Hungary claimed that Ukraine provoked the war by becoming "a military base for America". Vietnam told reporters not to say "invasion", and to minimise coverage. South Africa's African National Congress endorsed the denazification narrative. Some Indonesian social media users and academics also spread Russian propaganda.

Some criticised the greater emphasis on events in Ukraine than on those in Afghanistan, Ethiopia, Iraq, Libya, Palestine, Syria, and Yemen, claiming racial bias and a racial "double standard" when it comes to news reporting.

== Legal implications ==
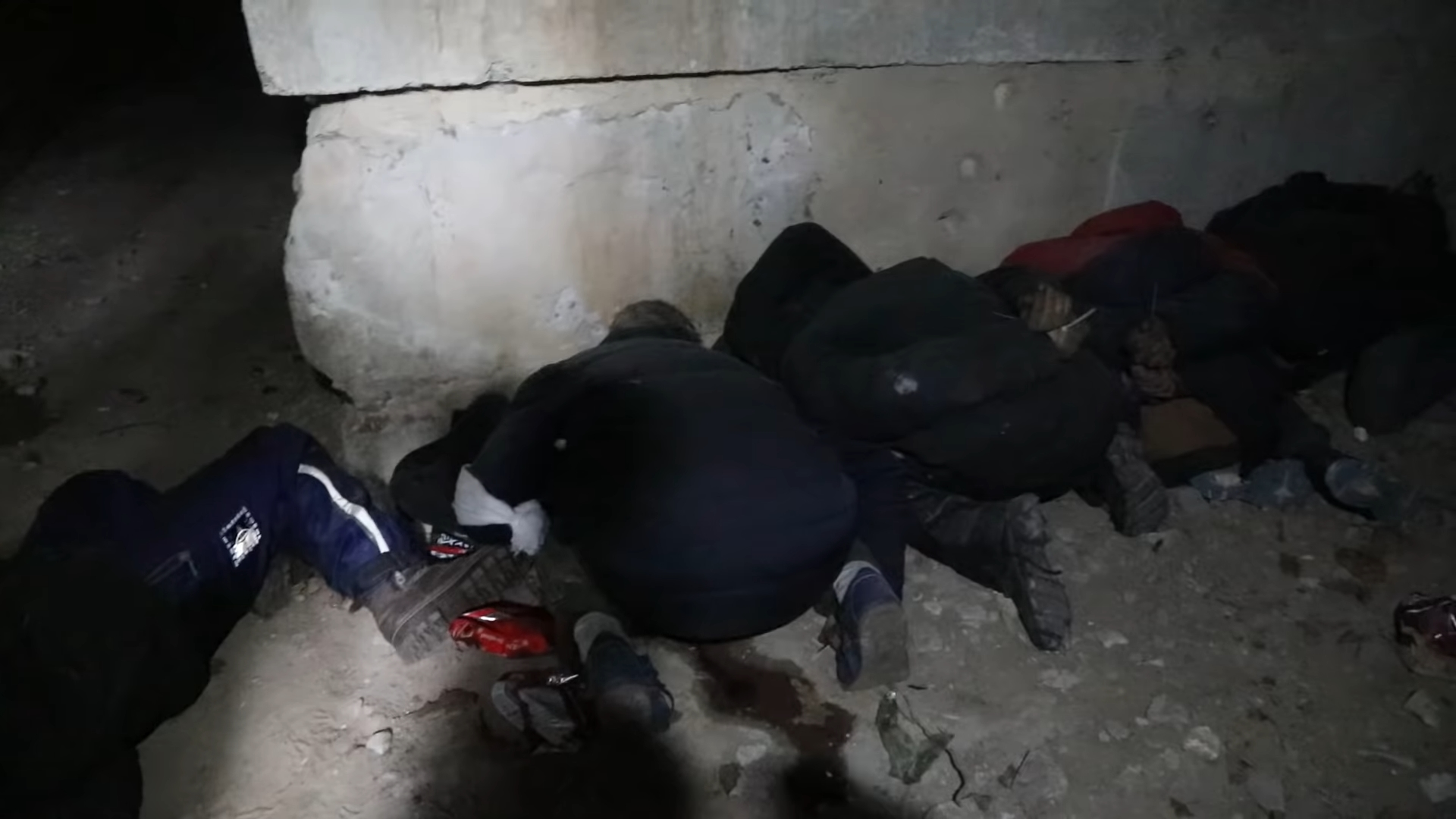
Executed people with wrists bound in plastic restraints, in a basement in Bucha

The Russian invasion of Ukraine has been widely regarded as an act of aggression that violated the Charter of the United Nations. In addition, Russia was accused of war crimes and crimes against humanity, and waging war in violation of international law, indiscriminately attacking densely populated areas and exposing civilians to unnecessary and disproportionate harm. Russian forces used cluster munitions, repudiated by most states because of their immediate and long-term danger to civilians. and fired other wide-area explosives like air-dropped bombs, missiles, heavy artillery shells and multiple launch rockets. Ukrainian forces reportedly also fired cluster munition rockets. Russian attacks damaged or destroyed homes, hospitals, schools and kindergartens the Zaporizhzhia Nuclear Power Plant, and 191 cultural properties such as historic buildings and churches. As of 25 March, the attacks had resulted in at least 1,035 civilian deaths and at least 1,650 civilian injuries. Russian forces were accused of forcibly deporting thousands of civilians to Russia, sexual assaults, and deliberately killing Ukrainian civilians. When Ukrainian forces recaptured Bucha in late March, evidence emerged of war crimes, including torture and deliberate killings of civilians, including children.

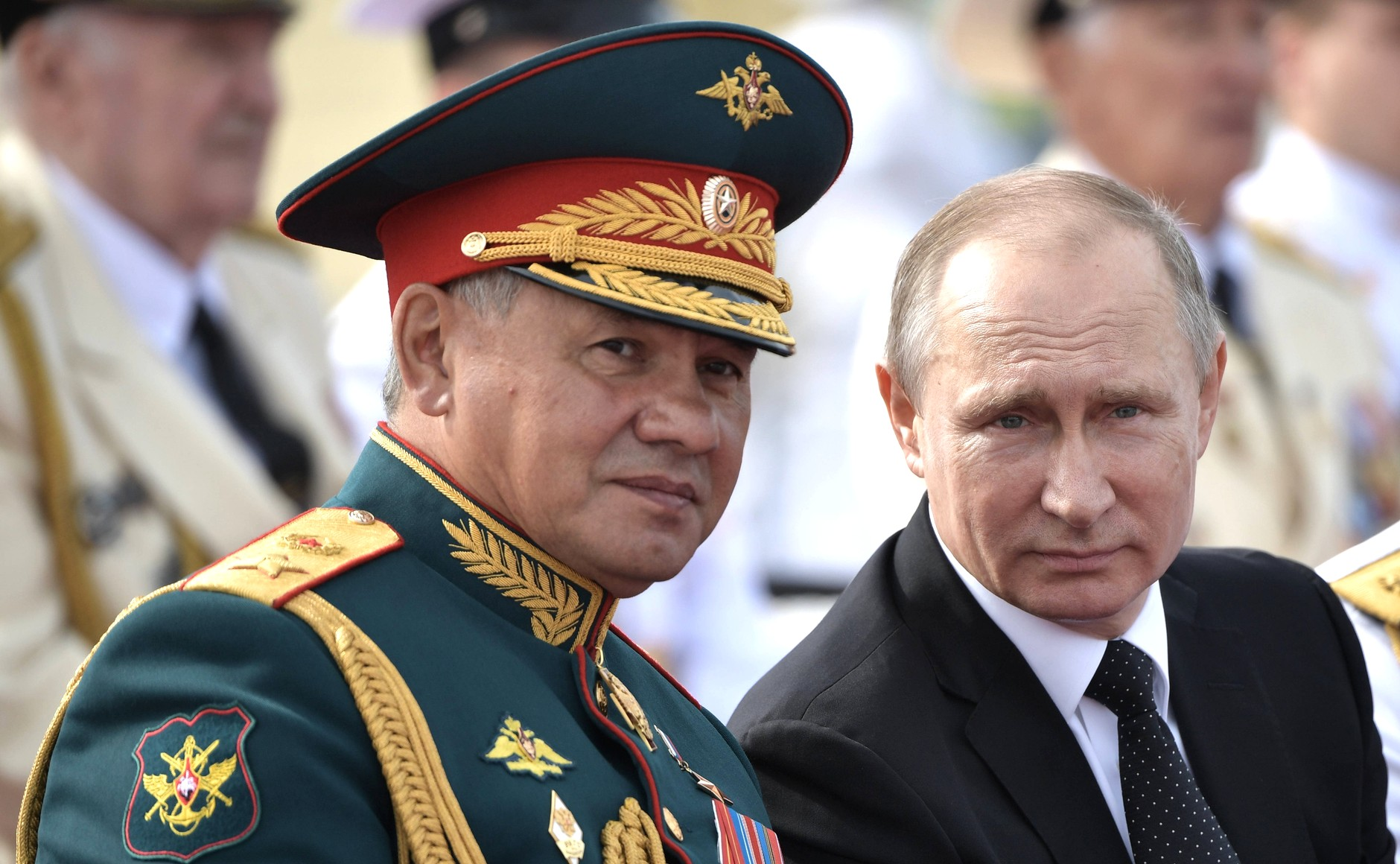
Putin and Russia's Defence Minister Sergei Shoigu. Ukraine has identified more than 600 suspected war criminals from Russia, including Shoigu.

The invasion also violated the Rome Statute, which created the International Criminal Court and prohibits "the invasion or attack ... or any annexation by the use of force". Russia withdrew from the statute in 2016 and does not recognise ICC authority, but thirty-nine member states officially referred the matter to the ICC, and Ukraine accepted ICC jurisdiction in 2014. On 2 March, Karim Ahmad Khan, prosecutor of the International Criminal Court, opened a full investigation into past and present allegations of war crimes, crimes against humanity, and genocide committed in Ukraine by any person from 21 November 2013 on. The ICC also set up an online portal for people with evidence to contact investigators, and sent investigators, lawyers and other professionals to Ukraine to collect evidence.

On 4 March 2022, the United Nations Human Rights Council created the International Commission of Inquiry on Ukraine, an independent committee of three human rights experts with a mandate to investigate violations of human rights and international humanitarian law in the invasion. In the first month of the invasion, the UN Human Rights Monitoring Mission in Ukraine, deployed by OHCHR to monitor all parties since 2014 using 60 UN human rights monitors, documented arbitrary detentions in Russian-occupied territories of 21 journalists and civil society activists, and 24 public officials and civil servants. They also expressed concern about reports and videos of ill-treatment, torture, and public humiliation of civilians and prisoners of war in territory controlled by Ukraine, allegedly committed by police officers and territorial defence forces. As of 15 July, the mission had documented approximately 271 cases of Russian troops forcibly detaining Ukrainians, with many of those detained being tortured, often by FSB officers, and with Russian mass detention of around 10,000 Ukrainians being likely.

In late March, Prosecutor General of Ukraine Iryna Venediktova stated that Ukrainian prosecutors had collected evidence for 2,500 "possible war crimes cases" and had "several hundred suspects". On 13 May the first war crimes trial began in Kyiv, of a Russian soldier who was ordered to shoot an unarmed civilian.

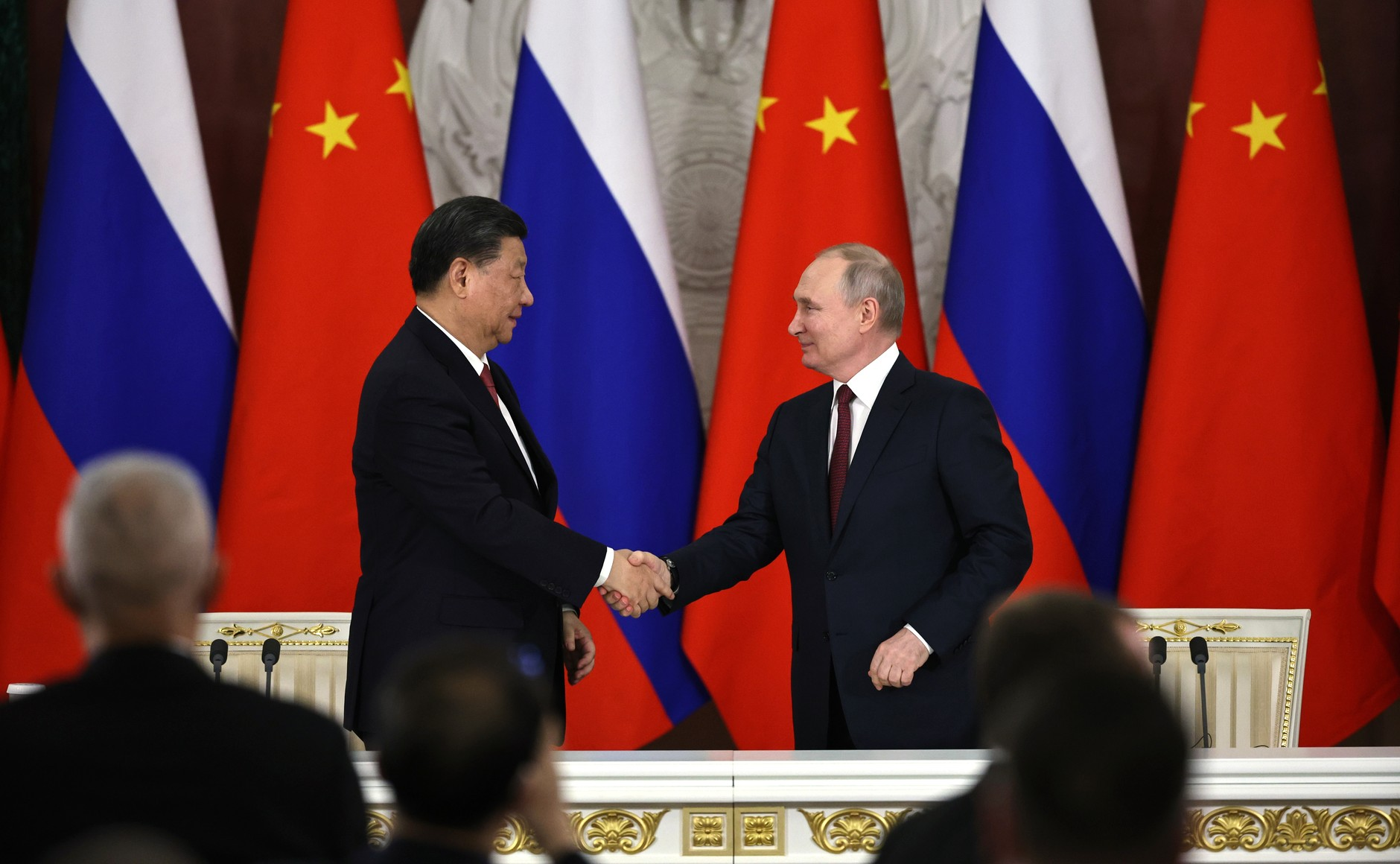
Putin welcomes CCP General Secretary Xi Jinping to Moscow, 21 March 2023. It was Putin's first international meeting since the ICC issued a warrant for his arrest.

Ukraine filed a lawsuit at the International Court of Justice (ICJ) accusing Russia of violating the 1948 Genocide Convention, which both Ukraine and Russia had signed, with false claims of genocide as a pretext for the invasion. The International Association of Genocide Scholars supported Ukraine's request that the ICJ direct Russia to halt its offensive in Ukraine. On 16 March, the ICJ ordered Russia to "immediately suspend the military operations" on a 13–2 vote, with the Russian and Chinese judges in opposition. The order is binding, but the ICJ has no means of enforcement.

On 27 May 2022, a report by New Lines Institute for Strategy and Policy and Raoul Wallenberg Centre for Human Rights stated that there were reasonable grounds to conclude that Russia breached two articles of the 1948 Genocide Convention, by publicly inciting genocide through denial of the right of Ukraine as a state and Ukrainians as a nation to exist, and by the forcible transfer of Ukrainian children to Russia, and that the serious risk of genocide triggers the legal obligation of all states to prevent it.

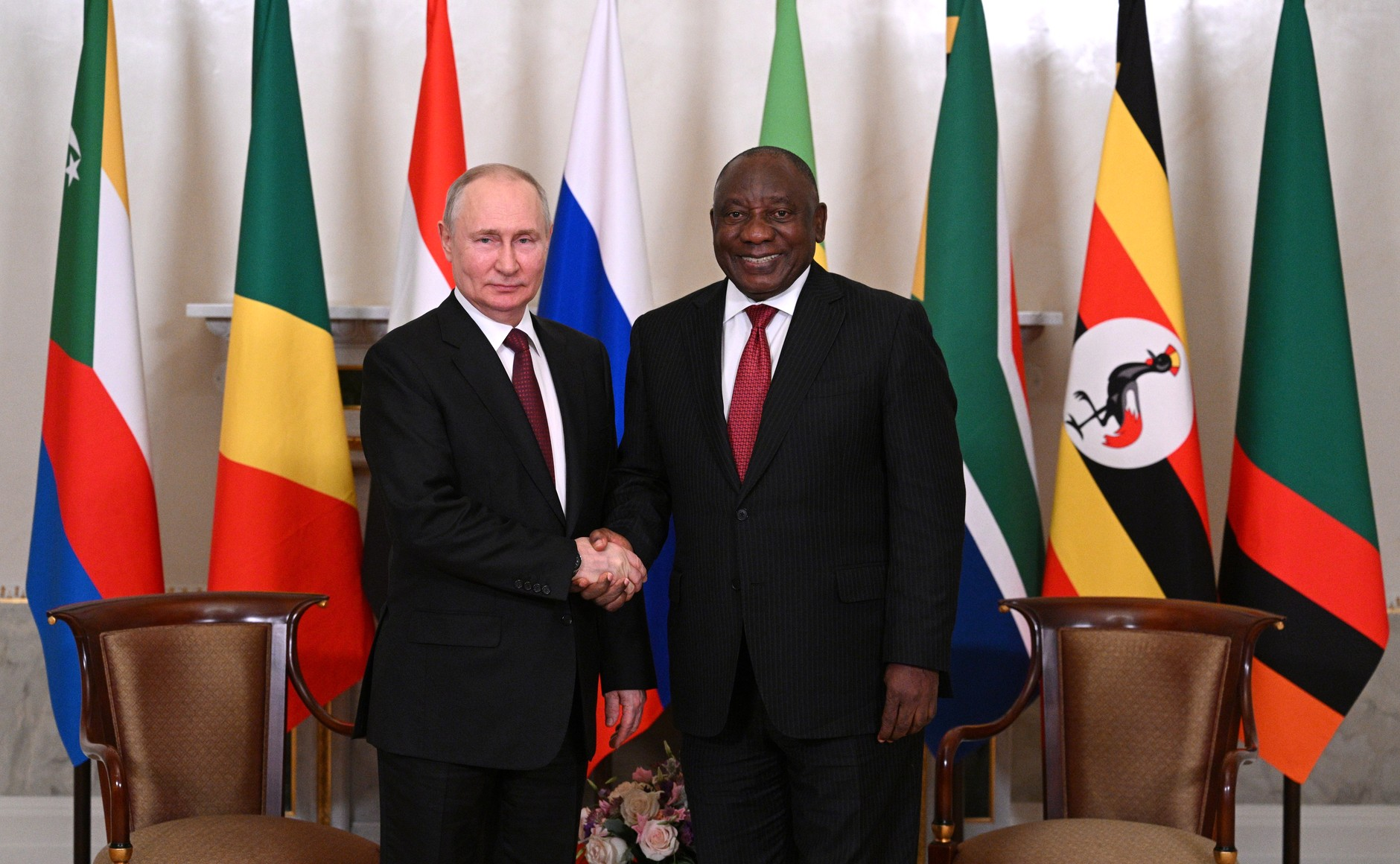
In May 2023, South Africa announced that it would grant diplomatic immunity to Vladimir Putin to attend the 15th BRICS summit despite the ICC's arrest warrant.

Under international criminal law's principle of universal jurisdiction, investigations were opened in Estonia, Germany, Lithuania, Poland, Slovakia, Spain, Sweden, and Switzerland.

On 16 July, Mikhail Mizintsev, chief of Russia's national defence control centre, has said during a briefing that over the last 24 hours, "28,424 people, including 5,148 children" have been evacuated from the Donbas and other parts of Ukraine to Russia. In total since 24 Feb, some "2,612,747 people, of which 412,553 are children" have been evacuated to Russia. Ukrainian authorities haven't been involved in these evacuations, both US and Ukrainian officials regard it as forcible deportations.

On 17 March 2023, the International Criminal Court issued a warrant for Putin's arrest, In May 2023, South Africa announced that it would grant diplomatic immunity to Vladimir Putin to allow him to attend the 15th BRICS Summit in Johannesburg despite the ICC arrest warrant. In July 2023, South African President Cyril Ramaphosa announced that Putin would not attend the summit "by mutual agreement", and that Russia would instead send Foreign Minister Sergei Lavrov.

== Russian response to sanctions ==
Russia Countries on Russia's "Unfriendly Countries List". Countries and territories on the list have imposed sanctions against Russia.

On 15 March, the Russian government targeted 313 Canadian individuals – mainly parliamentarians – with sanctions, and on 21 April banned 61 more Canadians.

On 14 June 2022, Russia banned 29 UK journalists, amongst others.

In June 2022, Russia imposed sanctions against Joe Biden's wife, Jill Biden, and daughter, Ashley Biden. They were amongst the list of 25 Americans who were restricted from entering Russian territory.

On 21 February 2023, Vladimir Putin announced Russia was suspending its participation in the New START treaty (2010) between the US and Russia, a day after U.S. president Joe Biden visited Ukraine.

== Polls ==
=== Global surveys ===
Ipsos, a French market research company, conducted several surveys across 28 countries around the world regarding the Russian invasion of Ukraine in November and December 2022. Nearly two-thirds (64%) of adults said that they still closely follow news about it. Global public opinion about the conflict has not changed much since the country's invasion. For example, about 66% of respondents agree that Russia should be excluded from international sports events although only 45% are in favor of "most stringent economic sanctions against Russia". 57% are in favor of supporting Ukraine until all Russian forces have withdrawn. Note that these numbers mean that the remainder supports the opposite opinion; rather, 42% say that their country should not interfere. However, 37% of respondents also said that their country should send weapons, although 64% also said that their country cannot afford to send financial support. These results are similar to a survey that Ipsos conducted in April 2022.

=== Belarus ===
In April 2022, only 11% of Belarusians supported sending Belarusian troops to Ukraine.

A study performed by Chatham House in May 2022 revealed that 32% of Belarusian respondents supported the invasion and 40% did not support the invasion.

=== Bulgaria ===
A YouGov poll conducted in April 2022 had 44% of Bulgarian respondents believing NATO was more responsible for the war, compared to 23% who believed Russia was more responsible. The percentage blaming NATO was higher than in the other 16 EU countries surveyed.

=== China ===
According to a survey of Chinese internet users published in April 2022 by the US-China Perception Monitor, 75% of respondents said they agreed or strongly agreed that supporting Russia in the conflict was in China's national interest. According to a survey conducted by Blackbox Research in March 2022, 71% of respondents from China expressed more sympathy for Ukraine over Russia and 3% expressed more sympathy for Russia.

According to a Genron NPO poll released in November 2022 on the topic of the Russian invasion, 39.5% of Chinese respondents said the Russian actions "are not wrong", 21.5% said "the Russian actions are a violation of the U.N. Charter and international laws, and should be opposed", and 29% said "the Russian actions are wrong, but the circumstances should be considered."

=== Finland ===
As a consequence of the Russian invasion, opinion polls in Finland found that public support for joining NATO climbed from 28% in February to 68% in March.

=== France ===
In May 2023 a poll by the Kantar Group showed 64% believing France should support Ukraine financially and militarily until Ukraine regained its pre 2014 territory, 25% believed support should cease.

=== Germany ===
In July 2022, 70% of German respondents backed Germany's support for Ukraine.

In March 2022, 90% of Germans said they did not trust Russia, up from 83% before the war started, while 63% trusted Ukraine and 60% trusted the United States. In 2023 62% of Germans expressed trust in Ukrainian President Volodymyr Zelenskyy and 67% expressed trust in U.S. President Joe Biden, while 92% mistrusted Russia's leadership, making Germany one of the 10 countries with most negative perceptions of Russia in the world.

A poll of Germans conducted by the Forsa and published in January 2023 found that over 80% believe it is more important to end the war through negotiations than for Ukraine to win, with only 18% disagreeing.

In May 2023 a poll of 5256 respondents by the Kantar Group showed 52% believing Germany should support Ukraine financially and militarily until Ukraine regained its pre 2014 territory, 35% believed support should cease.

An April 2024 poll of 1254 randomized eligible voter showed around 22% wish less military support for Ukraine with 42% supporting increased support. The political parties Bündnis Sahra Wagenknecht (BSW) and Alternative for Germany (AfD) – both popular in large part because they are seen as the only parties calling for a drastic change to German immigration policy, a key issue for German voters – are vocally critical of military support for Ukraine in media and, the former, in coalition negotiations.

=== India ===
According to a YouGov Cambridge poll, 27% of respondents in India said Russia was to blame for the war in Ukraine, while 28% of respondents blamed Western countries. 57% of respondents in India agreed and 9% disagreed with the statement: "Before the war started, Western countries were seeking to establish military infrastructure in Ukraine in order to threaten Russia."

=== Indonesia ===
A study performed by Airlangga University revealed that 71% of Indonesian netizens supported the invasion.

=== Italy ===
In May 2023 a poll by the Kantar Group showed 50% believing Italy should support Ukraine financially and militarily until Ukraine regained its pre 2014 territory, 31% believed support should cease.

=== Japan ===
In a historically unprecedented move, Japanese government announced on 2 March 2022 (i.e. less than a week after the Russian invasion started on 24 February 2022) a decision to accept an unspecified number Ukrainian evacuees. It is believed that the Japanese government used the term "evacuees" (hinansha) rather than "refugees" (nanmin) in order to prevent this case from becoming a precedent affecting Japan's future refugee policy and from leading to an increase of asylum-seekers arriving to the country.

As of February 6, 2023 Nippon Foundation has given aid to 1,921 Ukrainians in Japan.

According to an opinion poll conducted by Mainichi Shimbun on 23 April 2022, 69 per cent answered "[Japan] should accept more evacuees" while only 14 per cent answered "[Japan] does not need to accept evacuees anymore."

=== Jordan ===
In a public opinion poll commissioned by the Washington Institute and conducted in March/April 2023 by an independent regional firm, 78% of Jordanians agreed with the statement: "in the war going on now between Russia and Ukraine, the best outcome would be a Russian victory, including the annexation of a significant Ukrainian territory to Russia."

=== Kazakhstan ===
As a result of the Russian invasion of Ukraine, public opinion in Kazakhstan has turned against Russia. According to a poll conducted by Demoscope, in November 2022, 22% of respondents expressed support for Ukraine and 13% of respondents expressed support for Russia, down from 39% in March 2022.

=== Netherlands ===
In May 2023 a poll by the Kantar Group showed 58% believing the Netherlands should support Ukraine financially and militarily until Ukraine regained its pre 2014 territory, 20% believed support should cease.

=== Russia ===
Polling in Russia is a challenge due to the autocratic nature of the Putin regime, which generates effects like self-censorship. This was worsened by military censorship post-invasion. A majority of Russians polled supported the war prior to and immediately after the invasion, according to different measures by different polls in February and March 2022. A pre-invasion poll, conducted on 7–15 February by the British agency Savanta ComRes for CNN, found that approximately half of respondents agreed that Moscow should "use military force to prevent Kiev from joining NATO." Another two-thirds stated that they think Russians and Ukrainians are "one people," compared to only 28% of Ukrainians.

Another poll, conducted by the Russian Levada Center on 17–21 February, found that 52% of Russians polled expressed negative sentiments towards Ukraine. 60% believed that the United States and NATO are responsible for the escalation in Eastern Ukraine, while only 4% blamed Russia. The polls also suggested that public approval of Putin had surged by 13 percentage points since December 2021, a rally 'round the flag effect, with almost three-quarters (71%) supporting his leadership by February 2022.

In late February and mid-March 2022, two polls were conducted by a group of independent Russian sociologists to survey Russians' sentiments about the invasion; the results were obtained by Radio Liberty. The polls showed that just over 71% of Russians surveyed expressed positive emotions regarding the invasion of Ukraine, such as "pride, joy, respect, trust, and hope". Older respondents were more likely to support the invasion, with Russians over 35 being more likely to express positive emotions, and with these sentiments being even more prominent in those over 55, in which category more than half supported the invasion. Those under 18 were more "disappointed and anxious" about the war than other age groups; Russians aged 18–24 were more likely to feel indifference. The differences between the first and second polls show an increase in the number of people supporting the "special military operation" and DPR and LPR independence. The polls also revealed that a third of Russians surveyed strongly believe that Putin is "working in their interests," and another 26% believe that is true "to some extent." Most Russians polled think that it would be best if Putin stayed president for "as long as possible."

Another poll by The Washington Post, conducted a week into the invasion, showed similar results, with 58% approving the invasion while 23% opposed it. A private survey agency, Russian Field, likewise reported that 59% of respondents supported "Russian military action in Ukraine" in polls conducted from 26 to 28 February 2022. According to the poll, of 18-to-24-year-olds, only 29% supported the invasion.

At the end of March, a poll conducted in Russia by the Levada Center found the following: When asked why they think the military operation is taking place, 43% of respondents stated it was to protect and defend civilians, ethnic Russians or Russian speakers in Ukraine, 25% to prevent an attack on Russia, 21% to get rid of nationalists and "denazify" Ukraine, and 3% to incorporate Ukraine and/or the Donbas region into Russia.

As detected by the polls, some observers noted a "generational struggle" among Russians over the war, with younger Russians generally opposed, and older Russians more likely to accept the narrative of state-controlled media in Russia. Kataryna Wolczuk, an associate fellow of Chatham House's Russia and Eurasia programme, said, "[Older] Russians are inclined to think in line with the official 'narrative' that Russia is defending Russian speakers in Ukraine, so it's about offering protection rather than aggression."

The Kremlin's analysis concluded that public support for the war was broad but not deep, and that most Russians would accept anything Putin would call a victory. In September 2023, the head of the VTsIOM state pollster Valery Fyodorov said in an interview that only 10-15% of Russians actively supported the war, and that "most Russians are not demanding the conquest of Kyiv or Odesa."

=== Slovakia ===
A September 2022 survey conducted by MNFORCE, Seesame agencies and the Slovak Academy of Sciences found that in measuring with a 10-point scale, more than half of Slovak respondents said they tended to favour a Russian victory compared to a third saying they tended towards a Ukrainian one.

=== Lithuania ===
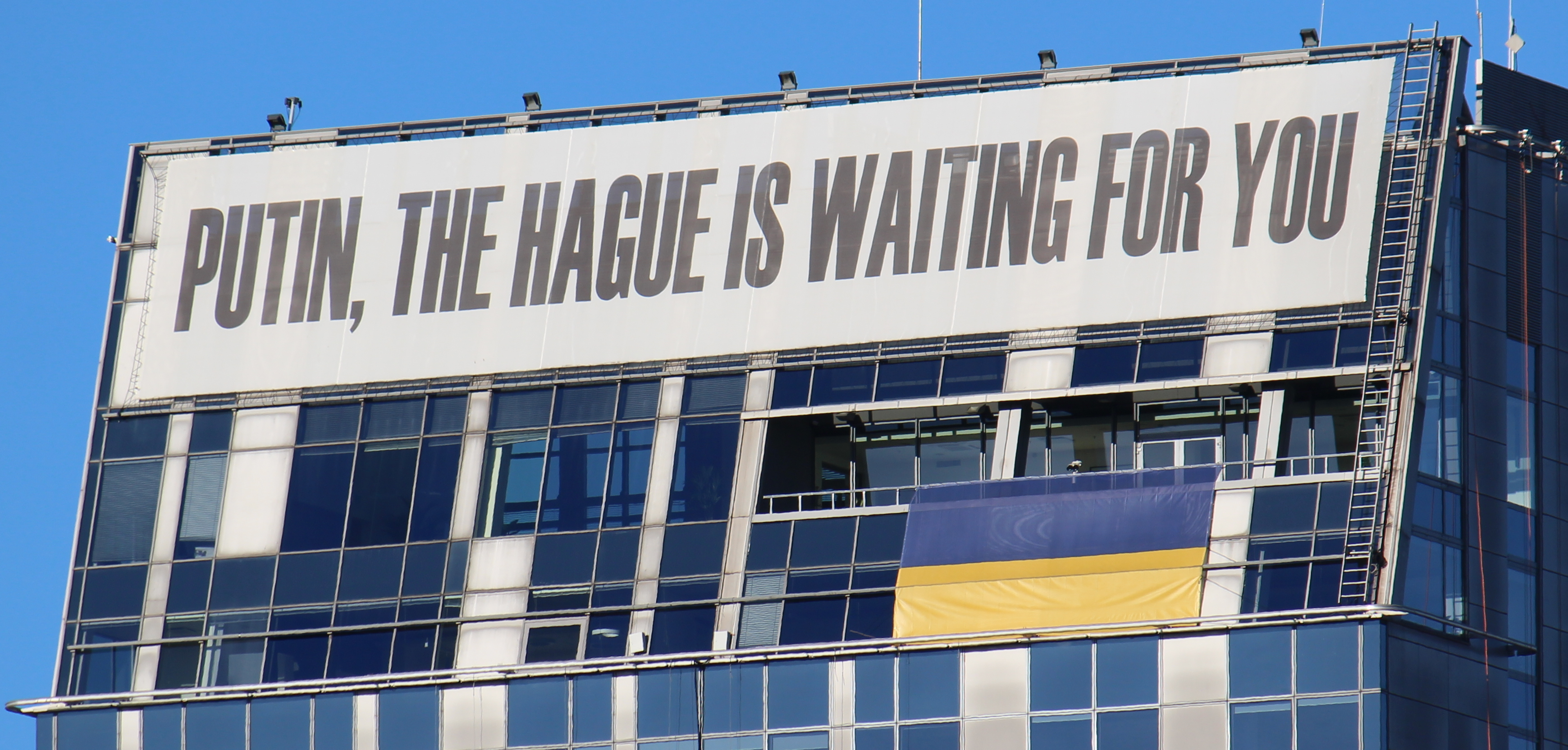
Vilnius City Municipality Building with a banner "Putin, The Hague is waiting for you" in Vilnius, Lithuania

In 2023 poll 84% of respondents in Lithuania said that Russia is the most guilty for the war in Ukraine, while 6% said that the United States are the most guilty for the war in Ukraine. In another 2023 poll eight out of ten respondents in Lithuania evaluated the Ukrainian President Volodymyr Zelenskyy favorably (46% very favorably, 35% rather favorably), while the Russian President Vladimir Putin was evaluated favorably by only 3% of respondents in Lithuania (1% very favorably, 2% rather favorably, 74% very unfavorably, 18% rather unfavorably, 5% had no opinion). According to a May–June 2023 poll, 89% of Lithuanian citizens support the financial support provided to Ukraine.

=== South Africa ===
A June 2023 poll by Ipsos found that 56% of South Africans view Russia's invasion of Ukraine as being against the principles of international law and that 61% thought that Russia was guilty of war crimes in Ukraine. It also found that 44% of respondents agreed with the view that Russia was the aggressor whilst 43% disagreed with this view. 56% of respondents agreed with the view that African countries should not take sides in the war. The survey found that overall 18% of respondents supported Russia, 23% supported Ukraine, and 59% were undecided or neutral.

A November 2022 survey by the Brenthurst Foundation found that 74.3% of South Africans viewed the Russian invasion as "an act of aggression that must be condemned" whilst 12.7% viewed it as "an acceptable use of force".

=== Sweden ===
A YouGov poll showed that in February 2023, 63% of respondents in Sweden wanted to support Ukraine in a war with Russia until Russian troops leave all occupied territories.

=== Turkey ===
According to a YouGov Cambridge survey, 26% of respondents in Turkey blamed Russia for the war in Ukraine, while 22% of respondents blamed Western countries. 50% of respondents in Turkey agreed and 11% disagreed with the statement: "Before the war started, Western countries were seeking to establish military infrastructure in Ukraine in order to threaten Russia."

=== Ukraine ===
More than 90% of Ukrainians supported the actions of President Volodymyr Zelenskyy, including more than 90% in western and central Ukraine and more than 80% in Russian-speaking regions in eastern and southern Ukraine. At the end of 2021, 75% of Ukrainians said they had a positive attitude toward ordinary Russians, while in May 2022, 82% of Ukrainians said they had a negative attitude toward ordinary Russians.

In March 2022, a week after the start of the Russian invasion of Ukraine, 82% of ethnic Russians living in Ukraine said they did not believe that any part of Ukraine was rightfully part of Russia, according to Lord Ashcroft's polls which did not include Crimea and the separatist-controlled part of Donbas. 65% of Ukrainians – including 88% of those of Russian ethnicity – agreed that "despite our differences there is more that unites ethnic Russians living in Ukraine and Ukrainians than divides us."

In the poll conducted by the Kyiv International Institute of Sociology (KIIS) between 13 and 18 May 2022, 82% of Ukrainians said they did not support any territorial concessions to Russia, even if that meant prolonging the war. Another KIIS poll conducted in September 2022 found that 87% of Ukrainians opposed any territorial concessions to Russia. A Gallup poll conducted in Ukraine in early September 2022 showed that 70% of Ukrainians wanted to continue the war with Russia until victory was achieved, while 26% supported negotiations to end the war as soon as possible. According to an opinion poll conducted in July 2022, 58% of Ukrainians said that Crimea must be returned to Ukraine.

A poll conducted by the Razumkov Centre between February and March 2023 found that 97% of residents of central Ukraine and 90% of residents of eastern Ukraine had a negative view of Russia. Respondents expressed negative attitudes most often towards Russia – 94%, Belarus – 81%, Iran – 73.5%, China – 60%, and Hungary – 46.5%. The survey found that 94% of Ukrainian respondents expressed a positive attitude towards Poland. Next comes Great Britain – 91%, Lithuania – 91%, Estonia – 90%, Latvia – 90%, and Canada – 90%.

=== United States ===
A poll conducted by NPR/Ipsos between 18 and 21 March 2022 found that only 36% of Americans approved the Biden administration's response to the invasion. An overwhelming 73 percent of Americans polled in October say the United States should continue to support Ukraine despite Russian threats to use nuclear weapons.

According to a Quinnipiac University national poll of adults released on 13 April 2022, 82% of American respondents called Russian President Vladimir Putin a war criminal, while 10% thought he was not a war criminal.

A Chicago Council survey of US adults conducted in July 2022 found that 38% of American respondents would support sending US troops to defend Ukraine.

A 2023 survey in the United States published by The Associated Press-NORC Center for Public Affairs Research shows that support for providing arms and direct economic aid to Ukraine is declining. According to a 2023 CNN poll, 55% of Americans said the US Congress should not approve additional funding to support Ukraine, while 45% would support additional funding.

A Gallup poll conducted in June 2023 found that 62% of American respondents wanted to support Ukraine in regaining territory that Russia had captured, even if it meant prolonging the war between Russia and Ukraine, while 32% wanted to end the war as quickly as possible, even if it meant allowing Russia to keep the territory it conquered and annexed in southeastern Ukraine.

== See also ==
- Government and intergovernmental reactions to the Russian invasion of Ukraine
- List of military aid to Ukraine during the Russo-Ukrainian War
- Non-government reactions to the Russian invasion of Ukraine
- Reactions to the 2021–2022 Russo-Ukrainian crisis
- Peace negotiations in the Russian invasion of Ukraine
- Red lines in the Russo-Ukrainian War
- International reactions to the war in Donbas
