= Jonathan Oppenheimer =

South African businessman

- Born: 18 November 1969 (age 56); South Africa
- Education: Harrow School; Christ Church, Oxford
- Occupation: Businessman
- Spouse: Jennifer Ward (died 2017)
- Children: 3
- Parent(s): Nicky Oppenheimer; Orcillia "Strilli" Lasch

Jonathan M. E. Oppenheimer (born 18 November 1969) is a South African billionaire businessman and conservationist, and the executive chairman of Oppenheimer Generations, a former executive of De Beers and a former vice-president of his family's firm, Anglo American plc.

== Early life ==
Jonathan is the son of former De Beers chairman Nicky Oppenheimer; he is the great-grandson of Anglo-American founder Ernest Oppenheimer, who was the first generation of the family to chair (from 1929) the De Beers diamond mining company in South Africa, founded by Cecil Rhodes in 1888.

He was educated at Harrow School and Christ Church, Oxford. He played first-class cricket for Oxford University Cricket Club.

== Career ==
Jonathan Oppenheimer began his career working at N M Rothschild & Sons, then moved to Anglo American, where he became senior vice-president, in 1999. After leaving Anglo American in 2000, he filled numerous senior roles at De Beers diamond mining company in Southern Africa and London until 2012. He was the third generation of his family to lead De Beers. He was also involved in the transactions to de-list De Beers, in 2001, and to sell the Oppenheimer family stake to Anglo American, in 2012. This sale concluded 85 years of the Oppenheimer family's controlling position in the world's diamond trade. He is currently the director of E. Oppenheimer & Son Ltd.

In 2003, Jonathan and Nicky Oppenheimer published the Brenthurst Initiative, a policy paper on economic development across South Africa. This led to the launch of the Brenthurst Foundation the following year.

Alongside his father he founded Oppenheimer Generations, with interests in various companies and non-profits such as the Harambe Entrepreneur Alliance. As Executive Chairman of Oppenheimer Generations, Jonathan is actively involved in all aspects of the family’s private, commercial, and thought leadership activities, including: Oppenheimer Partners, Oppenheimer Generations Asia, Nianova, Shangani Holistic, the Brenthurst Foundation, Oppenheimer Generations Foundation, Oppenheimer Generations – Research & Conservation.

== Other activities ==
Oppenheimer has been involved in many aspects of his family’s activities, including establishing the Brenthurst Foundation, a Johannesburg-based think-tank which examines ways to drive Africa's sustainable growth, and the formation of Tana Africa Capital, a joint venture between the Oppenheimer family and Temasek Holdings (Singapore) to pursue African consumer goods business opportunities.

He has sat on boards and advisory panels, including the Presidential Advisory Committee on the Economy (Malawi), established by the Brenthurst Foundation, and Umicore, a listed specialty chemicals company, as a non-executive director.

Oppenheimer purchased Tswalu Kalahari Reserve, immediately ended hunting, and improved conditions for wild animals found there. World Wide Fund for Nature recognized Oppenheimer's conservation work in 2007.

In January 2018, Jonathan joined the Board of Trustees of the Carnegie Endowment for International Peace (CEIP).

On 23 March 2020 Nicky and Jonathan Oppenheimer announced their commitment to tackle the unfolding health crisis in South Africa, and highlighted the exceptional challenges that small businesses were facing. They pledged to donate R1 billion to extend a financial lifeline to employees of small, medium and micro-sized enterprises (SMMEs).

On 31 March 2020 the South African Future Trust (SAFT) was established with this initial donation through the Oppenheimer Generations Foundation, and it has subsequently attracted further donations from foundations, corporates and individuals to the value of just over R134 million. The Trust’s immediate aim was to extend direct financial support to SMME employees at risk of losing their jobs or suffering serious loss of income due to the pandemic and subsequent national lockdown.

== Personal life ==
Oppenheimer was married to Jennifer Ward until her death in 2017. He has three children. In 2022 Jonathan re-married.
