= Harry Oppenheimer Agricultural High School =

Location
- Limburg, Limpopo; South Africa
- Coordinates: 23.7967°S 28.8963°E

Information
- Type: Public, Co-educational, Secondary school
- Motto: Tirelong ya setšhaba (Serving the community)
- Established: 1982
- Colour(s): Red, yellow
- Website: www.hoahs.co.za

Harry Oppenheimer Agricultural High School is a public secondary school with a focus on agricultural education located in Limburg, approximately 47 kilometres (29 mi) north of Mokopane in Limpopo, South Africa.

The school was established by South African businessman and philanthropist Harry Oppenheimer as a donation to the then government of Lebowa.

It has been recognised as a top-performing school within the Limpopo province.
