= Anthony Oppenheimer =

British diamond dealer and racehorse owner (born 1937)

- Born: Anthony Ernest Oppenheimer; June 1937 (age 88); United Kingdom
- Occupations: Diamond dealer, racehorse owner
- Spouses: Penny Barker; Antoinette Oppenheimer
- Children: 3
- Parent: Sir Philip Oppenheimer
- Relatives: Otto Oppenheimer (grandfather)

Anthony Ernest Oppenheimer (born June 1937) is a British diamond dealer and racehorse owner.

== Early life ==
He was born in June 1937, the son of Sir Philip Oppenheimer, and his wife Pamela Fenn Stirling.

== Career ==
Oppenheimer was president of De Beers Group.

== Racehorse owner ==
Oppenheimer is a prominent owner and breeder of racehorses and owns Hascome & Valiant Stud in Newmarket. Famous horses under his ownership include Golden Horn, who won the 2015 Epsom Derby and Cracksman who won the 2017 Champion Stakes. A previous chair of the Thoroughbred Breeders Association, Oppenheimer was awarded the Devonshire and Dominion bronzes in 2020 to recognise outstanding contribution and commitment to the British racing and breeding industry.

=== Major wins as an owner ===
Great Britain

- British Champions Fillies and Mares Stakes - Star Catcher (2019)
- Champion Stakes - (2) - Cracksman (2017, 2018)
- Coronation Cup - (1) - Cracksman (2018)
- Coronation Stakes - (2) - Rebecca Sharp (1997), Balisada (1999)
- Eclipse Stakes - Golden Horn (2015)
- Epsom Derby - Golden Horn (2015)

France

- Prix de l'Arc de Triomphe - Golden Horn (2015)
- Prix d'Ispahan - Sasuru (1997)
- Prix Ganay - Cracksman (2018)
- Prix Vermeille - Star Catcher (2019)

Ireland

- Irish Champion Stakes - Golden Horn (2015)
- Irish Oaks - Star Catcher (2019)

== Personal life ==
Oppenheimer married Penelope Walker in 1965, but they divorced in 1983, following her affair with Captain Fred Barker, a Singer sewing machine heir.

They had three daughters, Sophie, Emily and Arabella.

He later married Antoinette Lucas.
