= Euromaidan Press =

Internet-based English newspaper

- Type: Online newspaper
- Format: Website
- Founder(s): Alya Shandra; Mat Babiak
- Publisher: NGO Euromaidan Press
- Staff writers: Ukrainian volunteers
- Founded: 2014
- Language: English, Spanish
- City: Kyiv
- Country: Ukraine
- OCLC number: 992513459
- Website: euromaidanpress.com
- Free online archives: Yes

Euromaidan Press (EP) is an English-language news website launched in 2014 by contributors from Ukraine, sponsored by reader contributions and the International Renaissance Foundation. It shares its name with the Euromaidan movement in Ukraine. Registered as a non-governmental organization, EP's stated goal is to provide English-language material to those interested in Ukrainian topics such as business issues, the economy, military conflict, and tourism.

== News organization ==
Euromaidan Press was founded in by Ukrainian volunteers as a newspaper based online in order to provide independent news reporting on issues relevant to Ukraine. The news organization first launched in January 2014. It shares its name and values with the Euromaidan movement from Ukraine, and the news organization states they, "support initiatives developing independent media and democratic initiatives in other states that uphold the core democratic values." The lead creator of the site was Canadian analyst Mat Babiak (who departed the following year), and was Kyiv-based activist Alya Shandra. Shandra had previously helped translate Ukrainian news reporting into English during the 2013 wave of demonstrations and civil unrest in Ukraine known as Euromaidan. Other journalists contributing to the newspaper have included Maksym Nedrya, Oleh Gychko, Mykhailo Honchar, and Paul A. Goble.

The goal of the newspaper's foundation was to provide information to English-language consumers on journalism from Ukraine. The organization registered in Ukraine as a non-governmental organization with the same name. The news organization developed its focus on stories related to the Russo-Ukrainian war, business issues, the Ukrainian economy, and tourism. The newspaper's founding was an attempt to "collect, rely on, and promote non-partisan, non-religious, non-biased information", as a way to address what the organization saw as a disinformation campaign by Russia in Ukraine.

News content was set up to be delivered online through the newspaper's website euromaidanpress.com. The newspaper maintained social media accounts on Twitter and Facebook at Euromaidanpr. A sub-project called the Friends of Ukraine Network released semi-regular news reporting about Ukraine political issues. The newspaper's Reft and Light Project was set up in order to analyze totalitarian groups. The news organization worked in conjunction with Euromaidan SOS to bring attention to political prisoners of Ukraine origin jailed in Russia, through the website letmypeoplego.org.ua. The International Renaissance Foundation supported the initiatives of Euromaidan Press.

== Reception ==
Writing in the Journal of Soviet and Post-Soviet Politics and Society, contributor Tatiana Bonch-Osmolovskaya characterized the news organization among, "a series of online initiatives aimed at raising global awareness of Ukrainian issues". She described Euromaidan Press as "an online newspaper specializing in translations of materials from local Ukrainian news outlets". J. L. Black and Michael Johns, in their book The Return of the Cold War: Ukraine, The West and Russia (2016), cited the news organization as a resource, commenting it had a "colourful website". Euromaidan Press has been relied upon for research on Ukrainian news analyses by The Perfect Storm of the European Crisis (2017), New Generation Political Activism in Ukraine: 2000–2014 (2017) by Christine Emeran, Online around the World: A Geographic Encyclopedia of the Internet, Social Media, and Mobile Apps (2017), and Gerard Toal's Near Abroad: Putin, the West and the Contest over Ukraine and the Caucasus (2017).

== See also ==
- Euromaidan
- Revolution of Dignity
- Annexation of Crimea by the Russian Federation
- International reactions to the war in Donbas
- Russo-Ukrainian War
