= Philip Oppenheimer =

British diamond dealer and racehorse owner (1911–1995)

Sir Philip Oppenheimer
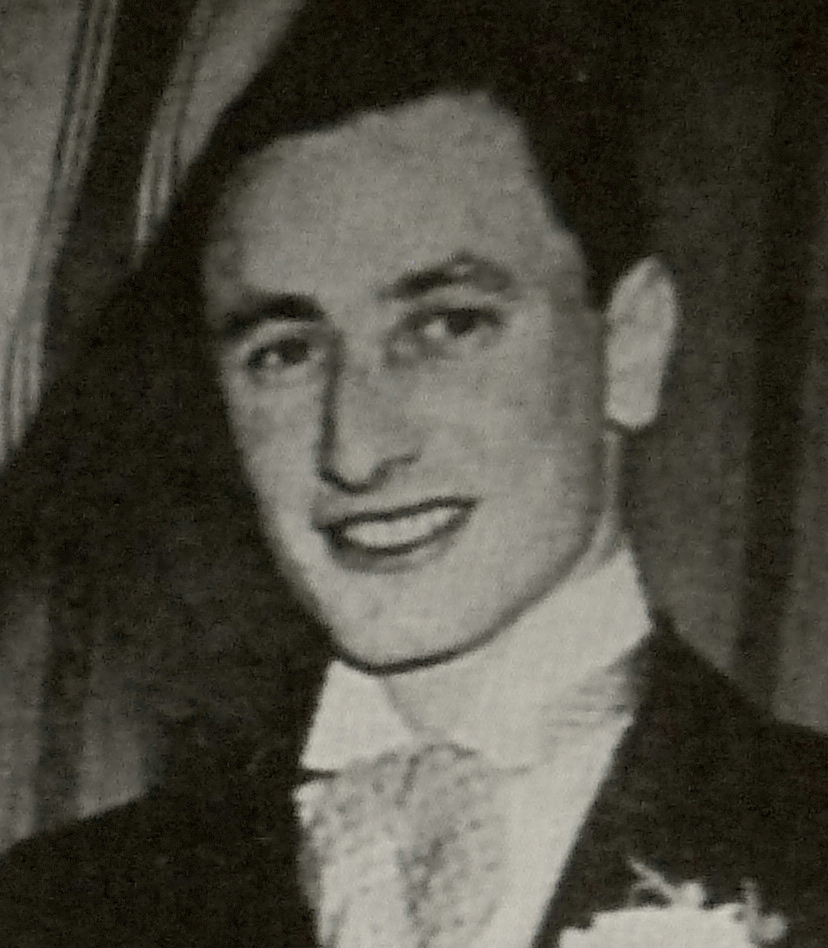
- Born: Philip Jack Oppenheimer; 29 October 1911; London, England
- Died: 8 October 1995 (aged 83); London, England
- Education: Jesus College, Cambridge
- Occupation: Diamond dealer
- Spouse: Pamela Fenn Stirling (m. 1936)
- Children: 2, including Anthony
- Parent: Otto Oppenheimer
- Relatives: Sir Ernest Oppenheimer (uncle)

Sir Philip Jack Oppenheimer (29 October 1911 – 8 October 1995) was a British diamond dealer and racehorse owner.

Philip Oppenheimer was born on 29 October 1911, the son of Otto Oppenheimer. He was educated at Harrow School and Jesus College, Cambridge, where he was captain of the boxing team.

In 1935 he married Pamela Fenn Stirling. They had one son, Anthony Oppenheimer, and one daughter.
