= Mary Slack =

South African philanthropist (born 1943)

- Born: Mary Oppenheimer; December 1943 (age 82)
- Citizenship: South Africa
- Education: Heathfield School, Ascot
- Spouse: Gordon Waddell (m. 1965; div. 1971)
- Children: 4, including Jessica Slack-Jell
- Father: Harry Oppenheimer
- Relatives: Nicky Oppenheimer (brother)

Mary Slack (née Oppenheimer; born December 1943) is a South African businesswoman and philanthropist. The daughter of Harry Oppenheimer, she is a former chairperson of the Oppenheimer Memorial Trust and the former managing director of the Market Theatre. She is also active in horse racing and breeding and owns the Wilgerbosdrift stud farm in Piketberg, Western Cape.

== Biography ==
Slack was educated at the Healthfield School, where she was head girl, and the Sorbonne University. She is one of two children of Anglo American magnate Harry Oppenheimer and his wife Bridget. Her father was of German-Jewish and Czech-Jewish descent. Though her younger brother Nicky has a more prominent role in managing the family's business interests, she has equal voting rights with him and reportedly influenced the family's decision to sell De Beers to Anglo American in 2011. Slack's own business interests have included an investment company called Wiphold, which she co-founded, and Amaridian, an art gallery in SoHo, New York.

Slack became a trustee of the Oppenheimer Memorial Trust, founded by her father, in 1971, and later served as its chairwoman. She was managing trustee of the Market Theatre in Johannesburg between 1989 and 1992. She founded Business and Arts South Africa in 1997 and served as its inaugural chairwoman. She has also served as chairwoman of her family's Brenthurst Library and Brenthurst Press, was a patron of the South African Mzansi Ballet, and was involved in fundraising for Dorkay House.

== Horse racing and breeding ==
Slack's parents were prominent in horse racing and breeding and Slack, a show-jumper in her youth, joined them in the early 1990s. In 1997, she opened her own stud farm at Wilgerbosdrift outside Piketberg. After Slack's mother died in 2013, the Oppenheimer stud farm, Mauritzfontein, passed to the management of Slack's daughter Jessica Slack-Jell, and the breeding operations of Wilgerbosdrift and Mauritzfontein were subsequently conjoined; collectively the farms own about 150 mares.

Slack also races horses in South Africa and, more recently, in Britain. Her colours, black with a scarlet cap, were registered by Jack Joel in 1900 and later gifted to her by Jim Joel. Her horse Sparkling Water won the 2022 Durban July, and her horse Claymore won the Hampton Court Stakes in the 2022 Royal Ascot. Later that year, she and businessman Zhang Yuesheng became the first non-resident members of the Hong Kong Jockey Club.

In May 2020, Slack's family office, Mary Oppenheimer Daughters, extended R100 million in post-commencement finance to Phumelela Gaming & Leisure, South Africa's largest horse-racing company, which had recently entered business rescue. Later that year it extended R550 million more as part of a restructuring plan. Slack does not have a position in the restructured company, 4Racing. Partly in recognition of her intervention to rescue Phumelela, she received a Lifetime Achievement Award at the Equus Awards in September 2020. 4Racing also renamed the SA Fillies Classic in her honor.

== Philanthropy and political activities ==
Slack donated R1 billion to the Solidarity Fund during the COVID-19 pandemic. Her other philanthropic initiatives have included sponsoring the recording of an Allen Kwela album and sponsoring the establishment of the African Leadership Academy. She is also a major donor to South African opposition political parties. Since the introduction of party finance disclosure requirements, which she opposed, Slack has been one of the primary donors to the Democratic Alliance (DA), and she was the party's second largest individual backer, after Michiel le Roux, ahead of the 2024 general election.

== Personal life ==
Slack lives at Brenthurst Estate, the Oppenheimer family compound in Parktown, Johannesburg. She has four daughters. Three – Victoria Freudenheim, Rebecca Diamond, and Jessica Slack-Jell – are also major political donors. Jessica is married to Steven Jell, a horse trainer who works with Mike de Kock.

Slack's first husband was Scottish rugby player Gordon Waddell, whom she met in 1962 and married in 1965. After their divorce in 1971, Waddell won custody of their daughters, Victoria and Rebecca, and remained involved in the Oppenheimer businesses.
