= Brenthurst Foundation =

Non-governmental organization in South Africa

The Brenthurst Foundation
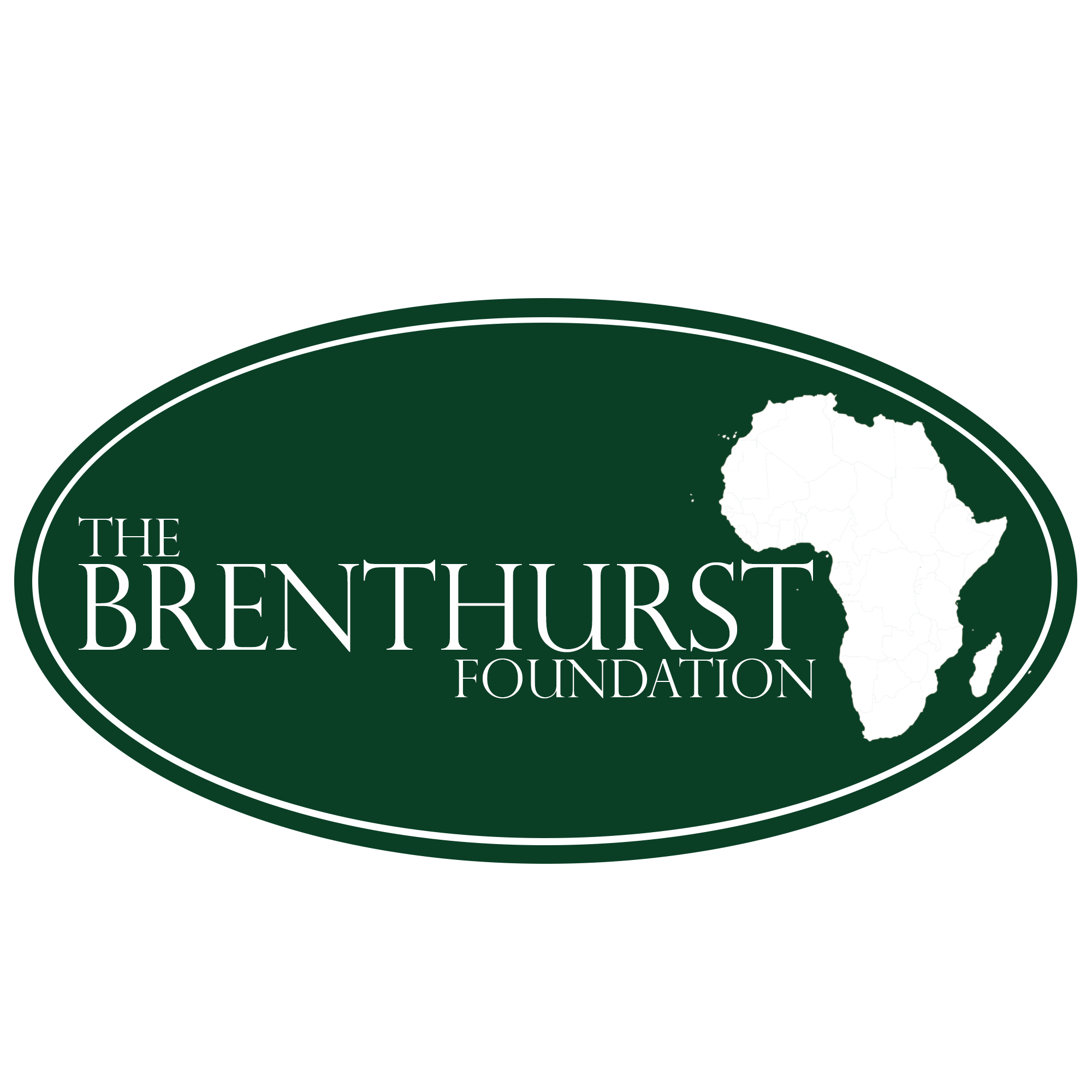
- Formation: 2004; 22 years ago
- Founders: Jonathan Oppenheimer
- Dissolved: July 16, 2025; 13 months ago
- Type: Foundation
- Purpose: African economic development
- Headquarters: Johannesburg, South Africa
- Region served: Africa, Asia, and Latin America
- Key people: Greg Mills (Director); Olusegun Obasanjo (Chair)
- Website: thebrenthurstfoundation.org

The Brenthurst Foundation was a Johannesburg-based think-tank established by the Oppenheimer family in 2004 to support the Brenthurst Initiative in seeking ways to fund African development and to organize conferences on African competitiveness.

The Foundation published op-ed articles and discussion papers on matters related to growth and security, and hosted election monitoring missions in Africa. It also conducted opinion surveys on key policy matters, and on election sentiment.

On 16 July 2025, the foundation's Research Director Ray Hartley announced the organization's closure. No reason was provided.

== History ==
The Foundation was created to build on the Oppenheimers' Brenthurst Initiative, designed to instigate a debate in South Africa around policy strategies to achieve higher rates of economic expansion. The Foundation went on to have a wider African focus, aiming to find ways to draw the investment needed for "continental regeneration and prosperity".

The organisation intended to make a worthwhile contribution to economic growth in Africa by creating an environment conducive to positive economic change in order to strengthen the importance of Africa in the global market. It worked to set up government policy platforms for economic development through organizing high-level governmental dialogues, supporting economic and political research on topical and important issues, and disseminating practical policy advice to relevant actors.

In 2002, the annual Tswalu Dialogue meeting series was established as an African forum to discuss issues of concern to continental development and security. Hosted by Jonathan Oppenheimer at the Tswalu Kalahari Game Reserve in South Africa's Kalahari Desert, the Dialogue involved active collaboration between a variety of international partners.

In June 2023, the European Solidarity Centre and the Brenthurst Foundation staged a conference on "Rolling Back Authoritarianism" in Gdańsk, Poland, the epicentre of political change in Poland and in Europe in the late 1980s. The event was attended by over 50 leaders from Africa, Latin America, Poland and the Baltic States. At the end of the event, the Gdańsk Declaration was adopted unanimously. It lays out the commitment of all delegates to ending authoritarianism and introducing democracy, accountability, and transparency.

== Impact ==
The organization has been active in a range of roles in various countries across the continent, including in Ghana, Zambia, Kenya, Zanzibar, Malawi, Lesotho, Somaliland, Sudan, Rwanda, Mozambique, Mali, Eswatini, Morocco, Zimbabwe, Namibia, and Ethiopia.

The Foundation also organized regular policy study-tours for its African partners to a number of countries. These aimed to expose African opinion-formers to development 'best practice'. These trips have included participation by officials up to the prime-ministerial level, and incorporated meetings with current and former heads of state. Countries visited in the past include: Vietnam (2007, 2009, 2011), Singapore (2008 and 2009), Cambodia (2011), Panama (2009), Colombia (2009 and 2014), Costa Rica (2009), El Salvador (2009) and Morocco (2008 and 2019) and Poland (2023).

== Literature ==
Books published by the Brenthurst Foundation include:

- In the Name of the People: How Populism is Rewiring the World (October 2022)
- Better Choices: Ensuring South Africa's Future (September 2022)
- The Ledger: Accounting for Failure in Afghanistan (December 2021)
- Expensive Poverty: Why Aid Fails and How it Can Work (October 2021)
- The Asian Aspiration: Why and How Africa Should Emulate Asia (March 2020)
- Vital Signs: Health Security in South Africa (January 2020)
- Democracy Works: Re-Wiring Politics to Africa's Advantage (January 2019)
- Making Africa Work: A Handbook for Economic Success (May 2017)
- A Great Perhaps? Colombia: Conflict and Convergence (November 2015)
- How South Africa Works - And Must do Better (March 2015)
- Why States Recover: Changing Walking Societies into Winning Nations, from Afghanistan to Zimbabwe (October 2014)
- Somalia - Fixing Africa's Most Failed State (March 2013)
- Africa's Third Liberation (November 2012)
- On the Fault Line: Managing Tensions and Divisions within Societies (March 2012)
- Why Africa is Poor: And What Africans Can Do About It (January 2012)
- Victory Among People: Lessons from Countering Insurgency and Stabilising Fragile States (February 2011)
- From Africa to Afghanistan: With Richards and NATO to Kabul (August 2007)
- Big African States: Angola, DRC, Ethiopia, Nigeria, South Africa, Sudan (November 2006)
