= International reactions to the war in Donbas =

Reaction to war in Ukraine

Many states and international organisations reacted to the war in Donbas, a phase of the Russo-Ukrainian War that took place from 2014 to 2022 in the Donbas historical region in eastern Ukraine.

== General reactions ==
=== Supranational bodies ===
- European Union: The EU began imposing sanctions on Russia in March 2014, following the annexation of Crimea, with the lists of sanctioned individuals and entities having been expanded multiple times concurrently with escalations in Donbas. President of the European Council Donald Tusk stated that Russia was "[compensating] for its shortcomings by destructive, aggressive and bullying tactics against its neighbors."
- NATO: NATO published a statement on the war in Donbas and the annexation of Crimea by the Russian Federation in August 2014. It attempted to debunk the Russian government's accusations against the Ukrainian government, and also other statements made by Russia to justify its presence in Ukraine. According to the statement, Russia attempted to "divert attention away from its actions" and "levelled a series of accusations against NATO which are based on misrepresentations of the facts". It also said that Russia "made baseless attacks on the legitimacy of the Ukrainian authorities and has used force to seize part of Ukraine's territory". In response to the unauthorised entry of the Russian "humanitarian convoy" on 22 August, NATO Secretary General Anders Fogh Rasmussen stated that this incident could "only deepen the crisis in the region, which Russia itself has created and has continued to fuel. The disregard of international humanitarian principles raises further questions about whether the true purpose of the aid convoy is to support civilians or to resupply armed separatists". NATO general Philip Breedlove said on 20 September that the ceasefire implemented as part of the Minsk Protocol was "a ceasefire in name only", and criticised Russia for allowing men and equipment to flow freely across its border into Donbas.
- OSCE: In July 2015, the OSCE Parliamentary Assembly condemned Russia's "unilateral and unjustified assault on Ukraine's sovereignty and territorial integrity."
- United Nations: A press release issued on behalf of Secretary-General Ban Ki-moon stressed the importance of "constructive and results-oriented dialogue between all concerned", and of adherence to the terms of the Geneva Statement on Ukraine. The statement also made clear that the situation "remains extremely volatile".

=== UN member and observer states ===
- Australia: In March 2014, Australia's foreign affairs minister Julie Bishop said that "International law does not allow one state to steal the territory of another on the basis of a referendum that cannot be considered free or fair", after disputing the legitimacy of the Crimean referendum which voted to secede from Ukraine. The opposition's foreign affairs spokeswoman, Tanya Plibersek also said "Australia has a special responsibility as a member of the security council to join the international community in taking strong action to make clear our condemnation of the moves by Russia to annex Crimea and of the fatal attack on the Ukrainian serviceman in Crimea" firmly reiterating Australia's condemnation of Russian intervention across both parties in Parliament.
- Belarus: Belarusian president Alexander Lukashenko encouraged peace talks from the start of the Russo-Ukrainian war, and hosted the summits that produced the Minsk Protocol in September 2014 and Minsk II in February 2015.
- Canada: In November 2014, Canadian foreign minister John Baird stated that he thought that Russian president Vladimir Putin was waging "a murderous campaign in Ukraine", and that if this continued, President Putin would "go down in history as the man who destroyed all that was once positive in Russia-Ukraine ties – historical, religious, cultural, even fraternal bonds sacrificed to his ruthless expansionism in Crimea, Donetsk and Luhansk". In June 2015, Prime Minister Stephen Harper called for Putin "to end his invasion of Eastern Ukraine, to withdraw his soldiers, tanks and heavy weapons, and to cease providing military aid to insurgents."
- China: Premier Li Keqiang said in March 2015 that China "respects Ukraine's independence, sovereignty and territorial integrity" and expressed hope for a peaceful resolution of the conflict. At the same time Russian business and financial institutions observed "ambiguous position regarding Russian banks in the wake of US and EU sanctions" from the Chinese financial institutions, meaning in practice reduced willingness of Chinese banks to finance trade and execute interbank transactions with their counterparts in Russia.
- Czech Republic: Czech president Miloš Zeman said on 5 September that the situation in Donbas could "develop into a Russian invasion, but at this stage, it is a civil war between two groups of Ukrainian inhabitants". His words were at odds with statements by Prime Minister Bohuslav Sobotka and Defence Minister Martin Stropnický, who both said there were at least 5,000 Russian troops in Ukraine. Prime Minister Sobotka also said: "I suppose that Europe should not harm itself by these sanctions. I consider the escalation of sanctions a very risky business."
- Estonia: In March 2014, Estonia's president Toomas Hendrik Ilves said: "Justification of a military invasion by a fabricated need to protect ethnic "compatriots" resuscitates the arguments used to annex Sudetenland in 1938."
- France: France was criticised at the time of the annexation of Crimea for continuing to prepare two Mistral class amphibious assault ships for delivery to Russia. The first one was meant to be delivered in October 2014. France eventually decided to place the delivery on hold in September, following increasing escalation in the Donbas, and reported Russian intervention there.
- (Georgia (country)) Georgia: In April 2014, Georgian president Giorgi Margvelashvili said in an interview, "I don't think it's a right choice to alienate Russia, to cut relations with Russia. Because alienating Russia makes Russia even more aggressive, unpredictable and dangerous". He said that Russia should be made to understand "that relations between neighbours or countries around the world aren't built through military interventions". In March 2015, he followed up his earlier remarks, saying, "the occupation of Georgian territories in 2008, war in Ukraine in 2014 and support of separatists in Transnistria is nothing but...Georgia's, Ukraine's and Moldova's punishment by Moscow for their European choice".
- Germany: According to the German Foreign Office, Merkel said that the war was never a conflict "within Ukraine", but a confrontation between Russia and Ukraine. In November 2014, Merkel stated that "old thinking about spheres of influence, which runs roughshod over international law" put the "entire European peace order into question" and said that if Ukraine had chosen the Eurasian Economic Union, the West would not have responded by making 'noise' on the Ukrainian-Polish border.
- Kazakhstan: During a 22 December visit to Kyiv, Kazakh president Nursultan Nazarbayev stated "I am asking Russia and Ukraine to think about a compromise in order to end this conflict and preserve the territorial integrity of Ukraine, because this situation is nonsense and it should not have happened". He also called the international economic sanctions against Russia "a road to an impasse and a path to nowhere".
- Lithuania: In September 2014, Lithuanian president Dalia Grybauskaitė said "I think that Russia is terrorising its neighbours and using terrorist methods", and that "It is a shame on all the Western leaders to allow an aggressor to do what he wants with a sovereign country in the 21st century". In November 2014, she stated that "We know that today Ukraine is fighting for peace in Europe, for all of us. If a terrorist state that is engaged in open aggression against its neighbor is not stopped, then that aggression might spread further into Europe".
- Poland: In April 2015, Polish president Bronisław Komorowski said, "Today, when the sons of Ukraine are dying in the east of their country in the defence of national independence, they are also defending Europe. They are defending it against the return of imperial thinking, against policies that pose a threat to the freedom of all Europeans".
- Romania: Romanian president Klaus Iohannis condemned attacks on the city of Mariupol, stating that the responsibility for these attacks did not fall only on the separatists, but also on the Russian Federation. He added that Romania condemned the violation of Ukraine's territorial sovereignty, and supported further sanctions against Russia.
- Russia: The Russian Foreign Ministry accused Ukrainian authorities of "blaming" the Russian government for all its troubles and stated "Ukrainian people want to get a clear answer from Kyiv to all their questions. It's time to listen to these legal claims". It also stated it was "carefully observing" events in the east and south of Ukraine, and again called for "real constitutional reform" that would turn Ukraine into a federation. In a 7 April opinion piece in The Guardian, Russian foreign minister Sergei Lavrov wrote that it was Europe and the United States, and not Russia, that was guilty of destabilising Ukraine and that "Russia is doing all it can to promote early stabilisation in Ukraine". The Russian Foreign Ministry issued a stern condemnation of the "criminal order" by Kyiv for armed aggression against Donetsk: "The Kiev authorities, who self-proclaimed themselves as a result of a coup, have embarked on the violent military suppression of the protests," demanding that "the Maidan henchmen, who overthrew the legitimate president, to immediately stop the war against their own people, to fulfill all the obligations under the Agreement of 21 February." Russian president Vladimir Putin compared the siege of the DPR and LPR-controlled cities of Donetsk and Luhansk to the Siege of Leningrad during the Second World War: "Sadly, it reminds me of World War II, when German fascist forces surrounded our cities, like Leningrad, and shelled population centres and their residents". On 4 September 2015 the Investigative Committee of Russia published an insulting letter to the Ministry of Foreign Affairs of Ukraine with threats of holding "Nuremberg-2 trials" against the government of Ukraine in addition to calling the Ukrainian language "retarded".
- Sweden: In September 2014, then Swedish foreign minister Carl Bildt said that "[Russian president Vladimir] Putin's actions threaten the entire basis of the post-Cold War order in Europe" and that "Ukraine is an independent nation. It has the right to choose its own destiny. If it wants to belong to the EU, that is up to Ukrainians. Russia has no right to dismember or destabilise independent countries if it doesn't agree with their choices".
- Turkey: In May 2015, Turkish foreign minister Mevlut Cavusoglu said that "Nothing can justify what Russia has been doing in its neighbourhood. Ukraine. Crimea. Georgia."
- United Kingdom: In a statement at a meeting of the UN Security Council on 6 August, UK Permanent Representative to the United Nations Sir Mark Lyall Grant said: "The truth of the matter is that this is not an insurrection born in the Donbas; it is an insurgency manufactured in Moscow. It is led by Russians, using Russian-supplied weapons, in a deliberate effort to destabilise Ukraine and to exert control over Kiev". Sir Mark made another statement to the Security Council on 28 August, and listed "100 main battle tanks, 80 armoured personnel carriers, 100 man-portable air-defence systems, 100 anti-tank weapons and over 100 artillery pieces" that were supplied to the Donbas insurgents directly by Russia. Defence Secretary Michael Fallon announced on 7 March 2015 that Britain would send an additional £850,000 in non-lethal aid following Ukraine's request. On 19 January 2016, Michael Fallon said that Ukraine will receive 3,500 first-aid kits equal to £500,000 in April before the British training of Ukrainian troops. The Queen pledged that her government will continue to work to resolve the conflict in Ukraine.
- United States: US Secretary of State John Kerry said on 7 April 2014 that the events "did not appear to be spontaneous" and called on Russia to "publicly disavow the activities of separatists, saboteurs and provocateurs" in a phone call to his Russian counterpart Sergei Lavrov. A spokeswoman for the US National Security Council noted that the separatists appeared to be supported by Russia. "We saw similar so-called protest activities in Crimea before Russia's purported annexation," she said in a statement, adding: "We call on President (Vladimir) Putin and his government to cease all efforts to destabilize Ukraine, and we caution against further military intervention." American ambassador to Ukraine Geoffrey R. Pyatt characterised the pro-Russian insurgents as "terrorists". The US government is sending military advisors to Ukraine to aid the Ukrainian government in its fight against the insurgents. In April, the US Defence Department shipped a 7 million US dollar package of non-lethal military equipment to the Ukrainian forces. Plans for another 8 million dollar million aid package were announced on 1 August 2014. The package was meant to include armoured personnel carriers, goods and patrol vehicles, binoculars, night vision goggles and small patrol boats. On the same day, the Defence Department also proposed a 19 million dollar aid package to help train the National Guard of Ukraine. This proposal required congressional approval, and would come into effect in 2015. It had been announced in July that a group of Defence Department specialists in strategy and policy would visit Kyiv to evaluate the military needs of the Ukrainian government. On 8 September 2014, The New York Times reported that only a portion of the initial non-lethal aid package had actually arrived in Ukraine. While this report cited concerns about provoking escalation in the region as the reason for the delay, a 13 September 2014 report by The Globe and Mail cited various sources that indicated that both the American package and a $200 million Canadian military aid package were delayed by concerns about diversion of saleable equipment due to corruption among Ukrainian officials. On 11 March 2015, the American government said it would send an additional 75 million US dollars' worth of non-lethal aid to Ukraine. This included radios, first-aid kits, surveillance drones, counter-mortar radar systems, military ambulances, 30 armoured Humvees and 300 unarmoured Humvees. In March 2016, US Assistant Secretary of State Victoria Nuland stated that a total of 266 million dollars was spent on non-lethal aid to Ukraine. She also said that nearly 1,200 Ukrainian soldiers and 750 National Guard members had been trained by American military personnel.
- Nordic countries: A joint declaration on the Russo-Ukrainian war by the defence ministers of Denmark, Finland, Norway, Sweden and the foreign minister of Iceland was released in Norwegian newspaper Aftenposten on 9 April 2015. The declaration stated that Russian aggression against Ukraine and the annexation of Crimea are violations of International law and other international treaties, and that the Nordic countries will evaluate Russia on the basis of its actions, rather than on rhetoric promoted by the Russian government. After pointing out that Russia had increased military exercises and intelligence gathering activity in the Baltic and the North Sea, violating Nordic borders and jeopardising civilian air traffic, the declaration stated that the Nordic countries intended to face these threats with solidarity and increased cooperation. The document said that this collaboration would be extended to include solidarity with the Baltic countries, work with the EU, and to collaboration with NATO, to maintain the transatlantic link.

=== Non-governmental political parties ===
In contrast to the unanimous condemnation by western governmental spokespeople of the Russian role in the conflict, European politicians representing euroscepticism, mainly on the right of the political spectrum, criticised the role of western governments in allegedly precipitating the crisis, in some cases supporting Russian president Vladimir Putin's position. Agence France-Presse reported that "From the far right to the radical left, populist parties across Europe are being courted by Russia's Vladimir Putin who aims to turn them into allies in his anti-EU campaign" and that "A majority of European populist parties have sided with Russia over Ukraine." Some of the parties have received Russian support and financing. After the May 2014 European parliament election, eurosceptic representation increased in that body from 92 seats to 150 (out of 751). Such opinions were expressed in Britain by Nigel Farage, leader of the UK Independence Party, in France by Marine Le Pen, leader of France's far-right National Front, in Austria by Heinz-Christian Strache, the chairman of the Freedom Party of Austria, in the Netherlands by Geert Wilders, founding leader of the Party for Freedom, and in Italy, Hungary, Slovakia, and Bulgaria. The shoot-down of Malaysia Airlines Flight 17 over the Donbas conflict zone in mid-July moderated these opinions.

Reviewing votes in the EU Parliament on resolutions critical of Russia or measures not in the Kremlin's interests (e.g., the EU-Ukraine Association Agreement), Hungary's Political Capital Institute found that future members of Europe of Nations and Freedom voted "no" in 93% of cases, European United Left–Nordic Green Left in 78% of cases, and Europe of Freedom and Direct Democracy in 67% of cases. The writers stated that "It would therefore be logical to conclude, as others have done before, that there is a pro-Putin coalition in the European Parliament consisting of anti-EU and radical parties."

=== Others ===
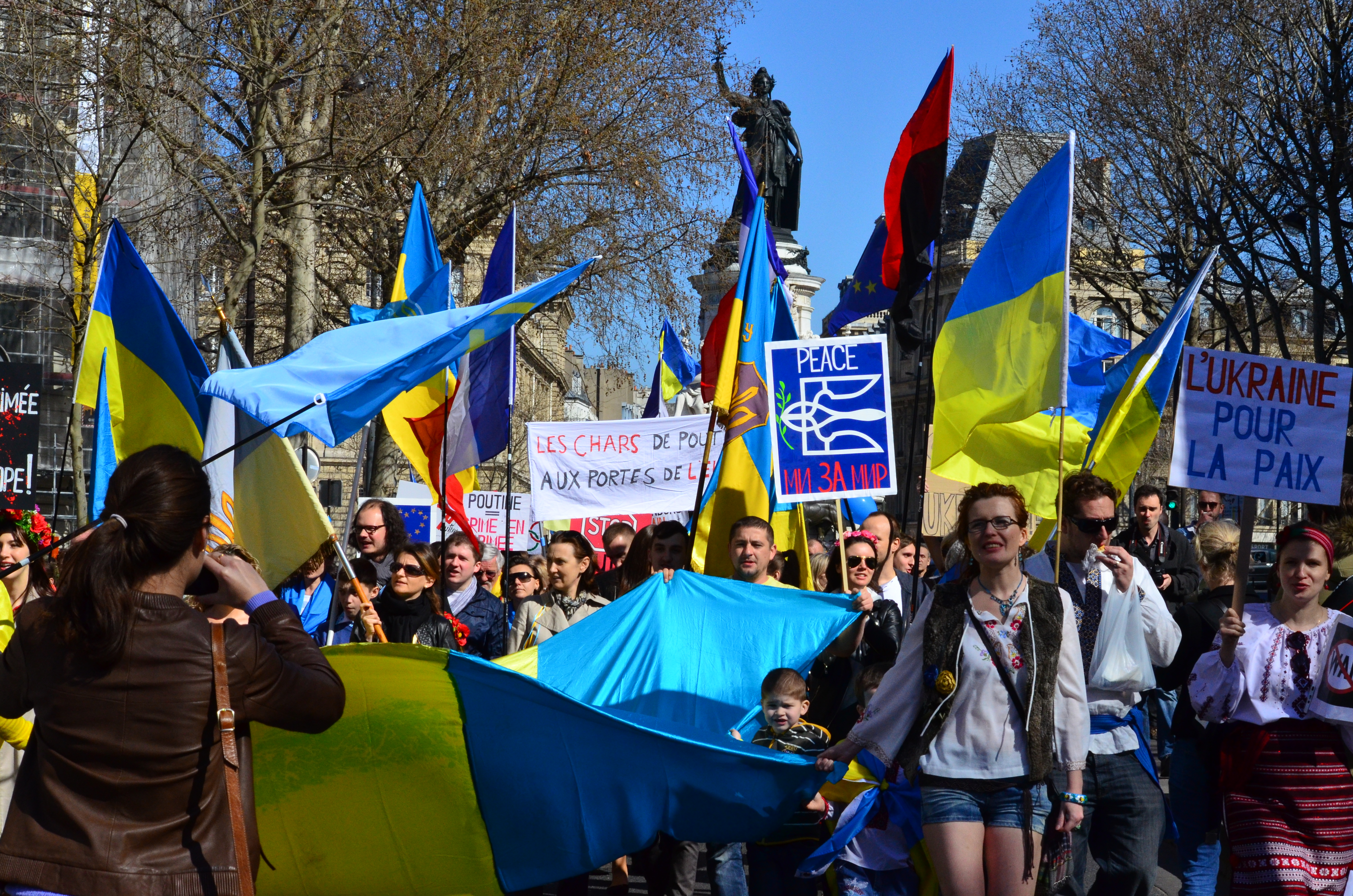
Demonstration for peace in Donbas, Paris

Russian opposition leader Boris Nemtsov said that Russian president Vladimir Putin sought to "punish" Ukraine to prevent an anti-corruption revolution like Euromaidan from taking place in Russia. Former Georgian president Mikheil Saakashvili said that Ukraine "is [Putin's] West Berlin – the taking of which was a matter of principle for Stalin and the successful protection of which ultimately reversed the spread of communism in Europe. The dismantlement of Ukraine is how Putin seeks to erode the values of the transatlantic alliance, and the future of Europe is no less at risk than it was decades ago in Germany". Garry Kasparov considered the West's response to be weak, saying politicians were "lining up to become a new Chamberlain." In February 2015, former Lithuanian president Andrius Kubilius said that he thought that "What we see in Ukraine is not a "Ukrainian crisis", nor is it a "conflict in Ukraine". This is Putin's war, which was initiated by him, which has been supported by him, which is being implemented by him, and which can only be stopped by him. [...] Mr. Putin, along with the mainstream political class in Russia, is still living with a lot of nostalgia for the imperial past". The Major Archbishop of the Ukrainian Greek Catholic Church, Sviatoslav Shevchuk, stated that the signatories of the Budapest Memorandum were failing to honour their security assurances to Ukraine, which "has been attacked and needs such guarantees more than ever".

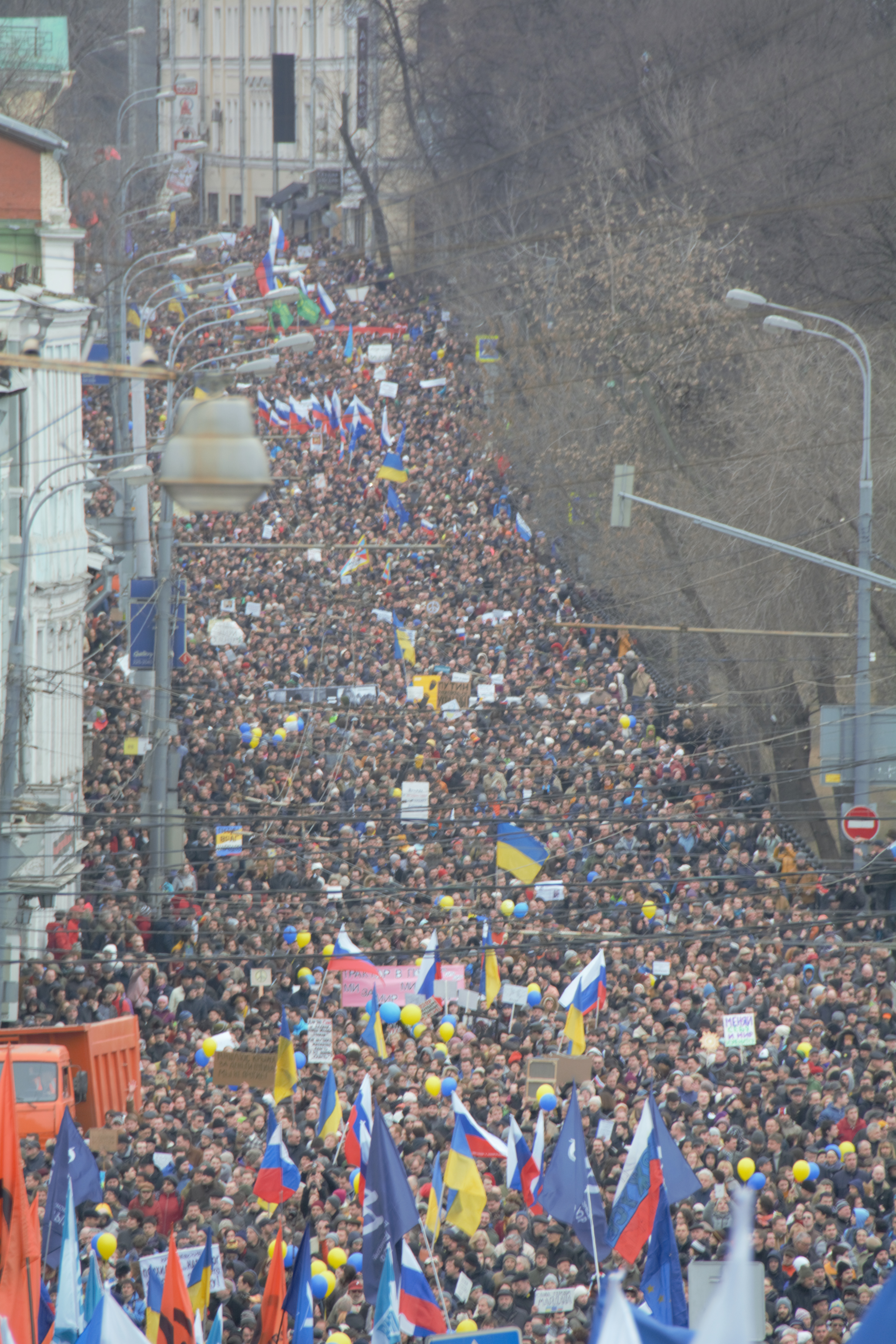
March for the peace and freedom in Moscow was one of the anti-war protests in Russia

In April 2014, historian Timothy D. Snyder wrote that Russia's foreign policy was "based openly upon the ethnicization of the world. It does not matter who an individual is according to law or his own preferences: that fact that he speaks Russian makes him a Volksgenosse requiring Russian protection, which is to say invasion." Although majorities in all regions voted to be part of an independent Ukraine during the 1991 referendum, former Czech president Václav Klaus, said that Ukraine was an artificially created state, and that Ukraine was in a state of civil war. In an article that appeared in Foreign Affairs, John J. Mearsheimer, an American neorealist international relations theorist at the University of Chicago, assigned most of the responsibility for the crisis to the United States and the European Union. He offered an invitation to "imagine the American outrage if China built an impressive military alliance and tried to include Canada and Mexico", and recommended that "the United States and its allies should abandon their plan to westernise Ukraine and instead aim to make it a neutral buffer". His article was criticised by Anders Åslund of the Peterson Institute, who said that Mearsheimer showed "contempt for democracy, national sovereignty, and international law", and that his thesis gave "Russia has the right to decide the fate of the countries in its neighbourhood in its own interest". Writing in World Affairs, Mariana Budjeryn also dismissed Mearsheimer's argument, saying "That the Russians failed to design a model of development and a security arrangement that would be equally attractive and did not require arm-twisting to keep together is not the west's fault. Turns out, democracy and rule of law is not the west's property to peddle around the world, but a political model post-Communist societies chose to pursue when they were free to do so".

In April 2014, a survey by infratest dimap found that 49% of Germans preferred a "middle position" for Germany between the west and Russia. This was reflected in the policy of moderation and mediation that Chancellor Angela Merkel espoused over the course of the Russo-Ukrainian War. After the war escalated, German public opinion turned against Russia, with 79% saying they had an unfavourable view of Russia and 82% saying Russia could not be trusted in an August 2014 poll. Ukrainian-American historian Alexander J. Motyl criticised the Social Democratic Party of Germany for its approach to Russian aggression in Ukraine, saying that they "appear increasingly committed to doing everything possible to appease Russian imperialism".

Gallup's 2014 world survey found that disapproval of the Russian leadership was highest in Norway (89%), the Netherlands (86%), Finland (86%), Switzerland (83%), Sweden (82%), Germany (81%), Ukraine (81%), Belgium (80%), Italy (78%), and Canada (77%). According to a Pew survey conducted from March to May 2015, negative views of Vladimir Putin were held by three-quarters of western Europeans, North Americans, and Australians (81%), and a majority in the Middle East, with the most negative responses found in Spain (92%), Poland (87%), France (85%) and Ukraine (84%). Outside of Russia (88%), the most favorable views of Putin were found in Vietnam (70%) and China (54%).

Some minor organisations have been formed to support the pro-Russian militants in the Donbas region, among them the Donbas Association in Sweden.

== Reactions to the August 2014 intervention by Russia ==
=== Supranational bodies ===
- European Union: EU leaders warned that Russia faced harsher economic sanctions than the EU had previously imposed if it failed to withdraw troops from Ukraine. They later condemned the Russian actions at a summit in Brussels, and announced a new round of sanctions.
- NATO: The Russian government's decision to send what it called a "humanitarian convoy" into Luhansk on 22 August without Ukrainian consent was condemned by NATO and several NATO member states, including the United States. NATO Secretary General Anders Fogh Rasmussen called it "a blatant breach of Russia's international commitments", and "a further violation of Ukraine's sovereignty by Russia". Late in August, NATO generals met and revised their assessment of the military situation in Donbas. They said that, from the Ukrainian government's point of view, the war is already lost. It was anticipated that the late-August offensive in southern Donetsk Oblast could be used to create a Russian land corridor to Crimea, consolidating the illegal annexation of the peninsula.

=== UN member and observer states ===
- Australia: Australian prime minister Tony Abbott condemned Russia's actions, labelling them "an invasion" and "utterly reprehensible."
- Estonia: Estonian president Toomas Hendrik Ilves called the situation an "undeclared war," and stated that Russia's actions violated the UN Charter, the Helsinki Final Act and the Charter of Paris.
- Germany: At an EU summit in late August 2014, Chancellor Angela Merkel warned that Russian president Vladimir Putin was moving toward a military escalation that could threaten Latvia and Estonia. Her stance was reported to reflect conclusions drawn from extensive conversations with Putin over the preceding nine months, together with evidence of bad faith on the part of Putin.
- Latvia: Latvian foreign minister Edgars Rinkēvičs said that Russia's actions in August were an "act of aggression" and that the conflict was a "war".
- Lithuania: Lithuanian president Dalia Grybauskaitė said Russia's actions meant it was at war with Ukraine, and "practically" at war with Europe. She called on the European Union to assist Ukraine in defending itself, saying "Today Ukraine is fighting a war on behalf of all Europe."
- Poland: Polish foreign minister Radosław Sikorski called the invasion "the greatest security crisis in Europe in decades." Poland also treats Russia's actions towards Ukraine as "fulfilling the attributes of 'aggression,' as defined in UN documents – Resolution 3314 of the United Nations General Assembly."("the most serious and dangerous form of the illegal use of force").
- Ukraine: Chairman of the Verkhovna Rada (Ukrainian parliament) Oleksandr Turchynov said that conflict was "a hybrid war that Russia has begun against Ukraine, a war with the participation of the Russian security services and the army."
- United States: US Ambassador to the United Nations Samantha Power commented on the invasion by noting that "At every step, Russia has become before this council to say everything but the truth. It has manipulated, obfuscated and outright lied. Russia has to stop lying and has to stop fuelling this conflict." In response to the August events, the American government also said that it supported stronger sanctions against Russia.

=== Non-governmental organisations ===
- Amnesty International: This organisation said that it considered the war to be "an international armed conflict", and presented independent satellite photos and analysis that it said proved the involvement of regular Russian soldiers in the conflict. It said that both Ukrainian and separatist forces were responsible for war crimes, and called on all parties, including Russia, to stop violations of the law of war.

== Barroso–Putin phone call ==
At the 30–31 August 2014 EU summit, European Commission President José Manuel Barroso told other EU leaders that, when he phoned Putin about the war in Donbas on 29 August 2014, during which Barroso said that he held Putin accountable for the military actions of separatists in eastern Ukraine, Putin allegedly replied: "The issue is not this. If I want, I can take Kyiv in two weeks." In a 2 September statement to TASS, Kremlin spokesperson Yuri Ushakov did not deny Putin had made this remark, but said that "[i]t was taken out of context and had a totally different meaning." The next day, Putin threatened to release the full recording and transcript of his phone call with Barroso, with ambassador Vladimir Chizhov adding that making details of a private conversation public was a breach of diplomatic protocol. On 5 September, TASS stated that "EC admits Barroso's words on phone talks with Putin were made public out of context", and that the Kremlin now considered the issue "closed" and no transcript would be published.

However, according to a 18 September Süddeutsche Zeitung article, when Barroso visited Kyiv on 12 September 2014, Ukrainian president Petro Poroshenko told Barroso that Putin had now also expressed similar threats to him (Poroshenko) on the phone, allegedly saying: "If I wanted to, Russian troops could not only be in Kyiv in two days, but also in Riga, Vilnius, Tallinn, Warsaw or Bucharest."

== See also ==
- International recognition of Donetsk and Luhansk
- Reactions to the Russian invasion of Ukraine
