= Brenthurst Initiative =

The Brenthurst Initiative was a 2003 policy paper on Black Economic Empowerment in South Africa by Jonathan and Nicky Oppenheimer that called for tax incentives to encourage economic growth and black wealth creation.

== The proposal ==
The initial, draft proposal release in August 2003 had the stated objectives of boosting South Africa's economic growth rate from 2.7 percent to 5 percent annually, developing a system of tax incentives and penalties to encourage black ownership of companies and businesses and to raise R224-billion to ensure 26 percent black ownership of all equity on the JSE Securities Exchange by 2014.

The tax incentives, on a sliding scale, would be calculated based on a company's rating on a governmental empowerment scorecard and was intended to provide a competitive advantage to racially transformed companies. This was interpreted as a "carrot" to balance the "stick" of legislated transformation requirements and associated penalties.

== Reception ==
The initiative was first released at a function opened by President Thabo Mbeki and drew praise from Cyril Ramaphosa and Moss Ngoasheng and criticism from Tony Leon and Mangosuthu Buthelezi.

The initial response from some economist and trade unions was described as "downright cool".

The initiative was subsequently criticised for being too limited, for potentially reducing the tax base and for effectively proposing that a black majority government fund the transformation of white-owned businesses.

The Helen Suzman Foundation called the initiative "both good news and bad news".

A 2004 proposal by the South African Revenue Service for tax breaks to companies that give shares to a broad base of employees was considered to be linked to the Brenthurst Initiative.
