= Harry Oppenheimer =

South African businessman (1908–2000)

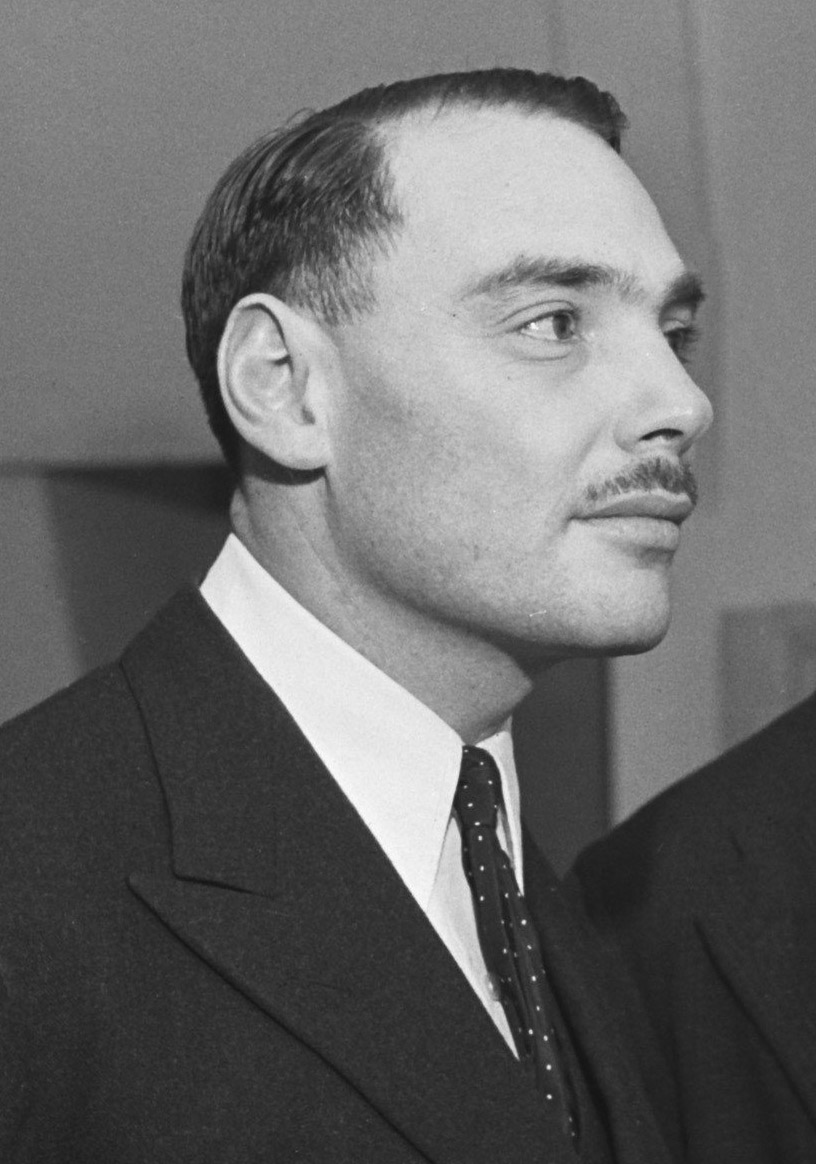
- Oppenheimer in Amsterdam, 1945
- Born: Harry Frederick Oppenheimer; 28 October 1908; Kimberley, South Africa
- Died: 19 August 2000 (aged 91); Johannesburg, South Africa
- Education: Oxford University
- Occupation: Businessman
- Spouse: Bridget McCall (m. 1943)
- Children: Mary Slack; Nicky Oppenheimer
- Parent(s): May Pollack; Ernest Oppenheimer

Harry Frederick Oppenheimer OMSG (28 October 1908 – 19 August 2000) was a prominent South African businessman, industrialist and philanthropist. Oppenheimer was often ranked as one of the wealthiest people in the world, and was considered South Africa's foremost industrialist for four decades. In 2004 he was voted 60th in the SABC3's Great South Africans.

== Early life and education ==
He was born in Kimberley, on 28 October 1908 to Jewish parents, May (née Pollak; 1886–1934), and Ernest Oppenheimer (1880 -1957). His paternal grandparents and maternal grandmother were German Jews, whereas his maternal grandfather was a Czech Jew from Mikulov. His parents married in London in a Jewish ceremony in the Reform tradition. His Brit Milah was performed by Rabbi Harris Isaacs of the Griqualand West Jewish Congregation. He spent his first seven years in Kimberley and attended the Kimberley Shul. Successive generations of his family believe that he had a Bar Mitzvah when he turned 13 in 1921.

After completing his primary schooling in Johannesburg, he attended Charterhouse School in England, before going on to study at Christ Church, Oxford, graduating in 1931 in Philosophy, Politics and Economics. In the same year he returned to Johannesburg, and settled in Brenthurst, the private estate built by his father, Ernest.

== Career ==
Harry Oppenheimer was the chairman of Anglo American Corporation for 25 years and chairman of De Beers Consolidated Mines for 27 years until he retired from those positions in 1982 and 1984 respectively.

In his 1983 The New York Times interview with Oppenheimer, Joseph Lelyveld wrote that Oppenheimer "more than anyone else has managed to preserve and strengthen the economic ties binding Johannesburg to Western financial centers."

He was also politically engaged, opposing racial discrimination and police-state methods during the apartheid era. He was a reformist in that he supported full trade union rights for black workers: "I do not believe that blacks will ever be brought to accept that the organisation of labor which is regarded as right and necessary for white workers, not only in South Africa but throughout the Western world, is not suitable for them." He served as Member of Parliament for Kimberley (1948 to 1957) with the United Party. He also became the opposition spokesman on economics, finance and constitutional affairs. In the 1970s and 1980s he subsequently financed the anti-apartheid Progressive Federal Party that later merged into the Democratic Alliance. In September 1985, he was one of 91 business leaders that signed a newspaper advertisement calling for an end to apartheid and negotiations with "acknowledged black leaders" on power sharing.

Oppenheimer also maintained cordial relations with African statesmen, such as Zambia's Kenneth Kaunda, dining at their official residences. He had more distant relations with the leadership of the ruling National Party in South Africa. In 1982 his house guest was Henry Kissinger and when the pair were invited by P.W. Botha to the Official residence, Libertas, it was the first time that he had dined there since 1948.

Through De Beers, he maintained extensive business interests on the continent, with diamond mines operating in Botswana, Namibia, Tanzania and Angola. Anglo American was also the premier company in neighbouring Zimbabwe. In a special agreement with the Soviet Union, De Beers sold Soviet diamonds through a London-based organisation. In the 1970s and 1980s, Oppenheimer capital was also used to found or purchase many businesses in Europe, the United States and Australia.

== Philanthropy ==
Oppenheimer visited Israel for the first time in 1968, meeting statesman David Ben Gurion. He made several other visits, visiting Yad Vashem and met with Prime Minister Menachem Begin. He became a generous benefactor of the country. He personally directed that Israel receive the necessary diamond raw products from De Beers to establish itself as one of the world's diamond polishing and exporting countries. He remained a supporter of Jewish causes during his entire life. He authorised the flow of diamonds to Israel's important diamond-sorting and diamond-cutting industry.

The Harry Oppenheimer Agricultural High School in Limburg, Limpopo is named in his honour in recognition of the funds he provided for its establishment.

The Harry Oppenheimer Fellowship Award, Africa's premier research prize, is awarded every year by the Oppenheimer Memorial Trust, in memory of Harry Oppenheimer's commitment to an ideal of "unambiguous excellence."

== Personal life ==
He married Bridget (née McCall) in 1943 and converted to Anglicanism.

He was a South African Freemason.

He died on 19 August 2001. His funeral was held at St. George's Church, an Anglican church where he had been a parishioner. A number of cabinet ministers and business leaders were also in attendance. Future president Cyril Ramaphosa said: "He did well in advancing the causes of many people."

=== Family ===
His son, Nicky Oppenheimer, became Deputy Chairman of Anglo American Corporation in 1983 and Chairman of De Beers in 1998. His daughter, Mary Slack, resides predominantly at Brenthurst, but has houses in Muizenberg and London, England, as well as Wilgerbosdrift stud farm in the Western Cape.

=== Residences ===
His main residence was the Brenhurst Estate in Parktown in Johannesburg.

Oppenheimer also required a Cape Town residence during his time as an MP, and in 1948 he purchased a cottage on Buitencingel street in the City Bowl.

In 1968, he built Milkwood, a seaside villa in uMhlanga, north of Durban. His wife, Bridget, was robbed at knifepoint at the home in 2008.

Oppenheimer later purchased an apartment in the Carlyle Hotel, an Art Deco luxury hotel on the Upper East Side of Manhattan.

== Awards and recognition ==
Kimberley conferred Freedom of the City on Oppenheimer on 4 September 1973 as a tribute to "an illustrious son of the city" who continued to promote Kimberley as "the diamond centre of the world."

Harry Oppenheimer Diamond Museum in Ramat Gan, Israel, was founded in 1986 to present his life and career.

Business positions
Preceded by Ernest Oppenheimer	Chairman of De Beers Consolidated Mines circa 1960–1983	Succeeded by Nicky Oppenheimer
Academic offices
Preceded by Albert van der Sandt Centlivres	Chancellor of the University of Cape Town; 1967–1999	Succeeded by Graça Machel
