= Otto Oppenheimer =

British diamond dealer (1882–1948)

- Born: 1882
- Died: 1948 (aged 65–66)
- Occupation: diamond dealer

Otto Oppenheimer (1882–1948) was a British diamond dealer, who ran the London end of the De Beers company for his brother Sir Ernest Oppenheimer.

He was the son of Eduard Oppenheimer, a cigar merchant, and his wife Nanette "Nanny" Hirschhorn.

His son was Sir Philip Oppenheimer.

== Bibliography ==
- The Rise and Fall of Diamonds by Edward Jay Epstein. (1982)
- Industrial Diamond review volume 40.(1980)
- The Diamond Invention by Edward Jay Epstein. (1982)
- Glitter and Greed by Janine Farrallel Robert
- West African Diamonds 1919-1983; An economic history by Peter Greenhalgh (1985)
