= Nicky Oppenheimer =

South African billionaire businessman (born 1945)

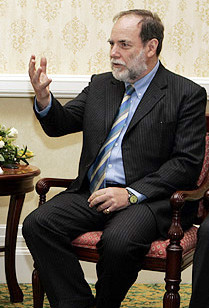
- Oppenheimer in 2006
- Born: 8 June 1945 (age 81); Johannesburg, South Africa
- Education: Harrow School; Christ Church, Oxford (MA)
- Occupation: Businessman
- Spouse: Orcillia Lasch (m. 1968)
- Children: Jonathan Oppenheimer
- Parents: Harry Oppenheimer (father); Bridget McCall (mother)
- Relatives: Mary Slack (sister)
- Website: https://opp-gen.com/

Nicholas "Nicky" Frank Oppenheimer (born 8 June 1945) is a South African billionaire businessman. He was formerly the chairman of De Beers diamond mining company and of its subsidiary, the Diamond Trading Company, and former deputy chairman of Anglo American. He is the third richest man in Africa with an estimated net worth of US$12.3 billion as of 2025 according to Bloomberg Billionaires Index.

== Early life ==
Born on 8 June 1945 in Johannesburg, Oppenheimer is the son of Bridget (née McCall) and Harry Oppenheimer, and grandson of Anglo American founder Ernest Oppenheimer (the first generation to chair De Beers, from 1929). His father was of German-Jewish and Czech-Jewish descent. He was educated at Ludgrove School, Harrow School and Christ Church, Oxford, where he read Philosophy, Politics and Economics, earning an Oxford MA.

== Business career ==
Oppenheimer joined Anglo American in 1968, was appointed a director in 1974, then became deputy chairman in 1983. He resigned in 2001, remaining a non-executive director until 2011.

He was appointed deputy chairman of the then Central Selling Organisation (now Diamond Trading Company) in 1984, and deputy chairman of De Beers Consolidated Mines in 1985. He was also appointed chairman of the Diamond Trading Company in 1985. Chairman of the De Beers Group from 1998 to 2012, he retired when the family stake was sold to Anglo American.

Oppenheimer appeared on the Sunday Times Rich List 2018 as the 23rd richest person in the United Kingdom, with a reported fortune of £5.5 billion. He was ranked as the richest person in South Africa on Forbes list of The World's Billionaires for 2019, with a fortune reported as US$7.3 billion and, again, on its 2020 list, with a reported fortune of US$7.6 billion in August 2020.

== Philanthropy ==
The Oppenheimer family has directed much of its philanthropic efforts towards preserving the heritage and cultural importance of the Southern African region, as well as to broader community upliftment in the areas of education, health, nature conservation and the arts. Nicky Oppenheimer and his son Jonathan Oppenheimer established the Brenthurst Foundation in 2005 as a way to contribute to the debate around strategies and policies for strengthening Africa's economic performance and enabling inclusive and sustainable development.

The family has also long been involved in environmental and conservation issues. The Oppenheimer family partnered with De Beers to establish the Diamond Route in 2006 to maximise the potential of their properties for conservation, research and environmental awareness purposes. The Diamond Route links 8 sites across northern South Africa, stretching from Namaqualand on the west coast, to Kimberley, north to Tswalu in the Kalahari, and to the Brenthurst Gardens in Johannesburg, eastwards to Ezemvelo Nature Reserve and northwards to the Venetia Limpopo Nature Reserve in Limpopo Province. Since 2015 Oppenheimer is also a Rhodes Trustee.

== Awards ==
In 2003, the Technikon Witwatersrand awarded Oppenheimer an honorary doctorate. He received the Presidential Order of Honour (2004) from the former President of Botswana, Festus Mogae, and an honorary fellowship (2009) from the London Business School.

== Personal life ==
In 1968, he married Orcillia "Strilli" Lasch, daughter of industrial tycoon Helli Lasch; both are Anglican. His father was born Jewish and converted to Anglicanism.

== Published works ==
- Over, Luke; Oppenheimer, Nicky; Tyrrell, Chris (illustrator) (2001). Waltham Place: and its Surrounding Parish. ISBN 0-9541669-0-6.

Preceded by Harry Frederick Oppenheimer	Chairman of De Beers Consolidated Mines circa 1983–2012	Succeeded by Cynthia Carroll
