= Carol Alexander =

British financial mathematician

- Born: Carol Olivia Alexander
- Citizenship: British
- Education: University of Sussex (BSc, PhD); London School of Economics (MSc)
- Known for: Financial risk management Derivatives; Crypto-asset markets
- Notable work: Market Risk Analysis (4 vols.)
- Scientific career
- Fields: Financial mathematics; finance
- Workplaces: University of Sussex; ICMA Centre
- Doctoral advisor: Walter Ledermann
- Website: coalexander.com

Carol Olivia Alexander is a British financial mathematician and academic. She is a professor of finance at the University of Sussex, known for her research on financial markets, derivatives, and risk management. She is the author of the four-volume textbook Market Risk Analysis (2008), which is widely cited in the field.

== Career ==
Alexander was a postdoctoral research fellow at the University of Amsterdam from 1981 to 1982. She became a lecturer in mathematics and economics at the University of Sussex in 1985. From 1999 to 2012 she held the Chair of Financial Risk Management at the ICMA Centre, part of the Henley Business School at the University of Reading. In 2012 she rejoined the University of Sussex as Professor of Finance and served as Head of Business and Management between 2013 and 2014.

She has also held visiting appointments, including a professorship at the Peking University HSBC Business School.

== Research ==
Alexander's research focuses on financial risk, derivatives, volatility modelling, and cryptocurrencies. Her recent publications have examined topics such as Bitcoin option pricing, hedging with crypto futures, and the performance of risk measures including Value-at-Risk and Expected Shortfall.

From 2013 to 2022, Alexander served as an editor of the Journal of Banking and Finance.

== Selected honours ==
- 2002 Honorary Professorship, Bucharest Academy of Economic Studies
- 2007 Professional Risk Managers' International Association Higher Standard Award
- 2024 European Female Quant of the Year by Rebellion Research

== Books ==
- Corruption and Fraud in Financial Markets: Malpractice, Misconduct and Manipulation, John Wiley & Sons, 2022, ISBN 978-1-119-42177-1
- Market Risk Analysis, Value at Risk Models, Wiley, 2009, ISBN 978-0-470-99788-8
- Market Risk Analysis, Pricing, Hedging and Trading Financial Instruments, Wiley, 2008, ISBN 978-0-470-77281-2
- Market Risk Analysis, Practical Financial Econometrics, Wiley, 2008, ISBN 978-0-470-77103-7
- Market Risk Analysis, Quantitative Methods in Finance, Wiley, 2008, ISBN 978-0-470-77102-0
- The Professional risk Managers' Handbook: A Comprehensive Guide to Current Theory and Best Practices PRMIA Publications, 2005, ISBN 978-0-976-60970-4
- Operational Risk: Regulation, Analysis and Managements, Pearson Education, 2003, ISBN 978-0-273-65966-2
- Mastering Risk: Volume 2 - Applications, Financial Times Management, 2001, ISBN 978-0-273-65436-0
- Market Models: A Guide to Financial Data Analysis, Wiley, 2001, ISBN 978-0-471-89975-4
- Visions of Risk, ISMA Centre, 2000, ISBN 978-0-877-78320-6
- Risk Management and Analysis, New Markets and Products, Wiley, 1999, ISBN 978-0-471-97959-3
- Risk Management and Analysis, Measuring and Modelling Financial Risk, Wiley, 1999, ISBN 978-0-471-97957-9
- The Handbook of Risk Management and Analysis, Wiley, 1996, ISBN 978-0-471-95309-8
