= Thomas Jeffery =

Thomas Jeffery may refer to:

- Thomas B. Jeffery (1845–1910), American inventor and manufacturer of bicycles and early automobiles
- Thomas Nickleson Jeffery (1782–1847), colonial official and politician in Nova Scotia
- Tom Jeffery (born 1953), British civil servant
- Thomas E. Jeffrey (born 1947), historian at Rutgers University
