= Roger W. Mills =

British economist

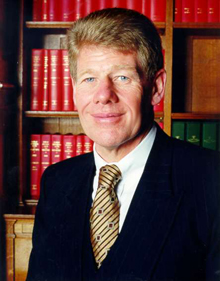
- Born: 13 February 1951 (age 75); Guildford, Surrey, UK
- Education: Henley Management College; Brunel University
- Awards: Emeritus professor, Henley Business School, University of Reading and Henley Management College; Master of College, Henley Management College
- Scientific career
- Fields: Corporate finance
- Workplaces: University College London; Henley Business School, University of Reading
- Website: www.drrogermills.com

Roger W. Mills (born 13 February 1951, in Guildford, Surrey, UK) is a British economist working in the area of corporate finance. Emeritus professor at Henley Business School University of Reading, the group chairman at Value Focus Group, a group of consulting firms, chief instructor and chairman of the British Shito Ryu Karate Association (BSKA), 8th Dan (Kyoshi).

== Biography ==
=== Academic career ===
Mills was born on 13 February 1951 in Guildford, Surrey, UK. Initially educated in psychology, sociology and economics, he migrated into accountancy and corporate finance after a 5-year period as an aircrew officer in the Royal Air Force (RAF). Prior to joining Henley Management College in 1983, Roger was a senior lecturer in accounting and finance at Thames Polytechnic.

In the Henley Management College he has held the following positions: director of studies, Brunel-based programmes from 1983 to 1987, director of studies for the Henley-based MBA programme from 1989 to 1995, director of Henley Brazil from 1996 to 1999, subject area leader – managing financial resources and business finance from 1983 to 2003, head of accounting and finance faculty from 1995 to 2005, and professor of finance and accounting from 1986 to 2007. He also established the Henley Centre for Value Improvement and played a significant role in the development of the DBA.

For a significant contribution to the life of the college he was awarded honorary degree – Master of college by Henley Management College in 2008.

From 2007 to 2012, Roger was the professor of business valuation and fundamental analysis, Vrije Universiteit Amsterdam.

From 2012 to 2013, he was a visiting professor of finance at University College London.

Roger has successfully supervised 23 PhD Students and has authored 13 books, 3 handbooks and numerous journal articles. His book 'The Dynamics of Shareholder Value' has been reprinted many times and was published in the Japanese and Polish languages.

==== Education ====
Doctor of Philosophy in finance, Henley Management College/Brunel University, 1986.

Master of Science, Henley Management College/Brunel University, 1982.

Certificate in Education, University of London, 1976.

Bachelor of Technology (Hons.), psychology, sociology, economics, Brunel University, 1974.

==== Professional qualifications ====
Fellow of the Chartered Institute of Management Accountants (FCMA)

Fellow of the Institute of Chartered Secretaries and Administrators (FCIS)

Fellow of the Association of Corporate Treasurers (FCT)

==== Academic Research ====
With Blacker, K., Weinstein, W. L., An investigation into the issues concerning people risk within the Newcastle Building Society, 2003.

With Peksyk, M., The Application of Strategic Value Analysis in the Polish Market, 2001.

Cost Accounting Practices for Batch Manufacturing – a major research project undertaken in conjunction with the Manufacturing Systems Department of Brunel – The University of West London, 1997.

With Santos, R., The Application of Strategic Value Analysis in the Brazilian Market, 1996.

With Yongqin, Cao, Accounting and financial reporting in China, 1996.

With Chen, Gordon, Evaluating International Joint Ventures Using Strategic Value Analysis, 1995.

Use of Shareholder Value Analysis in Evaluating Merger and Acquisitions by Large UK Companies – a project funded by Chartered Institute of Management Accountants, 1995.

Financial Aspects of Corporate Governance – An Internal and Management Audit Perspective – a project funded by the Institute of Chartered Accountants in England and Wales, 1995.

With Syamal K Gosh, The Application of Strategic Value Analysis in Privatisation Decisions, 1993.

Post completion auditing of capital projects – research initiated and sponsored by the Chartered Institute of Management Accountants, 1991.

Cost allocation within telecommunications – a major research project jointly funded by the Office of Telecommunications (Oftel) and Kingston Communications PLC, 1988.

Influences upon capital budgeting decisions exerted by senior central and divisional management in large UK companies, 1986.

The use of cost accounting information in pricing decisions within UK manufacturing and service companies, 1986.

==== Previously Supervised PhD Students ====
Peter J. Clark 'Time is Value – an investigation of the terminal value component in the prevailing 2 stage DCF valuation methodology'

Somkiat SSA 'Thai Commercial Banks and Compliance with Basel II Operational Risk Requirements'

Nadem Al Saleh 'The Capital Budgeting Practices of Major Bahraini Companies and their British Counterparts: A Benchmarking Approach/Capital Budgeting'

Keith Blacker 'An Investigation into Operational Risk Mitigation in UK Retail Banks'

James de Bono 'An Empirical Investigation of the Regression Approach and Pure-Play Approach Within the UK Corporate Environment'

Tom Corr 'A Study of the Fiscal Costs and Returns to the Province of Ontario and Government of Canada resulting from Tax Credits provided to investors in Ontario based Labour Sponsored Investment Funds'

David Ewers 'Director Remuneration and Performance: A Study of Top UK Companies 1996–1999'

Giampiero Favato 'Parametric Cost Analysis of Late-stage Pharmaceutical Development'

Peter Finnegan 'The Application of Shareholder Value Analysis as a Valuation Model in the UK Engineering Industry'

Edward Firman 'A Global Study on the Relationship Between Firms' Diversification into the Financial Services Industry and their Financial Performance'

Elaine Harris 'An Insight into Strategic Investment Appraisal: Project Risk Analysis'

Tom Kennedy 'The Impact of Activity-Based Costing Techniques on Firm Performance'

Haider Madani 'An Empirical Examination of the Explanatory Power of Accrual Earnings Versus Cash Flows: UK Industrial Sector'

Alfred Oldman 'The Development of a Model for Strategic Cost Reduction as a Managerial Response to Market Orientation'

Carole Print 'An Exploratory Longitudinal Study of the Implementation of Shareholder Value within Three Large International Companies'

John Robertson 'Predicting Corporate Failure: An Alternative Approach'

Jorg Weber 'Value-based Investment Allocation for Life Insurance Companies'

Jens Weng 'Shareholder Value Creation of M&A Strategies for Acquiring Firms in the Fast-Moving Consumer Goods Industry'

Henry Wild 'EVA and MVA — A Model to Predict Share Performance'

Sileanne Wootton 'The Investment Performance of Individual Investors'

Jurgen Dahlhoff 'Support for the Market Implied Competitive Advantage Period (MICAP) in the German Stock Market'

Lior Jassur 'The Behaviour of Asset Value and Asset Value Volatility when Quantifying Credit Risk'

Nitin Parekh 'An Investigation into the Ex Ante and Ex Post Equity Risk Premium in Developed and Emerging Markets'

==== Awards ====
Emeritus Professor, Henley Business School, University of Reading, 2008, 2008

Emeritus Professor, Henley Management College, 2008

Master of college, Henley Management College, 2008

=== Business career ===
As well as establishing a career in academia he has held a variety of senior positions in finance and industry: Executive managing director of Global Alliance Inc., Asia's First Investment Venture Bank, Professor of Shareholder Value to Price Waterhouse, and others.

Roger has consulted to numerous companies and organisations: Ernst & Young, Credit Suisse First Boston, Credit Agricole, Lloyds TSB, Den Norske Bank, HSBC, and many others.

He has worked in Asia, Africa, South America, Australasia, the Middle East and Central/Eastern Europe, focusing upon emerging markets.

He is currently the Group chairman at Value Focus Group.

=== Sport career ===
Roger is currently Chief Instructor and Chairman of the British Shito Ryu Karate (BSKA), 8th Dan (Kyoshi).

The British Shito-Ryu Karate Association (BSKA) was set up in 1974 by Roger W. Mills like a not-for-profit organisation that is managed by an executive committee. At the moment BSKA is the Shito Ryu arm of the United Seiki-Juku Karate Organization (UKSKO).

== Publications ==
=== Books/Chapters in Books ===
Clark, Peter and Mills, Roger W., 2013. Masterminding the Deal. Kogan Page.
Mills, Roger W., 2007. Financial Statement Analysis and Corporate Finance, Books 1 and 2, Value Focus Publishing.
Mills, Roger W., 2007. Corporate Finance – A Managerial Perspective, Value Focus Publishing.
Mills, Roger W. with Print, Carole F., 2006. Business Finance and Accounting, Value Focus Publishing.
Mills, Roger W. with Print, Carole F., 2006. Managerial Finance, Shareholder Value and Value Based Management. Value Focus Publishing.
Robertson, J. and Mills, Roger W., 2000. Accounting Principles for Non-Accounting Students. Mars Business Associates Ltd.
Mills, Roger W. with Print, Carole, F. and Rowbotham, Sean A., 1999. Managerial Finance, Shareholder Value and Value Based Management. Mars Business Associates Ltd.
Mills, Roger W., Robertson, John with Print, Carole, F. and Rowbotham, Sean A., 1999. Fundamentals of Managerial Accounting and Finance. Mars Business Associates Ltd.
Mills, Roger W., Shareholder Value Analysis – Its Use in Measuring Value Creation, FMAC 1999 Theme Booklet, IFAC, April 1999
Mills, Roger W., 1998. The Dynamics of Shareholder Value: The Principles and Practice of Strategic Value Analysis. Mars Business Associates Ltd.
Mills, Roger W., 1998. Understanding and Using Shareholder Value Analysis. In Ambrosini, V., with Johnson, G. and Scholes, K. (Eds.) Exploring Techniques of Analysis and Evaluation in Strategic Management, pp 229–244, Prentice Hall.
Mills, Roger W., 1997. Internal Control Practices within Large UK Companies. In Keasey, Kevin and Wright, Mike (eds.) Corporate Governance: Responsibilities, Risks and Remuneration, Wiley & Sons
Mills, Roger W., 1994. Strategic Value Analysis. Mars Business Associates Ltd.
Mills, Roger W. and Stiles, J., 1994. Finance for the general manager. Henley-McGraw Hill series.
Mills, Roger W. and Robertson, J.D.A., 1990. Fundamentals of Management Accounting and Finance. Mars Business Associates, (first published in 1990 — adopted by over 20 MBA courses as core reading material).

=== Handbooks, MBA Workbooks ===
Mills, Roger W., Strategic Planning, chapter in Financial Management Manual update series published by Accountancy Books.
Mills, Roger W., Cost Accounting, chapter in Practical Financial Management, update series published by GEE Publishing Ltd.
Mills, Roger W., Print, Carole F., Ewers, D., Editors, Handbook of Cost Management, published by GEE Publishing Ltd.
Mills, Roger W., Print Carole F., Ewers, D., Parker, D., HMC Workbooks, Managing Financial Resources Modules 1—4 (2000).
Mills, Roger W., Print Carole F., Ewers, D., with contributions from Marcin Peksyk and David Parker. Strategic Direction Workbook: Finance – Strategic Financial Analysis, Prepared by the Accounting and Finance Faculty (2001)

=== Selected articles ===
Mills, Roger W., Favato, G. and Weinstein, W. L., 2006. Using Scenario Thinking to Make it Relevant to Managers: A Case Study Illustration, Journal of General Management, Vol. 31, No. 3, Spring, pp. 49–74.
Weinstein, W.L., Blacker, K.B., Mills, Roger W., 2005. Can your Board Really cope with risk?” IFAC Articles of Merit, August, pp. 48–52.
Mills, Roger W., 2005. Assessing Growth Estimates in IPO Valuations —A Case Study, Journal of Applied Corporate Finance, Winter, Vol. 17, No. 1, pp 73–78.
Mills, Roger W., 1998 How do you value a start-up company? – The flotation of OrangeTM. Long Range Planning. Vol. 31 No. 1, June, pp 446–454.
Mills, Roger W. and Weinstein, Bill, 1996. Calculating Shareholder Value in a Turbulent Environment. Long Range Planning, Vol. 29 No. 1, pp 76–83.
Mills, Roger W. and Chen, Gordon., 1996. Evaluating International Joint Ventures Using Strategic Value Analysis. Long Range Planning, Vol.. 29 No. 4, pp 552–561.
Mills, Roger and Chen, Gordon., 1996. Evaluating Chinese Joint Venture Opportunities Using Strategic Value Analysis. Journal of General Management, Vol. 21 No. 4, Summer, pp 31–44.
Bear R., Mills, Roger W., Schmid Felix., 1994. Product costing in advanced technical environments. Management Accounting. Vol. 72, No. 11, December, pp 20–22.
With Dimech Debono J., Dimech Debono, V., 1994. Euro Disney: A Mickey Mouse Project? European Management Journal, Vol. 12 No. 3, September, pp 306–314.
With Syamal, K. Gosh., 1994. The Role of Strategic Value Analysis in European Privatisation Decisions. European Management Journal, Vol.12 No. 2, June.
Mills, Roger W., 1992. Cash: The Key Driver of Shareholder Value. The Treasurer, April, pp 7–12.
With Cave, M., Trotter, S., Lever, K., 1990. Cost Allocation and Regulatory Pricing in Telecommunications; A UK case study. Telecommunications Policy, December, pp 505–520.
Mills, Roger W. and Cave, Martin., 1990. Cost Allocation in Regulated Industries, Public Finance Foundation, CRI Regulatory Brief No. 3.
Mills, Roger W., Kennedy, Alison, J., 1990. The Post Completion Audit of Capital Expenditure Projects. Management Accounting Guideline. Chartered Institute of Management Accountants (CIMA), December.
Mills, Roger W., 1988. Measuring the Use of Capital Budgeting Techniques with the Postal Questionnaire; A UK Perspective. Interfaces, September—October, pp 81–87.
Mills, Roger W., 1988. Capital Budgeting — The State of the Art. Long Range Planning, Vol. 21 No.4, August, pp 76–81.
Mills, Roger W. and Robertson, J., 1988. Company Failure or Company Health?— Techniques for Measuring Company Health. Long Range Planning, Vol. 21 No. 2, April, pp70–77.
Mills, Roger W. and Sweeting, C., 1988. Pricing decisions in practice: how are they made in UK manufacturing and service companies?. The Chartered Institute of Management Accountants, Occasional Paper Series.
Mills, Roger W., 1988. Capital Budgeting Techniques used in the UK and the USA. Management Accounting, pp 26–27.
Mills, Roger W. and Herbert, P.J.A., 1987. Corporate and Divisional Influences in Capital Budgeting. The Chartered Institute of Management Accountants, Occasional Paper Series.
