= Bridges Hall =

Bridges Hall may refer to:

- Bridges Hall of Music, at Pomona College, Claremont, California, U.S.
- Ruby Bridges Hall (born 1954), an American civil rights activist
- Bridges Hall, a hall of residence at the University of Reading, England
- Bridges Hall, at Pace Academy, Atlanta, Georgia, U.S.
