= David Bell (university administrator) =

Public policy analyst and university administrator (born 1959)

Sir David Bell KCB DL

Vice-Chancellor of the University of Sunderland
- Incumbent
- Assumed office 24 September 2018
- Preceded by: Shirley Atkinson

Vice-Chancellor of the University of Reading
- In office 2012 – September 2018
- Preceded by: Tony Downes (acting)
- Succeeded by: Robert Van de Noort

Permanent Secretary of the Department for Education (Note: Known as the Department for Education and Skills from 2001 to 28 June 2007 and the Department for Children, Schools and Families from 28 June 2007 to 2010.)
- In office January 2006 – September 2012
- Preceded by: Sir David Normington
- Succeeded by: Tom Jeffery (acting)

Chief Inspector of Ofsted
- In office 1 May 2002 – 2006
- Preceded by: Mike Tomlinson
- Succeeded by: Maurice Smith (acting)

Personal details
- Born: 1959 (age 66–67)
- Education: University of Glasgow; Jordanhill College of Education (PGCE)

Sir David Robert Bell KCB DL (born March 1959) is a public policy analyst who is Vice-Chancellor and Chief Executive of the University of Sunderland. He was previously Vice-Chancellor of the University of Reading for six years. Prior to that, he was Permanent Secretary at the Department for Education and its predecessor departments from January 2006 until 2012. Before that he was Chief Inspector of Schools at the Office for Standards in Education from 2002.

== Early life and career ==
Bell studied history and philosophy at Glasgow University and obtained his Postgraduate Certificate in Education (PGCE) from Jordanhill College of Education. He also has a Master of Education degree in management and administration from Glasgow University. Bell then held teaching posts at primary schools in Glasgow, moving on to become a deputy head, and then a headteacher at Kingston Primary School, in Thundersley, Essex.

== Educational administration ==
In 1990, Bell became assistant director of education at Newcastle City Council. During this time he spent a year as a Harkness Fellow at Georgia State University, Atlanta, studying education and local government reform across the United States of America. Bell trained as an Ofsted team inspector in 1993. He became a Registered Inspector in 1994 and carried out inspections in primary schools. He was promoted to director of education and libraries at Newcastle City Council in 1995 and became chief executive of Bedfordshire County Council in 2000.

== Educational standards ==
Bell took up his post as Her Majesty's Chief Inspector of Schools on 1 May 2002. He was Chief Inspector for over three years and, in January 2006, he became Permanent Secretary at the Department for Education and Skills, named the Department for Children, Schools and Families from June 2007, and then the Department for Education from May 2010.

== University of Reading ==
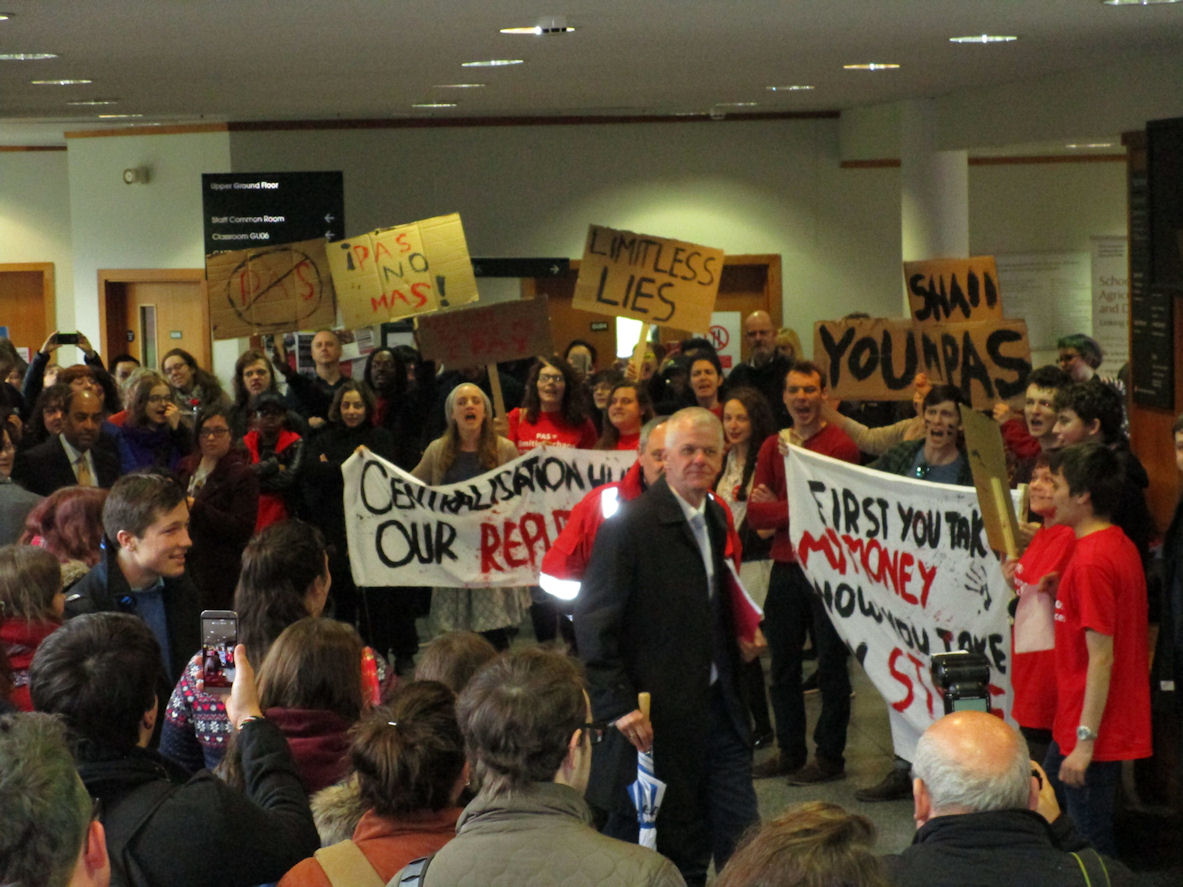
Bell faces student protests

In September 2012, Bell left the civil service to become the vice-chancellor of the University of Reading. He succeeded Acting Vice-Chancellor Tony Downes.

In 2016 a move to reorganise the structure of Reading University provoked student protests. On 21 March 2016, staff announced a vote of no confidence in Bell, the no-confidence motion being backed by 88% of those who voted.

Bell left the University of Reading in September 2018 and was succeeded by Robert Van de Noort as acting vice-chancellor. Bell had left "under a cloud", according to Times Higher Education when it emerged that Reading had returned a £20 million deficit, largely because of its Malaysia campus.

== University of Sunderland ==
Bell began his new role as Vice-Chancellor and Chief Executive of the University of Sunderland on 24 September 2018. He announced the closure of history, politics, modern languages and public health courses, and of research in those fields, on 13 January 2020.

=== National Glass Centre ===
Bell announced on 12 January 2023 that the National Glass Centre building would be closed (and probably demolished) within 3 years. Bell says that due to the cost of the relocation estimated at £9.4million, it has instead decided to close the course in summer 2026, with recruitment stopping from September 2024. This is despite a £250million capital development budget for the University and will shutter the centre, which is a heritage and history of glassmaking at Sunderland since the 7th century. As a consequence, the university announced on 22 March 2024 that its glass and ceramics academic programme will close in summer 2026.

=== Restructuring, voluntary severances, and layoffs ===
Under Bell's leadership, staff at the University of Sunderland have faced departmental restructuring and combining of faculties and voluntary severance offers with caveats that if not enough voluntary severance offers are taken, targeted layoffs and redundancies will be undertaken. On 30 September 2024, the University and Colleges Union (UCU) warned the institution is considering 76 redundancies, including 60 out of 549, more than one in ten, of its academic staff. The union added: "This is the second formal notification of redundancies in under six months. In neither this, nor the previous notification, were any management jobs put at risk." It is of note that during this period of layoffs and restructuring, a new executive member of staff was appointed, for the position of Pro Vice Chancellor of Learning and Teaching.

=== Parking fees ===
In May 2024, it was announced that parking at the University of Sunderland would see a rise from £1.30 to £6 per day – or 462% – and from 35p to £1.60 per hour. This has seen calls for the price to return to the previous rate from the student and staff unions.

=== Graduation fees ===
In 2024, the university introduced a £30.00 per guest charge for any students who wish to bring family or friends to their graduation ceremony. Previously free, the Student's Union has a petition online calling for this to be removed, in recognition of the increased cost of living and job insecurity that students are facing.

== Honours ==
Bell was appointed Knight Commander of the Order of the Bath (KCB) in the 2011 Birthday Honours and a Deputy Lieutenant of Tyne & Wear in 2020.

== Notes ==
Government offices
| Preceded by Sir Mike Tomlinson | Chief Inspector of Ofsted; 2002–2006 | Succeeded by Maurice Smith; Acting |
| Preceded by Sir David Normington | Permanent Secretary of the Department for Education and Skills; 2006–2007 | Succeeded by Himself as Permanent Secretary of the Department for Children, Schools and Families |
| Preceded by Himself as Permanent Secretary of the Department for Education and Skills | Permanent Secretary of the Department for Children, Schools and Families; 2007–2010 | Succeeded by Himself as Permanent Secretary of the Department for Education |
| Preceded by Himself as Permanent Secretary of the Department for Children, Schools and Families | Permanent Secretary of the Department for Education; 2010–2012 | Succeeded by Tom Jeffery; Acting |
Academic offices
| Preceded by Tony Downes; Acting | Vice-Chancellor of the University of Reading; 2012–2018 | Succeeded by Robert Van de Noort |
| Preceded by Shirley Atkinson | Vice-Chancellor of the University of Sunderland; 2018–present | Incumbent |
