= RSSL =

RSSL could refer to one of several things:

- Radio Society of Sri Lanka
- Reading Scientific Services Ltd.
- The Radiation and Solid State Physics Lab of New York University
- Reuters Source Sink Library
