= Robert Van de Noort =

Dutch historian and archeologist

Robert Van de Noort CBE DL

Vice Chancellor of the University of Reading
- Incumbent
- Assumed office September 2018
- Preceded by: David Bell

Personal details
- Born: Robert Adrianus Leonardus Van de Noort
- Education: Utrecht University (BA); University of Amsterdam (Drs); University of Exeter (PhD)

Robert Adrianus Leonardus Van de Noort CBE DL is a Dutch-British historian and archaeologist who is the vice-chancellor and the chief executive of the University of Reading. He is the chair of the Thames Regional Flood and Coastal Committee (RFCC). He worked at the University of Exeter (2000–2014) where he was the dean of the College of Social Sciences and International Studies. Van de Noort worked from 1988 to 1989 at the British School in Rome, from 1989 to 1991 at the Rotterdam Archaeology Unit, and then he went to the University of Hull (1992–2000). He is a Fellow of the Society of Antiquaries of London and a Principal Fellow of the Higher Education Academy.

== Early career ==
Van de Noort studied history at the University of Utrecht and Archaeology at the University of Amsterdam. He worked at the British School in Rome (1988–89), and the Rotterdam Archaeology Unit (1989–1991) before moving to Britain, where he became the manager of the Humber Wetlands Project (1992–2000) and the director of the Centre for Wetland Archaeology (1996–2000), both at the University of Hull.

In 2001 he was appointed senior lecturer in archaeology at the University of Exeter, moving on to became head of department and then head of the School of Geography, Archaeology and Earth Resources from 2003 to 2008. He also was the university's dean of the Faculty of Graduate Research and the dean of the College of Social Sciences and International Studies.

== University of Reading ==
Van de Noort joined the University of Reading in 2014 as pro-vice chancellor. He served as deputy vice-chancellor before becoming acting vice-chancellor in 2018 and vice-chancellor in 2019.

Upon taking up the role, Van de Noort personally requested the vice-chancellor's salary on appointment be reduced below the £220–£280k range. This request resulted in a basic pay of £195,000 in 2018/19 compared to £264,809 received by his predecessor, Sir David Bell, in 2017/18. Van de Noort had a reported salary of £235,000 in 2023/24 which is below the sector average of £325,000.

In 2019, the University of Reading launched an inquiry into a potential conflict of interest. The university investigated whether it had improperly benefited from the sale of land belonging to the National Institute for Research in Dairying trust, of which the University of Reading is the sole trustee, with the £121m from the sales having been spent by the university. Van de Noort explained "[w]e are confident that appropriate governance arrangements are now in place relating to the university’s management of the trust, and the designation of the money as a loan has no wider implications for the university’s ongoing financial position.”

In 2021, as vice-chancellor at Reading, Van de Noort was involved in controversy with the students' union over tuition fee refunds. He refused the union's request to cancel tuition fees for the year, following concerns over online teaching during the COVID-19 pandemic and reduced contact time.

In April 2023, Van de Noort issued a formal apology to Conservative MP James Sunderland, whose invitation to speak at the University of Reading was rescinded by the university's student body due to his views on immigration. Van de Noort invited Sunderland to speak at the university at a later date.

In 2024, students at the University of Reading set up an encampment on campus in support of Gaza. The students demanded the university take a formal position on war crimes being perpetrated in the conflict, divest from companies involved in supporting Israel’s military, provide more assistance to Palestinian students fleeing conflict, and safeguard freedom of speech on campus to allow students and staff to speak up without fear of repercussions. Van de Noort responded explaining that if the university took a formal position it would undermine the work of the university's independent experts. He confirmed that university policy specifically excludes investments in weapons and arms companies, that the university is a University of Sanctuary, and that he supports the freedom of expression and right of protest.

During his tenure, Van de Noort has been a supporter of academic freedom of expression. As a result of a research seminar held by the university's School of Law in 2022, the university was accused of acting unlawfully, creating a hostile environment for trans and other colleagues, students and visitors, and failing to follow its own policies. Van de Noort stated "we strive to be a safe space for people of all backgrounds, orientations and perspectives. But creating safe spaces cannot, and must not, be used for shutting down genuine academic debate ... [n]one of us, though, has a right to not be offended by somebody’s views. We have an obligation to respect and allow others to express views we disagree with, even those we find upsetting and hurtful."

In 2024, when speaking at the Houses of Parliament, Van de Noort continued his support and stated "[w]e need to be bold when protecting academic freedom, and we need to tread lightly when entering current debates. If we do not, universities risk becoming less universal and more homogenous, and that’s a big risk to society."

Van de Noort was appointed Commander of the Order of the British Empire (CBE) in the 2024 New Year Honours for services to science, flood risk management and sustainability. In October 2024, Van de Noort was appointed a deputy lieutenant of Berkshire.
