= Early Modern Research Centre (University of Reading) =

The Early Modern Research Centre (EMRC) at the University of Reading brings together scholars in English, history, politics, and classics. The centre supports Master's students pursuing degrees in early modern English and early modern history.

The EMRC sponsors academic conferences, colloquia, and seminars and hosts the Palgrave Macmillan book series Early Modern Literature in History.

Faculty associated with the EMRC include:

- Cedric Brown (English)
- Alan Cromartie (Politics)
- Rachel Foxley (History)
- Chloë Houston (English)
- Richard Hoyle (History)
- Mark Hutchings (English)
- Helen King (Classics)
- Esther Mijers (History)
- Mary Morrissey (English)
- Michelle O’Callaghan (English)
- Helen Parish (History)
- Stephen Taylor (History)
- David Trim (Department of Humanities, Newbold College)
- Carolyn D. Williams (English)

== Further Information ==
- Early Modern Research Centre official website
- Early Modern Studies at the University of Reading, postgraduate program
