= Andrew Mangham =

Literary critic

Andrew Mangham is a British literary critic and professor at the University of Reading. He is best known for his work on Victorian literature.

== Books ==
Mangam is the author of:

- We Are All Monsters: How Deviant Organisms Came to Define Us (2023)
- The Science of Starving in Victorian Literature, Medicine, and Political Economy (2020)
- Dickens's Forensic Realism: Truth, Bodies, Evidence (2017)
- Violent Women and Sensation Fiction: Crime, Medicine and Victorian Popular Culture (2007)

His edited volumes include:

- Literature and Medicine: Vol. I, The Eighteenth Century; Vol. II, The Nineteenth Century (with Clark Lawlor, 2021)
- The Cambridge Companion to Sensation Fiction (2013)
- The Female Body in Medicine and Literature (with Greta Depledge, 2011)
- Wilkie Collins: Interdisciplinary Essays (2007)
