= Emily Black =

British environmental scientist

Emily Black is a British environmental scientist. As of July 2024, she is Professor of Meteorology at the University of Reading and a senior research fellow at the National Centre for Atmospheric Science (Climate).

== Background and scientific career ==
Black completed an MA in Natural Sciences at Gonville and Caius College, University of Cambridge in 1996 and a PhD at Wolfson College, University of Oxford in 1999. She moved to the National Centre for Atmospheric Science (Climate) at the University of Reading in 2000 and was promoted to Professor in 2018. Black leads the Tropical Applications of Meteorology using Satellite data (TAMSAT) programme, which provides early warning of rainfall excess and deficit for the whole of Africa.

== Research interests ==
Black's research focuses on variability in the hydrological cycle and its associated hazards, particularly those relating to human impacts. She is an expert in land-atmosphere interactions and their impact on climate. Black also advises on policy and response to changing rainfall, primarily through the TAMSAT programme.

== Awards and honours ==
2021 Times Higher Education (THE) Awards Research Project of the Year (STEM) for work on TAMSAT

2020 The Royal Meteorological Society Hugh Robert Mill Award, which recognises original research related to rainfall.

2016 Appointed Associate Editor for the Royal Meteorological Journal, Atmospheric Science Letters
