= Rebellion Research =

American investment management firm

Rebellion Research, LLC
- Industry: Investment management
- Founded: 2003
- Founders: Alexander Fleiss, Jonathan Sturges, Jeremy Newton, Spencer Greenberg
- Headquarters: 350 East 54th Street, New York, New York, United States
- Key people: Alexander Fleiss (CEO)
- Website: www.rebellionresearch.com

Rebellion Research is a think tank and investment management firm and robo-advisor based in New York City established in 2003 by co-founders Alexander Fleiss, Jonathan Sturges, Jeremy Newton, and Spencer Greenberg.

Fleiss, Newton, and Sturges met at a math class at Amherst College, and later partnered with Greenberg, a graduate of Columbia University.

The fund is known for using Bayesian networks to generate market predictions. Their algorithm, nicknamed "Star," provides a human trader with a list of recommendations in the morning, which the trader implements.

Rebellion Research was one of the first firms on Wall Street to use artificial intelligence in 2006.
