= List of halls of residence at the University of Reading =

This is a list of halls of residence at the University of Reading.

The university's halls are managed in the following groups: Lakeside, comprising Bridges, Bulmershe and Wessex; Northcourt, comprising Sibly, Sherfield, Benyon and St Patrick's Hall; Park, comprising Childs, Greenow, McCombie, Mackinder, Stenton, Windsor and Dunsden Crescent; Redlands, comprising Hillside, Martindale, St. George's, St Andrew's (formerly), Wells and Wantage; and Estates Management, comprising 35 Upper Redlands Road, Mansfield and St. David's.

There are privately managed halls which include; Kendrick Hall and Crown House (by Unite Students), Saxon Court Apartments (by Collegiate AC), Loddon House and Kings Road (by Fawley Bridge Student Accommodation) and Reading Central Studios (by Fresh Student Living).

== Wantage Hall ==
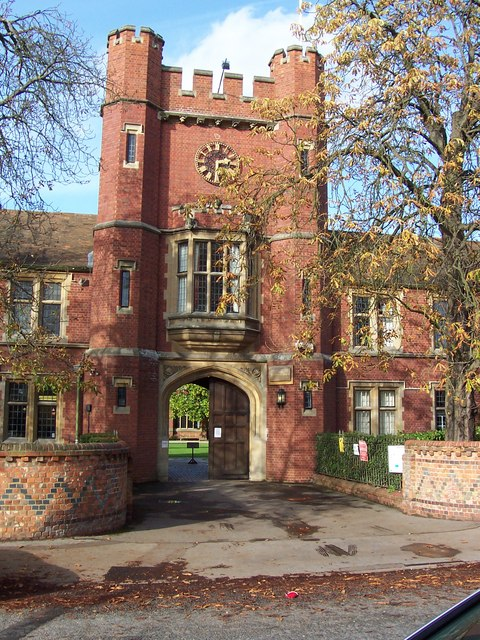
Wantage Hall

Wantage Hall is a historic residence that was built in 1908. It is a Grade II listed building and was requisitioned by the government during both World War I and II, in the latter by RAF Technical Training Command.

== St Patrick's Hall ==
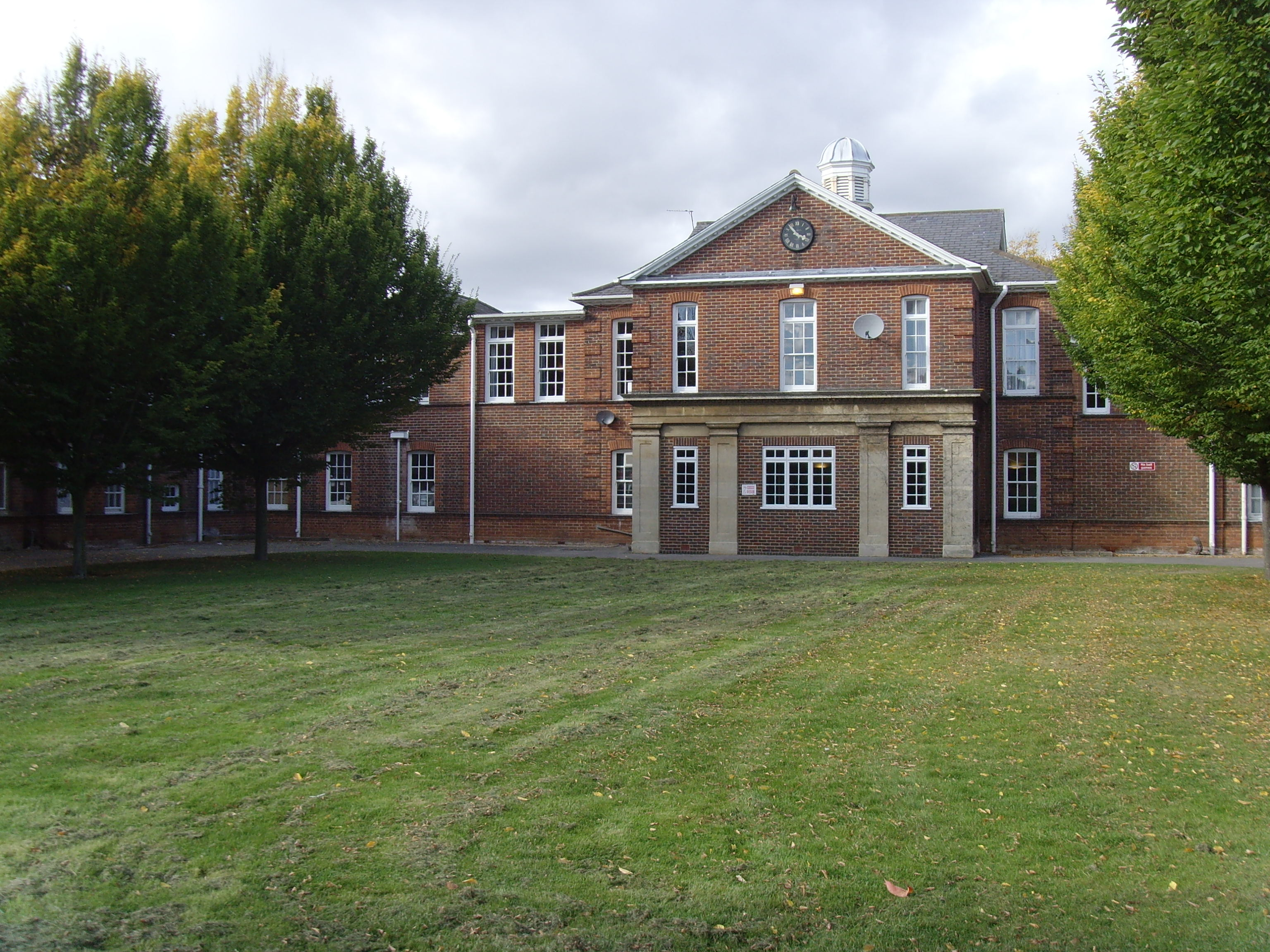
Pearson Court, of St Patrick's Hall

St Patrick's Hall, founded in 1908 by R. L. Pearson as a private hostel, and taken over in 1909 by the then 'University College, Reading', is the second oldest hall of residence at the University of Reading. Professor V. Mallinson, who later became warden of Whiteknights Hall, observed that Pearson was in many ways a model warden who truly cared about his students and thus Mallinson tried to emulate his approach at Whiteknights. The hall consists of Pearson Court (built in 1913 and named after the first warden) and New Court (opened in 1960 but recently refurbished).

The hall is situated west of Whiteknights Park (the university's main campus) on Northcourt Avenue. It is located in the Earley and Woodley UK Parliament constituency (Redlands Ward).

The hall motto is "facta non forma" which is Latin for "deeds not image", and the hall colour is dark green. The hall crest features two snakes encircling a flame and is engraved on the wall above the study room in Pearson Court.

The hall celebrates St Patrick's Day with a formal ball on or around the day for all students staying in the hall. First year and some final year students live at the hall which has catered accommodation.

The university proposed demolishing the hall but the decision was reversed following a campaign by the Victorian Society.

== Whiteknights Hall ==
An experimental project by the University Grants Committee Architect's Group, the hall consisted of two quads joined by a dining hall and JCR. It has since been demolished, though a crescent of later ensuite rooms survives.

== Benyon Hall ==
Self-catered accommodation with en-suite rooms.

== Bridges Hall ==
In 2012, UPP and the University announced that they would be redeveloping Bridges Hall and Sibly Hall. Bridges Hall reopened for the 2014–15 academic year.

== Bulmershe Hall ==
Ceased in 2012. The Hall was on the site of Bulmershe Court, formerly the Bulmershe College of Higher Education, an institution taken over by the University of Reading in 1989. The Hall was converted into private flats when the University ceased operation on the campus in 2012.

== Childs Hall ==
Opened in October 2012, and located directly on campus.

== Dunsden Crescent ==
Includes a catered meal package.

== Greenow and McCombie ==
Self-catered accommodation for 130 residents.

== Mackinder Hall ==
Opened in 2010, offers 563 en-suite rooms. The rooms are grouped into 8-room flats, each with a communal open-plan kitchen and living room. The hall consists of a series of 5 story houses grouped around a courtyard (Ashbury, Blewbury, Cholsey, Enbourne, Fawley and Hurley - all small settlements around Reading).

== Sherfield Hall ==
Self-catered accommodation covering two areas.

== Stenton Hall ==
Self-catered hall with en-suite rooms.

== Stenton Townhouses ==
Opened in 2012, contains 300 self-catered rooms split over 25 houses.

== St George’s Hall ==
A historic hall, St George's was founded in 1939 as an accommodation for over 100 female students. Since then, it has expanded, and today offers self-catered accommodation to around 400 male and female students.

== Wessex Hall ==
Wessex Hall is a mixed, self-catered, shared bathroom hall on the edge of the Whiteknights campus.

== Windsor Hall ==
All rooms include a catered meal package.
