= ICMA Centre =

Centre of higher education in Berkshire, England

Coordinates: 51.4424°N 0.9466°W

- Type: Undergraduate, Postgraduate, Executive Education, Research
- Established: 1991
- Affiliations: Reuters, CFA Institute, FINRA, PRMIA, EURO MTS, ICMA
- Dean: Prof. John Board
- Administrative staff: ca.59
- Students: ca.250
- Undergraduates: ca.50
- Postgraduates: ca.300
- Doctoral students: ca.29
- Location: Reading, Berkshire, England, UK
- Campus: Whiteknights Campus
- Website: www.icmacentre.ac.uk

The International Capital Market Association Centre (or ICMA Centre) is a department of the Henley Business School within the University of Reading, based in the English town of Reading, Berkshire. It offers undergraduate, postgraduate and executive education tailored to the capital markets industry.

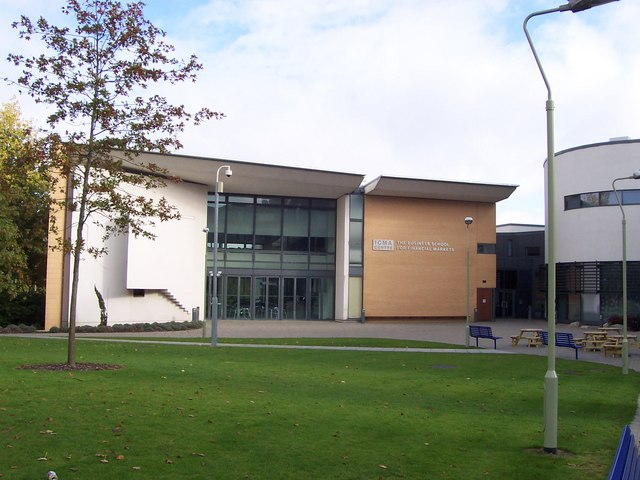
The ICMA Centre

Established in 1991 with funding provided by the International Capital Market Association (ICMA) in Zurich through a partnership with the University of Reading, the centre is housed in a purpose-built modernist building, and was formally opened in March 1998 by Sir Brian Unwin, then President of the European Investment Bank.

The centre's facilities include three dealing rooms where students learn how markets function and apply theory through simulations. The centre also provides two lecture theatres, several seminar rooms, information seating area and café bar. The upper floor of the centre houses the administrative and academic staff and doctoral researchers.

In 2008, ICMA invested a further £5 million, which funded an expansion to the building. The extension includes the flagship 40 seat dealing room - the largest in Europe – which is sponsored in part by Thomson Reuters, as well as a 170-seat lecture theatre, new seminar rooms and a dedicated research area. The building is fitted with audio and visual technology allowing the podcasting and webstreaming of lecture content. The new building opened for students at the start of the 2009–2010 academic session.

ICMA's investment in the centre now totals over £10 million, making it the largest single corporate investment in any European business school.

== Dealing rooms ==
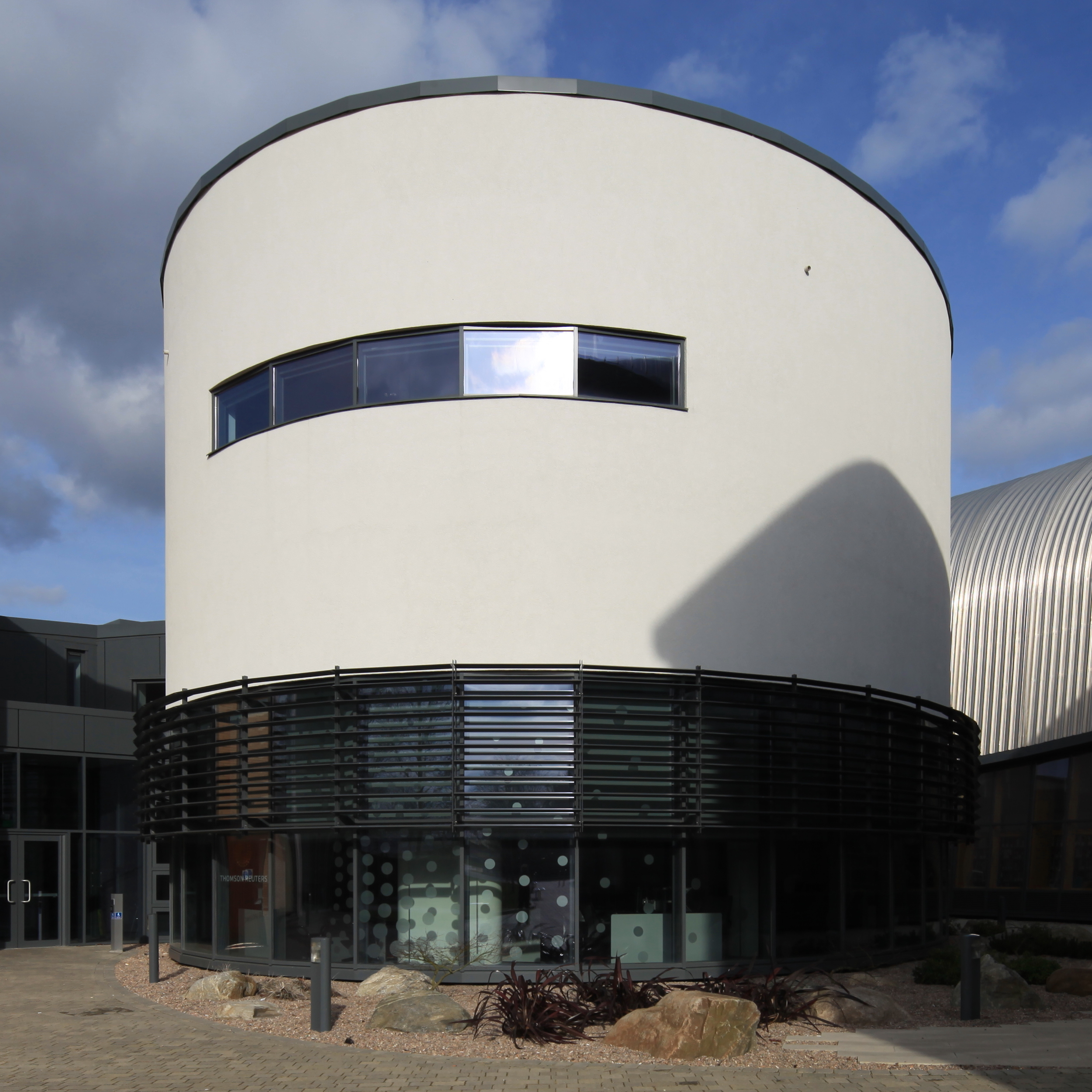
Thomson Reuters dealing rooms

The ICMA Centre provides three dealing rooms to complement theoretical learning. In 1994, a 20 terminal dealing room was opened and then on completion of the new building in 1998 a further two dealing rooms (Reuters I and II) opened with 62 workstations running Reuters products – 3000 Xtra and the Reuters Traders product. These are complemented by the Bloomberg terminal, which provides a tool for fixed income research.

Research and project work are supported by economic and financial data from Datastream, ICMA and other sources and analytical, mathematical and statistical software. Reuters I also features a plasma screen displaying live market prices and news.

The ICMA Centre is the largest non-investment bank Thomson Reuters populated facility in the world, having over 100 workstations, which is the size of a medium-sized investment bank's dealing floor.

The dealing rooms are also used for computing work throughout the programmes, including Excel spreadsheet modelling, Monte Carlo simulation, financial econometrics and sessions on market microstructure.
