= Tom Jeffery =

Sir Thomas Baird Jeffery, CB (born 11 February 1953) is a British retired civil servant who was Director General for Children, Young People and Families at the Department for Education. He served as Acting Permanent Secretary on several occasions, notably for three months from December 2011 to March 2012.

== Early life ==
Jeffery, son of George Herbert Jeffery and Margaret (née Thornton), was educated at King's School, Canterbury, before going up to Jesus College, Cambridge. He graduated from Cambridge with the degree of MA, before further attending the Centre for Contemporary Cultural Studies at the University of Birmingham.

== Career ==
Jeffery joined the Civil Service in 1981 in the Department of Education and Science (DES) and was promoted up the grades. In 1998 he was appointed Head of Children Services at the Department of Health, where he served until his appointment as Director of the Children & Families Group at DfES in 2001. He was Director-General of Children Young People & Families at the Department for Education from 2003 until 2011.

== Personal life ==
In 1987 he married Alison Nisbet, and they have two children, Caroline and Hugh.

He is the author of various articles on educational matters and is a member of Marylebone Cricket Club, and keen supporter of Lewes FC.

== Honours ==
Jeffery was appointed a Companion of the Order of the Bath (CB) in 2006. In the 2015 Queen's Birthday Honours, he was appointed a Knight Bachelor 'for services to the Department for Education', and therefore granted the title 'sir'.

Government offices
Preceded by Sir David Bell	Permanent Secretary; Department for Education; 2012	Succeeded by Chris Wormald
