= Reading Scientific Services =

Reading Scientific Services Ltd. (RSSL) is a British company that provides scientific analysis, consultancy, product development and training to the global food, drink, healthcare, pharmaceutical, biopharmaceutical and consumer goods sectors. It has been inspected by regulatory authorities including the U.S. Food and Drug Administration, the Medicines and Healthcare products Regulatory Agency and the United Kingdom Accreditation Service.

RSSL was formed in 1987 out of Cadbury Schweppes Research and Development. It is a wholly owned subsidiary of Mondelēz International. RSSL is based at two sites on the Whiteknights Campus of the University of Reading. The headquarters and main laboratories are based at the Reading Science Centre.

RSSL offers a range of testing services including Pharmaceutical, Biopharmaceutical and Food & Consumer Goods testing.

BioPharmaceutical testing services include Biopharma Forced Degradation Studies, Biopharma GMP Release Testing, Biosimilar Characterisation, Biopharma Stability Studies, Extractables & Leachables, Glycosylation Analysis, Mycoplasma Testing, Process & Product Related Impurities, Protein, Peptide & Glycoprotein Analysis and Subvisible Particle Analysis

GMP Quality Control Analysis services include Finished Product & Release Testing, Herbals & Natural Products, ICH Stability Studies, Medical Devices, Method Transfer, Microbiological Analysis, Pharmacopoeial Analysis, Sub-visible Particle Analysis

Problem Solving & Contaminant Identification services include Contamination Chemical, Contamination Physical, Counterfeit Investigation, Impurity Isolation & Sample Purification, Process & Product Related Impurities, Pharmaceutical Consultancy, Physical & Structural Characterisation, Sub-visible Particle Analysis and a 24/7 Emergency Response Service.

R&D Support Services include Biopharma Forced Degradation Studies, Extractables & Leachables, Formulation & Support, ICH Stability Studies, Impurity Isolation & Sample Purification, Method Development & Validation, Pharmaceutical Cleaning Validation, Physical & Structural Characterisation, Protein, Peptide & Glycoprotein Analysis

Food & FMCG Testing Services include Allergen Management and Ingredient and Product Analysis

Allergen Analysis services consist of Allergen Consultancy, Allergen Training, Food Consultancy & Training

Ingredient & Product Analysis services include Authenticity, Claim Substantiation, Fats & Oils Analysis, Flavour & Aroma Profiling, Genetically Modified Food, Meat & Fish Species Identification, Natural Product & Supplement Analysis, Olive Oil & Speciality Oil Authenticity, Physical & Structural Properties, Vitamin Analysis
