= Tony Downes =

British academic

Tony Downes is the Deputy Vice-Chancellor and Professor of Law of the University of Reading.

Downes specialises in commercial law and was educated at the University of Oxford and Aix-Marseille University.
