= Thomas E. Jeffrey =

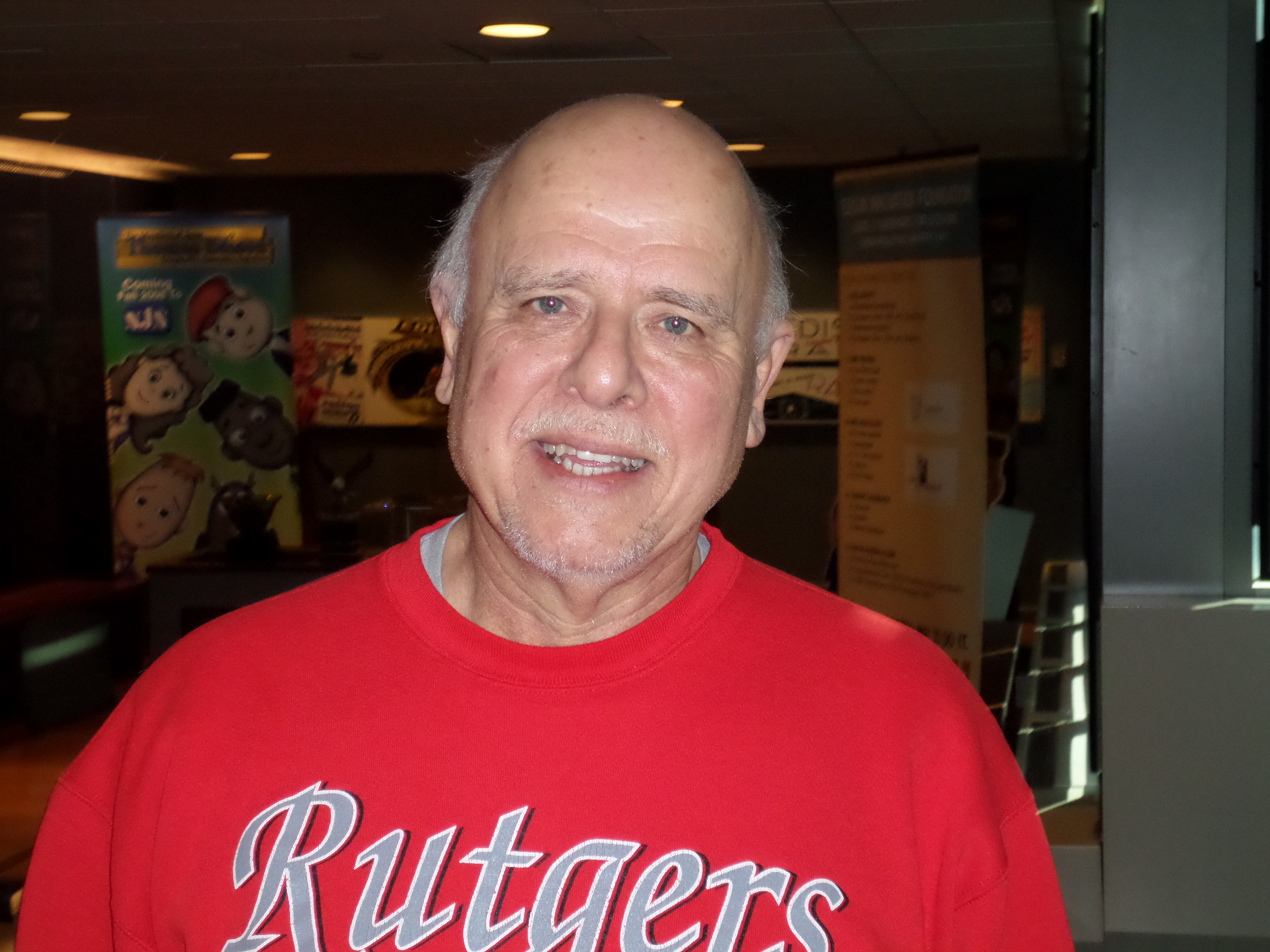
Thomas Edward Jeffrey (Jan 2017)

Thomas Edward Jeffrey (born September 5, 1947) was an adjunct professor at Rutgers, The State University of New Jersey, where he taught American History from the time period of the French-Indian War up until the Civil War. He is now retired from the National Park Service and the Edison Papers.

== Early life and education ==
Jeffrey graduated from the Catholic University of America.

== Career ==
Jeffrey worked as a microfilm editor of the Benjamin Henry Latrobe Papers in Maryland from 1972 to 1977. He was then a visiting assistant professor of history at Vanderbilt University in Nashville, Tennessee, until 1979, at which time he became an associate director and microfilm editor of the Thomas Edison Papers at Rutgers University in New Jersey.

Jeffrey is the author of three books: From Phonographs to U-Boats: Edison and His “Insomnia Squad” in Peace and War, 1911-1919, Thomas Lanier Clingman: Fire Eater from the Carolina Mountains, and State Parties and National Politics: North Carolina, 1815-1861 . According to World Cat, this book is in 244 libraries.

Jeffrey has written a number of papers about the history and politics of North Carolina. He has also edited a guide to the Thomas Edison papers.

== Personal ==
Jeffrey has a wife and a son and lives in New Jersey.
