= Henley Business School =

School of the University of Reading, UK

Coordinates: 51°33′47″N 0°52′57″W

Henley Business School is a business school which is affiliated with the University of Reading. It was formed by merging the previously independent Henley Management College (formerly the Administrative Staff College) with the existing business school of the University of Reading. As a result of the merger it now occupies two sites: Greenlands Campus, near the town of Henley-on-Thames, the original site of the Henley Management College, and Whiteknights Campus in Reading.

As of 2020 the school had triple accreditation by EQUIS, AMBA and the AACSB.

== History ==
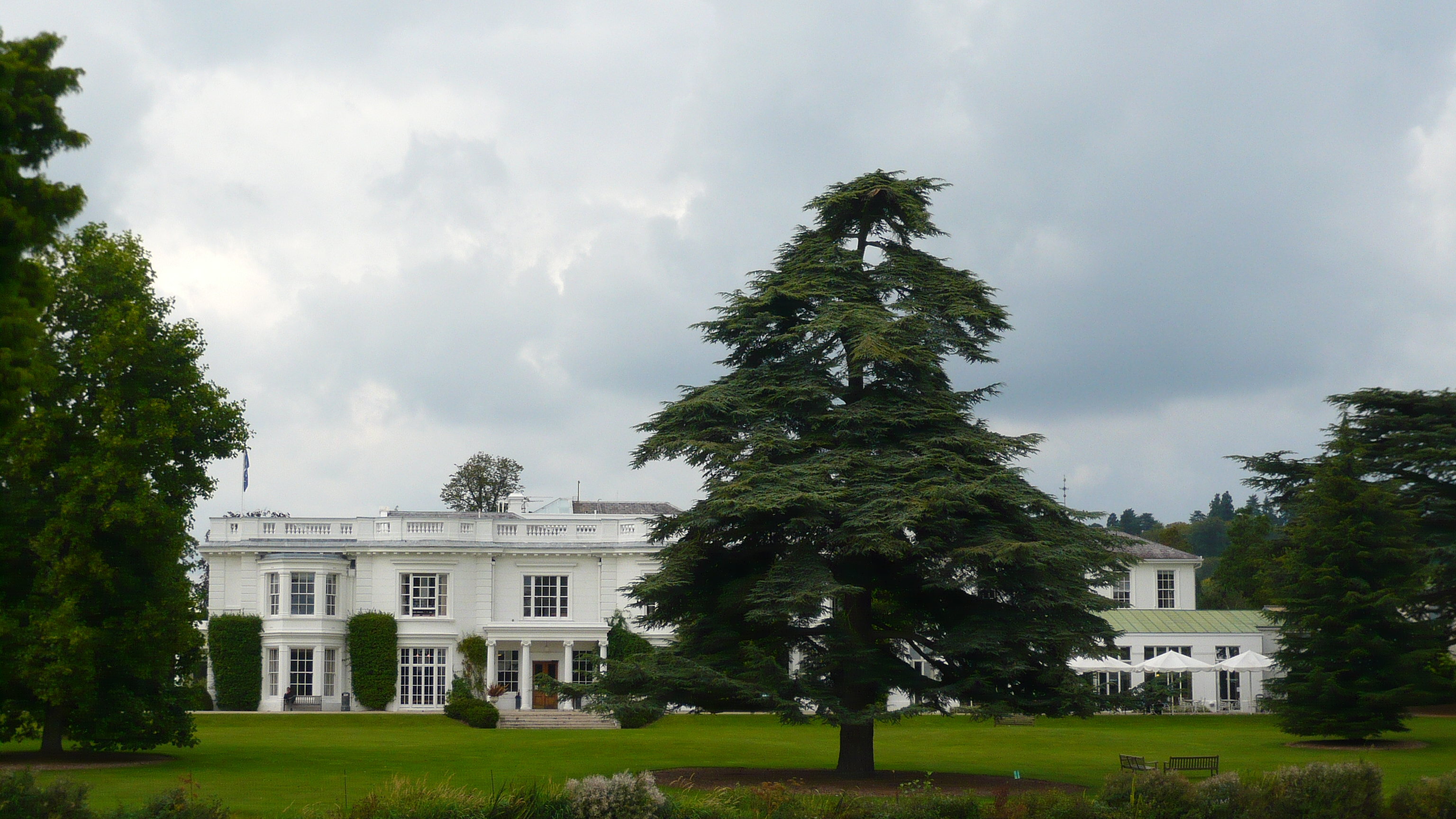
Greenlands campus on the banks of the river Thames

=== 1945-1981 ===
The Administrative Staff College was set up in 1945 at Henley-on-Thames as the civilian equivalent of the military staff colleges. It offered short courses in problems of advanced management. The college was offered the use of Greenlands by the 3rd Viscount Hambledon in 1946, and was bought outright from the family in 1952. In its early years, the college was influenced by the management consultant and writer Lyndall Urwick, the academic Hector Hetherington, the civil servant Sir Donald Banks and the businessman Sir Geoffrey Heyworth (later Lord Heyworth); its curriculum was designed by its first principal, Noel Hall. From the beginning, its intention was to bring together executives from Her Majesty's Civil Service, private business and nationalised industries to help develop their skills for promotion to senior management.

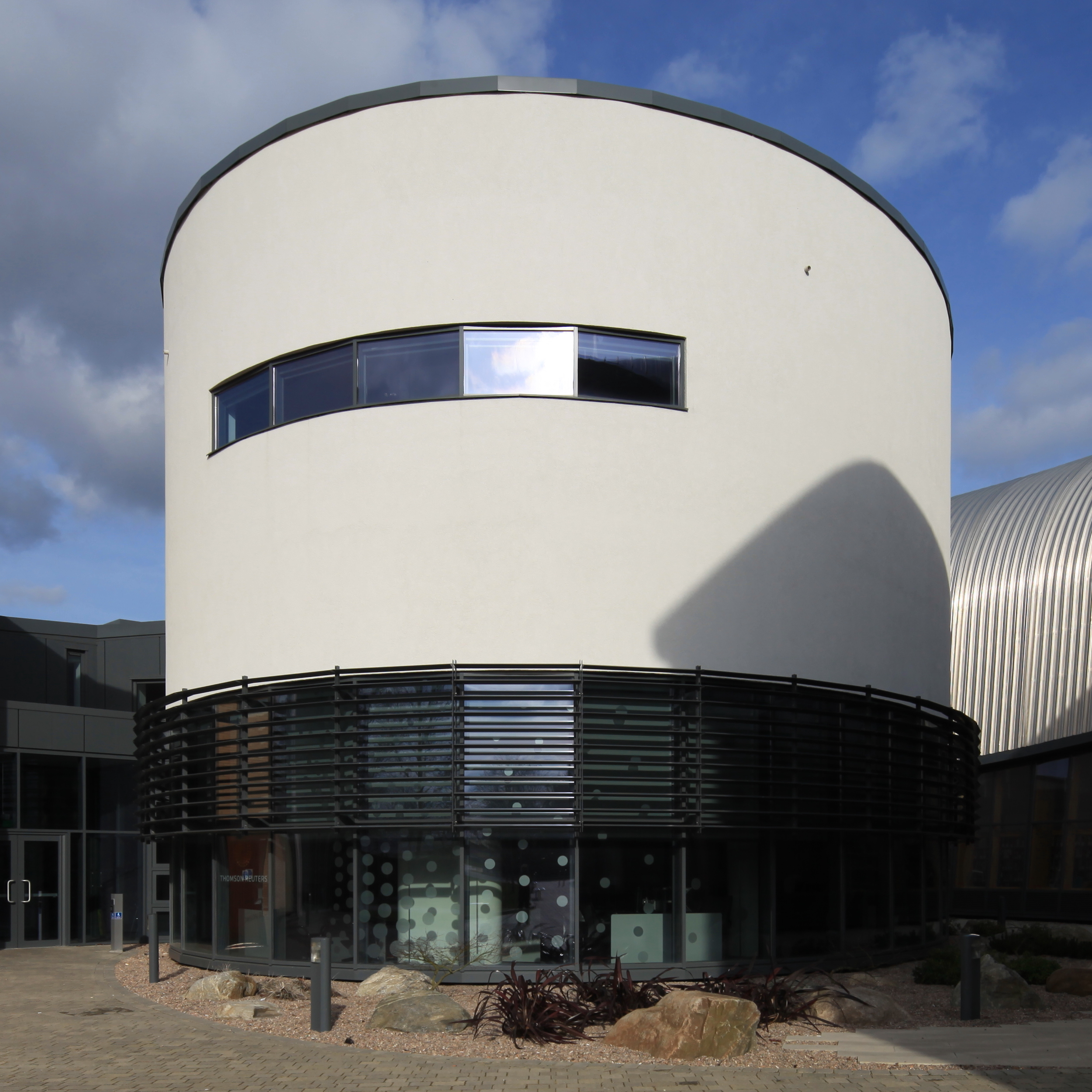
The ICMA Centre Thomson Reuters Trading Rooms

Henley ran its first Masters in Business in 1974. This was renamed MBA by the end of the 1970s.

=== 1981-2008 ===
In 1981, the college changed its name from its original title to Henley - The Management College. This was changed again to the Henley Management College when it was awarded a royal charter in 1991. In the 1980s the college's full time and part time MBA education were based at Brunel University. In the beginning the MBAs were awarded by Brunel University. By 2002, the college achieved triple accreditation status from the Association to Advance Collegiate Schools of Business (AACSB), the Association of MBAs (AMBA) and the European Quality Improvement System (EQUIS). The Greenlands campus of the college is located on the banks of the river Thames near Henley-on-Thames, on a country estate and former home of the WH Smith family.

=== 2008-present ===
In 2008, the Henley Management College merged with the University of Reading to form the Henley Business School. It consists of the School of International Business and Strategy; the School of Leadership, Organisations and Behaviour; the School of Marketing and Reputation; the School of Business Informatics, Systems and Accounting (which includes the Informatics Research Centre); the School of Real Estate & Planning; the ICMA Centre; and Executive Education Programmes. As of 2023 the dean is Elena Beleska-Spasova.

== Accreditation ==
As of 2020 Henley Business School held triple-accredited status from AMBA, EQUIS and AACSB.
