= Diomede (disambiguation) =

Diomede is the name of at least four women in Greek mythology.

Diomede may also refer to:

== Places ==
- Diomede Bay in the Sea of Japan
- Diomede Islands, in the Bering Strait
  - Big Diomede, a Russian island, part of Chukotka Autonomous Okrug, also known as Imaqliq, Inaliq, Nunarbuk or Ratmanov Island
  - Little Diomede, a U.S. island, part of Alaska
    - Diomede, Alaska, a village in the Nome Census Area of the Unorganized Borough of the U.S. state of Alaska, located on the west coast of Little Diomede Island

== People ==
- Bernard Diomède (born 1974), French footballer
- Diomede Falconio (20 September 1842 — 8 February 1917), an Italian prelate of the Roman Catholic Church.

== Arts and entertainment ==
- Diomède (opera), a French opera by Toussaint Bertin de la Doué

== Ships ==
- HMS Diomede (D92), launched in 1919
- HMS Diomede (F16), launched in 1969

== See also ==
- Diomedes (disambiguation)
- Diomed, racehorse
- Demid
- Diomid
