= Diomidis =

Diomidis Greek: Διομήδης is a Greek masculine given name. Notable people with the name include:

- Diomidis Komninos
- Diomidis Kyriakos
- Diomidis Spinellis
- Diomidis Symeonidis

== See also ==
- Diomid
- Diomedes
