= Royal Antediluvian Order of Buffaloes =

British fraternal organization

- RAOB lapel badge with Latin motto and maxim.
- Formation: 1822
- Type: Fraternal Order (Philanthropic and Charitable)
- Headquarters: 26–30 Bank Street, Wetherby LS22 6NQ
- Location: Global
- Official language: English
- Leader: Grand Primo
- Website: www.raobgle.org.uk

The Royal Antediluvian Order of Buffaloes (RAOB) is one of the largest fraternal movements in the United Kingdom, The order started in 1822 and has since spread throughout the former British Empire and elsewhere in the world. It is known as the "Buffs" to members.

== Coverage ==
Buffalo Lodges have existed widely throughout the former British Empire. Buffalo lodges have also existed in other countries not associated with the empire or the Commonwealth of Nations such as the United States of America. Lodges have existed onboard ships, at army bases, and at Royal Air Force bases. Bletchley Park had a lodge at its local pub. Most of the post-Second World War West German lodges were related to the British armed forces stationed in Germany. In the United Kingdom hundreds of pubs have been home to Buffalo Lodges.

The largest Buffalo order in history, based purely on the number of dispensations issued, is the Grand Lodge of England (GLE, also known as the Birmingham section). The GLE has issued over 10,672 "dispensations" to establish lodges in England, Wales, Scotland, Ireland, and other places around the world.

There are still a number of lodges worldwide that come under the Grand Lodge of England directly, such as Eastern Lodge 8686 in Nova Scotia.

== Membership ==
There are two types of banners in the RAOB movement: the "affiliated" orders and independents.

Membership within the affiliated orders requires that a man must be 18 years of age or over and must be a "True and Loyal Supporter of the British Crown and Constitution". There are Buffalo lodges which do not come under the affiliated orders and that have different requirements. (Note: For example, the Progressive Lodge of New Zealand only requires members to pledge allegiance to New Zealand) Lodges of the RAOB that have been set up in countries such as the United States have amended their rules to simply require that a prospective member be a "True and Loyal Supporter of the Constitution" of the country in which they operate.

The Buffalo lodge is a fun fraternity in which men of any religious or political views are allowed to join. Discussion of politics and religion are forbidden from meetings. The standard of dress is usually a shirt and tie, coat or jacket, and trousers. The Lodge is structured like an "Ancient City". The chief officer is called the Worthy Primo, and subordinate officers, as city officers. Officers wear chain collar regalia, whilst individual members have their own regalia or medals, known as jewels. Meetings are begun when members are standing and the Worthy Primo constitutes the lodge. This process varies depending on the Buffalo order. Once this formal part of lodge is complete, the lodge moves into "harmony". During harmony, mock charges are held, or brothers are asked to render items of harmony, which usually includes jokes or songs, sometimes accompanied by instruments if allowed in the respective Buffalo banner.

Most lodges meet together for fellowship and mutual social enjoyment. The desire to cultivate the spirit of brotherhood, to pool funds, for the purposes of helping others. To keep alive the old traditions, ceremonies and usages of the movement.

The Buffalo order for the most part has never been a registered friendly society. Unlike a friendly society, the Buffalos do not provide a system of benefits funded by contributions. The order in its various forms is a collective funded by the charitable giving of its members. Benevolent funds are being supported by and large by the voluntary giving of its members. The only fixed charges being the "Registration Fee", and "Initiation Fee". In most orders these are split between the lodge and the Grand Lodge, in others this is retained entirely by the minor lodge.

For much of its history Buffalo Lodges functioned as a means of raising funds to help sick and indigent members, their families, and dependents of former members. Charity has always been at the heart of the Buffaloes and as the movement grew so did the benevolent aspirations culminating in the establishment of orphanages and convalescent homes. The Buffs are regarded as charitable organisations.

In the lodges there is a small amount of ritual and ceremony. Officers wear ornate chain collars and their respective jewels. The use of aprons is not widespread at regular meetings of Buffalo lodges. New members are "initiated". After two years and having gained their intermediate certificate, the new member is then "raised" to the degree of a Certified Primo. The Knight Order of Merit and Roll of Honour degrees are granted to those who have been members of ten years or more after the raising to the second degree.

== Structure ==
The Buffalo order has three tiers:

- Minor (Private) Lodges;
- Provincial Grand Lodges (under a local governing body) and
- Grand Lodge.

Each Province may also have a Knights Chapter and Roll of Honour (RoH) Assembly. In the Grand Council Order, there is no Roll of Honour Assembly whilst in other Buffalo Orders, the Roll of Honour Assembly is called an RoH Chapel.

=== Degrees ===
Members of the Buffalo order can attain up to four levels "learning." The levels are the grades within the Buffalo movement and are called "Degrees". To attain the final level takes 10 years. In the early days, there were two degrees. The Kangaroo or First Degree, and the Primo or Second Degree.

In 1872, a higher order within the Buffaloes was formed called "The Knights of the Golden Horn", with its Headquarters in Hull and local units called Encampments set up around Great Britain. The KGH was established as a higher body to carry out and conduct ceremonies. In 1888 a number of Encampments of the Knights of the Golden Horn, split off, and became independent. Full separation did not occur from RAOB until 1926. Today the Grand United Order Knights of the Golden Horn remain in existence.

The Grand Australasian Banner has a fifth degree the Roll of Honour Chain Collar.

Another higher order was created within the Buffaloes called the Guild Companions of the Ark. It opened in 1887 by five Primos of the Order, and only had one lodge, Armenia. The Companions of the Ark disappeared before the Great Depression.

1. Brother (1st degree) (Kangaroo)
2. Certified Primo (2nd degree)
3. Knight of the Order of Merit (Knight Sir) (3rd degree)
4. Roll Of Honour (Right Honourable Sir) (4th degree)
5. Roll of Honour Chain Collar (5th Degree of the Grand Australasian Banner)

=== Minor Lodges ===
The Minor Lodges are structured along the lines of an "ancient" City. The Lodge room is properly known as "the city". There are 13 officers in a Lodge in total though in the Grand Executive Banner, there are two additional Officers, The City Physician and City Barber:

1. Worthy Primo (Sitting Primo in GEB and Grand Council) Chief Presiding Officer.
2. City Marshall (Deputy Presiding Officer equivalent to what the Odd Fellows call the Vice Grand)
3. City Secretary
4. City Treasurer
5. City Chamberlain (City Warden in the Grand Council)
6. City Tyler
7. City Constable
8. City Registrar
9. City Minstrel
10. City Waiter
11. City Taster (in Grand Council Lodges)
12. Alderman of Benevolence (Almoner of Benevolence in Grand Council Lodges)
13. City Auditors
14. Lodge Trustees x 3

The Order is structured on the lines of the classic fraternal structure, of Local Minor Lodges, Provincial Governing Authorities and a Grand Body, often styled as the Grand Lodge. All Members are known by the appellation of "Brother" with degree honorifics used in lodges.

Knights Chapters and RoH assemblies exist for members of those degrees and are operated alongside the Provincial Grand Lodges but have no function other than as ceremonial bodies. Chapters are responsible for the 3rd degree ceremony. RoH assemblies the 4th degree ceremony.

The Buffaloes were once a very large worldwide fraternal movement made up of a number of "orders" and over 15,000 lodges having been established around the globe at one point or another. The largest Buffalo order is the Grand Lodge of England (originally the Birmingham section) with over 10,672 Lodges having been issued dispensations since 1897 or before then.

=== Banners ===
By the 1850s there existed dozens of Lodges across Britain, with Mother Lodges or District Lodges, acting as the head of the movement in their respective area. Each of these Lodges or Mother Lodges worked their own ritual and had their own rules. In order to create uniformity in rules, rituals and operation, The first national Governing Body, the Grand Primo Lodge of England, was organised in 1866 as a result of a meeting of delegates from various Lodges. In the years following, various schisms emanated from the Grand Primo Lodge, owing to disagreements and infighting. The first of these was the Grand Surrey Lodge. In 1874 the Grand Primo Lodge had 112 Lodges under it. In 1897 the mother of all divisions occurred and Lodges either went with the Metropolitan movement or the Provincial (or Birmingham) Movement. The two movements would rename themselves as the Grand Lodge of England Limited (Metropolitan) and the Grand Lodge of England (Birmingham).

The Grand Lodge of England Limited is simply known as "the limited section", while the Grand Lodge of England Inc is known as the GLE. The GLE is the largest of the Buffalo orders. There have been a number of Buffalo orders, thus leading to a general opinion that there have been close to 20,000 Buffalo lodges formed since the movement began in 1822, all the result of schism after schism: the Grand Surrey Lodge, The Grand Surrey Banner (Mother Lodge) and Grand Surrey Banner (Mother Banner), Grand Middlesex Banner and Grand Executive Banner being examples of these. In their day these various orders were competing against each other with lodges of each order often meeting in the same town and it was not unusual to find in a reasonable sized town four or more Buffalo lodges of four different orders. Over time the established orders have settled their differences and now largely co-operate.

All of the different RAOB orders are very similar, save for minor differences and peculiarities. Each has Minor Lodges, which are the basic unit of the whole movement. Overseeing Minor Lodges are what is known as "Governing Authorities" and, over those, a "Grand Lodge" (or Council), made up of Grand Primo, Officers as well as delegates representing Governing Authority areas. Each Buffalo Order has a Rule Book, Manual of Instruction and Ceremony Lectures issued by the parent body. There are generally 4 Degrees of membership. Kangaroo (1st degree) Primo (2nd degree) Knight of Merit (3rd Degree) and the Roll of Honour (4th Degree).

The Grand Lodge of England was one half of two banners born from the separation of the Grand Primo Lodge, in 1897.

In the various banners, each Grand Lodge or Grand Council holds annual meetings known as "conferences" to which delegates from all the provinces attend, and at which remits are passed, and other matters dealt with.

=== Use of "Royal" ===
The Seditious Meetings Act 1817 affected the gatherings of clubs throughout Britain. To counteract this and show the Buffaloes were not subversive to the interests of the state, the Order described itself as the "Loyal Order of Buffaloes". The addition of "antediluvian" (meaning before the time of the flood in the Bible and referring to the Order's principles) occurred in the 1850s. Hence the honorifics of "royal" and "antediluvian" are simply a decoration. The movement under the Home Orders has always professed a Loyalty to the Crown and the Order was widespread amongst the British Armed Forces during the 20th century. Reference to before the flood is questionable. The usage of such an appellation being to impress upon the minds of members and the public that the movement has great antiquity. This would make sense given the preposterous list of ancient members used in the old Initiation Ceremonies.

The use of the word "Royal" in any organisational or business title in the United Kingdom requires a royal warrant from a reigning monarch. Under legislation in Section 4 (1) of the Trade Marks Act 1994, the Lord Chamberlain's Office has the right to take legal action if permission for the term "royal" is not granted. As the Buffaloes have been using the prefix "royal" since the 1840s, the Lord Chamberlain's Office permits its continued use on the grounds of long usage.

=== Dispensations ===
The Dispensation is the name given within the RAOB to the lodge warrant or charter. The name Dispensation appears to originate from the City of Lushington, which had a certificate on the wall of its meeting room, called the Dispensation.

The dispensations of lodges are issued by the Governing Body of each Order to the Minor Lodges formed under them. Such dispensation empowers the Lodges to exist and operate as part of the Order, and to initiate gentlemen into that Order.

=== Motto ===
The Latin motto of Buffalo orders is "No Man Is At All Times Wise" (Latin: Nemo Mortalium Omnibus Horis Sapit) and it has the maxim of "Justice, Truth and Philanthropy". The Grand Lodge of England also has its own motto, used by itself and its affiliated branches on the official seal, which is "In things Essential Unity, In things Doubtful Liberty and in all things Charity."

=== Lodge names and associations ===
Over the years there have been Lodges formed that were associated with various industries and professions, or named in honour of people, such as respected lodge members or prominent people in the community.

Having been started by actors and stagehands, other lodges were formed by members of the theatre profession. There have been many actors and entertainers' lodges, including up until the late 20th century in London. In Newcastle Upon Tyne in 1884, the Joey Grimaldi 150 was opened under Dispensation issued by the Grand Primo Lodge of England and is an example of a Lodge that at its formation, was connected with the theatrical trade. Over the years this seems to have significantly changed and by the time of its closure in 2018, there were no entertainers or theatre members.

There was also a Lodge that met at or in the vicinity of the Shaftsbury Theatre. Often the Lodges formed by those connected to the theatre and entertainment business had names that either demonstrated clearly their association such as simply "The Theatre Lodge", or that were named in honour of a famous theatrical personage such as "Garrick Lodge" or "Sheridan Lodge".

Over the years there have been some well-known men associated with the movement, encompassing all professions and trades including the legal profession. There was a Royal Courts of Justice Lodge GLE Ltd being an example of a Lodge connected to the Legal profession it met at the Inns of Court.

There was a Dreadnought Lodge GLE Limited, clearly a Naval Lodge. There have been Lodges connected with the Home Guard, simply using the name "Home Guard". Lodges connected with Railways often called "Railway Lodge" or something else railway related such as "Locomotive Lodge". Coal miners lodges such as Mt Rochfort Lodge No 29 GLNZ (4656 GLE). Naval and Passenger liner lodges usually have a ship's name, that is not the case with the Oriana-based lodge whose name was "Princess Alexandra" and was numbered "10051" on the Roll of the Grand Lodge of England. The now-closed Leyland Lodge was originally formed by the management of the Leyland Motor Company in the 1920s. Kings Own Military Lodge had a close connection with the British forces.

Some lodges were named simply in honour of famous personages of the day, such as General Redvers Buller or Edith Cavell. Other Lodges have been named in honour of well-respected past members such as the Mervyn Payne Lodge.

=== Absent Brothers Toast ===
The AB Toast used by the Grand Lodge of England was penned by Bro. J Ord-Hume to the Tune of Sandon Lead Kindly Light.

Spirit of truth, before we homeward wend
On thee we call
Assist us each to succor and defend
Good brethren all
From Cares and Sorrows, Absent Brethren Free
Where'er they roam, in air, on land or sea
Let thy kind spirit hover round them now
And so enthrall
That they will keep, their obligation vow
So say we all
And when on us, the ivy leaves descend
Grant we may join, thy link, our brothers friend.

=== Grand Council Absent Brothers Toast ===
First Verse of Eternal Father Strong to Save followed by fifteen seconds silence and the ode:

Let us Toast our Absent Brothers
Wheresoever they may be
Trusting soon to have them with us
Joining in our Jovial Harmony
Brothers Kept away by sickness
soon we trust their health regain
Whilst we wish good luck and safety to our Brothers on the main
Our Brothers know they are not forgotten
If on land, Air or sea
So stand your glass and drink right hearty
To our Grand RAOB
ABSENT BROTHERS
SPEEDY RETURN

== History ==
=== Early history ===
In so far as the recorded history goes, a club was formed in the Harp Tavern, Drury Lane London, by actors and entertainers in the mid 18th century, and may have included the owners of the theatre itself. The club was called the "City of Lushington" and was styled along the lines of a mock "City Council", possibly in parody of the "City of London". Named the "City of Lushington" (possibly after the drink "lush") The club had a "Lord Mayor" and "Four Aldermen". The Lord Mayor was a pompous figure in a wig and robe. The Aldermen were in charge of the four wards of the city, the aptly named "Poverty", "Juniper", "Suicide", and "lunatic" wards. In these Wards the members sat. This club was immensely popular, leading to restriction on membership as the room could not accommodate all the prospective citizens of the city. This left quite a few of the lesser lights of the acting and theatre business, including stagehands, out in the cold. In 1822 a Buffalo Society was formed in the same meeting room as the City of Lushington, and with references to the City of Lushington, such as the title and style of the Lodge Officers and the naming of the Lodge Room as "the City" practices which continue to this day. The Buffalo Society was formed by the artist Joseph Lisle and comedian William Sinnett, along with stagehands and theatre technicians, in August 1822. It drew its then name of The Buffaloes from a popular song of the time: We'll chase the Buffalo. The Buffalo Society is mentioned in Peirce Egan's "an end to life in London".

The Harponian Lodge is regarded as the first Buffalo Lodge, formed in 1822 by actors and stagehands denied membership in the City of Lushington. The date of closure of that first Buffalo Lodge is unknown.

From the outset the Buffalo Society existed for social convivial enjoyment and for benevolent purposes. By way of small fines, donations and fees, money would be raised to assist an indigent member who was in need.

The Buffalo Lodges were spread across London and further abroad by the members of the theatrical profession who were Buffs who travelled around for work. Wherever they went new Lodges were formed. When a lodge opened in a new area, it became a Mother Lodge, from which subsequent Minor Lodges would be opened. The Mother Lodge would support and advise new lodges on rules and administration of membership. These Mother Lodges developed into the body responsible for administration and organisation, and as the Order grew District Grand Lodges and later Provincial Grand Lodges were opened.

One of the "big" centres of the movement in its early days was the St Georges Tavern, home of the Grand Surrey Lodge, a popular haunt of those in the Theatre business. Several Lodges owed their allegiance to the Surrey Lodge, who was Mother to a number of Lodges. Later on, the first schism from the Grand Primo Lodge would be by those connected to the Surrey Lodge.

Well known proprietors of the Theatre Royal in Drury Lane in the 18th and 19th centuries respectively were David Garrick and later, Brinsley Sheridan. During Garrick's time managing the Theatre, it was rebuilt twice, whilst during Sheridan's tenure, the Theatre burnt down and was rebuilt. It is one of the oldest Theatres still operating in Great Britain today. Some of the names of early GLE Lodges being "Garrick" and "Brinsley Sheridan", two of the proprietors of the Theatre Royal. Another of those early GLE lodges of interest is The Clown Lodge No 32, most likely founded by clowns whilst the Shakespeare Lodge and Joey Grimaldi Lodge No 150 were both formed in Newcastle upon Tyne by actors and entertainers.

=== Early lodges ===
Grand Primo Lodge England:

- Adelphi
- Apollo
- Beehive
- Blomsbury
- Brittania
- Cardowgan
- Carlton
- Caxton
- Cock Robin
- Emanuel
- Frankling
- Hoxton
- Lambeth
- Marlborough
- The Grand Surrey
- Flowers of Forest Lodge

=== First Ten Grand Primos, Grand Primo Lodge England ===
The first ten Grand Primos were:

- 1866 Bro G.T.Wright
- 1867 Bro E Scates
- 1869 Bro.E Mitchell
- 1870 Bro.W James
- 1872 Bro.J Worth
- 1873 Bro.H Albert
- 1874 Bro.R Willis
- 1875 Bro.F.C Hunt
- 1876 Bro. C Woodward
- 1877 Bro. E Geake
- 1878 Bro. J Lewis
- 1879 Bro. J C Smith
- 1880 Bro. J Alexander
- 1881 Bro. G Eshelby
- 1882 Bro. C Ranson
- 1883 Bro. H Stroud
- 1884 Bro. H Barret
- 1885 Bro. W G Rennel
- 1886 Bro. W Hedderwick

=== GLE No 1 ===
A Lodge in Liverpool, Albion Lodge No 1, is currently at the top of the roll of the Grand Lodge of England (Birmingham Section). Its number is deceiving as the lodge was not the first to be formed under the Grand Primo Lodge. Albion has held that distinction for some time of being No 1 on the GLE (Birmingham Section Roll). In the 1920s the GLE (Birmingham Section) undertook a renumbering of lodges, with lodges moving up one to fill in spaces left by closed lodges. It was at that time that Albion became No 1.

=== The Elks ===
Charles Vivian, an actor and member of the Buffaloes was a key founding father of the Benevolent and Protective Order of Elks in the United States.

=== Overseas lodges ===
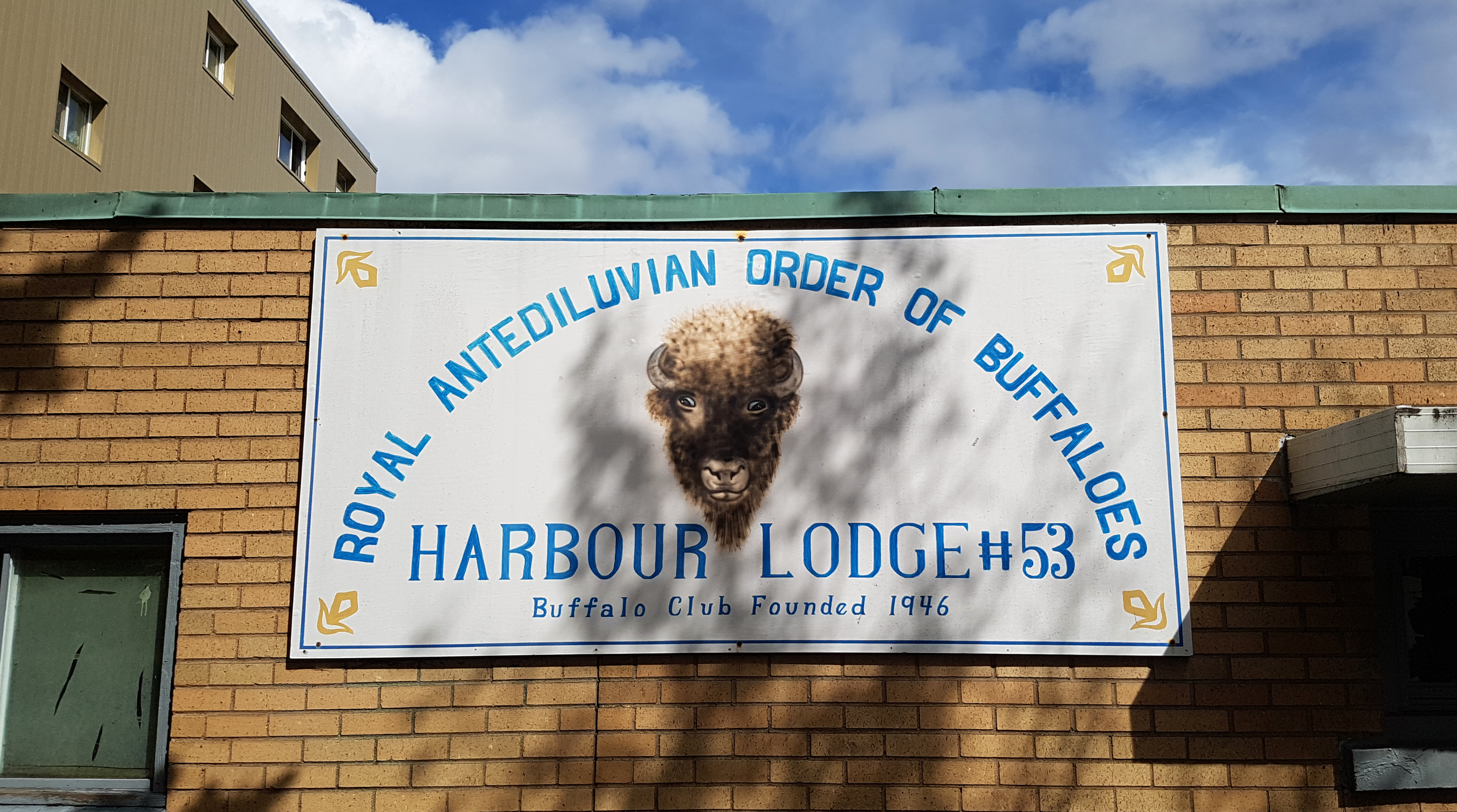
Harbour Lodge #53 in Halifax, Nova Scotia

The Buffaloes went wherever the members went. The RAOB reached Australia by the 1870s. In New Zealand, the early Lodges were concentrated in the Canterbury region and were established in the 1880s.

By the end of the 19th century, various orders of Buffaloes had spread from England to Australia, New Zealand, South Africa, Canada, Northern Ireland, Scotland, the Middle East, India, Africa, Gibraltar, Cyprus and Philippines.

=== 20th century ===
First World War RAOB GLE Ambulance c. 1916

In 1901 the first Lodge in Scotland, Clan Ord, was opened, by Bro's Johnson and Ord Hume. On the 23rd of May 1902, the Royal Edinburgh Lodge No 854 was opened. on the Roll of the Grand Lodge of England (Birmingham section). This was the second Scottish Lodge. The Third lodge to be opened up in Scotland was St Kentgern 858 in Glasgow. On February 25, 1903. Bro. J Ord Hume officially opened the Maritime Lodge No 897 GLE in Australia on behalf of the Grand Lodge of England.

The movement achieved a significant goal with the opening of one of its first orphanages, Aldridge, in 1904. This was funded by a Hapenny registration fee in every Lodge under the Grand Lodge of England. There were that many members and lodges meeting back then that the scheme paid for itself.

By 1915 the Grand Lodge of England were already into the 1000 series of numbers. By the end of 1919 the Grand Lodge of England reached over the 3000 series. In the 1920s Lodge numbers in the GLE Order were in the 4000-5000 series.

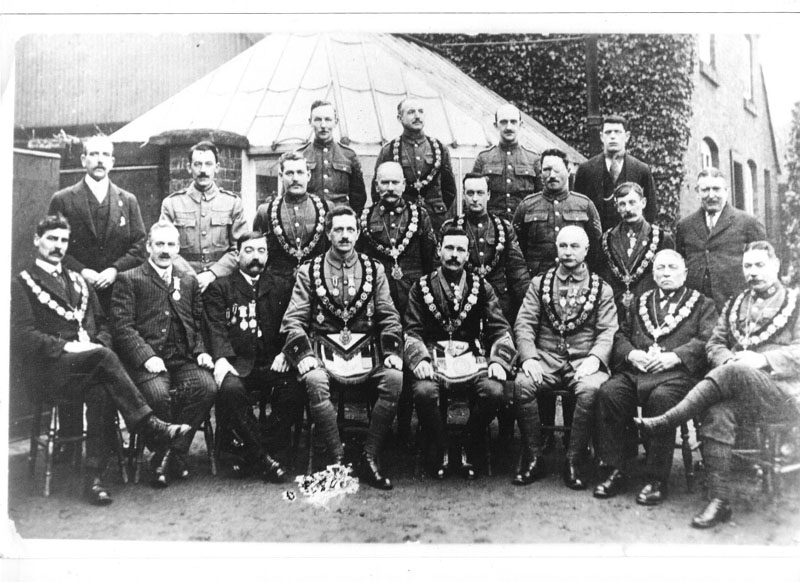
Royal Antediluvian Order of Buffaloes Civil and Military Lodge, Whittington, Staffordshire, c. 1920

The First World War led to temporary or even permanent closure of many Lodges due to the enlistment of members. The Buffs supported the war effort through supplying motor ambulances to bring wounded soldiers back from the front lines. Initially six motorised ambulances were purchased and sent with each one operated by volunteer Buffs. More followed, with the figure quoted being between 18 and 22.

Three Buffalo Lodges were formed in the back of Motor Ambulances. On their return after the war, the ambulances formed the first ambulance service in England.

In 1919 Ye Petitor Lodge No 2674 was opened which would become No 1 on the roll of Grand Lodge of New Zealand. Also in 1919, a Lodge was opened in Iraq at the Royal Air Force base. Lodges continued to be extended around the globe as well as in China, India and Germany.

The first RAOB Lodge in Germany was opened in 1920 and connected with the British Armed Forces. By 1926 a Provincial Grand Lodge of the Rheinland was opened. By that stage several Minor Lodges were in operation.

In the 1920s several Royal Naval ships had Lodges attached to them.

In 1926, Lord Alverstone succeeded in persuading the Order to purchase Grove House, Harrogate, for use as an orphanage to which every active member contributed a ha'penny (half of one old penny). When the orphanage was no longer a requirement after the state took over responsibility for orphans, the Order began a new charity fund which is still in place today.

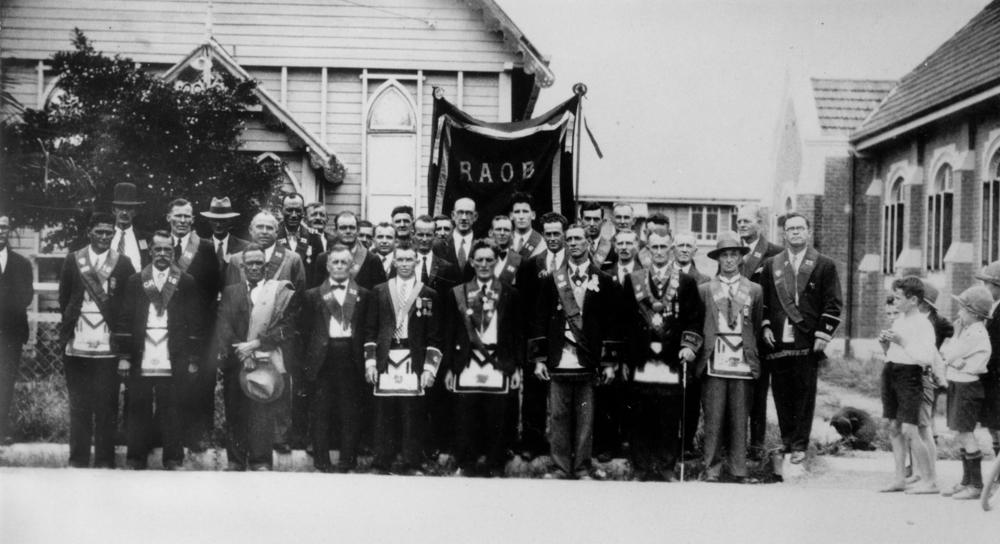
Ingham, Queensland, 1935

In the late 1920's a Lodge was opened in Baluchistan, India (closed 1949).

On 5 October 1930 the Airship the R101 Crashed in France and the resulting fire, killed most of those on board which included at least 24 members of the RAOB Bedford Province including Lord Thomson the Air Minister.

In the 1930s a very remote Buffalo Lodge was formed, the "Up the Khyber" Lodge in India, up near the border with Afghanistan, at the furthestmost British outpost.

In the 1930s the Grand Lodge of South Africa were supplied a number of dispensations in the 6000 series. This explains an anomaly why some South African Lodges continued to be opened under the 6000 series, long after that series had been surpassed by the GLE.

=== Grand Council Buffalo order ===
The Grand Council RAOB was formed in 1924 as a result of a conference of various independent Buffalo orders in Great Britain, led by the Grand Surrey Banner. The outcome was the formation of the Grand Council which then issued new dispensations to all Lodges. In New Zealand for instance, the Grand Surrey Banner Lodge No 3010 become New Zealand No 1. It lost its original English-issued number.

=== Second World War ===
Lodges continued to operate through the war years throughout the British Empire, where and when they could meet. During the Second World War, the order offered Grove House for use as a military hospital.

Two lodges stand out during the war years. They were the Changi Prisoner of War Lodge, formed without dispensation in Changi POW Camp. The other was the Hohenfels Lodge in Stalag 383.

=== Post Second World War ===
The post-war period was a boom time for the order, particularly in the British forces. There was a lodge opened in Japan as part of Japan occupation forces following the end of the war. There were Lodges opened in Royal Air Force bases all over West Germany. There was a Buffalo Lodge set up on Christmas Island. There was a Lodge opened in Korea during the Korean War as well and Lodges opened in Malaya, and Borneo and Singapore. Buffalo Lodges were opened in Royal Air Force bases in Great Britain while new Lodges were also opened in communities such as Jinja, in Uganda.

In 1949, an international convention in Glasgow reported over 1000 attendees from around 4000 lodges and was to celebrate 130 years of the Order. Sir Andrew Murray, the Lord Provost, addressed the conference.

The order continued to expand well into the 1960s. One such lodge that was formed in the 1950s under the Grand Lodge of England direct being the Eastern Lodge No 8686, Eastern Passage, Nova Scotia, Canada. New lodges continued to be formed including at Sharjah Air Force Base and Lodges at other bases, still under the RAF.

It was not just the Grand Lodge of England that experienced massive growth in the post war years.

There were over two thousand lodges under the GLE formed in the years following the Second World War. Between 1945 and 1985 new dispensations issued went from the mid 7000 series to the mid 10,000 series.

The RAOB expanded in West Germany following the Second World War with up to six provincial grand lodges being formed to manage the dozens of lodges established. Most of those lodges were connected directly with the Royal Air Force.

=== Asia ===
The early Lodges in Asia had been set up associated with the Maritime sector, British Army and industries. Hong Kong was where you would expect to find such lodges. The first Lodge in Hong Kong was in the 3000 series numbers under the GLE (Birmingham) and so would have been formed in or around 1919–1920. Singapore was the next place, and several Lodges were formed there before the Japanese invasion of the Second World War. A "Lodge" was opened in Changi POW Camp of which a history has been compiled by Bro Mick Walker RoH of the Grand Lodge of England.

Following the end of the Second World War, there was a Lodge formed by members of the Japan Occupation Forces. A Lodge was opened in Korea during the time of the Korean War, and was associated with the Cameron Highlanders. New Lodges were formed also in Singapore, one of which was the "Enterprise" Lodge GLE. Another Lodge was associated with a Royal Air Force Base.

From the mid-1950s Lodges spread across South East Asia due greatly to the influx of British servicemen as a result of increasing tensions in the region that culminated in the Malayan Emergency. By 1965 There were Lodges in Borneo, Singapore, Malaysia. Virtually all of these Lodges were "military" lodges and met at the various British Army Bases and Camps. One such lodge was Straits Commonwealth Lodge.

The Buffs continued to exist in South East Asia after the conflict. The Rumah Pantai Lodge GLE on Borneo was formed in 1980 by the merger of two old Military Lodges. Rumah Pantai soldiered on until 2015 by which time it was the last RAOB Lodge in Asia.

As of 2025, RAOB Philippines, The Royal Antediluvian Order of Buffaloes (RAOB), widely known as "The Buffs," is an international, non-Masonic fraternal, charitable, and community service organization that operates in the Philippines. Founded originally in London in 1822, the Philippine branch operates under the jurisdiction of the Grand Lodge of England (GLE) - Grand Lodge of Victoria. The first Minor Lodge in the Philippines, the Philippine Carabao Lodge No. 1, was officially established and consecrated on November 15, 2025. This historic event was supported by the Grand Lodge of Victoria GLE, led by Grand Primo David Mackay and Deputy Grand Primo Robert Mackay. During the consecration, Buff John Rupert Ibarra Corpuz C.P. was installed as the Worthy Primo, and Buff Mark Neil Limcuando C.P. was installed as the City Marshal, alongside 10 other lodge officers.

=== List of places where RAOB lodges existed ===
RAOB Lodges once existed in the following:

- Malta
- Cyprus
- Korea
- Japan
- Baluchistan between Afghanistan, Iran and India (now Pakistan)
- India
- Iraq
- Libya
- Egypt
- Aden
- Oman
- Israel
- Benghazi
- Jinja
- Kenya
- Accra Ghana
- Sierra Leone
- Tobruk
- Ceylon
- Nigeria
- Tripoli
- Gan
- India
- Malaya
- Hong Kong
- Singapore
- Borneo
- Papua New Guinea
- Philippines

Most of those Lodges, if not all, were associated with the British Armed Forces.

=== Today ===
The post Second World War years were undeniably a golden age for the Buffaloes. Worldwide membership increased and the number of Lodges expanded to reach their zenith in the 1960s-early 1970s. It was at this time too, in the post war period leading up to 1970, that the largest number of RAOB lodges in the Armed Forces came about.

As with many organisations dating from the pre-Victorian period, there has been a noticeable decline in membership since a boom in the 1970s. With the reduction in the size and scale of the British Armed Forces, and social changes as mentioned, the Buffaloes movement has shrunk in size, and a significant number of Lodges around the world have closed.

By 2012 Scotland's oldest lodge, the Royal Edinburgh Lodge No. 854, was down to 25 members.

The Grand Lodge of England remains the largest Buffalo Order, it now only has 700 or less active Lodges. Some of the most historic Lodges remain open such as Albion No 1 in Liverpool. There are Grand Lodges within the GLE system in operation in New Zealand, Australia, Canada, Cyprus, and Northern Ireland.

The Grand Lodge of England sold its two convalescent homes in 2014.

== South Africa ==
The earliest known Lodges were United No 1 and Anchor 631, both of the Grand Surrey Banner, set up in the 1880s.

In 1921, Several Lodges operating under the Grand Surrey Banner, Grand Surrey Lodge and Grand Lodge of England Limited seceded to the Grand Lodge of England (Birmingham section) taking up the numbers 4004–4016 on the Roll of the said Grand Lodge of England. In the same year, the Grand Lodge of England granted a Warrant for the formation of a Grand Lodge of South Africa and Rhodesia. This was inaugurated on the 21st of August 1921. The First Grand Primo being Bro. Lawrence Pascoe KoM.

One of the more notable members of the Order in South Africa was Bro.John Christie P.B. who was Leader of the South African Labour Party from 1946 to 1953.

== Australia ==
=== History ===
The earliest Buffalo Lodges were formed in Australia, in Sydney, the 1860s–1870s. A couple of articles appeared in various Buffalo Magazines in Australasia dealing of those early days.

Lodges spread all over Australia under a number of different Buffalo Orders: the Grand Surrey Lodge, the Grand Surrey Banner, the Grand Lodge of England. There was also a Grand Marine Banner.

In 1902, Bro. J Ord-Hume was appointed as a Grand Lodge of England Travelling Commissioner, with the power to open Lodges in his travels abroad to Australia. Maritime Lodge was recorded as the first GLE Lodge in Australia.

In 1914, the Grand Surrey Banner, Grand Independent Banner, & Marine Banner of Australia merged to form the Grand Australasian Banner. This Order is unique in that it has a fifth degree, the Roll of Honour Chain Collar.

In the 1920s the first State Grand Lodges under the Grand Lodge of England were opened.

In the 1930s, George Vincent Ellery, the maternal father of Anthony Albanese admitted to being the 'Provincial Grand Primo of the Order of Buffaloes in Sydney' during a court case about his alleged involvement in counterfeit medicine production.

Around the time of the Second World War, Lodges were extended under the GLE and GAB to Papua and New Guinea (later Territory of Papua and New Guinea and independent Papua New Guinea).

In the 1950s a lodge was opened on the Peel Island leper colony.

In the early 1980s an attempt was made to form a GAB lodge in New Zealand. This was opposed by the Grand Council in New Zealand.

=== Present ===
Today the GLE has the Grand Lodge of Queensland, Grand Lodge of Victoria, Grand Lodge of New South Wales East, Grand Lodge New South Wales West, Grand Lodge of South Australia & Grand Lodge of Tasmania still exist, as does the Grand Australasian Banner in the following states - Grand Lodge of Victoria, Grand Lodge of Queensland (Minor Lodges in New South Wales report under QLD) & Grand Lodge of Tasmania.

In Australia, the order is nicknamed the "Boozy Buffs", probably due to the order historically meeting in pubs. However, some lodges and/or their members are teetotal.

== New Zealand ==
There have been around 400 Buffalo Lodges established in New Zealand in the period from the 1880s to 2000. As of May 2022, there remain at least 78 minor lodges in operation, spread across four orders. The Grand Lodge of New Zealand of the GLE with at least 60 minor lodges, the Grand Council with 14 minor lodges, and Progressive Lodge of New Zealand with five. Of these, the Grand Council and Progressive Lodge have no Lodges outside of the North Island.

=== Grand Surrey Lodges in Canterbury ===
The earliest surviving references to Buffalo Lodges operating in New Zealand are to be found in a now rare out of print book. The History of Lyttleton Lodge No 8, by Bro. James Tihema RoH. Tihema delves into the subject of the early Lodges in Canterbury, of the Lodges established under the Grand Surrey Lodge in the 1880s. There was a Grand Lodge of New Zealand formed, under the Grand Surrey Lodge. There were at least 6 Minor Lodges formed in the Canterbury Region including the masonic sounding "Royal Arch of Friendship Lodge" opened in Ashburton, and the "Royal Lyttleton Lodge No 756".

According to old New Zealand Buffalo Review reports from Lyttleton Lodge No 8, the present day Lyttleton Lodge No 8 was formed in the early 1920s from the merger of the old Grand Surrey Lodge in Canterbury with the new emerging Grand Lodge of England movement. Lyttleton Lodge is often referred to in the old RAOB GLNZ Journals as Lyttleton 6461 just as Ye Petitor would often report under the Name and Number Ye Petitor 2674.

=== Grand Surrey Banner in Wellington ===
In Petone Wellington in 1916, Bro Earnest Lacy RoH led the formation of the first Lodge in Wellington, established under the Grand Surrey Banner. It was called Tuatahi Lodge no 2041 GSB, Tuatahi being Maori for "One" or "First". From this Lodge was begun a short lived Grand New Zealand Banner.

=== Grand Lodge of New Zealand GLE ===
At the end of the First World War soldiers in the Torquay Demobilization Camp formed the Ye Petitor Lodge No 2674. A GLE dispensation was granted to the lodge in 1919. The lodge was then transported to Christchurch, New Zealand. In 1922, at the formation of the Grand Lodge of New Zealand, Ye Petitor 2674 became No 1 on the Roll of the Grand Lodge of New Zealand of GLE. It was not the only GLE lodge to be formed in New Zealand prior to 1922. Other Lodges included Auckland City Lodge in Auckland.

Attempts to establish a Grand Lodge of New Zealand of GLE are known to have begun in 1920. The first recorded meetings of the Grand Lodge of New Zealand of GLE were in Christchurch in February 1922. On Sunday 19 March 1922 the First Grand Lodge was elected with Bro. W.G Brooks RoH being the first Grand Primo of the Grand Lodge of New Zealand of GLE Edwin Clark in his history of the Grand Lodge of New Zealand states, based on original minutes, that a motion was passed for the Grand Lodge Dispensation to be framed.

According to the original minutes as mentioned by Edwin Clark in his history of the first 25 years of Grand Lodge, the meetings of the new Grand Lodge were to be held at 8pm, on the last Thursday of each month.

Lodges formed under The Grand Lodge of New Zealand of GLE would continue to have an English GLE Number issued to them until at least as late as 1930.

Grand Lodge of England Granted the Grand Lodge of New Zealand its independence around 1931. It is still in fraternal accord with the GLE and is part of the GLE banner, but is independent of the Grand Lodge of England.

=== Grand Primos of the Grand Lodge of New Zealand GLE ===
1. Bro. W.G. Brooks RoH 1922
2. Bro. A.B.Simpson KOM 1923
3. Bro. W Pennington KOM 1924
4. Bro. C W Jones KOM 1925
5. Bro. A J Smith 1925–1926
6. Bro. A.D.Pickard 1926–1927
7. Bro G.A.Denning RoH 1927/1928
8. Bro. W.Drain K.O.M 1928/1929
9. Bro.W.W.M.Watt R.O.H 1929/1930
10. Bro.W.J.W.Neate RoH 1930/1931

=== Lodges of the GLNZ ===
The first 32 Lodges under the Grand Lodge of New Zealand of GLE
Lodge	GLNZ Number	GLE Number	Date Opened	Location	Notes	Status
Ye Petitor	01	2674	1919	Torquay	Opened Christchurch 1920	Still operating, 2022, in Christchurch
Auckland City	02	3438	6/1921	Auckland		Closed
Dominion Road	03	3439	6/1921	Auckland		Closed
Sir E E Lacy	03	3439	6/1922	Auckland		Closed
Sydenham	04	3440		Christchurch		Still in operation 2022
Lord Alverston	05	3441	1922	Auckland		Closed
Nulli Secundus	06	3442	1923	Auckland		Closed
Ye Mt Egmont	07	3443	09/1923	New Plymouth		Closed
Lyttleton (6461)	08	4429	1923	Lyttleton Christchurch		Still in operation 2022
Dunedin City	09	4430	1923	Dunedin		Still in operation 2022
Manukau Road	10	4425	1923	Auckland		Closed
Hinemoa	11	4426	1923	Hamilton		Still in operation 2022
Birkenhead	12	4427	1923	Birkenhead North Shore		Closed
Richmond	13	4428	1923	Auckland		Closed
Riccarton	14			Christchurch		Closed
Devonport	15		Sept 1924	Devonport Auckland		Still in operation 2022
Renown	16	4643	1924	Dunedin		Now Mornington, Renown, Tui 132
Royal Athenic	17	4644	1924	Port Chalmers, Dunedin	Formerly GEB No 2	Closed
New Brighton	18	4645	1924	New Brigthton, Christchurch		Closed
Tuarua	19			Wellington		Closed
Tuatoru	20			Wellington		Closed
Progress	21			Wellington		Still open March 2022
Haeremai	22			Wellington		Closed
Sir William Parkinson	23			Wellington		Closed
Sir A d Pickard	24			Wellington		Closed
Wakatu	25			Nelson		Closed
Fergusson	26			Palmerston North		Closed
Rona	27			Wellington		Closed
Kia Ora	28			Wellington		In Recess
Mt Rochfort	29	4656		Denniston		Closed
Tui	30			Dunedin		Now Mornington Renown Tui 132
Frankton Junction	31			Frankton Junction, Hamilton		Closed
Diomede	32			HMS Diomede	Transferred to HMNZS Achilles	Closed 1948

=== West Coast South Island ===
The first Buffalo Lodge to be formed on the West Coast of New Zealand's South Island was the Mt Rochfort Lodge No 29 located at Denniston, New Zealand, opened in 1924. Its English number was 4656. The founder was a Bro. James Henry Insull RoH. He was originally from Abistillery, South Wales and came to Denniston in 1923. Other key members of Mt Rochfort Lodge in the early years was Bro. Harry Pearson, Bro Thomas J Thomas and Bro James Smalley.

Other Lodges followed. Kowhai No 40 in Westport, Prosperity 62 in Fairdown, Harbour Lodge 73 in Greymouth, Runanga 74 in Dunollie, Blackball No 80 in Blackball.

One member well known was Bro. Storey Worgan RoH. He was born on Denniston in 1899. For many years he was very active in the Runanga Lodge No 74, and eventually serve as Provincial Grand Primo of the West Coast.

In 1943 Bro. James Henry Insull RoH was elected Grand Primo of New Zealand.

The Mt Rochfort Lodge lasted until the 1960s, its regular meeting place being the RSA hall in Denniston. One of the members to join in 1962 was the publican and miner Johnny Cotter. The years since 1962, saw the lodge relocated to Waimangaroa, where it purchased its own hall. From the late 1970s there was a membership decline in Mt Rochfort Lodge greatly owing to changing fortunes on the coast. The Mt Rochfort Lodge No 29 laboured on until it closed in 1997, the then Secretary signing off with the words "Closed in Sorrow".

The West Coast is now a remote area under the Grand Lodge of New Zealand. The most recent Grand Primo being a Bro. More RoH LM.

=== Māori Grand Primos of GLNZ ===
The first Māori Provincial Grand Primo was Bro. Tai Tuhimata KoM, who was installed as Provincial Grand Primo of Auckland for 1958–1959.

Māori grand primos of the GLNZ include:

- Bro.Tiki Marsden RoH: Northern Bay of Plenty 1984
- Bro T Glover RoH: Gisborne East Coast
- Bro Brian Wilson RoH: Egmont Taranaki 2005
- Bro Anzac Te Maro RoH: Wellington 2006
- Bro Joe Cross C.P: Northland 2012
- Bro.M Te Tai K.O.M: Nelson 2017

=== Grand Council in New Zealand ===
The Grand Council came about as a result of the amalgamation in Great Britain, of the Grand Surrey Banner and a number of smaller Buffalo Orders in the period 1925–26. As a result, all Lodges formerly under the Grand Surrey Banner became Grand Council Lodges. By that stage, there existed a Colonial Grand Lodge based in Auckland, that oversaw the Grand Surrey Banner Lodges in New Zealand. On the formation of the Grand Council, local numbers were permitted for use in numbering the Grand Council Lodges in New Zealand.

The first Grand Surrey Banner Lodge in New Zealand for which there exists some evidence, was Tuatahi Lodge 2041 in Petone. Opened in 1916. From surviving evidence, it had gone into its own banner by 1920 and as such, ceased to exist under the Grand Surrey Banner. The Members would return to the Grand Surrey Banner/Grand Council later, when the Grand New Zealand Banner collapsed.

In 1922 the Lord Jellicoe Lodge No 3010 G.S.B. was opened in Devonport Auckland by Naval Brothers. Under Grand Council, it would become Lord Jellicoe (NZ) No 1. Also in 1922, under the Grand Surrey Banner, the Chatham Lodge3037 GSB on HMS Chatham was opened. This Lodge became NZ No 2 of Grand Council.

The Past Present and Future Lodge No 3038 Grand Surrey Banner was opened in September 1922 in the Queens Hall, Paget Street, Ponsonby in Auckland. Early members include a Bro Charles Reeves, Bro H Bonsey, Primo Rye and Bro. Hopkins. As of May 2022 the Lodge is still in operation, now in Avondale, in Auckland. It is the oldest Buffalo Lodge in the North Island of New Zealand.

In both 1922-23 the Grand Surrey Banner Lodges in New Zealand were controlled from Great Britain. In 1924, a Colonial Grand Lodge was formed, with local Grand Presidents and Grand Officers.

In 1947 the New Zealand Sub Council of Grand Council was granted charter from the Grand Council in England. The First Grand President of New Zealand Sub Council was Bro. Charles Coggins RoH, a locomotive engineer on the New Zealand Government Railways, who was later killed in the Kaukapakapa railway accident in 1952. In 1955, a lodge was opened in Auckland, in honour of Charles Coggins, founder members included Bro John Hurt RoH and Bro Fulljames.

During the 1950s the New Zealand Sub Council of Grand Council continued the trend of expanding membership.

A Quinquennial Conference was held by the New Zealand Sub Council in 1957, in which a commemorative booklet was produced.

In the 1950s a landmark decision was made by the Grand Council of England against the New Zealand Sub Council regarding the admittance of Māori as members. The Upper Valley Grand Lodge, a Governing Authority overseeing the Grand Council Lodges in the Wairarapa, fought to have the ban on Māori lifted. The New Zealand Sub Council were reluctant to do this, citing the excuse they had Lodges in the dry area of the King Country and there was concern that as the lodges served alcohol that Māori could not join, owing to a long-standing agreement that existed between the Kingitanga and Government. Grand Council England considered the matter, after the Upper Valley Grand Lodge wrote to GC in the United Kingdom to seek a ruling. Grand Council decided that the refusal by the New Zealand Sub Council to admit Māori as members was thoroughly inconstant with the principles of the Order and Sub Council were forced to comply with the decision of Grand Council. It was pointed out that "Māori were British Subjects", that "the policy of racial exclusion could not be justified because Māori brothers from the GLNZ GLE could attend Sub Council Lodges as visitor" and that by refusing to initiate Māori GC was missing out and GLE was gaining. New Zealand Sub Council thus was forced changed its policy and many brothers have joined since then. One such Māori brother to have joined and who rose through the ranks, was Bro. Percy Maniopoto RoH LM who become Grand President of New Zealand Sub Council in 1996.

By the end of the decade of the 1950s New Zealand Sub Council had meeting registrations in the thousands but this would not last long. In the 1970s registrations began to decline, a situation that has continued to the present day, except for the Progressive Lodge of New Zealand.

=== Lodges of Grand Council in New Zealand ===
Since 1922, a total of 95 Grand Council Lodges have been opened in New Zealand. Apart from Chatham Lodge, the Grand Council has only ever been North Island based with no lodges to date in the South Island. As of May 2022, there remain 14 Grand Council Minor Lodges in New Zealand.

The First 16 GC Lodges in New Zealand
Lodge	GCNZ Number	GSB Number	Date Opened	Location	Notes	Status
Lord Jellicoe	01	3010	1922	Devonport, Auckland		Closed 1949
Chatham	02	3037	1922	HMS Chatham	Transferred to HMS Dunedin 1924	Closed 1927
Past, Present Future	03	3038	September 1922	Ponsonby, Auckland		Still open in Avondale May 2022. Original Dispensation destroyed in fire, replacement issued 1969
Tuatahi	04		1922		Wellington	Closed
Dominion	05		1924		Auckland	Closed 2018
Kia Ora	06		1924			Merged Dominion 5 1932
Fort Niger	07		1924		New Plymouth, Taranaki	Closed 1926
Tamaki	08		1924	St Heliers, Auckland		Closed 1928
Gog and Magog	09		1924	Auckland		Merged with Dominion 5 1932
Railway	10		1925		Otahuhu, Auckland	Closed 1933
Diggers	11		1925	Trentham Odd Fellows Hall, Hutt Valley		Closed 1943
Taumarunui	12		26 June 1926	Taumarunui, King Country	In Recess 1932–1938	Closed 2018
Wellington	13			Wellington		Closed 1968
Waitomo	14		1928	Te Kuiti, King Country		Closed 1969
Toheroa	15		1931	Dargaville, Hokianga		Closed 1983
Huia	16		1934	Otorohonga, King Country		Closed 2010. Re-opened at Paengaroa Bay of Plenty 2014

=== Grand Executive Banner ===
The Grand Executive Banner (GEB) was another Buffalo Order to have come out of Great Britain in the early 1920s. GEB were first formed in New Zealand, in Dunedin around 1920. The first Lodge was Otago GEB No 1. A second Lodge formed was the Royal Athenic Lodge in Port Chalmers, also under the Grand Executive Banner. Royal Athenic would later shift allegiance to the Grand Lodge of New Zealand of the Grand Lodge of England.

Other GEB Lodges were formed around New Zealand, up to 7 GEB Lodges, including Waitemata in Devonport. There were thus 4 Buffalo Orders operating in Devonport, at the time, Making Devonport the town with more buffalo orders in it then at any other time or place in New Zealand history.

The Grand Executive Banner established a Zealandia Council and Executive. GEB had a good relationship with the Naval Lodge Chatham No 2 of the Grand Council. Eventually the Chatham members separated from Grand Council and formed a GEB lodge aboard HMS Dunedin.

In or around 1927 GEB fell out of favour with both the Grand Council and the Grand Lodge of New Zealand and was forbidden from any fraternal connections. This included being barred from any usage or interaction with the New Zealand Buffalo Recorder. Whilst the GEB thus disappeared off the main Buffalo radar in New Zealand, a report in a copy of the New Zealand Buffalo Review referred to a Brother attending a Lodge on the West Coast of the South Island as having represented the GEB Pacific Lodge.

=== Grand New Zealand Banner ===
A short-lived attempt to establish a New Zealand Buffalo Order. At least seven lodges were formed under the Grand New Zealand Banner, with one of these being located in Devonport, the Order was disbanded in the mid-1920s, on account of having no legitimate connection to an English Order.

=== Floating Dispensation Lodges ===
There have been a number of Floating Dispensation or moveable lodges operating in New Zealand. Established under the Grand Surrey Banner, Grand Council, the GLNZ GLE and the Grand Executive Banner.

- The Chatham Lodge No 2 Grand Council
- The Diomede Lodge No 32 Grand Lodge of New Zealand of GLE
- The G.E.B Lodge set up on HMS Dunedin in 1926. Name not known. Only known by references in old Buffalo Reviews.
- Monowai Lodge No 139 Grand Lodge of New South Wales East
- Our Navy Lodge No 184 Grand Lodge of New Zealand of GLE

=== Notable Buffaloes ===
The following notable individuals were members of the RAOB in New Zealand:

- Bro Robert Black, of the Dunedin Lodge, served as Mayor of Dunedin from 1929 to 1933
- Clive Hulme VC. Father of racing legend Denny Hulme, awarded the Victoria Cross. He was a Member of the Mountbatten Lodge in Pongakawa in the Bay of Plenty in the 1960s.
- Bro Bill Rowling KoM. Initiated Nikau Lodge 117 GLNZ GLE in Northland in the 1950s and was an active member for many years up until the 1980s. He would later get into politics and serve as deputy prime minister to Norman Kirk in the Third Labour Government, followed by a time as prime minister from 1974 to 1975.
- Bro Sir Basil Arthur from Timaru. Member of the Timaru Lodge under GLNZ GLE. Sir Basil was elected to Parliament as a Labour Party candidate. He later served as Speaker of the House of Representatives.

=== Waiheke Island ===
The Harbour Lights Lodge NZ No 72 of Grand Council was opened in 1957 on Waiheke Island. It was opened by the Grand Primo of Auckland Grand Lodge GC, Bro Tom Lane KoM. Among those present at the opening were Bro Stinger Martin and Bro.Les Foster KoM. In the early years the Lodge met in Palm Beach Hall, which had been built by a Brother buff and was intended for the Buffs and Local community to use. Eventually, the Buffs raised the funds and built their own lodge hall out of an old army hut from the Stoney Batter Base. The men's Lodge was later joined by a lady's lodge as well. In the later days of the Harbour Lights Lodge, one of the key members was Rod Murray, well known on Waiheke Island for Jaguar Tours. Rod provided transport for the members to and from lodge meetings.

=== Ladies Orders ===
The Loyal Elizabethan Order of Bisons was established in 1952 as an order for the Wives of Buffalo Lodge Members. It is unclear how many Lodges of that Order remain.

The Loyal Order of the Mystic Star was begun in Otahuhu in the late 1950s, originating out of the Otahuhu Ladies Social Club. The Order was intended for the wives, and partners of Grand Council Buffalo Lodge members. The foundations for the movement were laid by Chas Burnet RoH and David Glen KOM both members of the Otahuhu Lodge No 36 of Grand Council (opened 1949). To date the LOMS have opened 16 Lodges, of which only three remain in operation as well as a Grand Lodge.

=== Youth Orders ===
The Royal Order of the White Buffalo (ROWB) is the official youth wing of the RAOB fraternity in the Philippines, founded in 2026 and specifically created for young men aged 15 to 18. Its primary purpose is to build leadership, discipline, and honor in young men through direct mentorship from adult fraternity members. Instead of just classroom learning, the youth actively participate in community service, helping with feeding programs, medical missions, and school clean-up drives. Ultimately, the order serves as a preparatory ground, molding civic-minded teenagers and guiding them toward joining the adult lodge once they turn 18 The foundations for the movement were laid by PGP John Rupert Ibarra Corpuz CP and GP Robert Mackay KOM both members under the Grand Lodge of Victoria GLE.

=== Progressive Lodge of New Zealand ===
In June 2016, two lodges of the GLNZ formed their own order, the Progressive Lodge of New Zealand (PLNZ), owing to dissatisfaction with GLNZ and the RAOB Trust. Three other lodges, Kiwi, Jubilee and Mangamuka-Kaitaia Combined have joined PLNZ. PLNZ emphasises philanthropy and fraternity, while minimising ceremony and administration. PLNZ states that its order continues to grow, along with its philanthropic efforts.

In 2024, claims brought by the GLNZ and RAOB Trust against Progressive Lodge and Buffs Charitable Trust were thrown out in court. The GLNZ claimed that the Progressive Lodge had converted certain items that they claimed under GLNZ's rules should be returned to GLNZ. Earlier, the GLNZ and RAOB Trust had to state that they had no claim to the real estate owned by the Buffs Charitable Trust. The ruling effectively gave the Progressive Lodge legitimacy as an RAOB banner in law.

=== Royal Antediluvian Order of Buffaloes Trust Board ===
On 22 October 1966 the Parliament of New Zealand enacted the Royal Antediluvian Order of Buffaloes Trust Act 1966, a Private Act. The Act created the Royal Antediluvian Order of Buffaloes Trust Board for GLNZ lodges that had closed, so that their properties could be held in the trust. As a statutory entity, the Trust is not a registered charitable trust. In 2021, two of the lodges of the Progressive Lodge of New Zealand formed their own charitable trust, the Buffs Charitable Trust. The accounts of this trust are available for all members of the public to see.

=== Present ===
The four Banners that make up the movement within New Zealand, cover most parts of the country with Lodges stretching from the Bay of Islands to Southland. There are 78 RAOB lodges in New Zealand, 58 under the Grand Lodge of New Zealand of GLE, 14 under the Grand Council, 5 under the Progressive Lodge of New Zealand, and 1 under the Grand Lodge of Aotearoa. These provide a reasonable coverage, owing to closure of lodges in the last 30 years, Timaru, Oamaru and Nelson are major towns now without a Lodge.
