= Demid =

Russian masculine given name

Demid (Russian: Демид) is a Russian masculine given name, derived from Greek Greek: Διομήδης, Diomedes. Demid is a layman variant of the name, whereas the canonical form according to the Russian Orthodox Church is Diomid. The patronymic surnames Demidov, Demidovich, Demidenko are derived from it. Notable people with the name include:

- Demid Antufiev, father of Nikita Demidov (1656–1725), Russian businessman
- Demid Ilyich Kulikalov, 19th-century administrator of Russian America
- Demid Pyanda, 17th-century Russian explorer of Siberia

== See also ==
- Gelegdorjiin Demid, Mongolian politician and military commander
- Diomede
