= Barbara Hofland =

English writer

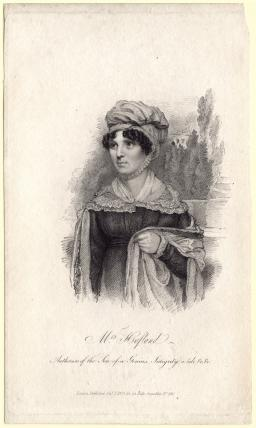

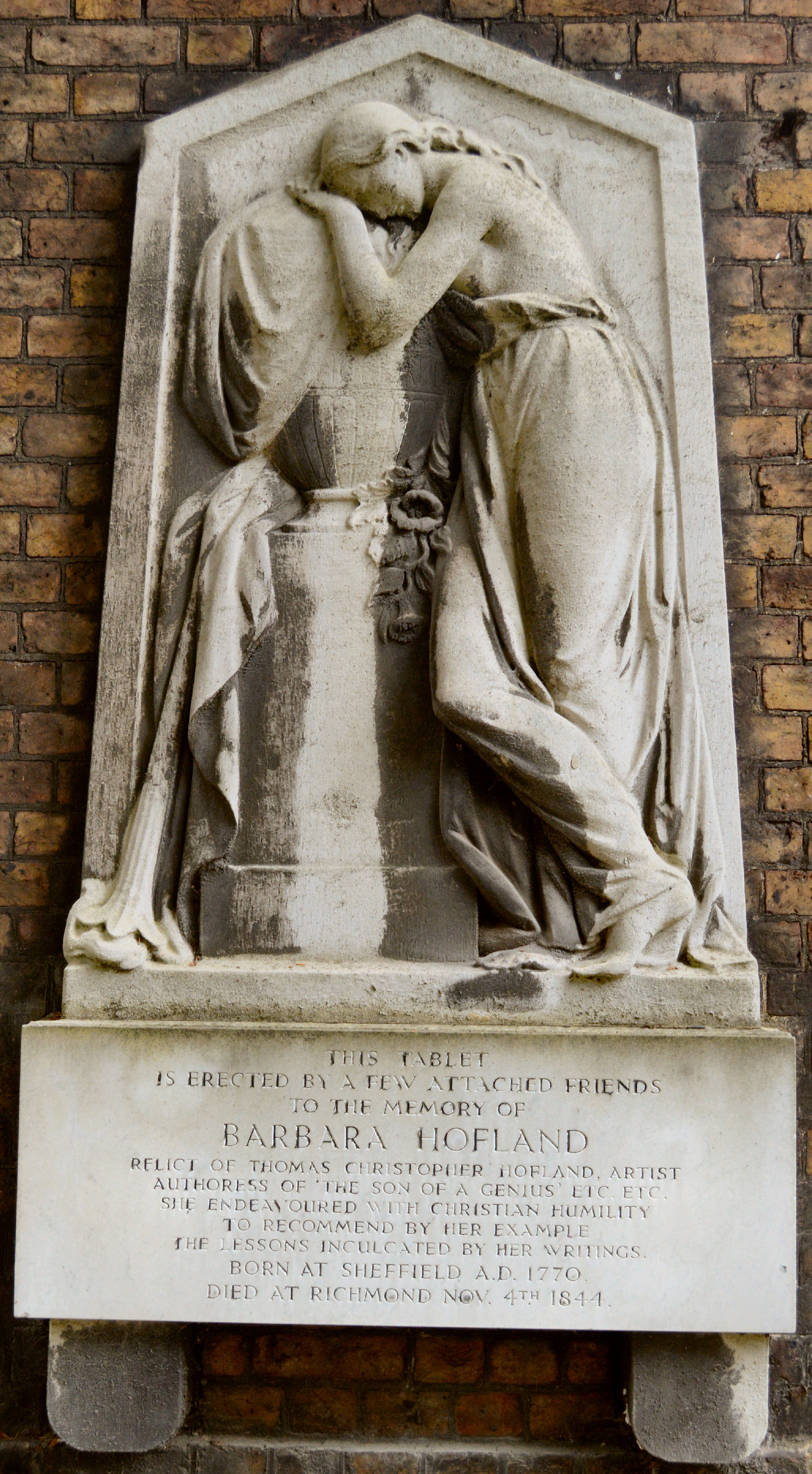

Barbara Hofland (1770 – 4 November 1844) was an English writer of some 66 didactic, moral stories for children, and of schoolbooks and poetry. She was asked by John Soane to write a description of his still extant museum in London's Lincoln's Inn Fields.

== Life ==
Born Barbara Wreaks or Wreakes, her father Robert Wreakes was a Sheffield manufacturer, but he died when she was three and she was raised by a maiden aunt in Dinnington, where she was briefly educated at the village's dame school. She began writing for the local paper and started a milliner's shop, but she sold it when she married the businessman Thomas Bradshawe Hoole in 1796, only to be widowed two years later with an infant son.

She went to live with her mother-in-law in Attercliffe, and supported herself partly from generous subscriptions given for a book of her poetry. In 1809 she opened a girls' boarding school at Grove House, Harrogate and developed it as a ladies' finishing school, a forerunner to what is now Harrogate College, but she kept it only until 1811, when she moved to London.

In 1810, Barbara Wreaks married the landscape artist Thomas Christopher Hofland (1777–1843). Although her new husband had a good local reputation and had exhibited at the Royal Academy, his wife's writings were to remain the main source of family income. In 1816 she was living in Newman Street, north of Oxford Street, but they moved to Twickenham that year.

Her son Frederic, an Anglican priest, predeceased her in 1832, as did her husband in 1843. She died on 4 November 1844 and was buried at Richmond, Surrey. Her life by Thomas Ramsay was published in 1849.

== Writings ==
During her writing life, Hofland became a friend of the architect John Soane, who asked her to provide a description of his museum in Lincoln's Inn Fields, and of the writers Maria Edgeworth and Mary Russell Mitford. Her first story, The History of an Officer's Widow (1809), earned her £6 from John Harris, a London publisher. One of her many popular books (as Mrs. Hofland) was The Blind Farmer and His Children (1816). Her most popular children's book was The Son of a Genius, about an impulsive artist, which may contain autobiographical elements. It had been reprinted at least 14 times in England by 1841, as well as nine times in America, and in translations into French and other languages. Most of her works depict the struggles of a Christian family against hardships. Hofland's Tales of the Priory (1820), Tales of the Manor (1822) and Self-Denial (Pub in 1827) the 1835 edition can be read online, as can The Young Crusoe (1828), and a number of others. She also wrote geographical and topographical books for teaching purposes, and a longer work in verse: A Season at Harrogate (1812).

Hofland wrote a description and a poem on Whiteknights Park, the seat of the 5th Duke of Marlborough. The text, the drawings and etchings by her husband and the money they invested in publishing and printing were never reimbursed by the "profligate" duke.

== Selected works ==
- Book of poetry (1805)
- The History of an Officer's Widow (London, J. Harris, 1809)
- Little Dramas for Young People by Mrs. Hoole (1810)
- The Son of a Genius (London, J. Harris, 1812)
- Says She to her Neighbour, What? (London: Newman, 1812)
- The Daughter-in-Law (London: Newman, 1813)
- Patience and Perseverance (London: Newman, 1813)
- A Visit to London; or, Emily and Her Friends (London: Newman, 1814)
- The History of a Clergyman's Widow (London : Newman, 2nd e., 1814)
- The Merchant's Widow and her Family (London: Newman, 1814)
- A Father As He Should Be (London: Newman, 1815)
- The Maid of Moscow (London: Newman, 1816)
- Matilda (London: Newman, 1816)
- Tales of the Priory (London: Longman, 1820)
- Tales of the Manor (London: Longman, 1822)
- "The Daughter of a Genius" (Boston: Munroe & Francis, 1823)
- Integrity (London: Longman, 1823)
- Decision (London: Longman, 1824)
- Moderation (London: Longman, 1825)
- Reflection (London : Longman, 1826)
- Self-Denial (London: Longman, 1827)
- Katherine (London: Newman, 1828)
- The Young Crusoe (1828)
- Beatrice (London: Longman, 1829)
- The Captives in India (London: Bentley, 1834)
- White-Knights. A Poem called: "A Descriptive Account of the Mansion and Gardens of White-Knights, a Seat of His Grace the Duke of Marlborough"

== See also ==
- List of Minerva Press authors
- Minerva Press

== Literature ==
- Mary Soames; The Profligate Duke: George Spencer Churchill, Fifth Duke of Marlborough, and His Duchess (1987)
