= Grove House, Harrogate =

Listed former pub in North Yorkshire, England

Grove House
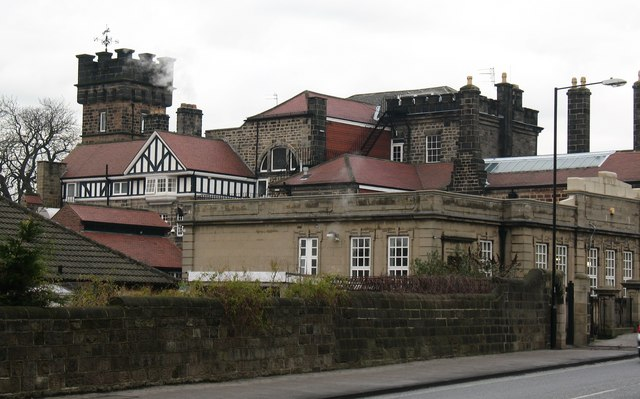
- Grove House, as pictured from the Skipton Road, Harrogate
- Former names: World's End Inn

General information
- Status: Converted into a care home
- Type: Inn (former; later a house)
- Location: Skipton Road, Harrogate, North Yorkshire, England
- Coordinates: 54.0018°N 1.5330°W
- Groundbreaking: 1745; 281 years ago
- Completed: 1754; 272 years ago
- Renovated: c. 1897–1902 (wings added)
- Owner: Springfield Healthcare

Design and construction
- Designations

Listed Building – Grade II*
- Official name: Grove House
- Designated: 4 February 1975
- Reference no.: 1149433

Website
- Official website

Grove House is a former inn, school, house and orphanage on Skipton Road in Harrogate, a spa town in North Yorkshire, England. Built between 1745 and 1754 as the World's End Inn, it was later greatly expanded as the home of the prominent inventor Samson Fox and became the first house in Yorkshire to be lit by water gas. It was sold in 2016 and is currently being converted into a care home by Springfield Healthcare. The building is Grade II* listed on the National Heritage List for England.

== World's End Inn: 1752–1850 ==
The earliest reference to the World's End Inn was in 1728, but the inn may date back earlier, when Harrogate was expanding as a spa town. The present building was originally constructed between 1752 and 1754 as a square-shaped hostelry around an inner quadrangle. There is evidence to suggest that it served as coaching inn and staging post, for passengers and mail from London to York.

In 1805, it was purchased by a Mrs. Holland for use as a boarding school. In 1809 it was purchased by Yorkshire-born author Barbara Hofland, who developed it as a ladies finishing school, a forerunner to what is now Harrogate Ladies' College. But she kept it only until 1811, when she moved to London. Purchased by the Reverend T. T. Wildsmith in 1822, he converted it into a school for boys. After being unoccupied for some years, it was converted to a private house by new owner, Captain Heneby.

== Grove House: 1850–1926 ==
In 1882, the house was bought by engineering inventor, Samson Fox. A self-made man, he had created the Leeds Forge Company, and through his invention of the corrugated flue, had made himself a multi-millionaire. His descendants include the actor Edward Fox, and his daughter the actress Emilia Fox.

Samson Fox built himself a fully equipped workshop in the basement, and added the Royal Stables, which included a Victorian Turkish bath for his breeding stock. The stables' clock tower, and much of the interior panelling, stained glass and plasterwork to create new rooms in the house, were all recovered from the recently demolished Dragon Hotel, formerly over a bridge on the opposite side of Skipton Road. Fox extended the estate footprint through purchases of land when they became available, eventually creating an estate just in excess of 40 acres (16 ha). This included the provision of grazing land for sheep by the gatehouse, so that they could rest on their way to Knaresborough market.

Experimenting after a trip to the United States, he refined the process for producing water gas in his basement laboratory, and began constructing a trial plant in the grounds of the property. This made Grove House the first house lit with water gas in the world. He later built the first of three new town-scale plants across the UK in Harrogate, creating a light so bright that it was written that: "Samson Fox has captured the sunlight for Harrogate."

This success allowed him in 1870 to add the west wing, designed to provide a suite of rooms for his friend the Prince of Wales (later King Edward VII), and his party when visiting Yorkshire, including: a library; billiard room; and small gallery. His commercial efforts to extend water gas production across the UK were blocked by the commercial and political efforts of the existing coal gas companies, plus an article written by consumer safety champion and fiction writer Jerome K. Jerome. This was released to the press and printed on the day that Fox formally presented the final cheque to the Prince of Wales, completing his full under writing of the £45,000 construction cost of the new home for the Royal College of Music.

Denied his knighthood, Fox funnelled his efforts into his new home town. He provided Harrogate with its first Fire Service, and built Grove Road School. After clearing his name from the water gas scare, he eventually became Mayor of Harrogate for three successive years, a feat never equalled since.

From 1898 to 1902, Fox built the east wing on the site of the former winter garden. It provided a music and ballroom, and an extensive art gallery on the first floor. During renovations in 1998/9, builders found a number of dragon-patterned ornate plaster panels above the music room, probably incorporated from the former Dragon Hotel, which were part of Fox's original renovations. Carefully removed, they now reside in Lesser Hall, the Grand Staircase and first floor landing. Those in the Lesser Hall alone have been valued in excess of £40,000 by the Royal Pump Room Museum.

After Fox's death on a visit to Walsall in 1903, his executors maintained the house and estate, retaining staff to keep the house clean and the gardens in order. During the First World War, like many great houses, Grove House became a convalescence hospital, used for troops from the Battle of the Somme and Battle of Flanders.

== RAOB Grove House: 1926–present ==
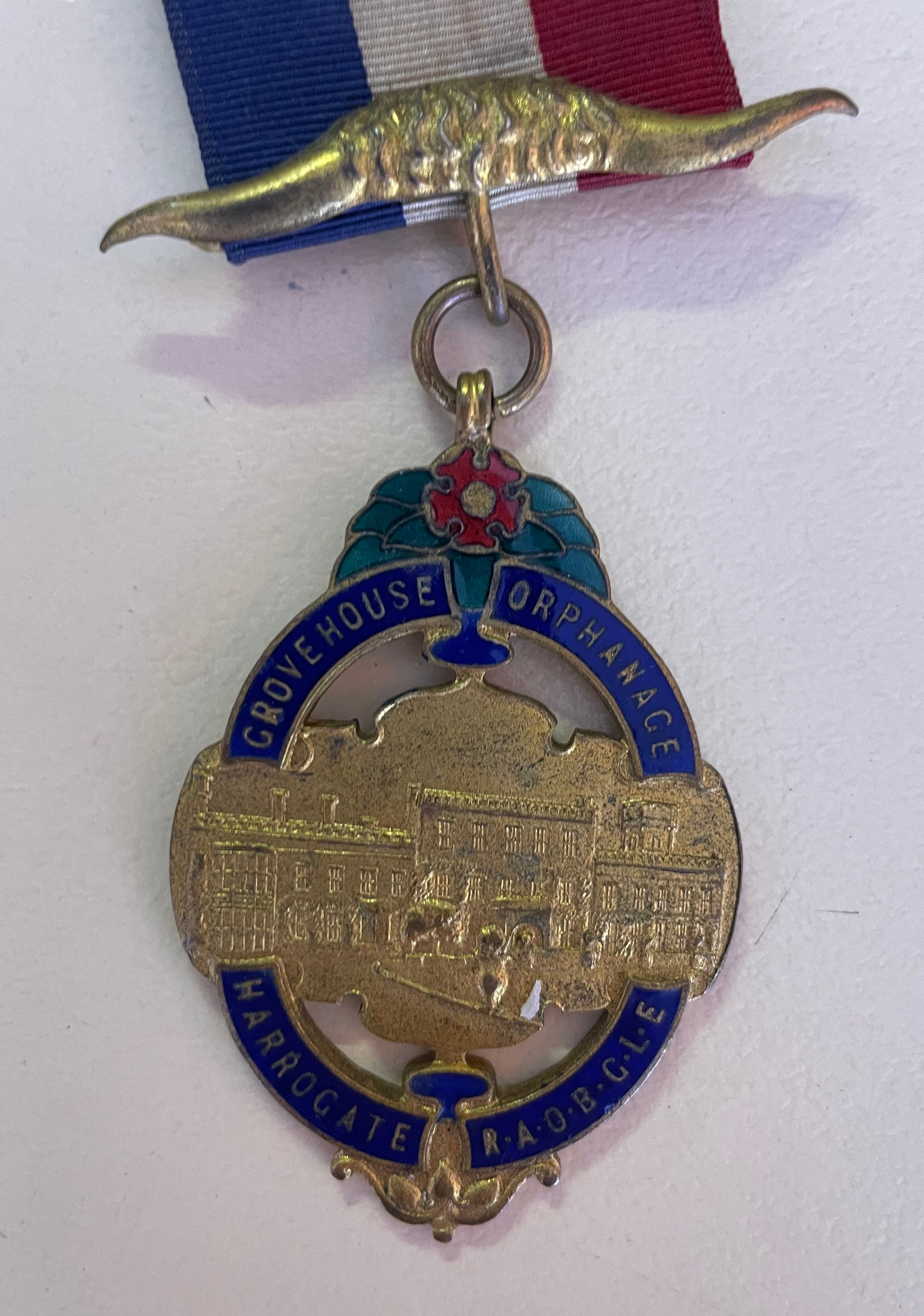
A jewel presented to an RAOB member who donated to the orphanage.

In 1926, the Royal Antediluvian Order of Buffaloes (RAOB) needed a new orphanage. Led by Lord Alston to raise funds to build and furnish a new orphanage, "Buffs" were urged to "buy a brick" or a yard of turf at a cost of one shilling, with each donor presented with a certificate.

RAOB agreed to purchase Grove House for £10,000 in 1926, which also facilitated the move of the Grand Lodge's offices from Sheffield. The orphanage opened during Easter 1927, with an opening march by donor members taking three hours to travel from Harrogate railway station, accompanied by four brass bands. During the Second World War, the orphanage continued in operation, as well as accommodating some British and United States Army units.

With the introduction of the national welfare state, the orphanage closed in 1947 and the RAOB returned the final resident children to members of their original families, together with supporting cash funds.

In 1966, to mark the centenary of the RAOB Grand Lodge of England, Grove House was adapted to provide permanent residential care for aged members without family or dependants. In 1980 female dependents of members were admitted as convalescent patients. In 1988 joint husband and wife convalescent patients were admitted for rest and recuperation, together with fee-paying holiday guests to help offset the costs of maintaining the premises.

The RAOB sold Grove House in December 2016. In 2023 it was reported that Springfield Healthcare was converting the property into a care home containing 24 flats. A new 62‑bed care home and eight houses would also be built on adjoining land, providing supported living for people aged over 65.

== See also ==
- Grade II* listed buildings in North Yorkshire (district)
