= Demidenko =

Demidenko is a Ukrainian-language patronymic surname derived from the given name Demid. Notable people with the surname include:

- Helen Demidenko
- Nikolai Demidenko
- Svetlana Demidenko
- Viktor Demidenko
