= University of Reading Herbarium =

Coordinates: 51°26′15.48″N 0°56′30.98″W

The University of Reading Herbarium (RNG) is a herbarium on the University of Reading's Whiteknights Campus.

Along with the Cole Museum, it forms part of the university's School of Biological Sciences, and is principally used for teaching and research purposes. The herbarium has over 400,000 specimens from around the world but has its most extensive collections from the Euromediterranean area, supplemented with special collections from the Falkland Islands and southern South America. The herbarium provides a research resource for some 50 staff and 500 students in Biological Sciences as well as providing material via loans to other registered herbaria.

== History ==
RNG was formed from the herbaria of the university's departments of Botany and Agricultural Botany (RU), and was founded in the late 1800s.
