= Diomid =

Diomid is a Russian masculine given name of Greek Origin: Greek: Διομήδης, Diomedes. 'Demid' is its layman version. Notable people with the name include:

- Diomid Dzyuban, a Russian Orthodox priest / monk
- Diomid Gherman
- George Blake, a British spy for the Soviet Union whose KGB code name was 'Diomid'

== See also ==
- Diomidis
