= Diomedes (disambiguation) =

Diomedes may refer to:

== Fiction and mythology ==
- Diomedes, a hero of the Trojan War and king of Argos in Greek mythology
- Diomedes of Thrace, king of Thrace in Greek mythology
- Mares of Diomedes, legendary man-eating horses
- There is a spurious tradition stating that Diomedes would have been the original name of Jason, before he was adopted by Chiron and received his new name.
- Captain Diomedes, a character in the video games Warhammer 40,000: Dawn of War II – Chaos Rising and Warhammer 40,000: Dawn of War II – Retribution

== Historical figures ==
- Diomedes Soter (first century BC), an Indo-Greek king
- Saint Diomedes of Tarsus (died c. 300), feast day August 16
- Saint Diomedes, feast day September 2
- Diomedes Grammaticus (4th century), a Latin grammarian
- Diomedes Cato (c. 1563 – c. 1618), a Polish-Italian composer
- Diomedes Maturan (c. 1940 – 2002), a Filipino actor
- Diomedes Komnenos (1956–1973), a Greek student and casualty of the Athens Polytechnic uprising
- Diomedes Díaz (1957–2013), a Colombian vallenato singer and composer

== Places ==
- Villa of Diomedes, Pompeii, Italy
- Diomede Islands, Russian and U.S. islands in the Bering Strait
- Diomede Bay, Vladivostok, Russia

== Other ==
- Diomedes, a taxonomic synonym for the plant genus Narcissus
- 1437 Diomedes, an asteroid

== See also ==
- Diomed, racehorse
- HMS Diomede, Royal Navy ships
- Diomidis
