= Thomas Christopher Hofland =

English painter

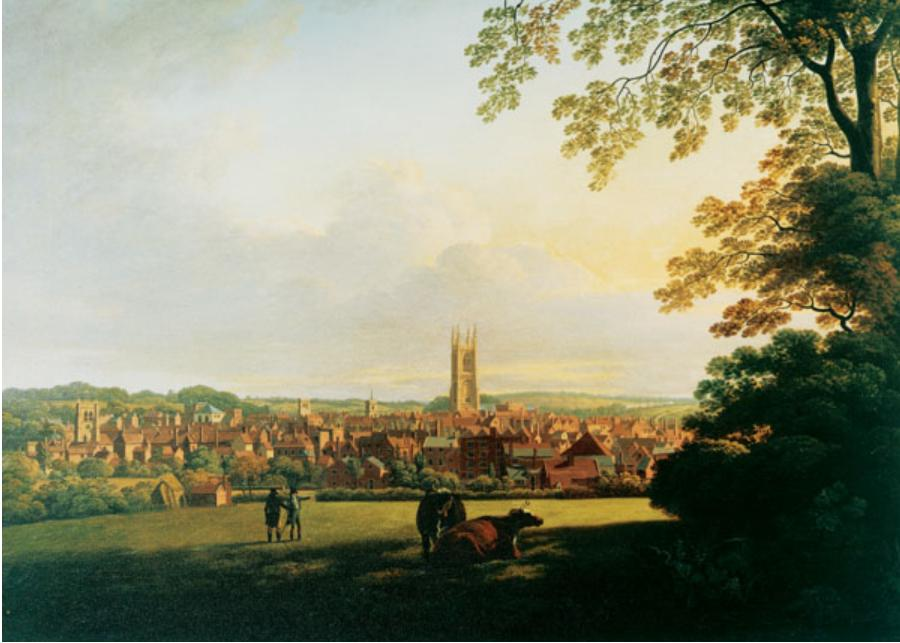
- Derby from a Field adjoining Abbey Barns by Hofland
- Born: 1777; Worksop
- Died: 1843 (aged 65–66); Leamington Spa
- Spouse: Barbara Hofland

Thomas Christopher Hofland RBA (1777–1843) was an English artist and teacher.

== Biography ==
Hofland was born in Worksop and he became a student of John Rathbone. He started teaching at Kew and moved to Derby in 1805, where he worked until 1808. He became the second husband of the successful writer Barbara Hofland in 1810. Hofland exhibited 72 paintings at the Royal Academy but the main source of their income was his wife's writing. He was a founder member of the Society of British Artists where he exhibited over 100 paintings. It was said that he helped found the Society, because he had not been made a member of the Royal Academy. In 1819 Hofland illustrated a book written by his wife about the Duke of Marlborough's house.

Hofland was a keen angler which he would combine with his skill for landscape painting.

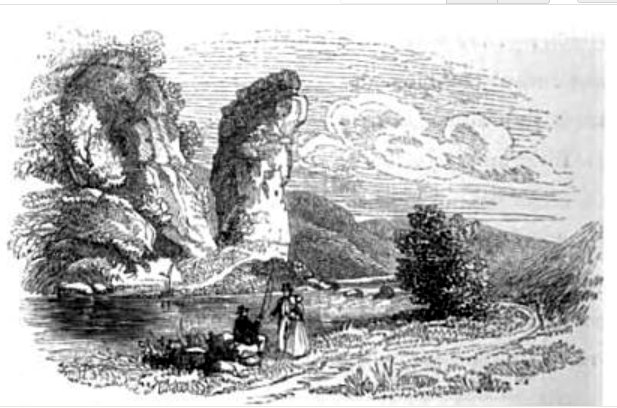
Fishing scene at Dovedale by Hofland

In 1839, whilst living beside the Thames, he published a book entitled "The British angler's manual" which set out to describe and advice about all aspects of fly-fishing, angling and trolling. Hofland said that he had spent a long time preparing this book as he had practised his fishing whilst landscape painting. Hofland's book concentrated particularly on trout fishing and is lavishly illustrated with his own paintings and drawings which were engraved by W.R.Smith.

Hofland's book describes various counties but Hampshire and Derbyshire are selected for special mention. He lists the rivers of Derbyshire, covering the Erwash (sic) in a few sentences. The River Dove (that inspired Isaac Walton's famous book) and then page after page of Dovedale where he had spent many days sketching and angling in the company of fellow artists like Ebenezer Rhodes from Sheffield.

The gardens of the Whiteknights estate were described in a book by Barbara Hofland with engraved pictures of the gardens and its multitude of bridges, fountains, seats and grottoes by Thomas Christopher Hofland. The book was ordered by the then Marquess of Blandford, later the 5th Duke of Marlborough, but like many other items that he ordered or purchased, it was never paid for.

Three years before he died he finally visited Italy. Hofland died of cancer in Leamington Spa.

== Legacy ==
Hofland's paintings and resulting engravings are in the Governments Art Collection and in museums or galleries at the University of Reading, Portsmouth, Derby and Sheffield.

Hofland's painting Moonlight inspired a poem of Letitia Elizabeth Landon published in The Literary Gazette (1824).

== Publications ==
- A descriptive account of the mansion and gardens of White-Knights: a seat of His Grace the Duke of Marlborough. By Mrs. Hofland. Illustrated with twenty-three engravings, from pictures taken on the spot by T.C. Hofland 1819
