= University of Reading Atmospheric Observatory =

Atmospheric observatory and weather station in Reading, Berkshire, England

Coordinates: 51.442°N 0.938°W

The University of Reading Atmospheric Observatory, is an atmospheric observatory and weather station located on the Whiteknights Campus of the University of Reading. It forms part of the university's Department of Meteorology. The site at its current location has been a centre for atmospheric research since 1970, but the weather record was originally started by the University College of Reading (a precursor of the university) in 1901 at the London Road campus as a rainfall station with a near complete daily record from January 1908. Automatic meteorological observations are continually recorded at the site and available online

== History ==
The first full meteorological observations from Reading were published in the Monthly Weather Report of the Meteorological Office in 1904. The site was at London Road on the best available position at the time, the Library Lawn. Records of barometric pressure, dry bulb, wet bulb, maximum and minimum temperatures, rainfall, cloud amount and form, wind direction and force and weather, both at time of observation and generally throughout the day were kept; the original notebooks are available from about 1910. Earth temperatures at 1 foot and 2 feet (later 4 feet) below the surface were also being made and grass minimum temperatures were added. Sunshine records started in 1956 when a Campbell Stokes sunshine recorder was put on the parapet of the Agricultural Botany building.

The station was upgraded in the 1960s and the number of instruments increased, including a bare soil minimum thermometer, a cup counter anemometer and a Casella siphon rainfall recorder. A new Meteorological Site came into operation on January 1, 1968, located on the main University campus between the University boiler house and Wilderness Wood. New instruments were added including a ground level rain gauge and an inline Munro wind direction and speed recorder, the head of which was mounted on a 50 foot lattice tower and the recorder in a special hut near the Meteorological Enclosure. For a while sunshine records continued to be kept at the London Road site, but an excellent position was found on the roof of the new Chemistry Department building at Whiteknights, thanks to the help and enthusiasm of Professor Fowles, the then Head of Department.

In 1969-70, due to the proposed development of the Wilderness Road site, a new Meteorological Enclosure had to be found. Late in 1969 a site was found on land east of the Whiteknights Lakes and adjoining Bridges Hall. A quick changeover took place to the new enclosure for records to start, unbroken, on January 1, 1970. Due to difficulties with the re-erection of the wind tower, it was some months before the Munro wind direction and speed measurements moved to the site's final location. The site was managed by various University departments, but was taken over by the Department of Meteorology in 1987, and merged with their small research site, established in the early 1970s. From 2008 the site became known as the Reading University Atmospheric Observatory, reflecting its wider range of uses at a time when new university development plans threatened its existence.

=== Staff ===
The earliest known meteorological observer was Mr James S Burgess, a technician in the Physics Department from 1918 until his retirement early in 1960. In 1955 he received a special Meteorological Office award for long service recording.

Following Burgess's retirement, records briefly ceased (this gap was later filled with data from the Meteorological Office and Sutton's Seed Trial Grounds), until the role was filled in May 1960 by Mr Arthur E Moon, retiring in 1977. At that point George Goodhind took over, who was employed by the Geography Department. Goodhind continued as Meteorological Observer until retirement in 1985, replaced by Ken Spiers who had joined the Geography Department in May 1982 as an assistant observer, moving to the Department of Meteorology as Meteorological Technician in 1987. Spiers retired in 2009 and was replaced by Mike Stroud, who retired in 2018. The site is now managed by the University's Technical Services.

== Current use for research and teaching ==
Following the merger of the Meteorology Department's research site and the weather station in 1987, the site has been used since the 1990s for both research and teaching. In the early 1990s, a recording system based on Campbell data loggers was implemented for air temperature and surface fluxes. A display was provided in an entrance corridor of the Meteorology Department's old building, TOB2. This was known as CAWS (Corridor Automatic Weather Station). Some of the data obtained was also used for teaching in an ad hoc way. A more extensive and permanent system (CORRDISP, for Corridor display) was developed in 1996, with the entire site re-cabled and standardised connections implemented. A particular feature was the use of a radio clock receiving the long wave time signals from Rugby to provide time synchronisation for the measurements, which also ensured that the data receiving computer listened at the right time for the data transmissions from the field site computer, multi-tasking options being almost impossible to implement at that stage. The connection to the main Department building was implemented by both cable and VHF radio data links, the latter intended to prepare for the move of the Department to a new site in 1997. Ultimately, however, as part of work to prepare the campus for the new Meteorology Building, a trench was dug between the site and the building, carrying a set of cables and an optical fibre. CORRDISP provided five minute averages of weather observations displayed on a screen in the department foyer and online from 1996, one of the first sites to present data in this way.

As well as the public data, the Observatory continues to provide micrometeorological data for practical classes and student research projects disseminated through an internal computer network, and high temporal resolution measurements of synoptic scale changes at 1 second resolution. Extensive research infrastructure for instrument development was established, particularly for micrometeorology, atmospheric electricity and around the use of meteorological radiosondes enhanced to provide more than the traditional thermodynamic quantities. Notable events detected at the Observatory include solar radiation and other meteorological effects of six partial solar eclipses from 1996-2015, with the most dramatic being the near-total eclipse on 11 August 1999. A video shows the observatory as it is today and describes some of the findings from research carried out there.
