= Whiteknights Park =

Main campus of the University of Reading, Berkshire, England

Coordinates: 51°26′26.47″N 0°56′41.30″W

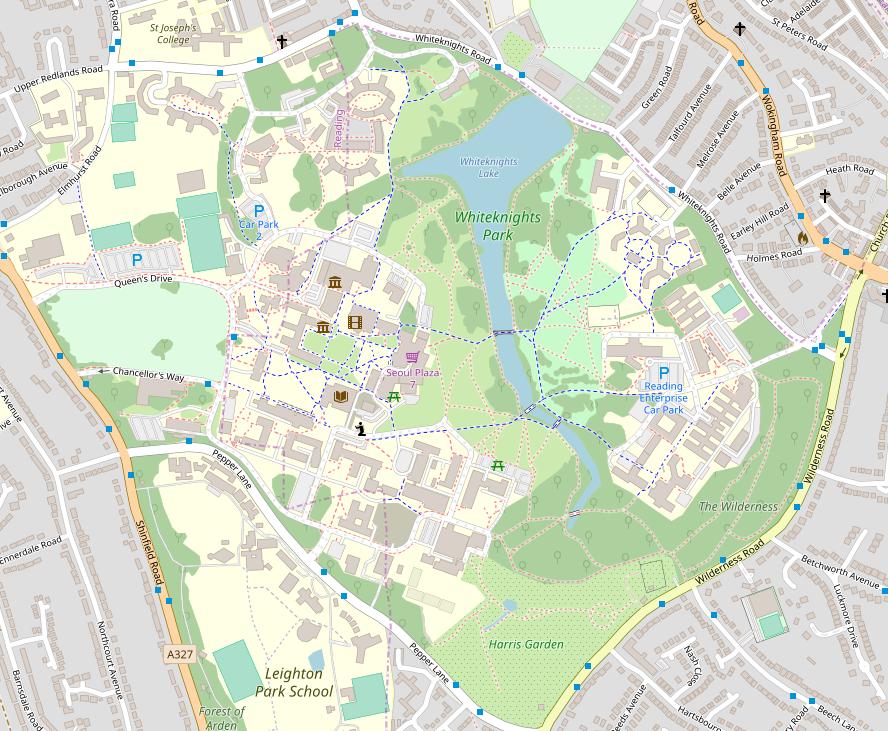
Map of Whiteknights campus

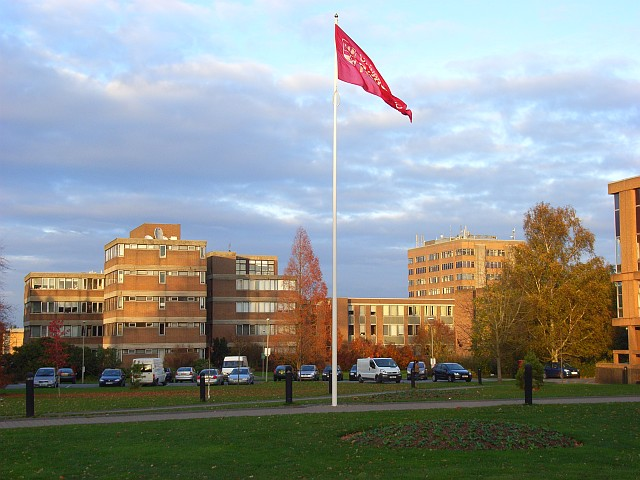
University buildings from Queens Drive

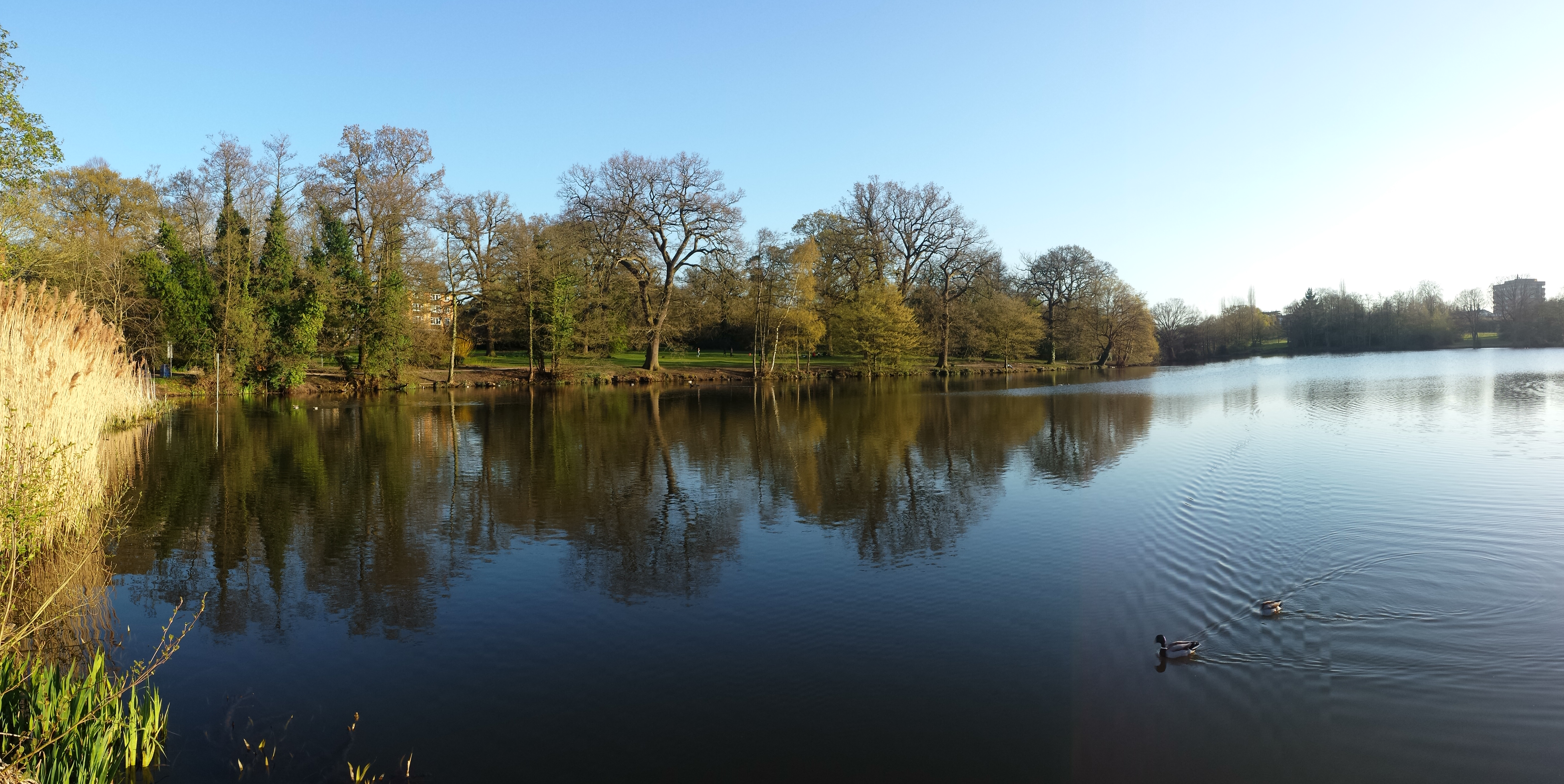
Whiteknights Lake

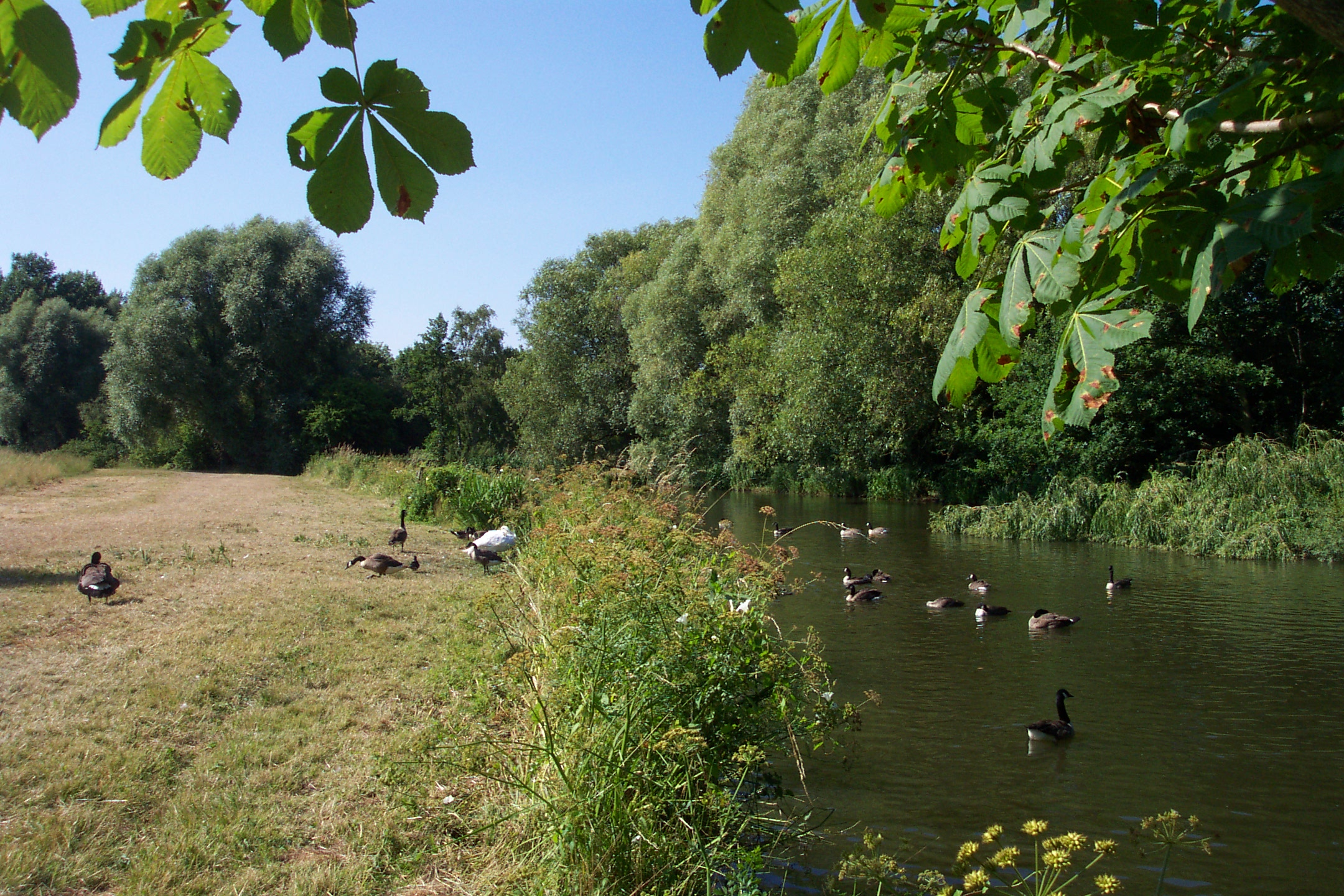
A quiet corner

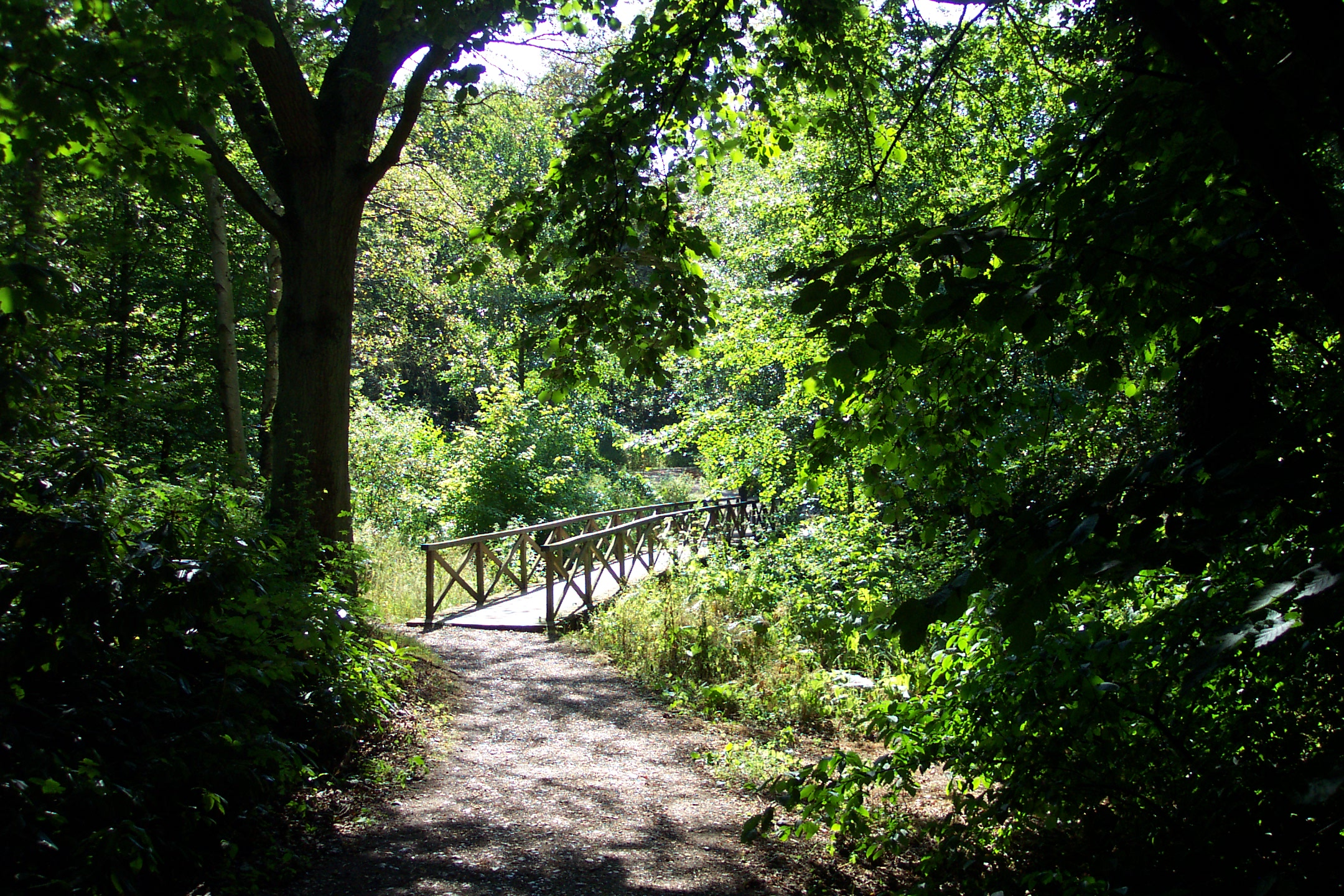
The woodlands

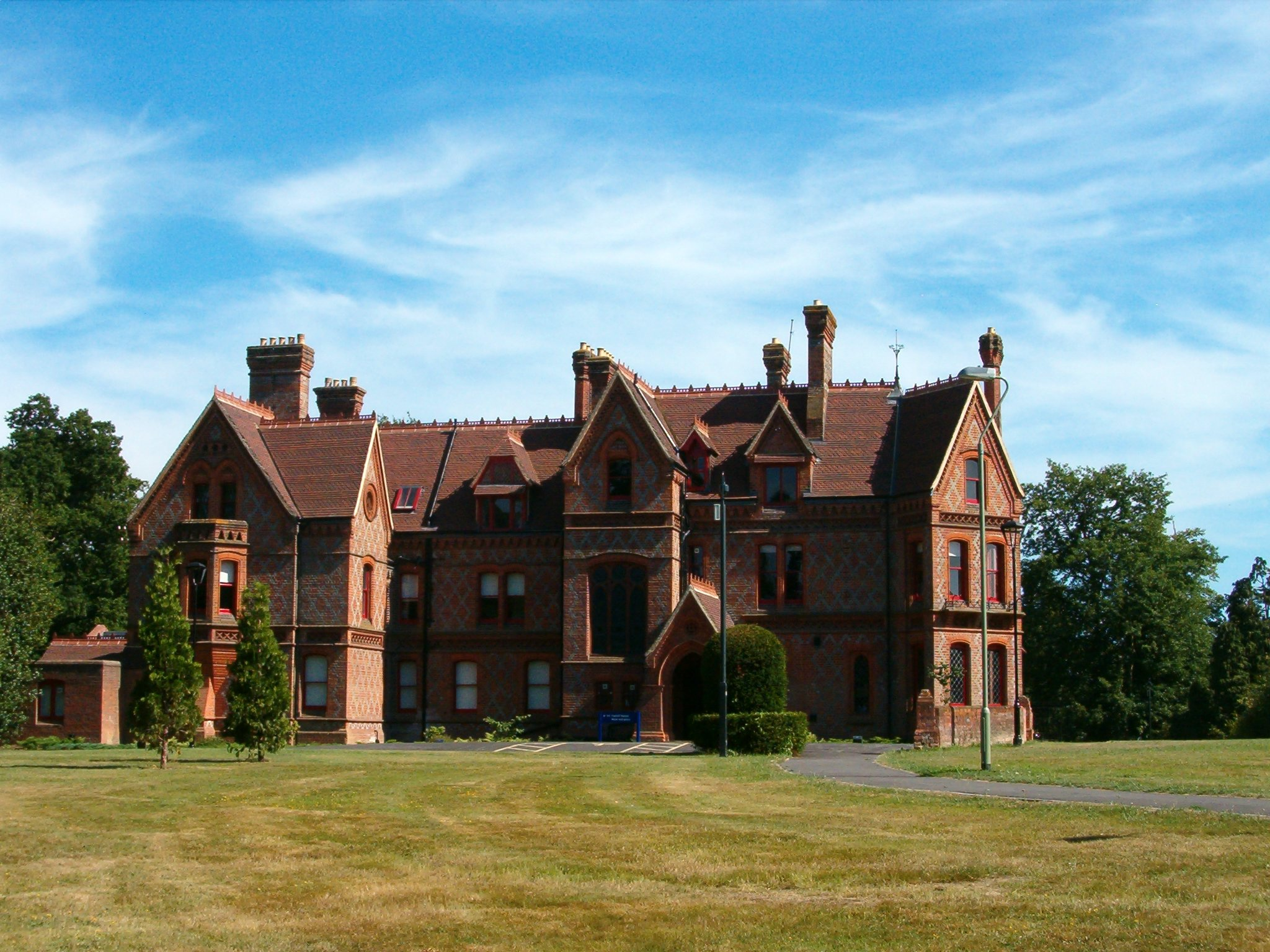
Foxhill House

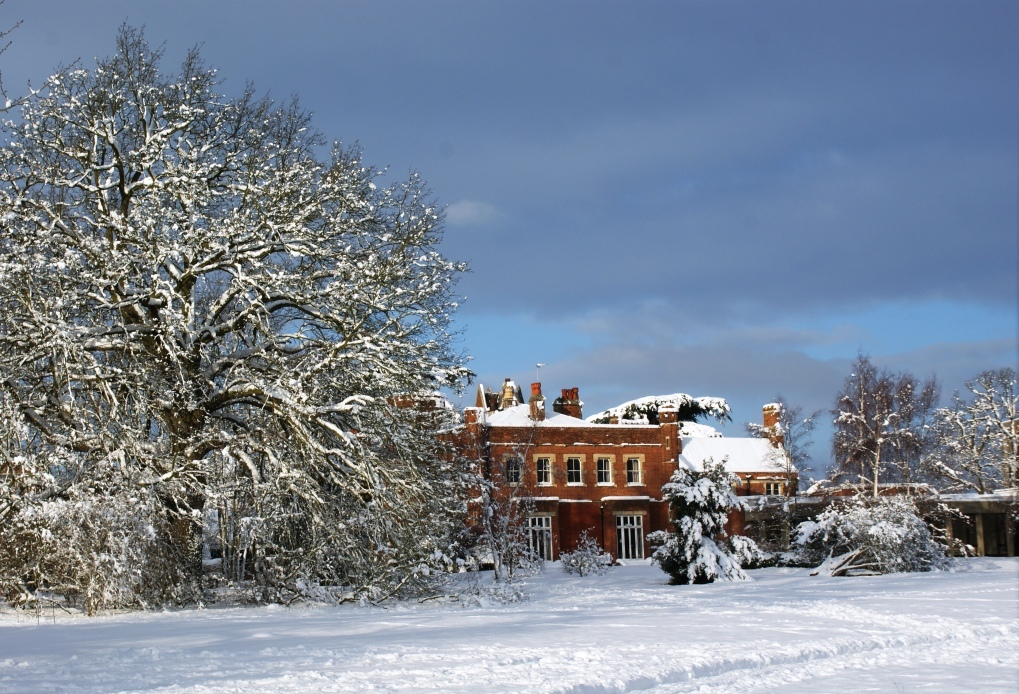
Park House in winter.

Whiteknights Park, or the Whiteknights Campus of the University of Reading, is the principal campus of that university. The park covers the area of the manor of Earley Whiteknights, also known as Earley St Nicholas and Earley Regis.

Whiteknights Park is some two miles south of the centre of the town of Reading in the English county of Berkshire. The campus is 1.3 square kilometres (321 acres) in size and includes lakes, conservation meadows and woodlands as well as being home to most of the university's academic departments and several halls of residence.

== History ==
The site was the home of John De Erleigh II, the famous foster-son of the Regent of England, William Marshal, but takes its name from the nickname of his great grandson, the 13th-century knight, John De Erleigh IV, the 'White Knight'. The De Erleigh (or D'Earley) family were owners of this manor for some two hundred years before 1365. St. Thomas Cantilupe, Bishop of Hereford and advisor to King Edward I, was allowed to live there briefly during the 1270s. In 1606 the estate was purchased by the nephew of Sir Francis Englefield, following the confiscation of Englefield House and its estates in 1585. The Englefield family in turn sold the estate to George Spencer-Churchill, the Marquis of Blandford, in 1798.

Between 1798 and 1819, the estate was the scene of vast extravagance and wild entertainments, all at the Marquis' expense. Splendid gardens were laid out, complete with the rarest of plants. In 1819, George Spencer, by now the Duke of Marlborough, became bankrupt and moved to his family home at Blenheim Palace at Woodstock in Oxfordshire.

The gardens of the Whiteknights estate have been described in a book by Barbara Hofland with engraved pictures of the gardens and its multitude of bridges, fountains, seats and grottoes by her husband Thomas Christopher Hofland. The book was ordered by the then Marquess of Blandford, but like many other items that he ordered or purchased, it was never paid for.

The gardens boasted a "chantilly garden" in the French style, a vineyard, a wilderness, a cottage, a gothic chapel, botanical gardens full of the rarest plants, many of them new from the Americas, an iron bridge, a stone bridge, an extensive sheep walk, an elm grove, an oak grove, a cedar seat, wychelms and cedars, an ice house, several conservatories, greenhouses and heated basins. In the grounds, cast-iron or wooden baskets filled with scarlet sage or the then exotic begonias were scattered throughout the lawns. There were many, some garden-critics commented "too many" seats, covered seats, treillages and pavilions. Mary Soames, who wrote a book about the 5th Duke of Marlborough and his gardens in Whiteknights and Blenheim remarked that the 280 acres were "too small a canvas" for the marquesses' "broad brush".

The estate was sold off and the house was demolished in 1840, supposedly by a mob of the Duke's angry creditors. The land was broken up into six leasehold units in 1867 and a number of the new houses were designed by Alfred Waterhouse, including his own residence at Foxhill House and the smaller Whiteknights House (now called Old Whiteknights House) for his father. In the years after the second World War some traces of the gardens of the Marquess of Blandford have been discovered. There were a few old exotic trees and part of a fountain was found on a skip.

During the Second World War, part of the park closest to the Earley Gate entrance was used for 'temporary' government offices, and several ranges of these single story, brick built, corridor and spur buildings still stand. After the war, this area became home to the Region 6 War Room responsible for civil defence in south-central England. The resulting nuclear bunker constructed in the 1950s still stands in a little visited corner of the campus, although demolition had been proposed in the 2007 campus development plan. However, in March 2009 the threatened building was given Grade II listed status, so demolition seems unlikely.

== Campus ==
The University of Reading purchased Whiteknights Park in 1947, and today it is the home of the university's administration, most of the academic departments and six halls of residence. The halls of residence (Bridges, Childs, MacKinder, Stenton, Windsor, and Wessex) are all along Whiteknights Road and Upper Redlands Road sides of the campus, with their own vehicular access off those roads and with only pedestrian access to the core of the campus.

Along the Wilderness Road and Pepper Lane sides of the campus, the campus is screened from the outside by undeveloped woodland and by the Harris Garden, the university's botanical garden. The campus core is therefore only easily visible from outside in the area around the main entrance on the Shinfield Road and the adjacent Elmhurst Road.

The centre of the campus is bisected into two unequal halves by a chain of lakes which are crossed by several pedestrian bridges but with no vehicular link. To the west of the lakes can be found most of the academic departments, catering services, the university administration and the students union building. With the exception of a couple of surviving Victorian residences, including Foxhill House, all of these are housed in purpose built buildings dating from the 1950s to the 2000s. The Ure Museum of Greek Archaeology, University of Reading Herbarium and the Cole Museum of Zoology are both found in this area. The largest building on the campus, the Edith Morley Building, forms one end of the central courtyard. Previously known as the HumSS (Humanities and Social Sciences) building before being renamed in commemoration of Edith Morley in 2017, it is sometimes nicknamed 'The Maze' due to its significant size and complex layout of corridors.

The RUSU building comprises the students' union itself, a small parade of shops including a bubble tea shop, cafe and an oriental mini supermarket as well as two of the university's bars and clubs. Next door to the RUSU building is a branch of Co-op Food.

To the east of the lakes and surrounding conservation meadowland is the Earley Gate area of the campus. The second-world war era buildings here house the Fine Art Department, the Department of Typography and Graphic Communication, and various service functions. More recent buildings, dating from the 1990s and 2000s, house the Department of Applied Statistics; the Department of Meteorology; the School of Agriculture, Policy and Development; and the School of Psychology and Clinical Language Sciences. Also in this area can be found the Reading Enterprise Centre, the Science & Technology Centre, the University Atmospheric Observatory, and an NHS Speech and Language Therapy clinic, used by the students and staff of the Department of Clinical Language Sciences.

== Local government ==
Although Whiteknights is much closer to the centre of the town of Reading than it is to the town of Wokingham, the boundary between the unitary authorities of Reading and Wokingham meanders across the campus in a rather unpredictable fashion. The campus is split about one third to Reading, two-thirds to Wokingham.

== See also ==
- Leighton Park School
- List of parks and open spaces in Reading, Berkshire
- Reading Half Marathon

== Literature ==
- Mary Soames; The Profligate Duke: George Spencer Churchill, Fifth Duke of Marlborough, and His Duchess (1987)
- Barbara Hofland White-Knights. A Poem called: "A Descriptive Account of the Mansion and Gardens of White-Knights, a Seat of His Grace the Duke of Marlborough", seen on 1819.
- A descriptive account of the mansion and gardens of White-Knights: a seat of His Grace the Duke of Marlborough. By Mrs. Hofland. Illustrated with twenty-three engravings, from pictures taken on the spot by T.C. Hofland. 1819
