= HMS Diomede =

Four ships of the Royal Navy have been named HMS Diomede. A fifth was planned but never completed:

- HMS Diomede (1781) was a 44-gun fourth-rate two-decker launched in 1781 and wrecked in 1795.
- HMS Diomede (1798) was a 50-gun fourth rate built as HMS Firm but renamed in 1794 and launched in 1798. She was sold in 1815.
- HMS Diomede was to have been a wooden screw sloop, projected in 1866 but cancelled in 1867.
- HMS Diomede (D92) was a Danae-class light cruiser launched in 1919 and sold in 1946.
- HMS Diomede (F16) was a Leander-class frigate launched in 1969. She was sold to Pakistan and handed over in 1988, as Shamsher. She served until 2003.

== See also ==
- Diomede (disambiguation)
