= Dzemidovich =

Dzemidovich (Belarusian: Дземідовіч) is a gender-neutral Belarusian surname. The Russian variant is Demidovich. Notable people with the surname include:

- Alyaksandr Dzemidovich (born 1989), Belarusian football player
- Boris Demidovich (1906–1977), Belarusian mathematician
- Vadzim Dzemidovich (born 1985), Belarusian football player
