= Diomidis Komninos =

Greek activist

Diomidis Komninos

Diomidis Komninos (Greek: Διομήδης Κομνηνός; 1956–1973), a Cypriot Greek high school student, was the first casualty of the Athens Polytechnic uprising. He was shot opposite the main gate of the Polytechnic.

== The events ==
On the night of Friday, November 16, 1973, police forces started confronting the thousands of protesters gathered inside and outside the Polytechnic campus, located on Patission Street, one of the busiest in Athens. Komnenos was one of the many high school students barricaded inside the Polytechnic. At about 10:00 pm, the police used guns and smoke-bombs to evacuate the streets from the protesters. At the time, Komninos had joined other students on the corner of Tritis Septemvriou Street and Averof St., exactly across from the Polytechnic. It is reported that Komninos went from the student side to the middle of the street toward the police lines and raising his hands he told them from a distance of about forty metres: "If you are men come and hit us from up close". The students were reportedly hit by sniper fire from the roofs of the neighbouring buildings. Komnenos was killed at 10:15 p.m. when a bullet pierced his heart. His name was in the indictment against the junta members during the Greek Junta Trials.

== Recognition ==
Diomidis Komninos is considered by many a heroic symbol of the Athens Polytechnic uprising. The student uprising is credited with helping trigger the eventual collapse of the military regime which ruled Greece since April 21, 1967. Nevertheless, the Polytechnic uprising was used as a pretext by junta hardliner Brigadier Dimitrios Ioannides to overthrow George Papadopoulos on November 25, 1973, and to put an end to a "liberalisation process" headed by Spiros Markezinis. The Ioannidis regime collapsed in July 1974 following the escalation of events in Cyprus that led to the Metapolitefsi.

Poet Anestis Evengelou has created a collection of apostrophic poems, resembling hymns or prayers, titled after Komnenos in which he mentions: "Seventeen years old. Volunteer carrier of the casualties. Razed by bullets the Night of the Great Slaughter. 17 November '73 at the Polytechnic".

Poet Dimitris Ravanis-Rentis wrote the poetic dedication "To Diomidis Komninos".

His torn shirt is exhibited at the memorial of the victims of the Polytechnic uprising and was held by Hortensia Allende to wipe her tears, during her visit there.
