= Diomede Bay =

Inlet of the Peter the Great Gulf, Vladivostok, Russia

Coordinates: 43°05′24″N 131°53′50″E

The Diomede Bay (Russian: бухта Диомид, also Diomid Bay or Diomedes Bay) is an inlet of the Peter the Great Gulf in the Russian city of Vladivostok. The bay derives its name from Diomedes, the first Russian brig to cast anchor in the bay back in 1862. The coastline is dotted with run-down fisheries, fishing wharves, and depots.
