= List of rivers of England =

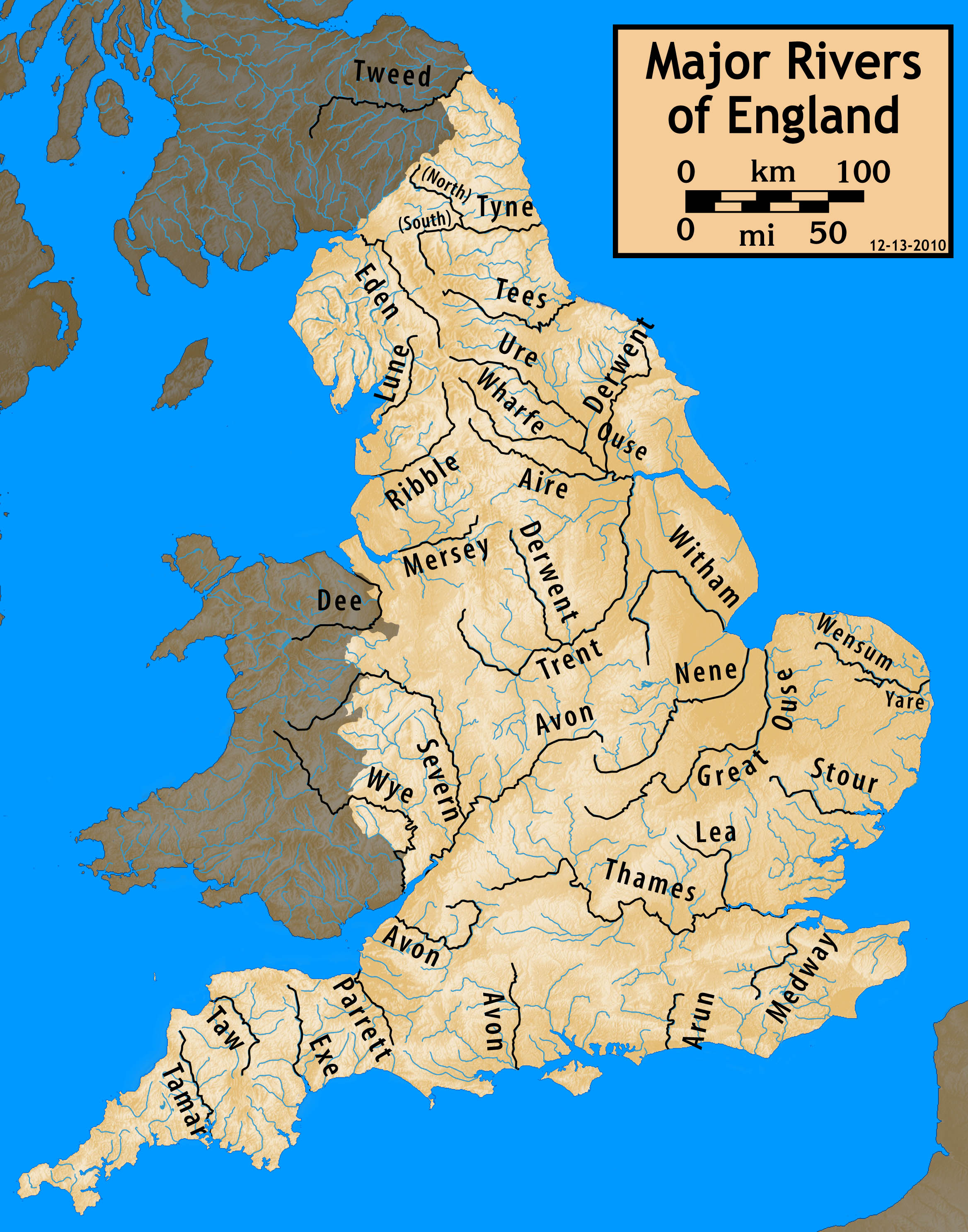

This is a list of rivers of England, organised geographically and taken anti-clockwise around the English coast where the various rivers discharge into the surrounding seas, from the Solway Firth on the Scottish border to the Welsh Dee on the Welsh border, and again from the Wye on the Welsh border anti-clockwise to the Tweed on the Scottish border.

Tributaries are listed down the page in an upstream direction, i.e. the first tributary listed is closest to the sea, and tributaries of tributaries are treated similarly. Thus, in the first catchment below, the River Sark is the lowermost tributary of the Border Esk and the Hether Burn is the lowermost tributary of the River Lyne. The main stem (or principal) river of a catchment is labelled as (MS), left-bank tributaries are indicated by (L), right-bank tributaries by (R). Note that in general usage, the 'left (or right) bank of a river' refers to the left (or right) hand bank, as seen when looking downstream. Where a named river derives from the confluence of two differently named rivers these are labelled as (Ls) and (Rs) for the left and right forks (the rivers on the left and right, relative to an observer facing downstream). A prime example is the River Tyne (MS), the confluence of the South Tyne (Rs) and the North Tyne (Ls) near Hexham. Those few watercourses (mainly in the Thames catchment) which branch off a major channel and then rejoin it or another watercourse further downstream are known as distributaries or anabranches and are labelled (d).

The list will encompass most of the main rivers of England (as defined by the Environment Agency) and which includes those named watercourses for which the Environment Agency has a flood defence function. Many rivers and streams which are not classed as 'main rivers' also appear. Some minor watercourses are included in the list, especially if they are named as 'river'- such examples may be labelled (m).

For simplicity, they are divided here by the coastal sections within which each river system discharges to the sea. In the case of the rivers which straddle the borders with Scotland and Wales, such as the Border Esk, Tweed, Dee, Severn and Wye, only those tributaries which lie at least partly in England are included.

== Western (Irish Sea) discharges from north-south ==
This section includes all rivers entering the Irish Sea from England between the Scottish border and the Welsh border.

=== Cumbrian coast ===
All rivers discharging into the Solway Firth, Irish Sea and Morecambe Bay from the Scottish border south to Silverdale on the Cumbria/Lancashire border.

==== Flowing into the Solway Firth ====
Border Esk catchment

The lowest reaches of the Esk are in England but most of the river is in Scotland whilst a short section is followed by the England/Scotland border. Tributaries of the Esk which are wholly in Scotland are omitted from this list but may be found at List of rivers of Scotland.

- River Esk (MS)
  - River Sark (or 'Sark Water') (R) (upper reaches in Scotland, part of river is followed by England/Scotland border)
  - River Lyne (L)
    - Hether Burn (L)
    - Rae Burn (R)
    - Black Lyne (Rs)
      - Bailey Water (R)
    - White Lyne (Ls)
  - Carwinley Burn (L)
  - Liddel Water (L) (part of river is followed by England/Scotland border)
    - Kershope Burn (L) (larger part of river is in Scotland, part of river is followed by England/Scotland border)

All further upstream tributaries of the Esk are wholly in Scotland.

Eden catchment

- River Eden (MS)
  - River Caldew (L)
    - Little Caldew (L) (Tributary and distributary)
    - River Roe (R)
      - River Ive (Rs)
      - Roe Beck (Ls)
    - Cald Beck (L)
    - Gillcambon Beck (R)
    - Carrock Beck (L)
    - Grainsgill Beck (L)
    - Blackhazel Beck (R)
  - River Petteril (L)
  - River Irthing (R)
    - River Gelt (R)
    - Old Water (R)
    - Cam Beck (R)
    - King Water (R)
    - Gair Burn (Ls)
    - Tarn Beck (Rs)
  - Raven Beck (R)
  - River Eamont (L)
    - River Lowther (R)
      - Haweswater Beck (L)
      - Swindale Beck (or Swindale River) (L)
    - Thacka Beck (L) (Distributary of River Peterill)
      - Dog Beck (known as Myers Beck upstream) (L)
    - Dacre Beck (L)
  - Crowdundle Beck (R)
  - River Lyvennet (L) (known as Lyvennet Beck upstream)
    - River Leith (L) (known as Shap Beck upstream)
  - Hoff Beck (L)
  - Helm Beck (L)
  - Swindale Beck (R)
  - River Belah (R)
    - Argill Beck (R)
  - Scandal Beck (L)

Wampool catchment

- River Wampool (MS)
  - Chalk Beck (L)

Minor coastal catchments

- River Waver (MS)
- River Ellen (MS)

==== Flowing into the Irish Sea ====
Derwent catchment

- River Derwent (MS)
  - River Marron (L)
    - Lostrigg Beck (L)
  - River Cocker (L)
  - Dash Beck (R) (flows into Bassenthwaite Lake)
    - Chapel Beck (L)
  - Newlands Beck (L) (flows into Bassenthwaite Lake)
    - Coledale Beck (L)
    - Keskadale Beck (L)
    - Scope Beck (L) (m)
  - River Greta (R)
    - Glenderaterra Beck (R)
    - Naddle Beck (L) (m)
    - St. John's Beck (Ls)
    - River Glenderamackin (Rs)
      - Mosedale Beck (L)
  - Watendlath Beck (R) (flows into Derwent Water)
  - Stonethwaite Beck (R)

Minor coastal catchments

- Lowca Beck (MS)
- Pow Beck (MS)

Ehen catchment

- River Ehen (MS)
  - River Keekle (R)
  - River Liza (enters head of Ennerdale Water)

Calder catchment

- River Calder (MS)
  - Worm Gill (L)

Cumbrian Esk catchment

- River Esk (MS)
  - River Irt (R)
    - River Bleng (R)
    - Mosedale Beck (flows into Wast Water)
    - Lingmell Beck (flows into Wast Water)
  - River Mite (R)
  - Whillan Beck (R)

Minor coastal catchment

- River Annas (MS)

Duddon catchment

- River Duddon (MS)
  - Kirkby Pool (L)
  - River Lickle (L)

==== Flowing into Morecambe Bay ====
Minor Coastal catchment

- Mill Beck (MS)
  - Poaka Beck (L)
  - Goldmire Beck (R)
- Dragley Beck (MS)

Leven catchment

- River Leven (MS)
  - Newland Beck (R)
  - River Eea (L)
  - River Crake (R) (drains Coniston Water)
    - Church Beck (R) (enters Coniston Water)
    - Yewdale Beck (R) (enters Coniston Water)
  - Rusland Pool (R)
  - Cunsey Beck (R) (enters Windermere, west bank; drains Esthwaite Water)
    - Black Beck (enters head of Esthwaite Water)
  - Trout Beck (L) (enters Windermere, east bank)
  - River Brathay (combines with Rothay to enter head of Windermere)
    - Great Langdale Beck (L)
  - River Rothay (combines with Brathay to enter head of Windermere)
    - Stock Ghyll (L)
    - Scandale Beck (L)
    - Rydal Beck (L)

Kent catchment

- River Kent (MS)
  - River Winster (R)
  - River Bela (L)
    - Peasey Beck (Ls) (?known as Killington Beck upstream)
      - Lupton Beck (L)
    - Stainton Beck (Rs) (known as St. Sunday's Beck upstream)
  - River Gilpin (R)
    - River Pool (L)
  - River Mint (L)
    - Ashstead Beck (Ls)
    - Bannisdale Beck (Rs)?
  - River Sprint (L)
  - River Gowan (R)

=== Lancashire and Cheshire coast ===
All rivers discharging into the Irish Sea from Silverdale on the Cumbria/Lancashire border south to the Dee Estuary.

Keer catchment

- River Keer (MS)

Lune catchment

- River Lune (MS)
  - River Conder (L)
  - Artle Beck (L)
  - River Wenning (L)
    - River Hindburn (L)
      - River Roeburn (L)
    - Keasden Beck (L)
  - River Greta (L)
    - River Doe (Rs)
    - River Twiss (Ls) (known as Kingsdale Beck upstream)
  - Leck Beck (L)
  - Barbon Beck (L)
  - River Rawthey (L)
    - River Dee (L)
      - Deepdale Beck (L)
    - Clough River (L)
  - Borrow Beck (R)
  - Birk Beck (R)

Cocker catchment

- River Cocker (MS)
- Broad Fleet (MS)

Wyre catchment

- River Wyre (MS)
  - Main Dyke (L)
  - River Brock (L)
    - New Draught (L) (taking Woodplumpton Brook etc.)
  - River Calder (L)
  - Tarnbrook Wyre (Rs)
    - River Grizedale (R) (m)
  - Marshaw Wyre (Ls)

Ribble catchment

- River Ribble (MS)
  - Wrea Brook / Main Drain (R)
  - River Douglas (also known as River Asland) (L)
    - Douglas Navigation
    - River Yarrow (R)
      - River Lostock (R)
      - River Chor (R)
      - Black Brook (R)
      - Green Withins Brook? (m)
    - Eller Brook (L)
    - River Tawd (L)
  - Freckleton Pool (R)
  - Savick Brook (R)
  - River Darwen (L)
    - River Roddlesworth (L)
    - River Blakewater (R) ?reference (rises as Knuzden Brook)
  - Park Brook (L)
  - River Calder (L)
    - Sabden Brook (R)
    - Hyndburn Brook (L)
      - River Hyndburn (R)
    - Pendle Water (R)
      - Colne Water (L)
        - River Laneshaw (Rs)
        - Wycoller Beck (Ls)
    - River Brun (L)
      - River Don (R)
  - River Hodder (R)
    - River Loud (R)
    - Langden Brook (R)
    - River Dunsop (R)
      - Brennand River (Rs)
      - Whitendale River (Ls)
    - Croasdale Brook (R)
    - Bottoms Beck (L) (enters Stocks Reservoir)
  - Skirden Beck (R)
    - Holden Beck (R)
    - Monubent Beck (L)
  - Stock Beck (L)
  - Long Preston Beck (L)
  - Stainforth Beck (L)
  - Cam Beck (L)
  - Gayle Beck (L)

Minor coastal catchments

- Crossens Pool (MS)
  - The Sluice
  - Three Pools Waterway

Alt catchment

- River Alt (MS)
  - Downholland Brook (R)

Mersey catchment

- River Mersey (MS)
  - The Birket (L)
    - River Fender (R)
      - Prenton Brook (L)
    - Arrowe Brook (R)
      - Greasby Brook (L)
        - Newton Brook (L)
  - River Dibbin (L)
  - Spittal Brook (L)
  - River Gowy (L)
  - River Weaver (L)
    - River Dane (R)
      - River Wheelock (L)
      - River Croco (R)
    - River Waldron (R)
  - Ditton Brook (R)
  - River Bollin (L)
    - Birkin Brook (L)
      - River Lily (L) (m) (enters Tatton Mere)
    - River Dean (R)
  - Red Brook (L)
  - Glaze Brook (R)
  - River Irwell (R) (subsumed within the Manchester Ship Canal in lower reaches)
    - River Medlock (L)
      - River Tib (subterranean)
    - River Irk (L)
      - Boggart Hole Brook
      - Moston Brook
    - River Croal (R)
      - River Tonge (L)
        - Bradshaw Brook (L)
        - Astley Brook
        - Eagley Brook
    - River Roch (L)
      - Naden Brook (R)
      - River Spodden (R)
      - River Beal (L)
  - Chorlton Brook
  - Micker Brook (L)
  - River Tame (Rs)
    - Greenfield Brook (R)
    - Chew Brook (L)
  - River Goyt (Ls)
    - River Etherow (R)
      - Glossop Brook (L)
      - Heyden Brook (R)
    - Todd Brook (L)
    - River Sett (R)
      - River Kinder (R)

The Dee and most of its tributaries arise in Wales. Though a section of it passes through England, it passes into Wales once again before discharging into the Irish Sea via the Dee estuary. For other rivers entering the Irish Sea and Cardigan Bay from Wales, see List of rivers of Wales. Only those tributaries of the River Dee which flow wholly or partly in England are listed here – for a complete list of the rivers and watercourses of the Dee catchment see List of rivers of Wales.

Dee catchment

- River Dee (MS) (Afon Dyfrdwy in Welsh)
  - Shotwick Brook (R)
  - Caldy Brook (R)
  - Henlake Brook (R) (m)
  - Powsey Brook (R)
  - Aldford Brook (R)
  - Wych Brook (R)
    - Emral Brook (L)
    - Red Brook (L)

All further upstream tributaries of the Dee are wholly in Wales.

== Western discharges (for Bristol Channel & Southwest Approaches) from east-west ==
This section includes all rivers entering the Bristol Channel and the sea off the northern coasts of Devon and Cornwall which is referred to variously as the Southwest Approaches or Celtic Sea.

=== Rivers Severn and Wye ===
The lowermost Wye forms the boundary between England and Wales. Only those tributaries of the River Wye which flow wholly or partly in England are listed here – for a complete list of the rivers and watercourses of the Wye catchment and for other rivers entering the Bristol Channel from Wales see List of rivers of Wales.

Wye catchment

- River Wye (MS)
  - Valley Brook (L)
  - River Monnow (R)
    - River Dore (L)
      - Worm Brook (L)
  - Garren Brook (R)
    - Gamber Brook (L)
  - Rudhall Brook (L)
  - River Lugg (L)
    - River Frome (L)
      - River Loddon (R)
    - Wellington Brook (R)
    - Humber Brook (L)
    - River Arrow (R)
      - Stretford Brook (R)
        - Tippet's Brook (L)
      - Curl Brook (R)
      - Cynon Brook (L)
      - Gladestry Brook (L)
    - Cheaton Brook (L)
    - Main Drain (L)
    - Pinsley Brook (R)
    - Hindwell Brook (R)
  - Norton Brook (R)
  - Letton Lake (L)
  - Dulas Brook (R)

All further upstream tributaries of the Wye are wholly in Wales.

The River Severn upstream of the M48 Severn Bridge. This section includes all tributaries of the Severn which lie wholly or partly in England. For tributaries of the Severn which lie partly or wholly within Wales, see List of rivers of Wales.

Severn catchment

- River Severn (Afon Hafren) (MS)
  - Little Avon River (L)
  - River Lyd (R)
  - River Frome, Stroud (L)
  - River Cam, Gloucestershire (L)
  - River Leadon (R)
  - River Chelt (L)
  - River Avon, Warwickshire (L)
    - River Swilgate (L)
    - Bow Brook (R)
    - Piddle Brook (R)
    - River Isbourne (L)
    - Badsey Brook (L)
    - River Arrow (R)
      - River Alne (L)
    - River Stour, Warwickshire (L)
    - River Dene (L)
    - River Leam (L)
      - River Itchen, Warwickshire (L)
    - River Sowe (R)
      - Finham Brook (R)
      - River Sherbourne (R)
      - Smite Brook (L)
    - River Swift (R)
  - River Teme (R)
    - Laughern Brook (L)
    - Leigh Brook (R)
    - Sapey Brook (R)
    - River Rea, Shropshire (L)
      - Mill Brook, Shropshire (R)
    - Kyre Brook (R)
    - Ledwyche Brook (L)
    - River Corve (L)
    - River Onny (L)
      - Quinny Brook (L)
      - River East Onny (Ls)
      - River West Onny (Rs)
    - River Clun, Shropshire (L)
      - River Redlake (R)
      - River Kemp (L)
      - River Unk (L)
      - Folly Brook (L)
  - River Salwarpe (L)
    - Hadley Brook (R)
  - Grimley Brook (R)
  - Shrawley Brook (R)
  - Dick Brook (R)
  - River Stour, Worcestershire (L)
    - River Smestow (Smestow Brook) (R)
      - Wom Brook (L)
  - Dowles Brook (R)
  - Borle Brook (R)
  - Mor Brook (R)
  - River Worfe (L)
    - Wesley Brook R
  - Harley Brook (R)
  - Cound Brook (R)
  - River Tern (L)
    - River Roden (R)
    - River Strine (L)
    - River Meese (L)
    - River Duckow (R)
  - Rea Brook (R) (A small part of the upper catchment of the Rea Brook lies in Wales)
  - River Perry, Shropshire (L)
  - River Vyrnwy (Welsh: Afon Efyrnwy) (L) (lowermost section in England, rest in Wales)
    - River Morda (L)
    - River Tanat (L) (lowermost section in England, rest in Wales)
      - Cynllaith (L) (part forms the border between England and Wales)
  - Camlad (R) (part in Wales, part in England)

With the exception of the Morda and parts of the Camlad, Tanat and Cynllaith all tributaries of the Severn and Vyrnwy upstream of their confluence are in Wales. They can be found here.

=== Bristol Channel ===
All English rivers discharging into the Severn Estuary and the Bristol Channel from the M48 Severn Bridge south and west to Morte Point, North Devon.

Bristol Avon catchment

- River Avon (MS)
  - River Trym (R)
    - Hazel Brook (R)
  - River Frome (R)
  - River Malago (The Malago) (L)
  - Brislington Brook (L)
  - Siston Brook (R)
  - River Chew (L)
  - River Boyd (R)
  - Newton Brook (L)
  - Lam Brook (R)
  - By Brook (R)
  - Midford Brook (L)
    - Cam Brook (Ls)
    - Wellow Brook (Rs)
      - River Somer (R)
  - River Frome (L)
  - Henhambridge Brook (L)
    - Mells River (L)
      - Egford Brook/Nunney Brook (R)
    - Rodden Brook (R)
      - Redford Water (L)
  - River Biss (L)
  - Semington Brook (L)
  - Cocklemore Brook (R)
  - River Marden (L)
  - Brinkworth Brook (L)
  - Gauze Brook (R)
  - Woodbridge Brook (L)
    - Tetbury Avon (River Avon, Tetbury Branch) (Ls)
    - Sherston Avon (River Avon, Sherston Branch) (Rs)

Minor coastal catchments

- Land Yeo (MS)
- Blind Yeo (MS)
- River Kenn (MS)
- Little River (MS)
- Congresbury Yeo (MS)
  - Oldbridge River (L)
- River Banwell (MS)

Axe catchment

- River Axe (MS)
  - Mark Yeo (L)
  - Lox Yeo (R)
  - Cheddar Yeo (R)

Brue catchment

- River Brue (MS)
  - North Drain (R)
  - River Sheppey via the Decoy Rhine (R)
  - Whitelake River (R)
  - River Alham (R)
  - River Pitt (L)
  - Pillrow Cut?

Parrett catchment

- River Parrett (MS)
  - Huntspill River (R)
    - Black Ditch (L)
    - Cripps River (Rs) (connects with River Brue)
    - South Drain (Ls)
    - Eighteen Foot Rhine?
  - Cannington Brook (L)
  - King's Sedgemoor Drain (R)
    - Sowy River (L)
    - Langacre Rhyne (L)
    - River Cary?
  - Horsey Pill?
  - Chinnock Water?
  - Sedgemoor Old Rhine?
  - Hamp Brook?
    - Cobb's Cross Stream?
  - North Moor Main Drain?
  - River Yeo (R) (also known as River Ivel)
    - Bearley Brook (L)
    - River Cam (R)
    - Hornsey Brook (R)
    - Trent Brook (R)
    - River Wriggle (or Wriggle River) (L)
  - River Tone (L)
  - River Isle (L)
    - Fivehead River (L)
      - Venner's Water (R)
  - Wellhams Brook (R)
  - Lopen Brook (L)
  - Broad River (R)

Minor coastal catchments

- Donniford Stream (MS)
  - Willet River (L)
- Washford River (MS)
- Pill River (MS)
- River Avill (MS)
- Horner Water (MS)
  - Nutscale Water?
    - Chetsford Water?

Lyn catchment

- East Lyn River (MS)
  - West Lyn River (L)
    - Barbrook (L)
  - Hoaroak Water (L)
    - Farley Water (R)
  - Oare Water (Rs)
  - Badgworthy Water (Ls)

Minor coastal catchments

- The Lee (MS)
- Hanging Water (MS)
- Hollow Brook (MS)

Heddon, Sherrycombe, Umber & Wilder catchments

- River Heddon (MS)
- Hill Brook (R)
- Sherrycombe (MS)
- River Umber (MS)
- Wilder Brook (MS)
  - East Wilder Brook (Rs)
  - West Wilder Brook (Ls)

=== Atlantic Coast of Devon and North Cornwall ===
Rivers discharging into the Atlantic Ocean between Morte Point in North Devon and Land's End.

Taw catchment

- River Taw (MS)
  - River Caen (R)
  - Knowl Water (R)
  - Bradiford Water (R)
    - Colam Stream (Rs)
  - River Yeo (R)
    - Mill Leat?
  - Langham Lake (L)
  - Hawkridge Brook (R)
  - River Mole (R)
    - Colley Lake (L)
    - River Bray (R)
      - Nadrid Water
    - Little Silver Stream (L)
    - Crooked Oak (L)
    - River Yeo (Molland) (L)
  - Mully Brook (L)
  - Hollocombe Water (L)
  - Little Dart River (R)
    - Huntacott Water (R)
    - Adworthy Brook (R)
    - Sturcombe River (R)
  - River Yeo (R)
    - River Dalch (R)
    - Ash Brook (R)
    - Gissage Lake (L)
  - Bullow Brook (L) (m)

Torridge catchment

- River Torridge (MS)
  - River Yeo (L)
    - River Duntz (R)
      - Lydeland Water (L)
  - River Mere (L)
  - River Okement (R)
    - East Okement River (Rs)
      - Black-a-ven Brook
    - West Okement River (Ls)
      - Brim Brook
  - River Lew (R)
    - Waggaford Water (L)
    - Medland Brook (R)
    - Dunsland Brook (R)
      - Merryland Stream (R)
    - Pulworthy Brook
  - River Waldon (R)

Minor coastal catchments

- Abbey River (MS)
- Marsland Water (MS)
- The Tidna (MS)
- River Neet (MS)
  - River Strat (upper reaches)
- Wanson Water (MS)
- Millook Water (MS)
- River Valency (MS)
  - River Jordan
- Trevillet River (MS)

Camel catchment

- River Camel (MS)
  - River Amble (R)
  - Polmorla Brook
  - River Allen (R)
  - River Ruthern (L)
  - De Lank River (L)

Minor coastal catchments

- River Menalhyl (MS)
- River Gannel (MS)
- Red River (MS)
  - Tehidy Stream (R)
- River Hayle (MS)
- Stennack River (MS)

== Southern (English Channel) discharges from west-east ==
This section includes all rivers entering the sea along England's south coast.

=== South Coast of Cornwall and Devon ===
All rivers discharging into the Atlantic Ocean between Land's End, Cornwall and Lyme Regis on the Devon/Dorset border.

There are no watercourses named on either the 1:25,000 or 1:50,000 scale Ordnance Survey maps of the Isles of Scilly.

Minor coastal catchments

- Penberth River (MS)
- Lamorna River (MS)
- Newlyn River (MS)
- Larigan River (MS)
- Chyandour Brook (MS)
- Rosemorran Stream (MS)
  - Trevaylor Stream (R)
- Red River (MS)
- River Cober (MS)
- Dawlish Water (MS)
- Gara River (enters Slapton Ley)

Helford catchment

- Helford River (MS)
  - Ponsontuel Creek (R)
  - Frenchman's Creek (R)
  - Gillan Creek (R)
  - Port Navas Creek (L)

Restronguet catchment

- Restronguet Creek (MS)
  - Carnon River (Ls)
  - River Kennal (Rs)

Fal catchment

- River Fal (MS)
  - River Truro (R)
    - Tresillian River (L)
      - Trevella Stream (R)
    - River Kenwyn (R)
    - River Allen (R)
  - Ruan River (L) (m)

Percuil catchment

- Percuil River (MS)

St Austell catchment

- St Austell River (MS)

Par catchment

- River Par (MS)

Fowey catchment

- River Fowey (MS)
  - Pont Creek
  - Trebant Water (L) (enters via Penpol Creek)
  - River Lerryn (R)
  - Cardinham Water (R)
  - Warleggan River (R) (or River Bedalder)
  - St Neot River (R) (or River Loveny)

Pol catchment

- River Pol (MS) (or Polperrro River)

Looe catchment

- River Looe (MS)
  - East Looe River (Ls)
  - West Looe River (Rs)

Seaton catchment

- River Seaton (MS)
  - Tinker's Lake

Tamar catchment

- River Tamar (MS)
  - River Lynher (R) (or St Germans River)
    - River Tiddy (R)
    - Withey Brook (R)
  - River Tavy (L)
    - Rattle Brook (L)
    - Amicombe Brook (R)
      - Black Ridge Brook
      - Cut Combe Water
    - The Collybrooke
    - River Walkham (L)
    - River Lumburn (R)
    - River Wallabrooke (R)
    - River Burn (R)
  - Burcombe Lake (R)
  - Silver Brook, England (R)
  - Danescombe Lake (R)
    - Honiecombe Lake (R)
  - River Inny (R)
    - Penpont Water (R)
  - Lowley Brook (R)
  - River Lyd (L)
    - Doetor Brook (L)
    - Walla Brook (L)
    - River Wolf (R)
      - River Thrushel (L)
    - River Lew (R)
  - River Kensey (R)
  - River Carey (L)
  - River Ottery (R)
  - River Claw (L)
  - River Deer (L)

Plym catchment

- River Plym (MS)
  - Tory Brook (L)
  - River Meavy (R)
    - Hart Tor Brook (L)
    - Newleycombe Lake (L)
    - Narrator Brook (L)
    - Sheepstor Brook (L)
    - Lovaton Brook (L)

Yealm catchment

- River Yealm (MS)
  - Ranny Brook (L)
  - Broadall Lake (R)
    - Ford Brook (R)
  - Redaven Lake (L)
  - Piall River (L)
  - Mill Leat
  - Cofflete Creek
  - Shortaflete Creek
  - Newton Creek (R)
    - Noss Creek

Erme & Avon catchments etc.

- River Erme (MS)
  - Butter Brook (L)
  - Piles Brook (L)
  - Left Lake (L)
  - Dry Lake (L)
  - Bledge Brook (R)
  - Hook Lake (L)
  - Red Lake (L)
  - Dry Lake (L)
  - Blacklane Brook (L)
- River Avon (MS)
  - Western Wella Brook (L)
  - Brockhill Stream (L) (enters Avon Dam Reservoir)
  - Small Brook (L)
  - Bala Brook (R)
    - Red Brook (R)
    - Middle Brook (R)
  - Glaze Brook (R)
    - Scad Brook (R)
    - East Glaze Brook (Ls)
    - West Glaze Brook (Rs)

Kingsbridge catchment

- Bowcombe Creek
  - Southpool Creek
  - Waterhead Creek
  - Batson Creek
  - Blanksmill Creek
  - Collapit Creek
  - Frogmore Creek

Dart catchment

- River Dart (MS)
  - River Harbourne (R) (or Harbourne River)
    - River Wash (R)
  - River Hems (L)
    - Gatcombe Brook (L)
    - Am Brook (L)
  - River Mardle (R)
    - Dean Burn (R)
      - Moorshead Brook (R)
        - Addislade Water (L)
  - River Ashburn (L)
  - Holy Brook (R)
    - Holne Moor Leat (L) (Feeds Venford Reservoir and Holy Brook)
  - River Webburn (L)
    - East Webburn River (Ls)
    - West Webburn River (Rs)
  - Venford Brook (R)
    - Holne Moor Leat (L) (Feeds Venford Reservoir)
  - East Dart (Ls)
    - Walla Brook (L)
    - Cut Hill Stream (L) (Hangman's Stream)
    - Cut Lane Stream (L)
  - West Dart (Rs)
    - O Brook (R) (m)
    - River Swincombe (R) (Strane River, upper reaches)
    - Cherry Brook (L)
      - Muddilake Brook (R)
    - Blackbrook River (R)
    - Cowsic River (R)
    - Summer Brook (R)

Teign catchment

- River Teign (MS)
  - River Lemon (R)
    - River Sig (R)
      - Langworthy Brook (R)
  - Ventiford Brook (R)
    - Liverton Brook (R)
  - River Bovey (R)
    - Walla Brook (R)
    - Becka Brook (R)
    - Reddaford Water
      - Bovey Pottery Leat
  - South Teign River (Rs)
  - North Teign River (Ls)
  - Ugbrooke Stream (R)
  - Aller Brook (L)
  - Old Teign
  - Arch Brook (R)

Exe catchment

- River Exe (MS)
  - Staplake Brook (R)
  - River Kenn (R)
  - River Clyst (L)
  - Alphin Brook (R)
    - Fordland Brook (R)
    - Nadder Brook (L)
  - North Brook (L)
  - Longbrook (L)
  - Taddiforde Brook (L)
  - Duryard Stream (L)
  - River Creedy (R)
    - Small Brook
    - River Yeo (R)
      - River Culvery (R)
        - River Ted (Ls)
        - Lilly Brook (Rs)
      - River Troney
    - Holly Water
  - River Culm (L)
    - River Weaver (L)
    - Spratford Stream (R) (known as River Lyner in upper reaches)
    - River Kenn (L)
    - River Madford (L) (or Madford River)
      - Bolham River (R)
  - Burn River (L)
  - River Dart (Bickleigh) (R)
  - River Lowman (L)
  - River Batherm (L)
    - Ben Brook (R)
  - Iron Mill Stream (R)
  - Brockeye River (or River Brockey) (R)
  - River Barle (R)
  - River Haddeo (L)
  - River Quarme

Otter catchment

- River Otter (MS)
  - River Tale (R)

Sid catchment

- River Sid (MS)
  - Woolbrook (R)

Axe catchment

- River Axe (MS)
  - River Coly (R)
    - Umborne Brook (L)
    - Offwell Brook?
  - River Yarty (R)
    - Corrie Brook (R)
  - River Kit (R)
  - Blackwater River (L)
  - River Synderford (L)

=== Coast of Dorset and Hampshire ===
All rivers discharging into the English Channel between Lyme Regis on the Devon/Dorset border and Hayling Island on the Hampshire/Sussex border but excluding the Isle of Wight.

Minor coastal catchments

- River Lim (MS)
- River Char (MS)
- River Winniford (MS)

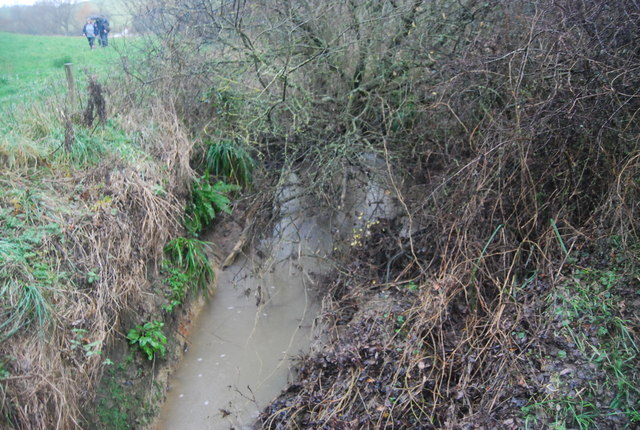
River Simene near Symondsbury

Brit catchment

- River Brit (or Britt) (MS)
  - River Simene (R)
  - River Asker (L)
    - Mangerton River (R)

Coastal catchments

- River Bride (MS)
- River Wey (MS)
  - Pucksey Brook (L)
- River Jordan (MS)

Poole Harbour (Frome and Piddle catchments and minor streams)

- River Frome (MS)
  - South Winterborne (R)
  - River Cerne (L)
  - Sydling Water (L)
  - River Hooke (R)
- River Piddle (MS) (also known as River Trent)
  - Bere Stream (L)
  - Devil's Brook (L)
- River Sherford (MS) (enters Lytchett Bay as Rock Lea River)
- Corfe River (MS) (enters Poole Harbour via Wych Lake)

Christchurch Harbour (Stour and Avon catchments)

- River Stour (MS)
  - Moors River (L) (River Crane in upper reaches)
  - River Allen (L)
  - River Winterborne (R)
  - The Tarrant (L)
  - River Iwerne (L)
  - River Divelish (R)
  - River Lydden (R)
    - Caundle Brook (L)
  - River Cale (R)
  - River Lodden (L)
- River Avon (also known as the Hampshire Avon or Salisbury Avon) (MS)
  - River Ebble (R)
  - River Bourne (L)
  - River Nadder (R)
    - River Wylye (R)
      - River Till (L)
  - Nine Mile River (L)
    - Damson Brook (R)

Minor coastal catchments

- Avon Water (Hampshire) (MS)
- Lymington River (MS)
- Beaulieu River (MS)
- Dark Water (MS)

Test catchment

- River Test (MS)
  - Bartley Water (R)
  - River Blackwater (R)
  - Cadnam River (R)
  - River Dun (R)
  - Park Stream (L)
  - Wallop Brook (R)
  - Marshcourt River (L)
  - River Anton (R)
  - River Dever (L)
  - Bourne Rivulet (R)

Itchen catchment

- River Itchen (MS) (and Barton River)
  - Monks Brook (R)
  - Candover Brook (R) (ref?)
  - River Alre (R)

Minor coastal catchments

- River Hamble (MS)
  - Ford Lake (R)
- River Meon (and Titchfield Haven) (MS)
- River Alver (MS)
- River Wallington (MS) (or Wallington River)
- Hermitage Stream (MS)
- River Ems (MS)
- River Lavant (MS)

=== Isle of Wight ===
All rivers in the Isle of Wight – list taken anticlockwise from Cowes

Medina catchment etc.

- River Medina (MS)
  - Lukely Brook (L)
- Gurnard Luck (MS)

Newtown River catchment

- Newtown River (MS)
  - Clamerkin Lake / Clamerkin Brook (R)
    - Rodge Brook (L)
  - Caul Bourne
  - Newtown Brook (R)

Western Yar catchment

- Western Yar (Yarmouth) (MS)
  - Thorley Brook (R)
  - Barnfields Stream (R)

Eastern Yar catchment etc.

- River Yar (Bembridge) (MS)
  - Scotchells Brook (R)
- Monktonmead Brook (Ryde) (MS)

Wootton Creek catchment etc.

- Wootton Creek (MS)
  - Chillingwood Brook
    - Deadman's Brook (L) (m)
  - Blackbridge Brook (R)
- Palmer's Brook (MS)

=== Coast of South East England ===
All rivers discharging into the English Channel and Straits of Dover between Hayling Island on the Hampshire/Sussex border and Foreness Point at the northeast corner of Kent. This section includes the entire coast of Sussex and the south and east coasts of Kent.

Minor coastal catchments

- Broad Rife (MS)
- Bremere Rife (MS)
- Pagham Rife (MS)
- Aldingbourne Rife (MS)
  - Barnham Rife (ref?)
  - Lidsey Rife (L)

Arun catchment

- River Arun (MS)
  - Ryebank Rife (R)
  - River Chilt (L)
    - River Stor (L)
  - River Rother (R)
    - Hammer Stream (L)
    - Tilmore Brook
    - Batt's Brook (R) (known upstream as Oakshott Stream)
  - unknown tributary (R)

Adur catchment

- River Adur (MS)
  - River Adur (east fork) (L)
    - Cowfold Brook (R)

Ouse catchment

- River Ouse, Sussex (MS)
  - Glynde Reach (L)
  - Bevern Stream
  - Iron River
  - Longford Stream (R)
  - River Uck (L)

Cuckmere catchment

- River Cuckmere (MS)

Pevensey Haven catchment

- Pevensey Haven (MS)
  - Langney Sewer (R)
    - Hurst Haven (L)

Wallers Haven catchment

- Waller's Haven (MS)
  - Nunningham Stream (R)
  - Ash Bourne (R)
    - Hugletts Stream (R)

Combe Haven catchment

- Combe Haven (MS)

Rother catchment

- River Rother (MS)
  - River Brede (R)
    - River Tillingham (L)
    - River Line
  - Potman's Heath Channel (L)
  - Hexden Channel (L)
  - River Dudwell (R)
  - River Limden (L)
  - Tide Brook (L)

Dour catchment

- River Dour (MS)

Stour catchment

- River Stour, Kent (MS)
  - North Stream (R)
  - Little Stour or Nailbourne (Rs)
    - Wingham River (R)
  - Great Stour (Ls)
    - River Wantsum (L)
    - East Stour (R)

== Eastern (North Sea) discharges from south-north ==
This section includes all of the rivers along England's east coast.

=== Thames Estuary ===
All rivers discharging into the Thames and Medway and their estuaries. This section includes the coast of Kent west of Foreness Point at the northeast corner of Kent and the south coast of Essex, west of Shoeburyness. But see also

Medway catchment

- River Medway (shares the Thames estuary) (MS)
  - East Malling Stream (L) ?ref
  - River Len (R)
  - Loose Stream (R) ?ref
  - Wateringbury Stream (L) ?ref
  - River Beult (R)
    - Lesser Teise (L)
  - River Teise (R)
    - River Bewl (R)
  - River Bourne (L)
  - River Eden (L)
  - Kent Water (L)

Thames catchment

- River Thames (In Oxford, the Thames is also known as the River Isis) (MS)
  - Bill Meroy Creek (L)
  - Mardyke (L)
  - River Darent (R)
    - River Cray (L)
      - Stanham River (R) (m)
      - River Shuttle (L)
        - Danson Stream (L)
        - Wyncham Stream (R)
          - Longlands Stream (R)
  - River Ingrebourne (tidal reach known as Rainham Creek) (L)
  - River Beam (L)
    - River Rom (Rs)
    - The Ravensbourne (Ls)
  - Wogebourne (Lower reach known as Crossway Canal) (R)
  - River Roding (tidal reach known as Barking Creek) (L)
  - Lea (tidal reach known as Bow Creek) (L)
    - The Hackney Brook (subterranean, and probably now diverted to the Thames) (R)
    - River Ching (L)
    - Pymmes Brook (R)
      - River Moselle (mostly subterranean, original tributary of Lee, now empties into Pymmes Brook) (R)
      - Salmons Brook (L)
    - Turkey Brook (R)
      - Small River Lea (L)
    - River Stort (L)
    - River Ash (L)
    - New River (artificial distributary, partly subterranean) (d) (R)
    - River Rib (L)
      - River Quin (L)
    - River Beane (L)
    - River Mimram (L)
  - River Ravensbourne (tidal reach known as Deptford Creek) (R)
    - River Quaggy (upper reaches known as Kyd Brook) (R)
      - Upper Kid Brooke (R)
      - Middle Kid Brooke (R)
      - Quaggy Hither Green (L)
      - Lower Kid Brooke (R)
      - Well Hall Stream (R)
      - Little Quaggy (R)
        - Fairy Hall Flow (L)
      - Grove Park Ditch (R)
      - Border Ditch (L)
      - Milk Street Ditch (R)
        - Halls Farm Ditch (L)
      - Petts Wood Ditch (R)
      - East Branch (R)
    - River Pool (L)
      - River Beck (Rs)
      - Chaffinch Brook (Ls)
    - Spring Brook (R)
  - River Peck (R)
  - River Neckinger (See also Subterranean rivers of London for this and the others marked 'subterranean' below) (R)
  - Walbrook (subterranean) (L)
  - River Fleet (subterranean, also known as the Holbourne) (L)
  - River Effra (subterranean) (R)
  - River Tyburn (subterranean) (L)
  - Falconbrook (subterranean) (R)
  - River Westbourne (subterranean) (L)
    - Tyburn Brook (subterranean) (L)
  - Counter's Creek (subterranean – tidal reach known as Chelsea Creek) (L)
  - River Wandle (R)
    - River Graveney
  - Beverley Brook (R)
    - Pyl Brook (R)
      - East Pyl Brook (R)
  - Stamford Brook (subterranean – tidal reach known as Hammersmith Creek) (L)
  - Bollo Brook (subterranean) (L)
  - River Brent (L)
    - Silk Stream (R)
    - Dollis Brook (Rs)
      - Folly Brook (R)
    - Mutton Brook (Ls)
  - Duke of Northumberland's River (L) (a distributary of the Colne)
  - River Crane (L)
    - Duke of Northumberland's River (d) (L)
    - Duke of Northumberland's River (R)
    - Yeading Brook (L)
  - Hogsmill River (R)
  - The Rythe (R)
  - River Mole (R)
    - River Ember (d) (R) (distributary and tributary)
  - Longford River (L) (a distributary of the Colne)
  - River Ash (L) (a distributary of the Colne)
  - River Wey (R)
    - Hoe Stream (R) (enters R. Wey as the Bourne)
    - River Tillingbourne (or Tilling Bourne) (R)
    - River Ock (R)
    - River Wey (North branch) (Ls)
    - River Wey (South branch) (Rs)
      - River Slea (L)
  - River Bourne, north branch (R)
  - River Bourne, south branch (R)
  - River Colne (L)
    - Wraysbury River (R) (distributary and tributary)
    - River Ash (d) (L)
    - Longford River (d) (L)
    - Duke of Northumberland's River (d) (L)
    - Wraysbury River (d) (R)
    - Frays River (L) (distributary and tributary)
      - River Pinn (L)
    - Colne Brook (d) (R)
    - River Misbourne (R)
    - Frays River (d) (R)
    - River Chess (R)
    - River Gade (R)
      - River Bulbourne (R)
    - River Ver (R)
  - Colne Brook (L) (distributary of the Colne)
  - Jubilee River (d) (L)
  - River Wye (L)
  - River Loddon (R)
    - St Patrick's Stream (d)(L) (also connects with Thames)
    - Twyford Brook (R)
    - Emm Brook (R)
    - Barkham Brook (R)
    - River Blackwater (or Blackwater River) (lower reach known as Broad Water)
      - River Whitewater (L)
        - River Hart (R)
    - Bow Brook (L)
    - River Lyde (R)
  - River Kennet (R)
    - Foudry Brook (R)
      - Burghfield Brook (L)
        - The Teg (L)
        - Lockram Brook (R)
    - Clayhill Brook
    - River Enborne (R)
    - River Lambourn (L)
    - River Dun (R)
    - River Og (L)
  - River Pang (R)
    - River Bourne (or 'The Bourne')(R)
    - River Roden ?ref
  - River Thame (L)
  - River Ock (R)
  - Hinksey Stream (R) (distributary of Seacourt Stream)
  - River Cherwell (L)
    - River Ray (L)
    - River Swere (R)
    - Sor Brook (R)
    - Highfurlong Brook (R)
  - Castle Mill Stream (L) (distributary of the Thames)
  - Bulstake Stream (R) (distributary of the Thames)
    - Seacourt Stream (R) (distributary of the Thames)
  - Duke's Cut (L) (artificial waterway connecting to the Oxford Canal)
  - River Evenlode (L)
    - River Glyme (L)
      - River Dorn (L)
  - River Windrush (L)
    - River Dikler (L)
      - River Eye (R)
  - River Cole (R)
  - River Leach (L)
  - River Coln (L)
  - River Ray(R)
  - Ampney Brook (L)
  - River Key (R)
  - River Churn (L) (this is notable as it is longer than the upstream portion of the Thames)
  - Derry Brook (R)
  - Swill Brook (R) (this is notable as it is larger than the Thames that it flows "into")
  - Flagham Brook (R)
  - Clanfield Stream

=== North of Thames Coast ===
All rivers discharging into the North Sea along the coast of East Anglia, including the counties of Essex (north and east of Shoeburyness), Suffolk and Norfolk as far as King's Lynn.

==== Crouch catchment ====
- River Crouch (MS)
  - River Roach (R)

==== Blackwater catchment ====
- River Blackwater (MS) (known as River Pant upstream)
  - River Chelmer (R)
    - River Ter (L)
  - River Brain (R)

==== Colne catchment ====
- River Colne (MS)
  - Roman River (R)

==== Stour catchment ====
- River Stour (MS)
  - River Brett (L)
  - River Box (L)
  - Chad Brook, Suffolk (L)
  - River Glem (L)

==== Orwell catchment ====
- River Orwell (MS) (known as River Gipping above tidal limit)

==== Minor coastal catchments ====
- River Deben (MS)
  - River Fynn (R)
- River Alde/River Ore (MS)
  - Butley River (R)
- Hundred River (south of Leiston) (MS) (m)
- Minsmere River (MS)
- River Blyth (MS)
- River Yox (MS)
- Hundred River / Latymere Dam (south of Kessingland) (MS)

==== Yare catchment ====
- River Yare (MS)
  - River Bure
    - River Thurne (L)
    - River Ant (L)
  - River Waveney (R)
    - River Dove (R)
  - River Chet (R)
  - Lackford Run (L)
  - River Wensum (L)
    - River Tud (R)
  - River Tas (R)
  - River Tiffey (R)
  - Blackwater River (R)

==== Coastal catchments ====
- River Glaven (MS)
- River Stiffkey (MS)
- River Burn (MS)
- Heacham River (MS)
- River Mun (MS)

==== Great Ouse catchment ====
- River Great Ouse (MS)
  - Babingley River (R)
  - Gaywood River (R)
  - River Nar (R)
  - River Wissey(R)
  - River Little Ouse or Little Ouse River (R)
    - River Thet (R)
    - The Black Bourn (L)
  - River Lark (R)
    - Lee Brook (R)
      - River Kennett (R)
    - River Linnet (L)
  - Soham Lode (River Snail upstream) (R)
  - River Cam (R)
    - Burwell Lode (R)
      - Wicken Lode (New River upstream) (R)
      - Reach Lode (L)
    - Swaffham Bulbeck Lode (R)
    - Bottisham Lode (R) (Quy Water upstream)
      - Little Wilbraham River (R)
    - River Rhee (Ls) (or River Cam)
      - Mill River (R)
    - River Granta (Rs) (or River Cam)
      - River Granta (R)
        - River Bourn (R)
  - River Kym (L) (River Til upstream)
  - River Ivel (R)
    - Ickwell Brook (L)
    - Potton Brook (R) (Millbridge Brook upstream)
    - River Flit (L)
      - River Hit (R)
    - Henlow Brook (L)
    - River Hiz (L)
      - Stondon Brook (L)
      - River Oughton (L)
      - River Purwell (R) (Ippollitts Brook upstream)
        - Ash Brook (R)
    - Pix Brook (L)
    - Cat Ditch (R)
  - River Ouzel or Lovat (R)
  - River Tove (L)
  - Padbury Brook (The Twins) (R)

=== Wash Estuary ===
All rivers discharging into the Wash together with those emptying into the North Sea along the Lincolnshire coast south of Cleethorpes.

Nene catchment

- River Nene (MS)
  - Lutton Leam (L)
  - South Holland Main Drain (L)
  - North Level Main Drain (L)
  - Willow Brook (L)
  - Harper's Brook (L)
  - River Ise (L)
  - River Nene, Brampton Arm (L)
  - Wootton Brook (R)

Welland catchment

- River Welland (MS)
  - Holbeach River(R)
    - Moulton River (L)
    - Whaplode River (L)
  - Risegate Eau (L)
  - River Glen (L)
    - Bourne Eau (L)
    - West Glen River (Rs)
    - East Glen River (Ls) (also known as River Eden)
  - Vernatt's Drain (L)
    - North Drove Drain (Ls)
    - South Drove Drain (Rs)
  - New River (R)
  - Car Dyke (Peterborough) (R)
  - Folly River (R)
  - Maxey Cut (R)
  - River Gwash (L)
  - River Chater (L)
  - Eye Brook (L)

The Haven catchment

- Boston Haven (MS)
  - South Forty-Foot Drain (R)
    - North Forty Foot Drain (L)
    - Hammond Beck (New Hammond Beck & Old Hammond Beck) (R)
    - Clay Dike (L)
    - Skerth Drain (L)
  - River Witham
    - River Slea (R)
    - Billinghay Skirth (R)
    - Catchwater Drain (L)
    - Metheringham Delph (R)
    - Nocton Delph (R)
    - Old River Witham (L)
      - Barlings Eau (L)
    - River Till (L)
    - Branston Delph (R)
    - River Brant (R)
    - Fossdyke Navigation
    - River Bain (L)
      - River Waring (L)
  - Witham Navigable Drains (L)
    - Maud Foster Drain
      - Stone Bridge Drain
        - West Fen Catchwater Drain
        - East Fen Catchwater Drain
    - Newham Drain
      - Castle Dike
    - Medlam Drain
      - West Fen Drain
    - Hobhole Drain
      - Cowbridge Drain
      - Bell Water Drain
      - Fodder Dike

Steeping catchment

- Steeping River (or Wainfleet Haven) (MS)
  - Cow Bank Drain (L)
  - Bell Water Drain (R)
  - River Lymn

Saltfleet catchment

- Saltfleet Haven (MS)
  - Great Eau (R)
    - Long Eau (L)
  - Mar Dike (R)
  - South Dike (L)

=== Humber Estuary ===
This section includes all rivers entering the Humber, defined as the estuary west of a line between Spurn Head and Cleethorpes. The Humber is often referred to as the River Humber though the name is unusual insofar as it is an entirely tidal stretch of water formed as the Rivers Ouse and Trent combine at Trent Falls.

Grainthorpe catchment

- Grainthorpe Haven (MS)
  - River Lud

Tetney Haven catchment

- Tetney Haven (MS)
  - Waithe Beck

Minor coastal catchments

- River Freshney (MS)
- East Halton Beck (MS)
- The Beck (MS)

Ancholme catchment

- New River Ancholme (MS)
  - West Drain (L)
  - Old River Ancholme (L)
  - River Rase (Rs)
  - River Ancholme (Ls)

Minor catchment

- Halton Drain (MS)

Trent catchment

- River Trent (MS)
  - Pauper's Drain (L)
    - River Torne (L)
  - River Eau (R)
  - River Idle (L)
    - River Ryton (L)
      - Oldcotes Dyke (L)
    - River Poulter (L)
    - River Maun (Ls)
    - River Meden (Rs)
  - River Devon (R)
    - River Smite (L)
      - River Whipling (R) (m)
  - River Greet (L)
  - River Leen (L)
    - Whyburn (R)
    - Farleys Brook (R)
  - River Erewash (L)
  - River Soar (R)
    - Kingston Brook (R)
    - Rothley Brook (L)
    - River Wreake (R) (known upstream as River Eye)
    - River Sence (R)
  - River Derwent (L)
    - River Ecclesbourne (R)
    - River Amber (L)
    - Bentley Brook (L) (near Matlock)
    - River Wye (R)
      - River Lathkill (R)
        - River Bradford (R)
    - River Noe (R)
      - Peakshole Water (R)
    - River Ashop (L) (enters Ladybower Reservoir)
      - River Alport
    - River Westend (R) (enters Derwent Reservoir)
  - River Dove (L)
    - Hilton Brook (L) (known as Sutton Brook upstream)
    - River Tean (R)
    - River Churnet (R)
    - Henmore Brook (L)
    - Bentley Brook, Bradbourne (L)
    - River Manifold (R)
      - River Hamps (R)
  - River Mease (R)
  - River Swarbourn (L)
  - River Tame (R)
    - Holbrook
    - River Anker (R)
      - River Sence (R)
        - Tweed River (L)
    - Bourne Brook (L) (known as Black Brook upstream)
    - River Blythe (R)
      - River Cole (R)
    - River Rea (R)
      - Bourne Brook, Birmingham
        - Chad Brook
  - River Blithe (L)
  - River Sow (R)
    - River Penk (R)
      - Whiston Brook (L)
    - Meece Brook (L)

Yorkshire Ouse catchment

- River Ouse (MS) (assumes name of River Ure upstream of Linton-on-Ouse)
  - River Don (R)
    - River Went (L)
      - Hessle Beck (Rs)
      - Went Beck (Ls)
        - Hardwick Beck (R)
    - River Dearne (L)
      - St Helen's Spring (L)
        - Ludwell Spring (L)
      - Knoll Beck (R)
      - Bulling Dike (R)
      - River Dove (R)
        - Brough Green Brook (L)
          - House Carr Dike (Rs)
            - Bagger Wood Dike (R)
            - Hollin Dike (R)
          - Dodworth Dike (Ls)
      - Small Bridge Dike (L)
        - Colls (L)
      - Cawthorne Dike (R)
        - Silkstone Beck (R)
          - Banks Bottom Dike (L)
          - Lindley Dike (L)
        - Tanyard Beck (R)
        - Daking Brook (R)
          - Jowett House Beck (L)
          - Spring Beck (L)
          - Rons Cliff Dike (Rs)
            - Cat Hill Clough (R)
            - Clough Dike (L)
              - Tanyard Brook (R)
          - Ochre Dike (Ls)
            - Cuckold Carr Dike (Rs)
              - Broad Wood Dike (L)
            - Flat Wood Dike (Ls)
      - Bently Brook (L)
        - Bently Dike (Ls)
        - Bank Wood (Rs)
          - Clay House Beck (L)
          - Little Dike (R)
          - Mill Beck (L)
            - Flockton Beck (Ls)
            - Mouse House Dike (Rs)
          - Out Lane Dike (R)
      - Toad Hole Dike (R)
      - Park Gate Dike (L)
        - Nineclogs Dike (L)
        - Baildon Dike (L)
      - Thorpe Dike (L)
      - Clough House Dike (R)
      - Munchcliffe Beck (R)
    - Hooton Brook (R)
      - Silverwood Brook (L)
      - Firsby Brook (L)
    - Collier Brook (L)
    - Roundwood Brook (L)
    - Dalton Brook (R)
    - River Rother (R)
      - Whiston Brook (R)
        - Pinch Mill Brook (R)
      - Ulley Brook (R)
      - Shirtcliff Brook (L)
      - Shire Brook (L)
      - Ochre Dike (L)
      - The Moss (L)
        - Robin Brook (L)
        - Sickle Brook (R)
      - Park Brook (R)
      - River Doe Lea (R)
        - Pools Brook (L)
        - Stockley Brook (R)
          - Strickle Brook (L)
      - River Whitting (L)
        - Barlow Brook (Rs)
          - Sud Brook (R)
          - Crowhole Brook (R)
          - Dunston Brook (R)
            - Pingle Dike (Rs)
            - Millthorpe Brook (Ls)
        - River Drone (Ls)
      - Tinker Sick (R)
      - Holme Brook (L)
        - River Hipper (R)
          - Millstone Sick (R)
      - Spital Brook (R)
      - Birdholme Brook (L)
      - Redleadmill Brook (L)
        - Tricket Brook (L)
      - Locko Brook (R)
    - Blackburn Brook (L)
      - Hartley Brook Dike (R)
        - Tongue Gutter (R)
    - River Sheaf (R)
      - Porter Brook (L)
      - Meers Brook (R)
      - Graves Park Beck (R)
      - Abbey Brook (R)
      - Limb Brook (L)
      - Totley Brook (Rs)
      - Old Hay Brook (Ls)
        - Redcar Brook (L)
        - Blacka Dike (R)
    - River Loxley (R)
      - River Rivelin (R)
        - Black Brook (R)
        - Allen Sike (R)
        - Wyming Brook (R)
        - Hollow Meadows Brook (L)
        - Trout Sike (L)
      - Storrs Brook (R)
      - Sykehouse Brook (R)
      - Ughill Brook (R)
        - Wet Shaw Dike (L)
      - Rocher End Brook (L)
      - Sick Brook (L)
      - Emlin Dike (R)
    - Sough Dike (R)
    - Coumes Brook (R)
    - Tinker Brook (R)
    - Ewden Beck (R)
      - Rayon Clough (R)
      - Ancar Brook (R)
      - Canyards Brook (R)
      - Wood Brook (L)
      - Lee Lane Dike (R)
      - Allas Lane Dike (R)
      - Park Brook (R)
      - Salt Spring Beck (L)
    - River Little Don (or Little Don River) (R)
      - Allen Croft Brook (R)
      - New Hall Brook (R)
      - Cote Field Beck (L)
        - Spring Brook (L)
      - Knoll Brook (R)
      - Small Clough (L)
      - Hagg Brook (R)
    - Dean Brook (R)
    - Castle Dike (R)
    - Coal Pit Dike (R)
    - Scout Dike (L)
  - River Aire (R)
    - River Calder (R)
      - Willowbridge Beck (becomes Carr Beck at Whitwood) (R)
      - Ashfield Beck (R)
        - Wain Dike Beck (R)
          - Sewerbridge Beck (R)
      - Navigation Beck (L)
      - Oakenshaw Beck (R)
      - Ings Beck (L)
        - Balne Beck (L)
          - Snow Hill Beck (L)
          - Foster Ford Beck (becomes Carr Gate Beck at Carr Gate) (L)
        - Alverthorpe Beck (becomes Hey Beck upstream) (L)
          - Baghill Beck (L)
          - Woodkirk Beck (L)
      - Owler Beck (becomes Buschliff Beck at Newmillerdam, and Bleakley Dike upstream) (R)
        - Lawns Dike (L)
        - Haw Park Beck (L)
      - Blacker Beck (R)
        - Dennington Beck (R)
          - Bullcliff Beck (L)
        - North Wood Beck (R)
      - Pits Beck (R)
      - Smithy Brook (R)
        - Coxley Beck (R)
        - Howroyd Beck (L)
          - Fallhouse Beck (R)
        - Briestfield Beck (L)
      - Gilbert Dike (L)
      - Pildacre Mill Beck (L)
      - Chickenley Beck (L)
      - Howley Beck (L)
        - Lady Ann Dike (L)
      - River Spen (L)
        - Canker Dike (R)
        - Finching Dike (R)
        - Lands Beck (becomes Clough Beck upstream) (R)
          - Spa Pump Beck (R)
        - Blacup Beck (R)
          - Oldfield Beck (R)
      - Valance Beck (becomes Covey Clough upstream) (R)
        - Liley Clough (R)
      - Nun Brook (L)
      - River Colne (R)
        - Lees Beck (Becomes Fenay Beck upstream, then Beldon Brook) (R)
          - Ox Field Beck (becomes Rods Beck near Gawthorpe) (R)
          - Rushfield Dike (becomes Lumb Dike near Castle Hill (L)
          - Beldon Brook (Rs)
          - Woodsome Dike (becomes Thunder Bridge Dike at Thunder Bridge (L)
            - Range Dike (L)
            - Car Dike (Ls)
              - Clough Dike (Ls)
              - Town Moor Dike (Rs)
            - Shepley Dike (Rs)
              - Stone Wood Dike (L)
        - Blackhouse Dike (becomes Allison Dike upstream) (L)
        - Grimescar Dike (L)
        - Clayton Dike (L)
        - Penny Spring Beck (R)
          - Benholmley Beck (R)
        - Longley Hall Beck (becomes Squirrel Ditch, then Channel Dike near Longley (R)
        - River Holme (R)
          - Dean Clough (L)
          - Mag Brook (L)
            - Meltham Dike (R)
          - New Mill Dike (R)
          - River Ribble (R)
          - Black Sike Dike (L)
          - Dobb Dike (R)
        - Longwood Brook (L)
          - Clay Wood Brook (R)
        - Bradley Brook (R)
        - Merrydale Clough (L)
        - Drop Clough (L)
      - Bradley Park Dike (R)
        - Deep Dike (R)
      - Clifton Beck (becomes Wyke Beck at Wyke) (L)
        - Hoyle House Beck (R)
        - Bottom Hall Beck (R)
          - Hellilwell Syke (becomes Syke Wells upstream) (Rs)
          - Coley Beck (Ls)
            - Wood Fall Beck (L)
        - Royads Hall Beck (R)
          - Blackshaw Beck (L)
      - Red Beck (becomes Shibden Brook at Shibden) (L)
        - Dixon Clough (R)
        - Jum Hole Beck (L)
          - Lumb Brook (L)
      - Black Brook (R)
        - Holywell Brook (R)
        - Barsey Clough (L)
        - Sandyfoot Clough (L)
        - Barkisland Clough (L)
        - Bottomeley Clough (L)
        - Red Lane Dike (R)
      - Hebble Brook (L)
        - Ovenden Brook (becomes Strines Beck at Holmfield) (L)
        - Clough Bank Beck (R)
        - Cars Beck (R)
          - Middle Grain Beck (L)
      - River Ryburn (R)
      - Luddenden Brook (L)
      - Cragg Brook (R)
        - Withens Clough (L)
        - Turvin Clough (R)
      - Hebden Beck (L)
        - Bridge Clough (becomes Crimsworth Dean Beck upstream) (L)
          - Hardidunt Clough (R)
          - Paddock Beck (R)
          - Roms Clough (L)
        - Graining Water (R)
      - Colden Water (L)
      - Beaumont Clough (R)
      - Daisy Bank Clough (L)
      - Lumbutts Clough (R)
      - Scaitcliffe Clough (R)
      - Hudson Clough (L)
        - Redmires Water (L)
      - Wittonstall Clough (L)
        - Dry Syke
    - Oulton Beck (R)
      - West Beck (L)
        - Throstle Carr Beck (L)
      - Carlton Beck
    - Fleakingley Beck (L)
    - Wyke Beck (L)
    - Oil Mill Beck (L)
      - Moseley Beck
        - Scotland Beck (R)
        - Bramhope Beck (L)
    - Begley Beck (R)
    - Gill Beck (L)
    - Guiseley Beck (L)
      - Yeadon Gill (L)
    - Gill Beck (L)
      - Jum Beck (L)
      - Black Beck
        - Middle Beck (R)
          - Horncliff Beck (R)
    - Bradford Beck (R)
      - Middle Brook
        - Chellow Dean Beck (L)
        - Bull Greave Beck (R)
      - Clayton Beck (R)
      - Pitty Beck (L)
    - Loadpit Beck (L)
      - Gloveshaw Beck (L)
      - Eldwick Beck
    - Little Beck (L)
    - Cottingley Beck (R)
    - Harden Beck (R)
      - Mytholme Beck (R)
        - Wilsden Beck
      - Hallas Beck
        - Cow House Beck (L)
      - Hewenden Beck
        - Sough Dike (R)
        - Milking Hole Beck (L)
        - Denholme Beck (R)
          - Carperley Beck (L)
            - Stubden Beck (R)
    - Morton Beck (L)
      - Fenny Shaw Beck (L)
      - Brad Beck
    - How Beck (L)
    - River Worth (R)
      - North Beck (L)
        - Butter Clough (L)
        - Todley Clough (L)
        - Newsholme Beck (R)
          - Nook Beck
        - Dean Beck
          - Far Slippery Beck (L)
            - Cinder Sike (L)
            - Slatesden Clough (L)
            - Old Ibber Dike (R)
          - Morkin Beck (L)
            - Blue Scar Beck (R)
      - Bridgehouse Beck (R)
        - Moorhouse Beck (L)
          - Hoyle Syke (L)
          - Dunkirk Beck (L)
          - Rag Clough Beck (R)
        - Leeming Water
          - Nan Scar Beck (L)
      - Sladen Beck (R)
        - Harbour Hole (R)
        - South Dean Beck
          - Crumber Dike (R)
            - Black Dike (L)
          - Rough Dike (R)
    - Silsden Beck (L)
    - Steeton Beck (R)
    - Eastburn Beck (R)
      - Sutton Beck (R)
      - Leys Beck (L)
        - Lothersdale Beck (Ls)
        - Surgill Beck (Rs)
      - Ickornshaw Beck
        - Gill Beck (L)
          - Lane House Beck (L)
            - Stone Head Beck
              - Black Scars Beck (R)
        - Gibb Syke (R)
        - Summer House Beck (R)
          - Lumb Head Beck (Ls)
            - Cowloughton Clough (L)
              - High End Lowe Spring (L)
          - Dean Hole Clough (Rs)
            - Dean Brow Beck (R)
              - Foul Dike (L)
            - Andrew Gutter (R)
    - Eller Beck (L)
      - Haw Beck (R)
        - Embsay Beck (R)
        - Kempley Beck (R)
          - Rowton Beck
            - Heugh Gill
              - Rams Gill
        - Water Lane Beck (R)
      - Owlet House Beck (R)
      - Red Gill (L)
      - Sandy Beck (R)
    - Carla Beck (R)
    - Catlow Gill (R)
    - Denindale Beck (R)
    - Denbers Dike (R)
      - Eller Gill (L)
    - Broughton Beck (R)
      - Crickle Beck (L)
        - Langber Beck (R)
          - Carr Beck
            - Gill Syke
      - Thornton Beck
        - Elslack Beck (R)
        - Brown House Beck
          - Earby Beck
            - Wentcliff Brook
              - Hodge Syke (L)
    - Eshton Beck (L)
      - Rom Side Beck (L)
      - Flasby Beck (L)
        - Mires Beck (R)
        - Hetton Beck (L)
          - Calton Gill Beck (L)
            - Washfold Beck (R)
          - Town End Beck (Ls)
          - Skirse Gill Beck (Rs)
            - Fleets Beck (L)
              - Ings Beck (L)
                - Town Beck
      - Winterburn Beck
        - Dog Kennel Gill (R)
        - Moor Gill (R)
          - Calton Moor Syke (L)
        - Newton Bank Gill (R)
          - Smither Gill (L)
        - Way Gill (R)
          - Jeffreys Gill (R)
        - Whetstone Gill (R)
          - Ray Gill (L)
        - Long Gill Beck (L)
        - Lainger Beck (L)
    - Crosber Beck (R)
      - Newton Beck
        - High Ground Beck (L)
        - Hulber Beck (L)
    - Rowton Beck (R)
    - Gill Syke (R)
    - Otterburn Beck (R)
      - Dowber Syke (L)
      - Crane Field Beck (R)
        - Causeway Syke (L)
      - Crook Beck (R)
      - Duersdale Syke (L)
      - Ingle Beck (L)
      - Shears Gill Syke (L)
    - Tern Dike (L)
      - Calton Gill Syke
    - Foss Gill (L)
      - Calton Spouts (L)
        - High Field Syke (Rs)
        - High Close Syke (Ls)
    - Crook Syke (L)
    - Kirkby Beck (R)
      - Summer Gill Syke (Ls)
      - Crook Syke (Rs)
        - Grains Beck (L)
    - Malham Beck (L)
      - Granny Gill (L)
      - Gordale Beck (L)
        - Cow Close Syke (L)
        - Hanlith Gill Syke (L)
          - Hell Gill Syke (R)
        - Wye Gill Sike (L)
      - Tanpits Beck (R)
        - Tranlands Beck
          - Sell Gill (L)
  - River Derwent (L)
    - The Beck (becomes Bielby Beck at Bielby) (L)
      - Blackfoss Beck (R)
      - Missick Beck (becomes Hayton Beck at Hayton, Burnby Beck at Burnby, Nunburnholme Beck at Nunburnholme, and The Washdike at Warter) (Ls)
        - West Beck (R)
      - Pocklington Beck (Rs)
        - Millington Beck (becomes Ridings Beck upstream of Millington) (L)
          - Whitekeld Beck (L)
    - Cram Beck (R)
      - Moorhouse Beck (Rs)
        - Carrmire Beck (L)
      - Mill Hills Beck (Ls)
        - New River (R)
    - Howl Beck (L)
      - Mill Beck (R)
        - Gilder Beck (L)
    - Menethorpe Beck (becomes Thornthorpe Beck near Langton, and Mill Beck near Birdsall) (L)
      - Rowmire Beck (R)
    - Priorpot Beck (L)
    - River Rye (R)
      - Costa Beck (L)
        - Ackland Beck (R)
        - Pickering Beck (L)
          - Levisham Beck (L)
          - Green Raygate Spring (R)
          - Raindale Beck (R)
            - Stape Beck (R)
          - Scarfhill Beck (R)
          - Sole Beck (R)
          - Havern Beck (L)
      - River Seven (L)
        - Catter Beck (becomes Hutton Beck upstream) (R)
          - Fairy Call Beck (becomes Loskey Beck upstream) (L)
          - Rudland Beck (R)
        - Keld Beck (R)
        - Cropton Beck (becomes Sutherland Beck upstream) (L)
          - Little Beck (L)
        - Lastingham Beck (R)
          - Ings Beck (becomes Ellers Beck, then Hole Beck upstream) (R)
          - Grain Beck (Ls)
          - Tranmire Beck (Rs)
        - Hartoft Beck (L)
          - Muffles Dike (L)
          - Priest's Sike Beck (L)
          - Hamer Beck (Rs)
          - Crook Beck (Ls)
        - North Gill (L)
          - West Gill (R)
        - Thorgill Head (R)
        - Cold Beck (R)
        - Reeking Gill (L)
      - River Dove (L)
        - Hodge Beck (R)
          - Stonely Woods Beck (L)
          - Cold Beck (R)
          - Rudland Beck (L)
          - Great Runnell (R)
          - Ouse Gill (L)
          - Little Runnell (R)
          - Cow Slack (R)
          - Shaw Beck (L)
        - Shortsha Beck (L)
        - Low Lane Wath (R)
          - Yealand Rigg Slack (R)
          - Harland Beck (L)
        - Lapa Green Dike (L)
        - Oak Beck (L)
        - Gill Beck (L)
      - White Beck (R)
      - Borough Beck (L)
        - Etton Gill (R)
      - Cadell (R)
      - River Seph (L)
        - Todhill Beck (L)
        - Ledge Beck (L)
        - Bildale Beck (Ls)
        - Raisdale Beck (Rs)
      - Ladhill Beck (L)
    - Welldale Beck (R)
    - Brompton Beck (R)
    - Ruston Beck (R)
    - River Hertford (L)
    - Lowdales Beck (L)
      - Kirk Beck (Ls)
        - Crossdales Beck (L)
      - Sow Beck (becomes Troutsdale Beck upstream) (R)
        - Freeze Gill (L)
        - Smithy Beck (L)
      - White Beck (R)
        - Grime Gill (R)
        - Black Beck (L)
          - Hipperley Beck (L)
          - Crosscliff Beck (R)
            - Yarna Beck (L)
            - Smallwood Beck (L)
    - Harwood Dale Beck (becomes Brown Rigg Beck upstream) (L)
      - Keas Beck (L)
        - West Syme (Ls)
        - Broadlands Beck (Rs)
      - Castle Beck (L)
        - Black Sike (L)
      - Bloody Beck (R)
      - Helwath Beck (L)
    - Barley Carr Dike (R)
    - Woof Howe Grain (R)
    - Tim Wash Slack (L)
  - Selby Dam (R)
    - Cockret Dike (L)
      - Holmes Dike (L)
        - Black Fen (R)
    - Town Dike (R)
    - Dutch Man's Dike (L)
  - Marsh Dike (L)
    - Angram Dike (L)
    - Old Ings Dike (R)
  - Clough Dike (R)
  - Dam Dike (L)
    - Sike Dike (R)
    - Parkhill Dike (R)
    - Heron Dike (R)
    - Holmes Dike (L)
  - River Wharfe (R)
    - The Foss (L)
      - Catterton Beck (becomes Dam Dike downstream of Healugh) (L)
        - Healaugh Beck (L)
        - Long Lane Dike (R)
    - Dorts Dike (R)
    - Cock Mouth (becomes Cock Beck at Stutton) (R)
      - Hackenby Dike (R)
      - Potterton Beck (L)
        - Rake Beck (L)
      - Longlane Beck (L)
      - Carr Beck (L)
      - Grimes Dike (R)
    - Hay Dike (L)
    - Firgreen Beck (R)
      - Carr Beck (becomes Bramham Beck at Bramham, Miller Beck at Wothersome, and Thorner Beck at Thorner) (R)
        - Mill Beck (R)
    - Collingham Beck (becomes Keswick Beck upstream of Collingham (R)
      - Bardsey Beck (Rs)
        - Scarcroft Beck (R)
      - Gill Beck (Ls)
        - Grace Beck (L)
        - Collier Beck (R)
    - Baffle Beck (L)
    - Keswick Beck (L)
    - Stank Beck (becomes Eccup Beck upstream of Fish Pond) (R)
      - Stub House Beck (L)
      - Sturdy Beck (R)
      - Eller-car-nook Beck (R)
    - Weeton Beck (L)
    - Riffa Beck (L)
      - West Beck (Rs)
      - East Beck (Ls)
    - Holbeck (R)
    - River Washburn (L)
      - Holbeck (L)
      - Hensan's Beck (L)
      - Greystone Beck (L)
      - Gill Beck (L)
      - Snowden Beck (R)
      - Timble Gill Beck (R)
        - Dick's Beck (R)
      - Brat Gill Beck (L)
        - Fore Beck (R)
      - Spinksburn Beck (L)
        - Dynas Beck (becomes Long Slack upstream) (L)
        - Little Slack (L)
      - Thackray Beck (becomes Gill Beck upstream) (R)
        - Long Dike (R)
        - Stainforth Gill (Rs)
          - Gawk Hall Gill (L)
        - Sun Bank Gill (Ls)
          - Churn Holes Dike (R)
      - Hall Beck (R)
        - Cote Hill Dike (R)
          - Cock Lakes (L)
        - Colls (R)
        - Bothams Well (R)
        - Black Dike (R)
      - Hare Carr Gill (L)
      - Redshaw Gill Beck (R)
        - Nun Ings Dike (R)
        - Ramsgill Beck (L)
      - Slade Dike (L)
      - Bank Dike (R)
      - Capelshaw Beck (R)
        - Green Sike (L)
          - Slush Dike (R)
          - Crackling Sike (L)
      - Peatman Sike (L)
      - Harden Gill Beck (R)
        - Black Dike (R)
    - Carr Banks Gill (becomes Hol Beck upstream) (L)
    - Mickle Ing Beck (R)
      - Gill Beck (R)
        - Mire Beck (L)
          - Matthew Dike (L)
      - Carr Beck (R)
        - Dry Beck (R)
    - Dean Beck (L)
    - Wood Head Beck (becomes Coldstone Beck upstream) (R)
    - Mill Dam Beck (L)
    - East Beck (L)
    - West Beck (L)
    - Hundwith Beck (L)
      - Scales Gill (L)
    - Hepper Carr Beck (L)
      - Skirfa Beck (R)
      - Worm Beck (L)
    - Bow Beck (L)
      - Listers Dub (R)
      - Whinthorn Gill (L)
        - Dearncomb Beck (L)
      - Delves Beck (R)
        - Dryas Dike (L)
      - Middle Gill (L)
      - Foldshaw Gill (Rs)
      - Loftshaw Gill (Ls)
    - Backstone Beck (R)
    - Spicey Gill (R)
    - Old Wives Gill (L)
    - Black Beck (R)
    - Rams Gill (R)
    - Dean Beck (L)
      - Ellishaw Beck (L)
    - Town Beck (R)
    - West Hall Beck (L)
    - Lathe House Beck (L)
    - Thurstones Beck (L)
    - Kex Beck (L)
      - Bowers Dike (L)
        - Smeltings Sike (L)
      - Swinesleds Dike (R)
      - Howgill Sike (L)
      - Priespill Gill (R)
      - Lumb Beck (R)
        - Hey Shaw Slack (R)
      - Badger Gill Beck (R)
        - David's Dike (L)
      - Pace Gate Beck (R)
        - Far Dike (R)
        - Old Intake Beck (L)
        - Black Sike (R)
      - Green Shaw Dike (L)
      - Mossy Sikes Dike (L)
    - Stead Dike (L)
    - Dicken Dike (L)
    - Hollin Beck (R)
    - Barden Beck (R)
    - Gill Beck (R)
    - Fir Beck (L)
      - How Beck (L)
    - River Dibb (also known as Barben Beck downstream) (L)
    - Starton Beck (R)
      - Hesker Gill (R)
      - Coll (L)
    - Hebden Beck (L)
    - Howgill Beck (L)
    - Thorpe Beck (R)
    - Isingdale Beck (L)
    - Linton Beck (R)
      - Ings Beck (L)
        - Grysedale Beck (R)
      - Stanghill Beck (R)
      - Crook Beck (L)
        - Swinden Beck (L)
    - River Skirfare (R)
      - Cowside Beck (R)
        - Darnbrook Beck (L)
        - Thoragill Beck (L)
        - Tennant Gill (L)
      - Bown Scar Beck (R)
      - Crystal Beck (L)
      - Potts Beck (L)
      - Helsden Beck (R)
        - Pen-y-ghent Gill (L)
          - Lockey Beck (L)
      - Newshot Gill (L)
      - Halton Gill Beck (L)
      - Foxup Beck (Rs)
      - Cosh Beck (Ls)
    - Kettlewell Beck (L)
    - Buckden Beck (L)
    - Gill Beck (R)
    - Bouther Gill (R)
    - Hagg Beck (R)
    - Hagg Gill (R)
    - Deepdale Gill (L)
    - Oughtershaw Beck (Ls)
    - Green Field Beck (Rs)
  - Scaffold Dike (R)
    - South Fields Dike (L)
  - Wood Dike (L)
  - Thomas Dike (R)
  - Howden Dike (L)
    - Germany Beck (L)
  - River Foss (L)
    - Tang Hall Beck (L)
      - Osbaldwick Beck (L)
      - Old Foss Beck (L)
    - South Beck (L)
    - Goland Dike (R)
    - Howl Beck (L)
    - Whitecarr Beck (R)
      - Mousecarrs Strome (L)
    - Farlington Beck (L)
    - St. John's Well (R)
    - Brandsby Beck (L)
    - Ellers Beck (R)
  - Holgate Beck (R)
  - Burtree Dam (L)
  - Hurns Gutter (L)
  - Wadeland Dike (L)
  - River Nidd (R)
    - Hole Beck (R)
    - Pool Beck (L)
      - Caskill Beck (Rs)
      - Score Ray Beck (Ls)
    - Kirk Hammerton Beck (L)
    - Fleet Beck (becomes Fleet Beck upstream of Tockwith) (R)
      - Sike Beck (R)
        - Redwith Dike (L)
    - River Crimple (or Crimple Beck) (R)
      - Stockeld Beck (R)
      - Park Beck (R)
      - Aketon Beck (R)
      - Horse Pond Beck (R)
      - Star Beck (L)
        - Rud Beck (R)
      - Hookstone Beck (L)
      - Stone Rings Beck (L)
      - Clark Beck (L)
      - Horn Beck (becomes Nor Beck upstream) (R)
    - The Rampart (L)
    - Frogmire Dike (L)
    - Holbeck (R)
    - Bilton Beck (R)
    - Oak Beck (R)
      - Grain Beck (L)
    - Newton Beck (L)
      - Cayton Beck (L)
    - Ripley Beck (becomes Thornton Beck upstream of Ripley Lake) (L)
      - Colber Beck (L)
      - Brimham Beck (Rs)
      - Shaw Beck (Ls)
    - Cockhill Beck (R)
    - Tang Beck (R)
      - Barse Beck (R)
    - Lolly Bog Dike (R)
    - Fringill Dike (becomes Heck Gill upstream) (R)
    - Darley Beck (becomes Padside Beck upstream of Thornthwaite, then Fall Beck) (R)
      - Scot Beck (R)
        - Red Sike (L)
      - Gin Dike (R)
      - Black Sike (L)
    - Clough Gill (L)
    - Ford (R)
    - Loftshaw Gill (R)
    - Fell Beck (L)
      - Black Dike (L)
        - Pencil Dike (L)
      - Near Beck (Rs)
      - Far Beck (Ls)
        - Black Dike (L)
        - Beck Head (L)
    - Byril Beck (L)
    - Fosse Gill (R)
      - Middle Tongue Dike (R)
        - Hollin Close Dike (L)
        - Water Gate Beck (L)
    - Rash Dike (R)
    - Foster Beck (R)
    - Dauber Gill (L)
      - Black Dike (L)
      - Yew Sike (L)
    - How Stean Beck (L)
      - Armathwaite Gill (L)
        - Runscoe Beck (L)
    - Intake Gill (R)
    - Ford (R)
    - How Gill (R)
    - Ford Limely Gill (R)
    - Rough Close Gill (L)
    - Mere Dike (L)
    - Foggyshaw Gill (R)
    - Turnacar Gill (L)
    - Maddering Gill (R)
    - Thornet Gill (L)
    - Woo Gill (L)
      - Twizing Gill (L)
    - Stone Beck (R)
  - Mill Sike (R)
  - River Kyle (L)
    - Shorn Dike (R)
      - Sandwath Beck (R)
    - New Parks Beck (L)
      - Huby Burn (R)
        - Alcar Beck (L)
      - Blackrein Beck (L)
    - Whitecarr Ings Beck (L)
    - Derrings Beck (Rs)
      - Sun Beck (L)
        - Stanks Beck (L)
    - Carle Beck (Ls)
      - Alne Beck (Rs)
        - Shires Beck (R)
          - Hawkhills Beck (L)
      - Wrang Beck (Ls)
  - Blytham Beck (R)
    - Sally Close Beck (L)
  - Ouse Gill Beck (R)
  - Caulkhill Beck (R)
  - Holbecks (R)
  - River Swale (L)
    - Myston Pasture Stell (R)
    - Cundall Beck (R)
      - Mother Sike (R)
        - Lingham Goit (R)
    - Crakehill Beck (becomes Birdforth Beck upstream) (L)
      - The Stell (Rs)
      - Ings Beck (becomes Elphin Beck upstream) (Ls)
        - Twattleton Beck (R)
          - Boars Gill (L)
          - Greens Beck (becomes Wakendale Beck upstream) (Rs)
            - Bye Wash (L)
          - Mill Beck (becomes Long Beck upstream of Fish Pond) (Ls)
            - Blind Side Gill (R)
            - Ravens Gill (R)
    - Cod Beck (L)
      - Great Pasture Beck (R)
        - Thacker Beck (L)
      - Willow Beck (becomes Isle Beck, Thirkleby Beck, Balk Beck, Sutton Beck, Thirly Beck, then Gurtof Beck upstream) (L)
        - Old Beck (L)
        - Moor Stell (R)
        - Carr Dike (L)
          - Hemp Dike (Rs)
          - Croft Dike (Ls)
        - Hood Beck (L)
        - Mire Beck (L)
      - Paradise Beck (becomes Fisher Beck upstream) (L)
      - Dugdale Beck (R)
      - Moor Lane Stell (L)
      - Whitelass Beck (L)
      - Spital Beck (L)
      - Broad Beck (becomes Cowesby Beck at Borrowby, then Old Beck upstream) (L)
      - Howl Beck (L)
        - Wash Beck (L)
      - Oakdale Beck (L)
        - Slape Stones Beck (R)
        - Doldrum Gill (L)
      - Crabdale Beck (L)
    - Old Sike (L)
    - Howe Beck (becomes Ainderby Beck upstream) (R)
      - Sikes Beck (R)
    - Foss Sike Stell (L)
    - River Wiske (L)
      - Sike Stell (L)
        - Hagberry Stell (Rs)
        - Dow Dike Stell (Ls)
          - Carr Stell (R)
            - Moor Stell (R)
      - Willow Beck (becomes Brompton Beck at Brompton, then Winton Beck downstream of Winton) (L)
      - The Stell (R)
    - Healam Beck (R)
      - Pickhill Beck (becomes Holme Beck upstream) (R)
      - Old Stell (L)
      - Lady Well (L)
        - Ings Goit (R)
    - The Stell (R)
    - How Beck (L)
      - How Beck Stell (L)
    - Dam Dike (R)
    - Bedale Beck (becomes Crakehall Beck at Crakehall) (R)
      - Scruton Stell (L)
      - Firby Beck (R)
        - Burtree Dike (R)
        - Hol Beck (R)
        - Burrill Beck (becomes Cray Fish Beck upstream) (L)
      - Rand Beck (R)
      - Scurf Beck (L)
        - Wassick Beck (R)
        - Bowbridge Beck (becomes Claypits Beck upstream) (R)
      - Burton Beck (Rs)
        - Newton Gill (R)
        - Akebar Gill (L)
        - Ruswick Gill (becomes Moor Beck upstream) (R)
        - Spruce Gill (R)
        - Sun Beck (R)
      - Brompton Beck (becomes Hunton Beck, then Garriston Beck upstream) (Ls)
    - Common Stell (becomes Stonebridge Stell, then Fence Dike upstream) (R)
    - New Dike (L)
    - Mill Beck (L)
      - North Beck (L)
    - Mill Beck (R)
    - Rawcar Beck (L)
    - Kiplin Beck (becomes Bolton Beck at Bolton-on-Swale, Scorton Beck at Scorton, Moulton Beck at Moulton, Kirk Beck, then Cow Lane Beck) (L)
      - Bridgeworth Beck (R)
      - Howl Beck (L)
      - Ings Beck (R)
      - Five Hills Beck (R)
    - Fiddale Beck (R)
    - Catterick Beck (becomes Tunstall Beck at Tunstall) (R)
      - Thieves Gill (L)
    - Skeeby Beck (becomes Gilling Beck, Hartforth Beck, Holme Beck, then Dalton Beck upstream) (L)
      - Crashfish Beck (R)
      - Carr Beck (L)
      - Catchwater Stell (L)
      - Leadmill Gill Beck (becomes Smelt Mill Beck, then Springs Beck upstream) (R)
      - Stalwath Beck (L)
        - Browson Beck (becomes Cottonmill Beck upstream) (L)
        - Sprent Beck (L)
          - Sker Burn (L)
    - Colburn Beck (becomes Cottages Beck, then Leadmill Beck upstream) (R)
      - Risedale Beck (R)
    - Sand Beck (R)
      - Throstle Gill (becomes Badger Beck upstream) (R)
      - Coal Gill (Rs)
      - Cross Gill (Ls)
    - Church Gill (R)
    - Feldom Gill (L)
    - Marske Beck (L)
      - Holgate Beck (Rs)
        - Padley Beck (R)
        - Skegdale Beck (R)
      - Throstle Gill (becomes Rake Beck upstream) (Ls)
        - Thrin Gill (R)
    - Cogdale Beck (R)
    - Arkle Beck (L)
    - Barney Beck (L)
    - Whitsundale Beck (L)
    - Great Sleddale Beck (Rs)
    - Birkdale Beck (Ls)
  - Nell Beck (L)
  - River Tutt (becomes Occaney Beck upstream of Occaney) (R)
    - Tanner Beck (R)
    - Shaw Beck (R)
      - Jum Well Beck (L)
        - Percy Beck (R)
      - Ware End Beck (R)
    - Scarr Beck (R)
  - Holbeck (becomes Robert Beck at Copgrove, Stainley Beck at South Stainley, and Markington Beck upstream of Markinton) (R)
    - Hebden Beck (R)
  - Demains Beck (R)
  - River Skell (R)
    - River Laver (L)
      - Kex Beck (L)
        - Crimble Dale Beck (L)
        - Wreaks Beck (R)
      - Holborn Beck (R)
        - Rowan Tree Gill (L)
      - Carlesmoor Beck (L)
        - Stock Beck (L)
          - Foul Sike (L)
        - Hawset Dike (R)
        - Fortress Dike (R)
        - Black Dike (L)
      - Coal Dike (R)
      - North Gill Beck (Ls)
        - Bogs Dike (R)
        - Hambleton Dike (R)
      - South Gill Beck (Rs)
        - Black Dike (R)
    - Gill Beck (R)
    - Scale Beck (R)
    - Redmires Beck (L)
    - Grain Beck (L)
    - Skell Beck (R)
  - Nunwick Beck (L)
    - Norton Beck (L)
      - Hallikeld Stell (L)
      - Salmist Beck (L)
      - Wath Beck (L)
      - The Stell (Rs)
      - Upsland Stell (Ls)
  - Light Water (R)
  - Black Robin Beck (L)
  - River Burn (R)
    - Swinney Beck (L)
      - Little Swinney Beck (R)
    - Den Beck (R)
      - Eller Beck (L)
    - Sole Beck (R)
    - Pott Beck (R)
      - Agill Beck (R)
        - Birky Sike (R)
          - Rowten Sike (L)
            - Arnagill Beck (L)
              - Writhen Stone Dike (L)
      - Slip Wath Gill (L)
      - Flout Slack (R)
      - Deep Gill (R)
    - Spruce Gill Beck (R)
    - Gir Beck (L)
    - Birk Gill Beck (becomes Barnley Beck upstream) (L)
      - Brown Beck (L)
      - Backstone Gill (L)
      - Scale Gill (L)
      - Fuley Gill (L)
      - Slip Wath (L)
    - House Gill
    - Slee House Gill (L)
    - Thorny Grane Gill (R)
    - Long Gill (L)
      - Backstone Gill (L)
      - Little Haw Brook (L)
    - Beldin Gill (L)
    - Steel House Gill (L)
  - Breoad Beck (R)
  - Deep Gill Beck (R)
  - Parson's Beck (R)
  - Cold Keld's Beck (R)
  - River Cover (R)
    - Green Beck (L)
    - Caldbergh Gill (R)
      - Ulfer's Gill (L)
    - Little Gill (R)
    - Humph Gill (R)
    - Thorow Gill (R)
    - Griff (L)
    - Great Gill (R)
      - Cullen Gill (L)
        - Sandy Dike (R)
      - Lead Up Gill (Rs)
        - Graystone Gill (R)
        - Birk Gill (R)
          - Rowan Tree Gill (R)
      - Tunstall Gill (Ls)
  - Harmby Beck (L)
    - Spennithorne Beck (L)
      - Limebottom Beck (R)
  - Wrang Beck (becomes Capple Bank Beck upstream) (R)
  - Wensley Brook (L)
  - Barney Beck (L)
  - Apedale Beck (L)
    - Beldon beck (R)
  - Bishopdale Beck (R)
    - Walden Beck (R)
      - Cowstone Gill (L)
    - Haw Beck (L)
    - Swinacote Gill (L)
      - Skellicks Beck (Rs)
      - Hacker Gill Beck (Ls)
        - Gayle Ing Beck (L)
    - Whit Beck (R)
    - Bleacarr Syke (R)
    - Howgill Gill (R)
    - Newhouse Gill (R)
    - Skell Gill (R)
    - Har Gill (L)
      - Riggs Beck (R)
      - Foss Gill (R)
        - Lockah Beck (R)
  - Eller Beck (L)
  - Gill Beck (R)
    - Worm Gill (R)
  - Wanley Beck (R)
    - East Beck (Rs)
      - Mill Beck (R)
    - West Beck (Ls)
  - Starra Beck (R)
  - Sister Ings Beck (L)
  - Craike Sike Gutter (R)
  - Newbiggin Beck (becomes Arngill Beck upstream of Newbiggin) (L)
  - Askrigg Beck (L)
  - West Marks Sike (R)
  - Paddock Beck (L)
  - River Bain (becomes Crooks Beck upstream of Semerwater) (R)
    - Little Ings Sike (R)
    - Raydale Beck (L)
      - New Close Gill (L)
        - South Grain Gill (L)
        - New Gill (R)
  - Grange Beck (becomes Skellgill Beck upstream) (L)
    - Meer Beck (R)
    - Dumbha Gill (L)
  - Goodman Sike (R)
  - Gayle Beck (R)
    - Duerley Beck (R)
  - Hardraw Beck (L)
    - Hearne Beck (R)
  - Widdale Beck (R)
    - Swinepot Gill (L)
    - Snaizeholme Beck (R)
  - Cotterdale Beck (L)
  - Mossdale Beck (R)

Hull catchment

- River Hull (MS)
  - Kelk Beck (L)
    - West Beck (Ls)

Minor coastal catchments

- Stone Creek (MS)
  - Hedon Haven (L)
  - Sands Drain/Keyingham Drain (Rs)
  - Ottringham Drain (Ls)
- Winestead Drain (MS) (reaches the Humber at the Patrington Channel)

=== North of Humber coast ===
All rivers entering the North Sea between Spurn Point at the mouth of the Humber and the Scottish Border. This section includes all rivers meeting the North Sea coast of the traditional county of Yorkshire, save for the Humber and Tees.

Barmston Main Drain catchment

- Barmston Main Drain (MS)
  - Gransmoor Drain (L)
  - Stream Dyke (R)

Minor coastal catchments

- Gypsey Race (MS)
- Sea Cut (Scalby Beck) (MS)
  - Burniston Beck (L)
- Mill Beck/Ramsdale Beck (MS)

Yorkshire Esk catchment

- River Esk (MS)
  - Spital Beck
  - Rig Mill Beck (R)
  - Little Beck (R)
  - Murk Esk (R)
    - Wheeldale Gill (Ls)
    - Wheeldale Beck (Rs)
  - Glaisdale Beck (R)
  - Stonegate Beck/Gill (L)
  - Great Fryup Beck (R)
  - Little Fryup Beck (R)
  - Danby Beck (R)
  - Commondale Beck (L)
    - Sleddale Beck (R)
  - Baysdale Beck (L)

Coastal catchments

- East Row Beck (MS)
- Sandsend Beck (MS)
- Staithes Beck (MS)
  - Easington Beck (L)
    - Roxby Beck (R)
- Kilton Beck (MS)

Skelton Beck catchment

- Skelton Beck (MS)
  - Saltburn Beck (L)
  - Tocketts Beck (L)
  - Waterfall Beck (R)

==== Tees catchment ====
- River Tees (MS)
  - Greatham Creek (L)
    - North Burn (R)
  - Billingham Beck (L)
  - Hartburn Beck (L)
  - River Leven (R)
  - Clow Beck (R)
  - River Skerne (L)
  - Langley Beck (L)
  - River Greta (R)
    - Sleightholme Beck (R)
  - Deepdale Beck (R)
  - River Balder (R)
    - Eggleston Burn (L)
  - River Lune (R)
    - Long Grain (Ls)
    - Lune Head Beck (Rs)
  - Hudeshope Beck (L)
  - Harwood Beck (L)
  - Maize Beck (R)

==== Minor coastal catchments ====
- Crimdon Beck (MS)
- Castle Eden Burn (MS)
- Horden Burn (MS)
- Hawthorn Burn (MS)

==== Wear catchment ====
- River Wear (MS)
  - Croxdale Beck (R)
  - River Browney (L)
    - River Deerness (L)
  - Stockley Beck (L)
  - River Gaunless
  - Bedburn Beck (R)
  - Waskerley Beck (L)
  - Bollihope Burn (R)
  - Stanhope Burn (L)
  - Rookhope Burn (L)
    - Killhope Burn (Ls)
    - Burnhope Burn (Rs)

==== Tyne catchment ====
- River Tyne (MS)
  - River Don (R)
    - Bede's Burn (L)
    - Monkton Burn (L)
    - Calfclose Burn (L)
    - Whittle Burn (R)
  - Ouseburn (L)
  - River Team (R)
    - Black Burn (L)
    - Strandy Burn (L)
    - Coltspool Burn (L)
    - Rowletch Burn (R)
  - River Derwent (R)
    - Burnhope Burn (R)
    - Beldon Burn (Ls)
    - Nookton Burn (Rs)
  - Stanley Burn (R)
  - Whittle Burn (L)
  - Stocksfield Burn (R)
  - March Burn (R)
  - Devil's Water (R)
    - West Dipton Burn (L)
    - Ham Burn or Rowley Burn (L)
  - River South Tyne (Rs)
    - River Allen (R)
      - River East Allen (Rs)
      - River West Allen (Ls)
        - Carr's Burn (L)
        - Wellhope Burn (L)
    - Haltwhistle Burn (L)
    - Tipalt Burn (L)
    - Park Burn (R)
    - Hartley Burn (L)
    - Thinhope Burn (L)
    - Knar Burn (L)
    - Gilderdale Burn (L)
    - River Nent (R)
    - River Black Burn (L) (known as Shield Water upstream)
    - Natress Gill (R)
    - Dry Burn (L)
    - Garrigill Burn (R)
    - Ash Gill (R)
  - River North Tyne (Ls)
    - Erring Burn (L)
    - Swin Burn (L)
    - Crook Burn (R)
    - Warks Burn (R)
    - Houxty Burn (R)
    - River Rede (L)
      - Lisles Burn (L)
      - Elsdon Burn (L)
      - Durtrees Burn (L)
      - Silis Burn (L)
      - Blakehope Burn (R)
      - Cottonshope Burn (L)
    - Hareshaw Burn (L)
    - Chirdon Burn (R)
    - Tarset Burn (L)
      - Tarret Burn (L)
      - Whickhope Burn (R)
        - Little Whickhope Burn (R)
      - Lewis Burn (L)
        - Akenshaw Burn (L)
    - Kielder Burn (L)
      - Ridge End Burn (L)
      - Scaup Burn (Rs)
      - White Kielder Burn (Ls)

Minor coastal catchment

- Brierdene Burn (MS)
- Seaton Burn (MS)

Blyth catchment

- River Blyth (MS)
  - Sleek Burn (L)
  - River Pont (R)

Wansbeck catchment

- River Wansbeck (MS)
  - River Font (L)
  - Hart Burn (L)

Lyne catchment

- River Lyne (MS)

Minor coastal catchment

- Chevington Burn (MS)

Coquet catchment

- River Coquet (MS)
  - Grange Burn (L)
  - Newton Burn (L)
  - Longdike Burn (R)
  - Swarland Burn (L)
  - Tod Burn (R)
  - Maglin Burn (R)
  - Forest Burn (R)
  - Wreigh Burn (L)
    - Back Burn (L)
  - Grasslees Burn (R)
  - Holystone Burn (R)
  - River Alwin (R)
  - Ridlees Burn (R)
  - Usway Burn (L)

Aln catchment

- River Aln (MS)
  - Cawledge Burn (R)
  - Denwick Burn (L)
  - Shipley Burn (L)
    - Eglingham Burn (R)
  - Edlingham Burn (R)
  - Shawdon Burn (L)
  - Coe Burn (R)
  - Callaly Burn (R)
  - Mere Burn (L)

==== Minor coastal catchments ====
- Howick Burn (MS)
- Embleton Burn (MS)
- Brunton Burn (MS)
- Waren Burn (MS)
- South Low (MS)
- North Low (MS)

==== Tweed catchment ====
Tributaries of the Tweed which are wholly in Scotland are omitted from this list but may be found in the List of rivers of Scotland.

- River Tweed (MS)
  - Whiteadder Water (L)
  - River Till (R) (known as River Breamish in its upper reaches)
    - River Glen (L)
      - Bowmont Water (Ls) (Bowman Water in lower reaches)
      - College Burn (Rs)
    - Wooler Water (L)
      - Carey Burn (Ls)
      - Harthope Burn (Rs)
    - Hetton Burn (R)
    - Lilburn Burn (Ls)
    - River Breamish (Rs)
      - Harelaw Burn (L)
      - Linhope Burn (L)

All further upstream tributaries of the Tweed are wholly in Scotland.

== See also ==
- List of canals of the United Kingdom
- List of rivers of Ireland
- List of rivers of Scotland
- List of rivers of the Isle of Man
- List of rivers of Wales
- Longest rivers of the United Kingdom
