= Cherrybrook (disambiguation) =

Cherry Brook is a tributary of the West Dart River on Dartmoor, Devon, England.

Cherrybrook can also refer to:

- Cherrybrook, New South Wales, Australia
- Cherry Brook, Nova Scotia, Canada
- Cherry Brook, Connecticut, United States

== See also ==
- Cherrybrook Kitchen, an American bakery
