= Roe River (disambiguation) =

Roe River may refer to several rivers.

- Roe River, Montana, United States
- Roe River (Western Australia), Australia

== See also ==
- River Roe, County Londonderry, Northern Ireland
- Roe Beck, Cumbria, England, also known as the River Roe in its lower reaches
