= Chetsford Water =

Minor catchment in South West England

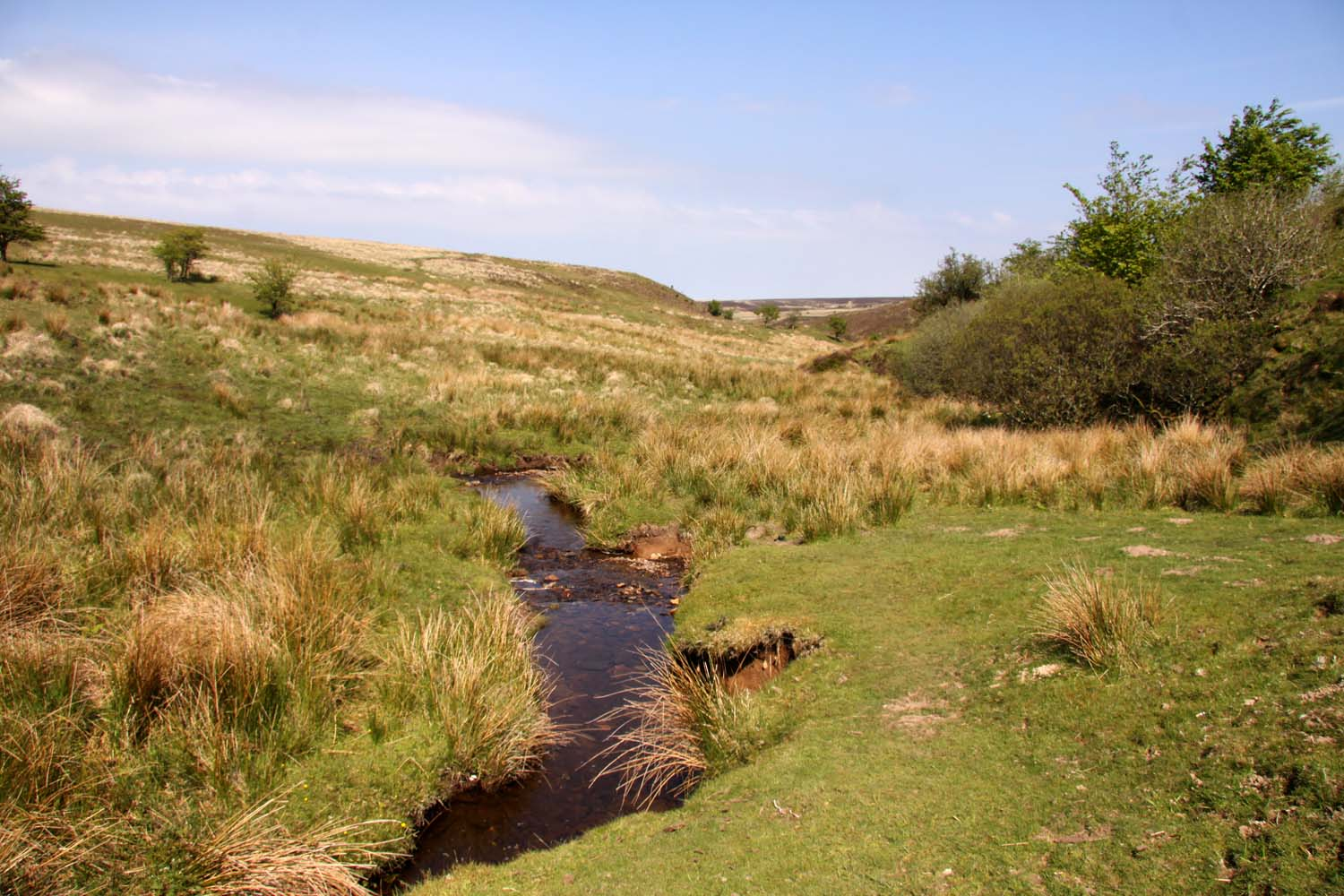
- Chetsford Water pictured in 2013
- Interactive map of Chetsford Water
- Location: South West England, United Kingdom

Chetsford Water is a minor catchment in South West England.

== Geography ==
Chetsford Water is a minor catchment that is located in Somerset, England, within Exmoor National Park. It rises near Alderman's Barrow and flows south-east approximately two kilometres to meet Embercombe Water.

== Fauna ==
Hen harriers breed in the area around Chetsford Water, making it a popular destination for birding.

== Human history ==
A group of prehistoric standing stones, possibly a cairn, sits at the confluence of Embercombe Water and Chetsford Water. The surrounding fields are also the site of several hut circles, possibly dating to the 2nd millennium BC.
