= River Ive =

River in Cumbria, England

Coordinates: 54.7835°N 2.9385°W

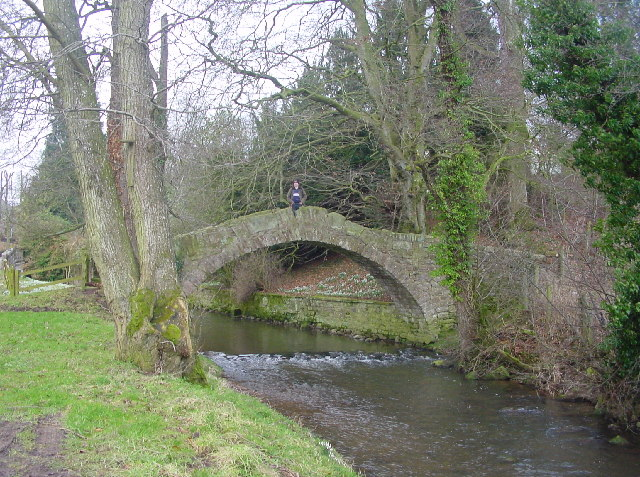
Wharton Bridge across the River Ive at Ivegill

The River Ive is a river in the county of Cumbria, England.

The Ive rises near the settlement of Hutton End and flows north-north-west, through Ivegill, below which it joins the Roe Beck. The Roe Beck joins its waters with those of the River Caldew, which continues to join with the River Eden in Carlisle.

== See also ==
- List of rivers of England
