= Nymet Rowland =

Village in Devon, England

- Village
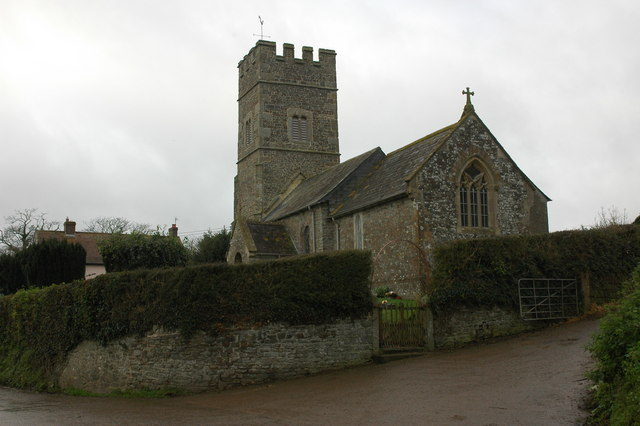
- Nymet Rowland Church

- Location within Devon Location within the United Kingdom
- Country: England
- County: Devon
- District: Mid Devon
- Time zone: UTC+0:00 (GST)
- Website: Official website

Nymet Rowland is a small village, and civil parish of the same name, in central Devon, England, north of Dartmoor. It takes part of its name from "Nymet", the old name for the nearby River Yeo. It is located just to the west of Lapford and south of Nymet Bridge, within the Mid Devon local authority area. Historically it formed part of Winkleigh Hundred; today the North Tawton hundred. It falls within the Cadbury Deanery for ecclesiastical purposes.

== Description ==
Nymet Rowland has a 15th-century church (St. Bartholomew). Traces of the 12th-century church remain in the S. doorway, and in the crude font.

== History ==
Nymet Rowland achieved brief prominence in the 1870s as the home of the Cheritons (nicknamed by the media the "North Devon savages"), a farming family living under primitive conditions whose lifestyle caused national outrage.
