= Annaside =

Hamlet in Cumbria, England

Coordinates: 54.26°N 03.39°W

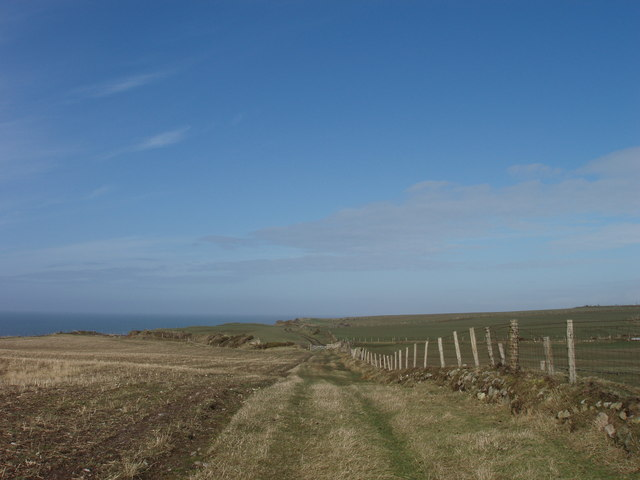
- Annaside Banks

- Location in Copeland Borough Location within Cumbria
- OS grid reference: SD0986
- Civil parish: Bootle
- Unitary authority: Cumberland
- Ceremonial county: Cumbria
- Region: North West
- Country: England
- Sovereign state: United Kingdom
- Post town: MILLOM
- Postcode district: LA19
- Dialling code: 01229
- Police: Cumbria
- Fire: Cumbria
- Ambulance: North West
- UK Parliament: Barrow and Furness

Annaside is a hamlet in Cumbria, England. It is located on the coast by the Irish Sea, about a 1 1/2 miles (2 1/2 km) south-west of Bootle and 7 miles (11 km) north-west of Millom. Annaside is primarily an agricultural settlement and takes its name from the River Annas which flows past the settlement. The Cumbria Coastal Way passes along Annaside Banks here.
