= Umborne Brook =

Stream in Devon, England

Coordinates: 50.74285°N 3.06614°W

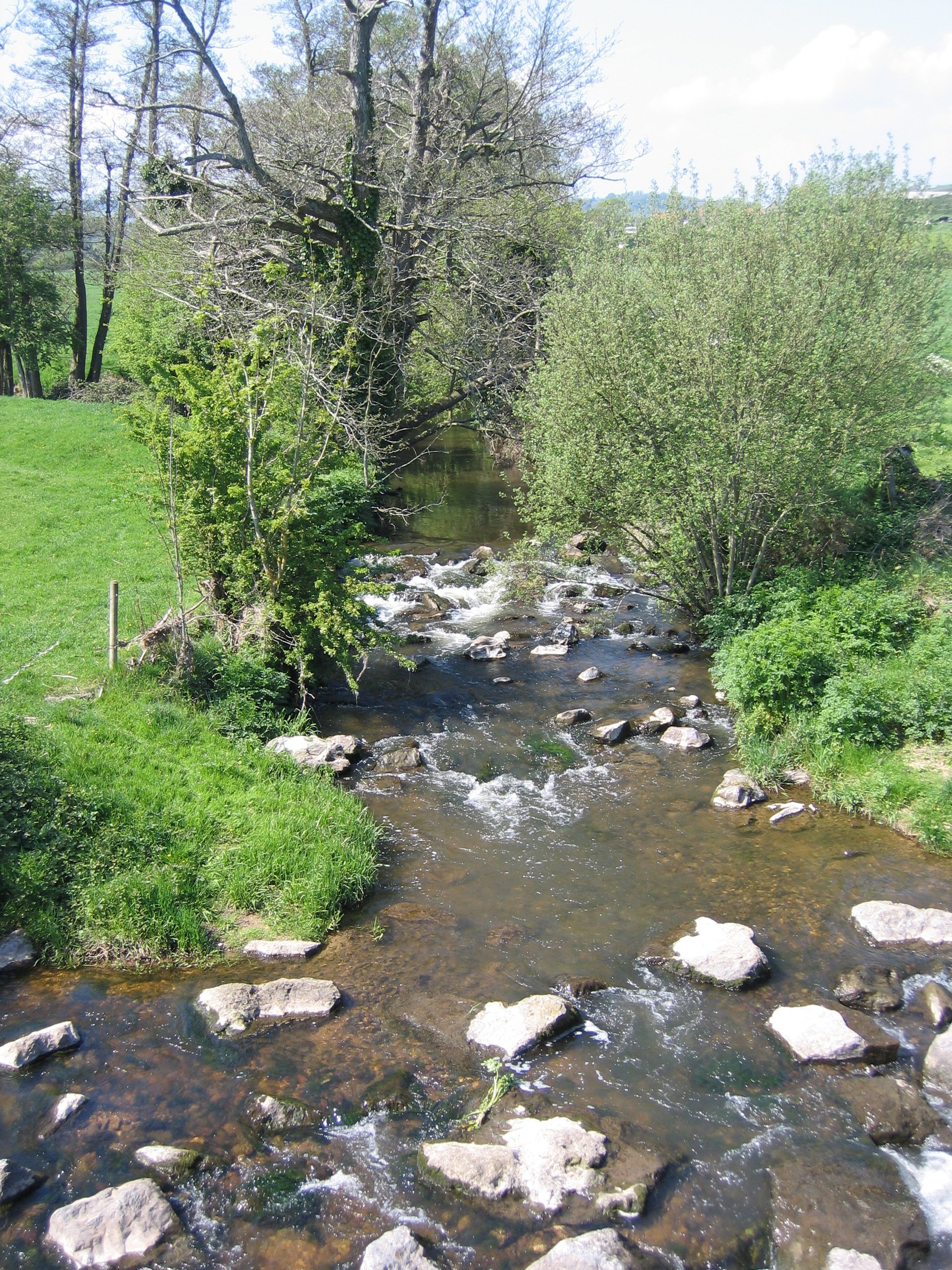
The confluence of the Umborne Brook and the River Coly

Umbourne Brook is a watercourse in Devon, England. In rises south-east of Upottery and runs past the villages of Widworthy and Wilmington, joins the River Coly at Colyton after. The Coly joins the River Axe which discharges into the English Channel between Seaton and Axmouth.

Tristram Risdon, writing in c. 1620 called the stream the little river Womborne, and Richard Polwhele referred to it as The Omber or Wombern in 1797. The name has the same derivation as Wimborne in Dorset, from Old English wimm meaning a meadow. The stream gives its name to Womberford, a ford at a now-lost location in the parish of Cotleigh.

== See also ==
- List of rivers of England
