= River Ashburn =

River in Devon, England

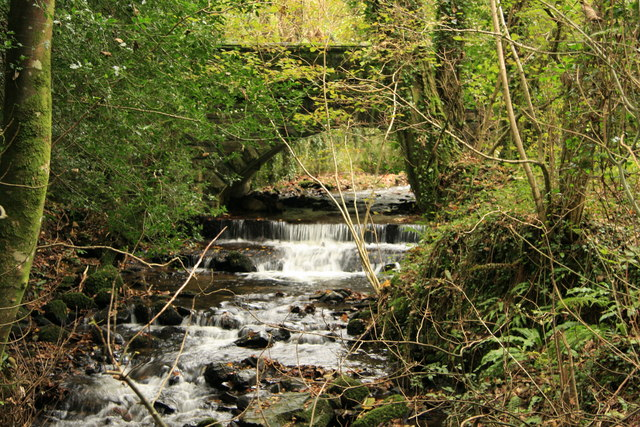
- River Ashburn near Ashburton

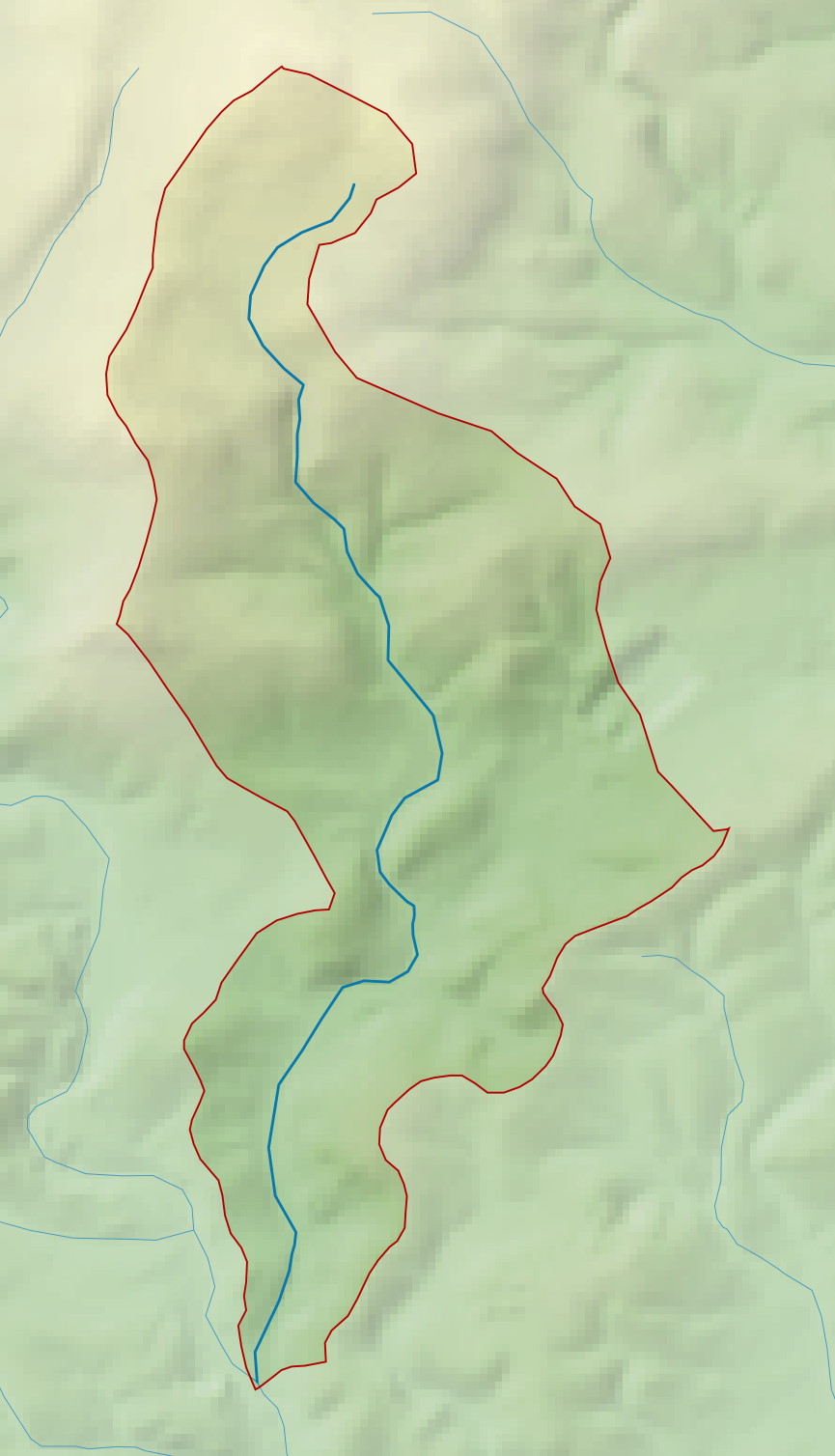
- Map of the Ashburn catchment

Location
- Country: England
- County: Devon

Physical characteristics
- Mouth
  - coordinates: 50.523°N 3.757°W
- Length: 10 km (6.2 mi)
- Basin size: 17 km^{2} (6.6 sq mi)

The Ashburn is a river in the Dartmoor moors in Devon in south-west England, flowing through the Ashburton valley to the River Dart.

The River Ashburn is a small river on Dartmoor, rising near Rippon Tor, flowing through the town of Ashburton and joining with the river Dart near Buckfastleigh. The source of the river is on Horridge Common at a height of 365 metres. The River Ashburn flows quickly down a step river valley through woods and under stone bridges before coming into Ashburton on the north side of town and passing by Ashburton Town Hall, then turning west and heading out of town via the town park, next to the A38 road before joining the River Dart. It is a typical, fast flowing, clean Dartmoor river.
