= Burnhope Burn =

Protected area in County Durham, England

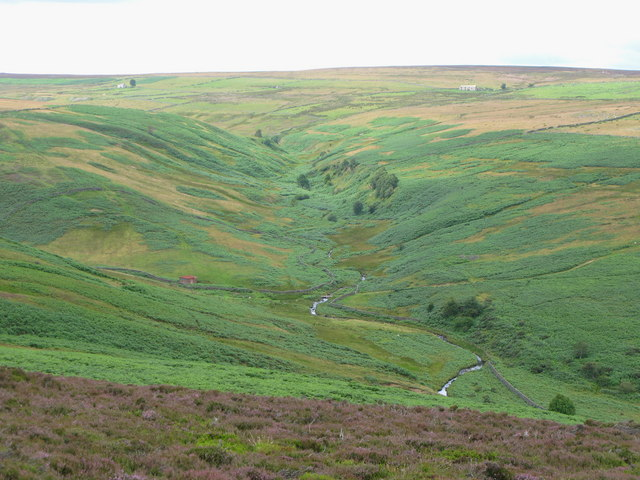
- The valley of Burnhope Burn

- Location within County Durham
- Location: Wear Valley, North East, England
- Coordinates: 54°51′6″N 1°57′20″W
- Area: 12.6 acres (5.1 ha)
- Established: 1987
- Governing body: Natural England
- Website: MAGiC MaP

Burnhope Burn is a Site of Special Scientific Interest in the Wear Valley district of north County Durham, England. It consists of a 12.6-acre (5.1 ha) area of woodland, carr, fen and mire in the valley of Burnhope Burn, just below the dam of the Derwent Reservoir, a mile (1.6 km) north-east of the village of Edmundbyers.

It contains a range of habitats that are characteristic of poorly drained soils and that are rare or local in County Durham; such as smooth-stalked sedge (Carex levigata), bogbean (Menyanthes) and globeflower (Trollius). In a small basin-mire in the northern part of the site, there are abundant communities of a number of species that have a localised distribution elsewhere in the county.
