= Ventiford Brook =

Stream in Devon, England

Coordinates: 50.562°N 3.641°W

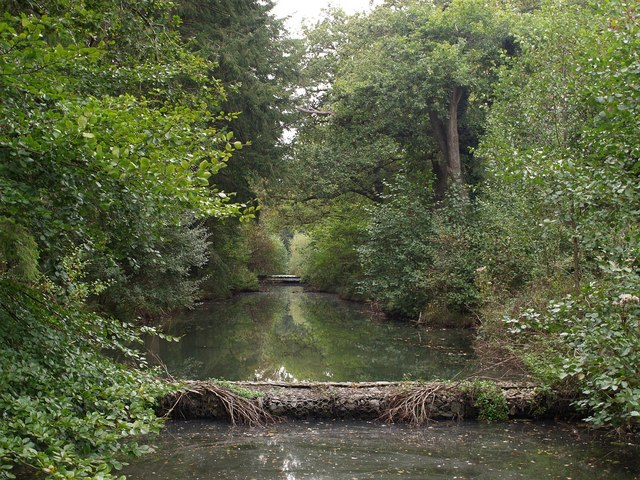
- Ventiford Brook, near Stover Lake

Location
- Country: England

Ventiford Brook is a stream located in Devon, England.

It was used as one of the water courses that filled the Stover Canal, when it was in use, along with the River Teign and River Bovey. There are plans to restore the canal, in which case the Ventiford Brook would probably need to be the main source of water for the canal.

The brook was also used as the basis for filling Stover Lake, which is located in the Stover Country Park near Bovey Tracey.
