= River Carey =

River in Devon, England

Coordinates: 50.6459°N 4.3280°W

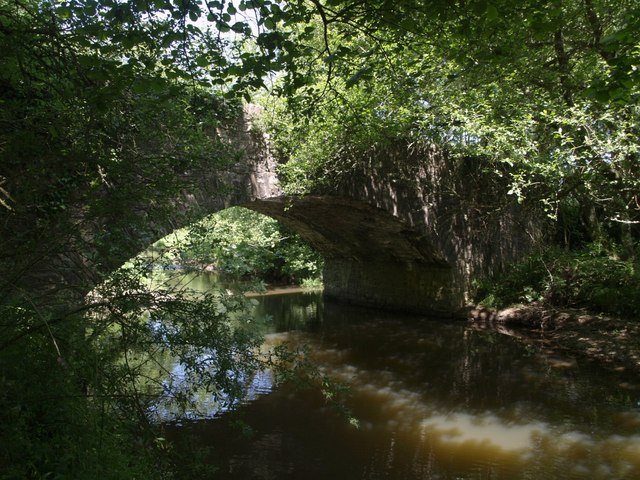
The River Carey

The River Carey is a small river in West Devon that is a tributary to the River Tamar.

The Carey rises in the Halwill Moor Plantation in Carey Valley, Halwill, flows south-west past Quoditch and Ashwater before flowing a southern course near Virginstow, then finally flowing into the River Tamar near the civil parish of St Stephens by Launceston Rural.
