= Keasden Beck =

Stream in Yorkshire, England

Coordinates: 54°06′18″N 2°26′37″W

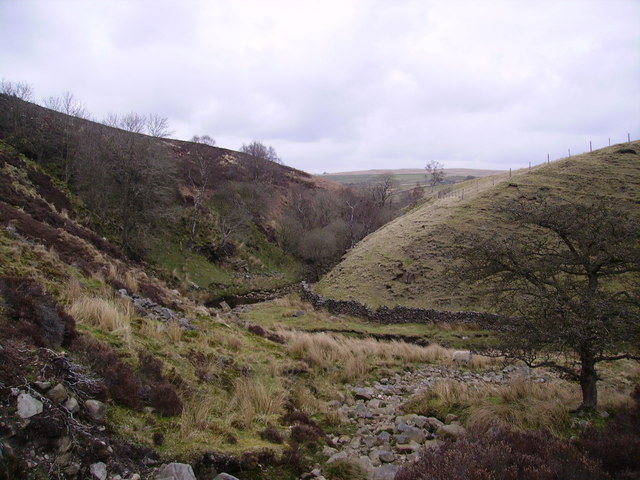
Confluence of Rough Gutter and Keasden Beck

Keasden Beck is a stream in Yorkshire (formerly the West Riding) rising near Keasden Head, joining the River Wenning south west of Clapham.
