= Norton Brook =

Stream in Somerset, England

Coordinates: 51°19′21″N 2°21′33″W

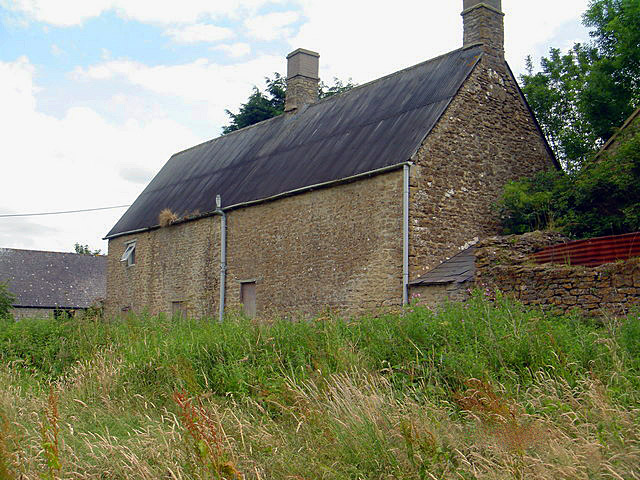
The Ranscombe Cottage stands just a few yards away from Norton Brook (View from the Ramsgate Wood)

Norton Brook is a small stream in Somerset, United Kingdom. The stream is a tributary of Wellow Brook. The body of water is located near Norton St Philip. Its length is close to 0.92 Miles (0.84 km). The stream further on splits up in two ways.
