= Pow Beck =

Stream in Cumbria, England

Coordinates: 54.4820°N 3.5922°W

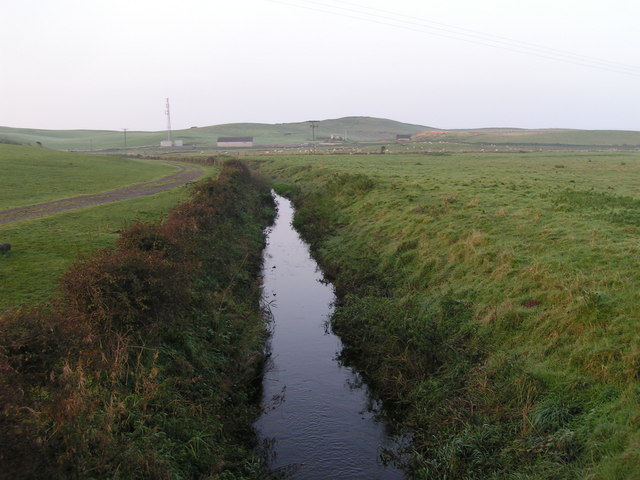
Pow Beck near St Bees

Pow Beck is a stream in Cumbria, rising near Mirehouse and flowing in a southwesterly direction to the village of St Bees where it flows into the Irish Sea. Despite rising only 0.62 miles (1 km) south of Whitehaven Harbour, the stream flows south for 2.8 miles (4.5 km) to the coast at St Bees. The present course was much altered by the Furness Railway in 1849 to improve the drainage of the valley. This included movement of a weir feeding Seamill, an undershot water mill.

The beck is defined as a flood risk due to the topography and geology of Whitehaven just to the north of where the stream rises. Surface water runoff and sewer water are potential contributory risks in flooding events.
