= Lapford Yeo =

River in Devon, England

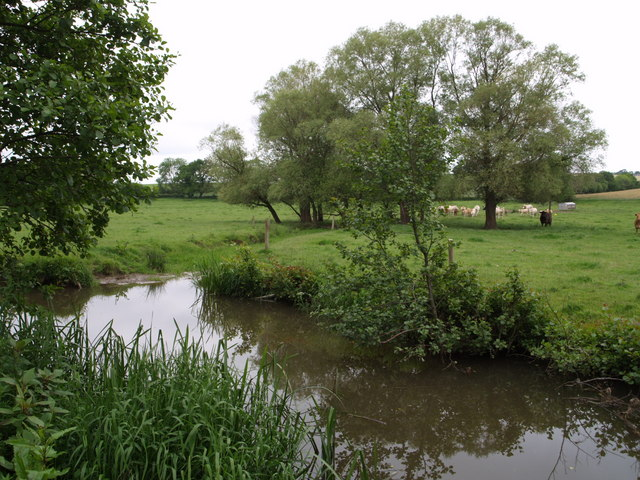
River Yeo near Lapford

The Lapford Yeo, also known as the River Yeo, is a tributary of the River Taw in Devon, England. It is one of several rivers of the same name, including another tributary of the Taw, the Barnstaple Yeo. The Lapford Yeo also flows within 2 miles (3.2 km) of the headwaters of another River Yeo, which is a tributary of the River Creedy.

The Lapford Yeo rises near South Tawton. It flows north through Bow and Zeal Monachorum to Lapford. It joins the Taw 1.5 miles (2.4 km) below Lapford, just below Nymet Bridge. Its largest tributary is the River Dalch, which joins the Yeo near Lapford. The river's catchment area is almost twice the size of the Taw's catchment area above the confluence, but has significantly lower rainfall than the upper Taw valley.

The river was earlier called the Nymet, thought to be a Celtic word meaning 'shrine'. Several Nymet place-names remain in the area, including Nymet Tracey and Nymet Rowland, and it seems that the area may have been sacred in Celtic times.
