= Red Brook =

River in Greater Manchester, England

Red Brook is a minor river in Greater Manchester in North West England.

Rising at the confluence of Caldwell Brook and Sinderland Brook at Covershaw Bridge near Sinderland Green, the river runs north west towards Partington, where it runs into the Manchester Ship Canal opposite the mouth of Glaze Brook.

== Caldwell Brook ==
Caldwell Brook runs northwards to Covershaw Bridge, draining the Civil Parish of Dunham Massey.

== Sinderland Brook ==
Sinderland Brook runs westwards from Sale.
