= River Coly =

River in Devon, England

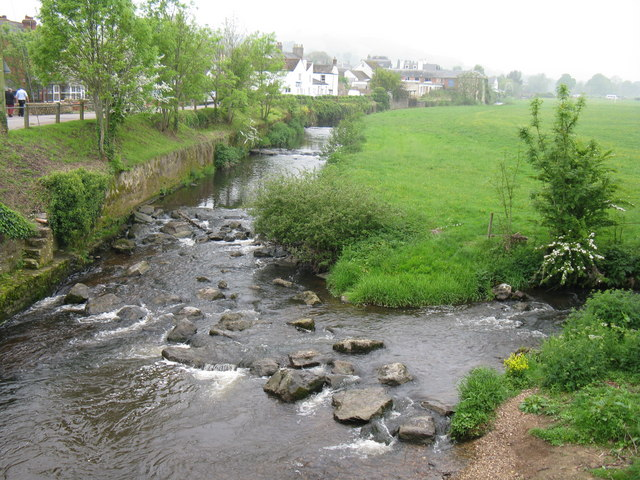
- River Coly at Colyton

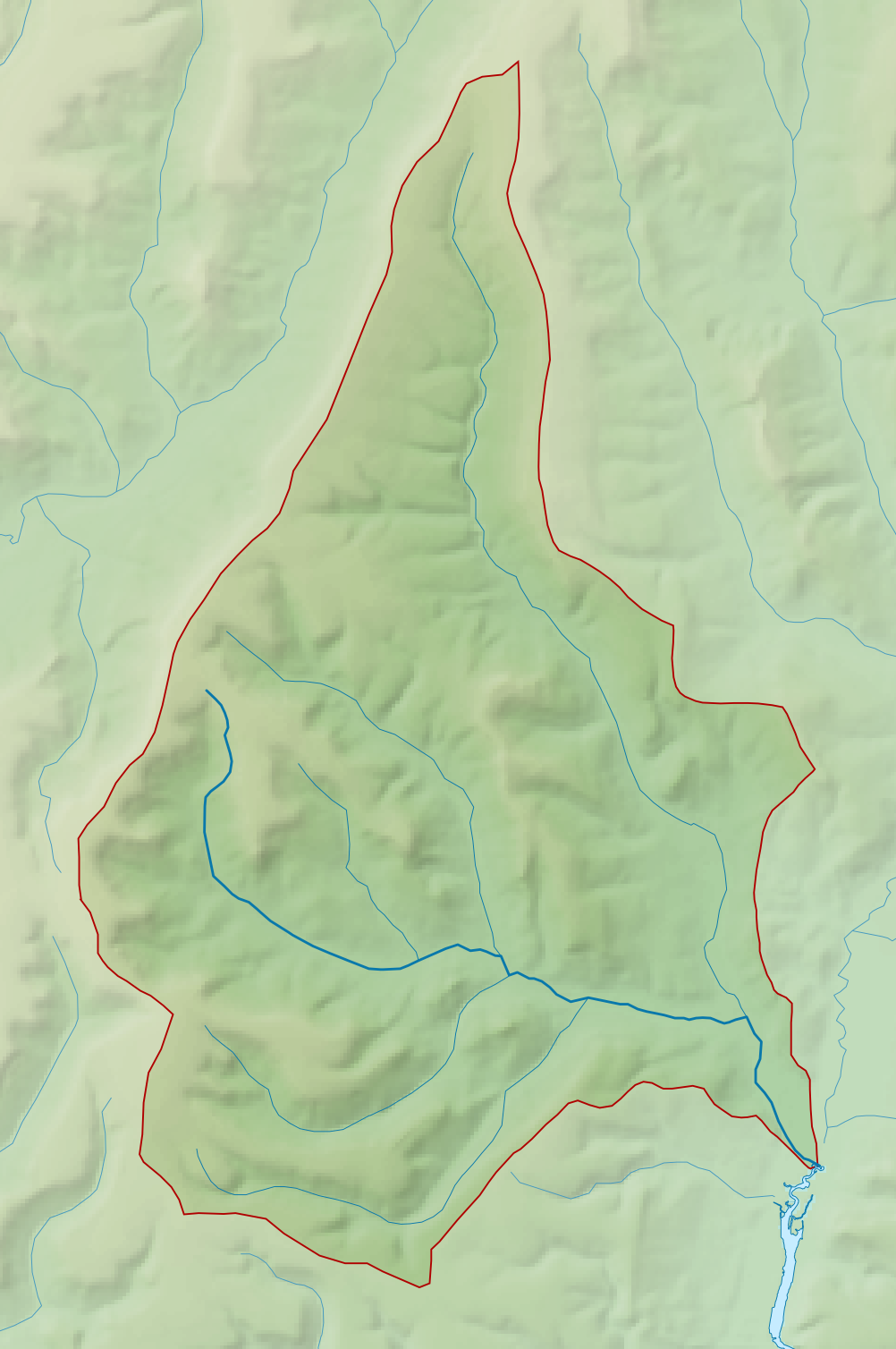
- Course and catchment of the River Coly

Location
- Country: England
- County: Devon
- Places: Farway, Colyton, Colyford

Physical characteristics
- Source
  - location: Farway
  - coordinates: 50.777157°N 3.169652°W
- Mouth: River Axe
  - location: Colyford
  - coordinates: 50.725210°N 3.052511°W
- Length: 13 km (8.1 mi)

Basin features
- Tributaries
  - left: Umborne Brook

The River Coly is a 13-kilometre (8.1 mi) long river in the county of Devon, in the south-west of England. It rises in several streams in the north of the parish of Farway. It then flows south through Farway village before turning east and flowing through the town of Colyton, where it is joined by the Umborne Brook. Below Colyton the Coly turns south again and flows through the village of Colyford, shortly after which it joins the River Axe at the landward end of the latter's estuary.
