= River Dalch =

River in Devon, England

The River Dalch, is the largest tributary of the Lapford Yeo in Devon, England. It rises to the east of Nomansland and flows in a south-westerly direction for 18.7 kilometres until its confluence with the Lapford Yeo at Lapford.
