= River Annas =

River in Cumbria, England

Coordinates: 54.2748°N 3.40534°W

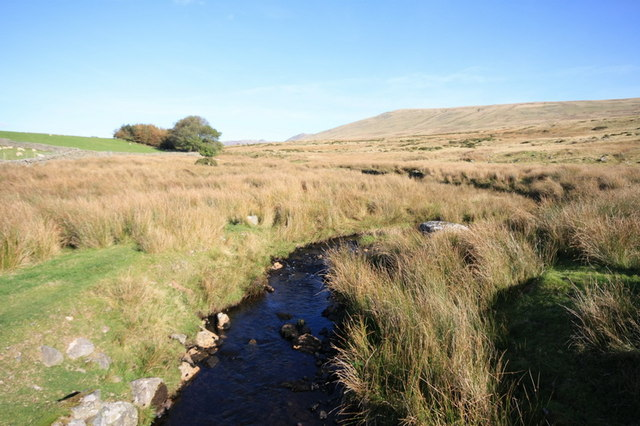
River Annas

The River Annas is a minor river in Cumbria in northwest England. It is formed as the Kinmont Beck and Crookley Beck which drain the southwestern fells of the Lake District, meet on the eastern edge of the village of Bootle. Their combined waters flow southwest towards Annaside on the Irish Sea coast. However longshore drift has diverted the river northwestwards parallel to the shore for a further 1.2 miles (2 km) so that it enters the sea at Selker. This section of river is followed by the Cumbria Coastal Way. The river is bridged by the A595 road and the Cumbrian coast railway line.
