= Broad Fleet =

Brook in Lancashire, England

Coordinates: 53.9530°N 2.8937°W

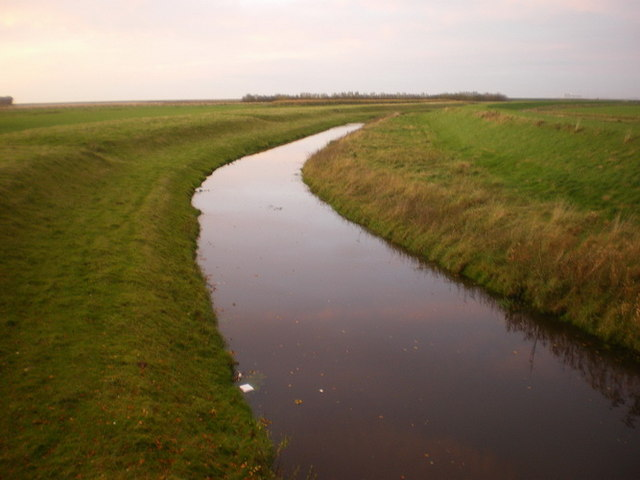
Broad Fleet seen from Broadfleet Bridge

Broad Fleet is a brook draining the area around Pilling Village in Lancashire, England. Its source is at Stake Pool, where Ridgy Pool joins Pilling Water. Broad Fleet is fed by Wrampool Brook as it approaches Morecambe Bay.
