= River Lyne =

River in Cumbria, England

Coordinates: 54.9780°N 3.0029°W

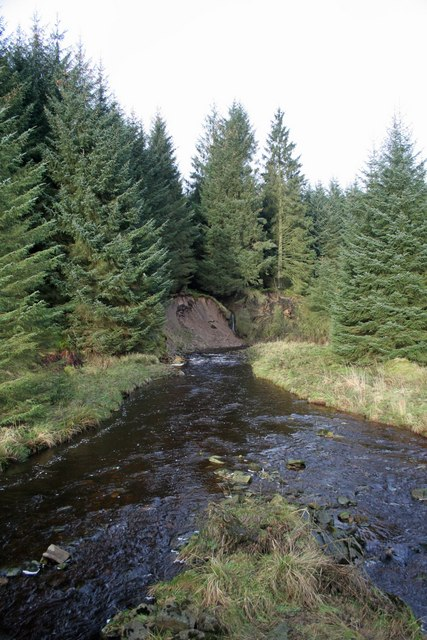
The Black Lyne in Kershope Forest

The River Lyne is a river of Cumbria in England.

The river is formed near the hamlet of Stapleton, five miles west of Bewcastle, by the confluence of the Black Lyne (moving from the north) and the White Lyne (from northeast).

Both branches have sources in the remote north east of Cumbria in Kershope Forest close to the borders with Scotland and Northumberland, with the Black Lyne having its source at Blacklyne Common and the White Lyne at Whitelyne Common.

After the meeting of the waters, the river continues in a west-by-south-westerly direction to Lynefoot, where it flows into the Border Esk.
