= Roe Beck =

River in Cumbria, England

Roe Beck River Roe
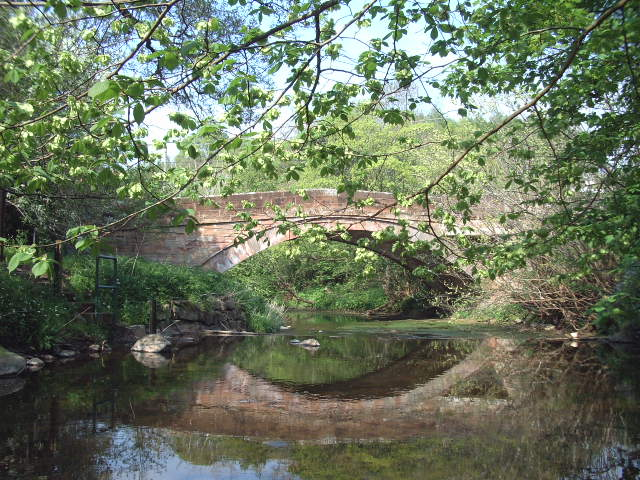
- Roe at Stockdalewath Bridge

- Location of the mouth within Cumbria

Location
- Country: England
- County: Cumbria

Physical characteristics
- Source
  - location: Skelton
- Mouth
  - location: River Caldew
  - coordinates: 54.816793°N 2.961384°W
- Length: 20.8 km (12.9 mi)
- Basin size: 69 km^{2} (27 sq mi)

Basin features
- Tributaries
  - right: Ive

Roe Beck also known as the River Roe in its lower reaches, is a beck that flows through Cumbria, England. It is a lower tributary of the River Caldew which it joins near Gaitsgill south of Dalston. The total length of the beck including Peel Gill is 20.8 kilometres (12.9 mi) and it has a catchment of 69 square kilometres (27 sq mi), which includes the area of its major tributary the River Ive.

== Course ==
Its headwaters rise on high ground near Hardrigg Hall between Lamonby and Skelton, it then flows north-west where it is joined by Peel Gill near Skelton Wood End. Other tributaries such as Whale Gill and Cockley Beck merge as it flows past Sowerby Row and Middlesceugh, where it turns northwards to meet its tributary, the River Ive near Highbridge. Beyond this confluence it is known as the River Roe, here it changes back to a north-westerly direction and is then joined by Bassen Brook before continuing through Stockdalewath, to join the River Caldew near Gaitsgill.

== Hydrology ==
The flow of the beck has been measured at a gauging station in its lower reaches at Stockdalewath since 1999. The catchment area to the gauge is 63 square kilometres (24 sq mi) some 91% of the total area of the beck.

The highest river level recorded at the station occurred on 8 January 2005, with a height of 2.88 metres (9 ft 5 in) and a flow of 99 cubic metres per second (3,500 cu ft/s). The second highest peak reached 2.72 metres (8 ft 11 in) with a flow of 90 cubic metres per second (3,200 cu ft/s) on 18 May 2013.

The catchment upstream of the station has an average annual rainfall of 984 millimetres (38.7 in) and a maximum altitude of 370 metres (1,210 ft) at the south-western edge of the basin.

== See also ==
- List of rivers of England
- Arkle Beck – also has a minor tributary known as the Roe Beck
