= Alderman's Barrow =

Burial mound in England

Coordinates: 51°10′05.72″N 3°39′54.89″W

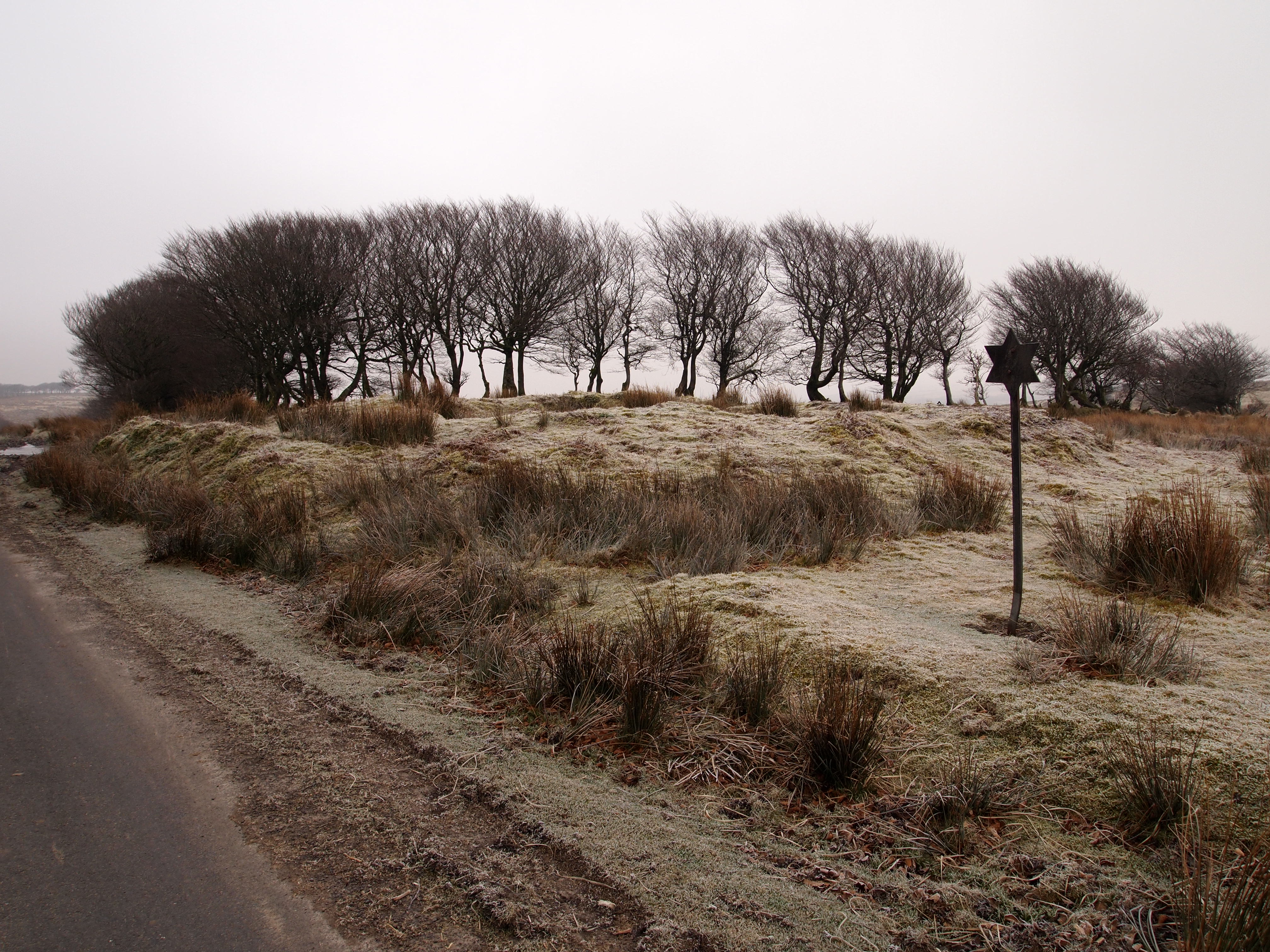
Alderman's Barrow, 2013

Alderman's Barrow is a bowl barrow on Exmoor in England. It was created as a burial chamber in the Bronze Age and subsequently became a marker for the boundary of the parishes of Exford, Exmoor, Luccombe and Porlock. It was known as Osmunesburgh in the 13th century, Owlaman's Burrow in the 17th century and was named Alderman's Barrow in 1782. It was protected as a scheduled monument in 1934.
