= Cherry Brook =

Stream on Dartmoor in Devon, England

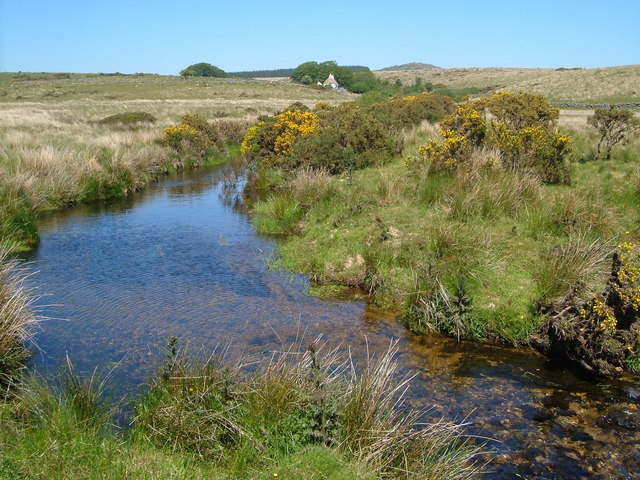
- Cherry Brook and Smith Hill Farm

Location
- Country: England
- County: Devon

Physical characteristics
- Source: 50.605°N 3.953°W
  - location: North of Lower White Tor
  - elevation: 490 m (1,610 ft)
- Mouth: 50.547°N 3.932°W
  - location: West Dart River
  - elevation: 300 m (980 ft)
- Length: 8 km (5.0 mi)

The Cherry Brook is a tributary of the West Dart River on Dartmoor, Devon, England.

It rises about a kilometre north of Lower White Tor in the open moorland and flows in a generally southerly direction past Powder Mills, the site of a 19th-century gunpowder factory, then under a clapper bridge where it turns easterly and passes under the B3212 road at Higher Cherrybrook Bridge. It then continues southwards, passes to the east of Smith Hill and then meets the B3357 road at Lower Cherrybrook Bridge where it is joined by the Muddilake Brook that has its source just west of Crockern Tor. The Cherry Brook then winds its way down to meet the West Dart River on the left bank near Sherberton.
