= List of shipwrecks in September 1868 =

The list of shipwrecks in September 1868 includes ships sunk, foundered, grounded, or otherwise lost during September 1868.

== 1 September ==
List of shipwrecks: 1 September 1868
Ship	State	Description
Helen	United Kingdom	The brig was abandoned in the Irish Sea 25 nautical miles (46 km) south east of Douglas Head, Isle of Man. Her crew were rescued by Douglas ( (United Kingdom of Great Britain and Ireland) Isle of Man). Helen was on a voyage from Liverpool, Lancashire to Königsberg, Prussia. She was towed back to Liverpool by Douglas.
Lucas Wildervank	Flag unknown	The ship sank in the North Sea. Her crew were rescued.
Margarethe	Norway	The ship was wrecked on the Jadder, in the North Sea. Her crew were rescued. She was on a voyage from a Scottish port to Stavanger.
Nautilus	United Kingdom	The brigantine was run into by Sparfel (United Kingdom) and sank off Lundy Island, Devon with the loss of four of her six crew. Survivors were rescued by Sparfel. Nautilus was on a voyage from Llanelly, Glamorgan to London.
Sostrine Clausien	Norway	The brig was destroyed by fire in the Clyde. She was on a voyage from Trinidad de Cuba, Cuba to the Clyde.
Tay	United Kingdom	The sloop was destroyed by fire at Bermondsey, Surrey.
Village Belle	United Kingdom	The schooner was driven ashore at Hamstead Point, Isle of Wight. She was on a voyage from Newcastle upon Tyne, Northumberland to Porto, Portugal. She was refloated on 3 September and resumed her voyage.
Unnamed	United Kingdom	The steamship was destroyed by fire at Bermondsey.

== 2 September ==
List of shipwrecks: 2 September 1868
Ship	State	Description
Berbice	United Kingdom	The barque ran aground at Briton Ferry, Glamorgan. She was on a voyage from Quebec City, Canada to Briton Ferry.
Secret	United Kingdom	The barque ran aground at Hartlepool, County Durham. She was on a voyage from Hartlepool to Kronstadt, Russia. She was refloated with the assistance of a number of tugs and resumed her voyage.

== 3 September ==
List of shipwrecks: 3 September 1868
Ship	State	Description
Charlotte	United Kingdom	The brigantine ran aground on St. Patrick's Rocks, in the Belfast Lough.
Christian	United Kingdom	The barque was driven ashore at Águilas, Spain.

== 4 September ==
List of shipwrecks: 4 September 1868
Ship	State	Description
Brignardella	Italy	The brig was wrecked 6 nautical miles (11 km) south of San Francisco, California, United States. She was on a voyage from Valparaíso, Chile to San Francisco.
James Joicey	United Kingdom	The steamship was driven ashore at Thorpeness, Suffolk. She was on a voyage from South Shields, County Durham to London.
Sarah	United Kingdom	The ship ran aground and sank on the Middle Ground Sands, in the Thames Estuary. Her crew were rescued. She was on a voyage from Purfleet, Essex to Rochester, Kent.

== 5 September ==
List of shipwrecks: 5 September 1868
Ship	State	Description
Carbon, and Velociter	United Kingdom	The collier collided with the steamship Velociter at Millwall, Essex. Both vessels were consequently beached. Carbon was bound to London. Velociter was on a voyage from London to Calais, France.
Cordelia	United Kingdom	The schooner was run down and sunk in the English Channel off The Lizard, Cornwall by the barque Undine (United Kingdom). Her six crew were rescued by Unidne.
Doctor	United Kingdom	The schooner was driven ashore and severely damaged at Kerney Point, in the Strangford Lough. She was on a voyage from Caernarfon to Hull, Yorkshire. She was refloated and towed in to Strangford, County Antrim.
Melita	United Kingdom	The steamship caught fire and sank in the Atlantic Ocean 800 nautical miles (1,500 km) west of Queenstown, County Cork. All on board were rescued by the barque August ( Canada. She was on a voyage from Boston, Massachusetts, United States to Liverpool, Lancashire.
Queen of the Thames	United Kingdom	The ship was wrecked on the Mouse Sand, in the Thames Estuary, according to a message in a bottle washed up at Sheerness, Kent in late September.
Victory	United Kingdom	The ship was run down and sunk in the Bristol Channel by the steamship Princess Royal (United Kingdom).
Volunteer	United Kingdom	The ship ran aground on the North Rœmer Rocks, off Læsø, Denmark. She was refloated and put in to Karrebæksminde, Denmark.

== 6 September ==
List of shipwrecks: 6 September 1868
Ship	State	Description
Clyde	(United Kingdom of Great Britain and Ireland) New Zealand	The 14-ton cutter was crushed between the wharf and the schooner Morea ( (United Kingdom of Great Britain and Ireland) New Zealand) at Auckland.
Ewin	United Kingdom	The barque was driven ashore on "Forman", Spain.
Greenock	United Kingdom	The ship foundered in the Atlantic Ocean with the loss of two of her 24 crew. Survivors were rescued by Rhea Sylvia (United States). Greenock was on a voyage from Havana, Cuba to Queenstown, County Cork.
Sarah and Mary	United Kingdom	The ship was driven ashore at St. Alban's Head, Dorset. She was on a voyage from South Shields, County Durham to Dublin. She was refloated and resumed her voyage.
Treasure Trove	United Kingdom	The ship, which had caught fire on 4 September, was abandoned in the Atlantic Ocean. Her crew were rescued by Carlos (Argentina). Treasure Trove was on a her maiden voyage, from South Shields, County Durham to Calcutta, India.

== 7 September ==
List of shipwrecks: 7 September 1868
Ship	State	Description
Alfred Hortense	France	The ship schooner struck a sunken wreck off the Haisborough Sands, in the North Sea off the coast of Norfolk, United Kingdom and foundered. Her crew survived. She was on a voyage from Caen, Calvados to Sunderland, County Durham, United Kingdom.
Amy	United Kingdom	The steamship was run ashore near the Vinga Lighthouse, Sweden. Her crew were rescued.
Blanche Howe	United Kingdom	The ship was damaged by fire at Marseille, Bouches-du-Rhône, France.
British Prince	United Kingdom	The ship ran aground in the Hooghly River. She was refloated and resumed her voyage.
John G. Richardson	United States	The ship was abandoned in the Atlantic Ocean (41°06′N 62°45′W). Her sixteen crew were rescued by E. B. Haws ( Canada). John G. Richardson was on a voyage from Saint John, New Brunswick, Canada to Montevideo, Uruguay.
Milwaukee	United States	The steamship ran aground and was wrecked at Grand Haven, Michigan. Her crew and all 70 passengers were rescued.
R. H. Tucker	United States	The ship ran aground on the Blackwater Bank, in the Irish Sea and was subsequently destroyed by fire. Her 26 crew were rescued by the Cahire, Courtown and Rosslare Lifeboats, but four would-be rescuers were drowned when their boat capsized. She was on a voyage from Liverpool, Lancashire, United Kingdom to Boston, Massachusetts.
Volant	United Kingdom	The ship struck a rock in the Sound of Kyleakin and was holed. She put in to Kyleakin, Isle of Skye in a severely leaky condition.

== 8 September ==
List of shipwrecks: 8 September 1868
Ship	State	Description
Baltic	United Kingdom	The steamship caught fire in the North Sea off the coast of Yorkshire and was abandoned. Her crew were rescued by Gevalls (Sweden). Baltic was on a voyage from Dordrecht, South Holland, Netherlands to Newcastle upon Tyne, Northumberland. She sank the next day.
Evelyn Mary	United Kingdom	The collier was driven ashore at Flamborough Head, Yorkshire. She was on a voyage from Newcastle upon Tyne to London. She broke up on 13 September.
Hippocampus	United States	The 153 GRT passenger-cargo ship sank in a squall in Lake Michigan, on a voyage from St. Joseph, Michigan to Chicago. 26 of the 55 passengers and crew onboard were lost.
Ibis	United Kingdom	The smack was wrecked on the Conister Rock, Douglas, Isle of Man. Her crew were rescued. She was on a voyage from Liverpool, Lancashire to Stranraer, Wigtownshire.
No. 1	United Kingdom	The ship was driven ashore east of Blakeney. She was refloated and taken in to Blakeney in a leaky condition.
Wave	United Kingdom	The ship was driven ashore west of Blakeney, Norfolk. She was refloated and taken in to Blakeney in a leaky condition.
William	United Kingdom	The ship was driven ashore and wrecked at Wells-next-the-Sea, Norfolk.
Yankee Girl	United States	The vessel was lost in an unknown location. Lost with all 11 crew.

== 9 September ==
List of shipwrecks: 9 September 1868
Ship	State	Description
Banshee	United Kingdom	The steamship ran aground and was severely damaged in the River Bann. She was on a voyage from Glasgow, Renfrewshire to Coleraine, County Antrim. She was refloated on 11 September.
Canopus	(United Kingdom of Great Britain and Ireland) Jersey	The schooner ran aground on the Scroby Sands, Norfolk. She was on a voyage from South Shields, County Durham to Jersey. She was refloated but had to be beached at Great Yarmouth, Norfolk, where she was wrecked.
Disraeli	United Kingdom	The barque was abandoned in the Atlantic Ocean. Her crew were rescued by the barque Moskwa (Russia). Disraeli was on a voyage from Bathurst, New Brunswick, Canada to Belfast, County Antrim.
Gem	United Kingdom	The ship was driven ashore and wrecked at Redcar, Yorkshire. She was on a voyage from South Shields, County Durham to Havre de Grâce, Seine-Inférieure, France.
Perseverance	United Kingdom	The ship was driven ashore at Peterhead, Aberdeenshire. She was on a voyage from Peterhead to Harburg. She was refloated and put back to Peterhead.
Runeberg	Norway	The barque was abandoned in the Atlantic Ocean (42°28′N 57°25′W). Her crew were rescued by E. B. Haws ( Canada). Runeberg was on a voyage from Port Talbot, Glamorgan, United Kingdom to New York City. Eight of the crew of John G. Richardson (United States) who had been rescued by E. B. Haws got on board Runeberg. They took her in to Halifax, Nova Scotia, Canada with assistance from the steamship Druid (United Kingdom).

== 10 September ==
List of shipwrecks: 10 September 1868
Ship	State	Description
Charlotte	United Kingdom	The ship was driven ashore near Ballina, County Mayo.
Hamilton	United Kingdom	The ship was driven ashore on Lady Isle, in the Firth of Clyde. She was on a voyage from Troon, Ayrshire to Demerara, British Guiana. She was refloated and put back to Troon.
Kate	United Kingdom	The fishing smack sank off King's Lynn, Norfolk. Her crew were rescued.

== 11 September ==
List of shipwrecks: 11 September 1868
Ship	State	Description
Admiral Kanaris	United Kingdom	The steamship ran aground and was wrecked on Neckman's Ground, in the Baltic Sea. Her crew were rescued. She was on a voyage from the River Wear to Kronstadt, Russia.
Gentle Annie	United Kingdom	The ship was wrecked at Lagos, Africa. Her crew were rescued. She was on a voyage from Liverpool, Lancashire to Lagos.
Goshawk	United Kingdom	The brig was wrecked on the Longsand, in the North Sea off the coast of Essex with the loss of a crew member. Survivors were rescued by the smacks Queen Victoria and Ranger (both United Kingdom). Goshawk was on a voyage from Sunderland, County Durham to Shoreham-by-Sea, Sussex.
Helvetia	United Kingdom	The ship caught fire at Constantinople, Ottoman Empire and was scuttled.
Solon	United Kingdom	The ship caught fire at Constantinople and was scuttled.
Sunbeam	United Kingdom	The brig foundered in the Bay of Biscay. Her crew were rescued by the brig Hannah (United Kingdom). Sunbeam was on a voyage from Newport, Monmouthshire to Buenos Aires, Argentina.
Unnamed	Flag unknown	A schooner collided with Zealous (United Kingdom) and sank in the Mediterranean Sea with some loss of life.

== 12 September ==
List of shipwrecks: 12 September 1868
Ship	State	Description
Bogota	United Kingdom	The ship was abandoned off Tristan d'Acunha having caught fire the previous day. Her crew survived. She was on a voyage from Glasgow, Renfrewshire to Penang, Straits Settlements.
Jessie	United Kingdom	The brig was struck by a sea off Lundy Island, Devon and was damaged. She was on a voyage from London to Swansea, Glamorgan. She put in to Padstow, Cornwall in a leaky condition.
Mary and Jane	United Kingdom	The ship collided with Rose (United Kingdom) and sank off the Garmoyle Lighthouse, County Antrim. Her crew were rescued. She was on a voyage from Bowling, Dunbartonshire to Tobermory, Isle of Mull.
Melita	United Kingdom	The ship was destroyed by fire in the Atlantic Ocean. All on board were rescued by Jacob A. Stanler (United States). Melita was on a voyage from Boston, Massachusetts, United States to Liverpool, Lancashire.
Unnamed	United Kingdom	The Humber Keel was driven ashore and wrecked at Sandsend, Yorkshire with the loss of a crew member.

== 13 September ==
List of shipwrecks: 13 September 1868
Ship	State	Description
Eldon	United Kingdom	The steamship was driven ashore on Smyge, Sweden. She was on a voyage from Newcastle upon Tyne, Northumberland to Kronstadt, Russian Empire. She was refloated and towed to Copenhagen, Denmark for repairs.
Industry	United Kingdom	The ship sprang a leak and sank at Snettisham, Norfolk. Her crew were rescued. She was on a voyage from Snettisham to Wisbech, Cambridgeshire.
Vivid	United Kingdom	The ship was abandoned off "Cahore Island", County Wexford. Her crew were rescued by a lifeboat. She came ashore on the island.
Unnamed	United Kingdom	The yacht was run down and sunk by the steamship Rose (United Kingdom) at Sligo. All ten people on board were rescued by Rose.
Unnamed	France	The brig was lost off Maranhão, Brazil. Her crew survivec.

== 14 September ==
List of shipwrecks: 14 September 1868
Ship	State	Description
Defiance	United Kingdom	The schooner was run down off McNabs Island, Nova Scotia, Canada by the steamship Pioneer ( Canada). Defiance was on a voyage from Chester, Cheshire to Halifax, Nova Scotia. She was towed in to Halifax.
Una	United Kingdom	The schooner caught fire at Milos, Greece and was scuttled.
Union	United Kingdom	The ship foundered 20 nautical miles (37 km) off New Quay Cardiganshire. Her crew were rescued. She was on a voyage from Newport, Monmouthshire to Letterkenny, County Donegal.
William C. Ross	United States	The schooner was wrecked on Ross Island, in the Navigator Islands with the loss of all but three of her crew.

== 15 September ==
List of shipwrecks: 15 September 1868
Ship	State	Description
Annie Williams	United Kingdom	The ship ran aground at Padstow, Cornwall. She was on a voyage from London to Swansea, Glamorgan.
Circe, and Regina	French Navy; Regia Marina	The Circe-class frigate Circe collided with the frigate Regina. Six crew were killed and seven were injured. Three crew of Regina were injured.
Clough	United States	Schooner sunk in a gale on Lake Erie north of Cleveland.
Khersonese	United Kingdom	The ship ran aground in the River Thames at Blackwall, Middlesex. She was refloated.
Louise	Netherlands	The steamship was wrecked on the Oxar Rocks, on the coast of Lothian, United Kingdom. She was on a voyage from Rotterdam, South Holland to Granton, Lothian.
Nith	United Kingdom	The ship was destroyed by fire 30 nautical miles (56 km) south of Waterford. Her crew were rescued by the brig Alsoinn (Norway). Nith was on a voyage from Liverpool, Lancashire to Bombay, India.
Parkersburg	United States	The steamship struck a sunken rock in the Gulf of Fonseca and was wrecked. All on board were rescued. She was on a voyage from Panama City, United States of Colombia to a port in Central America.
Sea Flower	United Kingdom	The ship was abandoned in the Atlantic Ocean.

== 16 September ==
List of shipwrecks: 16 September 1868
Ship	State	Description
Ceres	United Kingdom	The ship was driven ashore at Sandsend, North Riding of Yorkshire. She was refloated and towed in to Whitby, Yorkshire for repairs.
Foxhound	United Kingdom	The ship ran aground on the Dragor Sand, in the Baltic Sea. She was on a voyage from Memel, Prussia to Cardiff, Glamorgan. She was refloated and resumed her voyage.
Henry Moore	United Kingdom	The ship was destroyed by fire off the coast of Portugal. Her crew were rescued by Jeane (Netherlands). Henry Moore was on a voyage from Liverpool, Lancashire to Bombay, India. The burning hulk was towed in to Gibraltar on 27 September y the steamship Ann (United Kingdom).
Herstelling	Netherlands	The ship was wrecked on "Stoneskar", Russia. Her crew were rescued. She was on a voyage from Newcastle upon Tyne, Northumberland, United Kingdom to Saint Petersburg, Russia.
Lapwing	United Kingdom	The ship was driven ashore at Lowestoft, Suffolk. She was refloated and towed in to Lowestoft.
Persian	United States	Persian The wooden schooner was carrying a cargo of wheat in Lake Huron off the coast of Michigan when the schooner E. B. Allen (United States) collided with her while trying to pass her. E. B. Allen′s captain reported seeing Persian head toward the Michigan coast, but Persian sank in 168 feet (51 m) of water at 45.69935°N 84.1529°W with the loss of her entire crew.
Samson	United Kingdom	The ship sank at Havre de Grâce, Seine-Inférieure, France. She was on a voyage from Newcastle upon Tyne to Honfleur, Manche, France.
Ulalie	United Kingdom	The yacht was run down and sunk in Southampton Water by a steamship. All on board were rescued by the steamship.

== 17 September ==
List of shipwrecks: 17 September 1868
Ship	State	Description
Antelope	United Kingdom	The brig was driven ashore at Southend, Essex.
Ardnarce	Sweden	The steamship was wrecked at Varberg. She was on a voyage from London, United Kingdom to Malmö.
Daisy	United Kingdom	The ship was run into by the steamship Don Pedro (Portugal) and sank at Grimsby, Lincolnshire. She was refloated on 1 January 1869 and taken in to Grimsby.
Langdale	United Kingdom	The ship was destroyed by fire at Porthcawl, Glamorgan. She was on a voyage from Porthcawl to Bombay, India.
Squirrel	Royal Navy	The Racer-class brig-sloop ran aground in Plymouth Sound. She was refloated.

== 18 September ==
List of shipwrecks: 18 September 1868
Ship	State	Description
Reiver	United Kingdom	The steamship was wrecked near the Andaman Islands. Her passengers were rescued. She was on a voyage from India to China.
Tartar	United Kingdom	The schooner was driven ashore at Saltfleet, Lincolnshire. She was on a voyage from Lyme Regis, Dorset to Hull, Yorkshire. She had sunk by 21 September.

== 19 September ==
List of shipwrecks: 19 September 1868
Ship	State	Description
Despatch, and Galatea	United Kingdom	The paddle steamer Despatch was run into by the schooner Galatea off Spithead, Hampshire. She was then run into by a brig. Her captain was severely injured. She was on a voyage from Honfleur, Manche to Southampton, Hampshire. Galatea was severely damaged.
Lee	United Kingdom	The schooner was driven ashore and wrecked at Rosehearty, Aberdeenshire.
Oscar	Prussia	The ship was driven ashore and wrecked near Saint Andrews. Fife, United Kingdom. Her crew were rescued by the Saint Andrews Lifeboat. She was on a voyage from Sannesund to Dundee, Forfarshire, United Kingdom.
River	United Kingdom	The ship was wrecked on the Preparis Reef, in the Indian Ocean. Her crew were rescued.
Zeelandia	Netherlands	The ship was destroyed by fire. Her crew were rescued by Engel (Netherlands).

== 20 September ==
List of shipwrecks: 20 September 1868
Ship	State	Description
Anna Marie	Norway	The brig was wrecked on the Gunfleet Sand, in the North Sea off the coast of Suffolk, United Kingdom. Her crew were rescued by the smack Scout (United Kingdom). She was on a voyage from Dram to London, United Kingdom. She was refloated on 29 September and towed in to Harwich, Essex, United Kingdom.
George Bell	United Kingdom	The ship was driven ashore at Reedy Point, Delaware, United States. She was on a voyage from Boston, Massachusetts to Philadelphia, Pennsylvania, United States.
Industry	United Kingdom	The brig was destroyed by fire off Anholt. Her crew were rescued. She was on a voyage from Sundsvall, Sweden to Aberdeen.
Liberté	(Haiti) Haitian rebels	Alexandre Pétion at Petit-Goâve. The warship was shelled and sunk at Petit-Goâve by the gunboat Alexandre Pétion ( (Haiti) Haitian Navy).
Sophia	Norway	The schooner was driven ashore and severely damaged at Wick, Caithness, United Kingdom. Her crew were rescued. She was on a voyage from Dram to Wick.
Sylvain	(Haiti) Haitian rebels	The warship was attacked by the gunboat Alexandre Pétion ( (Haiti) Haitian Navy) at Petit-Goâve. She was set afire and abandoned by her crew.
Triton	(Russian Empire) Grand Duchy of Finland	The ship ran aground on the Roar Sand, in the English Channel off Dungeness, Kent, United Kingdom. She was on a voyage from Grimsby, Lincolnshire to Port Said, Egypt. She was refloated and towed in to Dover, Kent.
Vasco de Gama	United Kingdom	The barque was abandoned in the Atlantic Ocean. Her crew were rescued on 25 September by Caledonian (United Kingdom). Vasco de Gama was on a voyage from Quebec City, Canada to Hull, Yorkshire.

== 21 September ==
List of shipwrecks: 21 September 1868
Ship	State	Description
Augusta	Denmark	The yacht sprang a leak and was beached at "Stavnshovel", north of Grenå.
Giacomo	Flag unknown	The ship was wrecked at Maldonado, Uruguay. Her crew were rescued. She was on a voyage from Cardiff, Glamorgan, United Kingdom to Maldonado.
Laurence	United States	The ship caught fire whilst on a voyage from San Francisco, California to New York. She was abandoned the next day. Her crew survived.
Southwick	United Kingdom	The ship ran aground on the Nore and capsized. She was righted.

== 22 September ==
List of shipwrecks: 22 September 1868
Ship	State	Description
Agnes	United Kingdom	The ship was driven ashore and wrecked at "Hellesport". Her crew were rescued. She was on a voyage from Larne, County Antrim to "Glenalm".
Cornelia Jantina	Netherlands	The ship was wrecked at "Lerwig". She was on a voyage from London, United Kingdom to Sundsvall, Sweden.
Hae Hawaii	United States	The 368-ton whaling barque dragged her anchor during a gale and was blown ashore on the Seahorse Islands in the Chukchi Sea off the coast of the Department of Alaska.
Howden	United Kingdom	The schooner was driven ashore at Dungeness, Kent. She was on a voyage from Santos, Brazil to Antwerp, Belgium. She was refloated and taken in to Rye, Sussex.
Kingfisher	United Kingdom	The smack was run into by the schooner Sultan (United Kingdom) and foundered in the North Sea off Flamborough Head, Yorkshire.

== 23 September ==
List of shipwrecks: 23 September 1868
Ship	State	Description
Kate and Jane	United Kingdom	The ship sank at "Whilton". She was on a voyage from Maldon, Essex to Goole, Yorkshire.
Murton	United Kingdom	The steamship ran aground on the Blacktail Sand, in the Thames Estuary.

== 24 September ==
List of shipwrecks: 24 September 1868
Ship	State	Description
Elizabeth Williams	United Kingdom	The ship foundered at Hell's Mouth with the loss of three lives. She was on a voyage from Liverpool, Lancashire to Porthdinllaen, Caernarfonshire.
Empress	United Kingdom	The ship was driven ashore and wrecked at Morte Point, Devon. Her crew were rescued. She was on a voyage from Fowey, Cornwall to Newport, Monmouthshire.
Lurline	United Kingdom	The barque was destroyed by fire off Caoe Scalambra, Sicily, Italy. Her crew were rescued by Hannah Symons (United Kingdom). Lurline was on a voyage from Leith, Lothian to Venice, Italy.
HMS Rattler	Royal Navy	The Camelion-class sloop was wrecked on a reef off northern Hokkaido, Japan. Her crew survived.

== 25 September ==
List of shipwrecks: 25 September 1868
Ship	State	Description
Adventure	United Kingdom	The schooner was driven ashore near Weymouth, Dorset. Her crew were rescued. She was refloated and taken in to Weymouth in a leaky condition.
Airdrie	United Kingdom	The schooner was driven ashore at Baldoyle, County Dublin. Her four crew were rescued by the Howth Lifeboat. She was on a voyage from Stranraer, Wigtownshire to Dublin. She was subsequently refloated and taken in to Baldoyle.
Alexander Nevsky	Imperial Russian Navy	Alexander Nevsky The screw frigate was wrecked on a sandbar in the North Sea off Thyborøn, Denmark, with the loss of five lives. Grand Duke Alexei, son of Tsar Alexander II, was on board and survived.
Dolphin	United Kingdom	The steamship ran aground at Donaghadee, County Down. She was on a voyage from Portpatrick, Wigtownshire to Donaghadee. She was refloated the next day.
Generous	United Kingdom	The brig was driven ashore on Ven, Sweden. She was on a voyage from Danzig to Sunderland, County Durham. She was refloated and taken in to Helsingør, Denmark.
Glencoe	United Kingdom	The ship was lost in the Weser. Her crew were rescued. She was on a voyage from a Scottish port to Bremen.
Harkaway	(United Kingdom of Great Britain and Ireland) Isle of Man	The cutter was driven ashore at Leith, Lothian. She was on a voyage from Stettin to Leith. She was refloated and beached at Granton, Lothian.
Instow	United Kingdom	The ship foundered. Her crew were rescued. She was on a voyage from Barnstaple to Fremington, Devon.
Liberty	United Kingdom	The schooner wrecked on the Kimmeridge Ledge, off the coast of Dorset with the loss of all hands. She subsequently drove ashore at St. Alban's Head, Dorset.
Perseverance	France	The sloop was driven ashore and wrecked at Jury's Gap, Sussex, United Kingdom. Her five crew were rescued by the Coastguard using rocket apparatus. She was on a voyage from Dunkirk, Nord to Cherbourg, Seine-Inférieure.
Unnamed	Flag unknown	The schooner foundered in the North Sea off Whitby, Yorkshire, United Kingdom with the loss of all hands.

== 26 September ==
List of shipwrecks: 26 September 1868
Ship	State	Description
Activ	Norway	The schooner was wrecked 1 nautical mile (1.9 km) west of Crail, Fife, United Kingdom. She was on a voyage from Christiania to Glasgow, Renfrewshire, United Kingdom.
Eliza	United Kingdom	The ship was driven ashore at Barry, Glamorgan.
Emma	United Kingdom	The schooner was driven ashore at Redcar, Yorkshire. Her crew were rescued by a number of cobles.
Garside	United Kingdom	The ship was wrecked at Pembrey, Carmarthenshire with the loss of one of her three crew. Survivors were rescued by the Pembrey Lifeboat City of Bath ( Royal National Lifeboat Institution).
Lorenzo	United Kingdom	The ship ran aground at "Point Helen". She was on a voyage from Odesa, Russia to London. She was refloated and taken in to Almería, Spain in a leaky condition.
Marianne McLeod	United Kingdom	The ship was wrecked on the Skeirnafin Rocks, in the Sound of Islay. Her crew were rescued.
Nimrod	United Kingdom	The tug sank at Cardiff, Glamorgan. She was raised on 1 December.
Otto	Bremen	The ship collided with Robinson Crusoe (United Kingdom) and sank in the English Channel 18 nautical miles (33 km) west south west of Beachy Head, Sussex, United Kingdom. Three people were rescued by Robinson Crusoe. Otto was on a voyage from Bordeaux, Gironde, France to Bremen.
Sir Isaac Newton	United Kingdom	The tug sank at Cardiff She was raised on 1 December.
Telegram	Wismar	The ship was driven ashore on Hveen, Sweden. Her crew were rescued. She was on a voyage from Gothenburg, Sweden to Grangemouth, Stirlingshire, United Kingdom. Telegram was refloated on 5 October and taken in to Fredrikshavn, Denmark in a severely damaged condition.

== 27 September ==
List of shipwrecks: 27 September 1868
Ship	State	Description
Gezine Margaretha	Netherlands	The ship was abandoned in the Atlantic Ocean north of Madeira. Her crew were rescued by Peveril of the Peak (United Kingdom). Gezine Margaretha was on a voyage from Bahia, Brazil to Falmouth, Cornwall, United Kingdom.
Impulse	United Kingdom	The schooner was driven ashore at the mouth of the River Tyne. Her seven crew were rescued by rocket apparatus. She was on a voyage from Rochester, Kent to the River Tyne. She subsequently became a wreck.
Two Sisters	United Kingdom	The schooner was driven ashore near Killough, County Down.. She was on a voyage from Belfast, County Antrim to Douglas, Isle of Man. She was refloated and taken in to Killough.
Volunteer	United Kingdom	The steamship was abandoned in the Atlantic Ocean 170 nautical miles (310 km) south west of The Lizard, Cornwall. Her crew were rescued by the schooner Sisters (United Kingdom). Volunteer was on a voyage from Cardiff, Glamorgan to Trieste.

== 28 September ==
List of shipwrecks: 28 September 1868
Ship	State	Description
Blue Vein	United Kingdom	The schooner was driven ashore at Ballybrack, County Dublin. Her four crew were rescued by the Kingstown Lifeboat Princess Royal ( Royal National Lifeboat Institution). Blue Vien was on a voyage from Dublin to Port Madoc, Caernarfonshire.
Eliza Watson	United Kingdom	The schooner was driven ashore and wrecked at Montrose, Forfarshire. Her crew were rescued by the Montrose Lifeboat. She was on a voyage from Sunderland, County Durham to Johnshaven, Aberdeenshire.
Florence	United Kingdom	The steamship sank in the English Channel off the Nab Lightship ( Trinity House) with the loss of six of the 26 people on board. She was on a voyage from Trieste to London.
John and Elizabeth	United Kingdom	The brig was destroyed by fire off Elie, Fife. She was on a voyage from Rotterdam, South Holland, Netherlands to Aberdeen.
Kate Darton	Canada	The barque was destroyed by fire in the Atlantic Ocean (32°50′S 4°20′E). Seven crew were subsequently resported missing in the pinnace. She was on a voyage from Liverpool, Lancashire, United Kingdom to Bombay, India.

== 29 September ==
List of shipwrecks: 29 September 1868
Ship	State	Description
Carnsaw	United Kingdom	The ship was abandoned off Tenby, Pembrokeshire. Her crew were rescued by the Tenby Lifeboat.
Highland Mary	United Kingdom	The ship ran aground and sank off Littleferry, Sutherland. Her crew survived. She was on a voyage from Burghead, Moray to Thurso, Caithness.
Isabella Dobson	United Kingdom	The ship departed from Queenstown, County Cork for Glasgow, Renfrewshire. No further trace, presumed foundered with the loss of all hands.
Jessie	United Kingdom	The smack was wrecked at Hilton of Cadboll, Ross-shire. Her crew were rescued. She was on a voyage from Brora, Sutherland to Bo'ness, Lothian.
Mersey	United Kingdom	The ship was abandoned in the Atlantic Ocean. Her crew were rescued by Isabella (United Kingdom). Mersey was on a voyage from London to the Persian Gulf. She was towed in to Falmouth, Cornwall on 5 October by Delftshaven (Netherlands).
Ocean Queen	United Kingdom	The schooner was run down and sunk in the North Sea off Scarborough, Yorkshire by the schooner Josefina (Russia). Her crew were rescued by Josefina.
Thistle	United Kingdom	The schooner struck the quayside and sank at Aberdeen. She was on a voyage from Blyth, Northumberland to Aberdeen. She was raised on 31 October and placed under repair.
Victoria	United Kingdom	The ship struck the North Rock, in the Belfast Lough, capsized and was wrecked. She was on a voyage from Liverpool, Lancashire to Youghal, County Cork.

== 30 September ==
List of shipwrecks: 30 September 1868
Ship	State	Description
Catherine Cecilia	Prussia	The brig was wrecked at "Valli", in Banderas Bay.
Generous	United Kingdom	The brig was run into by the steamship Garrison (United Kingdom) and sank in the Kattegat. Her crew were rescued. She was on a voyage from Danzig to Newcastle upon Tyne, Northumberland.
Jacinth	United Kingdom	The steamship caught fire 15 nautical miles (28 km) south west by south of the Copeland Islands, County Donegal and was abandoned by her crew. She was on a voyage from Glasgow, Renfrewshire to Liverpool, Lancashire.
John	United Kingdom	The ship was wrecked at Llandudno, Caernarfonshire.

== Unknown date ==
List of shipwrecks: Unknown date in September 1868
Ship	State	Description
Angerstein	United Kingdom	The ship was wrecked on the coast of the Colony of Natal.
Anna Krell	Stettin	The ship ran aground at Swinemünde, Prussia. She was on a voyage from Stettin to Liverpool, Lancashire, United Kingdom.
Antelope	Hamburg	The ship was wrecked in the Gaspar Strait. Her crew were rescued. She was on a voyage from Hamburg to Shanghai, China.
Calpe	United Kingdom	The steamship departed from Lisbon, Portugal on 28 September (Alexandria, Egypt for Liverpool) and seen the following day off the Portuguese coast. Wreckage identified as from Calpe was picked up by a British schooner, possibly named Alecto, on 3 October and taken to Lisbon. Calpe was believed to have foundered with all hands.
Cattofield	United Kingdom	The ship was destroyed by fire at sea before 12 September. Her crew were rescued. She was on a voyage from Leith, Lothian to Penang, Straits Settlements.
Christian	United Kingdom	The ship was wrecked at Saint Vincent. Her crew were rescued. She was on a voyage from Demerara, British Guiana to Falmouth, Cornwall.
Colon	United Kingdom	The ship caught fire and was scuttled at Paramythia, Greece. She was on a voyage from Troon, Ayrshire to Constantinople, Ottoman Empire.
Columbia	United Kingdom	The ship was lost in Easter Sound before 14 September.
Conceicao	Portugal	The troopship, a barque, was wrecked at Sofala, Mozambique.
Dagmar	Russia	The steamship was driven ashore. She was on a voyage from Riga to Reval.
Emma	United Kingdom	The ship ran aground in the Dardanelles. She was on a voyage from Brăila, Ottoman Empire to Falmouth, Cornwall. She was refloated and resumed her voyage.
Florida	United Kingdom	The ship foundered in the English Channel 8 nautical miles (15 km) off St. Alban's Head, Dorset. Her crew were rescued. She was on a voyage from Newport, Monmouthshire to Southampton, Hampshire.
Harriet	United Kingdom	The ship was driven ashore at "Brelotte Point". She was on a voyage from Liverpool to Castries, Hérault, France. She was refloated.
Harry	United Kingdom	The ship was lost whilst on a voyage from Liverpool to Bombay, India.
Harry Emmet	United Kingdom	The ship ran aground in the Dardanelles. She was on a voyage from Galaţi, Ottoman Empire to Falmouth. She was refloated and resumed her voyage.
Hippocampus	United States	The steamship was wrecked in the Great Lakes before 10 September with the loss of 50 lives.
Huron	Canada	The ship was driven ashore on White Island, in the Saint Lawrence River before 22 September. She was on a voyage from Quebec City to Cardiff, Glamorgan, United Kingdom. She was refloated and resumed her voyage.
Lord Sidmouth	United Kingdom	The ship collided with a steamship. She subsequently ran ashore on "Red Island". She was on a voyage from Port Glasgow, Renfrewshire to Quebec City. She was refloated and completed her voyage, arriving on 27 September.
Lunenburg	Canada	The ship was abandoned in the Atlantic Ocean before 21 September. She was on a voyage from a Welsh port to New York, United States. She was subsequently taken in to Halifax, Nova Scotia.
Maria Veronica	United Kingdom	The ship was wrecked off Batavia, Netherlands East Indies.
Mathilde	United Kingdom	The ship was wrecked at Saint Vincent. She was on a voyage from Demerara to Falmouth.
Mountaineer	United Kingdom	The steamship was driven ashore on Iona, Inner Hebrides. She was refloated on 22 September.
Neptune	(United Kingdom of Great Britain and Ireland) New South Wales	The ship was wrecked on a reef in the Timor Sea before 10 September. Her crew too to the boats; they were rescued by the steamship Boomerang ( (United Kingdom of Great Britain and Ireland) New South Wales). Neptune was on a voyage from Shanghai, China to Newcastle.
Nora	United Kingdom	The barque collided with the steamship Mersey and sank before 26 September. Her crew were rescued. She was on a voyage from South Shields, County Durham to a Mediterranean port.
Ottawa	United Kingdom	The steamship ran aground in the Strait of Belle Isle and was damaged. Her passengers were taken off by the steamship Austrian (United Kingdom). Ottawa was on a voyage from Quebec City to Liverpool. She was refloated on 15 September and taken in to Saint John's, Newfoundland Colony.
Souvenir	Hamburg	The ship was abandoned in the North Sea in late September. Her crew were rescued. She was on a voyage from Burntisland, Fife, United Kingdom to Hamburg.
Sundsvall	Sweden	The ship was wrecked on Cross Island, Russia. She was on a voyage from Arkhangelsk to Plymouth, Devon, United Kingdom.
Sunny South	United States	The ship was destroyed by fire before 28 September. She was on a voyage from Philadelphia, Pennsylvania to Bremen.
Tom Vokes	United Kingdom	The ship exploded, caught fire and sank. Three survivors were rescued by Yedlitz (Prussia). Tom Vokes was on a voyage from Hamburg to Saint Petersburg, Russia.
Una	United Kingdom	The steamship was severely damaged by fire in mid-September. She was on a voyage from Malta to Constantinople.
