= Tavistock Canal =

Canal in Devon, England

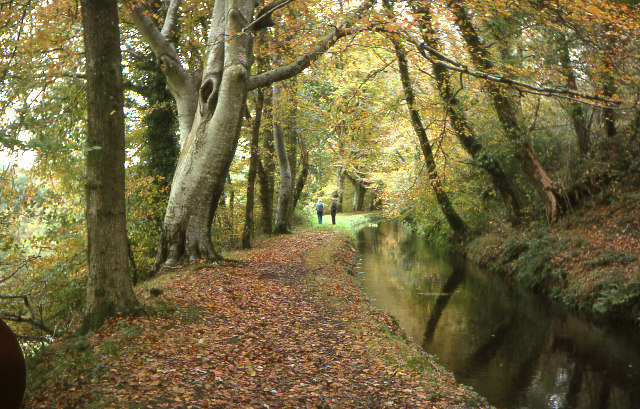
- The Tavistock Canal, in the Lumburn Valley

Specifications
- Status: Water supply for hydro electric plant

History
- Original owner: Tavistock Canal Co
- Principal engineer: John Taylor
- Date of act: 1803
- Date of first use: 1805
- Date completed: 1817
- Date closed: 1880s

Geography
- Start point: Tavistock
- End point: Morwellham Quay
- Branch: Mill Hill quarry

The Tavistock Canal is a canal in the county of Devon in England. It was constructed early in the 19th century to link the town of Tavistock to Morwellham Quay on the River Tamar, where cargo could be loaded into ships. The canal is still in use to supply water to a hydro-electric power plant at Morwellham Quay, and forms part of the Cornwall and West Devon Mining Landscape World Heritage Site. It is unusual for a canal, as it has a gentle slope over its length, resulting in a considerable flow of water.

== History ==
Morwellham Quay is on the River Tamar, and although it is about 23 miles (37 km) from the sea, the river is still tidal there. The quay was the furthest point inland to which the river was navigable, and it had served Tavistock as a port since the 12th century. Ships of 200 tons were using the quay by 1800, and there was a growing trade in copper, which was being mined locally, particularly since the Wheal Friendship mine had opened around 1797. In 1802, John Taylor, a local civil engineer with interests in the mining of metal ores, surveyed the route for a canal to run from Tavistock to Morwellham, and it was discussed at a meeting in March 1803 in Tavistock. The canal would be 16 feet (4.9 m) wide and 3 feet (0.9 m) deep, and the Millhill slate quarries would be served by a branch from the main line. It would carry copper ore, from both the Wheal Friendship and the Wheal Crowndale mine which had recently opened nearer to Tavistock. Other cargo would include slate, limestone and general goods. The canal would be suitable for tub boats, and would be built entirely on land owned by the Duke of Bedford, who approved of the project. The estimated cost was £40,000, which included provision for testing any mineral lodes which were found during its construction, and the rights to those minerals, together with dues payable to the Duke for their extraction, were negotiated before the project began.

Tavistock Canal Act 1803
- Act of Parliament
- Parliament of the United Kingdom
- Long title: An Act for making and maintaining a navigable Canal from and out of the River Tamar, at or near Morwellham Quay, to the Town of Tavistock; and also a certain Collateral Cut to lead from the said Canal to Mill Hill Bridge, in the County of Devon.
- Citation: 43 Geo. 3. c. cxxx
- Territorial extent: United Kingdom

Dates
- Royal assent: 27 July 1803
- Commencement: 27 July 1803 (Note: The Acts of Parliament (Commencement) Act 1793.)

Status: Current legislation

Text of statute as originally enacted

An act of Parliament, the Tavistock Canal Act 1803 (43 Geo. 3. c. cxxx), was obtained which gave the proprietors the power to raise £50,000 in £50 shares for the construction of the canal. The land was donated by the Duke, who took 125 of the 1,000 shares. Taylor, who also managed Wheal Friendship mine, acted as engineer, and work started in August 1803. The largest engineering feature of the canal was a tunnel under Morwell Down. When cutting of it began, copper ore was discovered close to the Tavistock end, and this became the Wheal Crebor mine, which was managed as a separate project. It had its own entrance, by the tunnel entrance, and used water-powered machinery, driven by water flowing along the canal. The canal from Tavistock to the tunnel mouth, including an aqueduct which carried it over the River Lumburn, was opened in 1805. The 2,540-yard (2.32 km) tunnel was cut through rock, was of small bore, and required Taylor to construct two types of pump, one to keep the workings drained, and the other to clean the air. Both were powered by water wheels, driven by the canal water. The tunnel, which was driven through elvan rock and killas clay-slate, is 360 feet (110 m) below Morwell Down at its deepest point, and it was finished in 1816.

At the tunnel's southern end, the canal was on the 250-foot (76 m) contour, and Taylor constructed an inclined plane to drop the level by 237 feet (72 m) to the quay at Morwellham. There were two tracks, one running to the quay, and a second which ended some 30 feet (9.1 m) higher at ore-chutes above the Lower Copper Quay. The rails were initially L-shaped cast-iron plate rails, spaced 46 inches (1,200 mm) apart between the flanges, although trough-shaped rails were used in places on the quay, particularly where roads crossed the tracks. Four-wheeled tipping wagons which had larger wheels at the front than at the rear were used on the twin tracks, which operated independently. The system was powered by a large overshot waterwheel, 28 feet (8.5 m) in diameter and 4 feet (1.2 m) wide, situated alongside the winding house at the head of the incline, which was fed with water from the canal. It drove a declutchable winch, to which the wagons were attached by chains. Wagons arriving at the top of the incline passed onto a sloping platform, which moved to a horizontal position due to the weight of the wagon, and this disconnected the waterwheel from the drum holding the chain. The rails were later replaced by wrought iron edge rails, and the chains by cables.

=== Opening ===
The main line of the canal was formally opened on 24 June 1817; this was marked by ships on the River Tamar firing a 21-gun salute. A "persistent legend" states that much of the construction work had been done by French prisoners of war, but the canal committee's annual account of construction progress makes no reference to this. The canal is unusual in that it was built with a gentle slope of about 1 ft per mile (20 cm per km). This was designed to attract industry to its banks, as it resulted in a flow of water along the canal, which aided the passage of boats towards the quay, and also helped to power waterwheels along the route. Between 1817 and 1819, a 2-mile (3.2 km) extension was constructed to slate quarries and a general wharf at Mill Hill. This cost £8,000, and because there was a lack of water to supply locks, the difference in level was accommodated by building a counterbalanced, double track inclined plane. Boats were loaded onto cradles, and the loaded boats passing down the incline raised the unladen ones, with three horses assisting if necessary. The incline was relatively shallow, as it was 936 feet (285 m) long and only rose by 19.5 feet (5.9 m) over this length. The rails were of "L" section, made of cast iron, and spaced 70.5 inches (1.79 m) between the flanges. The cradle was about 20 feet (6.1 m) long and ran on 24-inch (0.61 m) cast iron wheels. The branch appears to have closed around 1831, but in 1844, the owners of a new slate quarry at Mill Hill requested that the company re-open the canal or replace it with a tramway. The canal above the Gunnislake to Tavistock road crossing was relaid as a tramway at a cost of £1,381, but the quarry was not a success, and only shipped slates between 1848 and 1850.

Despite its modest length, the canal's design and execution was a remarkable achievement, owing much to the foresight and determination of John Taylor. Driving a tunnel of such length through solid and often hard rock required new drainage techniques, and finishing it off with "the greatest inclined plane in Southern England" required great boldness. It carried slate, silver-lead ore and copper ore from the Tavistock area to the quay, and general goods including limestone, coal, iron and timber for Tavistock in the reverse direction. For nearly 40 years it was a profitable concern, carrying over one million tons of cargo during this period.

=== Decline ===
In 1844, the largest lode of copper ore in Europe was discovered just 4 miles (6.4 km) from Morwellham Quay, but the canal was unable to profit from the discovery, as the ore, which was mined by the Devon Great Consols company, lay in a different direction from the canal. However, in 1857–58 the mining company built a tramway from the mine to the quay. It arrived above the quay on the 400-foot (120 m) contour, and a second inclined plane was constructed, which ran through a tunnel beneath the village green.

Tavistock Canal Act 1873
- Act of Parliament
- Parliament of the United Kingdom
- Long title: An Act for transferring the Undertaking of the Company of Proprietors of the Tavistock Canal to the Duke of Bedford; and for other purposes.
- Citation: 36 & 37 Vict. c. xvi
- Territorial extent: United Kingdom

Dates
- Royal assent: 15 May 1873
- Commencement: 15 May 1873

Status: Current legislation

In 1859, the railways arrived at Tavistock, in the form of the South Devon and Tavistock Railway. In order to remain competitive, £300 was spent on renewing the equipment on the inclined plane, and thought was given to buying a tug. However, Mr T. Knight proposed a system of ropes powered by waterwheels to pull the boats through the tunnel, and the machinery was installed. After less than a year it was acknowledged that the system was a failure, but the committee failed to find a way to dispose of the rope, although they tried for many years. Traffic and profits continued to fall, despite reductions in the tolls. The company petitioned the duke in 1866 to reduce tolls for the use of Morwellham Quay, but he did not respond. In 1870, they offered all of the shares to the duke, at a price of £10 each, but again the duke did not show interest. Two years later, the duke made an offer of £8 per share, providing that the company paid half of the cost of an act of Parliament to authorise transfer of ownership to him. This was accepted, and the Tavistock Canal Act 1873 (36 & 37 Vict. c. xvi) was obtained in May 1873, after which the duke paid £3,200 to the shareholders. Although he had no responsibility to keep the canal open, it was listed as being open in official returns for 1883, but not in 1898.

== Boats ==
None of the boats used on the canal has survived completely, but a wrought iron rudder found in the tunnel in 1976 is on display at Morwellham Quay Museum and recent archaeological survey work has found more wrought iron plates within the canal tunnel. A report from 1888 describes the boats as 30 feet (9.1 m) in length, 5 feet (1.5 m) in width, and made of rivetted iron, while an earlier description from 1826 gives the dimensions as 4 feet 6 inches (1.37 m) wide by 2 feet 6 inches (0.76 m) deep.

These iron barges were first referred to in 1811, when one was launched on the canal on Easter Monday. In all, nine were built between then and 1817, when 300 invited guests were carried along the canal in them on the occasion of the grand opening. They are of considerable international importance as they appear to be the earliest boats of any sort to have been built of wrought iron, the second earliest having been launched on the Forth & Clyde Canal in 1816. The earliest iron boat of all, built in 1787 and launched on the River Severn by John Wilkinson of Broseley Ironworks, Shropshire, is now thought to have been of cast iron plates, bolted together.

== The route ==
The main line of the canal starts at the Abbey Weir in Tavistock, where water is taken from the River Tavy. Passing through wharfs in Tavistock, it proceeds towards Morwellham Quay in a fairly straight line, with a large horseshoe loop when it meets the valley of the River Lumburn, which it crosses by a large aqueduct. The two mile Mill Hill branch turned off immediately after the aqueduct. After about 3 miles (4.8 km) the main line reaches the northern portal of the Morwell Down tunnel, which emerges 1.5 miles (2.4 km) later above the quay. A short length of canal after the tunnel brought boats to the top of the inclined plane.

== Today ==
After the canal closed to navigation it continued to be used to supply water to various industrial activities at Morwellham Quay. The last of these was to operate a tin and wolfram mill at the Bedford United Mine, a supply which ceased in 1930. In 1933 the canal was purchased by the West Devon Electric Supply Co. Ltd, who constructed a hydro-electric power plant at Morwellham Quay using the canal and tunnel as a water supply. The power plant and canal now belong to South West Water, and still feed power to the National Grid.

A programme of archaeological and historical research was carried out around Morwellham Quay between 2002 and 2010. Excavations in 2006–2007 uncovered the tunnel on the second inclined plane, part of which is now being restored. Morwellham Quay is now an open-air museum. Part of the Mill Hill Branch of the canal still survives, from the junction near the Lumburn aqueduct to the A390 Tavistock to Liskeard road. The bed can be seen along this length, although it is dry. The next section is marked by the tramroad that ran to Millhill crossroads, but the canal bed is not obvious. Beyond the road, there is no evidence of the inclined plane, nor of the route from the top of the incline to the quarry.

== Points of interest ==
Point	Coordinates (Links to map resources)	OS Grid Ref	Notes
Abbey Weir, Tavistock	50.5488°N 4.1439°W	SX482743	start of canal
Shillamill viaduct	50.5290°N 4.1656°W	SX466721	old railway
Junction with Mill Hill Branch	50.5328°N 4.1718°W	SX461725	
Mill Hill Quarries	50.5483°N 4.1838°W	SX453743	
Northern portal of tunnel	50.5303°N 4.1725°W	SX461723	
Southern portal of tunnel	50.5118°N 4.1890°W	SX448702	
Incline head	50.5096°N 4.1954°W	SX444700	
Incline foot	50.5075°N 4.1949°W	SX444698	Morwellham Quay

== See also ==
- Canals of Great Britain
- History of the British canal system

== Bibliography ==
- Awdry, Christopher (1990). Encyclopaedia of British Railway Companies. London: Patrick Stephens. ISBN 978-1-85260-049-5.
- Booker, Frank (1971). "The Tavistock Canal". The Industrial Archaeology of the Tamar Valley (2nd ed.). OCLC 164547169.
- Braid, Douglas (1992). John Wilkinson's Iron Boat. Wilkinson Studies Vol II.
- Greeves, Tom (April 2003). "The Tavistock Canal - A Review" (PDF). Tamar Valley Service. Archived from the original (PDF) on 27 September 2007.
- Hadfield, Charles (1967). The Canals of South West England. Newton Abbot: David & Charles. ISBN 978-0-7153-4176-6.
- Otter, R A (1993). Civil Engineering Heritage: Southern England. Thomas Telford. ISBN 978-0-7277-1971-3.
- Priestley, Joseph (1831). Historical Account of the Navigable Rivers, Canals, and Railways of Great Britain. Longman, Rees, Orme, Brown and Green. Archived from the original on 4 March 2016.
- Russell, Ronald (1971). Lost Canals of England and Wales. Newton Abbot: David & Charles. ISBN 978-0-7153-5417-9.
- Von Oeynhausen, Carl; Von Dechen, Heinrich (1971). Railways in England 1826 & 1827. Transl. Forward, E.A. W Heffer & Sons (for Newcomen Society). ISBN 978-0-85270-048-8.
- Waterhouse, Robert (2017). The Tavistock Canal: its history and archaeology. Trevithick Society. ISBN 978-0-9935021-4-9.
