= Tamar–Tavy Estuary =

- Site of Special Scientific Interest
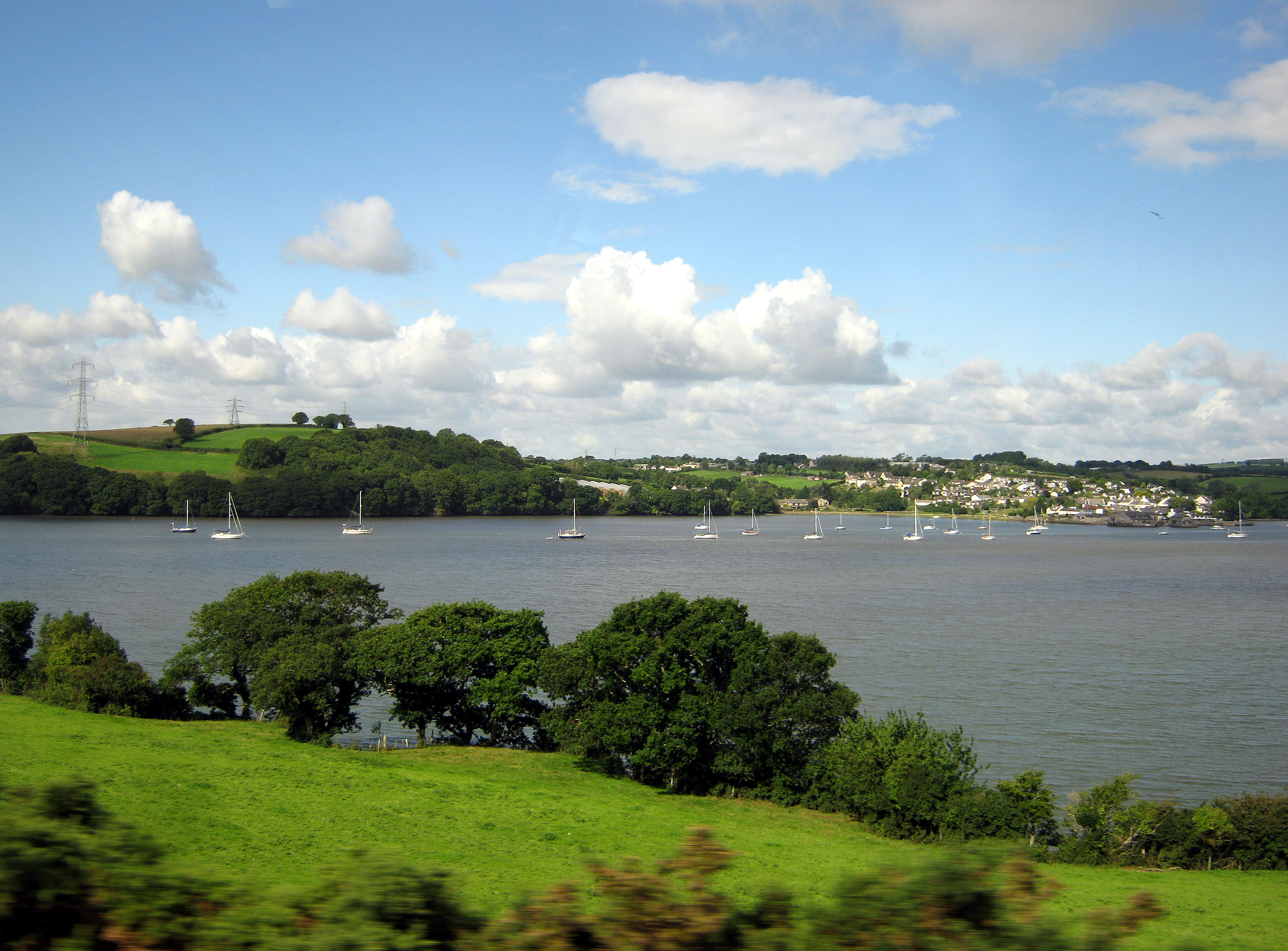
- View across the Tamar estuary south of Bere Ferrers, looking towards Cargreen

- Location within Cornwall Location within England
- Location of Tamar–Tavy Estuary.
- Area of search: Cornwall, Devon
- Grid reference: SX435591
- Coordinates: 50.4113°N 4.2032°W
- Interest: Biological
- Area: 1,422.3 hectares (14.2 km^{2}; 5.49 sq mi)
- Notification date: 1991

The Tamar–Tavy Estuary is a Site of Special Scientific Interest (SSSI) covering the tidal estuaries of the River Tamar and the River Tavy on the border between Cornwall and Devon in England, UK. Parts of the land designated as the Tamar–Tavy Estuary SSSI are owned by the National Trust and parts are owned by the Ministry of Defence and the Diocese of Truro also owns land in this SSSI. Part of the Tamar estuary also forms the Tamar Estuary Nature Reserve, owned by the Cornwall Wildlife Trust. The site was designated in 1991 for its biodiversity and varying habitats that support many wader and wildfowl species, as well as the special interest of its marine biology.

== Geography ==
The 1,422-hectare (3,510-acre) SSSI encompasses the entirety of the tidal regions of the Tamar; from Gunnislake down to the Tamar Bridge in the south, where it forms the Hamoaze, and the River Tavy from Lopwell to its discharge in the Tamar. The site also includes Kingsmill Lake, Tamerton Lake and a few other tributary streams of the Tamar, as well as the marshes around Morwellham Quay.

The site forms part of the Tamar Estuaries Complex Special Protection Area (SPA), along with the estuary of the River Lynher and St John's Lake, as well as forming part of the Plymouth Sound and Estuaries Special Area of Conservation (SAC).

The Cornwall Wildlife Trust owns the 109 hectares (270 acres) Tamar Estuary nature reserve around Kingsmill Lake, below Landulph, and Lopwell Dam is a Local Nature Reserve, covering the dam and surrounding woodlands.

== Wildlife and ecology ==
The SSSI, due to its habitats, is of international importance for nature conservation, in particular as a wintering site for wildfowl and wader birds.

Mudflats form the lower reaches of the estuary system and are bordered by salt marsh, inundation grassland and rocky shoreline habitats. These mainly contain common saltmarsh-grass (Puccinellia maritima), red fescue and sea couch, as well as two nationally scarce species of grass: stiff saltmarsh-grass (Puccinellia rupestris) and bulbous foxtail. The upstream part of the system supports freshwater marsh, fen, rush pasture and reedmarsh habitats, along with wooded valleys in places. Species include the common reed and the only known population in the British Isles of triangular club-rush, part of the genus Schoenoplectus.

The mudflats attract more than 20% of the British wintering population of the uncommon pied avocet. They additionally support black-tailed godwit, common redshank, dunlin, whimbrel, greenshank, spotted redshank and green sandpiper during the wintering period, with the first birds arriving in October and leaving again throughout March.

The highly variable salinity along the transition from marine estuary to river allows for a diverse marine culture. Seaweeds, green algae and communities of polychaete worms are all found in the estuary system; near Calstock is found the shrimp Palaemon longirostris, which has been recorded in only two other estuaries in Britain. The estuary is also one of only two sites in the UK where the fish, allis shad, spawn.

Other larger animals found in undisturbed parts of the SSSI include the European otter, the common kingfisher and dormice.

== Gallery ==
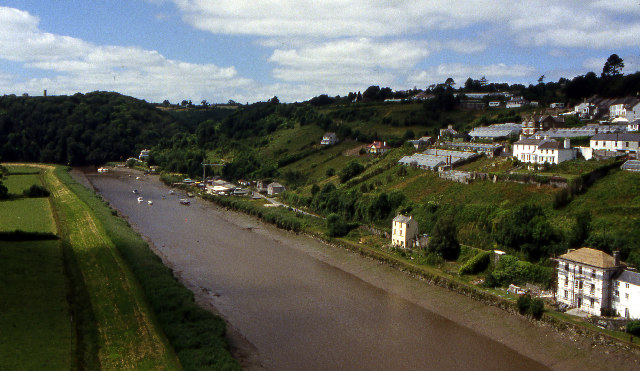
River Tamar from Calstock Viaduct

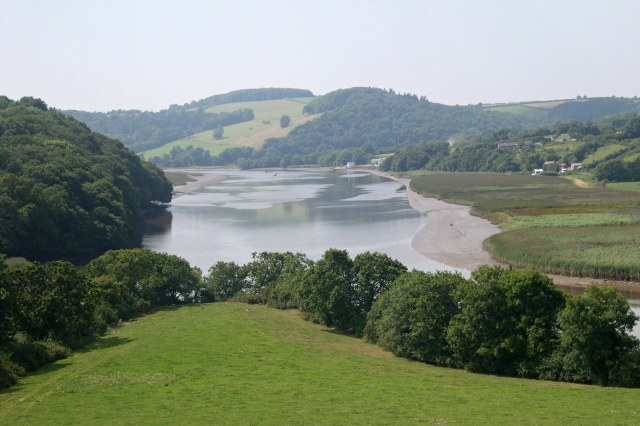
Mudflats and salt marshes on the lower reaches of the estuary system

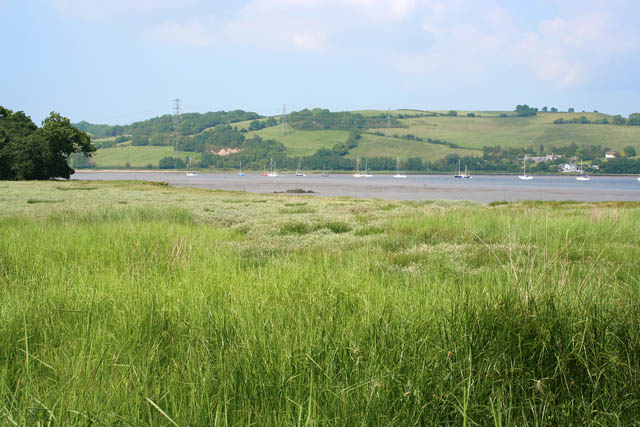
Salt marsh on a lower bank of the River Tamar

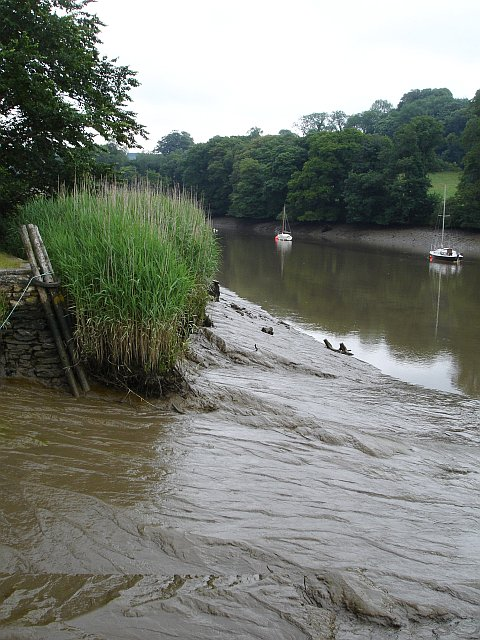
A reedmarsh on the upper reaches of the Tamar, at Cotehele

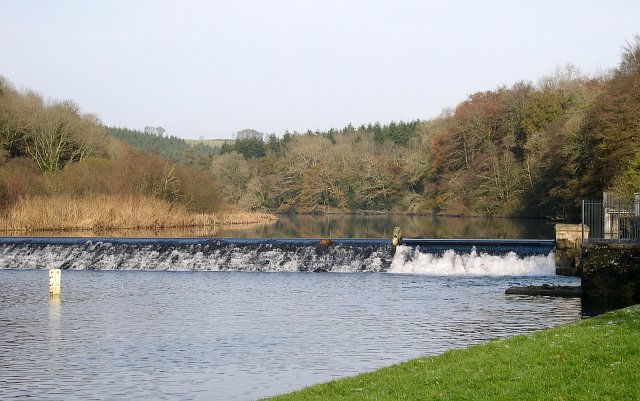
The Lopwell Dam, a weir that is the tidal limit of the River Tavy
