= New Quay (Devon) =

Abandoned port hamlet in Devon, England

UNESCO World Heritage Site
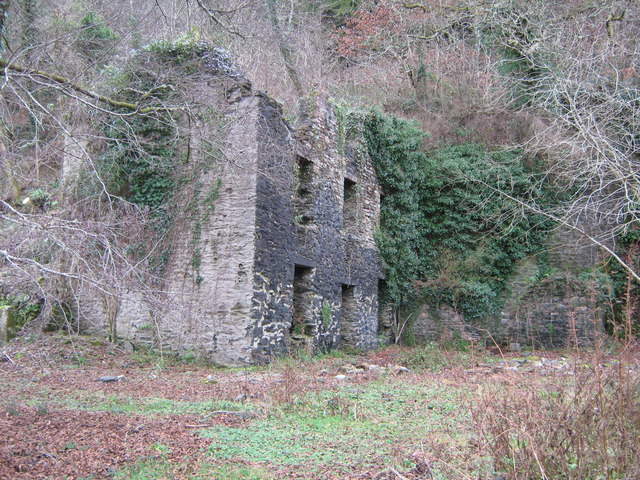
- Abandoned building at New Quay

- Location within Devon Location within the United Kingdom
- Location: Gulworthy, West Devon, Devon, United Kingdom
- Part of: "Tamar Valley Mining District" part of Cornwall and West Devon Mining Landscape
- Criteria: Cultural: (ii)(iii)(iv)
- Reference: 1215-010i
- Inscription: 2006 (30th Session)
- Coordinates: 50°30′18″N 4°10′52″W

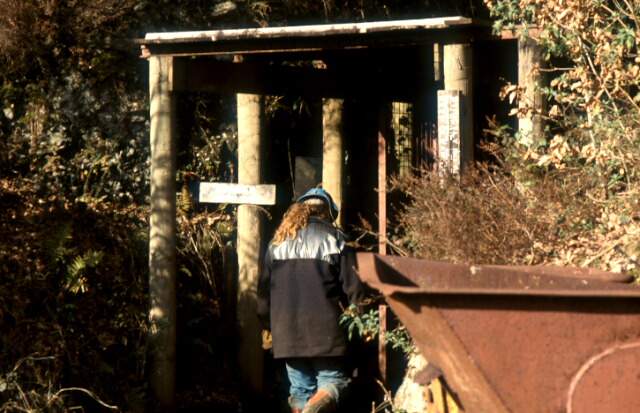
Entrance to George and Charlotte copper mine

New Quay is a small once industrial abandoned hamlet and intensive mining port on the steep, winding banks of the River Tamar in Devon. New Quay village is immediately east of and downstream of the similar port of Morwellham Quay (now the heart of an open-air museum). New Quay was an important copper, tin and later arsenic port serving the local mines including the George and Charlotte Mine, Bedford Consolidated Mine and Gawton Arsenic Mine. Since July 2006 New Quay is within the World Heritage Site that is the Cornwall and West Devon Mining Landscape.

== History ==
The closest mines to New Quay are the Gawton Arsenic Mine, a scheduled ancient monument, Bedford Consolidated Mine and the George and Charlotte Mine. Across the water was Harewood Consolidated Mine. On the eastern high ridge were Tavy Consolidated Mine, East and West Liscombe and Wheal Tamar Copper Mines, and the William and Mary Mine.

As with Morwellham, the whole area is in the south of the highly scattered late 19th century parish of Gulworthy, today a civil parish and a small contributor parish to an ecclesiastical benefice in the Church of England, previously a hamlet of Tavistock. The mining families in the community were split between the established church and other sects of Protestantism - the then small town of Bere Alston to the south having had chapels or meeting houses for these in 1887 including a Presbyterian Church in 1822.

It to an extent benefited from the short but major engineering feat of the Tavistock Canal, forming a junction with the Tamar at Morwellham quay, completed in June 1817 with a tunnel of 1.75 miles (2.82 km) altogether built at an expense of £68,000 (equivalent to £5,037,000 in 2025) being in engineering and in export of ores a remarkable achievement before its decline in the 1860s.

An account of the county in 1818 states "the Tamar is navigable to New Quay...for vessels of about 130 or 140 tons: vessels of fourteen feet draught go up to Morwell-ham quay, six miles from Plymouth" — the first distance appears to be an error.

Since the village was abandoned in the early 20th century it became overgrown and large cut masonry stones from the quay were stolen. In 2008 work was begun to halt New Quay's further destruction: many of the buildings were stabilised and repaired and much of the undergrowth was cut back.

== Today ==
Trains on the mine tramway from Morwellham stop at new Quay with local guides to show structures and explain the mining and cultural activities of the valley.

The site can be visited without guides on foot and further public access is planned for the future.
