= Plymouth Sound =

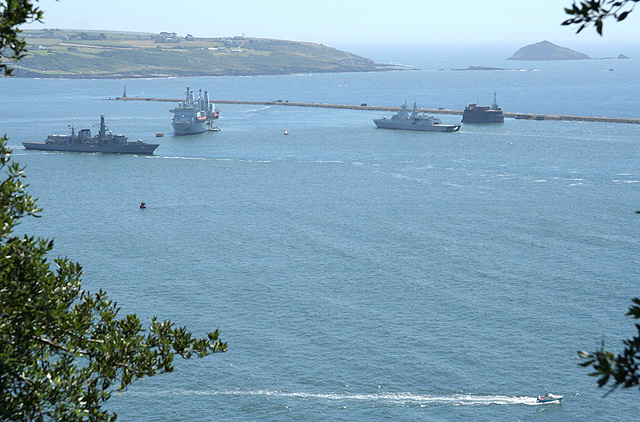
- Image of the Breakwater and the Mewstone

- Location within Devon
- Coordinates: 50°21′34.8″N 4°8′34.8″W
- Type: Bay
- Primary inflows: Hamoaze
- River sources: River Tamar; River Lynher; River Tiddy; River Plym; River Tavy; River Inny; River Burn; River Wallabrooke; River Lumburn; River Walkham
- Primary outflows: English Channel
- Max. length: 6 kilometres (3.7 mi)
- Max. width: 6 kilometres (3.7 mi)

Plymouth Sound, or locally just The Sound, is a deep inlet or sound in the English Channel near Plymouth in England.

== Description ==
Its southwest and southeast corners are Penlee Point in Cornwall and Wembury Point in Devon, a distance of about 3 nautical miles (6 km). Its northern limit is Plymouth Hoe giving a north–south distance of nearly 3 nautical miles (6 km).

The Sound has three water entrances. The marine entrance is from the English Channel to the south, with a deep-water channel to the west of the Plymouth Breakwater. There are two freshwater inlets: one, from the northwest, is from the River Tamar via the Hamoaze and Devonport Dockyard, the largest naval dockyard in western Europe. The other, at northeast, is from the River Plym disgorging into its narrow estuary, Cattewater harbour between Mount Batten and the Royal Citadel.

In the centre of the Sound, midway between Bovisand Bay and Cawsand Bay, is Plymouth Breakwater, which creates a harbour protecting anchored ships from the frequent south-western storms. The breakwater is around 1,700 yards (1,600 m) long, stands in around 11 metres / 36 feet of water and was built by John Rennie and Joseph Whidbey starting in 1812. The breakwater has a 23-metre-tall (75 ft) lighthouse on its western end and a 9-metre-tall (30 ft) beacon with a spherical cage on top at the eastern end. It is said that the cage is a lifesaving device designed to keep wrecked sailors from drowning in the huge waves of a storm on the low-lying breakwater.

Drake's Island is 400 metres long and around 100 metres wide and situated at the north of the Sound. It was fortified to defend Drake's Channel, the only deep-water route to Devonport. The Bridge is a shallow reef that links Drake's Island and the Cornish mainland. At low water the depth of the Bridge can be less than one metre but at high water it can rise to 5 metres. In World War I this natural barrier was supplemented by other obstructions to prevent submarines and small ships attacking the naval base.

== Usage ==
In addition to ships of the Royal Navy, large commercial vessels, including ferries to France and Spain use the Sound from Millbay Docks. Fishing vessels use it from Sutton Harbour beside the old town of Plymouth, called the Barbican. There are marinas at Sutton Harbour, Mount Wise in the Hamoaze and at Turnchapel. Waterborne traffic in the Sound is controlled by the King’s Harbour Master for Plymouth.

== History ==
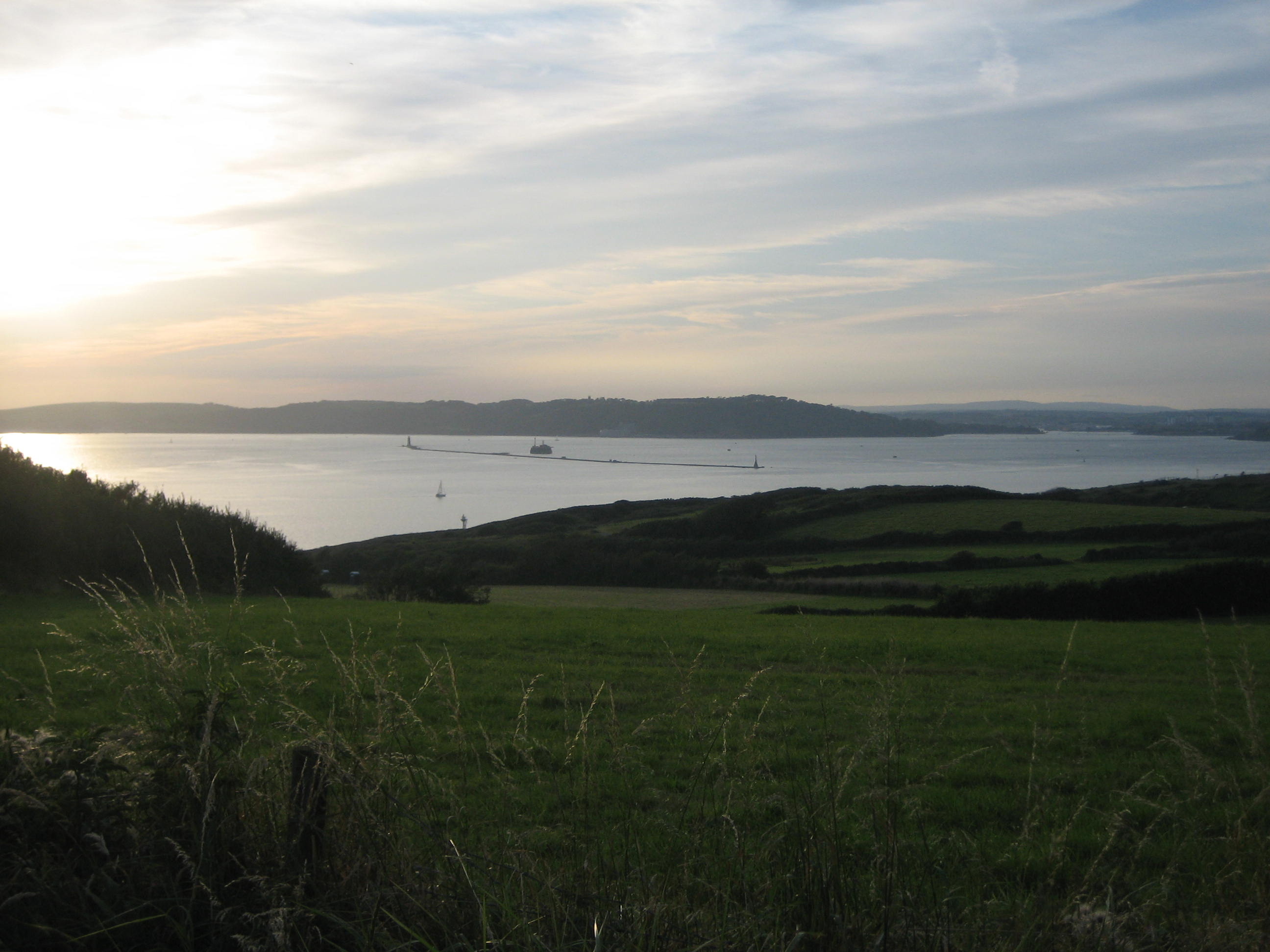
Plymouth Sound from Heybook Bay

Mount Batten, a former Royal Air Force flying boat and search and rescue base, is located at the northeast corner of the Sound. T. E. Lawrence was stationed here under the moniker Aircraftman Shaw.

Over the years, the Sound has been defended by Drake's Island, Picklecombe Fort, Cawsand Fort, the Breakwater Fort, Fort Bovisand, Staddon Fort and Stamford Fort.

A harbour and reservoir were built at Bovisand before the fort existed to supply men-o-war anchored in the Sound with fresh water. Joseph Whidbey supervised the building of the Breakwater from Bovisand Lodge, from which there is a view down the full length of the breakwater.

The Titanic was due to have docked here briefly on its return voyage to Britain, and the ship had a painting of Plymouth Sound on board.

As of 2019, there is a campaign to create the first National Marine Park in Britain off Plymouth Sound.

=== Notable events ===
- The English Fleet assembled in 1355: by Edward of Woodstock, the Black Prince, Duke of Cornwall, departed to the Battle of Poitiers
- The Pelican 15 November 1577: departed on Sir Francis Drake's circumnavigation
- The Mayflower 1620, bearing the Pilgrim Fathers

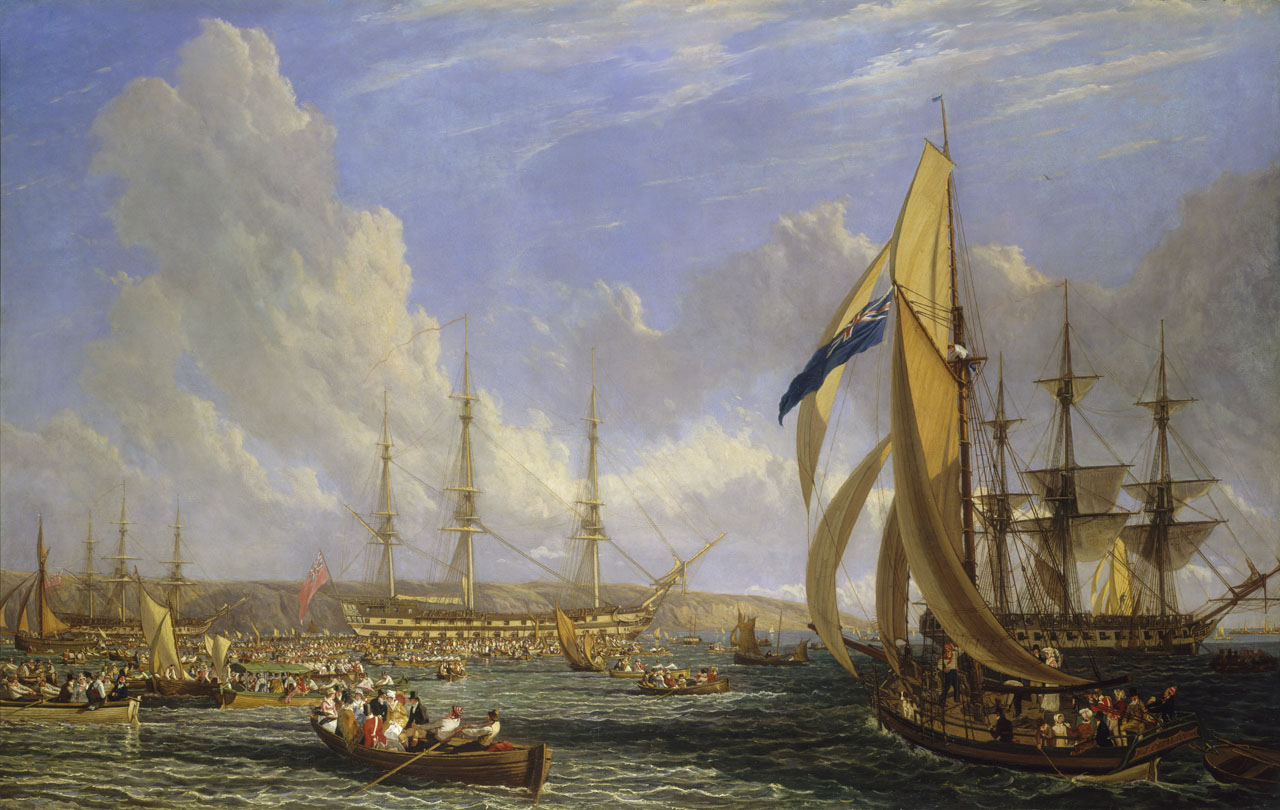
Scene in Plymouth Sound in August 1815 by J. J. Chalon, oil on canvas

- The ill-fated Cádiz expedition of 1625 and siege of Saint-Martin-de-Ré of 1627. Returning servicemen brought disease and looting to Plymouth reducing its population by over 20%
- The first recorded submarine fatality in history occurred in the Sound in June 1774, when a carpenter named John Day perished north of Drake's Island while testing a wooden diving chamber attached to the sloop Maria.
- Following his surrender to Captain Frederick Maitland of HMS Bellerophon off Rochefort in 1815, Napoleon was taken to Plymouth Sound where he remained on board, 26 July – 4 August, while his future was decided. This event caused a local and national sensation as thousands took to the water; several paintings in London's National Maritime Museum document the event, such as the one shown here.
- On 27 December 1831, HMS Beagle set off from anchorage in the Barn Pool, under Mount Edgecumbe on the west side of Plymouth Sound, on her second survey voyage, captained by Robert FitzRoy with Charles Darwin on board.
- Departing on 27 August 1966 and arriving on 28 May 1967, Francis Chichester became the first person to sail single-handed around the world by the clipper route.

The Sound has been the site of a number of aircraft crashes and shipwrecks:

- Die Fraumetta Catharina von Flensburg, a 53-ton brigantine, sank near Drake's Island in December 1786.
- P&O ship Nepaul sank on the Shagstone in December 1890.
- A Short Sunderland flying boat crashed while landing in bad weather on 15 October 1939, killing four of the eleven passengers and crew.
- A Short Sunderland flying boat crashed in March 1942 between the Breakwater Fort and the breakwater lighthouse killing five passengers.
- In February 1943, a Lancaster bomber hit the cable of a barrage balloon and crashed without survivors on the return from a raid on the U-boat pens at Lorient.
- In 1970, the Glen Strathallan luxury steam yacht was scuttled near the Shagstone as a site for scuba diving. This ship's triple expansion steam engine is now on display in the Science Museum, London.

== Bibliography ==
- Moseley, Brian (2013). "Plymouth Breakwater". plymouthdata.info. Plymouth Data: The Encyclopaedia of Plymouth History. Archived from the original on 17 May 2013.
