= River Burn =

River Burn may refer to:

- The River Burn, Devon, a tributary of the River Tavy on Dartmoor in the county of Devon, England
- The River Burn, Norfolk, which flows into the North Sea at Burnham Overy Staithe in the county of Norfolk, England
- The River Burn, North Yorkshire, tributary of the River Ure
