= Hippocampus (disambiguation) =

The hippocampus is an anatomical subdivision of the brain, so named for its physical resemblance to a seahorse.

Hippocampus or Hippocamp may also refer to:

- Hippocampus (fish), the seahorse genus
- Hippocampus (journal), an academic publication
- Hippocampus (mythology) or hippocamp, a mythological creature typically depicted as having the upper body of a horse with the lower body of a fish
- Hippocampus Press, publisher of works related to H. P. Lovecraft
- USS Hippocampus, a yacht leased by the U.S. Navy during World War I
- Hippocamp (moon), a natural satellite of Neptune
- Hippo Campus, an American indie rock band
- SS Hippocampus (built 1867), American ship

== See also ==
- Hippocampus minor, former name for the calcar avis
- Hippocampus Well, 1906 fountain by Niels Skovgaard in Copenhagen
- "Big Man on Hippocampus", 2010 episode of Family Guy season 8
- Hippopotamus, semi-aquatic mammals
