= Lopwell =

Coordinates: 50.4643°N 4.1506°W

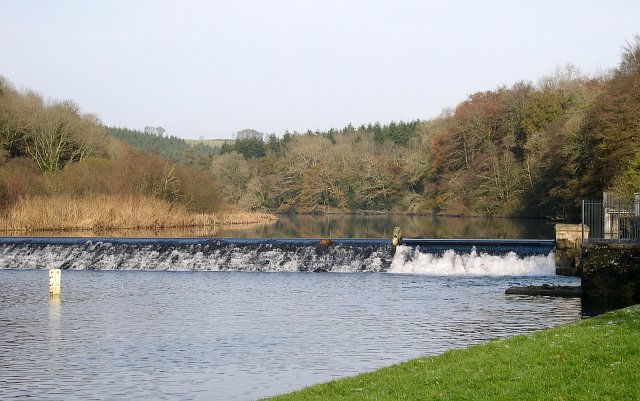
The dam, or weir, at Lopwell

Lopwell is a site of natural beauty situated at the normal tidal limit of the River Tavy, 3 miles from north Plymouth and 7 miles from Tavistock, Devon, England.

Lopwell Dam is a Local Nature Reserve consisting of several different habitats including saltmarsh, freshwater marsh and ancient semi-natural woodland. Mammals include roe deer, otters and Atlantic grey seals. The area forms part of the Tamar–Tavy Estuary Site of Special Scientific Interest
