= Collybrooke =

Stream on Dartmoor in Devon, England

Coordinates: 50.5787°N 4.1076°W

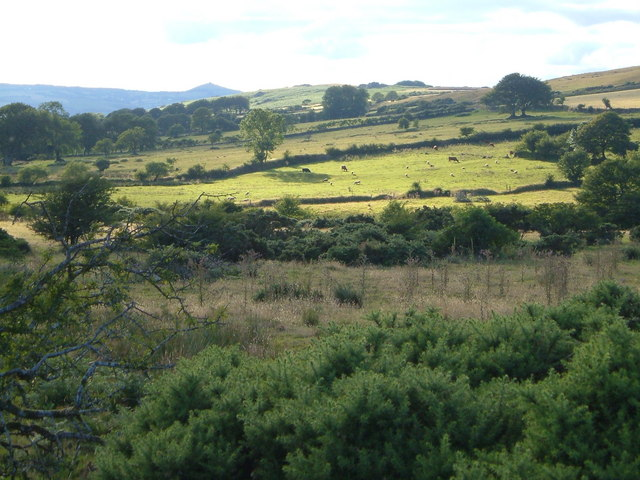
View of Colly Brook valley

The Collybrooke or Colly Brook is a brook on Dartmoor in Devon, England. It is a tributary of the River Tavy.

== Bibliography ==
- The Painted Stream, Robin Armstrong, Dent, 1985, ISBN 0-460-04702-7

== See also ==
- Rivers of the United Kingdom
