= River Wallabrooke =

River on Dartmoor in Devon, England

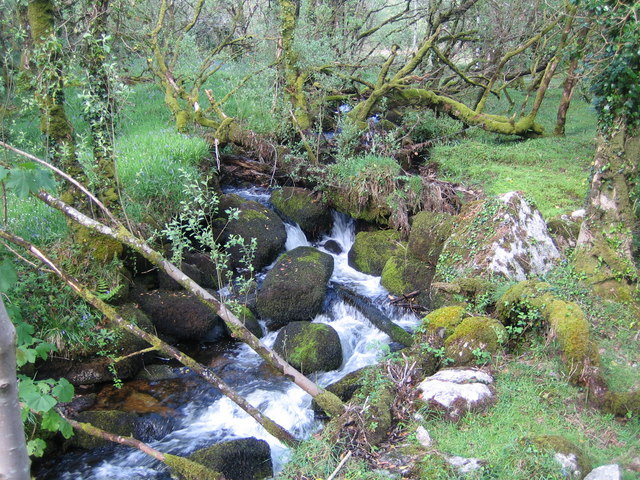
- View of the Walla Brook River

- Location within Devon Location within the United Kingdom

Location
- Country: England
- County: Devon

Physical characteristics
- Mouth: River Tavy
  - coordinates: 50.5608°N 4.1380°W

The Wallabrook is a river on Dartmoor, Devon, England. It is a tributary of the River Tavy.

== Bibliography ==
- The Painted Stream, Robin Armstrong, Dent, 1985, ISBN 0-460-04702-7

== See also ==
- Walla Brook
- Rivers of the United Kingdom
