= USS Galatea (1863) =

Gunboat of the United States Navy

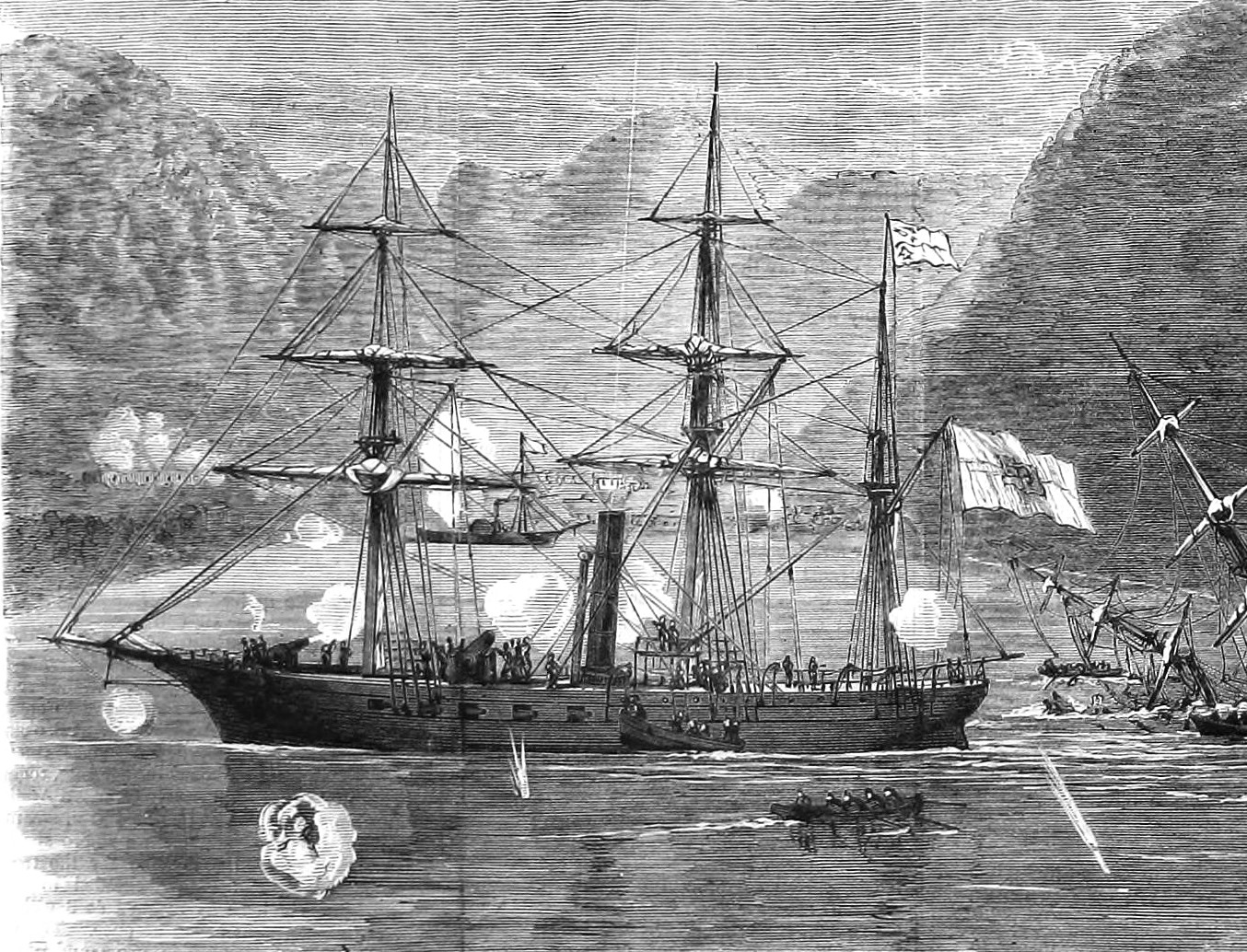
- Alexandre Pétion, formerly USS Galatea, bombarding Petit Goave in 1868

History

United States
- Name: USS Galatea
- Laid down: date unknown
- Launched: About late March 1863
- Acquired: 31 July 1863
- Commissioned: 29 January 1864
- Decommissioned: 12 July 1865
- Stricken: 1865 (est.)
- Home port: Cap-Haïtien, Haiti
- Fate: Sold, 15 August 1865

History

Haiti
- Name: Alexandre Pétion
- Namesake: Alexandre Pétion
- Owner: Haitian Navy
- Acquired: 15 August 1865

General characteristics
- Displacement: 1,244 tons
- Length: 209 ft 6 in (63.86 m)
- Beam: 35 ft 6 in (10.82 m)
- Draught: depth of hold 20 ft 8 in (6.30 m)
- Propulsion: steam engine; screw-propelled
- Speed: 10 knots
- Complement: not known
- Armament: eight 32-pounder guns; one 100-poudner gun; two 30-pounder guns

USS Galatea was a large steamer acquired by the Union Navy during the American Civil War.

She was used by the Union Navy as an escort gunboat in support of the Union Navy, mostly in various parts of the Caribbean, such as in Haiti, where her role was to protect American citizens. She was sold to the Haitian government in 1865 after becoming unseaworthy because of leaks.

== Constructed in New York City, commissioned in 1864 ==
Galatea was built at New York City in 1863 by J. B. and J. D. Van Dusen, Master Builders; she was launched in about late March 1863. Galatea was purchased by the Navy 31 July 1863 from the Neptune Steamship Co.; and commissioned 29 January 1864, Comdr. John Guest in command.

== Supporting Union Navy control of the Caribbean ==
Galatea departed New York 21 February 1864 for service as a unit of the West India Squadron. Based at Cap-Haïtien in Haiti, where she arrived 29 February, she provided convoy protection in the West Indies to California mail steamers plying between New York City and Aspinwall, United States of Colombia.

She had twice returned to New York City for repairs by 10 November 1864 when she was assigned with two other ships to convoy California mail streamers from Cap-Haïtien through the Windward Passage, between the islands of Nacassa and Mariguana.

=== Developing seawater leaks in her structure ===
During this cruise leaks developed which made Galatea unfit for arduous convoy duty. Remaining on station at Cape Haitien, she cruised to Key West, Florida, for provisions and dispatches and afforded protection to American citizens in Haiti until convoy service was discontinued in June 1865.

== End-of-war decommissioning and sale to Haiti ==
Galatea arrived New York City from Cap-Haïtien 1 July 1865; decommissioned 12 July; and was sold to the Haitian government 15 August.

Renamed Alexandre Pétion, on 20 September 1868, she attacked the rebel ships Liberté and Sylvain at Petit-Goâve. Liberté was sunk; Sylvain was set afire and abandoned by her crew. On 20 May 1869, she ran aground off Cape Dame Maria. Her guns were taken out and she was refloated.
