= Morwellham Quay =

Historic river port in Devon, England

Coordinates: 50°30′19″N 04°11′37″W

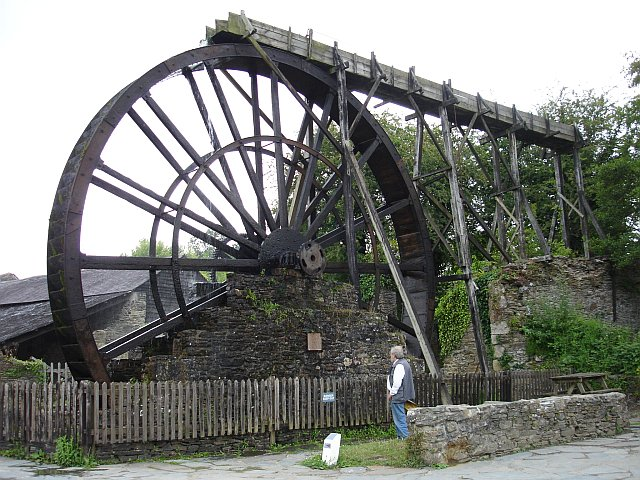
The 32 ft (9.8 m) overshot water wheel, which once powered a mill for crushing locally mined manganese.

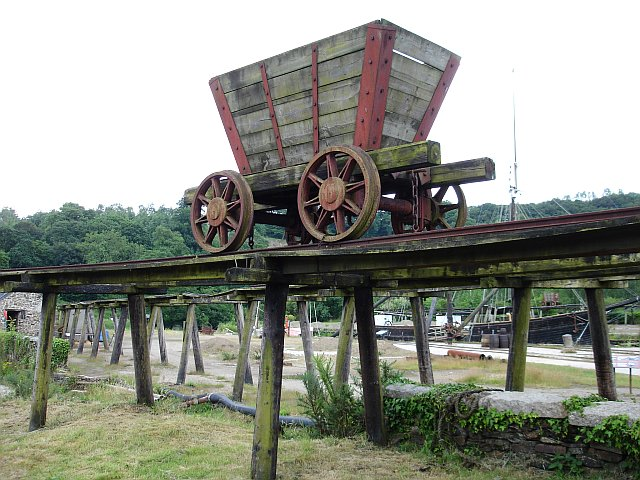
Elevated railway at Morwellham Quay.

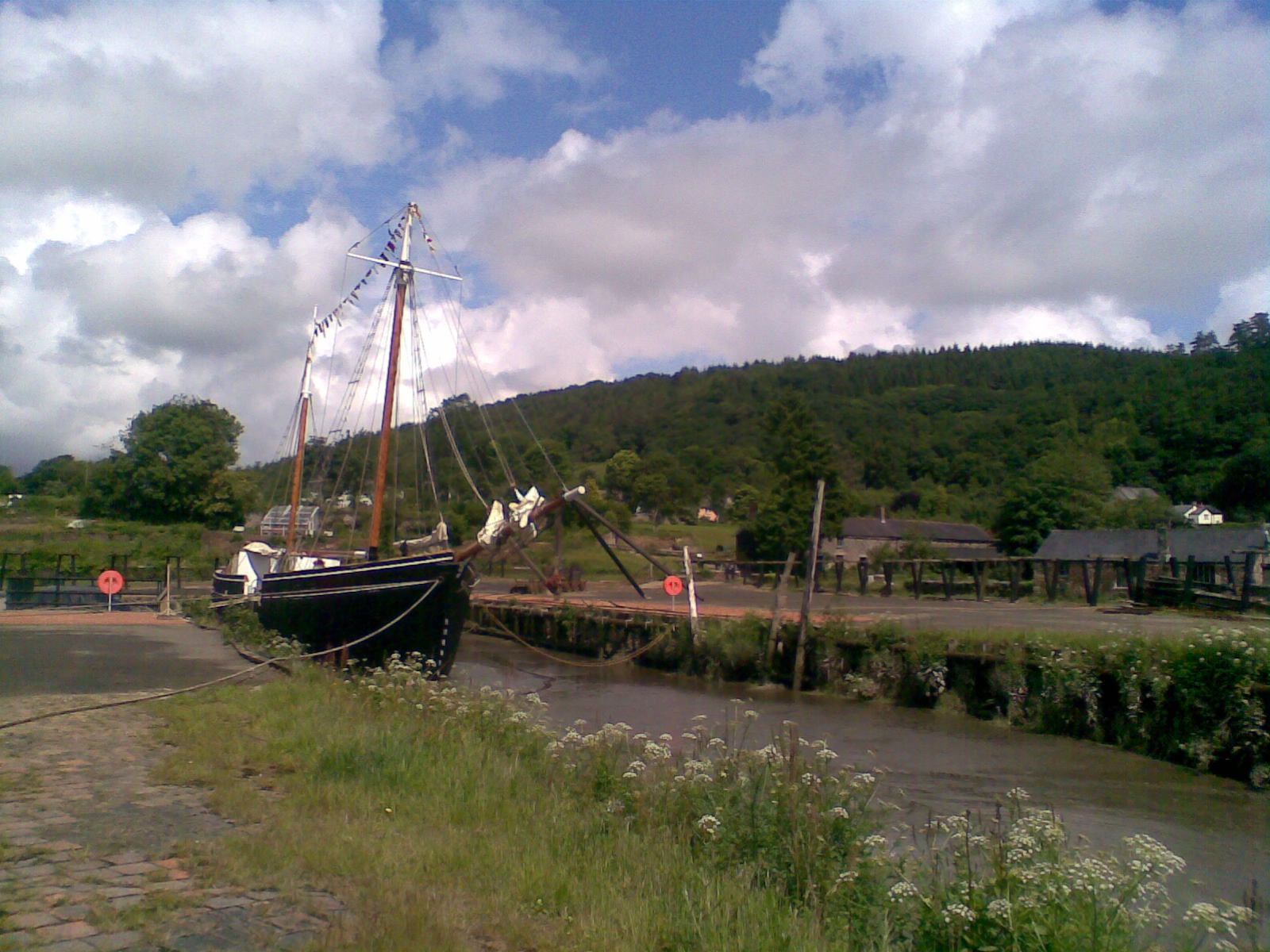
The Great Dock and the restored Tamar sailing ship Garlandstone.

Morwellham Quay is an historic river port in Devon, England that developed to support the local mines. The port had its peak in the Victorian era and is now run as a tourist attraction and museum. It is the terminus of the Tavistock Canal, and has its own copper mine.

The open-air museum includes the restored 19th-century village, the docks and quays, a restored ship, the George and Charlotte copper mine which is toured by a small train, a Victorian farm and a nature reserve with trails.

In July 2006, UNESCO (the cultural arm of the United Nations) awarded World Heritage Site status to the Cornwall and West Devon Mining Landscape area. Morwellham is strategically sited at the centre of the Tamar Valley Mining District which, together with nearby Tavistock, forms the easternmost gateway area to the rest of the World Heritage Site.

The industrial Heritage museum is an Anchor Point of ERIH, The European Route of Industrial Heritage.

== History ==
Morwellham Quay was originally set up by the Benedictine monks of Tavistock Abbey, which was founded in 961, to carry goods to and from Plymouth on the River Tamar, since the River Tavy was unnavigable. By the 12th century, tin ore was being transported through the quay, followed by lead and silver ores in the 13th century. Later, copper deposits were also discovered at the Quay itself and the George and Charlotte Mine opened in the 18th century. In addition, by 1800, manganese deposits were being extracted from the northern and western edges of Dartmoor and being brought to Morwellham.

By the end of the 18th century, the trail of pack horses across the rugged terrain was too much, and in 1817 the 4.5-mile-long Tavistock Canal was opened. The canal included a 1.5-mile tunnel which ended 237 feet above the quay at Morwellham. From here an inclined plane was constructed to bring the iron barges down to the quay, powered by a water wheel.

Morwellham Quay was at its peak during the time Devon Great Consols was in production. The mine was only four miles north of the port and shipped copper and later arsenic via the quay for a period of almost 60 years beginning in 1844. Morwellham became known as the "richest Copper port in Queen Victoria's Empire", and the queen herself visited in 1856. Another inclined plane was built to transport the ore down the hill and a new quay was added to handle the 30,000 tons of ore that were exported each year. Arsenic was also extracted and it became the world's largest supplier of the mineral in the latter part of the century. However, by 1903 the Consols' wealth was exhausted and the mines closed.

By this stage, the railways had taken over and Morwellham's usefulness was also ended. The canal tunnel was used as a water supply for a hydroelectric plant and the inclined planes were abandoned.

In 2009 Devon County Council withdrew funding for the mining museum, which as a direct result was placed into administration. In April 2010 the site was purchased by the owners of Bicton Park, and it reopened to the public later in the year.

== Industrial heritage ==
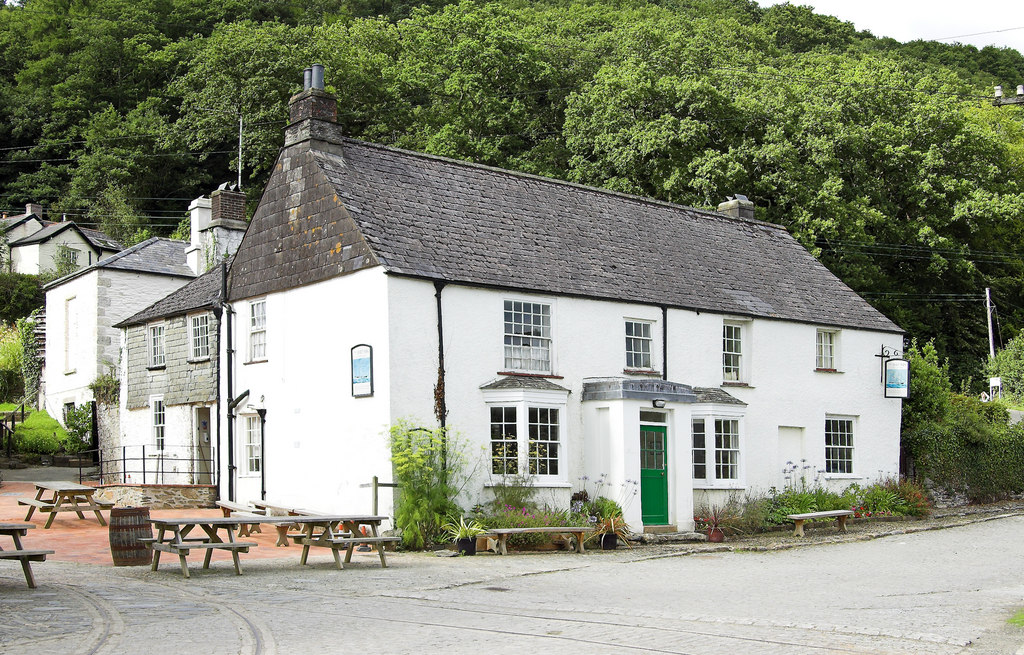
The Ship Inn

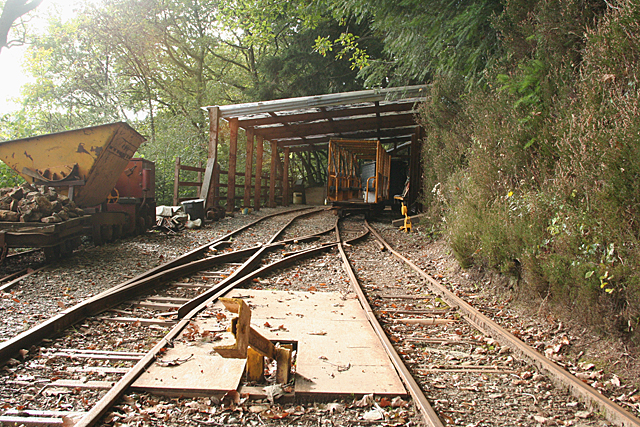
Mine railway

The site has been preserved to give an impression of Victorian industrial and rural life. The assayers' offices have been carefully preserved and Victorian cottages, farm and schoolrooms presented. The ore-crushing plants driven by a 32-foot overhead waterwheel can be seen. A battery electric-powered tramway, constructed as part of the tourist attraction in the 1970s, takes visitors for tours on a single level of the copper mine. There is also an ecological programme of visits to explore the valley by water and land. Old lime kilns can also be seen.

The three areas by the tunnel are listed as the bulk of sources of copper in the county in Lysons' guide to each county of Britain in the 1820s and the county's derived wealth from this metal alone were as follows:

Extract from Magna Britannia: Volume 6, Devonshire
Year	Tons of copper ore	Tons of fine copper smelted	£
1801	1078	136	12,878 (equivalent to £830,000 in 2025)
1811	3540	323	31,517 (equivalent to £2,200,000 in 2025)
1812	5321	506	40,340
1813	5020	475	39,079
1814	5743	473	45,772
1815	4691	371	30,581
1816	3650	319	21,270
1817	3390	287	21,093
1818	4053	407	40,498
1819	3776	374	36,418
1820	4037	463	39,593 (equivalent to £3,310,000 in 2025)

== Edwardian Farm ==
The BBC television series Edwardian Farm was filmed at Morwellham Quay during 2009/2010.

== See also ==
- New Quay (Devon) – A similar port slightly downstream, now abandoned.
- Calstock
- Harewood House, Calstock
