= SS Hippocampus =

Great Lakes ship wrecked on Lake Michigan

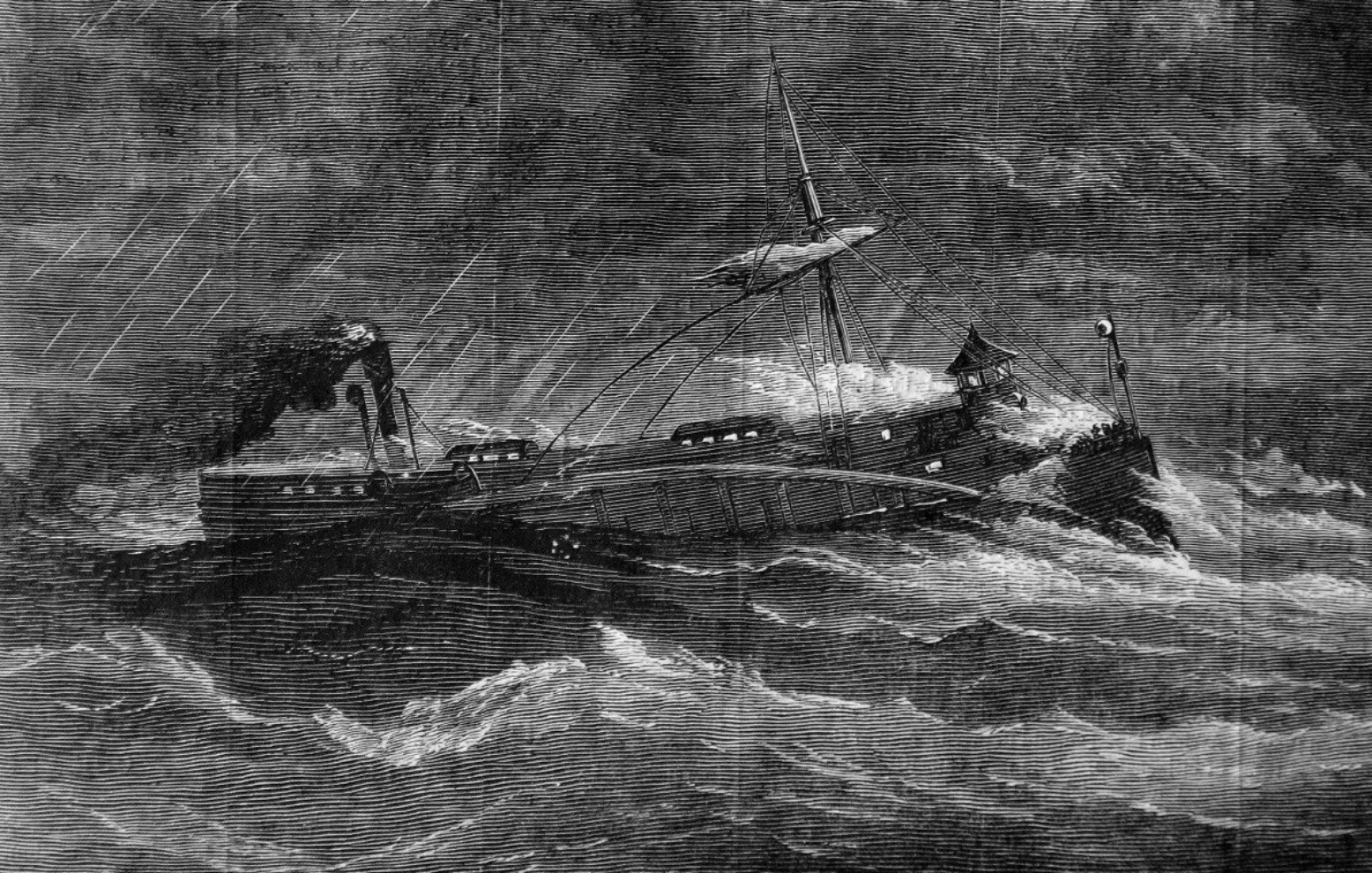
- Woodcut of Hippocampus published in Harper's Weekly

History

United States
- Name: Hippocampus
- Namesake: Hippocampus
- Owner: Curtiss Boughton, John Shaw, and John Morrison
- Port of registry: St. Joseph, Michigan
- Builder: George Hanson, St. Joseph, Michigan
- Cost: $23,000 ($450,240 in 2024) (Note: Johnston, Louis & Williamson, Samuel H. (2023). "What Was the U.S. GDP Then?". MeasuringWorth. United States Gross Domestic Product deflator figures follow the MeasuringWorth series.)
- Launched: 16 July 1867
- Out of service: 8 September 1868
- Identification: US official number 11819
- Fate: Sank in a storm on Lake Michigan

General characteristics
- Type: Passenger and package freighter
- Tonnage: 153 GRT
- Tons burthen: 90
- Length: 90 feet (27.4 m) o/a; 82 feet (25.0 m) p/p
- Beam: 17 feet (5.2 m)
- Depth: 8 feet (2.4 m)
- Installed power: 1 × 150 hp (110 kW) marine steam engine
- Propulsion: 1 × propeller

SS Hippocampus was a small wooden passenger and package freighter built for the fruit trade on Lake Michigan in 1867. In 1868, she began operating on the route between St. Joseph, Michigan, and Chicago, Illinois. She left Benton Harbor, Michigan, on the night of 7 September 1868, with her decks piled high with several thousand boxes of peaches and 55 passengers and crew aboard. After being towed to St. Joseph, she departed for Chicago. Early the following morning, a squall swept Lake Michigan, sinking Hippocampus and killing all but 15 people. Contemporary newspapers speculated overloading to be a contributing factor to her loss.

An object believed to be the wreck of Hippocampus was discovered in 1877. While plans were set in motion to raise it, they failed to materialize, and the location was lost. As of 2026, her wreck has not been located.

== History ==
Hippocampus (US official number 11819) was a diminutive wooden passenger and package freighter built by shipwright George Hanson in St. Joseph, Michigan, in 1867. Her hull had an overall length of 90 feet 1 inch (27.5 m) and a length between perpendiculars of 82 feet (25.0 m). The hull was 17 feet (5.2 m) in beam and 8 feet (2.4 m) deep. (Note: One source lists the dimensions of Hippocampus' hull as 100 feet (30.5 m) in length, 20 feet (6.1 m) in beam, and 7 feet (2.1 m) in depth, while another listed her overall length as 94 feet (28.7 m).) Her tonnage was calculated as 153 gross register tons. Additionally, she was rated 90 tons burthen. Her propulsion system consisted of a 150 hp (110 kW) steam engine with a piston stroke of 22 inches (0.6 m), manufactured by the Vulcan Iron Works of Chicago, Illinois. The Chicago Tribune reported her cargo capacity as 80,000 feet (24,384.0 m) of lumber.

Built for Captains Curtiss Boughton, John Shaw, and John Morrison of St. Joseph, (Note: Also reported as Bouton, Shaw, and Morrison.) at a cost of $23,000 (equivalent to $450,240 in 2024), Hippocampus was named after the Greek phrase for seahorse. After her launch on 16 July 1868, she was towed to Chicago by the steamer Lady Franklin, arriving on 18 July. On reaching Chicago, Hippocampus was surveyed by officials from the local custom house. She was enrolled at Grand Haven, Michigan, on 16 September 1867, and her home port was St. Joseph.

In 1867, Hippocampus began hauling fruit from St. Joseph and Benton Harbor, Michigan, for Milwaukee, Wisconsin. On 10 October that year, Hippocampus reportedly became the first steam-powered vessel to enter the harbour of Manitowoc, Wisconsin, from which tri-weekly voyages to Milwaukee were subsequently advertised by The Manitowoc Pilot. (Note: The Manitowoc Pilot reported Hippocampus's arrival as the inaugural entry of that port by a steamship.)

By 1868, Hippocampus began travelling on the route between St. Joseph and Chicago.

== Final voyage ==
On 7 September 1868, Hippocampus loaded several thousand boxes containing peaches in Benton Harbor. While her cargo was initially scheduled to be smaller, an additional surplus of about 1,000 boxes of peaches stocked in a warehouse belonging to her owners were also loaded. After failing to secure prompt transport of the excess goods aboard another vessel, the owners, concerned about the peaches spoiling, elected to stow them aboard Hippocampus instead. Newspapers initially reported 8,000 boxes of peaches aboard, though this was later denied by Hippocampus' captain, Henry W. Brown, (Note: Also reported as H. M. Brown by the Detroit Free Press.) who later claimed only 7,001 crates. Brown had taken command about a week prior after the previous captain, John Morrison, had fallen ill.

She departed Benton Harbor for Chicago around 22:30 on 7 September with crates of peaches, valued at roughly $10,000 ($195,757 in 2024), and other miscellaneous cargo, reported as "sundries" by the Chicago Tribune, piled high on her main and hurricane decks. The people aboard consisted of roughly 30 crewmen, most of them African American, and 35 passengers. The tug Daisy Lee towed Hippocampus for roughly 1.5 miles (2.4 km) from Benton Harbor to St. Joseph. The tug's crew observed Hippocampus sitting low in the water and rolling erratically, her hatchways frequently becoming submerged. The crew of the schooner Humboldt, which followed Hippocampus to St. Joseph, noted the extent of the cargo aboard. Upon reaching St. Joseph, she ran aground. She was freed after two hours and a considerable effort, continuing under her own power. She left St. Joseph at 23:00 and was due to arrive in Chicago at 03:00 the following day.

At roughly 01:00, a heavy squall descended on Lake Michigan, damaging several vessels. Around this time, Hippocampus was last seen afloat by the crew of the schooner Petrel about 20 miles (32.2 km) southwest of St. Joseph. In his testimonial following the wreck, Brown reported she began to roll badly around 01:00. She continued to roll with increasing severity until about 02:30, when Brown ordered the passengers and crew to jettison some of the cargo. Water began flooding through her aft gangway and into her hold via the engine room, causing her to settle lower. Shortly thereafter, Hippocampus rolled over to port, sinking in less than two minutes.

On 9 September, the steamer Comet arrived in Chicago, having reportedly passed through some wreckage from Hippocampus. At 15:45, the tug George W. Wood left St. Joseph to search for her. The tug recovered wreckage from Hippocampus, including pieces of her cabin, furnishings, her flagstaff, ship's papers, and various personal effects of the people aboard. That same day, the steamer George Dunbar discovered peach crates and pieces of Hippocampus's upper works floating 33 miles (53.1 km) from Chicago.

Initially, newspapers reported no survivors from Hippocampus. However, fifteen survivors were rescued by the crew of the schooner Trio, which provided them passage to Saugatuck, Michigan. The survivors included six crewmen, among them Brown.

== Aftermath and wreck ==
Contemporary newspapers blamed the loss of Hippocampus on overloading. On 18 September 1868, the Chicago Tribune reported her loss to be a result of "wanton carelessness or avarice" on behalf of her owners, surmising that the large quantity of peaches stacked on her decks rendered her top-heavy and unstable in poor weather.

Hippocampus was valued at $22,000 ($430,665 in 2024) and insured for $12,600 ($246,653 in 2024), divided between four firms based in New York City, Detroit, Michigan, and Hartford, Connecticut. While three of the four firms compensated her owners, the Aetna Insurance Company of Hartford refused to surrender their portion ($3,000 ($58,727 in 2024)) of the damages, contesting it on the grounds of negligence in the overloading of Hippocampus. Boughton, owner of two-thirds of the interest in Hippocampus, filed a lawsuit against Aetna with the United States District Court in Grand Rapids, Michigan, in 1869, seeking $7,000 ($205,224 in 2024) in 1884. The court ruled in favour of Boughton on 15 November 1884, ordering Aetna to pay $4,123.22 ($120,884 in 2024).

In late April 1877, the clerk of the steamer Messenger reported that a fishing smack had snagged their nets on a submerged object in about 100 feet (30.5 m) of water, roughly 20 miles (32.2 km) from St. Joseph. A contemporary article by The Inter Ocean reported the confirmation of the object as the wreck of Hippocampus based on the discovery of peach boxes and other items known to have been on board, entangled in the nets of the fishermen who initially discovered it. Plans involving a Chicago-based salvage firm were made to raise the wreck, though they never materialized, and its location was eventually lost.

The wreck of Hippocampus has not been located. In 2018, the Associated Press listed her as "one of the most-sought-after undiscovered Great Lakes shipwrecks". Additionally, Canadian maritime historian Cris Kohl listed her as among the "100 most hunted" wrecks on the Great Lakes in 2005.

== Sources ==
- "Another Terrible Disaster on Lake Michigan". Detroit Free Press. 10 September 1868. p. 1 – via Newspapers.com.
- Baillod, Brendon (2021). "The Tragic Loss of the Hippocampus". Shipwreck World. Madison, Wisconsin.
- "Hippocampus (1867, Propeller)". Alpena, Michigan: Alpena County George N. Fletcher Public Library.
- "Hippocampus (Propeller), U11819, aground, 7 Sep 1868". US Merchant Vessel List – via Maritime History of the Great Lakes.
- "Items". St. Joseph Saturday Herald. St. Joseph, Michigan. 26 May 1877. p. 3 – via Newspapers.com.
- Kohl, Cris (2005). The Great Lakes Diving Guide (2nd ed.). West Chicago: Seawolf Communications. ISBN 978-0-9679-9769-8 – via Internet Archive.
- "New Propeller Hull". Chicago Tribune. 19 July 1867. p. 3 – via Newspapers.com.
- "Our Neighbors". The Niles Democrat. Niles, Michigan. 22 November 1884. p. 1 – via Newspapers.com.
- "Steamboat Disaster". Chicago Tribune. 10 September 1868. p. 4 – via Newspapers.com.
- "The Hippocampus". Buchanan Record. Buchanan, Michigan. 20 November 1884. p. 3 – via Newspapers.com.
- "The Hippocampus". Chicago Tribune. 11 September 1868. p. 4 – via Newspapers.com.
- "The Hippocampus". The Inter Ocean. Chicago. 24 April 1877. p. 6 – via Newspapers.com.
- "The Hippocampus – Her Wreck is Discovered, and No Mistake". The Inter Ocean. Chicago. 30 April 1877. p. 6 – via Newspapers.com.
- "The Hippocampus – Statements of the Survivors". Chicago Tribune. 14 September 1868. p. 4 – via Newspapers.com.
- "The Hippocampus Disaster". Detroit Free Press. 16 September 1868. p. 4 – via Newspapers.com.
- "The Propeller Hippocampus". The Manitowoc Pilot. Manitowoc, Wisconsin. 11 October 1867. p. 1 – via Newspapers.com.
- "The Search Continues: a Few of the Most-Sought-After Undiscovered Great Lakes Shipwrecks". Minnesota Public Radio. Saint Paul, Minnesota. 8 July 2018.
