= Devon Great Consols =

Former copper mine in Devon, England

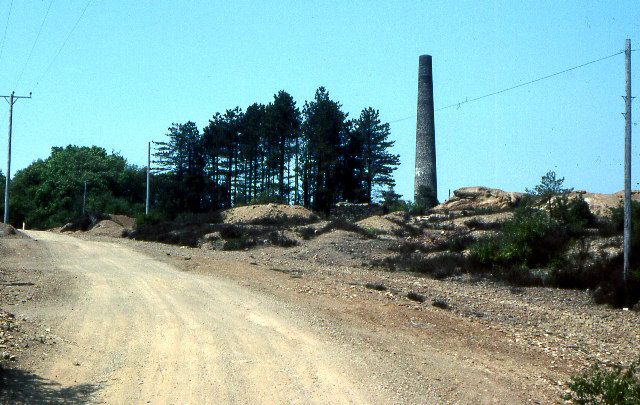
- Disused mineworkings in 1978

- Location within England

Location
- Location: Tavistock, Devon, England; 50°32′18″N 4°13′22″W

Production
- Products: Copper; Arsenic

History
- Opened: 1844
- Closed: 1903

Devon Great Consols was a copper mine near Tavistock in Devon, England. The lease on the site was taken from the Duke of Bedford in 1844 by a group of investors, Sanderson & Co., that included the father of William Morris. The 1,024 shares, sold at one pound each, were divided among the six men. Earlier attempts to mine this property had all ended in failure.

Work at the site began in August of the same year, when it was known as North Bedford Mines or Wheal Maria. By November 1844, a rich vein of copper ore was discovered at a depth of 20 fathoms (about 36 metres) under ground. After learning that the copper lode extended eastward for over two miles (over 3 km), the company quickly began opening other mines on its property.

In the first six years of operation, nearly 90,000 tons of copper ore had come from Devon Great Consols. The mine was so productive that transport by horse and wagon could no longer handle the volume of copper it sent to the docks at Morwellham Quay. The company built its own railway, the Devon Great Consols Railway, to get its product to market; it was also necessary for the firm to build a Great Dock and Morwellham Quay because of the amount of copper it had to ship.

It was once viewed as the most productive copper mine in the world. When cheaper sources of copper became available from abroad, the company began refining arsenic in 1867 and was considered to be its largest producer in the 19th century.

== History ==
The counties of Devon and Cornwall were at their height of copper production in the early to mid 19th century. While there were many very productive mines in existence for some time, there was active speculation about the establishment of new ones.In copper mining one could sometimes make large profits from small investments, but for every new mine which proved successful, there were countless others which failed. Previous attempts at mining the property which became Devon Great Consols had ended in failure.

=== World's most productive copper mine ===
Led by Josiah Hugh Hitchens, a group of six investors who were comfortable with the risks in establishing a new copper mine, agreed to fund the project with £1,024. The group met the Duke of Bedford's land agent and signed a lease for the property on 26 July 1844. Among those investing was William Morris Sr.; his son, William Morris, served as the director of the company from 1871 to 1875.

The 21-year lease for the mine called for royalties to be increased at the time the mine made a profit. The mine was first named Wheal Maria (Wheal is Cornish for "a place of work", and is often applied to mines in West Devon and Cornwall), for the Duke of Bedford's wife. Work began at the site in August 1844. By November 1844, a rich copper lode was discovered at the depth of 20 fathoms (about 36 metres) below ground. It was determined that the lode was at least 40 feet (12 metres) wide and extended eastward for more than two miles (more than 3 km). The company rapidly opened other mines in the vicinity: Wheal Anna Maria, Wheal Fanny, Wheal Emma and Wheal Josiah among them.

By 1847, steam engines were in use at the mine, but the cost of their operation became a concern. A plan was devised to cut costs by using water power. In 1849, the company received permission to use the River Tamar to construct leats. Three large leats were built to divert water from the river to the mine; 33 wheels at the mine were powered in this way. The company became the Devonshire Great Consolidated Copper Mining Company, or Devon Great Consols, on 25 March 1845. In the first six years of operation, the investors extracted and sold close to 90,000 tons of copper ore; the Duke received £44,000 in royalties, with the investors earning £207,000. In total 1,024 shares were sold, and shareholders received over £200 for each share of stock held; the value of shares continued to rise. The shares were sold in 1844 for one pound per share. By 1864, the total dividends paid to shareholders was £818,824. The mine was 200 fathoms (360 metres) deep and employed 1,284 people in 1864. Of these 861 were men, 203 were boys; there were 220 female workers. The mine was considered to be the most productive copper mine in the world around 1864.

One of the company's locomotives at Devon Great Consols

Because of the amount of ore the mine produced, transporting it by horse and wagon soon proved inefficient. The company built its own five-mile (8 km) railway; it was completed in November 1858; this linked the mine with Morwellham Quay for the export of ores. It was the only mine to have its own railway. In time, the rail line was extended to the Wheal Josiah and Bedford United mines. Devon Great Consols owned three locomotives and 60 wagons, which transported ore to Morwellham Quay and also brought equipment and supplies such as coal, to the mine. An average run from the mine to Morwellham Quay consisted of 8 to 10 wagons of ore.

The railway was closed when the mine stopped production. Most of the track was removed and sold as scrap after the mine was closed in 1903. Some track was re-laid and some portions of the line were re-opened in the 1920s. Rail connections to Bedford United mine, to Wheal Anna Maria and to the arsenic works were restored, but with narrow gauge track replacing the original standard gauge. The rail line between Devon Great Consols and Wheal Emma was never disturbed. A later connection between Wheal Fanny and the new arsenic works was created around the 1920s. Much of what remains of the railway and its associated structures have scheduled monument status.

Worker at arsenic works

Since the mine was so productive, the company had to build its own facilities at Morwellham Quay to handle the ore. Between 1856 and 1858, it built its own Great Dock and quay at Morwellham. It had an incline for its last half-mile to the quay at Morwellham. Cars were lowered two at a time onto the incline, where the power to move them on came from a steam engine. They passed through a tunnel and onto viaducts built on the quay. After the mine's closure, the track was removed and the tunnel infilled; this was partially restored in 2007. The engine house and associated structures survive, as does the incline. The Devon Great Consols dock was restored in the latter part of the 20th century with the bollards and portions of a crane from the quay surviving. Most of the structures have scheduled monument status.

=== Copper gives way to arsenic ===
By 1884, the quality of the copper ore produced at Devon Great Consols was poor, and it yielded more arsenic than copper. After being sorted by the mine's bal maidens, the copper ore was sent to south Wales to be smelted. The company began exploring the possibility of tin deposits at the mine but found none. (Note: It was suggested that large quantities of tin ore may have been found through deeper exploration. From time to time, small quantities of tin had been discovered in various areas of the mine and were sold. It was also noted that the refined "dredge arsenic" still contained a small amount of copper. Traces of gold, silver and tin were also found in this dredge material. The New Great Consols, across the river from Devon Great Consols, had procedures in place to use these trace findings; Devon Great Consols did not.)

Arsenic works

As cheaper copper imports and the declining quality of its copper ore began to affect the profit of Devon Great Consols, the company found a new source of income to replace its copper mining: arsenic could be extracted from the mine scrap. Previously, arsenic had been imported from Germany. Devon Great Consols expanded into arsenic production beginning in 1867. The company's arsenic facilities extended over eight acres (3 hectares); it was the largest arsenic producer in the world during the 19th century.

The works at Devon Great Consols now made Britain the world's largest arsenic producer; the mine produced more than half of the total output in Britain. The mine's high quality product was in demand by industry both at home and abroad; production was only limited by the need to sustain market prices for arsenic. There were about 700 people still working at the mine in 1893.

The mine fell victim to low prices for arsenic and a need for capital for both improvements and exploration. In July 1902 the shareholders were asked for more money, but this was not paid. No dividends were paid to shareholders after in June 1899. Despite this, the Duke of Bedford renewed the lease on the land, giving the company an opportunity to recover from its losses. The mine was abandoned in 1903, and the equipment was sold off in May that year. During its 60 years in business, Devon Great Consols produced some 700,000 tons of copper ore and 72,000 tons of refined arsenic.

== Post-closure ==
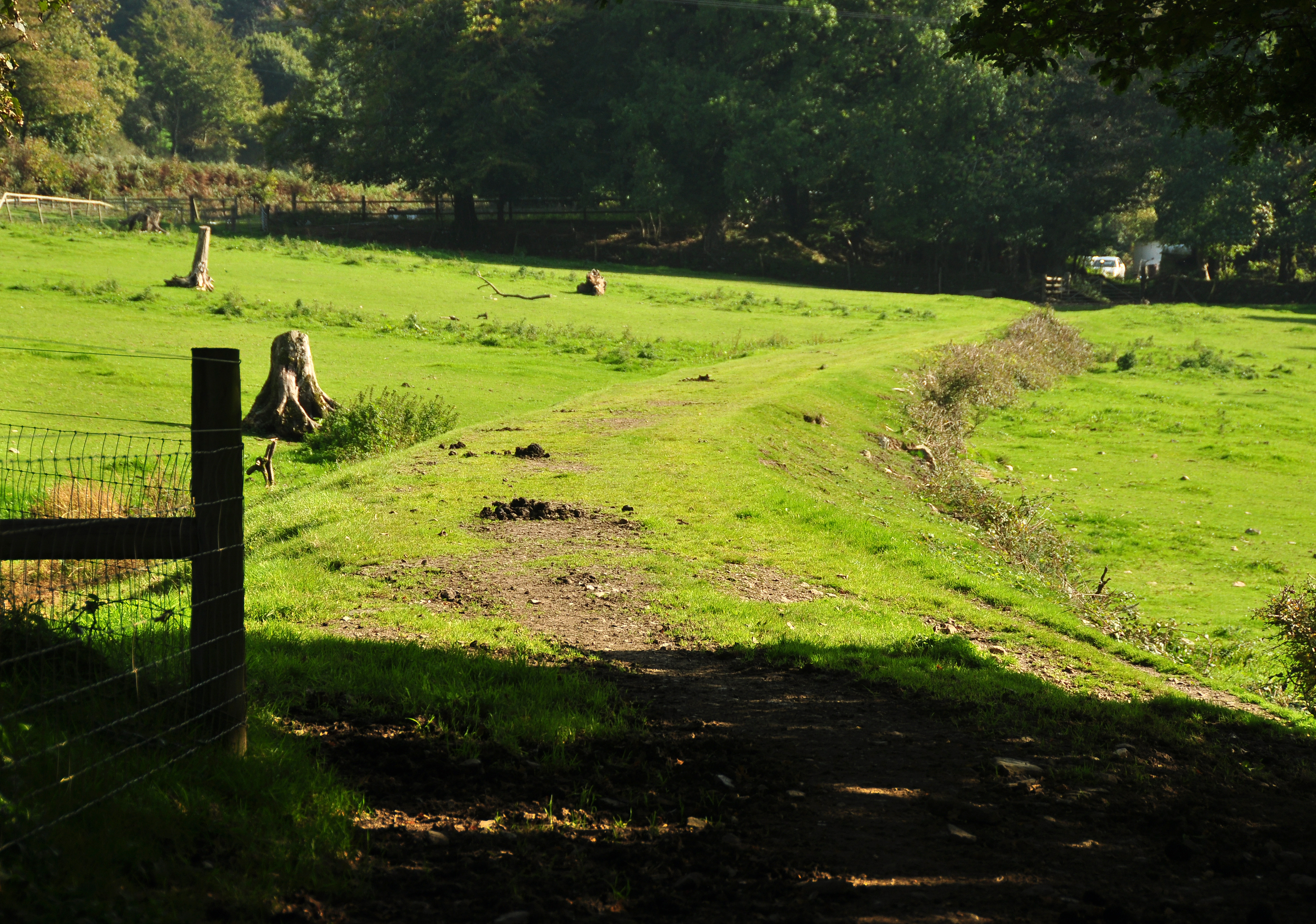
Former trackbed of the Devon Great Consols railway

By 1905, the mine property had reverted to the Duke of Bedford and an attempt to clean up the site had begun. The chimney and arsenic collecting flues were destroyed with dynamite, and men were chipping arsenic soot from the fallen bricks. The site was active again for a period of time during World War I, when arsenic was needed to produce blister gas. (Note: During World War I, ore was once again brought from the mine, but the raw ore was taken to Cornwall for further processing.) During this time, tin and tungsten ore was also mined. The post-war slump brought an end to mining tungsten and tin at Devon Great Consols, but arsenic production continued until 1930. (Note: When it was decided to return to arsenic mining and processing on a small scale prior to 1930, a new processing plant was built.) Some copper precipitation and ochre recovery took place at the mine around 1950, and a small mill was built for the purpose of treating the site's dump ore.

The mine is now part of the Cornwall and West Devon Mining Landscape World Heritage site and has been open to the public since 2009. Three of the mine captain's houses became Grade II Listed Buildings on 13 January 1986. The original arsenic works and cottages at Wheal Josiah became Grade II Listed buildings on 23 January 1987. The 20th century arsenic works became a scheduled monument on 24 July 2002. In 2007, £7 million was received for restoration work on the early 20th century arsenic refinery; the work at the site continued into 2014. The land around the mine is still heavily contaminated. In 2020, a study by the University of Plymouth found that arsenic concentrations across 98 locations at Devon Great Consols were higher than prescribed Category 4 Screening Levels, and suggested whether stricter controls were required to ensure the safety of the general public who access the site.

== Mineral statistics ==
From Robert Hunt's Mineral Statistics of the United Kingdom.

Copper Production
Year(s)	Ore (Tons)	Metal (Tons)	Value (£)
1848	16,374.00	1,684.10	93,418.30
1849	15,777.00	1,508.60	96,934.70
1850	17,089.00	1,632.30	109,990.00
1851	18,921.00	1,708.60	111,082.00
1852	20,802.00	1,659.10	134,224.00
1853	24,120.00	1,583.50	147,281.00
1854	23,174.00	1,486.10	143,224.00
1855	23,467.00	1,385.60	131,294.00
1856	29,425.00	1,687.10	143,045.00
1857	25,746.00	1,472.60	139,770.00
1858	23,102.00	1,352.10	116,772.00
1859	22,832.00	1,243.90	114,034.00
1860	21,920.00	1,224.50	109,327.00
1861	20,801.00	1,178.50	103,073.00
1862	24,615.00	1,448.10	116,942.00
1863	26,756.00	1,672.60	128,799.00
1864	25,956.00	1,613.30	136,190.00
1865	25,259.00	1,593.00	126,932.00
1866	22,671.00	1,453.50	98,144.70
1867	20,067.00	1,333.30	94,510.80
1868	20,955.00	1,391.50	92,590.30
1869	16,379.00	1,010.40	62,014.90
1870	16,332.00	884.10	49,729.70
1871	17,413.00	868.80	50,116.60
1872	15,315.00	717.10	52,942.20
1873	8,716.00	428.50	24,615.30
1874	5,676.00	364.30	22,920.60
1875	7,085.00	416.50	29,668.00
1876	9,420.00	521.70	33,626.10
1877	11,383.60	613.40	34,250.40
1878	9,394.80	425.00	18,307.20
1879	10,261.00	518.80	22,598.70
1880	10,116.20	512.10	24,929.90
1881	10,922.70	442.10	20,113.50
1882	11,970.80	598.50	41,897.00
1883	11,127.20	459.00	20,815.00
1884	10,520.00	..	16,827.00
1885	9,778.00	..	11,988.00
1886	6,077.00	..	6,498.00
1887	4,209.00	..	6,538.00
1888	4,784.00	..	8,501.00
1889	637.00	..	958.00
1890	4,368.00	..	4,310.00
1891	3,142.00	..	3,960.00
1892	2,572.00	..	3,475.00
1893	2,312.00	..	3,716.00
1894	2,211.00	..	2,907.00
1895	2,008.00	132.00	3,807.00
1896	1,530.00	..	2,971.00
1897	1,417.00	93.00	2,773.00
1898	1,084.00	71.00	2,188.00
1899	837.00	..	2,224.00
1900	1,015.00	..	2,737.00
1901	842.00	..	1,948.00
1902	268.00	..	370.00
1907	27.00	..	106.00
1914	39.00	..	1,267.00
1915	45.00	..	2,040.00
1916	55.50	..	2,975.00
1917	39.00	..	2,517.00
1918	41.00	..	2,614.00
Total	701,198.8	40,388.2	3,096,337.9

Arsenic Production
Year(s)	Ore (Tons)	Value (£)
1868	473.50	2,802.60
1869	1,372.60	7,726.70
1870	2,237.10	12,557.90
1871	2,220.20	11,863.00
1872	2,222.30	11,400.90
1873	1,878.60	12,100.50
1874	1,842.00	12,762.00
1875	1,212.00	10,503.10
1876	1,521.60	14,705.40
1877	2,327.90	19,029.50
1878	2,481.80	16,966.00
1879	3,252.50	22,848.30
1880	3,148.80	26,283.50
1881	2,851.50	23,325.00
1882	2,760.10	22,080.00
1883	2,974.20	23,793.00
1884	3,198.30	25,586.00
1885	3,333.10	23,588.00
1886	2,428.20	18,342.00
1887	2,082.00	16,659.00
1888	2,100.00	19,275.00
1889	2,150.00	21,137.00
1890	2,615.00	28,523.00
1891	2,241.00	24,406.00
1892	2,174.00	20,567.00
1893	3,966.00	41,372.00
1894	2,212.00	24,608.00
1895	1,673.00	20,268.00
1896	1,521.00	20,453.00
1897	1,731.00	33,835.00
1898	1,723.00	24,240.00
1899	1,309.00	21,669.00
1900	1,408.00	25,504.00
1901	1,153.00	15,000.70
1902	879.00	10,513.00
1903	212.00	2,403.00
1904	149.00	1,406.00
Total	75,034.3	690,102.1

== Sources ==
- Collins, Joseph Henry (1912). Observations on the West of England Mining Region. Joseph Henry Collins.
- Cullen, William R. (2008). Is Arsenic an Aphrodisiac?: the Sociochemistry of an Element. Royal Society of Chemistry. ISBN 978-0-8540-4363-7.
- Emsley, John (2006). The Elements of Murder: a History of Poison. OUP Oxford. ISBN 978-0-1928-0600-0.
- Harvey, Charles; Press, Jon (1996). Art, Enterprise, and Ethics: the Life and Works of William Morris. Taylor & Francis US. ISBN 978-0-7146-4258-1.
- "Arsenic-Mining". Chemist and Druggist: The Newsweekly for Pharmacy. Benn Brothers. 29 July 1893.
- House of Commons, British Parliament (1905). Papers by Command, Volume 15. H. M. Stationery Office.
- House of Commons, Parliament of the United Kingdom (1903). Sessional Papers. Inventory Control Record 1, Volume 9. H. M. Stationery Office.
- "The Manufacture of Arsenic". The Living Age. Littell and Co. 1893.
- Leifchild, J. R. (2013). Cornwall, Its Mines and Miners. Routledge. ISBN 978-1-1362-3870-3.
- "A Little-Known Devonshire Locomotive". Locomotive, Railway Carriage and Wagon Review. Locomotive Publishing Company: 81–82. 31 January 1903.
- Murray, J. (1893). A Handbook for Travellers in Devon. J. Murray. p. 222. "Devon Great Consols."
- Phillips, John Arthur (1884). A Treatise on Ore Deposits. Macmillan and Company. p. 150. "Devon Great Consols."
- St John Thomas, David (1975). A Regional History of the Railways of Great Britain: The West Country. David & Charles.
- Spargo, Thomas (1864). Statistics and Observations on the Mines of Cornwall and Devon. Darling and Sons.
