= River Burn, Devon =

River in Devon, England

Coordinates: 50.5643°N 4.1242°W

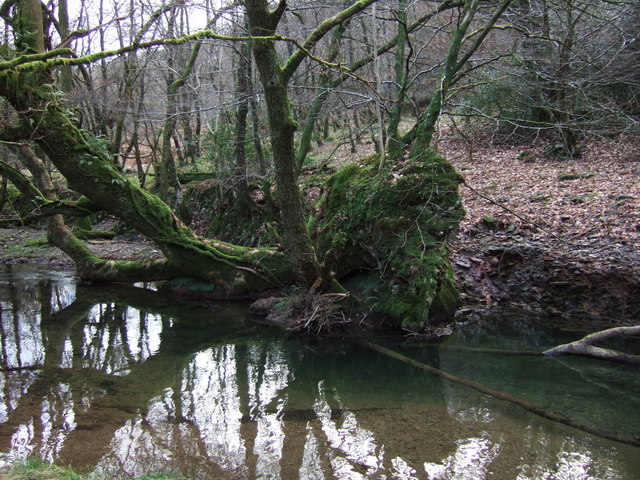
Fallen tree in the River Burn

The Burn is a river on Dartmoor, Devon, England.

It is a tributary of the River Tavy, ultimately a part of the Tamar catchment, and is approximately 8 km (5.0 mi) long.

== See also ==
- List of rivers of England.
