= River Tavy =

River in Devon, England

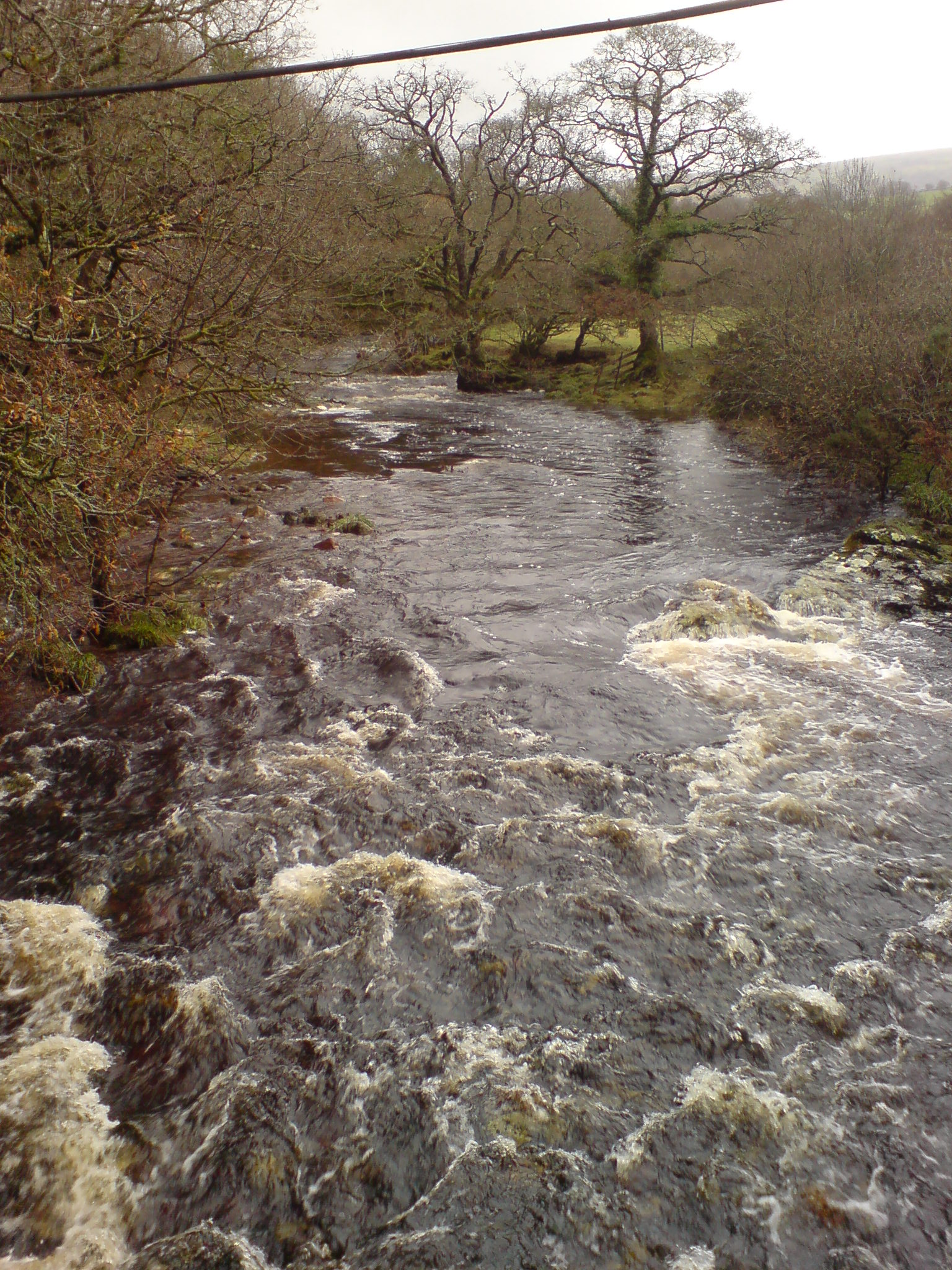
- The Tavy above Tavistock, on the moor

- Location within Devon Location within the United Kingdom

Location
- Country: England
- County: Devon

Physical characteristics
- Mouth: River Tamar
  - location: Bickleigh
  - coordinates: 50°28′N 4°09′W

Basin features
- Tributaries
  - left: Collybrooke; River Walkham
  - right: River Burn; River Wallabrooke; River Lumburn

The Tavy (/ˈteɪvi/) is a river on Dartmoor, Devon, England. The name derives from the Brythonic root tam, once thought to mean 'dark' but now generally understood to mean 'to flow'. It has given its name to the town of Tavistock and the villages of Mary Tavy and Peter Tavy.

It is a tributary of the River Tamar and has as its own tributaries: Collybrooke, River Burn, River Wallabrooke, River Lumburn, and River Walkham. At Tavistock it feeds a canal running to Morwellham Quay.

Its mouth is crossed by the Tavy Bridge which carries the Tamar Valley railway line.

== Navigation ==
The river is navigable inland as far as Lopwell, where a weir marks the normal tidal limit, about a 9-mile (14 km) journey from North Corner Quay at Devonport. River transport was an important feature of the local farming, mining, tourism, and forestry economies.

The Queen's Harbour Master for Plymouth is responsible for managing navigation on the River Tavy up to the normal tidal limit.

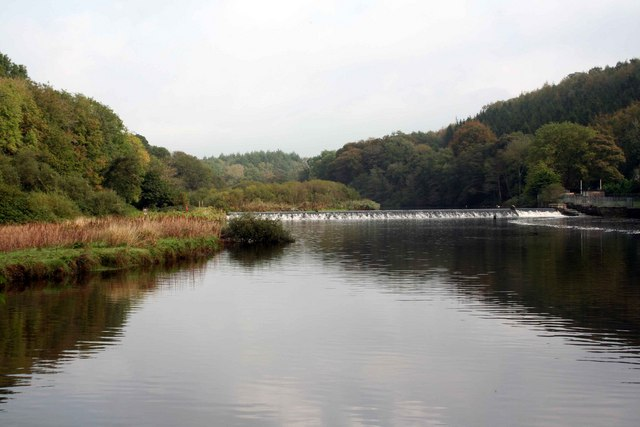
Lopwell weir, highest point of navigation

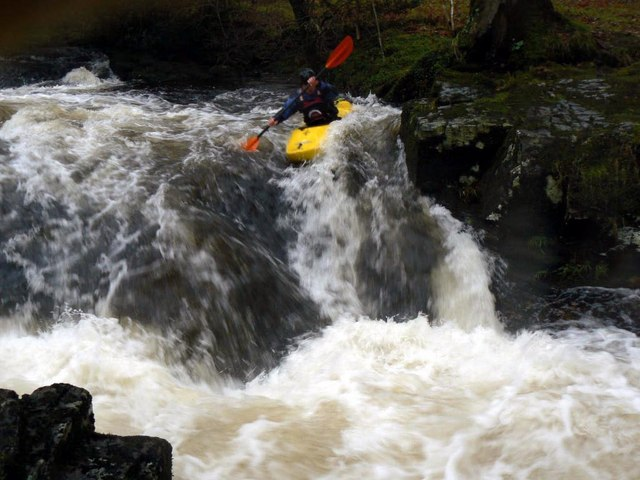
Kayaking on the Tavy.

== See also ==
- Tamar–Tavy Estuary SSSI
