= River Lumburn =

River in Devon, England

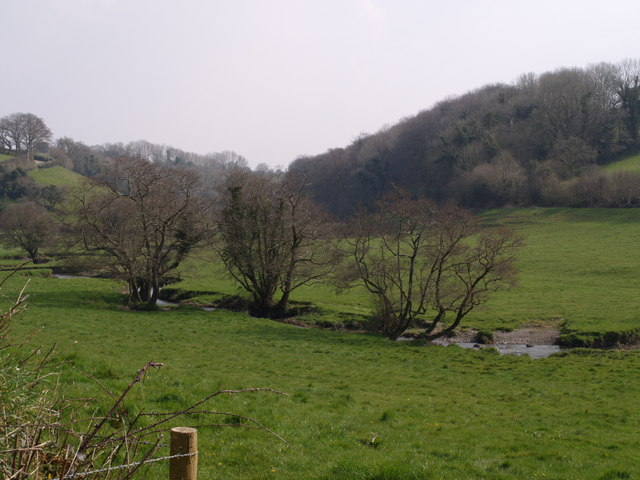
- River Lumburn valley near Tavistock

- Location within Devon Location within the United Kingdom

Location
- Country: England
- County: Devon

Physical characteristics
- Mouth: River Tavy
  - location: Tavistock
  - coordinates: 50.5255°N 4.1650°W

The Lumburn is a river on Dartmoor, Devon, England.

It is a tributary of the River Tavy.

== Bibliography ==
- The Painted Stream, Robin Armstrong, Dent, 1985, ISBN 0-460-04702-7

== See also ==
- Rivers of the United Kingdom
