= Castleside =

Village in County Durham, England

Coordinates: 54.833°N 1.879°W

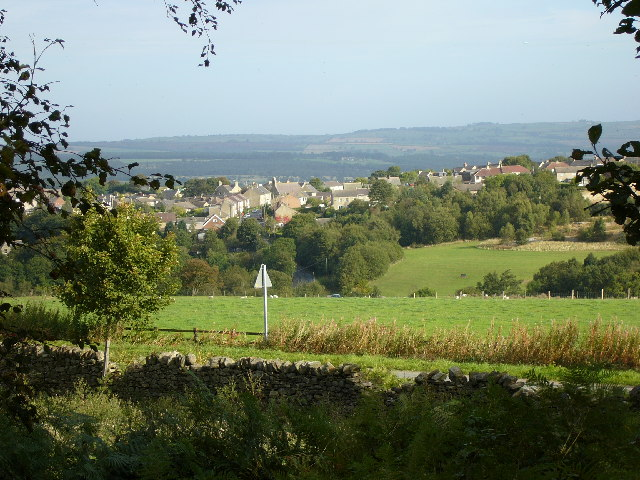
- Looking north-east over Castleside

- Location within County Durham
- Population: 1,654 (2008)
- OS grid reference: NZ078488
- Civil parish: Healeyfield
- Unitary authority: County Durham
- Ceremonial county: County Durham
- Region: North East
- Country: England
- Sovereign state: United Kingdom
- Post town: CONSETT
- Postcode district: DH8
- Dialling code: 01207
- Police: Durham
- Fire: County Durham and Darlington
- Ambulance: North East
- UK Parliament: North Durham

Castleside is a village in County Durham, England. It is situated a short distance to the south-west of Consett. Castleside is covered by the civil parish of Healeyfield.The village centre is located on the main A68 road which runs between Edinburgh and Darlington and the village crossroads allow easy access to Consett via the A692 to the east via Moorside, and the North Pennines and Stanhope via an unclassified road to the west via Waskerley crossing Waskerley Moor. To the northeast lie other small villages called Moorside and The Grove.

Rowley sits to the south on the A68 and Allensford is situated to the north on the same road. Muggleswick is 3 miles to the north west as, a bit further at 5 miles, is Derwent Reservoir and Edmundbyers.

The parish church, dedicated to St John, was designed by Ewan Christian and is a reproduction of a church he had seen and admired while on holiday in Switzerland. The church was consecrated on 7 March 1867.

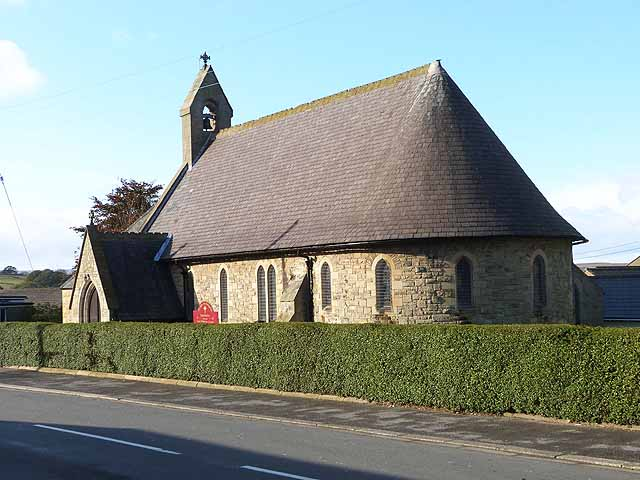
St. John the Evangelist Church, Castleside

There was a Wesleyan Chapel at Watergate, Castleside, which was erected in 1805. The chapel was extended in 1877 and closed in 1970. A Primitive Methodist chapel was erected in 1843 on the Consett Road, and extended in 1884. It closed in the 1990s and is now a residence.

In the nearby dwelling of Wharnley Burn is a 14th-century cottage and was home to the moss trooper Thomas Raw (d. 1714). He was buried in a field near his home believing he could not be buried in a church. In the early 1860s the grave was opened and the grave slab removed, supposedly to Satley. The dwelling shares the name with Wharnley Burn (also called Watergate Burn) that runs along the south west side of Castleside in a steep valley containing Castleside Woods. The burn or stream continues northwest before joining the River Derwent west of Allensford just after Wharnley Burn Waterfall.

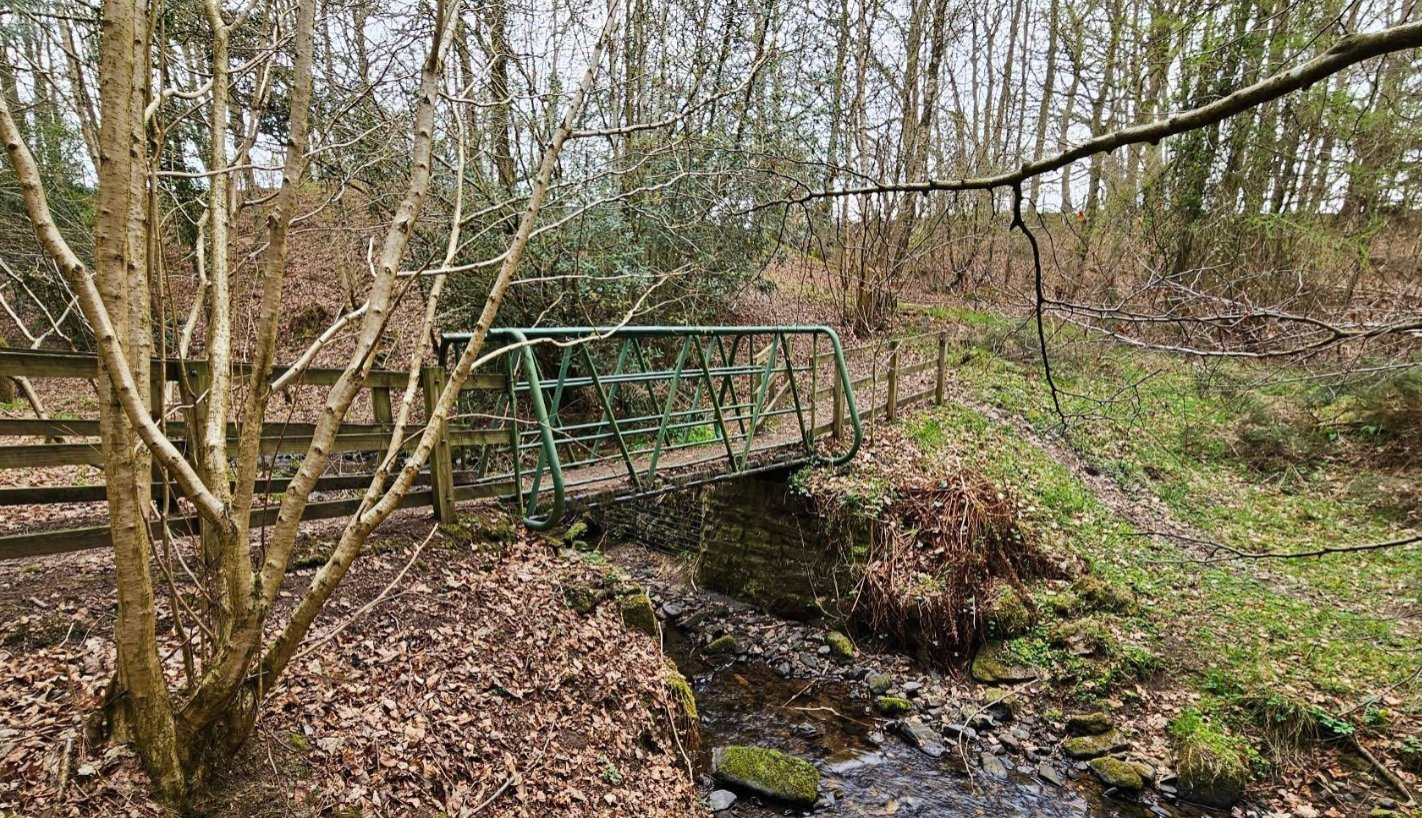
Wharnley or Watergate Burn (David's Bridge – nomenclature unknown), Castleside Woods.

The A692 road to Consett, running north east, leads to the small villages of Moorside and The Grove.

Moorside is a large post-World War II housing estate. It was originally the lands of Consett Park mentioned in 1352 as "half of the manor of Conkesbeved, excepting the park of Conkesheved [now Consett Park]". (Conkesheved being the name for Consett). The manor of Consett and the park of Consett seem to have been two separate entities. The "park of Consett", in 1437, was leased to Henry Vasey. It is unclear who held the lands later, however in the 1850s Consett Park had been owned by the Rippon family for over 200 years, acquired in 1635 by Charles Rippon.

A row of terraced housing was built (1896–1900) on the brow of the hill and called Consett Park Terrace. The housing estate was built after the Second World War with the streets named after English counties. A second phase of building took places in the 1950s including the building of a Roman Catholic church, St Pius X, built in 1954 to designs by the local architect Anthony Joseph Rossi (1916–1971). The church was demolished in 2009 and replaced by a smaller church in the same year. As part of the 1950s building phase, the buildings of Consett Park were demolished. They were located near the intersection of Sussex Road and Surrey Crescent.

A light industrial estate was established in 1950 in the Castleside/Moorside area.
