= Bridgehill =

Area of Consett, County Durham, England

Coordinates: 54°51′42″N 1°51′41″W

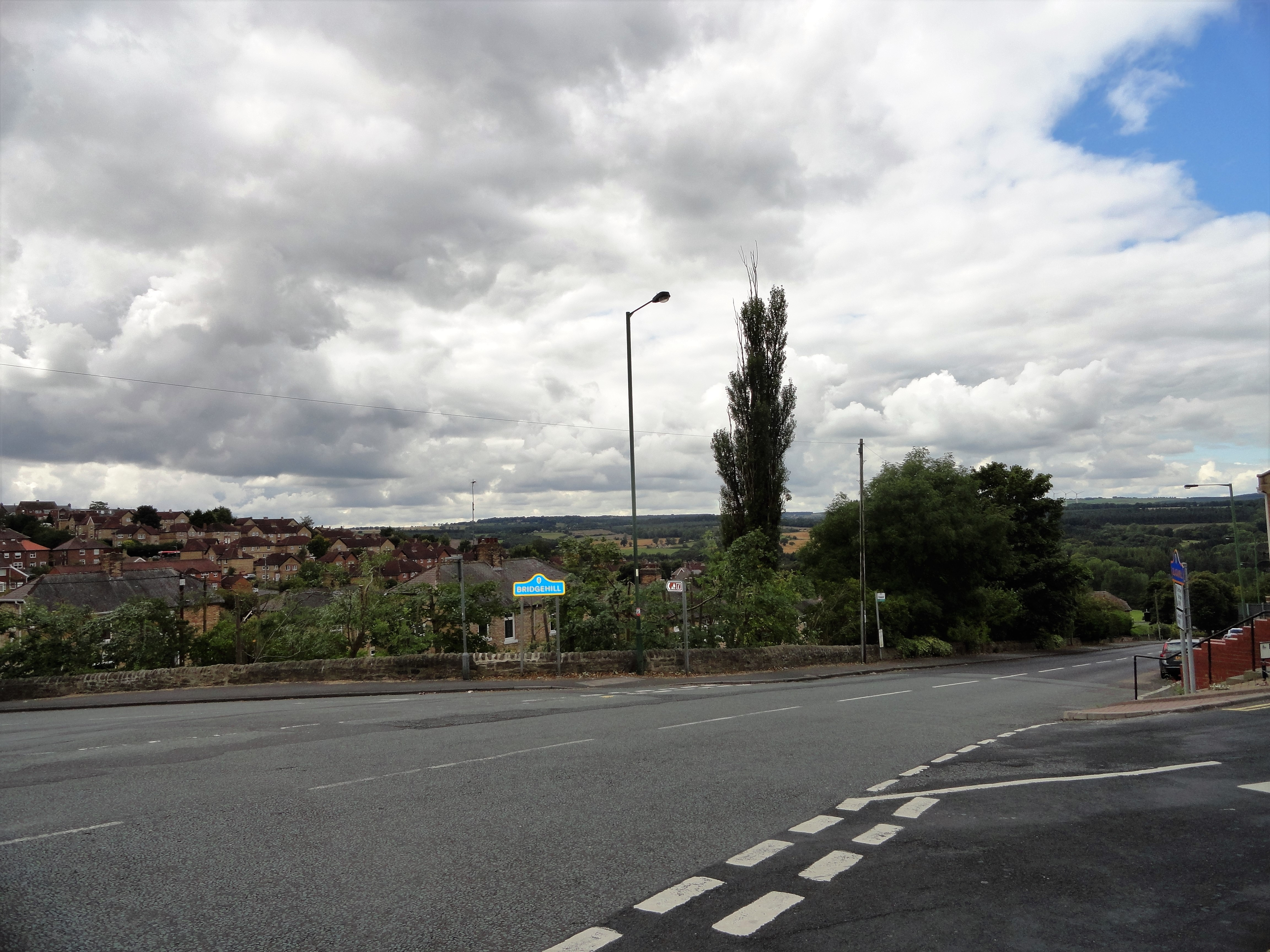
Entering Bridgehill

Bridgehill is an area of Consett in County Durham, England. It is situated near Benfieldside, Blackhill, Shotley Grove, and the River Derwent.
