= Laddie =

Laddie is the word for boy in Scottish English.

Laddie may also refer to:

== Novel and film adaptations ==
- Laddie, a True Blue Story, a 1913 novel by Gene Stratton-Porter, and its adaptations:
  - Laddie (1926 film), an American drama
  - Laddie (1935 film), an American film
  - Laddie (1940 film), an American film

== Fictional characters ==
- "Laddie", the title character in Son of Lassie, a 1945 film
- "Laddie", a dog in The Simpsons episode "The Canine Mutiny"
- "Laddie", a counterpart-of-sorts to Gaspode in Terry Pratchett's Discworld series
- "Laddie", in the novel Cowboys for Christ
- "Laddie", a fictional toy character in the Wee Sing 1988 video: Grandpa's Magical Toys

== People ==
- Laddie Cliff, British dancer, choreographer, actor, producer, writer and director born Clifford Albyn Perry (1891–1937)
- Lauren Laddie Gale (1917–1996), American Hall-of-Fame basketball player
- Laddie Gillett (2007–2021), Belizean police shooting victim
- Laddie Lewis, Guyanese cyclist who competed in the 1948 Olympics
- Laddie Lucas (1915–1998), Second World War Royal Air Force officer, journalist, amateur golfer and Member of Parliament nicknamed "Laddie"
- Ladislaus Laddie Outschoorn (1918–1994), Ceylonese cricketer
- Indra Lal Roy (1898–1918), Indian First World War flying ace nicknamed "Laddie"
- Hugh Laddie (1946–2008), British judge, lawyer and academic
- Mitch Laddie (born 1990), English guitarist, vocalist, songwriter and producer

== Other uses ==
- "Laddie", a nickname for the whiskies from the Bruichladdich distillery
- Laddie Island, Canada, along with Split Island part of the North Belcher Islands
