= MLBP =

MLBP may refer to:

- The record label owned by Mitch Laddie
- Modified local binary patterns
