= Allensford =

Coordinates: 54.846561°N 1.8814900°W

- Location within County Durham
- OS grid reference: NZ 07708 50201
- Unitary authority: County Durham
- Ceremonial county: County Durham
- Region: North East
- Country: England
- Sovereign state: United Kingdom
- Police: Durham
- Fire: County Durham and Darlington
- Ambulance: North East

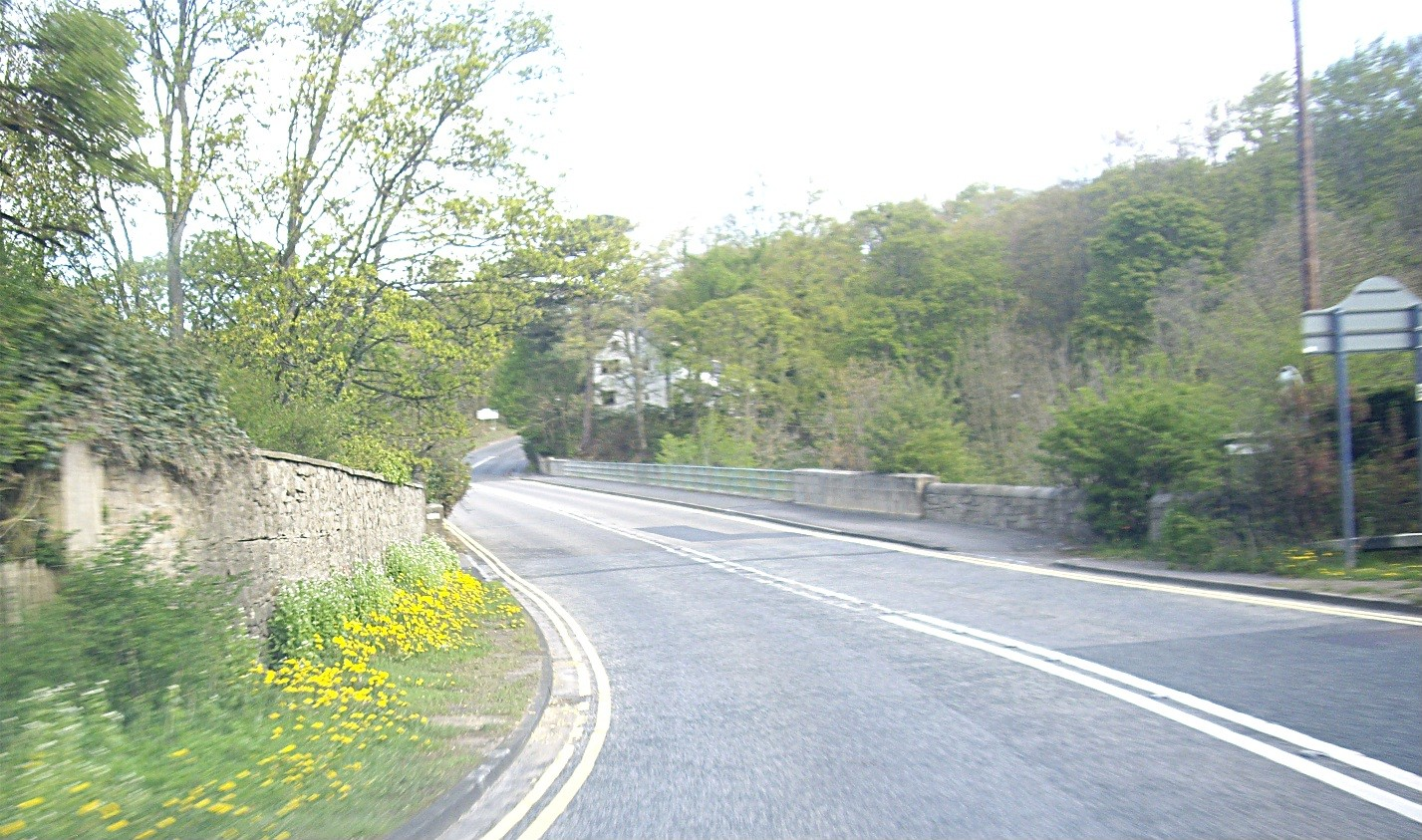
The current Allensford Bridge from the County Durham side, carrying the A68 over the River Derwent.

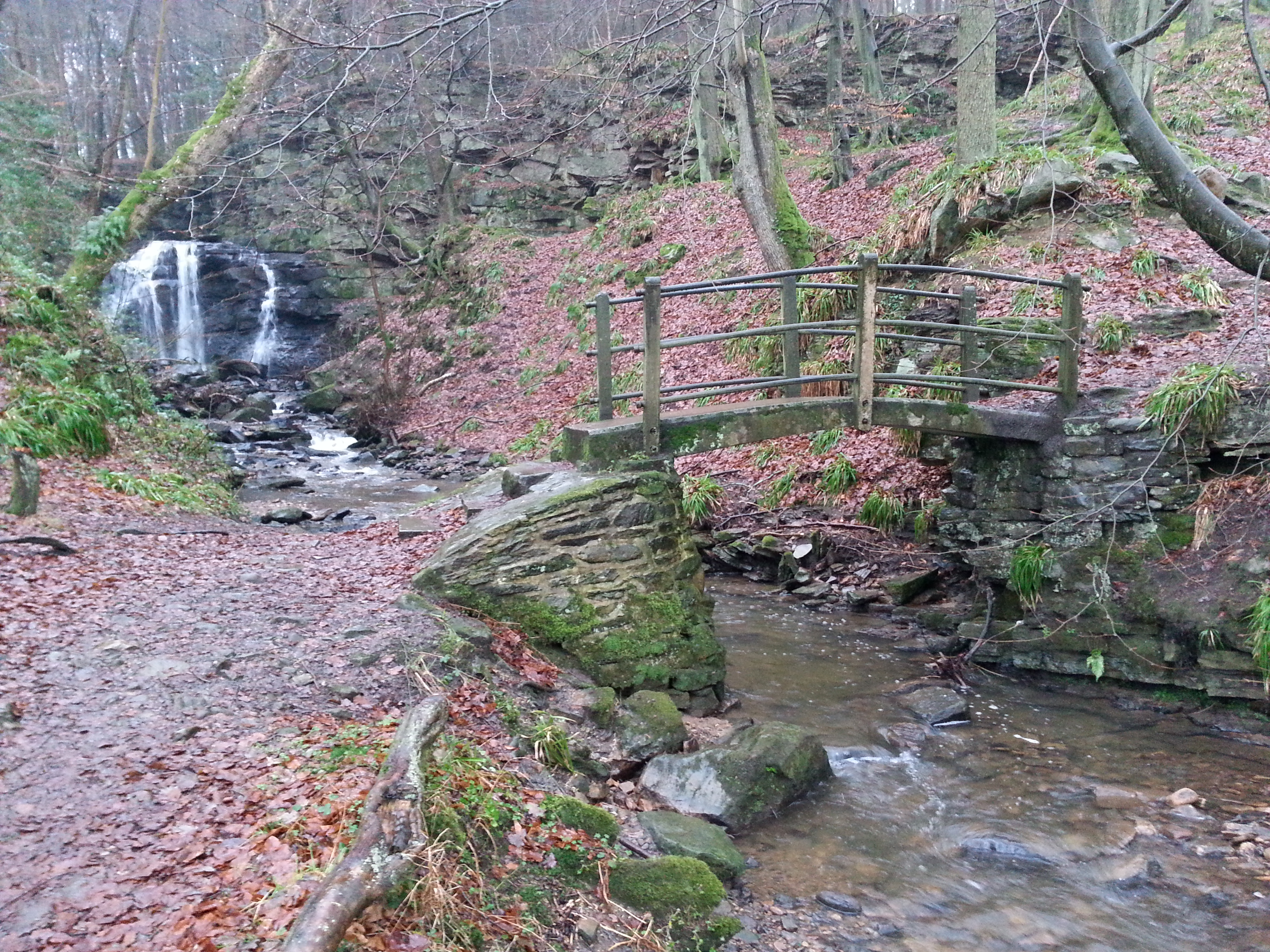
Wharnley Burn Waterfall and footbridge on the Wharnley / Watergate Burn near Allensford just before it meets the River Derwent.

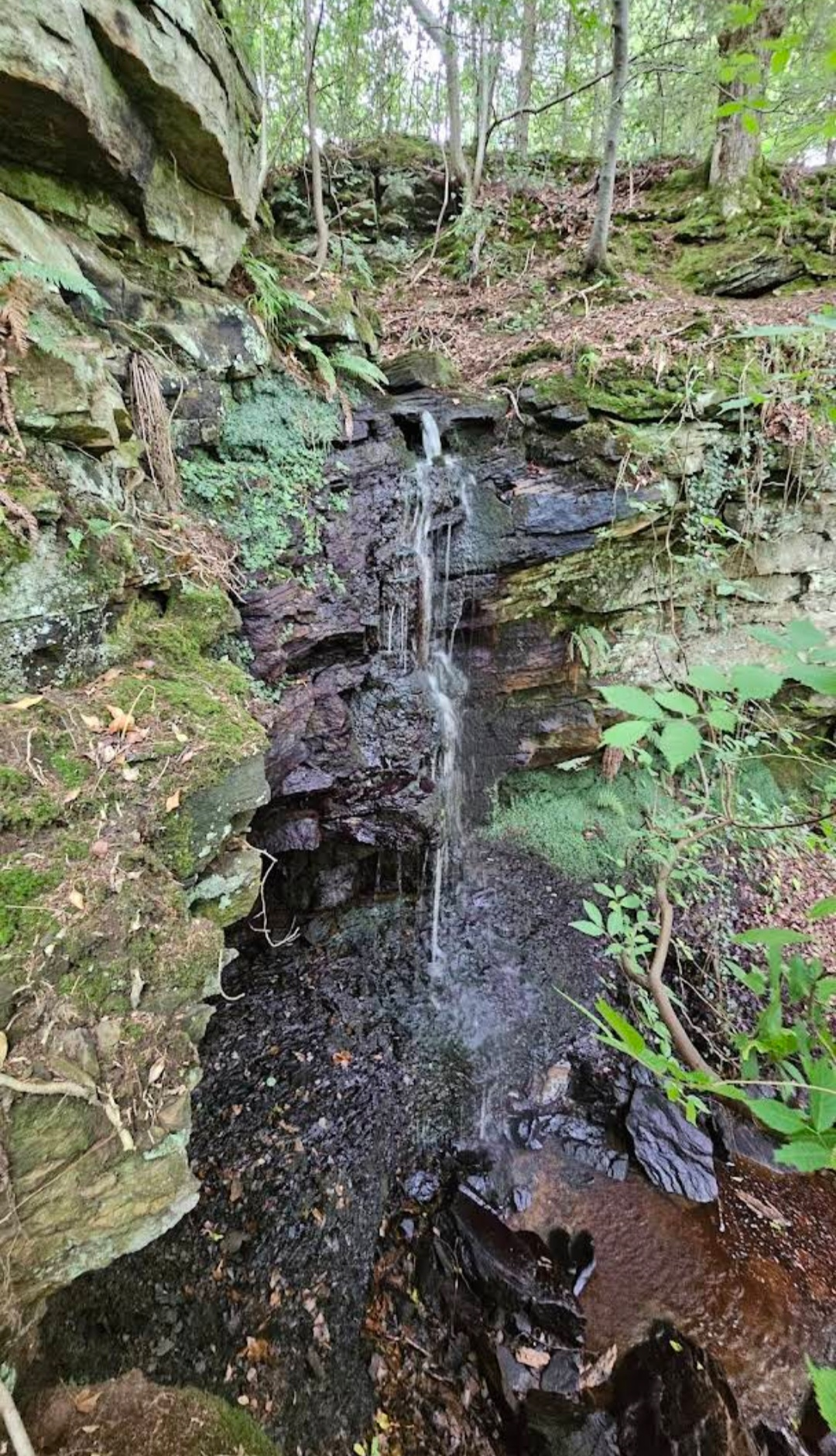
Raven's Crag Linn Waterfall on Bog Wood Burn, just before it also enters the River Derwent near Allensford.

Allensford is a small country park and hamlet in County Durham, in England. It is where the A68 trunk road crosses the River Derwent, about 2 miles SW of Consett, and 1 mile north of Castleside. A small hamlet called Mosswood is situated half a mile to the north west on the A68, completing the settlement.

Allensford was first recorded as Aleynforth in Bishop Hatfield's survey of c. 1382. The placename is sometimes listed as Allansford; "At Allansford...is a bridge over the Derwent into Northumberland, surrounded by some of the most beautiful scenery on that stream; there are a few cottages on each side of the river".

It is uncertain when a bridge replaced the ford. However, a bridge was in existence in the late 17th century when the structure was in a "very ruinous and in greate decay” according to the Northumberland Quarter Sessions for 1687–1697. The modern bridge carries the A68 between Darlington and Edinburgh over the River Derwent.

Allensford Mill farmhouse was originally called the Belsay Castle Inn, named after the estate of the Middleton family of Belsay Castle. Part of the inn was built in the late 17th century and may have been a bastle. Later additions continued throughout the 18th and 19th centuries. The inn was licensed until 1869. The upper room in the outbuilding served as a nonconformist chapel.

Denis Hayford (c.1635–1733), a pioneer of the steel industry, acquired the lease of Allensford furnace and forge in 1692; this was upstream from his established business in Shotley Bridge. The lease seems to have lapsed in 1713. The site of the furnace is marked on Ordnance Survey maps.

The brothers John (1742-1808) and George Maddison (d. 1783) were born in Allensford. They were diplomats and government officials. Their lives are commemorated in a memorial in Lanchester church.

== Attractions ==
It has a dedicated campsite. The adjacent woodland forms the Allensford Woods Local Nature Reserve, covering 17.5 hectares (43 acres). A path to the east of the campsite takes you along the Derwent, before veering sharply up hill and joining the Derwent Walk just below Consett.

The Derwent Manor Boutique Hotel is half a mile away off a side ride turning north off the A68 and is well situated for access to the North Pennines and the nearby Derwent Reservoir and Derwent Gorge areas.

There are two small waterfalls to the west of Allensford on streams running south-to-north into the River Derwent. About 400m to the west on Allensford along a public footpath is Wharnley Burn Waterfall on the Wharnley or Watergate Burn, pictured in this article. The footpath crosses a small bridge below the waterfall and continues south west into woodlands and eventually to farmland below Castleside.

About 1 km or 0.6 miles west of Allensford is Ravens' Crag Linn Waterfall on a smaller stream crossing over a steep cliff. This is accessed with difficulty through thick woodland off a spur path from the above mention Wharnley Burn footpath and anyone accessing it should be aware there is a steep drop at Ravens' Crag Waterfall itself - proceed only with great caution.

A walkable path, tarmaced for most of its length, heads south west from Mosswood and leads to Derwent Gorge where the River Derwent flows through a steeply wooded valley. The path continues as a footpath only over the River Derwent on a bridge, connecting after a steep climb to a minor road leading to Castleside and Healyfield to the south east and Muggleswick to the north. To the east this road drops sharply back into the southern part of the gorge and reaches the confluence of the Hedleyhope Burn and Hisehope Burn with an old lime kiln and two bridges marking the confluence. Both burns or rivers have small waterfalls on them. The former waterfall, Hedleyhope Linn Waterfall, is reachable via a muddy footpath quarter of a mile (400 metres) to the south starting between the two bridges. Accessing the latter waterfall, Hisehope Linn Waterfall in a very steep gorge to the west, is not recommended.

A footpath to the east along the River Derwent from just north of the houses on the north side of Allensford Bridge leads east to Shotley Grove. After crossing Wallishwalls Burn where there is a further very small double-waterfall, there is a weir and fish pass after 2 miles (3.2 km) on the Derwent and then two bridges crossing north to south over the Derwent. Shotley Bridge is reached after following this route for 3 miles or 5 kilometres.
