= Paul McNally =

Paul McNally may refer to:

- Paul McNally (astronomer) (1890–1955), American astronomer and Jesuit priest
- Paul McNally (footballer) (born 1949), English footballer
