= Benfieldside =

Coordinates: 54°52′04″N 1°51′25″W

- St Cuthbert's

- Location within County Durham
- Population: 6,637 (2001 census)
- Unitary authority: County Durham
- Ceremonial county: Durham
- Region: North East
- Country: England
- Sovereign state: United Kingdom

Benfieldside is a settlement in County Durham, England. Although not a village in its own right (ecclesiastically it incorporates Shotley Bridge, Bridgehill and much of Blackhill), it is signposted and locally known. The name 'Benfieldside' survives in Benfieldside Road, a school of that name, the local tennis club and the church. Its post office no longer exists, though one remains in the village of Shotley Bridge. The Parish Church is dedicated to St. Cuthbert and is on Church Bank. The area is directly to the north of Consett, to which it is effectively attached.

== Governance ==
It is a ward of Consett with a population taken at the 2011 census of 6,637.

Benfieldside was formerly a township and chapelry in the parish of Lanchester, in 1866 Benfieldside became a separate civil parish, in 1894 Benfieldside became an urban district, on 1 April 1937 the parish and urban district were abolished and merged with Consett. In 1931 the parish had a population of 9193. It is in the unparished area of Consett.
