= Satley =

Village and civil parish in County Durham, England

Coordinates: 54.78492°N 1.8182°W

- Location within County Durham
- Population: 292
- OS grid reference: NZ1178943185
- Civil parish: Satley
- Unitary authority: County Durham
- Ceremonial county: County Durham
- Region: North East
- Country: England
- Sovereign state: United Kingdom
- Post town: Bishop Auckland
- Postcode district: DL13
- Dialling code: 01388
- Police: Durham
- Fire: County Durham and Darlington
- Ambulance: North East
- UK Parliament: City of Durham

Satley is a village and civil parish in County Durham, England, with a population of 292 in 2001, falling to 282 at the 2011 Census. It is situated six miles to the south of Consett on the B6296 road near the A68. The village of Satley lies in a narrow valley between Lanchester and Tow Law. It was long ago part of the large parish of Lanchester, but has become a parish in its own right in 1834. The Satley Parish Council meets often and is part of the County Durham Association of Local Councils, they attempt to solve issues in the village by meeting with Durham County Council or solving them internally.

Satley has a long history, with archaeological evidence dating back as far as the Bronze Age, even today buildings such as the church which was built in 1816 still stands. Today Satley is a thriving village in the farming community. Many of the local services have shut down and many of the locals commute further afield to work, but many basic local facilities still remain. The farming village is also near the tourist attraction Hall Hill Farm.

Oddly, the village has the dialling code 01388 which is generally thought of as a South Durham area code, most notably for Bishop Auckland however the village is very firmly a North Durham village, having previously been administered by Derwentside District Council.

== History ==
The earliest archaeological evidence for inhabitants comes from the Bronze Age. A flint arrowhead probably used for warfare or hunting was found near the village, as well as a stone hammer found near Satley Grange. Also two ancient British graves have been found, the first at Satley Grange, the latter between East and West Bustfield. Both contained human remains and burial urns. The Romans settled nearby, as they built a fort at Lanchester, although there is little evidence to suggest activity. The road through the village originated as a track from the Roman fort at Lanchester to the one at Weardale. Romans coins have also been found in the area. The actual village of Satley is of late Anglo –Saxon or Medieval date. The “-ley” in the village name shows that the Anglo-Saxons named the village as it stood in a clearing in a wooded area. But it is clear that the Victorians influenced the layout of the village, as the basic plan of the village is rows of houses arranged along a main street, suggesting late 11th, early 12 the century.

=== The Church and School ===
The focus of the village is the stone-built church, dedicated to St Cuthbert, the church was restored from ruins in 1870. The house by the churchyard gate was built in 1816, costing only £120. This replaced Satley's original school which was two thatched cottages which were erected in 1790. The school was in use until 1846. This was built on the other side of the churchyard gate. This went on to serve Satley for over 100 years. This was closed in 1965 to make a new, modern school. This was to be built in a field behind the houses in Glebeside. But this only lasted until 1979 when it also closed. Now there is no school in Satley and when it closed as a school in 1965, the building by the churchyard gate became Satleys's Parish Hall.

== Transport ==
=== Airports ===
Newcastle International Airport is 22 miles north of Satley.

Teesside International Airport is 30 miles southeast of Satley.

=== Bus ===
The bus service through Satley stopped in 2011, it used to be very infrequent but now doesn't run at all and most residents are reliant on a car. The bus service was between Wolsingham and Consett which will divert into Satley if the driver is so requested or if a phone request is made the day before. For school children in Satley there is a school bus which runs from Satley to Wolsingham (school).

=== Train ===
Satley has no railway station and many stations are at least reasonable bus ride or drive away. With the nearest being Durham station itself.

== Facilities ==
With the growth of the use of the car and the internet, combined with large retail parks, services have reduced in Satley as in many traditional English villages. The village hall is the hub of the community and is the venue for events and societies. There is bed-and-breakfast accommodation available in the village and a number of other hotels not too far from the village of Satley, as the area is popular for those wanting to take walks around the surrounding picturesque countryside and area of outstanding beauty. It is also a base for those wishing to visit Durham and the surrounding area.
