= Healeyfield =

Coordinates: 54°49′43″N 1°53′35″W

- Village
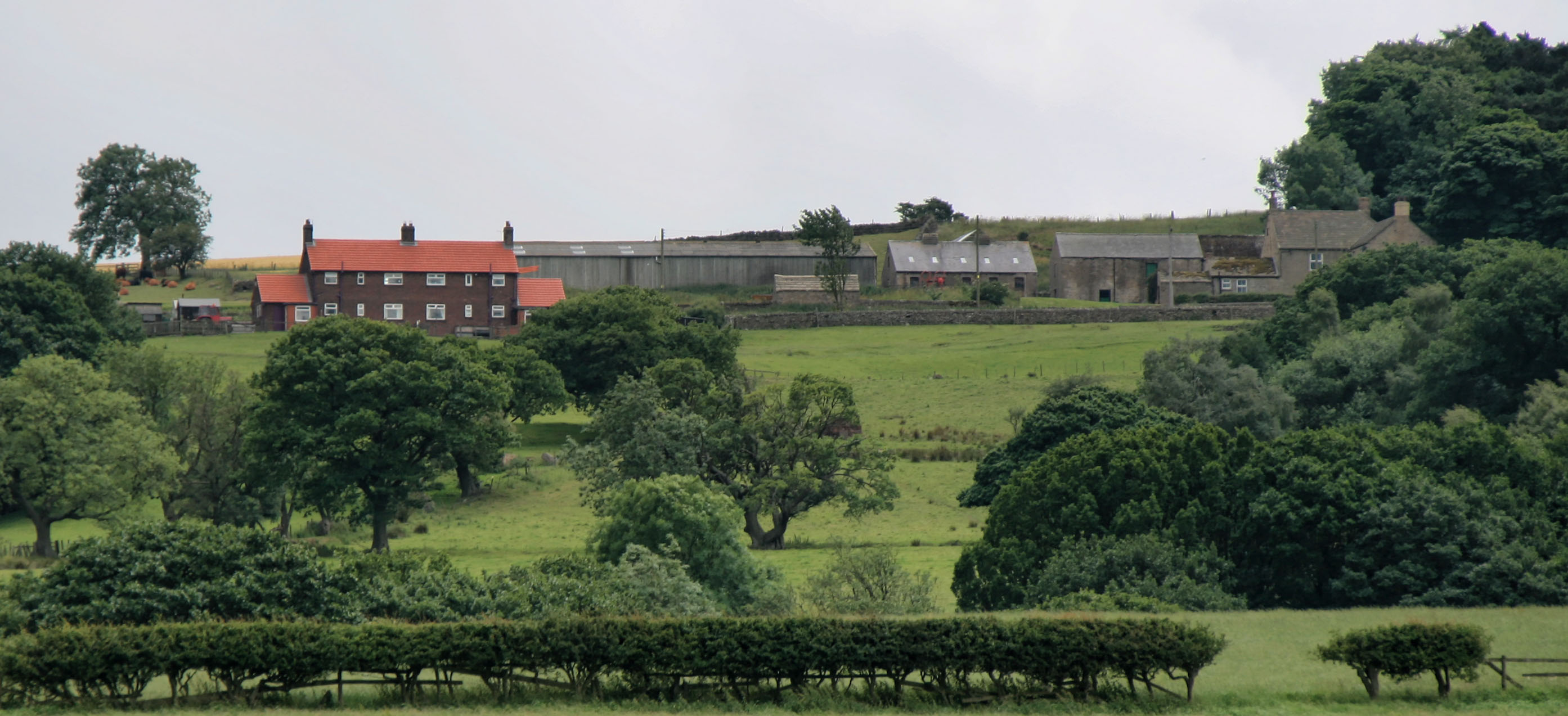
- Healeyfield
- Population: 1,544 Census 2011
- OS grid reference: NZ 06983 48205
- Region: North East
- Country: England
- Sovereign state: United Kingdom
- Ambulance: North East

Healeyfield is a village and civil parish in County Durham, England. The population of the civil parish taken from the 2011 census was 1,544. It is situated to the south west of Consett.

First documented in the Boldon Book as Heleie, “Alain de Chilton, holds Heley, as is contained in his charter, for Cornforth...”. The village is also listed in Bishops Hatfield's survey (1381) as Heley, "...being held by John de Chilton". The Chilton family seem to have held the manor and vill of Healyfield for 200 years as there is a charter of 1280 describing John of Chilton as Lord of Heleyfield (sic). As part of bishop Hugh du Puiset's extension and protection of his demesne, agriculture was pushed in the upper reaches of the Derwent valley including grants made to Healeyfield and other villages in the area. The place name probably means “the high clearing”.

There may have been a medieval chapel located at Healeyfield (though there is some confusion in the records with a chapel at Rowley). The chapel at Rowley/Healeyfield is first mentioned in 1228 and again in 1291 (as Ruley). The site of the chapel is not known though in the nineteenth century a ruin described as a chapel was noted near Healeyfield.

Healeyfield and the surrounding area had three lead mines; Healeyfield mine, Silvertongue mine and Dean Howl mine which were all disused by the 1920s. There was a smelting mill at nearby Watergate, Castleside. The mill was built in 1805 and this smelted ores from the Healeyfield mines changing over in 1913 to the smelting of lead residues. The mill ceased functioning in the 1920s.

The village was the site of a prisoner of war camp during the First World War from where two prisoners escaped. The camp was established in August 1916 and the prisoners extracted ganister from a nearby quarry.
