= Derwent Park (disambiguation) =

Derwent Park is a major sports complex in northern England.

Derwent Park may also refer to:

- Derwent Park, Tasmania, a suburb of Hobart
- Derwent Park (Rowlands Gill), a park in Tyne and Wear, England
