= Beldon Burn =

Headwater stream of the River Derwent in Northumberland and County Durham, England

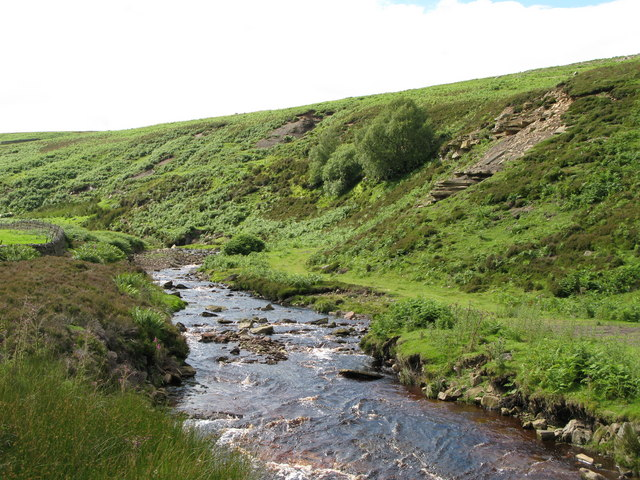
- Beldon (Quickcleugh) Burn near Heatheryburn Farm

- Location within Northumberland

Location
- Country: United Kingdom
- County: Northumberland, County Durham

Physical characteristics
- Mouth
  - coordinates: 54.8369°N 2.0881°W
- Length: 9 km (5.6 mi)
- Basin size: 19 km^{2} (7.3 sq mi)

Beldon Burn is a headwater stream of the River Derwent in Northumberland and County Durham, England.

It rises at Quickcleugh Moss as the Quickcleugh Burn in the Pennines and flows for 6 miles, becoming the Beldon Burn, which runs along the boundary between the two counties. Approximately a mile west of Blanchland, it joins Nookton Burn to form the River Derwent.

== See also ==
- List of rivers of England
