= Edmundbyers =

Village in County Durham, England

Coordinates: 54.846°N 1.976°W

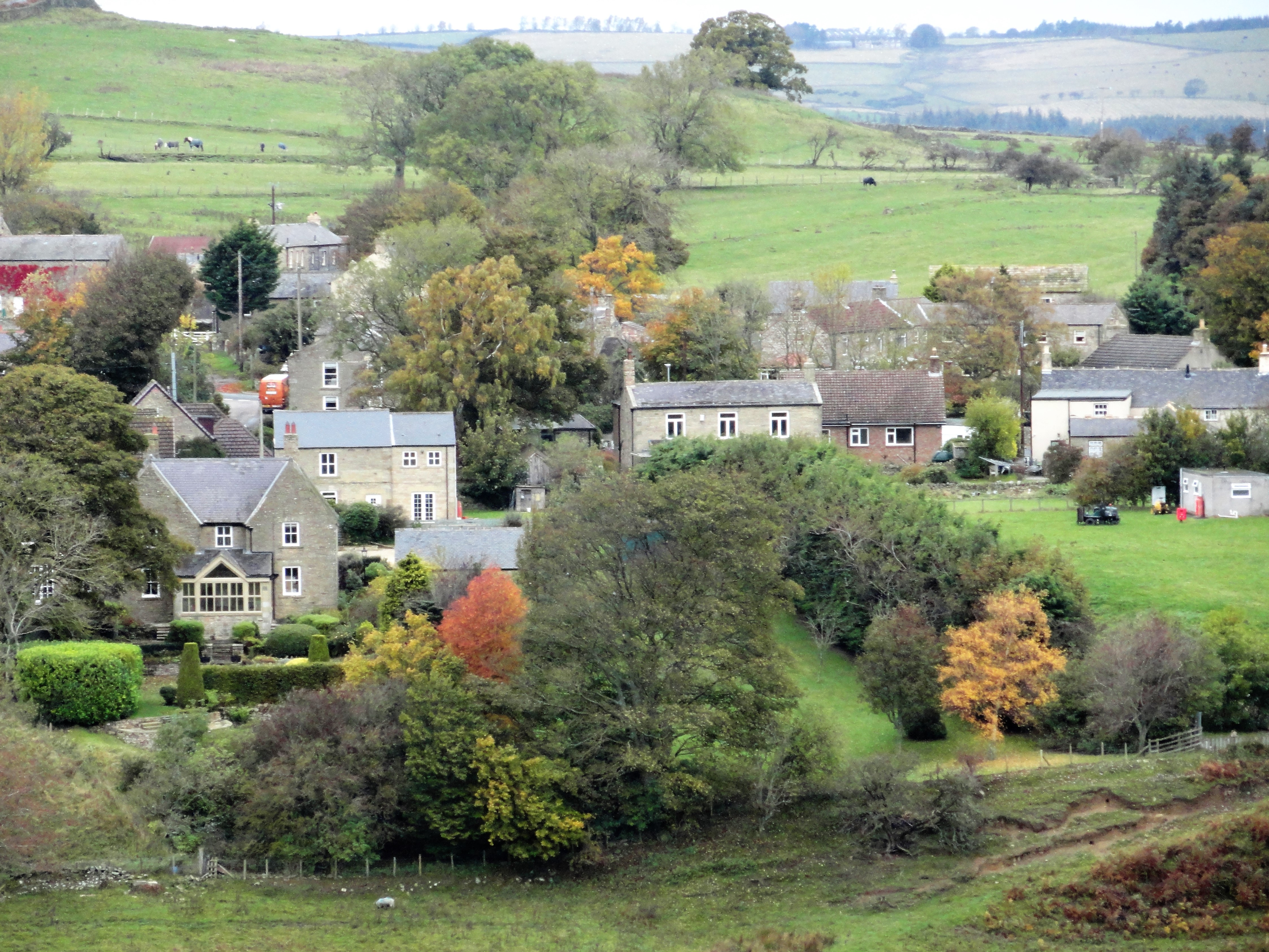
- East side

- Location within County Durham
- Population: 118 (2001 census)
- OS grid reference: NZ016501
- Civil parish: Edmondbyers
- Unitary authority: County Durham
- Ceremonial county: County Durham
- Region: North East
- Country: England
- Sovereign state: United Kingdom
- Post town: CONSETT
- Postcode district: DH8
- Dialling code: 01207
- Police: Durham
- Fire: County Durham and Darlington
- Ambulance: North East
- UK Parliament: Bishop Auckland

Edmundbyers is a village in County Durham, in England. It is situated a few miles to the west of Consett, near Derwent Reservoir. In 2001 it had a population of 118. The civil parish of Edmondbyers had a population taken at the 2011 Census of 173.

== Etymology ==
Edmundbyers means "Eādmund's dwellings", from the Old English personal name Eādmund (modern Edmund) and bur "dwelling", modern bower, here in the dialect form byer. An undated record of the name lists the village as Edminber.

== History ==
There is evidence of prehistoric settlement in the area from the Neolithic era onwards. It is listed in the Boldon Book (1183): "Alan Bruntoft holds Edmundbires for his service in the forest”. However, Bishop Hatfield's survey of c. 1382 shows that the land had been transferred to Durham Cathedral: “The Prior holds the vill of Edmundbires, sometime of Alan Bruntop, by forest service”.

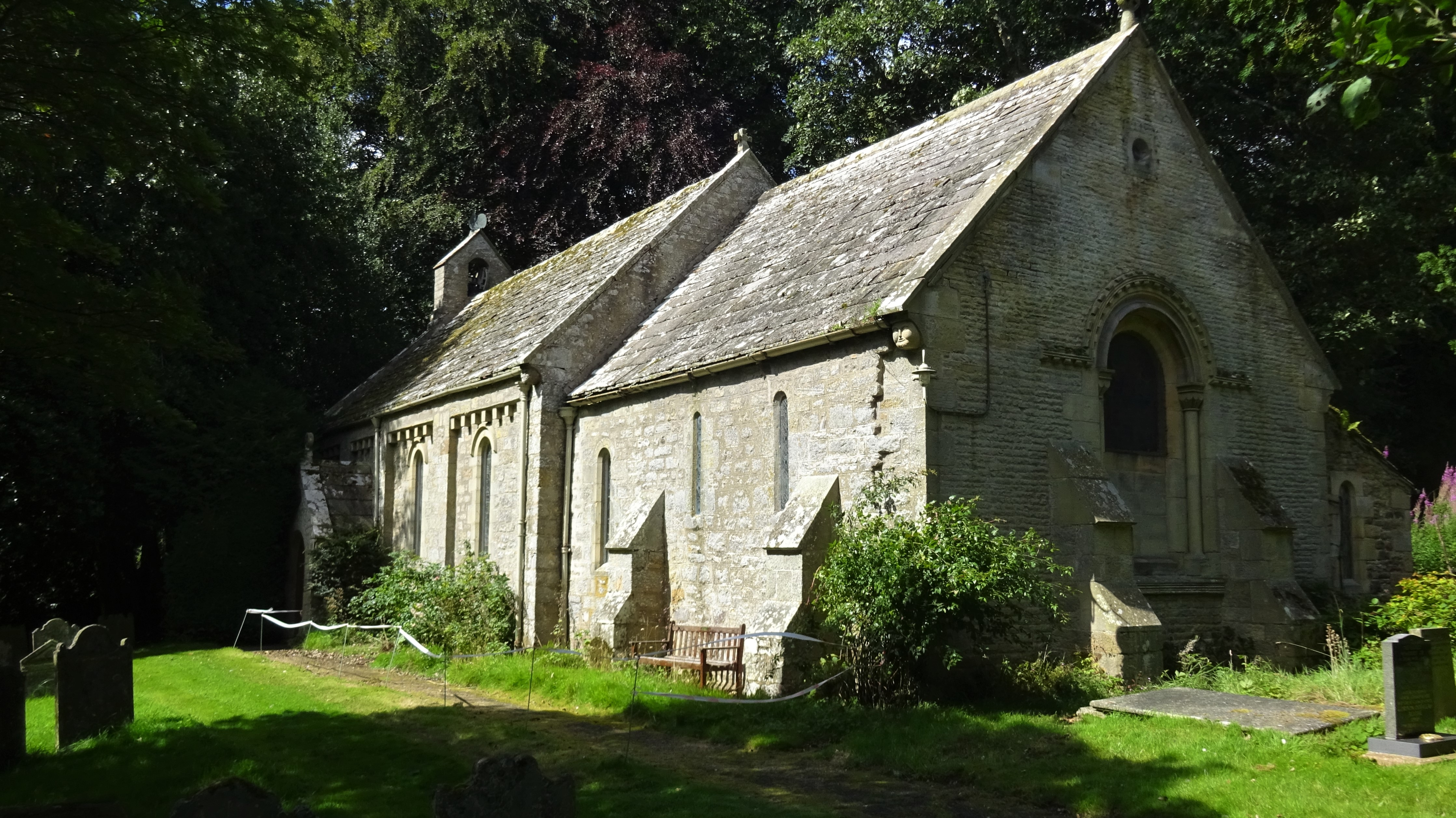
St Edmund's Church

The village church, St Edmund's, has evidence of pre-Norman building, but it mainly dates from the 12th century, with renovations from 1859 onwards. The pre-Reformation stone altar was rediscovered and replaced in the church during the restoration. There is a list of rectors beginning with Richard de Kirkeby in 1275 and ending with John Durie, A. M., on 2 July 1629. The incumbents after 1629 have also been in charge of the parish of Muggleswick.

A Wesleyan Methodist chapel was erected in 1835. The Primitive Methodists met in a private house. The parish school was erected in 1825.

The youth hostel (dated 1936 over the lintel) is made up of three houses built in the mid- to late 18th century.

Edmundbyers Cross is one of only three wayside crosses still in its original position in County Durham, and the only known example on the route between Stanhope and Edmundbyers.

== Amenities ==
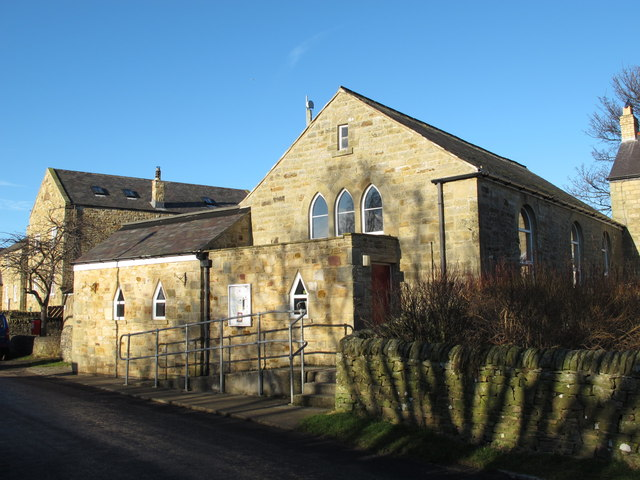
Village Hall

Today, the village has a pub, a youth hostel, a church, a village hall and a small shop. A bus service, the 773, serves the village, connecting it to Townfield, Hunstanworth and Consett.
