= Janet Graham =

English composer, educator, and music therapist (born 1948)

Janet Christine Graham
- Born: June 4, 1948 (age 78); Consett, County Durham
- Occupations: Composer and Music Therapist
- Known for: Established new music therapy projects

Janet Christine Graham (born 4 June 1948) is an English composer, music therapist, music educator, writer, organist, and bereavement-support volunteer. She studied at the Royal Academy of Music and later trained as a music therapist at the Nordoff-Robbins Centre in London.

== Early life and education ==
Graham was born on 4 June 1948 near Consett, County Durham. She attended Medomsley Church of England School and Consett Grammar School before studying at the Royal Academy of Music from 1966 to 1971. She studied composition with Elisabeth Lutyens from 1971 to 1973. Her qualifications include the LRAM (1968), GRSM (1969), a Diploma in Music Therapy from Nordoff-Robbins (1990), and a Master of Music Therapy.

== Career ==
From 1971 to 1990, Graham taught piano, composition, and harmony at Hertfordshire County Music School at the Mid Hertfordshire Music Centre in Hatfield. During this period she continued composing, primarily for chamber ensembles and solo instruments. Her works received performances and broadcasts on BBC Radio 3 and other European radio stations, and two of her compositions were selected for the BBC Young Composers' Forum in 1978.

In 1990, Graham completed postgraduate training in music therapy at the Nordoff-Robbins Centre in London with a scholarship from the Performing Rights Society. She subsequently worked as a music therapist for the National Health Service at Harperbury Hospital in Radlett and for Nordoff-Robbins, where she later became a tutor on its training course. Her clinical work included children and adults with learning disabilities, autism, and challenging behaviour.

In 2007, Graham became the first head music therapist for Nordoff-Robbins North East. She established music therapy projects in Newcastle, Sunderland, and Middlesbrough and worked in clinical settings including a hospital for young-onset dementia and a residential centre with departments for neurorehabilitation, spinal injury, and dementia. She retired from music therapy in 2013.

== Music ==
Graham has composed works for chamber ensembles, solo instruments, piano, organ, and other settings. Her compositions have been performed and broadcast in the United Kingdom and Europe. Her music has also been recorded, including on the album North East Hauntings – Piano Music by Janet Graham, performed by Aleksander Szram and released by Prima Facie in 2019.

Graham's compositions for organ have been published online by Firehead Organ Works. Her music has also been included in the British Music Collection.

=== Music therapy and publications ===
Graham has presented on music therapy at national and international conferences, including events in London, New York, Oxford, and Germany. She lectured on introductory music therapy at Durham University.

Her publications include Composing: Career or Vocation?, published in Contemporary Music Review; a chapter on assessment and evaluation in music therapy in Assessment and Evaluation in the Arts Therapies; and the article "Communicating with the uncommunicative: music therapy with pre-verbal adults", published in the British Journal of Learning Disabilities in 2004. She also contributed to Improvising in Styles: A Workbook for Music Therapists, Educators and Musicians and to the two-volume Creative Explorations and Resources for Music Therapists.

== Voluntary works ==
Following her retirement from music therapy, Graham became involved in voluntary work, including church organ playing and bereavement support. In 2016 she established BALM (Bereavement And Loss Meetings), a local bereavement-support service. She has served as a voluntary organist at St Michael's Church, Bishop Middleham, and St Mary Magdalene's Church, Trimdon.

== Awards and recognition ==
Graham received two Principal's Awards for Composition from the Royal Academy of Music in 1970 and 1971. In 1979, she received a mention certificate and medal at the Radio France XX1 Concours international de guitare for Arcus for guitar. In 2023, Meditation on a Northumbrian Song for viola received the Berwick Prize in an international composition competition. In 2024, she received the Mary McCartin Memorial Award for service to the Ferryhill community for her voluntary bereavement-support work.

== Works ==
Selected works include:

- Pieces for organ: No.1, Prelude
- Pieces for organ: No.2, Lament
- Pieces for organ: No.3, Toccata
- North East Hauntings. 1. Snow Sky
- North East Hauntings. 2. Sea Mist
- North East Hauntings. 3. Lullaby for Lost Skylines
- North East Hauntings. 4. Red Dust
- Quartet for flute, violin, viola and cello
- Evening Flights
- Soliloquium
- This Great and Wide Sea
- Persephone
- Crux
- Epitaphs
- Diversitas
- Atque in perpetuum
- Cras amet
- When I Was Young
- The Light
- Ca' Hawkie through the water
- Cradle Song
- Eighty Notes for James
- Quest
- Earth Cry
- Tractor and Plough
- From Dusk to Dawn
- Two Winter Songs
- Two Christmas Motets
- Until the Sunset Hour
- Iris
- Hecate
- Four Pieces for Four Bass Clarinets
- Canta mihi aliquid
- Three Pieces
- String Quartet No. 4

Her music has been recorded and issued on CD, including:

- Contemporary Music for Organ Performer: Kevin Bowyer, Audio CD (March 23, 1999) Nimbus Records, ASIN B00000IGNJ
