= Arthur Bellamy =

English footballer

Personal information
- Full name: Arthur Bellamy
- Date of birth: 5 April 1942
- Place of birth: Blackhill, England
- Date of death: 22 January 2014 (aged 71)
- Place of death: Brierfield, England
- Height: 5 ft 9 in (1.75 m)
- Position: Inside forward

Youth career
- 1958–1962: Burnley

Senior career*
Years	Team	Apps	(Gls)
1962–1972	Burnley	227	(29)
1972–1976	Chesterfield	133	(12)
Total		350	(41)
- * Club domestic league appearances and goals

Arthur Bellamy (5 April 1942 – 22 January 2014) was an English footballer who played as an inside forward for Burnley and Chesterfield.

== Biography ==
Arthur Bellamy was born on 5 April 1942 in the village of Blackhill, County Durham. As a youngster, he supported Sunderland. He worked as an apprentice welder with the Consett Iron Company before becoming a professional footballer. After his playing career ended, he lived in Burnley where he worked as a milkman and later owned a fish and chip shop. In 1979, he returned to Burnley F.C. as reserve team coach before being appointed assistant manager under Brian Miller in 1986. He then became youth coach under Frank Casper and later head groundsman at Turf Moor, before retiring in April 2007. Upon his retirement, he was presented a lifetime achievement award by Burnley manager Steve Cotterill.

== Football career ==
Bellamy was spotted at the age of 15 by Burnley scout Jack Hixon while playing for the Consett Iron Company works team and was offered a trial at the club in 1958. He was offered a professional deal by Burnley manager Harry Potts in 1959 and spent the first three years of his career in the junior and reserve sides. He was part of the Burnley 'A' and reserve sides that won the Lancashire League and Central League respectively during the 1961–62 season. Bellamy scored on his first-team debut in the 5–2 victory over Manchester City on 26 March 1963. He made another 12 appearances during the remainder of the season, scoring once more. The 1963–64 campaign proved to be Bellamy's most prolific as he netted 8 goals in 17 league matches. He never established himself as a first-team regular during 10 seasons with Burnley, playing in around half the team's matches each year. His highest number of matches played in a season came in 1967–68 when he appeared in 38 league and cup games. In total, Bellamy amassed 250 appearances for the club in all competitions, scoring 29 goals.

Bellamy transferred to Third Division outfit Chesterfield in July 1972 for a fee of £10,000 and made his league debut for the club on 12 August 1972 in the 4–1 home win against Oldham Athletic. In contrast to his time with Burnley, Bellamy was a regular fixture in the Chesterfield side throughout his four seasons with the club. He went on to make 133 league appearances and score 12 league goals for Chesterfield before being released in the summer of 1976 and subsequently retiring from football.

Bellamy died in Pendleside hospice near Burnley on the morning of 22 January 2014.
