= The Grove, County Durham =

Village in County Durham, England

Coordinates: 54.846°N 1.860°W

The Grove
- Location within County Durham
- OS grid reference: NZ090501
- Unitary authority: County Durham
- Ceremonial county: County Durham
- Region: North East
- Country: England
- Sovereign state: United Kingdom
- Post town: Durham
- Postcode district: DH8
- Police: Durham
- Fire: County Durham and Darlington
- Ambulance: North East

The Grove is a village in County Durham, in England. It is situated to the south of Consett.

The Grove is a post-World War II housing estate. Originally part of the Consett manor with Consett Hall being located near the current Hallgarth area. The estate was probably named after Consett Grove originally located a little south of Selby Lodge in the current Selby Gardens area. The buildings at Consett Grove seem to have been demolished around the early 1960s (no longer appearing on the Ordnance Survey maps).

The Methodist church was built in 1938 (as noted on the foundation stones).
