= Hall Hill Farm =

Tourist attraction in County Durham, England

Coordinates: 54°47′27″N 1°48′16″W

Hall Hill Farm is a tourist attraction located in County Durham, near Tow Law, England.

== History ==
Ann Darlington is the current tourism manager at Hall Hill Farm. Her grandparents came to the farm in 1925, and now her brother David Gibson runs the working farm. Hall Hill Farm opened to the public in 1981 after Ann and David's father, Jack Gibson, suggested allowing the public to see the farm's lambs, following an interest over that Easter period.

== Site ==
Hall Hill Farm covers 290 hectares (720 acres), consisting of 140 hectares (350 acres) of grassland (for over a thousand sheep), 40 hectares (99 acres) of woodland, and the remainder for crops of wheat, barley and oil seed rape.

The animals available for the public to see include llamas, wallabies and Highland cattle. There are also more traditional creatures; chicks, lambs, pigs, donkeys, ponies and rabbits.
