= River Derwent, North East England =

River in North East England

River Derwent
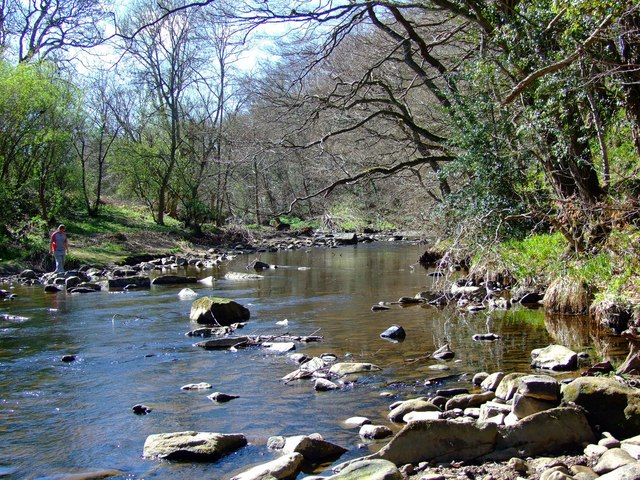
- Derwent near Allensford

- Location of the mouth within Tyne and Wear

Location
- Country: United Kingdom
- County: Northumberland; County Durham; Tyne and Wear

Physical characteristics
- Mouth
  - location: River Tyne
  - coordinates: 54.9635°N 1.6794°W

Basin features
- Tributaries
  - left: Thornley Burn, Pallis Burn, Mill Burn, Small Burn, Mere Burn, Shotleyfield Burn, Letch Burn, Walliswalls Burn
  - right: Clock Burn, Snipes Dene, Leapmill Burn, Pont Burn, Ebchester Burn, Snow's Green Burn, Howden Burn, Dene Burn, Wharnley Burn, Horsleyhope Burn, Muggleswick Burn, Burnhope Burn, Near Haw Burn, Far Haw Burn, Bolt's Burn

The River Derwent is a river which flows between the historic county boundaries of Durham and Northumberland, and in the ceremonial county of Tyne and Wear, in North East England. It then enters the Derwent Reservoir near Edmundbyers, west of Consett. The River Derwent then flows through the Derwent Gorge, past Allensford, Shotley Bridge, Blackhall Mill, Rowlands Gill, Gibside estate and the Nine Arches Viaduct near Derwenthaugh Country Park. The Derwent is a tributary of the River Tyne, which it joins at Derwenthaugh near Gateshead.

== Etymology ==
The name Derwent comes from the Brythonic/Early Welsh word for oak derw and valley -went.

== Course ==
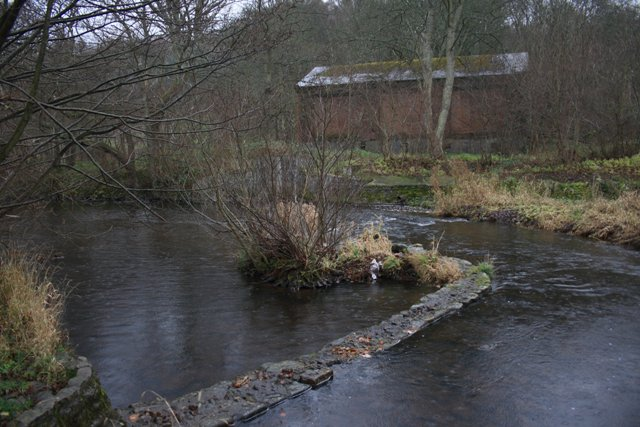
Disused Weir, River Derwent, just south west of Shotley Bridge. The building behind is an old pump house.

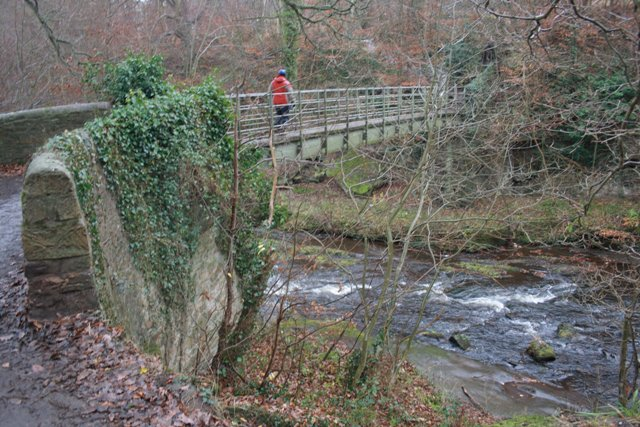
Shotley Grove Footbridge over the River Derwent just south west of Shotley Bridge

The River Derwent flows for 35 miles from its origin, where two streams, Beldon Burn and Nookton Burn meet approximately a mile west of Blanchland, to Derwenthaugh where it flows into the River Tyne (the confluence is between Blaydon near the Scotswood Bridge and the MetroCentre complex). On its journey, the River Derwent flows into and through Derwent Reservoir near Edmundbyers (with Waskerley Moor to the south), then places such as Muggleswick, the Derwent Gorge and Horsleyhope Ravine, Allensford, Shotley Grove (known for its fish pass), Shotley Bridge, Blackhall Mill and Rowlands Gill where it passes the Gibside Estate before flowing under the Nine Arches Viaduct. The Derwent Walk Country Park at Rowlands Gill is named after the river.

== Wildlife ==
Brown trout (Salmo trutta) and European grayling (Thymallus thymallus) are present in the Derwent, and are open for fly catching on Tyne Rivers Trust website. Other aquatic species present include Eurasian minnow (Phoxinus phoxinus), Signal crayfish (Pacifastacus leniusculus), and Common barbel (Barbus barbus).

== In popular literature ==
The Muggleswick-born writer, John Carr, wrote a 40 verse poem "Ode to the River Derwent".
