= Derwent Park (Rowlands Gill) =

Park in Tyne and Wear, England

Coordinates: 54.931°N 1.734°W

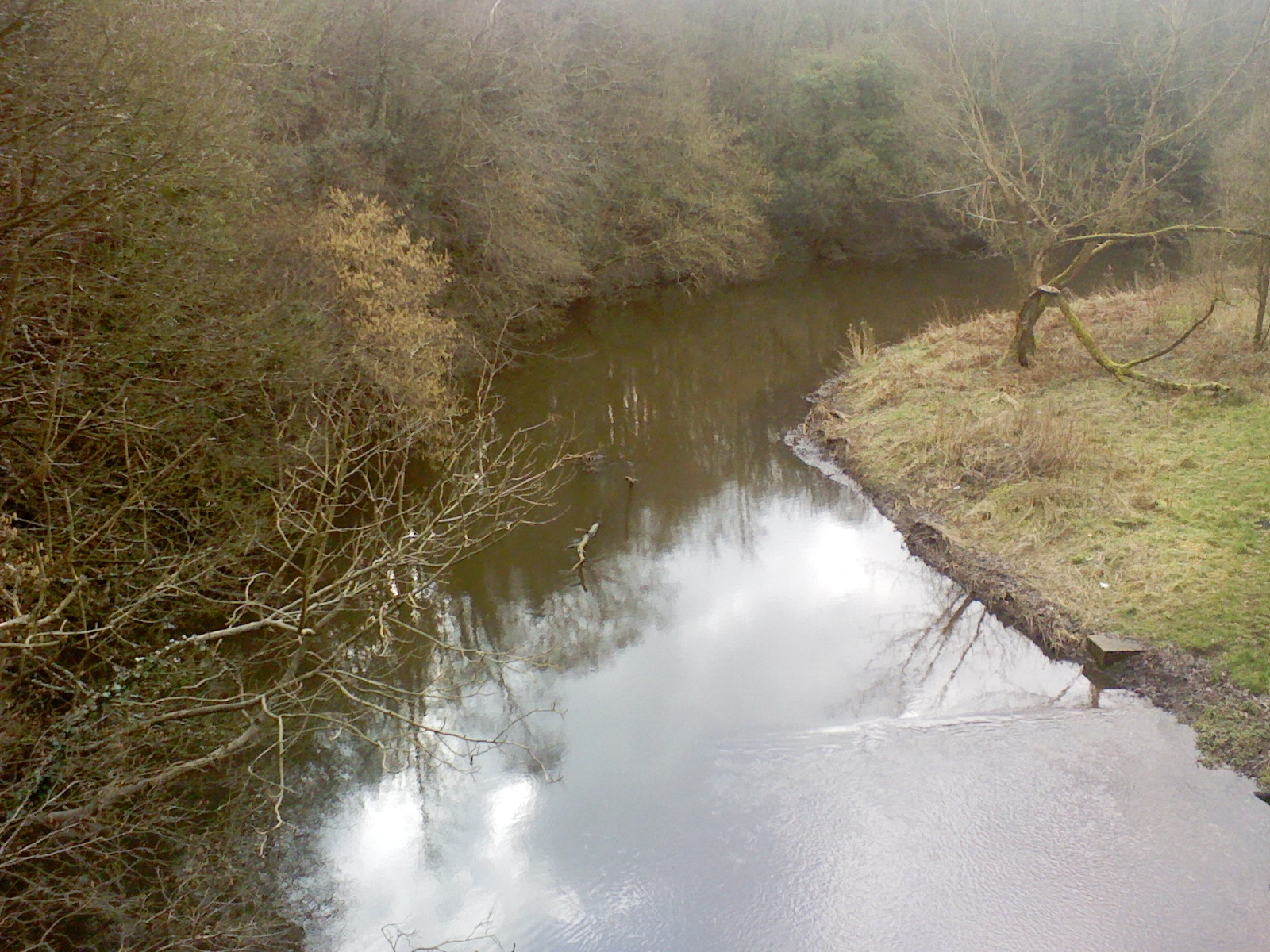
A view of River Derwent from the park

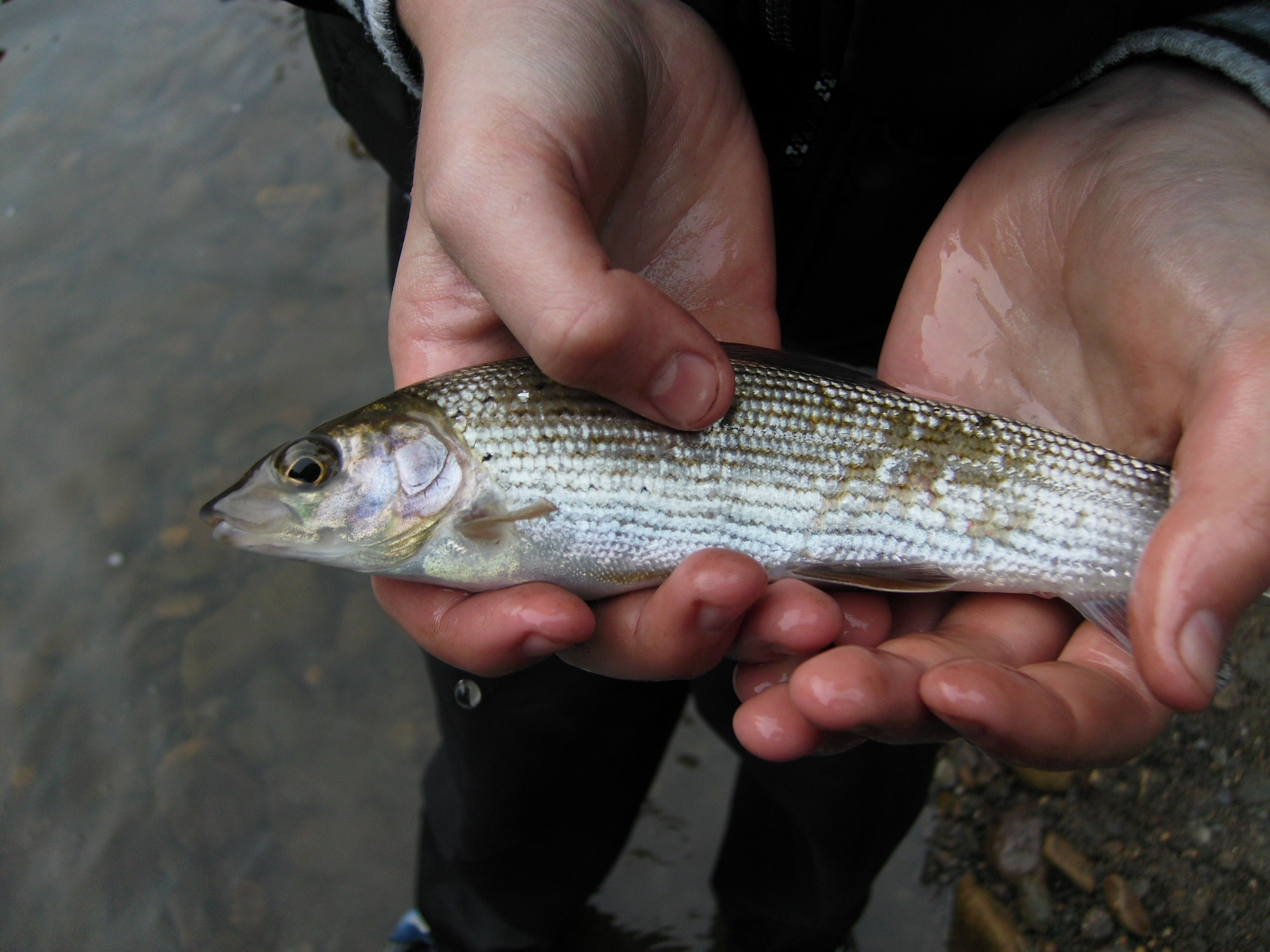
A grayling caught at Derwent Park

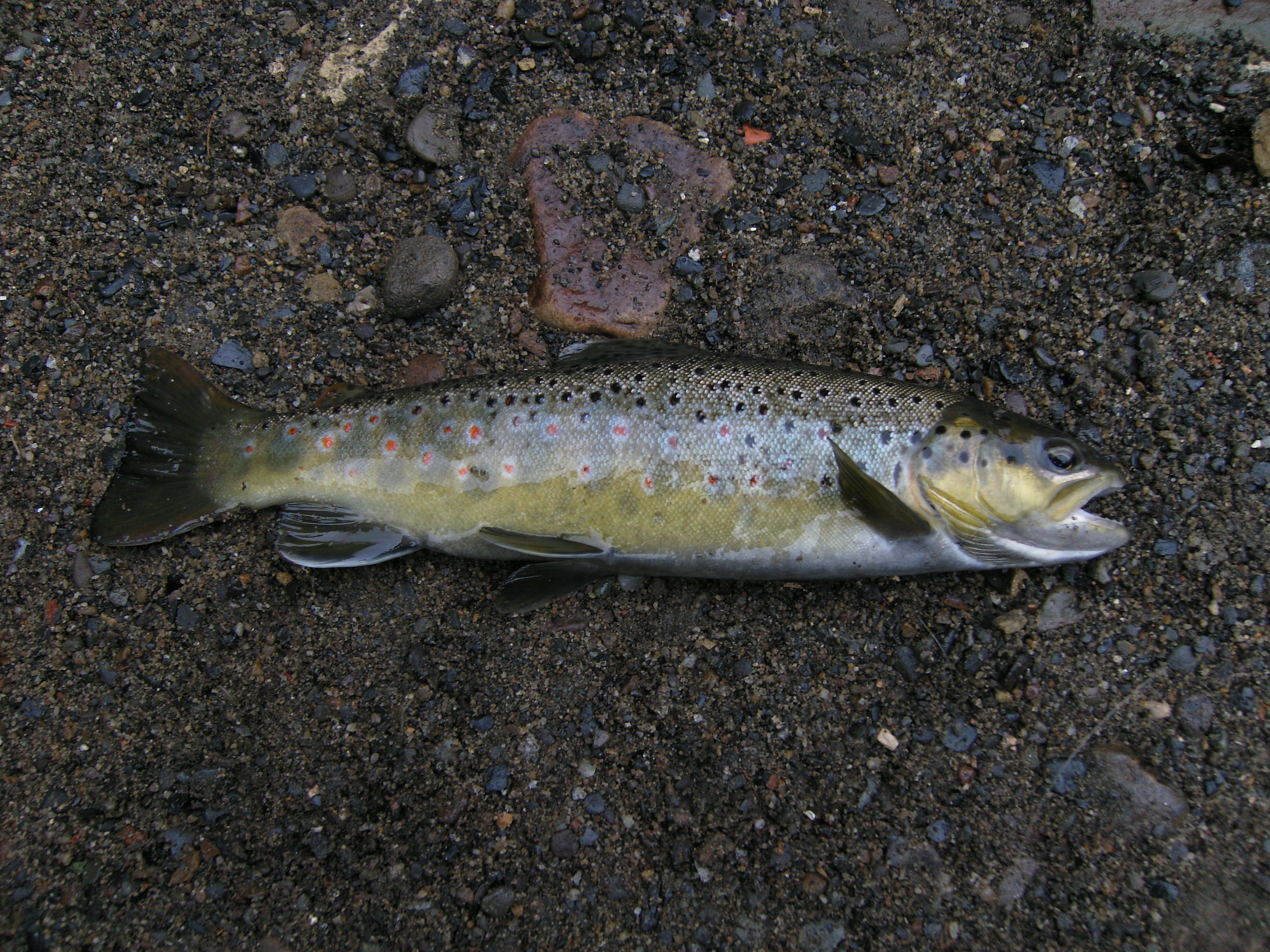
A brown trout caught at Derwent Park

Derwent Park is situated in Rowlands Gill, Tyne and Wear, England. The park is often incorrectly called Rowlands Gill Park as a result. The park has a caravan site and has many play areas for children. Fishing on the River Derwent, which runs through the park, is priced at £2.50 per permit. The fish include brown trout, grayling and Atlantic salmon.
