= Paul McNally (footballer) =

English footballer

Personal information
- Full name: Paul Anthony McNally
- Date of birth: 19 December 1949 (age 76)
- Place of birth: Consett, England
- Position: Inside forward

Senior career*
Years	Team	Apps	(Gls)
- Consett
1967–1969	Bradford City	3	(0)
1969–1970	Dover		
1970–1971	Ashford Town		
- * Club domestic league appearances and goals

Paul Anthony McNally (born 19 December 1949) is an English former professional footballer who played as an inside forward.

== Career ==
Born in Consett, McNally joined Bradford City from Consett in June 1967. He made 3 league appearances for the club. He was released by the Bradford in 1969 and moved to Southern League Dover. After one season there he played at Ashford Town.

== Sources ==
- Frost, Terry (1988). Bradford City A Complete Record 1903-1988. Breedon Books Sport. ISBN 0-907969-38-0.
