= Mitch Laddie =

English singer (born 1990)

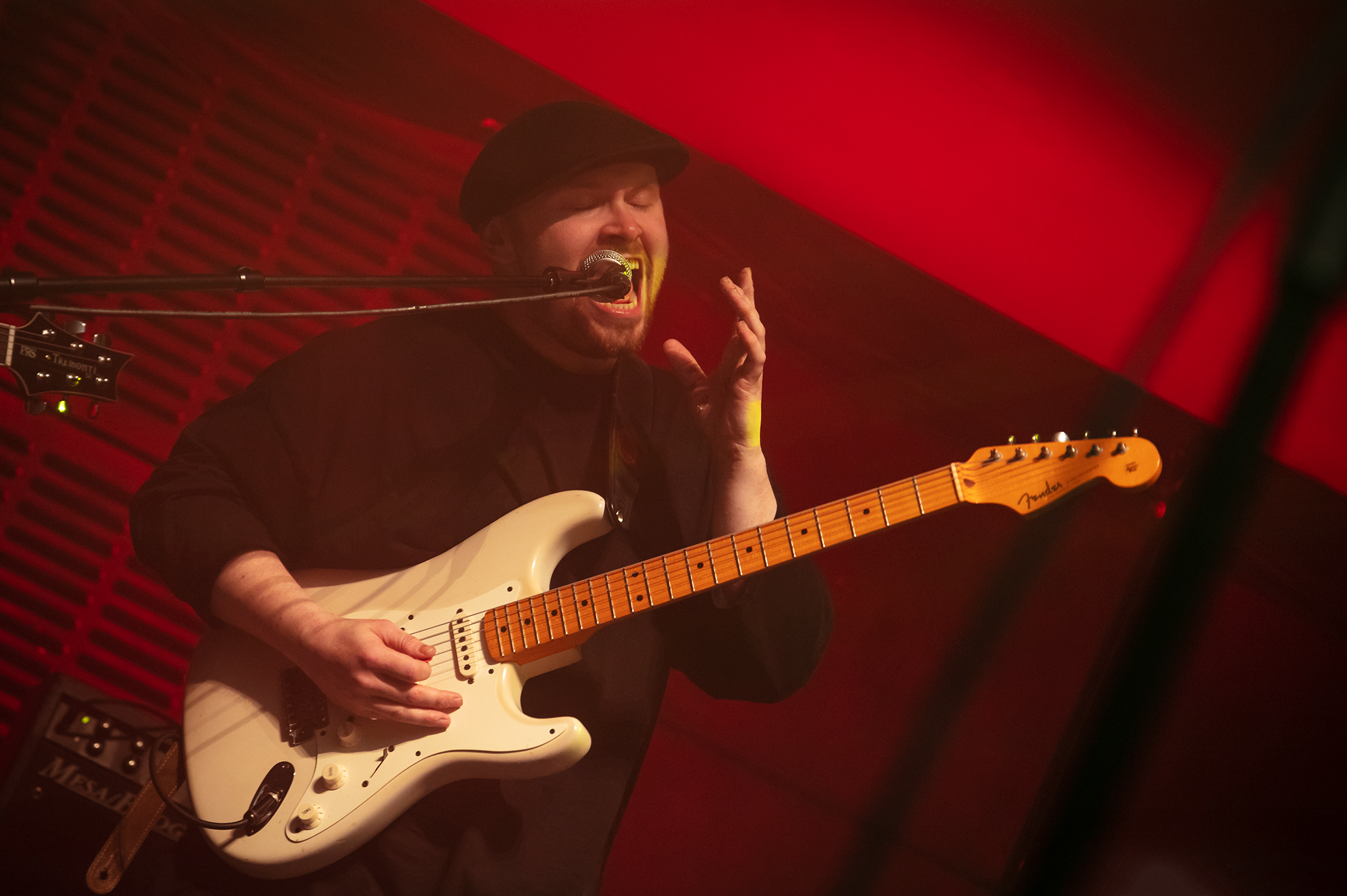
- Laddie in 2019

Background information
- Born: Mitchell Thomas Laddie; 24 September 1990 (age 36); Shotley Bridge, County Durham, England
- Genres: Blues, Soul, Funk, Rock
- Occupations: Guitarist, singer, songwriter
- Instrument: Guitar
- Years active: 2004–present
- Labels: Provogue, Mystic, MLBP, Test Dream Productions

Mitchell Thomas Laddie (born 24 September 1990) is an English guitarist, vocalist, songwriter, producer and tutor from Consett, County Durham. He was born in Shotley Bridge, County Durham, and raised in Ebchester.

Blues & Soul has described Laddie as "the most exciting young blues player of the current bunch and probably the only serious prospect for major global success this country has produced in several decades". His 2012 album Burning Bridges also won Blues & Soul's "Album of the Year".

Alongside his recording and performing career, Laddie is a noted guitar tutor and educator, contributing instructional courses to the online guitar education platform Lick Library. His courses cover a range of subjects, including blues improvisation, guitar technique, phrasing, rhythm and contemporary styles such as neo-soul.

== Early life ==
He was born in Shotley Bridge, County Durham, England, and grew up in Ebchester, County Durham. He is of Irish descent. Influenced by his grandfather's love of music and his parents' record collection, which included blues and prog rock, Laddie was drawn to music from an early age. Growing up in a house full of guitars, he became fascinated with the instrument and often picked up and played with his father's Stratocaster. At the age of five, he discovered Motown music and was later influenced by artists such as Michael Jackson and Stevie Wonder.

After a sporting injury at the age of 13, Laddie was hospitalised for several months. It was during this time he began playing guitar seriously, influenced by Jimi Hendrix, Chuck Berry and David Gilmour. Upon discovering Stevie Ray Vaughan his love of blues music was rekindled, leading to influence from Albert King, B. B. King, Walter Trout and Vaughan. He formed his first band, Vanilla Moon at the age of 14 with school friends, along with longtime collaborator Rhian Wilkinson. During his mid-teens, Laddie's influences began to expand into jazz, soul, funk and fusion, from artists such as Kenny Burrell, Miles Davis, James Brown, Prince, D'Angelo, Eric Johnson and Robben Ford.

== Career ==
=== Early career – This Time Around (2006–2010) ===
Laddie met the blues guitarist Walter Trout at the age of 15, and was asked to join the guitarist on stage the following year. This led to further appearances around the UK and in the Netherlands. It was during a performance with Trout at the Paradiso in Amsterdam that landed him his first recording contract with Provogue Records at the age of 17.

Laddie's debut album This Time Around was recorded in 2009, produced by Laddie and released in 2010 on Mascot Label Group, gaining positive critical response from Classic Rock and receiving airplay on various radio stations, including BBC Radio 2. The album was promoted with a UK and European tour with Walter Trout Band and a UK tour with fellow Provogue artist Scott McKeon.

=== Burning Bridges (2011–2013) ===
Laddie later moved to UK-based Mystic Records, and his follow-up album Burning Bridges was recorded in 2011 and released in 2012, again produced by Laddie. The album was received to critical acclaim, gaining press coverage from Classic Rock, Blues & Soul, Rock'n'Reel and Blues Matters! as well as coverage on various radio stations. Laddie also recorded a live session at Maida Vale for BBC Radio 2. The album was later voted joint 'Album of the Year' by Blues & Soul in 2012, tied with the Tedeschi Trucks Band. The album was promoted with various UK and European tours, alongside Johnny Winter, Royal Southern Brotherhood and Walter Trout.

=== Live in Concert and Mitch Laddie Band (2013–2014) ===
Laddie revamped his band line-up in late 2012 and later branded himself as the Mitch Laddie Band in 2013. The band's first move was to give in to fan demand and release a live album. Live in Concert was recorded on 13 September 2013 at The Cluny, Newcastle-upon-Tyne, to a sell out show and released in early 2014. The album featured new tracks "Linger" and "Open Your Eyes (Take It Back)" which became tracks on the band's next studio album. Mitch Laddie Band played the Royal Albert Hall in 2014 as part of "BluesFest", sharing the stage with Sheryl Crow, Robert Cray and Gregory Porter.

=== Let You Go (2015–2017) ===
In 2015, Mitch Laddie broke away from Mystic Records and formed the independent record label "MLBP" and began work on his third studio album, Let You Go with the Mitch Laddie Band. MLBP set a goal to write, record, engineer and produce an album on their own with no outside influence. The album was recorded over the period of four months at the band's personal studios at Steel Town Music in County Durham. The album was independently released under the MLBP label in September 2015 and was praised for the band's songwriting, production and change of direction, citing a soul and R&B influence. Classic Rock magazine said "It's time to get funky as this Blues Man becomes a Soul brother" and Blues Rock Review saying "Once you listen to Let You Go, you will understand why The Mitch Laddie Band are popular in the UK. They have the ability to bring a variety of sounds together successfully, creating unique music that will get you groovin'".

=== Another World (2018–2019) ===
2018 saw Mitch Laddie's fourth studio album Another World released on MLBP with the Mitch Laddie Band, and again recorded at the band's personal studios. Another World saw the band heading back towards their blues roots yet providing a kaleidoscopic palette for the genre throughout the record. Of the album, Blues Rock Review said "'Another World' is a strong compendium of material that deserves attention... Eclectic, that's the word. Mitch Laddie and his band from the North East of England are not one-trick ponies. Laddie clearly knows his Hendrix, but isn't in thrall to him. Vocally he's at ease with soulful and funky, but can give it a bit oomph, too. He can throw in some jazzy tweaks that suggest Steely Dan, but balance that with blues rock grit. And he can get rootsy, but can do it with a dash of imagination." This album also saw the addition of a guest member in saxophonist Johnny 'Bluehat' Davis, known for his work with Sam Fender.

=== Wave of Illusion (2019–2020) ===
In late 2019, Laddie took some time away from Mitch Laddie Band, forming a new independent record label, Test Dream Productions, and began work on a solo project that would see him recording all instruments and undertaking all production responsibilities. After releasing singles "Musk" and "Dirty Kink", Laddie announced that a new solo album would be released on his 30th birthday, the 24 September 2020. The album was completed at Laddie's home studio during the COVID-19 pandemic in the United Kingdom. Wave of Illusion saw a break away from the blues, with influences from Prince, Michael Jackson and Kate Bush.

=== Faith and Other Bad Habits (2025) ===
On 20 June 2025, Laddie released his sixth studio album, Faith and Other Bad Habits, through his independent record label, Test Dream Productions. The ten-track album marked a return towards his blues roots following the stylistic departure of Wave of Illusion, incorporating elements of soul, funk, jazz, contemporary R&B and rock. It featured harmonica player Will Wilde on "She Keeps Me Down", alongside Rhian Wilkinson on bass and Matt Connor on drums.

The album received positive reviews from Blues Matters!, which described it as "a masterclass in modern blues soul-rock", and Blues Rock Review, which praised its production, guitar work and vocal performances. Blues in Britain also highlighted its stylistic diversity and the contributions of Laddie's longtime rhythm section Rhian Wilkinson and Matt Connor. Tracks including "50 Shades of Blue", "Angels & Demons" and the instrumental "Hinode" showcased the album's varied musical arrangements and Laddie's development as a songwriter and producer.

== Discography ==
- This Time Around (2010) Provogue
- Burning Bridges (2012) Mystic Records
- Live in Concert (2014) Mystic Records
- Let You Go (2015) MLBP
- Another World (2018) MLBP
- Wave of Illusion (2020) Test Dream Productions
- Faith and Other Bad Habits (2025) Test Dream Productions
