= Derwent Reservoir (North East England) =

Reservoir in North East England

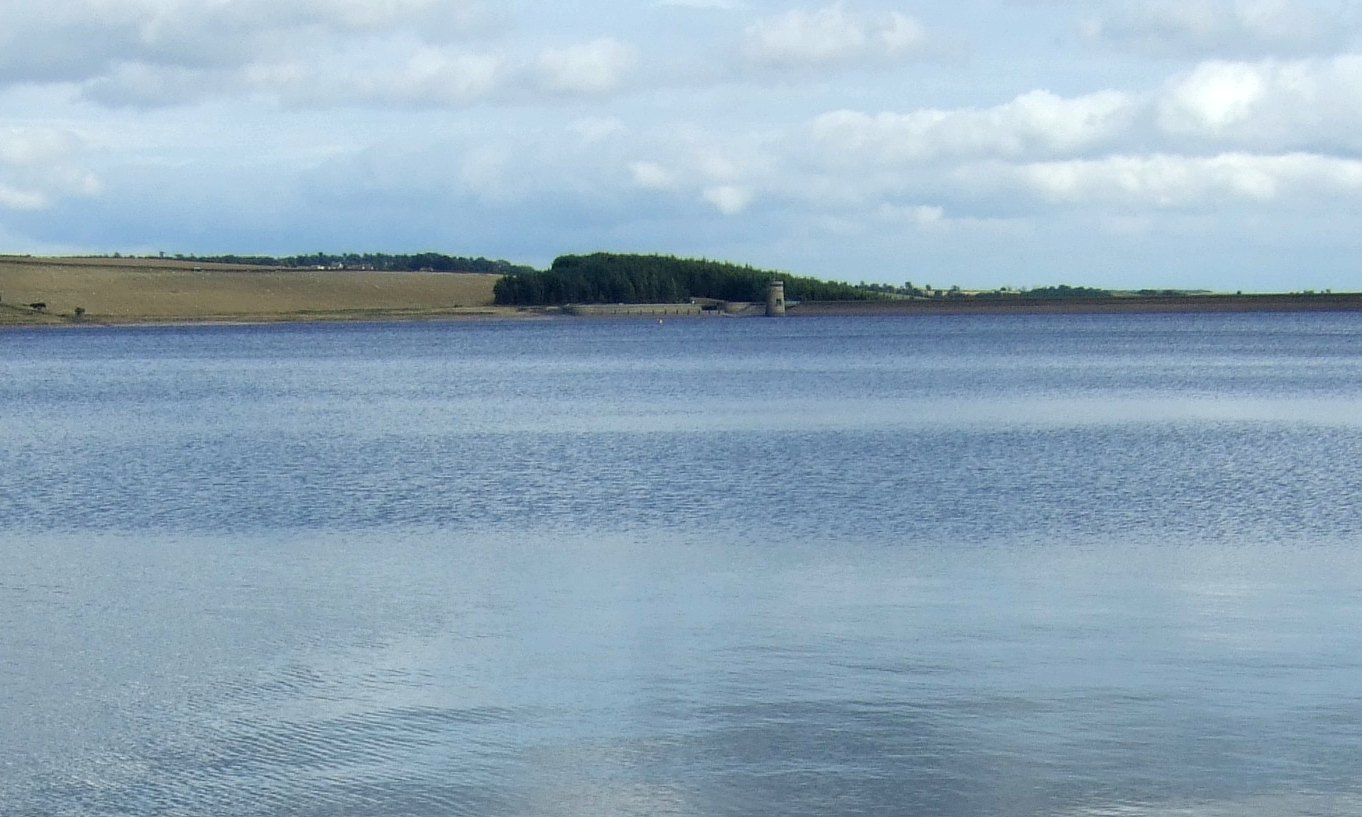
- Derwent Reservoir

- Location within North East England
- Location: County Durham / Northumberland
- Coordinates: 54°52′0″N 1°59′0″W
- Lake type: Reservoir
- Primary inflows: River Derwent
- Primary outflows: River Derwent
- Basin countries: United Kingdom

The Derwent Reservoir is a reservoir on the River Derwent, on the border between County Durham and Northumberland, in England. It is west of Consett. It is 3.5 miles (5.6 km) long) and covers an area of 4 km^{2} and has a maximum depth of 100 ft (30m) and when full, holds 11,000 million gallons (50,000,000m³).

The reservoir is a key part of the water supply network in north east England (which is owned and managed by Northumbrian Water). It is the principal water source for the Tyne and Wear metropolitan area, supplying 28,000,000 imperial gallons (130,000,000 L; 34,000,000 US gal) per day. The reservoir was first proposed in 1957 when the Sunderland and South Shields Water Company promoted the Derwent Water Order. Building work began on the reservoir in 1960, and it was opened in July 1967 by Princess Alexandra. Unlike other reservoirs in Northern England that are flooded valleys with a dam head, Derwent was dug out of the ground and the earth removed was used in its dam head.

The flow of the River Derwent can be supplemented, when necessary, by water transferred from the much larger Kielder Water in Northumberland. However, this connection cannot be used to increase the depth of the reservoir itself.

Sediment within the reservoir has been found to contain elevated levels of zinc, lead and cadmium. These have drained into the reservoir from areas of historic mining activity around Blanchland. Consequently, populations of macroscopic plants in the reservoir are relatively low.

Derwent Reservoir also hosts a sailing club, which holds many events throughout the year, including windsurfing, sailing, running and triathlons. The area around the reservoir hosts the annual Tour of the Reservoir cycle race.

The reservoir also has hydro electric plant installed, with a rating of 97 kilowatts.

== See also ==
- British Waterways
- List of reservoirs and dams in the United Kingdom
