= Consett =

Town in County Durham, England

Coordinates: 54.85°N 1.83°W

- Town
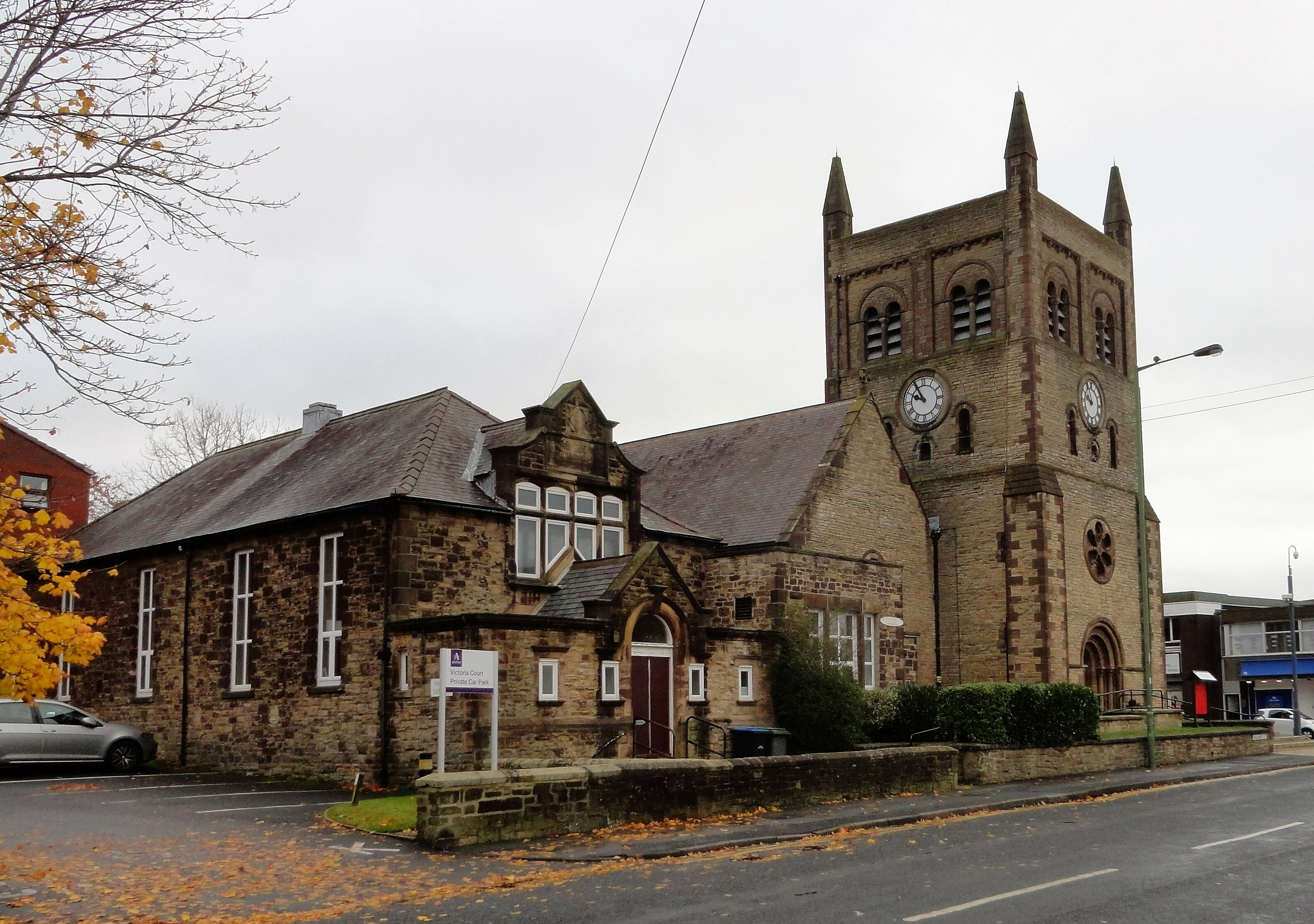
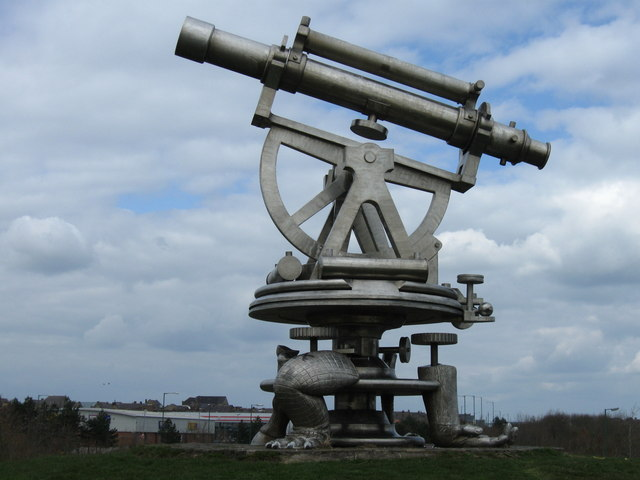
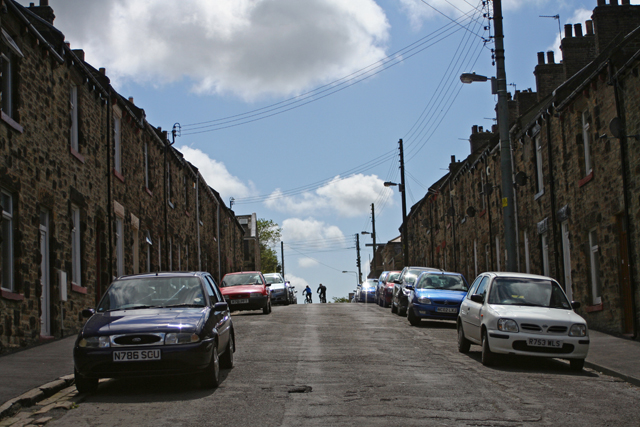
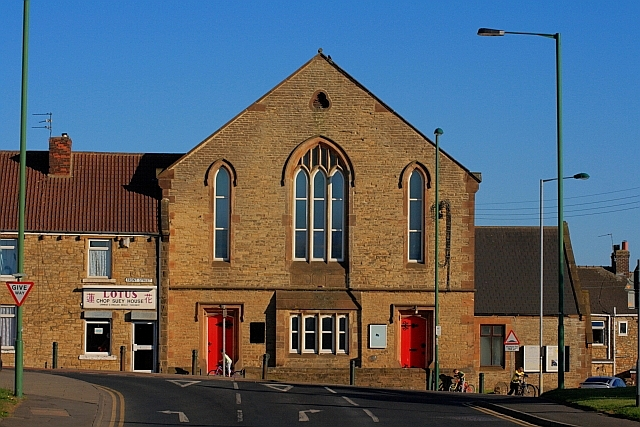
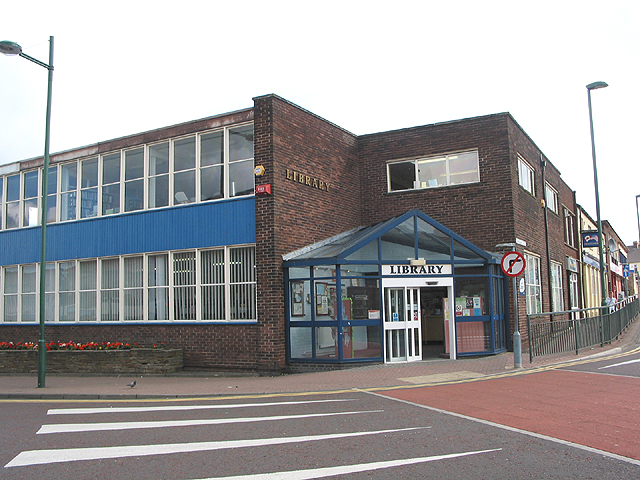
- Christ Church Terris Novalis Terraces of Consett Gospel Hall The Library

- Location within County Durham
- Population: 25,812
- OS grid reference: NZ108511
- Unitary authority: County Durham
- Ceremonial county: Durham
- Region: North East
- Country: England
- Sovereign state: United Kingdom
- Post town: CONSETT
- Postcode district: DH8
- Dialling code: 01207
- Police: Durham
- Fire: County Durham and Darlington
- Ambulance: North East
- UK Parliament: Blaydon and Consett

Consett is a town in the County Durham district, in the ceremonial county of Durham, England, about 14 miles (23 km) south-west of Newcastle upon Tyne. It had a population of 27,394 in 2001 and an estimate of 25,812 in 2019.

== History ==
Consett sits high on the edge of the Pennines. Its name originates in the Old English Cunecesheafod (heafod means headland, the meaning of cunec is less clear but is thought to derive from the Brittonic conyge or "hill"), first recorded in the 13th century. In 1841, it was a village community of only 145, but it was about to become a boom town: below the ground were coking coal and blackband iron ore, and nearby was limestone. These three ingredients were needed for blast furnaces to produce iron and steel.

The town is perched on the steep eastern bank of the River Derwent and owes its origins to industrial development arising from lead mining in the area, together with the development of the steel industry in the Derwent Valley, which is said to have been initiated by immigrant German cutlers and sword-makers from Solingen, who settled in the village of Shotley Bridge during the 17th century.

During the 17th and 18th centuries, the Derwent Valley was the cradle of the British steel industry, helped by the easy availability of coal in the area and the import of high quality iron ore from Sweden via the port of Newcastle upon Tyne. However, after the invention of the Bessemer process in the 19th century, steel could be made from British iron ore (hitherto too heavily contaminated by phosphorus) and the Derwent Valley's geographical advantage was lost, allowing Middlesbrough and Sheffield to become the leading centre of the British steel industry.

Consett railway station opened in 1896. It remained open for passengers until 1955 and mineral trains continued to pass through the site until 1980 on their way to the steelworks. In November 2020, the Department for Transport approved funding for an initial feasibility study into restoring a rail link to the town.

== Governance ==
Consett is part of the Blaydon and Consett parliament constituency. It was previously part of the North West Durham Parliamentary Constituency, last represented by Richard Holden of the Conservative Party following the 2019 general election. Since 2024 it is part of Blaydon and Consett Parliamentary Constituency, represented by Liz Twist. Before 1983, the town gave its name to its parliamentary constituency: Consett (UK Parliament constituency).

Consett was part of Derwentside District Council, which merged into the Durham County Council unitary authority on 1 April 2009. The Consett area is currently divided into four electoral divisions (Benfieldside; Consett North; Delves Lane and Consett South; and Leadgate and Medomsley), each electing two county councillors.

The town unlike most other towns and villages in County Durham is unparished and has no town council.

Consett was part of the constituency of North East England in the European Parliament until 2020.

== Geography ==
Consett sits above the rural Derwent valley near the boundary of County Durham and Northumberland. The Derwent Reservoir just west of the town makes a popular leisure attraction and beauty spot.

At about 900 ft (270 metres) above sea level, Consett is the third highest market town in England and one of the highest towns in the United Kingdom. This makes Consett typically at least 2 °C colder than nearby cities such as Durham and Newcastle, and more prone to frost, ice and snow in the winter months.

Consett has amenities such as shops, pubs and night clubs that also serve several villages in its immediate surroundings, some such as Shotley Bridge and Blackhill contiguous and some not, for example Moorside and Castleside.

== Economy ==
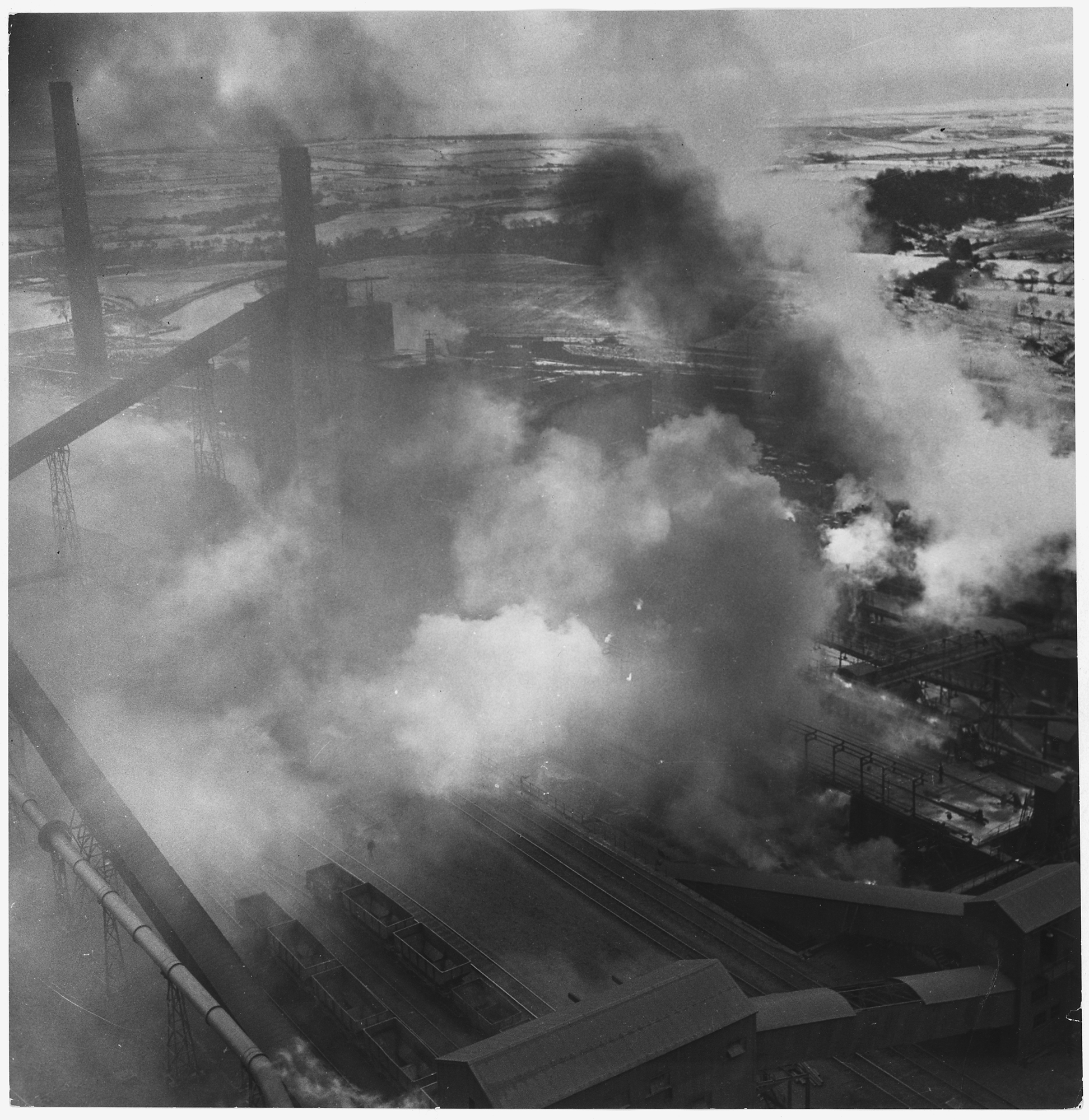
Consett steel works seen in the 1940s or 50s.

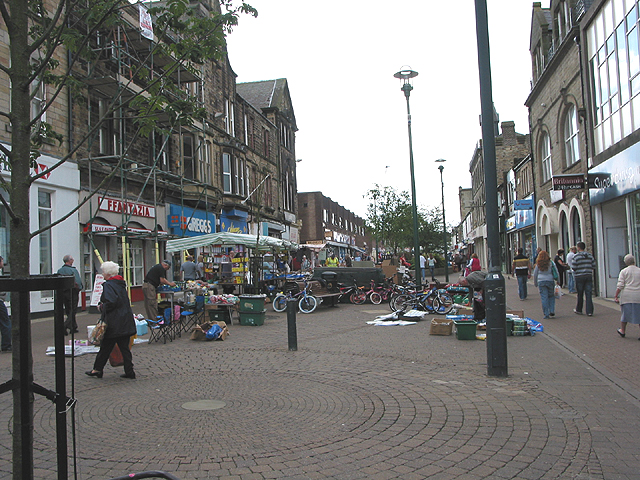
Middle Street, Consett

The Consett Iron Company was established in 1864 as a successor to the original Derwent Iron Company of 1840, when the first blast furnaces were introduced. Over the next 100 years, Consett became one of the world's most prominent steel-making towns, manufacturing the steel for Blackpool Tower and some of the UK's nuclear submarines.

Steel dominated Consett's economy for 140 years, with the steelworks' tall cooling towers and other large plant looming over rows of terraced houses. During the iron and steel era a pall of red dust hung over the town, consisting of airborne iron oxide from the steel-making plant. At its peak in the 1960s, the Consett steel works employed 6,000 workers. It was nationalised to become part of the large British Steel Corporation. Although there was intense competition in the 1970s from British firms and from abroad, Consett steelworks remained relatively successful and still profitable even in the year it closed. As the rolling mills were closed in the 1970s, despite local opposition, there were discussions over the future of the plant as a whole.

=== Steelworks closure ===
Consett steelworks had always avoided closure, even in difficult economic times, but in 1980 it was closed with the loss of 3,700 jobs and many more from the knock-on effects in ancillary industries. The unemployment rate in Consett became double the national average. A major plan to restructure steel-making in the UK saw light in the mid-1970s, based on concentrating it in five UK coastal locations, to allow easy import of raw materials and export of finished goods. BSC Consett was not one of the locations, despite being serviced by a well-established rail network, producing high-quality boron steel and being in profit in 1980, the year it was closed.

A deputation of steelworkers lobbied the government in London. The social impact of the decision was often characterised by many of the local people at the time as "The Murder of a Town". After closure of the steel works the town became one of the worst unemployment black spots in Britain. In 1981, it peaked at 36 per cent – one of the worst unemployment rates of any town in the United Kingdom and around three times the national average at the time. The closure marked the end of the Derwent Valley steel heritage, and the decline of Consett as an industrial town. Along with the closure of coal mines, it was also a first step in the decline of all heavy industry in the Derwent Valley.

The last steel ingot from the Consett ironworks was made into a cross and is kept at St Mary's Roman Catholic Church, Blackhill.

=== Regeneration ===
Regeneration in the 1990s, through Project Genesis, went only some way towards repairing the damage done to the local economy by these closures. Unemployment came down to the national average, but this was partly due to outward migration and economic inactivity due to long-term illness, neither of which were included in the government statistics. In 2011 Durham County Council, which provides a lot of employment for local people, commenced a three-year plan to reduce its workforce by 1600.

Alongside the public sector, small and medium-sized businesses now provide jobs in the area. The Phileas Fogg Company (County Durham), with its factory in Consett, were mildly famous for a few years from 1988 for their snack food "Made in Medomsley Road, Consett" television adverts. It is now owned by KP Snacks (originally part of United Biscuits). The Explorer Group, based in Consett, is the United Kingdom's second-largest manufacturer of caravans. Elddis Transport Limited is based in the town.

Since 2000, there have been several new housing developments on the former steelworks site and surrounding areas. Derwentside College, formerly sited at Park Road, moved to a new campus at Berry Edge in September 2002 and more recently, major retailers have moved in and the site which once made steel for Blackpool Tower and Britain's nuclear submarines is now home to rival Tesco and Morrisons stores, a string of high street outlets and fast food restaurants.

New industrial units are also to be built on the former steel works site, after the Project Genesis Trust secured investment of £358,968 from the Rural Growth Network (RGN) to develop bespoke business premises and offices on part of the site. (The Project Genesis Trust is a body created to regenerate the former steelworks site).

The population soared to 39,000, higher than in the days of steel, and unemployment plummeted. In August 2015, only 420 people were receiving Jobseekers' Allowance, with an official unemployment rate of 1.7 per cent, markedly lower than the rest of County Durham. The wider claimant count of people on out-of-work benefits was 6.3 per cent, half the County Durham average, although it omits those receiving disability benefits, which will be a significant number, given the town's industrial legacy.

A large area formerly used by Shotley Bridge Hospital was sold to a property developer, which began to build a further 400 homes in 2013–2014. This development has now become the multi-award-winning Woodlands Estate. This has further aided Consett's recovery as a top commuter town due to its convenient location between Durham and Newcastle.

Along with the housing developments of the last few years (some still ongoing), there has also been major investment in local amenities, such as a £44-million sports complex in Medomsley Road, near the old sports facilities. This is shared with Consett Academy, which was given a brand new £5.7 million building.

In June 2020, the MP for North West Durham, Richard Holden, sponsored a bid to the Ideas Fund of the Department for Transport's Restoring Your Railway Fund, hoping to access up to £50,000 to cover the cost of an initial study into the feasibility of restoring a rail link between Consett and Blaydon. In November 2020 it was announced that the requested funds would be provided for such a study into reinstating a rail service between Consett and Newcastle, although it was unclear where the Consett terminus of such a rail link would be located and whether this study would focus on the former Derwent Valley Railway or also include the former route via Birtley.

== Education ==
Consett's secondary school is Consett Academy. However, near to Consett in Lanchester is St Bede's Catholic School and Sixth Form College and in Stanley North Durham Academy, which along with Consett Academy is part of the New College Durham Academies Trust (NCDAT) managed by New College Durham.

== Culture ==
Consett is home to the Empire Theatre, one of County Durham's oldest theatres. Refurbished in 2020, it stages variety acts, plays and a Christmas pantomime. It also screens films at times when there are no live performances.

=== Belle Vue Leisure Centre ===
The Belle Vue Leisure Centre, including a gym, swimming pool, five-a-side football, tennis and babminton courts is situated on Medomsley Road.

=== Other entertainment venues ===
There are several well known pubs in Consett town centre including The Turf (which periodically hosts live music, also called Turfed Oot Café), The Fountain, Bellamy's, The Black Horse, The Traveller's Rest, The Duke of Wellington and the real ale pub, The Grey Horse, the latter of which hosts the Consett Ale Works microbrewery. Additionally, The Company Row, a Wetherspoons pub, sits on the junction of Victoria Road and Front Street.

Also well known is Consett's Steel Club north of the bus station.

=== Salvation Army Band ===
Consett was the first in the world to have a Salvation Army Corps Band, formed in December 1879 to play on the streets at Christmas. The original four musicians were Edward Lennox and his bandsmen George Storey, James Simpson and Robert Greenwood.

== Transport ==
Buses are run by Go Ahead's, Go North East subsidiary.

== Notable people ==
Alphabetical order within sections

=== Arts ===
- Sheila Mackie (1928–2010), artist

=== Business ===
- Rod Allen (1929–2007), advertising executive born in Consett
- Deryck Maughan (born 1947), chairman of Salomon Brothers and vice-chairman of the New York Stock Exchange was born in Consett.
- Bob Murray (born 1946), kitchen and bathroom magnate and former chairman of Sunderland AFC

=== Church ===
- Christopher Lowson (born 1953), Anglican Bishop of Lincoln

=== Music ===
- Ruth Copeland (born c. 1946), singer-songwriter, wrote songs for the soul star George Clinton.
- Graeme Danby (born 1962), opera singer born in the town,
- Janet Graham (born 1948), composer and music therapist
- Karen Harding (born 1991), singer born in Consett
- Mitch Laddie (born 1990), blues guitarist, vocalist and songwriter
- Freddie 'Fingers' Lee (1937–2014) singer, guitarist and pianist
- Susan Maughan (born 1938), singer, who reached No. 3 in the UK Singles Chart in 1962 with Bobby's Girl
- Paddy McAloon (born 1957), founding member of the band Prefab Sprout.
- Keith Strachan (born 1944 in Consett), composer and musical theatre director
- Steve Thompson (born 1952), musician, songwriter and record producer born in Consett

=== Performance ===
- Alun Armstrong (born 1946), actor, attended Consett Grammar School.
- Rowan Atkinson, (born 1955), starred in the Blackadder and Mr. Bean comedy series. Atkinson was born to Eric Atkinson and Ella May, Anglican farmers in Consett.
- Rebecca Calder (born 1981), actress
- Lee Ridley (born 1980), comedian and winner of Britain's Got Talent 2018 as "Lost Voice Guy"
- Denise Welch (born 1958), actress in Coronation Street, Soldier Soldier and Waterloo Road
- Mak Wilson (born 1957), puppeteer

=== Politics ===
- Alan Campbell (born 1957), Labour MP for Tynemouth and former Home Office Minister for Crime Reduction and Government Whip, was born in the town.
- Peter Dunphy (born in Consett in 1966) Chief Commoner of the City of London
- Darren Grimes (born 1993), political commentator and politician
- Mark Hewitson (1897–1973), trade union official and Labour MP
- George John Smith (1862–1946), three times elected MP for Christchurch, New Zealand, was born in Consett.

=== Sports ===
- Harry Ashby (1946–2010), professional golfer.
- Arthur Bellamy (1942–2014), professional footballer with Burnley and Chesterfield
- Mark Clattenburg (born 1975), professional football referee
- Frank Clark (born 1943), footballer and football manager, played for Newcastle United in their Inter-Cities Fairs Cup-winning team in 1968–1969, then for Nottingham Forest under Brian Clough and Peter Taylor, winning a European Cup winner's medal in 1979. He is Vice Chair of the League Managers' Association.
- Paul Collingwood (born 1976), England and Durham cricketer, born in Shotley Bridge
- Jonathan Hawkins (1983–2025), chess grandmaster
- John Herdman (born 1975), head coach of the New Zealand women's national football team (2006–2011), Canada women's national soccer team (2011–2018), Canada men's national soccer team (2018–2023) and Toronto FC (2023–2024)
- Colin Hutchinson (1936–2017), professional footballer born in Consett
- Russell Inglis (1936–1982), first-class cricketer for Durham County Cricket Club, born in Consett
- Joe Joyce (born 1961), professional footballer, currently Academy Manager at Newcastle United
- Michael Kay (born 1989), footballer for Tranmere Rovers
- Joe Loughran (1915–1994), footballer for Birmingham City F.C., Luton Town F.C. etc., born in Consett
- Bobby Lumley (1933–2017), footballer for Charlton Athletic F.C., Hartlepool United F.C. etc., born in Consett
- Jackie Maltby (born 1939), professional footballer born in Consett
- Kevin McCurley (1926–2000), professional footballer born in Consett
- Paul McNally (born 1949), professional footballer born in Consett
- Keith Morton (1934-2021), professional footballer born in Consett
- Bev Priestman (born 1986), coach of Canada women's national soccer team (2020–2024), led them to the gold medal at the 2020 Summer Olympics
- John Robson (1950–2004), professional footballer for Derby County and Aston Villa
- Jimmy Seed (born Blackhill, 1895–1966), professional footballer at Sunderland, Tottenham Hotspur and Sheffield Wednesday, then manager of Charlton Athletic and Millwall
- John Stirk (born 1955), professional footballer born in Consett
- Mathew Tait (born 1986), England international and ex Newcastle Falcons Rugby Union player, born in Shotley Bridge and brought up in nearby Wolsingham
- Barry Venison (born 1964), retired footballer and pundit
