= Henri (disambiguation) =

Henri is a French given name.

Henri may also refer to:

- Henri (2013 film), a Franco-Belgian drama
- Henri, le Chat Noir, a 2007 film
- Henri (ship), a brig wrecked in 1852
- Henri (surname), a surname
- List of storms named Henri
- Henri, a stage name of François-Louis Henry (1786–1855), French baritone

== See also ==
- Henry (disambiguation)
