= Fitzroy Bay (New Zealand) =

Bay in New Zealand

Coordinates: 41°23′30″S 174°52′30″E

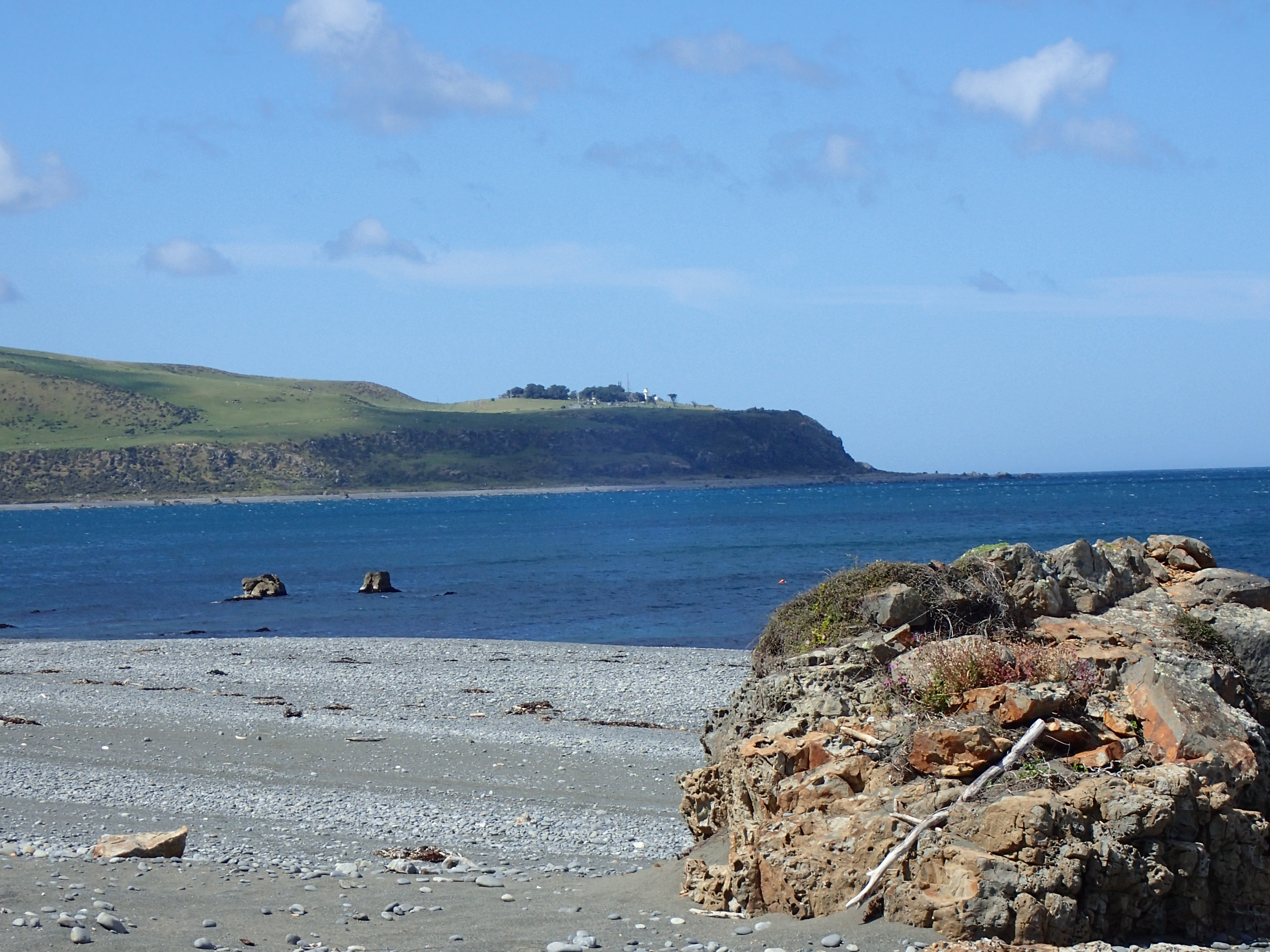
Fitzroy Bay, with Baring Head in the distance

Fitzroy Bay is a bay close to the entrance of Wellington Harbour in New Zealand. It lies to the southeast of the entrance to the harbour, between Pencarrow Head (to the north) and Baring Head (to the south). Lake Kohangatera drains into the bay through Gollans Stream.

The bay has been the site of several shipwrecks, predominantly caused by the strong winds and swells which run through Cook Strait. They include Matilda in 1848, Henry in 1852, Port Glasgow in 1858, Affiance in 1867, Halcione in 1896 and Paiaka in 1906.

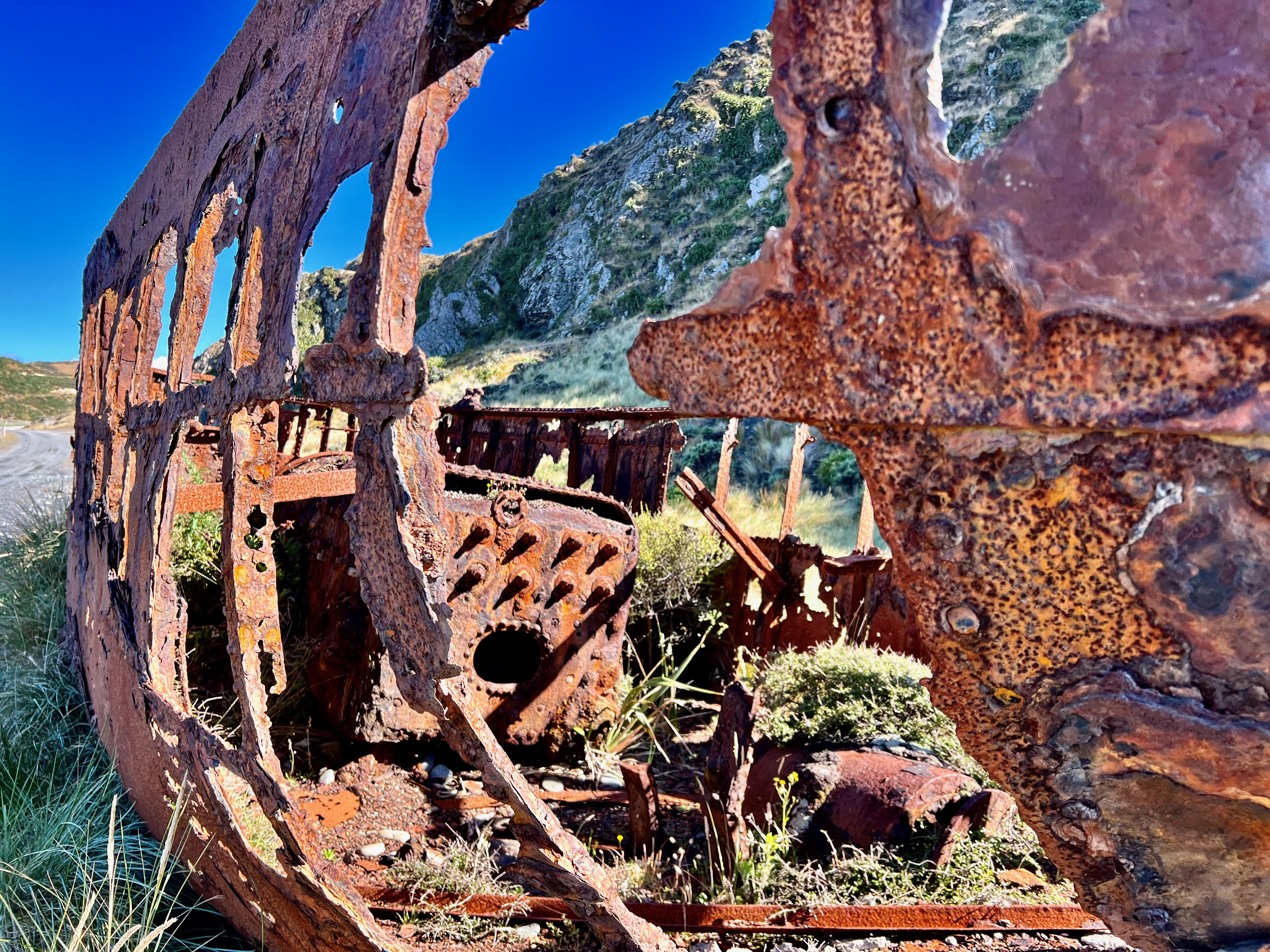
SS Paiaka was wrecked in Fitzroy Bay in 1906 and dug out of the sand in 1987. She now lies beside the cycle/walk track to Baring Head

The rusty remains of the Paiaka are now beside the track at the north end of Fitzroy Bay. They were placed there by the Eastbourne Historical Society in 1987. The earliest mention of the steamer seems to have been when she was offered for sale at Evans' Bay as the Perfect Cure in 1878. She then had 3/8 in (9.5 mm) iron plates, was 36 ft (11 m) long, 8 1/2 ft (2.6 m). wide, 5 1/2 ft (1.7 m) deep, with 8 hp (6.0 kW) high-pressure, double-cylinder engines, a 3-bladed 3 1/6 ft (0.97 m) diameter screw, able to make up to 7 kn (13 km/h; 8.1 mph). In 1881 she was lengthened by 12 ft (3.7 m) for Samuel Brown, a Foxton sawmill owner, who had her rebuilt by David Robertson and Co., of Wellington's Phoenix Foundry, with new engines and boilers (tested up to 150 psi (1,000 kPa)). She was then the smallest steamer registered In Wellington, and cleared Customs for Foxton as an iron screw steamer of 14 tons gross, 10 tons net, 46.7 ft (14.2 m) long and 8.7 ft (2.7 m) beam. In 1882 Paiaka was listed as a new 9 hp (6.7 kW) compound screw, extended river steamer. However, she proved unsuitable for the Manawatū River trade, so on 24 July 1886 she arrived back in Wellington as a tug from Foxton, with plans to use her as an excursion vessel. She did a few small jobs, but spent most of her time laid up. By 1896 she was a trawler. In 1905 she was listed as a 10-ton 10 hp (7.5 kW) non condensing screw river steamer. She was still being used a trawler in the Sounds in 1906, when her owner, Edward Seager, decided she should go to Wellington to be laid up. She was then ketch rigged and in ballast, but stranded at Fitzroy Bay on 9 July 1906 after her cable parted, and she couldn't steam against the heavy sea and N.N.W. hurricane. Her crew of 2 survived. Her owner later pleaded guilty to putting Paiaka to sea without a certificate of survey and received a small fine.
