= List of shipwrecks in November 1867 =

The list of shipwrecks in November 1867 includes ships sunk, foundered, grounded, or otherwise lost during November 1867.

== 1 November ==
List of shipwrecks: 1 November 1867
Ship	State	Description
Annie	United Kingdom	The ship was wrecked at Delgada Point, São Miguel Island, Azores with the loss of two of her crew.
Arabella	United Kingdom	The ship was driven onto the Panxiha Rocks, São Miguel Island and was wrecked. Her crew were rescued.
Arabia	United Kingdom	The ship was driven ashore in the Hooghly River in a typhoon.
Choice	United Kingdom	The smack foundered at the mouth of the Lymington River. Her three crew were rescued by the pilot cutter Blonde (United Kingdom).
Delhi	India	The steamship sank in a typhoon at Calcutta.
Delphine Melanie	United Kingdom	The ship was severely damaged in a typhoon at Calcutta.
Deodata	Norway	The ship was driven ashore and wrecked at Thisted, Denmark. Her crew were rescued. She was on a voyage from Grimsby, Lincolnshire, United Kingdom to Tønsberg.
Euphrates	United Kingdom	The ship was driven ashore and damaged in a typhoon at Calcutta. She was refloated.
Flower of the Forest	United Kingdom	The ship was severely damaged in a typhoon at Calcutta.
Furness Abbey	United Kingdom	The steamship was wrecked in a typhoon at Calcutta.
Howrah	United Kingdom	The tender was driven ashore in a typhoon at Calcutta.
Hussey's Pack	United Kingdom	The smack collided with the smack Clara (United Kingdom) south of the Dogger Bank. She consequently foundered in the North Sea off the Dowsing Lightship ( Trinity House) the next day. Her crew were rescued.
Independent	United Kingdom	The ship struck a rock at "Lynloer", Norway and was damaged. She was on a voyage from Kronstadt, Russia to Grangemouth, Stirlingshire.
Jadel Curreen	India	The ship was driven ashore in the Hooghly River in a typhoon.
John Barrett	United Kingdom	The yawl struck "Shierkey Island" and sank. Her crew were rescued. She was on a voyage from the Isles of Scilly to the Kenmare River. She was later raised and repaired.
Mary Ann	United Kingdom	The ship was driven ashore and severely damaged in a typhoon at Calcutta.
Mary Blake	United Kingdom	The ship was wrecked at Delgada Point with the loss of a crew member.
Mercury	United Kingdom	The tug sank at Calcutta.
Michael Angelo	United Kingdom	The ship disappeared in a typhoon at Saugor, India, either blown out to sea or foundered.
Mille Tonies	France	The ship was severely damaged in a typhoon at Calcutta.
Morayshire	United Kingdom	The ship was driven ashore on Tiger Island (east of Saugor Island) in a typhoon. She came to rest in a creek 4 nautical miles (7.4 km) inland. The wreck was discovered in August 1869.
Nile	United Kingdom	The ship was driven into India and Queen of the Mersey (both United Kingdom) in a typhoon at Calcutta and was severely damaged.
Orissa	United Kingdom	The steamship was driven ashore and wrecked in a typhoon at Calcutta. She was later refloated.
Queen of the Mersey	United Kingdom	The ship was driven ashore in a typhoon at Calcutta.
Release	United Kingdom	The ship was driven ashore and wrecked on São Miguel Island. Her crew were rescued.
Sarah and Emma	United Kingdom	The ship was damaged in a typhoon at Calcutta.
Sestos	United Kingdom	The tug was driven ashore in a typhoon at Bagbazar, India.
Shooting Star	United Kingdom	The barque was run into in The Downs and was then driven ashore on the Kent coast. She was refloated and taken in to London.
Sterling	United Kingdom	The barque ran aground in the Hooghly River in a typhoon. She was refloated.
Storm King	United Kingdom	The ship was severely damaged in a typhoon at Calcutta.
St. Lawrence	United Kingdom	The ship was damaged in a typhoon at Calcutta.
St. Philbert	France	The ship was severely damaged in a typhoon at Calcutta.
Thunder	United Kingdom	The steamship was reported to have foundered off the Eastern Channel Lightship (India) with the loss of all hands. She was on a voyage from Penang, Straits Settlements to Calcutta, India. In August 1869, it was discovered that she had been driven ashore in a creek on Tiger Island at a location more than 4 nautical miles (7.4 km) inland.
Underley	United Kingdom	The ship was damaged in a typhoon at Calcutta. She was placed under repair.
Unnamed	United Kingdom	The steamship foundered off Cossipore, India in a typhoon.
Unnamed	United Kingdom	The fishing smack was run down and sunk off Dublin by the steamship Vartry (United Kingdom) with the loss of four of her seven crew.

== 2 November ==
List of shipwrecks: 2 November 1867
Ship	State	Description
Elizabeth	(United Kingdom of Great Britain and Ireland) New Zealand	schooner grounded and was wrecked on the bar at Hokitika while being towed into port.
Jane	United Kingdom	The barque was driven ashore on "Lansholm". She was on a voyage from Newcastle upon Tyne, Northumberland to Stockholm, Sweden. She was refloated on 4 November and resumed her voyage.
Picture	United Kingdom	The ship was sighted whilst on a voyage from Liverpool, Lancashire to Bombay, India. No further trace, presumed foundered with the loss of all hands.
Spring	United Kingdom	The brig ran aground and sank about 8 nautical miles (15 km) off Zuydcoote, Nord, France. Her crew were rescued by the Dunkerque Lifeboat. She was on a voyage from Whitby, Yorkshire to Dunkirk, Nord.

== 3 November ==
List of shipwrecks: 3 November 1867
Ship	State	Description
Anna Dorothea	United Kingdom	The ship was wrecked on "Harbuck Island". Her crew survived. She was on a voyage from Vancouver Island, British Columbia to Geelong, Victoria.
Jessica	United Kingdom	The ship was driven ashore at Galveston, Texas, United States. She was consequently condemned.
Scottish Lass, or Scottish Maid	United Kingdom	The ship struck a sunken wreck and sank off the Goodwin Sands, Kent. Her crew survived. She was on a voyage from Sunderland, County Durham to Gravelines, Nord, France.

== 4 November ==
List of shipwrecks: 4 November 1867
Ship	State	Description
Astoria	Norway	The ship was wrecked on the Agger Sand, in the North Sea off the coast of Denmark. Her crew were rescued. She was on a voyage from London, United Kingdom to Arendal.
Beeswing	United Kingdom	The ship was driven ashore at Dieppe, Seine-Inférieure, France. She was on a voyage from Sunderland, County Durham to Le Tréport, Seine-Inférieure.
Demetrius	United Kingdom	The brig collided with the steamship Stockton (United Kingdom) and sank in the Helvoet Canal. She was on a voyage from Sunderland to Schiedam, South Holland, Netherlands.
Deux Sœurs	France	The lugger foundered off Ouessant, Finistère. Her crew were rescued by Malfiltre (France). Deux Sœeurs was on a voyage from Llanelly, Glamorgan, United Kingdom to Nantes, Loire-Inférieure.
Elaine	Prussia	The ship was wrecked on the Robben Sand with the loss of all hands. she was on a voyage from Newcastle upon Tyne, Northumberland, United Kingdom to Husum.
Ellen	United Kingdom	The barque was destroyed by fire 25 nautical miles (46 km) off Heligoland. Her crew were rescued. She was on a voyage from Hartlepool, County Durham to Hamburg.
Kathleen	United Kingdom	The brig was abandoned 15 nautical miles (28 km) off Beachy Head, Sussex. Her crew were rescued by the smack Dream (United Kingdom). Kathleen was on a voyage from Hartlepool to Fécamp, Seine-Inférieure, France.
Paragon	United Kingdom	The brig sank off the Stroombank, in the North Sea off the cost of West Flanders, Belgium. Her crew were rescued. She was on a voyage from Sunderland, County Durham to Ostend, West Flanders.
Volunteer	United Kingdom	The brig was driven ashore and wrecked at Ostend. Her crew were rescued. She was on a voyage from Sunderland to Ostend.
Unnamed	Flag unknown	The galiot was wrecked on the Rottensand, in the North Sea with the loss of all four crew.

== 5 November ==
List of shipwrecks: 5 November 1867
Ship	State	Description
Brodres Haab	Norway	The ship capsized in the North Sea 100 nautical miles (190 km) west of Heligoland. Six of her ten crew were rescued by the steamship British Queen (United Kingdom), the others were reported missing.
Cæsar	United Kingdom	The ship foundered in the North Sea. Her crew were rescued by Adelaide (United Kingdom). Cæsar was on a voyage from Newcastle upon Tyne, Northumberland to Cartagena, Spain.
Catharina	Netherlands	The ship was lost near Wadsoe, Norway.
Corunna	United Kingdom	The brig was abandoned in the North Sea. She was on a voyage from Vyborg, Grand Duchy of Finland to Leith, Lothian. Corunna was discovered in a derelict condition on 12 November and taken in to Bremen.
Frithjof	Norway	The ship was driven ashore near Fredrikshavn, Denmark. She was on a voyage from Newry, County Antrim, United Kingdom to Arendal.
Ripple	United Kingdom	The collier, a schooner, sank at Altenbruch. Her crew were rescued. She was on a voyage from Middlesbrough, Yorkshire to Hamburg.
Zwei Gebrueder	Grand Duchy of Oldenburg	The ship was driven ashore at Tversted, Denmark. She was on a voyage from Sunderland, County Durham to Ystad, Sweden.

== 6 November ==
List of shipwrecks: 6 November 1867
Ship	State	Description
Alma, and Eskmok	France; United Kingdom	The ships collided in the Atlantic Ocean and both foundered. Alma lost a crew member. She was on a voyage from Callao, Peru to Havre de Grâce, Seine-Inférieure. Eskmok was on a voyage from Liverpool, Lancashire to Calcutta, India. Forty-five survivors were rescued by the schooner Pavadetta (Netherlands).
Aln	United Kingdom	The ship was driven ashore and wrecked near Oostmahorn, Friesland, Netherlands. She was on a voyage from Saint Petersburg, Russia to Dundee, Forfarshire.
Empire	United Kingdom	The ship was abandoned 40 nautical miles (74 km) north east of the Bird Rocks, Newfoundland Colony. Her crew were rescued by the full-rigged ship Chevalier (United Kingdom). Empire was later driven ashore at Cape Anguille, Newfoundland Colony.
Isabella Woodhouse	United Kingdom	The ship struck a rock and capsized at Alexandria, Egypt. She was on a voyage from Newcastle upon Tyne, Northumberland to Alexandria.
Margaretha Tammen	Prussia	The ship was driven ashore at Norden. Her crew were rescued.
Zwei Gebrueder	Prussia	The ship was driven ashore at Norden. She was on a voyage from Sunderland, County Durham, United Kingdom to Ystad, Sweden. She was consequently condemned.

== 7 November ==
List of shipwrecks: 7 November 1867
Ship	State	Description
Batavier	United Kingdom	The steamship ran aground at Dordrecht, South Holland, Netherlands. She had been refloated by 9 November and resumed her voyage.
Corsair	United Kingdom	The paddle tug was wrecked on the Cat Craig Rocks, on the coast of Lothian. Her crew were rescued. She was on a voyage from Leith, Lothian to Sunderland, County Durham.
Mary Ann White	(United Kingdom of Great Britain and Ireland) New Zealand	The 14-ton schooner grounded and was wrecked on Rangitoto Reef in the Hauraki Gulf.
Piet Hein	Netherlands	The ship ran aground on the Bornkumkum Reef. She was on a voyage from Newcastle upon Tyne, Northumberland, United Kingdom to the city of Groningen. She was refloated and towed in to Delfzijl, Groningen.
Rotterdam	United Kingdom	The steamship ran aground at Dordrecht.
Stork	United Kingdom	The schooner was wrecked off Faial Island, Azores. Her crew were rescued.
Unnamed	United Kingdom	The brig foundered off Juist, Prussia with the loss of all ten crew.

== 8 November ==
List of shipwrecks: 8 November 1867
Ship	State	Description
Affiance	(United Kingdom of Great Britain and Ireland) New South Wales	The 374-ton barque hit rocks close to Kapiti Island on 5 November while en route from Newcastle, New South Wales to Lyttelton. The barque was damaged sufficiently that the captain decided to put into Wellington Harbour. By this stage, the ship was taking on considerable water, and the pumps could not keep up. She was steered ashore at Fitzroy Bay, just south of the harbour entrance, to prevent loss of life.
Alice, and Princess Alice	United Kingdom	The steamship Alice collided with the paddle steamer Princess Alice and was beached on the Muscle Scarp. She was on a voyage from Newcastle upon Tyne, Northumberland to Grangemouth, Stirlingshire. She was refloated with assistance from a tug and towed in to Newcastle upon Tyne. Princess Alice was beached at North Shields, Northumberland. Her 30 passengers were taken off. She was on a voyage from Newcastle upon Tyne to Aberdeen.
Belle New	United Kingdom	The ship was wrecked off the mouth of the Eider with the loss of all but one of her crew. She was on a voyage from Aberdeen to Harburg.
Benbow	United Kingdom	The steamship ran aground on the Maplin Sand, in the North Sea off the coast of Essex. She was on a voyage from Dunkirk, Nord, France to London. She was refloated the next day and resumed her voyage.
Flying Cloud	(United Kingdom of Great Britain and Ireland) New Zealand	The schooner went ashore during a storm at the mouth of the Grey River.
Hvidsteen	Norway	The ship was wrecked near "Glossendorf", Prussia. She was on a voyage from Holmstad to London.
Industry	United Kingdom	The schooner was driven ashore and sank at Findhorn, Moray. She was on a voyage from Sunderland, County Durham to Findhorn.
Martha Alida	United Kingdom	The ship was driven ashore at Hamra, Gotland, Sweden. She was on a voyage from Saint Petersburg, Russia to London. Martha Alida was driven out to sea on 10 November. Her crew were rescued. She was subsequently towed into "Enerik" by a steamship. Found to be severely damaged, she was condemned.
William West	United Kingdom	The ship ran aground on the Mouse Sand and sank. She was on a voyage from Par, Cornwall to Runcorn, Cheshire. She was refloated on 12 November and beached at Cemlyn, Anglesey.

== 9 November ==
List of shipwrecks: 9 November 1867
Ship	State	Description
Caid	France	The ship foundered in the Mediterranean Sea. She was on a voyage from Varna, Ottoman Empire to Marseille, Bouches-du-Rhône.
Ceres	Rostock	The ship was wrecked on Bornholm, Denmark. She was on a voyage from Kronstadt, Russia to Hull, Yorkshire, United Kingdom.
Cymraes	(United Kingdom of Great Britain and Ireland) New Zealand	The 28-ton schooner parted her cable during a storm and was wrecked at the mouth of the Grey River.
Gazelle	Norway	The brig was driven ashore and wrecked at Furreby, Denmark. She was on a voyage from Middlesbrough, Yorkshire to Aarhus, Denmark.
Gesina	Netherlands	The ship was driven ashore on Schiermonnikoog, Friesland. Her crew were rescued. She was on a voyage from Ipswich, Suffolk, United Kingdom to Groningen.
Hendrika	Netherlands	The ship was driven ashore on Ameland, Friesland. Her crew were rescued. She was on a voyage from Newcastle upon Tyne, Northumberland, United Kingdom to Groningen.
Mary Hall	United Kingdom	The ship ran aground. She was on a voyage from Kronstadt, Russia to London. She was refloated and put in to Copenhagen, Denmark in a leaky condition.
Patriot	Norway	The ship was wrecked on Bornholm. She was on a voyage from Sweden to Scotland.

== 10 November ==
List of shipwrecks: 10 November 1867
Ship	State	Description
Baltic	United Kingdom	The ship was driven ashore at Danzig. Her crew were rescued.
Ellen	United Kingdom	The ship was abandoned in the Baltic Sea 40 nautical miles (74 km) off Danzig. Her crew were rescued. She was on a voyage from Gävle, Sweden to Hartlepool, County Durham. Ellen subsequently came ashore at Hela, Prussia.
Euphemia	United Kingdom	The ship was abandoned in the North Sea off the coast of Aberdeenshire, Her crew were presumed to have drowned, the ship's boat washed ashore at Fraserburgh, Aberdeenshire. She was on a voyage from Sunderland, County Durham to Burghead, Aberdeenshire. She was taken in to Aberdeen by the Coast Guard.
Gesine	Flag unknown	The ship was driven ashore dear Domesnes. She was on a voyage from Riga, Russia to London, United Kingdom. She had become a wreck by 23 November.
Hannah Salvesen	Sweden	The ship was driven ashore at Danzig. She was on a voyage from "Tystadt" to "Lundgren".
Harrison	United Kingdom	The ship was driven ashore at Danzig. Her crew were rescued.
Hermon	Sweden	The ship was driven ashore at Danzig.
Jane and Ann	United Kingdom	The ship was driven ashore at Danzig. She was on a voyage from a Swedish port to Visby, Sweden.
Johan Wilhelm	Sweden	The ship was lost near Ringkøbing, Denmark. She was on a voyage from Middlesbrough, Yorkshire, United Kingdom to Gothenburg.
Majestic	United Kingdom	The schooner sprang a leak and was beached at Gibraltar. She was on a voyage from Marseille, Bouches-du-Rhône, France to London.
Maria	Norway	The ship was driven ashore at Danzig. She was on a voyage from Drontheim to Bruges, West Flanders, Belgium.
Messina	United Kingdom	The ship was driven ashore at Danzig. Her crew were rescued.
Neptune	France	The fishing boat was lost in the North Sea. Her crew were rescued by the smack Corsair (United Kingdom).
Niord	Flag unknown	The ship was driven ashore at Danzig.
Victoria	United Kingdom	The brig was driven ashore and wrecked between Leba and Stolpemünde, Prussia. Her crew were rescued.
William	(United Kingdom of Great Britain and Ireland) Jersey	The brig was driven ashore near Swanage, Dorset. She was on a voyage from Jersey to Dartmouth, Devon.

== 11 November ==
List of shipwrecks: 11 November 1867
Ship	State	Description
Addy	United Kingdom	The schooner was driven ashore and wrecked on Fårö, Sweden.
Ann Taylor	United Kingdom	The brig ran aground on the Dragoe Sand. She was on a voyage from Norrbotten, Sweden to Hartlepool, County Durham. She had been refloated by 13 November.
Berg	Spain	The brig was wrecked at "Faxo Bugt", near Reykjavík, Iceland.
Elizabeth	Norway	The ship was driven ashore at Carquet, New Brunswick, Canada. She was on a voyage from Quebec City, Canada to Grimsby, Lincolnshire, United Kingdom. She was consequently condemned.
Gamla Galante	Sweden	The ship was driven ashore west of Stolpemünde, Prussia. She was on a voyage from Hudiksvall to London, United Kingdom.
Jane	United Kingdom	The ship was driven ashore and wrecked on "Lansholm". Her crew were rescued. She was on a voyage from Newcastle upon Tyne, Northumberland to Stockholm, Sweden.
Vialka	Sweden	The brig was wrecked on "Sandhoe". She was on a voyage from Gävle to Hartlepool.
Unnamed	United Kingdom	The brig was driven ashore near "Voeglers", Prussia.

== 13 November ==
List of shipwrecks: 13 November 1867
Ship	State	Description
Endora	United Kingdom	The ship foundered in the Black Sea off "Cape Eumona". Her crew were rescued. She was on a voyage from Nicolaieff, Russia to an English port.
Fanny	United Kingdom	The sloop collided with the steamship Halcyon (United Kingdom) and sank in the River Avon. She was on a voyage from Cardiff, Glamorgan to Bristol, Gloucestershire.
Hendrick Hudson	United States	The schooner-rigged screw steamer was wrecked off Havana, Cuba. All on board were rescued.
Nonpareil	United Kingdom	The barque struck the Mort Rock. She was on a voyage from London to Cardiff, Glamorgan. She put in to Bideford, Devon in a leaky condition.
Pride of the Wear	United Kingdom	The ship ran aground on the Corton Sand, in the North Sea off the coast of Suffolk. She was on a voyage from Sunderland, County Durham to Alexandria, Egypt. She was refloated and towed in to Lowestoft, Suffolk for repairs.

== 14 November ==
List of shipwrecks: 14 November 1867
Ship	State	Description
Bessie	United Kingdom	The brig was run into by the steamship Biddick and sank off Whitby, Yorkshire. Her crew were rescued.
Carlshaven	Bremen	The ship departed from New York, United States for Bremen. No further trace, presumed foundered with the loss of all hands.
Fortuna	Norway	The barque ran aground on the Droogden, in the Baltic Sea. She was on a voyage from Sundsvall to London, United Kingdom. Fortuna was refloated and taken in to Copenhagen, Denmark in a leaky condition. She was placed under repair.
Perthshire	United Kingdom	The ship ran aground on the Haisborough Sands, in the North Sea off the coast of Norfolk and sank. Her crew were rescued by the smack Tyro (United Kingdom). Perthshire was on a voyage from Ipswich, Suffolk to Newcastle upon Tyne, Northumberland.
Vixen	United Kingdom	The ship ran aground on the Scroby Sands, Norfolk. She was refloated and beached at Scratby, Norfolk. Vixen was refloated on 16 November and towed in to Great Yarmouth, Norfolk.
Woodbine	United Kingdom	The ship departed from Beyrout, Ottoman Syria for Mersin, Ottoman Empire. Said to have been subsequently lost.
Unnamed	Flag unknown	The brig was wrecked on the Haisborough Sands with the loss of all hands.

== 15 November ==
List of shipwrecks: 15 November 1867
Ship	State	Description
Anna Magnan	United Kingdom	The ship was wrecked at "Killia".
Coral Queen	United Kingdom	The steamship was driven ashore at the Böttö Lighthouse, near Gothenburg, Sweden. She was on a voyage from Hartlepool, County Durham to Gothenburg. She was refloated on 17 November and taken in to Gothenburg.
Fanny B	United Kingdom	The ship was wrecked at "Killia".
Industry	United Kingdom	The ship was driven ashore at Marsden, County Durham. Her crew were rescued. She was on a voyage from Sunderland, County Durham to Newcastle upon Tyne, Northumberland.
Kelvin	United Kingdom	The ship departed from Alexandria, Egypt for a British port. No furthert trace, presumed foundered with the loss of all hands.
Minerva	Denmark	The galeas departed from a Norwegian port for an English port. Presumed subsequently foundered with the loss of all hands; seven casks of butter from the ship washed up at Whitby, Yorkshire, United Kingdom in December.
Noah	(United Kingdom of Great Britain and Ireland) Isle of Man	The fishing lugger was driven ashore and wrecked on Kenny Point. Her crew were rescued. She was on a voyage from Dublin to Peel.
Portsmouth	United States	The wooden steamer was on a voyage from Marquette, Michigan, to Buffalo, New York, with a cargo of pig iron when she ran aground on Middle Island in Lake Huron off the coast of Michigan and broke up. Her wreck lies in 8 feet (2.4 m) of water at 45.197056°N 83.335556°W.
Tonsberghaus	Norway	The barque ran aground on the Shipwash Sand, in the North Sea off the coast of Suffolk, United Kingdom. She was on a voyage from Christiania to Alexandria, Egypt. She was refloated and assisted in to Harwich, Essex, United Kingdom.

== 16 November ==
List of shipwrecks: 16 November 1867
Ship	State	Description
Australian Messenger	United Kingdom	The ship was driven ashore and wreckeded at Ambleteuse, Pas-de-Calais, France. Her crew were rescued. She was on a voyage from Gaza, Egypt to Dunkirk, Nord.
Babineau and Gandry	United Kingdom	The ship departed from Montreal, Quebec, Canada for Saint John's, Newfoundland Colony. No further trace, presumed foundered with the loss of all hands.
Cherokee	Canada	The ship was driven ashore on Janvrin Island, Nova Scotia. She was on a voyage from Miramichi, New Brunswick to Liverpool, Lancashire. She was refloated and towed in to Caribou Cove.
Christine	United Kingdom	The ship was driven ashore. She was on a voyage from Anklam, Prussia to London. She was refloated and taken in to Tönning, Prussia.
Evarista	Portugal	The brig departed from Faial Island, Azores for Boston, Massachusetts United States. No further trace, presumed foundered with the loss of her crew and all 87 passengers.
Fem Sodskende	Norway	The ship was driven ashore and sank at Fredrikshavn, Denmark. She was on a voyage from Bergen to Rostock.
Lord Clyde	United Kingdom	The barque ran aground on the Corton Sand, in the North Sea off the coast of Suffolk and sank. All eleven people on board were resccued by the Gorleston Lifeboat. She was on a voyage from Galaţi, Ottoman Empire to Newcastle upon Tyne, Northumberland. The wreck was dispersed by explosives in March 1868.
Mary Ann	United Kingdom	The schooner was driven ashore at Lowestoft, Suffolk. Her crew survived. She was on a voyage from Hartlepool, County Durham to Mundesley, Norfolk.
Nina	United Kingdom	The brig ran aground on the Droogden, in the Baltic Sea. She was on a voyage from Stettin to London. She was refloated and put in to Copenhagen, Denmark.
Perthshire	United Kingdom	The schooner was wrecked on the Haisborough Sands, in the North Sea off the coast of Norfolk. Her five crew were rescued by a smack. She was on a voyage from Ipswich, Suffolk to Newcastle upon Tyne.
Venus	United Kingdom	The brig ran aground on the Blacktail Sand, in the Thames Estuary.
Unnames	United Kingdom	The ship capsized off Burghead, Moray with the loss of all four crew.

== 17 November ==
List of shipwrecks: 17 November 1867
Ship	State	Description
Albion	United Kingdom	The ship was driven ashore at Bridlington, Yorkshire.
Ardent	United Kingdom	The brig was abandoned in the Lynn Deeps. Her crew survived. She was on a voyage from South Shields, County Durham to Barking, Essex. Ardent foundered off the Boston Outer Knock.
Belle of the Mersey	United Kingdom	The ship departed from Lagos, Africa for Liverpool, Lancashire. No further trace, presumed foundered with the loss of all hands.
Benstead	United Kingdom	The schooner was driven ashore and wrecked near Kessingland, Suffolk. Her crew were rescued.
Boston	United Kingdom	The schooner ran aground on the Little Burbo Bank, in Liverpool Bay. She was on a voyage from Liverpool to Newry, County Antrim. She was refloated with assistance from the tug Reliance (United Kingdom) and beached at New Brighton, Cheshire.
Clipper	United Kingdom	The schooner was driven ashore and wrecked at Kessingland. Her five crew were rescued. She was on a voyage from London to Scarborough, Yorkshire.
Contest	(United Kingdom of Great Britain and Ireland) Guernsey	The ship was wrecked on the Hook Sand, in the English Channel off the coast of Dorset. All 46 people on board were rescued by the Poole Lifeboat Manley Wood ( Royal National Lifeboat Institution). Contest was on a voyage from Guernsey to London.
Courier	United Kingdom	The ship was driven ashore at Pakefield, Suffolk. She had become a wreck by 20 December.
Decision	United Kingdom	The ship was driven ashore and wrecked at Bridlington. She was on a voyage from Burnham-on-Crouch, Essex to Sunderland, County Durham.
Francis	Netherlands	The galiot was driven ashore and wrecked at Benacre, Suffolk. Her crew were rescued. She was on a voyage from Vlissingen, Zeeland to Newcastle upon Tyne, Northumberland, United Kingdom.
George	United Kingdom	The brig foundered in the North Sea with the loss of six of her seven crew. The survivor was rescued by the Mundesley Lifeboat Grocers ( Royal National Lifeboat Institution). George was on a voyage from Sunderland to Rouen, Seine-Inférieure, France.
Hero	United Kingdom	The schooner was wrecked at Cromer, Norfolk with the loss of all hands.
Marie	Greifswald	The brig ran aground on the Ronie Spit, in the Bristol Channel off the coast of Glamorgan, United Kingdom. Her eleven crew were rescued by the Penarth Lifeboat. She was on a voyage from Gloucester to Cardiff, Glamorgan.
Medora	United Kingdom	The schooner was wrecked on the Newcombe Sands, in the North Sea off the coast of Suffolk with the loss of three of her five crew. Survivors were rescued by the Kessingland Lifeboat.
Muscatel	United Kingdom	The ship departed from Montreal, Quebec, Canada for Glasgow, Renfrewshire. No further trace, presumed foundered with the loss of all hands.
Naomi	United Kingdom	The ship was driven ashore at Bridlington. She was on a voyage from Colchester, Essex to Seaham, County Durham.
Northern Crown	United Kingdom	The barque was wrecked on the Emily Shoals. Her crew were rescued. She was on a voyage from Newport, Monmouthshire to Maranhão, Brazil.
Octavia	United Kingdom	The brigantine was abandoned in the Irish Sea. Her crew were rescued. She was on a voyage from Barrow-in-Furness, Lancashire to Glasgow. She was taken in to Beaumaris, Anglesey on 19 November by the tug Merry Andrew (United Kingdom).
Pequod	United Kingdom	The ship was driven ashore in Dublin Bay.
Picture	United Kingdom	The ship was sighted in the Atlantic Ocean whilst on a voyage from Liverpool to Bombay, India. No further trace, presumed foundered with the loss of all hands.
Po	United Kingdom	The brigantine was driven ashore and wrecked at Kessingland. Her crew were rescued by the Coastguard using rocket apparatus. She was on a voyage from Hartlepool, County Durham to Sandwich, Kent.
Plowman	United Kingdom	The smack was abandoned off Great Yarmouth. Her seven crew were rescued by the Great Yarmouth surf lifeboat.
Princess Royal	United Kingdom	The barque was driven ashore on Skagen, Denmark. She was on a voyage from Kronstadt, Russia to London.
Pyrrhus	United Kingdom	The ship ran aground on the Petrosko Bank, in the Black Sea and was abandoned by her crew. She had been refloated by 28 November and taken in to Taganrog, Russia.
Racer	United Kingdom	The smack was run into by the smack Providence (United Kingdom) and sank at Brixham, Devon.
Restless	United Kingdom	The schooner was wrecked on the Haisborough Sands, in the North Sea off the coast of Norfolk. Her crew got on board the Haisborough Lightship ( Trinity House), from where they were rescued by the Caister Lifeboat Grocers ( Royal National Lifeboat Institution). Restless was on a voyage from Stettin to Portsmouth, Hampshire.
Rienzi	(United Kingdom of Great Britain and Ireland) Jersey	The ship was driven ashore and wrecked at "Marieux", Côtes-du-Nord, France with the loss of all hands.
Roe	United Kingdom	The ship was driven ashore and wrecked at Kessingland.
Rosehill	United Kingdom	The ship was driven ashore at Bridlington. She was on a voyage from Calais, France to Blyth, Northumberland.
Rosi	United Kingdom	The schooner was driven ashore at Covehithe, Suffolk. Her crew were rescued. She was on a voyage from London to South Shields.
Studley	United Kingdom	The ship was driven ashore at Bridlington.
Swan	United Kingdom	The ship struck a submerged object and sank at Lowestoft.
Volunteer	United Kingdom	The schooner was driven ashore at Pakefield. Her crew were rescued. She was on a voyage from Dunkirk, Nord, France to Bridlington, Yorkshire. Volunteer had become a wreck by 20 November.
Unnamed	Flag unknown	The ship sank in the North Sea off Sutton-on-Sea, Lincolnshire.

== 18 November ==
List of shipwrecks: 18 November 1867
Ship	State	Description
Alfred	France	The schooner was abandoned in the Bay of Biscay. Her crew were rescued by the steamship Lena (United Kingdom). Alfred was on a voyage from Bordeaux, Gironde to Caen, Calvados.
Ariadne	United Kingdom	The ship departed from Baltimore, Maryland, United States for Belfast, County Antrim. No further trace, presumed foundered with the loss of all hands.
USS De Soto	United States Navy	A tsunami tore the sidewheel paddle steamer from her moorings at St. Thomas in the Danish Virgin Islands and threw her onto a wharf. A later tsunami wave picked her up off the wharf and washed her back into the harbor, where her crew was able to effect repairs that kept her from sinking.
Falcon	United Kingdom	The ship was driven ashore at Fishguard, Pembrokeshire.
Julie Heyn	United Kingdom	The ship was driven ashore on "Est Mounr". She was on a voyage from Saint Petersburg, Russia to London.
USS Monongahela	United States Navy	The sloop of war was driven ashore at Saint Thomas by a tsunami. She was refloated on 11 May 1868.
Prince Albert	United Kingdom	The ship was driven ashore near "Holbeck", Denmark. She was on a voyage from Stettin to Leith, Lothian.
Polydesa	Norway	The schooner ran aground on the Cross Sand, in the North Sea off the coast of Norfolk. She was refloated with assistance from the Caister Lifeboat Birmingham No.2 ( Royal National Lifeboat Institution) and assisted in to Great Yarmouth with the assistance of a tug.
Regina	United Kingdom	The ship was driven ashore. She was on a voyage from Sunderland, County Durham to Malta. She was refloated and taken in to London in a leaky condition.
Thetis	Sweden	The ship was wrecked on the Woolpack Sand, in The Wash. Her sixteen crew were rescued by the Hunstanton Lifeboat Licensed Victualler ( Royal National Lifeboat Institution). Thetis was on a voyage from Gothenburg to London, United Kingdom.
Vallisneria	United Kingdom	The barque-rigged steamship ran aground on the Newcombe Sand, in the North Sea off the coast of Suffolk. She was on a voyage from Sunderland to Ostend, West Flanders, Belgium. She was refloated but drove ashore at Lowestoft. Her crew were rescued.

== 19 November ==
List of shipwrecks: 19 November 1867
Ship	State	Description
British Queen	United Kingdom	The ship was abandoned in the Atlantic Ocean. Her crew were rescued by Melrose (United Kingdom). British Queen was on a voyage from Falmouth, Cornwall to New York, United States.
Justitia	(Russian Empire) Grand Duchy of Finland	The brig was driven ashore on Læsø, Denmark. She was on a voyage from Narva, Russia to Leith, Lothian, United Kingdom. She was refloated on 24 November and taken in to Fredrikshavn, Denmark.
Margaretha	United Kingdom	The ship was driven ashore at Reval, Russia. Her crew were rescued. She was on a voyage from Newcastle upon Tyne, Northumberland to Reval.
Prince Alfred	United Kingdom	The ship ran aground near "Villingebock", Denmark. She was on a voyage from Stettin to Leith. She was refloated on 28 November and towed in to Helsingør, Denmark by the steamship Skandinavien (Denmark.
Sabina	Bremen	The ship was driven ashore at Reval. She was on a voyage from Reval to the Weser.
Sparkling Wave	United Kingdom	The barque was abandoned at sea. Her crew were rescued by Sir G. F. Seymour (United Kingdom). Sparking Wave was on a voyage from Benin City to Liverpool, Lancashire. She was subsequently taken in to Lisbon, Portugal in a derelict condition by the brigantine Ocata (Spain).

== 20 November ==
List of shipwrecks: 20 November 1867
Ship	State	Description
Courier	United Kingdom	The ship was abandoned off the Goodwin Sands, Kent. Her crew survived.
Elizabeth and Mary	United Kingdom	The smack foundered off Bardsey Island, Pembrokeshire. Her crew were rescued. She was on a voyage from the River Dee to Aberdovey, Merionethshire.
Helmi	Norway	The ship ran aground. She was on a voyage from Kristiansand to Porto, Portugal. She was refloated and taken in to King's Lynn, Norfolk, United Kingdom in a waterlogged condition.
Neptunus	Danzig	The ship was driven ashore at Höganäs, Sweden. She was on a voyage from Danzig to Grangemouth, Stirlingshire, United Kingdom.
Nordcap	Russia	The ship was driven ashore. She was on a voyage from Kronstadt to Libava, Courland Governorate. She was refloated and taken in to Baltic Port in a leaky condition.
Ragnar	Sweden	The ship was driven ashore. She was on a voyage from Härnösand to Hull, Yorkshire, United Kingdom. She was refloated and taken in to Helsingør, Denmark.
Sedulous	United Kingdom	The ship sank at Porthdinllaen, Caernarfonshire. She was on a voyage from Liverpool, Lancashire to Port Madoc, Caernarfonshire.
Summer	United Kingdom	The ship was driven ashore at Placentia, Newfoundland Colony. She was on a voyage from Montreal, Quebec, Canada to London. She was consequently condemned.
Sydenham	United Kingdom	The ship ran aground on the Seven Foot Knoll. She was on a voyage from Cardiff, Glamorgan to Baltimore, Maryland, United States.
Talisman	United Kingdom	The ship ran aground on the Great Burbo Bank, in Liverpool Bay. She was on a voyage from Liverpool, Lancashire to Barbados. She was refloated the next day and resumed her voyage.

== 21 November ==
List of shipwrecks: 21 November 1867
Ship	State	Description
Avon	United Kingdom	The ship was driven ashore in the Saint Lawrence River downstream of Montreal, Quebec, Canada. She was on a voyage from Montreal to Liverpool, Lancashire.
Hath	United Kingdom	The brig sprang a leak and was abandoned in the North Sea. Her crew were rescued. She was on a voyage from Sunderland, County Durham to Hamburg.
Opal	United Kingdom	The ship was driven ashore and severely damaged at Dieppe, Seine-Inférieure, France. She was on a voyage from Newcastle upon Tyne, Northumberland to Dieppe.
Star	United Kingdom	The ship ran aground. She was on a voyage from London to Hull, Yorkshire. She was refloated and taken in to Boston, Lincolnshire in a leaky condition.

== 22 November ==
List of shipwrecks: 22 November 1867
Ship	State	Description
Bubulina	(Kingdom of Greece) Royal Greek Navy	The steamship was split in two by a boiler explosion in the River Mersey at Liverpool, Lancashire, United Kingdom with the loss of about 40 of the 82 people on board. Survivors were rescued by the steamboat Ant (United Kingdom and boats from HMS Donegal (Royal Navy). Bubulina was on a voyage from Liverpool to Piraeus.
Hepene	(Russian Empire) Grand Duchy of Finland	The ship ran aground. She was on a voyage from Kristianstad to Porto, Portugal. She was refloated and taken in to King's Lynn, Norfolk, United Kingdom in a waterlogged condition.
Hemisphere	United Kingdom	The ship foundered in the Atlantic Ocean. Her 26 crew were rescued by Otogo (Spain). Hemisphere was on a voyage from Bassein, India to Liverpool, Lancashire.
Highlander	(United Kingdom of Great Britain and Ireland) New South Wales	The brig was driven ashore and wrecked at the mouth of the Omaru River, New Zealand. Her crew were rescued.
William and Thomas	United Kingdom	The fishing smack sailed from Great Yarmouth, Norfolk. No further trace, presumed foundered with the loss of all hands.

== 23 November ==
List of shipwrecks: 23 November 1867
Ship	State	Description
Antelope	Kolberg	The ship was wrecked on Bornholm, Denmark. Her crew were rescued. She was on a voyage from Grimsby, Lincolnshire, United Kingdom to Memel, Prussia.
Emile	Denmark	The ship was wrecked at Ålsgårde. She was on a voyage from Horsens to an English port.
Highlander	(United Kingdom of Great Britain and Ireland) New Zealand	The brig parted her cables and went ashore at Oamaru.
Levy	(United Kingdom of Great Britain and Ireland) New Zealand	The barque foundered on the bar at Sumner while carrying coal from Lyttelton to Heathcote. All hands were saved.

== 24 November ==
List of shipwrecks: 24 November 1867
Ship	State	Description
Brunt	United Kingdom	The barque was driven ashore on Vlieland, Friesland, Netherlands with the loss of three of her fifteen crew. She was on a voyage from South Shields, County Durham, United Kingdom to Danzig.
Caroline	(United Kingdom of Great Britain and Ireland) New Zealand	The schooner was wrecked at Oamaru. She was attempting to put to sea in a heavy gale when her sails split and she became unmanageable.
Fortuna	United Kingdom	The ship departed from Queenstown, County Cork for Newcastle upon Tyne, Northumberland. No further trace, presumed foundered with the loss of all hands.
Industry	United Kingdom	The ship collided with Betty (Sweden and sank in the North Sea off the coast of Suffolk. Her crew were rescued.
Lark	United Kingdom	The schooner was abandoned in the North Sea 5 nautical miles (9.3 km) off Macduff, Aberdeenshire. Her crew were rescued. She was on a voyage from Burghead, Moray to the Elbe or the Rhine.

== 25 November ==
List of shipwrecks: 25 November 1867
Ship	State	Description
Assistant	Norway	The schooner ran aground on the Barber Sand, in the North Sea off the coast of Norfolk, United Kingdom. She was on a voyage from Stavanger to Rio de Janeiro, Brazil.
Concordia	United Kingdom	The ship was driven ashore between Leffrinckoucke and Zuydcoote, Belgium. She was on a voyage from Sunderland, County Durham to Bayonne, Loire-Inférieure, France. She was refloated on 1 December and taken in to Vlissingen, Zeeland, Netherlands for inspection. She was subsequently sent to Harwich, Essex for repairs.
Fleetwing	United States	The ship departed from New York for Porto, Portugal. No further trace, presumed foundered with the loss of all hands.
Harlington	United Kingdom	The ship was driven ashore at Narva, Russia.
Industry	United Kingdom	The ship collided with a Swedish schooner and sank in the Swin. Her crew were rescued by a smack. She was on a voyage from Hartlepool, County Durham to Faversham, Kent.
Kraut	Danzig	The ship was driven ashore and wrecked on Vlieland, Friesland, Netherlands. She was on a voyage from South Shields, County Durham, United Kingdom to Danzig.
Reliance	United Kingdom	The brig ran aground at Blakeney, Norfolk. She was on a voyage from Sunderland, County Durham to London.

== 26 November ==
List of shipwrecks: 26 November 1867
Ship	State	Description
Arabian	United States	The full-rigged ship was sighted off South Shields, County Durham, United Kingdom whilst on a voyage from Bremen to the River Tyne. No further trace, presumed foundered with the loss of all on board.
Atieth Bahaman	Flag unknown	The ship was wrecked on Sandy Island, Andaman and Nicobar Islands. All 57 people on board survived; some of them reached Mauritius in a boat. The brig Pionneer (France) was despatched and rescued the remainder after 15 December.
Auguste and Victor	France	The ship was driven ashore at Dieppe, Seine-Inférieure. She was on a voyage from Fredrikshavn, Denmark to Dieppe. She became a wreck on 14 December.
Giraffe	France	The schooner was driven ashore between Wells-next-the-Sea and Blakeney, Norfolk, United Kingdom.
Goldstone	Canada	The ship ran aground at Pictou, Nova Scotia. She was refloated and put back to Pictou for repairs.
Joven Francisca	Portugal	The ship was abandoned off the Isles of Scilly, United Kingdom. Her crew were rescued by the barque Arbute (United Kingdom). Joven Francisca was on a voyage from Bahia, Brazil to Lisbon.
New England	United States	The ship departed from Savannah, Georgia for Liverpool, Lancashire, United Kingdom. No further trace, presumed foundered with the loss of all hands.
Ocean Home	United Kingdom	The full-rigged ship ran aground, capsized and sank at the mouth of the River Mersey with the loss of two of the 26 people on board. Survivors were rescued by the lifeboat Liverpool No. 1 ( Royal National Lifeboat Institution). Ocean Home was on a voyage from Liverpool, Lancashire to Bombay, India.
Victor	United Kingdom	The ship was run into by the brig Artaxerxes (United Kingdom) and sank off the mouth of the Humber with the loss of three of her five crew. Survivors were rescued by Artaxerxes. Victor was on a voyage from the River Tyne to Faversham, Kent.

== 27 November ==
List of shipwrecks: 27 November 1867
Ship	State	Description
Britannia	United Kingdom	The ship was wrecked on Anholt. Her five crew were rescued. She was on a voyage from Newcastle upon Tyne, Northumberland to Copenhagen, Denmark.
Brothers	United Kingdom	The fishing smack sailed from Great Yarmouth, Norfolk. No further trace, presumed foundered with the loss of all hands.
Cecrops	United States	The ship departed from New York for Gibraltar. No further trace, presumed foundered in the Atlantic Ocean with the loss of all hands.
Charlotte	United Kingdom	The ship was wrecked on Anholt with the loss of all hands. She was on a voyage from Seaham, County Durham to Stettin.
Dunkerquois	France	The schooner ran aground on the Goodwin Sands, Kent, United Kingdom. Her seven crew were rescued by the Broadstairs Lifeboat. Dunkerquios was on a voyage from Dunkirk, Nord to Cardiff, Glamorgan. She was refloated but consequently sank.
Enchantress	United Kingdom	The ship was driven ashore at Meeting House Point, County Antrim. She was on a voyage from Maryport, Cumberland to Belfast, County Antrim. She was refloated and towed in to Belfast.
Gertruida Antina	Netherlands	The ship was driven ashore at Domesnes, Russia. She was on a voyage from Riga, Russia to Harlingen, Friesland.
Isabella	United Kingdom	The ship sank in the Irish Sea. She was on a voyage from Port Dinorwic, Caernarfonshire to Silloth, Cumberland.
Runo	United Kingdom	The brig was driven ashore at Fairlight, Sussex. She was on a voyage from South Shields, County Durham to Lisbon, Portugal.
St. George	United Kingdom	The ship was driven ashore in Trepassey Bay. She was on a voyage from Quebec City, Canada to London. She was consequently condemned.
Trinity	United Kingdom	The barque ran aground on the Goodwin Sands. She was on a voyage from Dunkirk to Cardiff. She was refloated and resumed her voyage.
Victory	United Kingdom	The ship foundered in the Mediterranean Sea 290 nautical miles (540 km) east of Malta. Her crew were rescued by the barque Vohm (Austria-Hungary).
Yzarra	Spain	The barque sank off "Donningsboom", Norway. Her crew were rescued. She was on a voyage from Greenock, Renfrewshire, United Kingdom to Christiania, Norway.

== 29 November ==
List of shipwrecks: 29 November 1867
Ship	State	Description
Astrea	United Kingdom	The ship was wrecked near Gallipoli, Ottoman Empire with the loss of five of her crew. She was on a voyage from Sulina, Ottoman Empire to an English port.
Mysore	United Kingdom	The barque ran aground on the Haisborough Sands, in the North Sea off the coast of Norfolk. She was on a voyage from Spain to Aberdeen. She floated off but consequently sank. Her crew were rescued by the smack Anenome (United Kingdom).
Osprey	United Kingdom	The ship was wrecked on Terceira Island, Azores.
Rio de Janeiro	Brazil	The ship was driven ashore and wrecked on Espalamanca Point, Faial Island, Azores with the loss of six of her 23 crew.
Sclavonia	Russia	The ship was sighted off Aldeburgh, Suffolk, United Kingdom whilst on a voyage from Taganrog to Leith, Lothian, United Kingdom. No further trace, presumed foundered in the North Sea with the loss of all hands.
Siberia	United Kingdom	The schooner was driven ashore and wrecked at Hythe, Kent. She was on a voyage from Swansea, Glamorgan to Hythe.
Stag Cruz	Portugal	The schooner was driven ashore and wrecked on Faial Island.
St. George	United Kingdom	The ship was driven ashore in Trepassey Bay. She was on a voyage form Quebec City, Canada to London.
Unnamed	United Kingdom	The brigantine was driven ashore on Sheep Island, County Galway.

== 30 November ==
List of shipwrecks: 30 November 1867
Ship	State	Description
Ann	United Kingdom	The schooner was driven ashore at the Point of Ayr, Cheshire.
Bristol	United Kingdom	The steamship foundered in the English Channel 20 nautical miles (37 km) off Start Point, Devon with the loss of three of the nineteen people on board. Survivors were rescued by the brig Flink (Denmark). Bristol was on a voyage from Middlesbrough, Yorkshire to Briton Ferry, Glamorgan.
Catherine	United Kingdom	The collier, a brig, was run down and sunk by a steamship in Robin Hoods Bay. Her crew were rescued.
Edith	United Kingdom	The sloop was driven ashore and wrecked between Llanfairfechan and Penmaenmawr, Denbighshire with the loss of one of the four people on board. She was on a voyage from Runcorn, Cheshire to Penmaenmawr.
George Walker	United Kingdom	The brigantine was wrecked in Cawraes bay with the loss of four of her crew. She was on a voyage from the River Mersey to Santander, Spain.
Henrietta	United Kingdom	The ship was driven ashore on Mutton Island, County Clare. She was on a voyage from Cap Haïtien, Haiti to Liverpool, Lancashire. She was refloated and completed her voyage.
Jenny	United Kingdom	The brig was driven ashore and wrecked at Whitburn, County Durham. Her six crew were rescued by the Whitburn Lifeboat Thomas Wilson ( Royal National Lifeboat Institution). She was on a voyage from Dunkirk, Nord to South Shields, County Durham.
John Henry	United Kingdom	The full-rigged ship was driven ashore in the South West Pass of the Mississippi River. She was refloated.
Lena	United Kingdom	The brig was wrecked on the Goodwin Sands, Kent with the loss of five of her nine crew. Survivors were rescued by the pilot cutter No. 7 (Netherlands). Lena was on a voyage from Galaţi, Ottoman Empire to Hull, Yorkshire.
Lydia Mary	United Kingdom	The ship was wrecked in Caite Bay. She was on a voyage from Newport, Monmouthshire to Pará, Brazil.
Maasluis	Netherlands	The ship departed from Amsterdam, North Holland for Newcastle upon Tyne, Northumberland, United Kingdom. No further trace, presumed foundered with the loss of all hands.
Malona	United Kingdom	The brigantine ran aground on the Barnard Sand, in the North Sea off the coast of Suffolk. She was on a voyage from Seaham, County Durham to London. She was refloated and taken in to Lowestoft, Suffolk in a leaky condition.
Mary Elizabeth	United Kingdom	The schooner sprang a leak and foundered off Holyhead, Anglesey with the loss of her captain. Three survivors were rescued by the tug Speedwell (United Kingdom). Mary Elizabeth was on a voyage from Runcorn, Cheshire to a Welsh port.
Naomi	United Kingdom	The brigantine ran aground on the Barnard Sand. She was refloated and taken in to Lowestoft.
Ocean	Russia	The barque was abandoned off the Leman Sand, in the North Sea. Her crew survived.
Olive Branch	United Kingdom	The schooner was driven ashore and wrecked in the Bay of Rigg. Her crew were rescued. She was on a voyage from Belfast, County Antrim to "Marypool".
Regina	United Kingdom	The barque was wrecked at St. Mary's, Nova Scotia, Canada. She was on a voyage from Glasgow, Renfrewshire to New York, United States.
Sir John Lawrence	United Kingdom	The ship departed from New York for London. No further trace, presumed foundered with the loss of all hands.
Snowdrop	United Kingdom	The ship departed from Sunderland, County Durham for Leith, Lothian. No further trace, presumed foundered with the loss of all hands.
Stag	United Kingdom	The ship ran aground on the Hare Island Shoal, in the Saint Lawrence River. She was on a voyage from Montreal, Quebec, Canada to London.
Unity	United Kingdom	The schooner was run into by Royal Consort (United Kingdom) and sank at Aberdeen.
Vesper	United Kingdom	The brig was driven ashore and wrecked at Seaton Carew, County Durham. Her crew were rescued.
Vienna	Hamburg	The steamship departed from Hamburg for Leith. No further trace, presumed foundered with the loss of all hands.
Wallasey	United Kingdom	The steamship struck the slipway at Seacombe, Cheshire and sank in the River Mersey.
Wilhelmina	Prussia	The ship was damaged by an onboard explosion at Cardiff, Glamorgan.
Unnamed	United Kingdom	The pilot boat, a yawl, was abandoned in the Irish Sea 12 nautical miles (22 km) south west of Carlingford, County Louth. Her six crew were rescued by RMS Munster (United Kingdom).
Unnamed	United Kingdom	The smack sank in the River Mersey at Tranmere, Cheshire. Her crew survived.

== Unknown date ==
List of shipwrecks: Unknown date in November 1867
Ship	State	Description
Aegir	United Kingdom	The ship was driven ashore and sank near the Böttö Lighthouse, Sweden. She was on a voyage from Hartlepool, County Durham to Gothenburg, Sweden.
Alliance	United Kingdom	The brig was abandoned in the North Sea.
Britannia	United Kingdom	The ship ran aground on the Corton Sand, in the North Sea off the coast of Suffolk. She was refloated, but later ran aground on th Pye Sand, off the coast of Essex. She was refloated with assistance from the tug Robert Owen (United Kingdom) and towed in to the Handford Water.
Ebenezer	Norway	The brig foundered in the North Sea. Her crew were rescued by Jacob Bernardus (Netherlands). Ebenezer was on a voyage from Blyth, Northumberland, United Kingdom to Drammen.
Eden	United Kingdom	The ship caught fire in the North Sea and foundered. Her eight crew were rescued by Copernicus ( Grand Duchy of Mecklenburg-Schwerin).
Elpis	Russia	The brig was wrecked at "Fenderaclia".
Flora	United Kingdom	The ship was run down and sunk in the English Channel by a steamship. She was on a voyage from Sunderland, County Durham to Saint Thomas, Virgin Islands.
Harmina	Flag unknown	The ship was wrecked near Lemvig, Denmark.
Harriet	United Kingdom	The ship was wrecked near Escuminac, New Brunswick, Canada. She was on a voyage from Waterford to Quebec City, Canada.
Heima	Sweden	The ship was wrecked. She was on a voyage from Stockholm to Gotland.
Helen	United Kingdom	The ship was driven ashore at Hela, Prussia.
Imogen	(United Kingdom of Great Britain and Ireland) Cape Colony	The ship was wrecked at East London.
Joven San Pablo	Spain	The ship was driven ashore at Manila, Spanish East Indies.
Ondri	Russia	The brig was wrecked at "Fenderaclia".
Paul August	Kolberg	The brig ran aground on the Leliesand. She was on a voyage form London to Kolberg. She was refloated.
Philomena	United Kingdom	The ship was wrecked on Formosa.
San Spiridone	Flag unknown	The ship was wrecked at "Fenderaclia".
St. Josė	Spain	The ship was driven ashore near Málaga.
Unnamed	Denmark	The ship foundered. Her crew were rescued. She was on a voyage from Copenhagen to "Passos", Iceland.
