= List of shipwrecks in June 1852 =

The list of shipwrecks in June 1852 includes ships sunk, foundered, wrecked, grounded, or otherwise lost during June 1852.

== 1 June ==
List of shipwrecks: 1 June 1852
Ship	State	Description
HMS Gladiator	Royal Navy	The Cyclops-class frigate ran aground at Portsmouth, Hampshire. She was refloated.

== 2 June ==
List of shipwrecks: 2 June 1852
Ship	State	Description
Dublin	United Kingdom	The barque sprang a leak and was abandoned off the Sandheads, India. She was on a voyage from Calcutta, India to London. She sank the next day.
Fame	United Kingdom	The schooner ran aground on the Longsand, in the North Sea off the coast of Essex. She was on a voyage from Cardiff, Glamorgan to London. She was refloated and taken in to Margate, Kent.

== 3 June ==
List of shipwrecks: 3 June 1852
Ship	State	Description
Sally, or Sarah	United Kingdom	The ship struck a sandbank and capsized in the River Ribble at Lytham St. Annes, Lancashire with the loss of her captain. She then drifted onto another sandbank and the survivors were rescued. She was righted and taken in to Lytham St. Annes.

== 4 June ==
List of shipwrecks: 4 June 1852
Ship	State	Description
Camoena	(United Kingdom of Great Britain and Ireland) Jamaica	The ship was wrecked off Bermuda. She was on a voyage from Jamaica to Bermuda.

== 5 June ==
List of shipwrecks: 5 June 1852
Ship	State	Description
Beehive	United Kingdom	The ship collided with the steamship Clyde (United Kingdom) and sank between the Mouse and Maplin Sands, in the North Sea off the coast of Essex with the loss of all but one of her four crew. The survivor was rescued by Clyde. Beehive was on a voyage from Glasgow, Renfrewshire to London.
Henry	(United Kingdom of Great Britain and Ireland) New Zealand	The schooner was wrecked at the mouth of Wellington Harbour while en route from Porirua, with the loss of all hands.
Prince of Wales	United Kingdom	The ship sailed from the Danube for Falmouth, Cornwall. No further trace, presumed foundered with the loss of all hands.
Ranger	United Kingdom	The ship was abandoned in the Irish Sea 9 nautical miles (17 km) east of the Arklow Lightship ( Trinity House). Her crew were rescued by Dunna (United Kingdom). Ranger was on a voyage from Agrigento, Sicily to Liverpool, Lancashire.
Sutherland	(United Kingdom of Great Britain and Ireland) British North America	The pilot schooner capsized in the Gulf of St. Lawrence with the loss of all on board.

== 6 June ==
List of shipwrecks: 6 June 1852
Ship	State	Description
Mary Taylor	United Kingdom	The ship ran aground on the Demnigoes, off Nettlestone, Isle of Wight. She was on a voyage from Waterford to Portsmouth, Hampshire. She was later refloated and taken in to Portsmouth, where she arrived on 8 June.
Success	United Kingdom	The smack sank off Garron Point, County Antrim with the loss of all hands.

== 7 June ==
List of shipwrecks: 7 June 1852
Ship	State	Description
Agnes	United Kingdom	The schooner was wrecked on the Hat and Barrel Rocks, off the Isles of Scilly, with the loss of all hands.
Annette	United Kingdom	The ship ran aground on the Goodwin Sands, Kent. She was on a voyage from Rotterdam, South Holland, Netherlands to Liverpool, Lancashire. She was refloated on 13 June and beached at Kingsgate. She was refloated the next day and taken in to Ramsgate in a waterlogged condition.
St. Barbe	France	The brig sprang a leak and was abandoned in the English Channel off the Isle of Wight, United Kingdom. Assistance was offered by the steamship Gannet and also by Frankfort Packet (both United Kingdom) but was refused. Her crew reached land in their boat. She sank off Portland Bill, Dorset, United Kingdom. St. Barbe was on a voyage from Newcastle upon Tyne, Northumberland, United Kingdom to Algiers, Algeria.

== 8 June ==
List of shipwrecks: June 1852
Ship	State	Description
Christopher Colón	Spain	The ship was wrecked on the Gingerbread Shoal. She was on a voyage from New York, United States to Havana, Cuba.
Creole	United Kingdom	The schooner collided with Havre (France) off the east coast of the United States and sank.
Honour	United Kingdom	The ship ran aground on the Four Reef. She was on a voyage from Nantes, Loire-Inférieure, France to Dublin. She was refloated and put in to Le Croisic, Loire-Inférieure in a severely damaged condition.
Legerdemain	United States	The ship was wrecked on Nicholson's Shoal. Her crew were rescued. She was on a voyage from San Francisco, California to Sydney, New South Wales.

== 9 June ==
List of shipwrecks: 9 June 1852
Ship	State	Description
Countess of Durham	United Kingdom	The barque was destroyed by fire in the River Tyne at Jarrow, County Durham.
Menapia	United Kingdom	The barque was wrecked on Western Head, Nova Scotia, British North America with the loss of two lives. She was on a voyage from South Shields, County Durham to New York, United States.
Shamrock	(United Kingdom of Great Britain and Ireland) British North America	The brigantine was wrecked at "Ouse-a-Beaufils". She was on a voyage from Bathurst, New Brunswick to Saint John's, Newfoundland.

== 10 June ==
List of shipwrecks: 10 June 1852
Ship	State	Description
Elizabeth and Mary	United Kingdom	The schooner ran aground north of Ayr. She was on a voyage from The Rosses, County Donegal to Glasgow, Renfrewshire.
Grace Darling	United Kingdom	The ship was wrecked on the Cuba Keys. She was on a voyage from Saint Domingo to Liverpool, Lancashire.
Lessing	Prussia	The barque was wrecked on the coast of Labrador, British North America. All on board, more than 200 people, were rescued. She was on a voyage from Hamburg to Quebec City, Province of Canada, British North America.

== 11 June ==
List of shipwrecks: 11 June 1852
Ship	State	Description
Livorno	United Kingdom	The brig was driven ashore and wrecked near Sunderland, County Durham. Her seven crew were rescued by the Sunderland Lifeboat.
Messenger	United Kingdom	The ship was damaged by fire at Trinidad. She was on a voyage from Trinidad to Dublin.
Primrose	United Kingdom	The ship sprang a leak off Inchcape and was driven ashore on Inchkeith. She was on a voyage from Nairn to Hartlepool, County Durham. She was refloated and taken in to Leith, Lothian in a waterlogged condition.

== 12 June ==
List of shipwrecks: 12 June 1852
Ship	State	Description
Almede	United Kingdom	The ship ran aground at New Orleans, Louisiana, United States. She was on a voyage from New Orleans to Liverpool, Lancashire.
Commerce	United Kingdom	The ship ran aground in the Bristol Channel. She was on a voyage from Neath, Glamorgan to New Quay, Carmarthenshire. She was refloated and put back to Neath.
Elizabeth	(United Kingdom of Great Britain and Ireland) New South Wales	The schooner was driven ashore on "Flat-topped beach". Her crew were rescued.
Margaretha Wilhelmina	Denmark	The ship sank off the coast of Denmark. Her crew survived. She was on a voyage from a Scottish port to Odense.

== 13 June ==
List of shipwrecks: 13 June 1852
Ship	State	Description
Jean Pierre	France	The ship was wrecked on Île d'Oléron, Charente-Maritime. Her crew were rescued. She was on a voyage from Swansea, Glamorgan, United Kingdom to Bordeaux, Gironde.

== 14 June ==
List of shipwrecks: 14 June 1852
Ship	State	Description
Eugene Pierre	France	The ship was wrecked on the coast of "Manmusson". Her crew were rescued. She was on a voyage from an English port to Sain-Malo, Ille-et-Vilaine.
Forest River	United States	The steamboat suffered a boiler explosion at Cleveland, Ohio with the loss of three lives.

== 15 June ==
List of shipwrecks: 15 June 1852
Ship	State	Description
John Callum	United Kingdom	The ship ran aground on the Island Bank, off Antigua. she was refloated and resumed her voyage.
Phlegethon	Indian Navy	The steamship was driven ashore and severely damaged in the River Pegue, Burma.
Proserpine	Indian Navy	The steamship was driven ashore and severely damaged in the River Pegue.

== 16 June ==
List of shipwrecks: 16 June 1852
Ship	State	Description
Adrianus Wilhelmus, and Benton	Netherlands; United Kingdom	The barque Adrianus Wilhelmus was in collision with the brig Benton 20 nautical miles (37 km) off Dimlington, Yorkshire. Adrianus Wilhelmus was on a voyage from Hartlepool, County Durham to Aden. She put in to Bridlington, Yorkshire, where she ran aground. Benton was on a voyage from London to Newcastle upon Tyne, Northumberland. She put in to South Shields, County Durham in a wrecked condition.
Bell	United Kingdom	The ship was driven ashore at Portsmouth, Hampshire. She was on a voyage from London to Plymouth, Devon. She was refloated.
Collector	United Kingdom	The ship was damaged by fire at Sydney, New South Wales. She was on a voyage from Liverpool, Lancashire to Sydney.
Harewood	United Kingdom	The schooner was wrecked off Beer, Devon with the loss of all six crew.
Providence	United Kingdom	The smack sprang a leak and sank in Strangford Lough. She was on a voyage from Caernarfon to Largs, Ayrshire.
Seabird	United States	The barque was driven ashore on Stroma, Caithness. She was on a voyage from Newcastle upon Tyne, Northumberland, United Kingdom to Boston, Massachusetts. She was refloated on 26 June and towed in to Scrabster, Caithness, United Kingdom by the steamship Sovereign (United Kingdom).
Tophill	United Kingdom	The sloop was run down and sunk off the coast of County Durham.

== 17 June ==
List of shipwrecks: 17 June 1852
Ship	State	Description
Malabar	United Kingdom	The ship ran aground in the Saltee Islands, County Wexford. She was on a voyage from Saint John, New Brunswick, British North America to Dublin. She was refloated and taken in to Kilmore, County Wexford in a severely damaged condition.
Pauline	France	The brig was struck by a whale and sank in the Atlantic Ocean. All twelve people on board took to a boat; they were rescued on 20 June by the brig Crusader ( (United Kingdom of Great Britain and Ireland) Jersey). Pauline was on a voyage from Puerto Rico to Havre de Grâce, Seine-Inférieure.
Raby Castle	United Kingdom	The ship ran aground off Lowestoft, Suffolk. She was on a voyage from South Shields, County Durham to London. She was refloated and resumed her voyage.
Ranger	United Kingdom	The whaler was abandoned in the South Atlantic. Her twelve crew took to three whaleboats evenly divided. Four crew were rescued on 26 June by Commodore Asplett (United Kingdom). Ranger was on a voyage from Sydney, New South Wales to London.

== 18 June ==
List of shipwrecks: 18 June 1852
Ship	State	Description
Aglae Delphin	France	The brig foundered off Almería, Spain. Her crew were rescued.
Garland	United Kingdom	The ship ran aground at Mauritius. She was on a voyage from Akyab, Burma to Queenstown, County Cork. She was refloated on 22 June and resumed her voyage.
John Thompson	United Kingdom	The ship ran aground on the Hook Sand, in the English Channel. She was refloated the next day and taken in to Poole, Dorset.

== 19 June ==
List of shipwrecks: 19 June 1852
Ship	State	Description
Black Squall	(United Kingdom of Great Britain and Ireland) Victoria	The ship capsized at Melbourne.
Dove	(United Kingdom of Great Britain and Ireland) New South Wales	The ship was driven ashore and damaged at Williamstown. She was refloated.
Eliza	(United Kingdom of Great Britain and Ireland) British North America	The ship was wrecked on the Mount Desert Rock. She was on a voyage from Boston, Massachusetts, United States to Saint John, New Brunswick.
Glencairn	United Kingdom	The ship ran aground in the Clyde downstream of the mouth of the River Cart, ending up broadside across the river. She was on a voyage from the Clyde to Montreal and Quebec City, Province of Canada, British North America. She was refloated.
Pearl	United Kingdom	The steamship caught fire and was abandoned in the North Sea 45 nautical miles (83 km) off Great Yarmouth, Norfolk. Her crew were rescued. She was on a voyage from Hartlepool, County Durham to Rotterdam, South Holland, Netherlands. She sank on 21 June.
Providence	United Kingdom	The sloop was wrecked at Breaksea Point, Glamorgan. Her crew survived. She was on a voyage from Cardiff to Port Talbot.
Richmond	United Kingdom	The brig foundered in the Mediterranean Sea. Her eight crew were rescued by the brig Helen (Malta). Richmond was on a voyage from London to Alexandria, Egypt.

== 20 June ==
List of shipwrecks: 20 June 1852
Ship	State	Description
Christian	Hamburg	The full-rigged ship was wrecked 6 nautical miles (11 km) south of Payta, Peru. Her crew were rescued. Shew as on a voyage from an English port to Panama City, Republic of New Granada.
Elizabeth and Jane	United Kingdom	The ship ran aground in the Elbe at Teufelsbrück. She was on a voyage from Sunderland, County Durham to Hamburg. She was refloated and taken in to Hamburg in a severely leaky condition.
Regalia	United Kingdom	The whaler was lost in the Davis Strait.
Louis Charles	France	The ship was driven ashore and wrecked at Fécamp, Seine-Inférieure. Her crew were rescued.

== 21 June ==
List of shipwrecks: 21 June 1852
Ship	State	Description
Hereford	United Kingdom	The ship ran aground on the Weather Banks. She was on a voyage from Demerara, British Guiana to London. She was refloated and put back to Demerara, where she was condemned.
John Francis	United Kingdom	The ship was driven ashore at Matane, Province of Canada, British North America. She was refloated on 25 August and towed in to Quebec City, Province of Canada.
Lady Huntley	United Kingdom	The ship was wrecked on the South Bull, in the Irish Sea off the coast of County Dublin. Her crew were rescued. She was on a voyage from Swansea, Glamorgan to Maryport, Cumberland.
Terra Nova	United Kingdom	The ship was driven ashore at Matane. She was on a voyage from the Saint Lawrence River to London. She was later refloated.
Tyro	United Kingdom	The schooner was wrecked on the Murr Ledges. She was on a voyage from Boston, Massachusetts, United States to Parrsboro, Nova Scotia, British North America.

== 22 June ==
List of shipwrecks: 22 June 1852
Ship	State	Description
Ceres	United States	The ship was wrecked on a reef in the Fiji Islands. Her crew were rescued. She was on a voyage from San Francisco, California to Port Phillip, Victoria and Sydney, New South Wales.
Henri	France	The whaler, a full-rigged ship, was wrecked at the entrance to Lake Macquarie, New South Wales with the loss of a crew member. She was on a voyage from Sydney, New South Wales to the South Seas.
Highlander	(United Kingdom of Great Britain and Ireland) New South Wales	The ship sank off Cooranulla. Her crew were rescued.
John Elliotson	United Kingdom	The ship ran aground on the Gunfleet Sand, in the North Sea off the coast of Essex. She was on a voyage from Seaham, County Durham to London. She was refloated and taken in to Harwich, Essex in a leaky condition.
Juno	United Kingdom	The ship ran aground on the Cork Sand, in the North Sea off the coast of Suffolk. She was on a voyage from Newcastle upon Tyne, Northumberland to London. She was refloated and taken in to Harwich in a leaky condition.
Venus	(United Kingdom of Great Britain and Ireland) New South Wales	The schooner was driven ashore at Cooranulla with the loss of all hands.

== 23 June ==
List of shipwrecks: 25 June 1852
Ship	State	Description
Agnes	United Kingdom	The smack sprang a leak and foundered in the North Sea 6 nautical miles (11 km) off Trouphead, Aberdeenshire. Her crew survived. She was on a voyage from Thurso, Caithness to Sunderland, County Durham.
Brandon	United Kingdom	The ship ran aground on Scroby Sands, Norfolk. She was refloated on 25 June and taken in to Great Yarmouth, Norfolk.
Christian	United Kingdom	The ship was wrecked off Kennery, India with the loss of six of her seventeen crew. She was on a voyage from Newcastle upon Tyne, Northumberland to Calcutta, India.
Elizabeth	(United Kingdom of Great Britain and Ireland) New South Wales	The ship was wrecked near Bird Island, Van Diemen's Land. All on board were rescued.
Lady Ann	United Kingdom	The ship was driven ashore and sank near Staithes, Yorkshire. She was later refloated and taken in to Stockton-on-Tees, County Durham in a severely damaged condition with assistance from Conquest (United Kingdom).
Trusty	United Kingdom	The barque was wrecked on a reef off Cape Gaspé, Province of Canada, British North America with the loss of eighteen lives. She was on a voyage from Scarborough, Yorkshire to Quebec City, Province of Canada.

== 24 June ==
List of shipwrecks: 24 June 1852
Ship	State	Description
Lady Ann	United Kingdom	The ship struck a sunken rock and sank near "Rocliff", Yorkshire.
Pilgrim	United Kingdom	The ship was driven ashore at Lubec, Maine, United States. She was on a voyage from New York, United States to Saint John, New Brunswick. She had been refloated by 5 July and towed in to New York.

== 25 June ==
List of shipwrecks: 25 June 1852
Ship	State	Description
Achilles	United Kingdom	The barque was driven ashore at Waterford. Her crew were rescued. She was on a voyage from Sunderland, County Durham to New Ross, County Wexford. She was refloated on 5 July and towed in to Waterford.
Dapper	United Kingdom	The ship was holed by an anchor and sank in the River Tamar at New Quay, Devon.
Morley	United Kingdom	The ship was wrecked at Broad Cove, Newfoundland, British North America. She was on a voyage from Saint Andrews, New Brunswick, British North America to London.

== 26 June ==
List of shipwrecks: 26 June 1852
Ship	State	Description
Maria	United Kingdom	The ship ran aground off the Isle of Wight. She was on a voyage from Southampton, Hampshire to Bristol, Gloucestershire.
Whim	United Kingdom	The schooner was driven ashore in Cloughy Bay. She was on a voyage from Liverpool, Lancashire to Newcastle upon Tyne, Northumberland.

== 28 June ==
List of shipwrecks: 28 June 1852
Ship	State	Description
Conte Zichy	Austrian Empire	The brig was wrecked near "Carnamie", Brazil. Her crew were rescued. She was on a voyage from Rio de Janeiro to Bahia.
Hope	United Kingdom	The sloop ran aground and sank off St. Ives, Cornwall. Her four crew were rescued by a pilot boat.
Reciprocity	United Kingdom	The ship was destroyed by fire in the Atlantic Ocean. Her 27 crew survived. Eighteen were rescued by a French schooner. She was on a voyage from Mobile, Alabama, United States to Liverpool, Lancashire.
Stockholm	Sweden	The ship was run aground off Klädesholmen and was consequently beached on Flatholmen. She was refloated and taken in to Trollhättan.

== 29 June ==
List of shipwrecks: 29 June 1852
Ship	State	Description
Ann	United Kingdom	The ship was run aground and was damaged on the Bahama Bank, in the Irish Sea. She was on a voyage from Ardrossan, Ayrshire to Liverpool, Lancashire. She was refloated and put in to Whitehaven, Cumberland.
Cornwallis	United States	The barque was wrecked at Humboldt City, California.
Britain	United Kingdom	The ship ran aground and sank off West Quoddy Head, Maine, United States. Her crew were rescued. She was on a voyage from Cumberland, Nova Scotia, British North America to Boston, Massachusetts, United States.
Juanita	Spain	The ship sprang a leak and foundered in the Atlantic Ocean 35 leagues (105 nautical miles (194 km) off Lanzarote, Canary Islands. Her crew were rescued. She was on a voyage from Barcelona to Havana, Cuba. She was subsequently taken in to San Juan de la Rambla, Santa Cruz de Tenerife in a waterlogged condition and beached.
Orinoco	United States	The ship was wrecked on Wedge Island, Nova Scotia. She was on a voyage from Boston, Massachusetts to Miramichi, New Brunswick, British North America.
Warrior	United Kingdom	The ship was driven ashore at Queenstown, County Cork. She was on a voyage from Mauritius to Bristol, Gloucestershire. She was refloated with the aid of some Royal Navy ships and taken in to Queenstown.

== 30 June ==
List of shipwrecks: 30 June 1852
Ship	State	Description
Anne	Denmark	The ship was wrecked on Little Bahama, Bahamas. She was on a voyage from Matanzas, Cuba to Copenhagen.
Caroline Alice	United Kingdom	The ship struck a sunken rock and was wrecked in the Sound of Kyleakin. She was on a voyage from Liverpool, Lancashire to Hammerfest, Norway.
Diana	United Kingdom	The ship was driven ashore on Seskar, Russia. All on board were rescued. She was on a voyage from Lisbon, Portugal to Kronstadt, Russia.
Hanne	Denmark	The ship was wrecked on Little Bahama Bank, in the Bahamas. She was on a voyage from Matanzas, Cuba to Copenhagen.
Secret	United Kingdom	The ship ran aground on Seskar, Russia. She was on a voyage from Sunderland, County Durham to Kronstadt, Russia. She was refloated, and arrived at Kronstadt the next day.

== Unknown date ==
List of shipwrecks: Unknown date in June 1852
Ship	State	Description
Bangalore	United Kingdom	The ship ran aground on the Goodwin Sands, Kent before 9 June. She was on a voyage from London to Australia. She was refloated and put in to Plymouth, Devon.
Harmony	United Kingdom	The ship was holed by her anchor and sank at Drogheda, County Louth before 21 June.
Henry	(United Kingdom of Great Britain and Ireland) New Zealand	The ship was wrecked near Pourua with the loss of all hands. She was on a voyage from Pourua to Wellington.
Jane	United Kingdom	The ship was abandoned before 5 June. Her crew were rescued. She was on a voyage from Laguna to Liverpool, Lancashire.
Jeune Pierre	(flag) France	The ship was wrecked on the Île d'Oléron, Charente-Maritime. Her crew were rescued. She was on a voyage from Swansea, Glamorgan, United Kingdom to Bordeaux, Gironde.
Lady Peel	(United Kingdom of Great Britain and Ireland) New South Wales	The barque was driven ashore between Shortland's Bluff and Swan Point. She was on a voyage from Newcastle to Sydney. She was refloated and taken in to Sydney, where she arrived on 8 June.
Lawsons	United Kingdom	The ship was driven ashore at Dagerort, Russia. She was on a voyage from Liverpool to Kronstadt, Russia. She was refloated and completed her voyage, arriving on 19 June.
Levant	United Kingdom	The ship was wrecked in the Mozambique Channel. Her crew were rescued. She was on a voyage from Mauritius to the Clyde.
Lucy Anne	(United Kingdom of Great Britain and Ireland) New South Wales	The ship ran aground on the Royal George Bank. She was on a voyage from Sydney to Melbourne, Victoria.
Marie Rosalie	France	The ship was driven ashore on Saaremaa, Russia. She was on a voyage from Havre de Grâce, Seine-Inférieure to Saint Petersburg, Russia. She was refloated and taken in to Reval, Russia, arriving on 27 June.
Nerio	United Kingdom	The ship was abandoned in the Atlantic Ocean before 4 June. Eighty people were rescued by Thames United Kingdom). Nerio was on a voyage from Antwerp, Belgium to Montreal, Province of Canada, British North America.
Panavala Manjanka	Flag unknown	The ship was driven ashore and wrecked at Lagos, Africa before 15 June.
Petrel	United Kingdom	The ship was driven ashore on Gotland, Sweden before 29 June. Se was on a voyage from Gävle, Sweden to Gosport, Hampshire. She was refloated and put in to Helsingør, Denmark.
Spitzbergen	United Kingdom	The whaler was wrecked in Greenland waters. Her crew were rescued.
