= List of shipwrecks in April 1858 =

The list of shipwrecks in April 1858 includes ships sunk, foundered, wrecked, grounded, or otherwise lost during April 1858.

== 1 April ==
List of shipwrecks: 1 April 1858
Ship	State	Description
Isabella	United Kingdom	The schooner was driven ashore and damaged at Sunderland, County Durham. She was on a voyage from Arbroath, Forfarshire, to Sunderland. She was later refloated and taken in to the River Tyne for repairs.
Juneatta	United Kingdom	The ship was discovered abandoned 40 nautical miles (74 km) off Maranhão, Brazil, having run aground on the Lemcoes Grundes and been abandoned by her crew. She was on a voyage from Liverpool, Lancashire, to Maranhão. Juneatta was taken in to Maranhão.
Kingfisher	United Kingdom	The schooner was driven ashore at the mouth of the River Tees. She was on a voyage from Newcastle upon Tyne, Northumberland, to Skinningrove, Yorkshire.
Robert Hudson	United Kingdom	The coaster foundered in the North Sea off the coast of Yorkshire with the loss of all five crew.
Rosedale	United Kingdom	The steamship ran aground on the Longscar Rocks, off the coast of County Durham and was wrecked. All on board were rescued by the West Hartlepool Lifeboat. She was on a voyage from London to Newcastle upon Tyne, Northumberland.
Steerwell	United Kingdom	The schooner sank at Staithes, Yorkshire. She was on a voyage from South Shields, County Durham, to Rosedale. She was later refloated and towed in to Whitby, Yorkshire, where she arrived on 15 April in a severely damaged condition.
Thetis	United Kingdom	The schooner ran aground and sank at Rock Ferry, Cheshire. She was on a voyage from Runcorn, Cheshire, to Waterford.

== 2 April ==
List of shipwrecks: 2 April 1858
Ship	State	Description
Friedrich	Stettin	The ship was driven ashore at Memel, Prussia.
Hellespont	United Kingdom	The ship was wrecked in Sandy Bay, Bahamas. She was on a voyage from Havana, Cuba, to Falmouth, Cornwall.
Laing	United Kingdom	The brig ran aground at Middlesbrough, Yorkshire. She was on a voyage from Middlesbrough to Antwerp, Belgium. She was refloated and resumed her voyage with two extra hands.
Mead	United Kingdom	The ship was driven ashore at Memel. She was on a voyage from Copenhagen, Denmark, to Memel.
Sultan	United States	The steamship was destroyed by fire near Ste. Genevieve, Missouri with the loss of fifteen to twenty lives.
Tulloch Castle	United Kingdom	The barque ran aground on the Bull Sand. She was on a voyage from Sunderland, County Durham, to Aden. She was refloated and put in to Ramsgate in a leaky condition.
Two Sarahs	United Kingdom	The sloop was driven ashore at Par, Cornwall. She was on a voyage from Runcorn, Cheshire, to Penzance, Cornwall. She was refloated and taken in to "Polkenan" in a leaky condition.
William	United Kingdom	The ship was driven ashore at Wijk aan Zee, North Holland, Netherlands. Her crew were rescued.

== 3 April ==
List of shipwrecks: 3 April 1858
Ship	State	Description
Ellen Callanan	United Kingdom	The brigantine was driven ashore and wrecked the Cow and Calf Rock, off Roches Point, County Cork. Her crew were rescued. She was on a voyage from Cork to Newport, Monmouthshire.
Excavator	United Kingdom	The schooner foundered in the North Sea. Her crew were rescued by Oscar (Norway). Excavator was on a voyage from Newcastle upon Tyne, Northumberland, to Amsterdam, North Holland, Netherlands and/or the Elbe.
Lively	United Kingdom	The brig was abandoned in the Atlantic Ocean. Her crew were rescued by Mountaineer (United Kingdom). Lively was on a voyage from Sunderland, County Durham, to Newhaven, Connecticut, United States.
Sinope	United Kingdom	The ship was driven ashore between Kingsdown and the South Foreland, Kent. She was on a voyage from Sunderland, County Durham, to Genoa, Kingdom of Sardinia. She was refloated the next day and taken in to Dover, Kent.
Sir Alexander	United Kingdom	The ship ran aground on the Goodwin Sands, Kent. She was on a voyage from South Shields, County Durham, to Havre de Grâce, Seine-Inférieure, France. She was refloated and taken in to Ramsgate, Kent, in a severely leaky condition.
Stockton Packet	United Kingdom	The brig was driven ashore at Spurn Point, Yorkshire. She was on a voyage from Middlesbrough, Yorkshire, to Rotterdam, South Holland, Netherlands.
Tower	United Kingdom	The schooner foundered in the North Sea off Sylt, Duchy of Holstein. Her crew were rescued. She was on a voyage from South Shields to Stettin.
Winslow	France	The full-rigged ship was driven ashore and severely damaged at Havre de Grâce, Seine-Inférieure. She was on a voyage from Calcutta, India, to Antwerp, Belgium. Winslow was refloated and taken in to Havre de Grâce.

== 4 April ==
List of shipwrecks: 4 April 1858
Ship	State	Description
Alchymist	United Kingdom	The ship was wrecked on the Byzambon Reef, off the Laccadive Islands. Her crew survived. She was on a voyage from Liverpool, Lancashire, to Bombay, India.
Anne and Betsey	United Kingdom	The ship was run into by a schooner and was beached at "Marlewick", Pembrokeshire. She was on a voyage from Milford Haven, Pembrokeshire, to Newport, Monmouthshire.
Courser	United States	The medium clipper ran aground on the Pratas Shoal and was abandoned with the ultimate loss of two of her crew. She was on a voyage from Foochow, China to New York.
Gipsey	United Kingdom	The smack was driven ashore at "Marlewick".
Jennette	United Kingdom	The schooner was run down and sunk in the Elbe by the steamship Swallow (United Kingdom). Her crew were rescued. She was on a voyage from Portmadoc, Caernarfonshire, to Hamburg.
Moskowa	France	The schooner was driven ashore and wrecked 3 leagues (9 nautical miles (17 km)) from Boulogne, Pas-de-Calais with the loss of all hands. She was on a voyage from Liverpool, Lancashire, United Kingdom, to Dunkirk, Nord.
Petrea	United States	The barque was driven ashore at West Wittering, Sussex, United Kingdom. Her passengers were landed. She was on a voyage from Havre de Grâce, Seine-Inférieure, France to New York.

== 5 April ==
List of shipwrecks: 5 April 1858
Ship	State	Description
Courser	United States	The ship was wrecked on the Pratas Shoal, in the South China Sea. Her crew survived. She was on a voyage from Foo Chow Foo, China, to New York.
Enigheden	Norway	The schooner was driven ashore at Peterhead, Aberdeenshire, United Kingdom. She was on a voyage from Sandefjord to Peterhead. She was refloated the next day and taken in to Peterhead.
Mary	United Kingdom	The ship was wrecked on the North Bull, in the Irish Sea off the coast of County Louth. Her crew were rescued. She was on a voyage from Drogheda, County Louth, to Liverpool, Lancashire.
Merlian	United States	The full-rigged ship was abandoned in the Atlantic Ocean. Four crew were rescued by the full-rigged ship Tarquin (United States).
Morning Light	United Kingdom	The ship was driven ashore at Seacombe, Cheshire. She was on a voyage from Melbourne, Melbourne to Liverpool. She was refloated with the assistance of two tugs.
Ocean Queen	United Kingdom	The brig was driven ashore at Pillau, Prussia. Her crew were rescued by rocket apparatus and the Pillau Lifeboat. She was on a voyage from Sunderland, County Durham, to Pillau. Ocean Queen was consequently condemned.
Rock	United Kingdom	The ship was driven ashore at "Drumnacraig", County Londonderry. She was on a voyage from Workington, Cumberland, to Ramelton, County Donegal.
Suez	(Ottoman Empire) Egypt	The steamship was wrecked at Jaffa, Ottoman Syria with the loss of 25 of the 54 people on board. She was on a voyage from Alexandria to Smyrna, Ottoman Empire.

== 6 April ==
List of shipwrecks: 6 April 1858
Ship	State	Description
Bee	United Kingdom	The schooner was driven ashore at Aberdovey, Cardiganshire. She was on a voyage from Drogheda, County Louth, to Aberdovey.
Caroline	United Kingdom	The barque was driven ashore at Lowestoft, Suffolk. Her crew were rescued. She was on a voyage from Sunderland, County Durham, to London
Catherine	United Kingdom	The ship foundered in the Bristol Channel off Milford Haven, Pembrokeshire. Her three crew took to a boat. They were rescued the next day by Majestic (United Kingdom). Catherine was on a voyage from Padstow, Cornwall, to Solva, Pembrokeshire.
Clinton	United Kingdom	The ship was driven ashore at Memel, Prussia. Her crew were rescued.
Elizabeth	United Kingdom	The ship struck the Black Rock and was damaged. She was on a voyage from Moulmein, Burma, to Liverpool, Lancashire. She was taken in to the Currick Roads.
Exchange	United Kingdom	The ship was driven ashore and wrecked at Wicklow Head, County Wicklow. Her twelve crew survived. She was on a voyage from Liverpool, Lancashire, to Newport, Monmouthshire.
Express	United States	The ship was driven ashore and wrecked at Wicklow Head with the loss of two of her crew. She was on a voyage from Liverpool to Newport.
Fanny	United Kingdom	The schooner was driven ashore and severely damaged at Dublin.
Fortuna	United Kingdom	The brig was abandoned off Kinsale, County Cork. Her crew were rescued. She was on a voyage from Liverpool to Montevideo, Uruguay.
Gebroeders Zelling	Netherlands	The galiot was driven ashore and wrecked in Dundalk Bay. Her five crew were rescued. She was on a voyage from Nantes, Loire-Inférieure, France to Douglas, Isle of Man.
Jessie, or Jessy	United Kingdom	The schooner was driven ashore at Whitehouse, County Antrim. She was on a voyage from Maryport, Cumberland, to Newry, County Down.
Pearl	United Kingdom	The schooner was driven ashore at Gorey, County Wexford. Her crew were rescued. She was on a voyage from Liverpool to Cork.

== 7 April ==
List of shipwrecks: 7 April 1858
Ship	State	Description
Amoyen	Netherlands	The ship ran aground on the Girdler Sand. She was on a voyage from Hamburg to Swansea, Glamorgan, United Kingdom.
Anda	United Kingdom	The brig was driven ashore and wrecked at Aldbrough, Yorkshire. Her crew were rescued by the Coast Guard using Carte's rocket apparatus. She was on a voyage from South Shields, County Durham, to Hamburg.
Arctic	United Kingdom	The schooner was driven ashore at Kilmichael, County Cork. Her crew were rescued. She was on a voyage from Figueira da Foz, Portugal, to Liverpool, Lancashire.
Minna	United Kingdom	The ship was driven ashore and wrecked on Donan's Island, County Sligo.
Ramsey	United Kingdom	The schooner was driven ashore at Warrenpoint, County Down.
Sylvia	United Kingdom	The barque was driven ashore and wrecked at Newcastle, County Down, with the loss of all nine crew. She was on a voyage from Liverpool to Saint John's, Newfoundland.

== 8 April ==
List of shipwrecks: 8 April 1858
Ship	State	Description
Aimable Elise	France	The lugger foundered in the Irish Sea off Blackwater, County Wexford, United Kingdom. She was on a voyage from Swansea, Glamorgan, United Kingdom, to the Charente.
Chandos	United Kingdom	The schooner ran aground and capsized in the River Usk. She was righted and taken in to Newport, Monmouthshire.
Clementina	France	The schooner ran aground on the Surcum Sand. She was refloated and put in to Grimsby, Lincolnshire, United Kingdom.
Coburg	United Kingdom	The brig was wrecked at Bridlington, Yorkshire. Her crew were rescued by the Bridlington Lifeboat. She was on a voyage from the River Tyne to Rouen, Seine-Inférieure, France.
Faders Minde	Denmark	The full-rigged ship was driven ashore at Almería, Spain. Her crew were rescued.
Mary Stoddart	United Kingdom	The barque was driven ashore and wrecked at Dundalk, County Louth. Her thirteen crew were rescued, but nine would-be rescuers, including four crew of the paddle steamer Pride of Erin (United Kingdom) were drowned. Mary Stoddart was on a voyage from Alexandria, Egypt, to the Clyde.
Maurice	United Kingdom	The ship was driven ashore at Scarborough, Yorkshire. Her crew were rescued by the Scarborough Lifeboat. She was on a voyage from South Shields, County Durham, to Dieppe, Seine-Inférieure, France.
Minerva	United Kingdom	The ship was driven ashore and wrecked at Whitby, Yorkshire. Her crew were rescued. She was on a voyage from South Shields to Dieppe. Minerva was refloated on 12 April and taken in to Scarborough.
Venilia	United Kingdom	The brigantine ran aground on the Whitehouse Bank, in Belfast Lough. She was on a voyage from Rouen, Seine-Inférieure, to Liverpool, Lancashire.
Wiesser	Netherlands	The ship was driven ashore at Baldoyle, County Dublin, United Kingdom. She was on a voyage from New Orleans, Louisiana, to Liverpool.

== 9 April ==
List of shipwrecks: 9 April 1858
Ship	State	Description
Bridges	United Kingdom	The schooner was driven ashore 1 nautical mile (1.9 km) south of Laytown, County Meath. Her crew were rescued. She was on a voyage from Dunkirk, Nord to Drogheda, County Louth. Also reported as being on a voyage from Falmouth, Cornwall, to Liverpool, Lancashire.
Clementina	United Kingdom	The ship ran aground on the "Barcum Sand", in the North Sea. She was refloated and put in to Grimsby, Lincolnshire.
Dido	United Kingdom	The brig foundered in the South China Sea with the loss of all but one of her crew. The survivor was rescued by Enchanter (United Kingdom). Dido was on a voyage from Rangoon, Burma, to Penang, Malaya.
Endeavour	United Kingdom	The sloop was driven ashore near Cooly Point, County Louth, with the loss of all hands.
Fortunate	United Kingdom	The ship foundered off Kilkeel, County Down, with the loss of all hands. She was on a voyage from Liverpool, Lancashire, to Montevideo, Uruguay.
Mary Stoddart	United Kingdom	The barque was wrecked at Dundalk, County Louth, with the loss of several of her crew. Survivors were rescued by the steamship Pride of Erin (United Kingdom) which also lost several of her crew effecting the rescued.
Romance	United Kingdom	The brig was abandoned in the Atlantic Ocean. Her crew were rescued by the schooner Fortuna (Denmark). Romance was on a voyage from South Shields, County Durham, to Alicante, Spain.
Trident	Spain	The brig was driven ashore and wrecked at Kilkeel with the loss of eight of her eleven crew. She was on a voyage from Liverpool to Barcelona.
Trident	United Kingdom	The ship was wrecked on Lundy Island, Devon, with the loss of a crew member. She was on a voyage from Cardiff, Glamorgan, to Plymouth, Devon.

== 10 April ==
List of shipwrecks: 10 April 1858
Ship	State	Description
Mary and Caroline	United Kingdom	The brig was abandoned in the Atlantic Ocean. Her crew were rescued by Malanie (France). Mary and Caroline was on a voyage from Troon, Ayrshire, to Smyrna, Ottoman Empire. She foundered on 12 April.

== 11 April ==
List of shipwrecks: 11 April 1858
Ship	State	Description
Forest Queen	United Kingdom	The ship was abandoned in the Atlantic Ocean. She was on a voyage from Newport, Monmouthshire, to Rio de Janeiro, Brazil. She was subsequently discovered by Louisa (United Kingdom). A skeleton crew was put aboard and she was taken in to Queenstown, where she arrived on 23 April.
Jean MacCrea	United Kingdom	The ship ran aground at Stornoway, Isle of Lewis, Outer Hebrides. She was on a voyage from Liverpool, Lancashire, to Newcastle upon Tyne, Northumberland. She was refloated and taken in to Stornoway in a leaky condition. Subsequently repaired.

== 12 April ==
List of shipwrecks: 12 April 1858
Ship	State	Description
Leopold	Belgium	The barque was wrecked on Grand Jason Island, Falkland Islands with the loss of eight of her twenty crew. She was on a voyage from Swansea, Glamorgan, United Kingdom, to Callao, Peru. Only one of the twelve survivors of the wreck survived to be rescued three weeks later.
Rebecca Craggs	United Kingdom	The ship ran aground in the Elbe. She was on a voyage from Middlesbrough, Yorkshire, to Hamburg.
Sarah	United Kingdom	The barque was driven ashore near Pensacola, Florida, United States. She was refloated.

== 14 April ==
List of shipwrecks: 14 April 1858
Ship	State	Description
Neptune	United Kingdom	The sloop foundered in the Irish Sea off South Stack, Anglesey. Her three crew were rescued by the steamship Balbec (United Kingdom). Neptune was on a voyage from Llanelly, Glamorgan, to Amlwch, Anglesey.
Nymph	United Kingdom	The schooner was wrecked at Irvine, Ayrshire. Her crew were rescued.
Port Glasgow	(United Kingdom of Great Britain and Ireland) New Zealand	The schooner was wrecked at Fitzroy Bay, just south of the entrance to Wellington Harbour. She was carrying grain from Port Cooper to Wellington. All the crew perished, but some of the cargo was saved.
Speculation	Danzig	The schooner was driven ashore at Hela, Prussia. She was on a voyage from Danzig to Dundee, Forfarshire, United Kingdom.

== 15 April ==
List of shipwrecks: 15 April 1858
Ship	State	Description
Breeze	United Kingdom	The ship was driven ashore and wrecked at Ballyquentin Point, County Down. She was on a voyage from Liverpool, Lancashire, to Padstow, Cornwall.
Ernestine	United Kingdom	The steamship was run down by the barque Thomas ( Danzig) and sank off Great Yarmouth, Norfolk, with the loss of three of her eighteen crew. Survivors were rescued by the brig British Empire (United Kingdom). Ernestine was on a voyage from Dundee, Forfarshire, to Dieppe, Seine-Inférieure, France.

== 17 April ==
List of shipwrecks: 17 April 1858
Ship	State	Description
Mayflower	United Kingdom	The ship was driven onto a rock and severely damaged at Port Dinorwic, Caernarfonshire. She was on a voyage from Port Dinorwic to Liverpool, Lancashire.
Maria Francesca	Austrian Empire	The barque was driven ashore at Büyükdere, Ottoman Empire. She was on a voyage from Odesa to Queenstown, County Cork, United Kingdom.
Zephyr	United Kingdom	The brig ran aground off Saint Croix, Virgin Islands. She was on a voyage from Trinidad to the Clyde. She was refloated on 21 April and taken in to Frederiksted.

== 18 April ==
List of shipwrecks: 18 April 1858
Ship	State	Description
Amphitrite	United Kingdom	The ship sank off Flamborough Head, Yorkshire. Her crew were rescued. She was on a voyage from South Shields, County Durham, to London.
Prince Albert	United Kingdom	The schooner ran aground on the Schaar, off the coast of Zeeland, Netherlands.

== 19 April ==
List of shipwrecks: 19 April 1858
Ship	State	Description
Dodo	United Kingdom	The steamship ran aground on the Ooster Bank, in the North Sea off the Dutch coast. She was on a voyage from Liverpool, Lancashire, to Rotterdam, South Holland. She was later refloated and taken in to Brouwershaven, Zeeland, Netherlands

== 20 April ==
List of shipwrecks: 20 April 1858
Ship	State	Description
Bore	United Kingdom	The ship ran aground at Dingle, County Kerry. She was on a voyage from Dingle to Cardiff, Glamorgan. She was refloated but grounded again. Bore was refloated on 23 April and take in to Dingle in a severely damaged condition.
Zenobia	United States	The full-rigged ship was wrecked off Point Bonita, California.

== 22 April ==
List of shipwrecks: 22 April 1858
Ship	State	Description
James Baines	United Kingdom	The extreme clipper burned to the waterline in the Huskisson Dock at Liverpool, Lancashire, England. She was declared a constructive total loss and was subsequently used as a coal hulk.
Julie	Rostock	The ship was driven ashore between Dragør and Kastrup, Denmark. She was on a voyage from Rostock to Leith, Lothian, United Kingdom. She was refloated the next day and resumed her voyage.
Ocean Spray	United States	The steamboat was destroyed by fire in the Mississippi River 5 nautical miles (9.3 km) from St. Louis, Missouri, with the loss of about twenty lives.

== 23 April ==
List of shipwrecks: 23 April 1858
Ship	State	Description
Chesterholme	United Kingdom	The full-rigged ship was wrecked on the Portlock Reef, in the Torres Straits. Her 33 crew were rescued by the full-rigged ship Hastings (United Kingdom). Chesterholme was on a voyage from Hobart, Tasmania, to Calcutta, India.
Jane, and Susan	United Kingdom	Jane was in collision with the schooner Susan in the Bristol Channel. Both vessels foundered. Their crew were rescued by a schooner.
Precursor	United Kingdom	The ship was holed by ice and sank 20 nautical miles (37 km) south of Hogland, Russia. Her crew were rescued. She was on a voyage from Sunderland, County Durham, to Kronstadt, Russia.
Sea Horse	United Kingdom	The ship was wrecked near the Sand Heads, India. Her crew were rescued. She was on a voyage from Calcutta, India, to Liverpool.

== 24 April ==
List of shipwrecks: 24 April 1858
Ship	State	Description
Augusta	Belgium	The ship caught fire and was scuttled at Saint-Nazaire, Loire-Inférieure, France.
Breakwater	United Kingdom	The brig ran aground on Scroby Sands, Norfolk. She was refloated and resumed her voyage.

== 25 April ==
List of shipwrecks: 25 April 1858
Ship	State	Description
Jessie	United Kingdom	The brig was in collision with another vessel and sank off the Dudgeon Sandbank, in the North Sea with the loss of four of her seven crew. Survivors were rescued by the brig Ann (United Kingdom).
Mary Ann	United Kingdom	The schooner was driven ashore and wrecked at Portstewart, Wigtownshire.

== 26 April ==
List of shipwrecks: 26 April 1858
Ship	State	Description
Axe	United Kingdom	The ship was driven ashore and wrecked on the Agger Strand, Denmark. Her crew survived. She was on a voyage from London to Königsberg, Prussia. Axe was refloated on 26 April.
Frouke Meminga	Kingdom of Hanover	The ship was lost on the Memment, in the North Sea. she was on a voyage from Newcastle upon Tyne, Northumberland, United Kingdom, to Leer.
Henry	United Kingdom	The ship ran aground on the Goodwin Sands, Kent. She was on a voyage from Hartlepool, County Durham, to Dover, Kent. She was refloated with the assistance of a lugger and resumed her voyage in a leaky condition.
Janette and Bertha	Hamburg	The ship ran aground off Caldera, Chile, and was abandoned in a sinking condition. Four of the fifteen people on board were reported missing.
Mary Ann	United Kingdom	The schooner was driven ashore and wrecked at Portstewart, Wigtownshire. She was on a voyage from Maryport, Cumberland, to Portstewart.
Sea	United Kingdom	The brig ran aground on Knoxes Rock, in the Farne Islands, Northumberland. She was on a voyage from Liverpool, Lancashire, to the River Tyne. She was refloated and taken in to Berwick upon Tweed, Northumberland, in a leaky condition.
Two Brothers	United Kingdom	The ship capsized at Ipswich, Suffolk. She was righted.
Unity	United Kingdom	The ship ran aground on the Longsand, in the North Sea off the coast of Essex. She was on a voyage from South Shields, County Durham, to Cowes, Isle of Wight. She was refloated and assisted in to Harwich, Essex.

== 27 April ==
List of shipwrecks: 27 April 1858
Ship	State	Description
Expert	United Kingdom	The schooner caught fire at Littleferry, Sutherland. She was on a voyage from Sunderland, County Durham, to Brora, Sutherland.
Sea Breeze	United Kingdom	The ship was damaged by fire at London.

== 28 April ==
List of shipwrecks: 28 April 1858
Ship	State	Description
Bellona	Belgium	The steamship ran aground at Havre de Grâce, Seine-Inférieure, France. She was on a voyage from Havre de Grâce to Constantinople, Ottoman Empire and Odesa. She was refloated and resumed her voyage.
Journeyman	United Kingdom	The schooner was abandoned in the Baltic Sea by all but her captain of her five crew. He was rescued on 30 April by the schooner Laura (United Kingdom). Journeman sank that day. She was on a voyage from Stettin to Wick, Caithness. Allegations of barratry were made.

== 29 April ==
List of shipwrecks: 29 April 1858
Ship	State	Description
Brothers	United Kingdom	The barque ran aground on the Stockholm Reef, in the Baltic Sea. She was on a voyage from Liverpool, Lancashire, to Pärnu, Russia. She was refloated and taken in to Pärnu.
Emigrant	United Kingdom	The ship ran aground on the Trois Saumons Shoal, in the Saint Lawrence River. All on board, her crew and 73 passengers, survived. She was on a voyage from Montrose, Forfarshire, to Quebec City, Province of Canada, British North America.
Emily	United Kingdom	The schooner collided with the steamship Grenada (Flag unknown), capsized and sank at Aspinwall, Republic of New Granada. Her crew were rescued. She was on a voyage from Aspinwall to Jamaica.
Havre, and Wonder	United Kingdom	The steamships were in collision in the English Channel 23 nautical miles (43 km) off the Nab Lightship ( Trinity House). Havre was on a voyage from Southampton, Hampshire, to Havre de Grâce, Seine-Inferieure, France; Wonder was making the reverse voyage. Wonder was severely damaged. She was towed in to Southampton by Havre. Subsequently towed to Northam, Hampshire, for repairs
Newton	United Kingdom	The ship was driven ashore on Saaremaa, Russia. She was on a voyage from Sunderland, County Durham, to Kronstadt, Russia. She was later refloated and completed her voyage, arriving at Kronstadt on 17 May.
William	Prussia	The ship ran aground on the Stockholm Reef. She was on a voyage from Liverpool to Pärnu. She was refloated and taken in to Pärnu.

== 30 April ==
List of shipwrecks: 30 April 1858
Ship	State	Description
Brigand, and William Campbell	United Kingdom	The barque William Campbell was in collision with the steamship Brigand and sank in the Irish Sea with the loss of seven of her crew. William Campbell was on a voyage from the Clyde to Trinidad. Brigand consequently sank with the loss of 21 of the 41 people on board. Survivors were rescued by Espoir (Belgium). Brigand was on a voyage from Swansea, Glamorgan, to Belfast, County Antrim.
Eliza	United Kingdom	The sloop ran aground on the North Bank, in Liverpool Bay. She was on a voyage from Liverpool, Lancashire, to Amlwch, Anglesey. She was refloated with assistance from the Hoylake Lifeboat and beached in a wrecked condition.
George	United Kingdom	The schooner capsized 27 nautical miles (50 km) east of the Tuskar Rock with the loss of all but one of her crew. The survivor was rescued by Brigand (United Kingdom). George was on a voyage from Liverpool, Lancashire, to "Laird's Town", on the Niger River.

== Unknown date ==
List of shipwrecks: Unknown date in April 1858
Ship	State	Description
Albert Franklin	United Kingdom	The ship foundered off the coast of Burma before 17 April. Her crew were rescued by Judge Shaw (United Kingdom). Albert Franklin was on a voyage from Calcutta, India, to a Chinese port.
Arethusa	United Kingdom	The brig foundered in the Irish Sea off the coast of County Wexford.
Edward Phelan	United Kingdom	The schooner was driven ashore at Wexford. Her crew were rescued.
Eliza Shairp	United Kingdom	The ship was wrecked on Long Island, New York, United States, before 27 April. She was on a voyage from St. Jago de Cuba, Cuba, to Swansea, Glamorgan.
Ferdinando I	Austrian Empire	The paddle steamer ran aground at the Point of Varna, Ottoman Empire, before 20 April. She had been refloated by 22 April and taken in to Varna for repairs.
Independence	United Kingdom	The paddle steamer ran aground at Kilkeel, County Down. She was on a voyage from Liverpool, Lancashire, to Dundalk, County Louth. She was refloated and taken in to Dundalk, where she arrived on 23 April in a severely leaky condition.
Iris	United Kingdom	The brigantine was driven ashore at Curracloe, County Wexford, with the loss of a crew member. Survivors were rescued by the Coast Guard using rocket apparatus. She was on a voyage from Belfast, County Antrim, to Waterford.
Jeune St Charles	United Kingdom	The ship was wrecked on the Calf of Man, Isle of Man. She was on a voyage from Pontrieux, Côtes-du-Nord to Londonderry, United Kingdom.
John Campbell	United Kingdom	The barque was abandoned in the Atlantic Ocean before 12 April. Her crew were rescued by Français (France). John Campbell was on a voyage from Sunderland, County Durham, to Alicante, Spain.
Julia	Norway	The ship was driven ashore on the Burnham Flats, Norfolk, United Kingdom. She was on a voyage from Kristiansand to Messina, Sicily. She was refloated and towed in to King's Lynn, Norfolk, on 7 April.
Juno	Hamburg	The barque was driven ashore at Dalhousie, Ceylon before 17 April.
Lablan	Hamburg	The ship was driven ashore at Dalhousie, Ceylon before 17 April.
L. C. Kelly, and Victoria	United States; United Kingdom	The schooner L. C. Kelly collided with the brig Victoria in Chesapeake Bay before 17 April. Both vessels sank, with the loss of one life. Survivors were rescued by Adriana (United States). L. C. Kelly was on a voyage from Baltimore, Maryland, to Providence, Rhode Island.
Lord Raglan	United Kingdom	The ship was presumed to have foundered in the North Sea. She was on a voyage from Newcastle upon Tyne, Northumberland, to Stettin.
Lydia	United Kingdom	The ship was driven ashore at South Foreland, Kent. She was on a voyage from Sunderland to Portsmouth, Hampshire. She was refloated.
Machtilde Cornelia	Flag unknown	The ship foundered in the South China Sea. Her crew were rescued by Whirlwind (United Kingdom). Machtilde Cornelia was on a voyage from Newcastle upon Tyne to Hong Kong.
Meliora	United Kingdom	The ship ran aground on the Cromer Rocks. She was on a voyage from Hartlepool, County Durham, to Hong Kong. She was refloated and resumed her voyage, but consequently put in to Ramsgate, Kent, in a leaky condition.
Merzanpore	India	The ship ran aground and sank at Bombay before 17 April.
Minstrel	United Kingdom	The ship was wrecked at Cape Maquary, Brazil, before 21 April. Her crew survived.
Nixon	United Kingdom	The ship sprang a leak and was abandoned in the North Sea. She was on a voyage from Newcastle upon Tyne to Copenhagen, Denmark.
Northern Light	United States	The schooner was abandoned in the Atlantic Ocean before 18 April.
Penelope	United Kingdom	The schooner was abandoned in the North Sea before 10 April.
Primoguet	France	The ship put in to Cádiz, Spain, in a sinking condition. She was on a voyage from Bordeaux, Gironde, to Mauritius and Colombo, Ceylon.
Punch	United Kingdom	The schooner was driven ashore near Carlingford, County Louth.
Rapid	United Kingdom	The ship sank in the River Ribble before 4 April. She was on a voyage from Newry, County Antrim, to Preston, Lancashire.
Rixtina	Norway	The galiot was abandoned in the Dogger Bank before 8 April. Her crew were rescued.
Semaphore	United Kingdom	The ship was driven ashore at Black Head, County Antrim. She was refloated on 22 April and taken in to Belfast, County Antrim flooded at the bow.
Singapore	Hamburg	The ship was driven ashore at Dalhousie, Ceylon.
Squire	United Kingdom	The full-rigged ship was abandoned in the Indian Ocean before 15 April.
Victor	United States	The brig was abandoned in the Atlantic Ocean. Her crew were rescued. She was on a voyage from Callao, Peru, to Dunkirk, Nord.
