= Henri (surname) =

Henri is a surname. Notable people with the surname include:

- Louie Henri (1864–1947), English singer and actress
- Robert Henri (1865–1929), American painter and teacher
- Victor Henri (1872–1940), French physical chemist and physiologist

== See also ==
- Henry (surname)
