= Henri (ship) =

Australian brig

Coordinates: 33.085°S 151.662°E

History

France
- Name: Henri
- Fate: Wrecked on 22 June 1852

General characteristics
- Class & type: Full-rigged whaler
- Tons burthen: 364 burthen tons

Henri was a 364 burthen ton brig that was wrecked upon Reids Mistake, near the entrance to Lake Macquarie, New South Wales, Australia.

Registered in Le Havre, France and owned by French owners, she arrived in Sydney from the Navigator Islands (Samoa) on 8 May 1852. Leaving Sydney in ballast on 8 June, she was caught in bad weather being blown far north and finally arrived off Newcastle on 22 June. Her captain L. Lallier, requested that she return to Sydney for immediate travel to the South Sea Islands.

== Fate ==
While sailing south from Newcastle she was caught in a gale and was wrecked on Reids Mistake, at the entrance to Lake Macquarie on 22 June. One sailor was lost and the wreck was sold by auction.
