= French Romanesque architecture =

Medieval architectural style

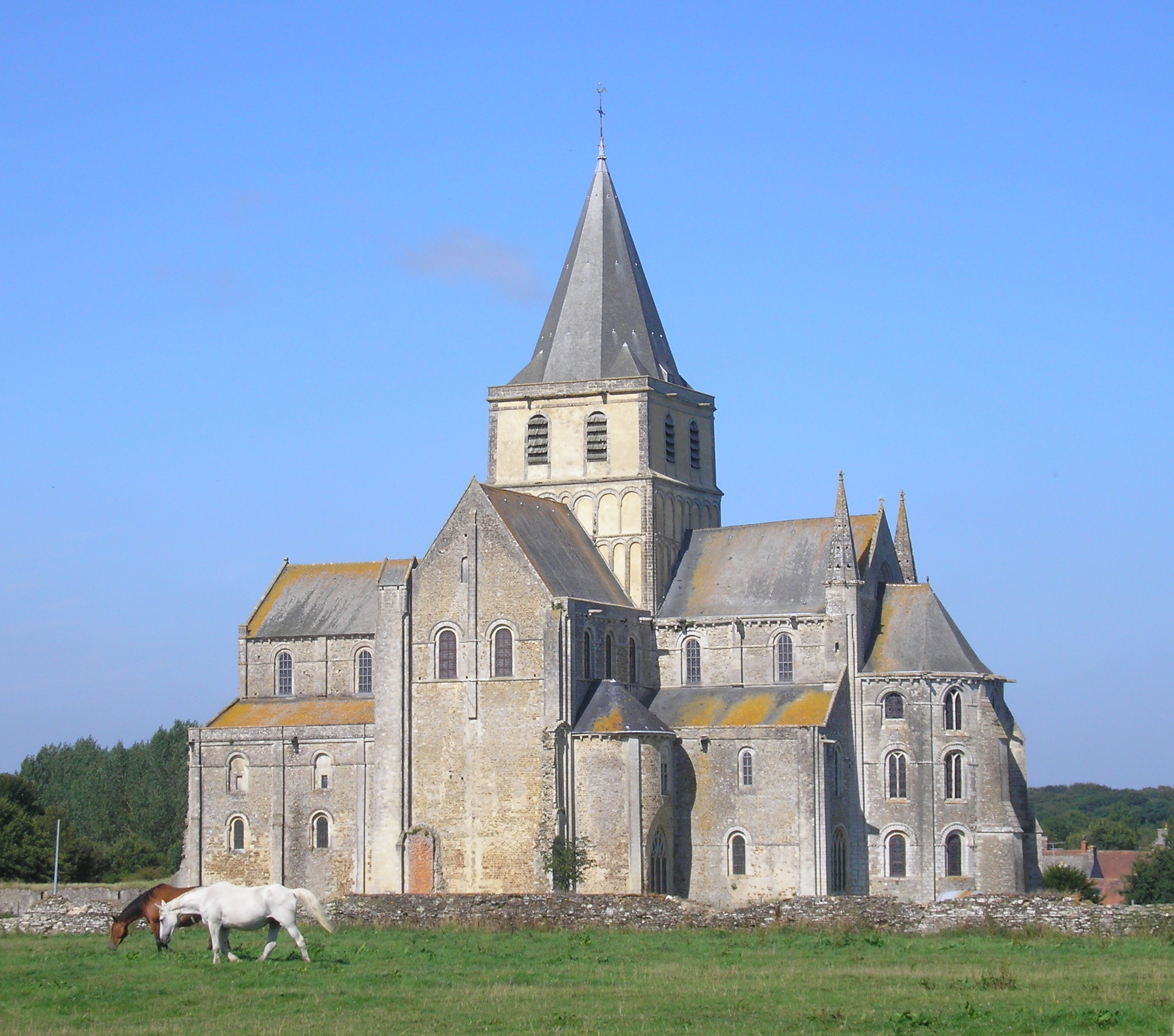
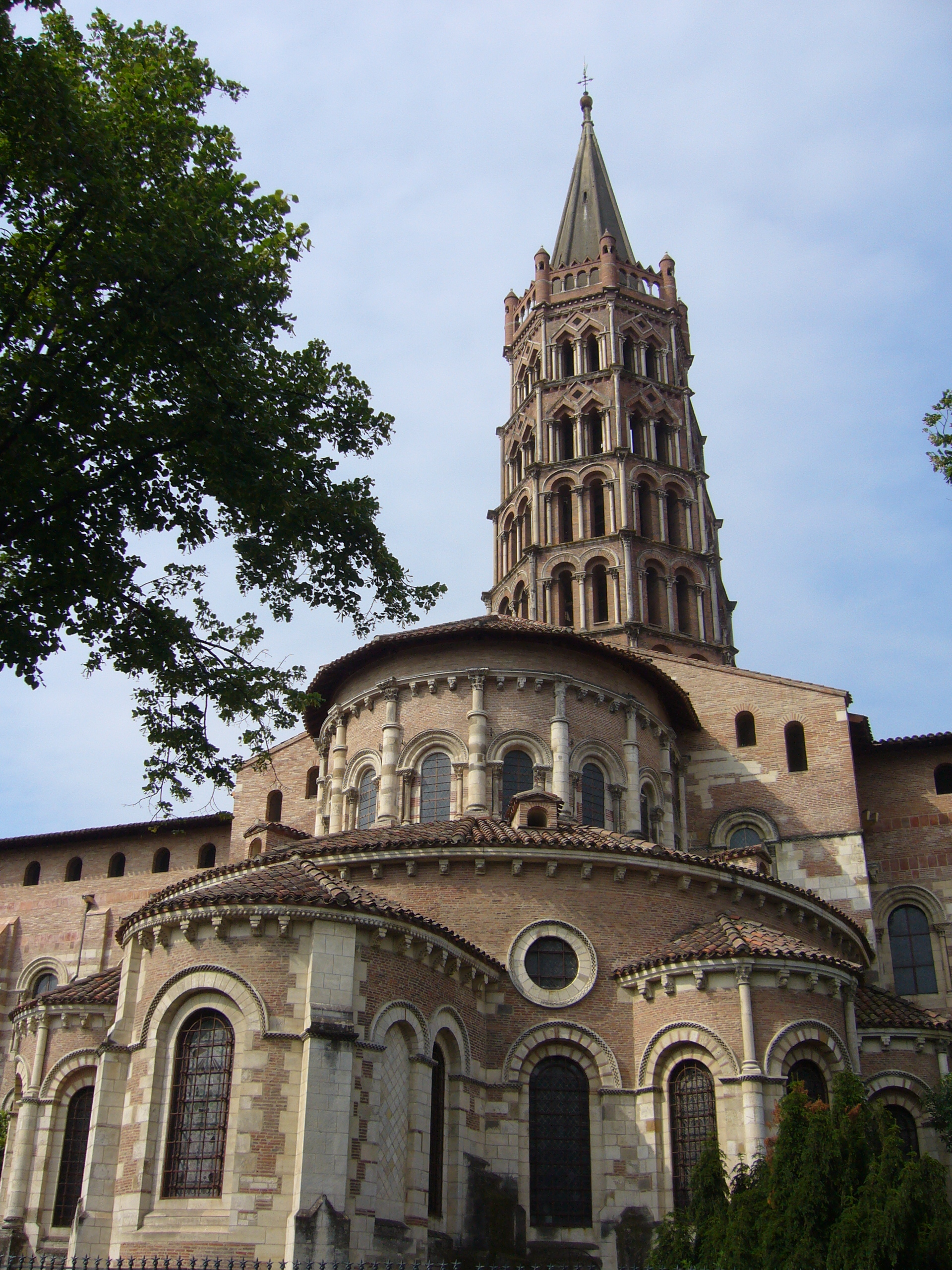
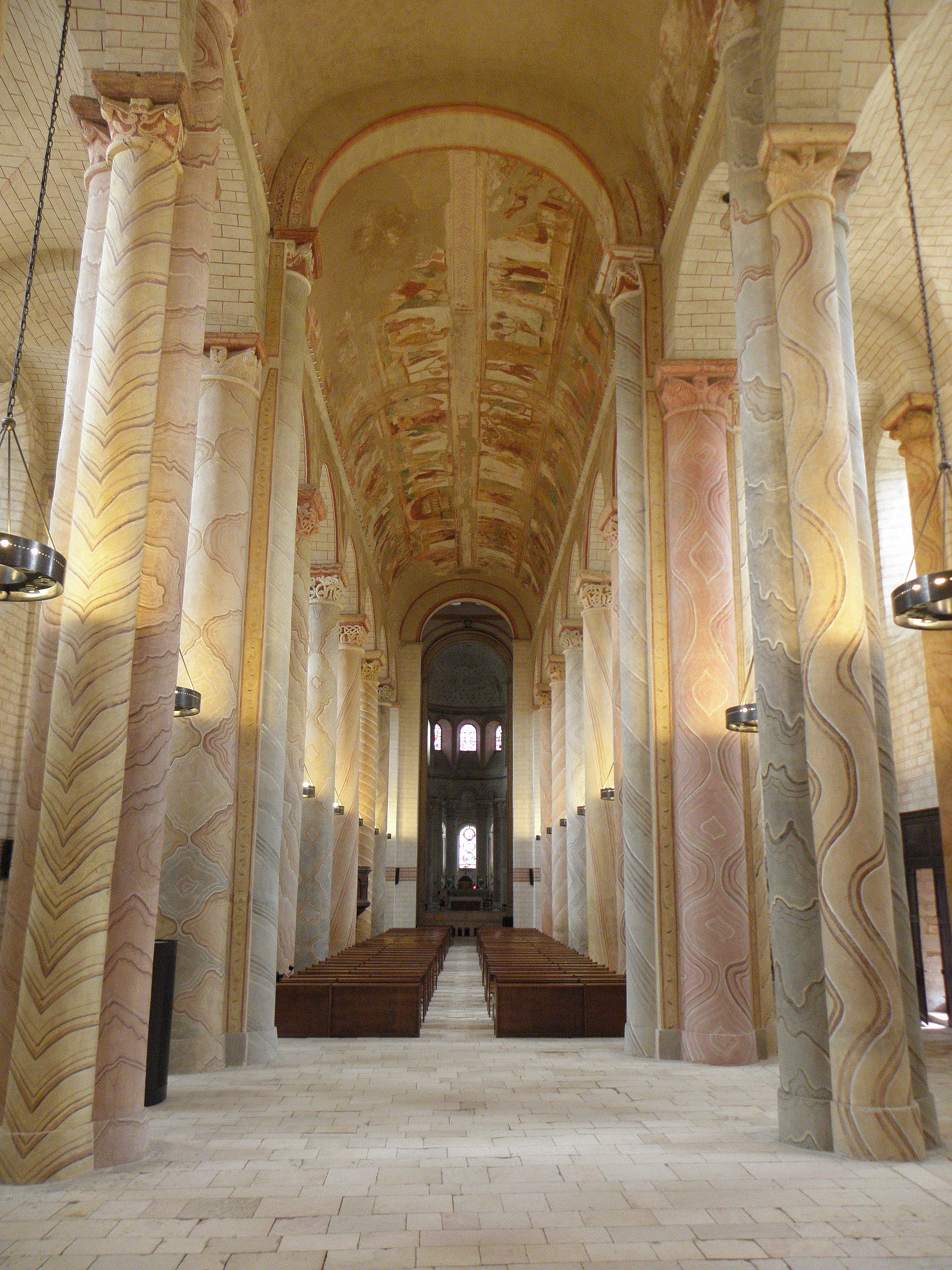
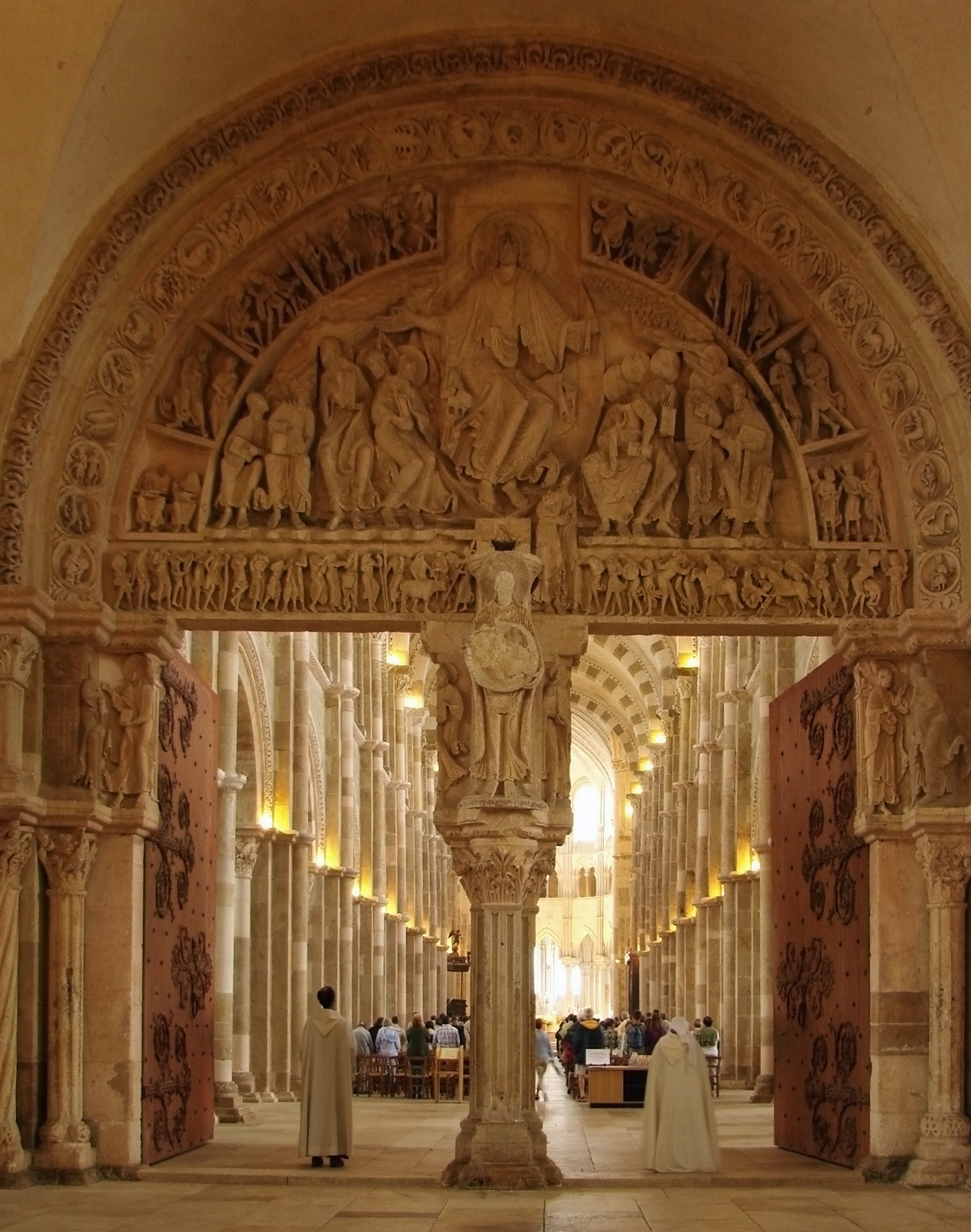
- Top : Benedictine Abbey of Saint-Vigor de Cerisy (1080–1085); Center left: Tower of Basilica of Saint-Sernin, Toulouse: Center right: Nave and painted columns of Abbey Church of Saint-Savin-sur-Gartempe in Poitou; Bottom: The central Typanum at Vézelay Abbey
- Years active: End of the 10th to the mid-12th century
- Location: France

Romanesque architecture appeared in France at the end of the 10th century, with the development of feudal society and the rise and spread of monastic orders, particularly the Benedictines, who built many important abbeys and monasteries in the style. It continued to dominate religious architecture until the appearance of French Gothic architecture in the Île-de-France between about 1140 and 1150.

Distinctive features of French Romanesque architecture include thick walls with small windows, rounded arches; a long nave covered with barrel vaults; and the use of the groin vault at the intersection of two barrel vaults, all supported by massive columns; a level of tribunes above the galleries on the ground floor, and small windows above the tribunes; and rows of exterior buttresses supporting the walls. Churches commonly had a cupola over the transept, supported by four adjoining arches; one or more large square towers, and a semi-circular apse with radiating small chapels. Decoration usually included very ornate sculpted capitals on columns and an elaborate semi-circular sculpted tympanum, usually illustrating the Last Judgement, over the main portal. Interior decoration often included murals covering the walls, colored tiles, and early stained glass windows. Late in the 12th century, the rib vault began to appear, particularly in churches in Normandy and Paris, introducing the transition to the Gothic style.

== Characteristics ==
=== Plan ===
At the beginning of the eleventh century, inspired by the appearance of the style in northern Italy, Romanesque architecture spread west across southern France as far as Catalonia and Spain, and then north up the valley of the Rhône river. In the early Romanesque period, churches followed the traditional form of a Roman basilica, particularly the plan of the Byzantine Basilica of San Vitale in Ravenna. They had a single long nave, usually without a transept, which ended in a hemispherical apse. They usually had at least one bell tower, sometimes separated from the nave.

In the later Romanesque period, in the last third of the 11th century, new building techniques were introduced which allowed taller and wider churches. Two new plans became common. The first was the Benedictine plan, used in Cluny Abbey and the other new Benedictine monasteries. It featured three naves, with a transept at the crossing, and ranks of small chapels on either side of the apse on the east end. A modified plan appeared in the new abbeys and churches designed to welcome pilgrims traveling to shrines in Spain. These new churches were designed to accommodate large numbers of visitors, and included an ambulatory, or walkway, leading to several small chapels radiating in a semicircle from the apse. The ambulatory allowed visitors to easily access any of the chapels, without disturbing the service in the nave. They often had multiple towers over the entrance and wings of the transept, and sometimes a dome over the crossing point of the transept and nave. Saint-Front de Périgueux, modeled after St Mark's Basilica in Venice, is an example.

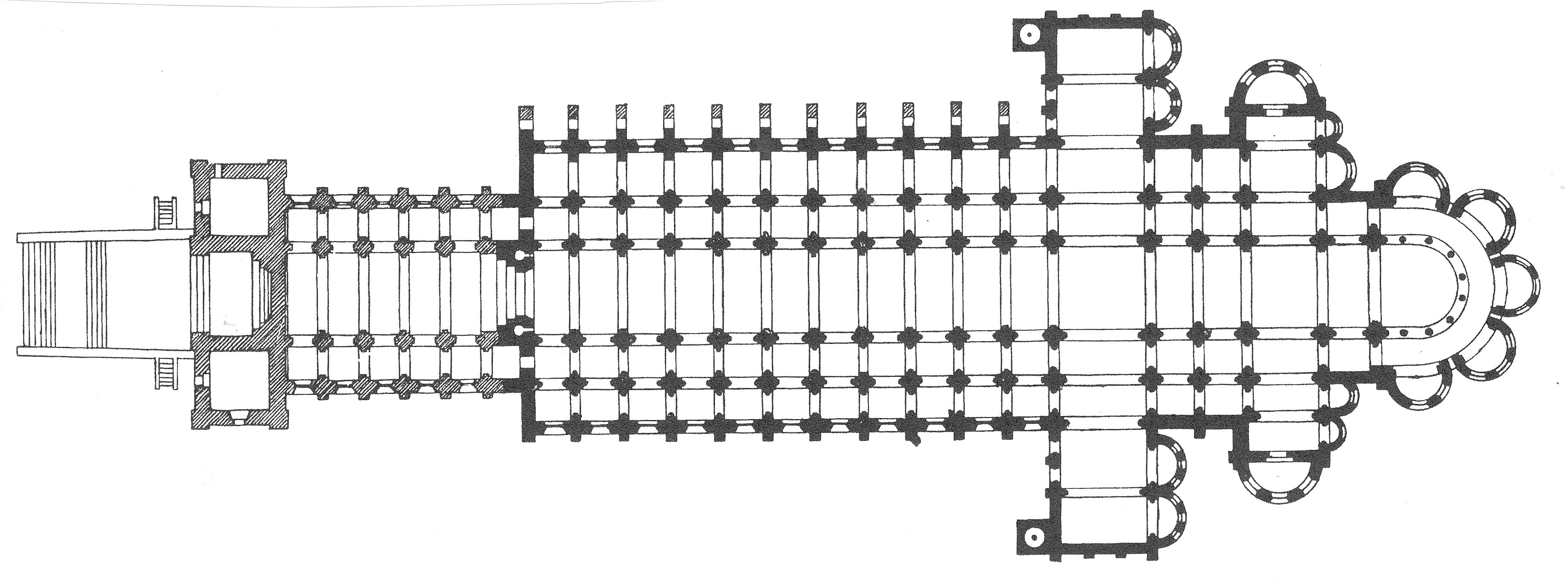
Plan of Cluny Abbey, with portal and pre-nave (avant-nave) and two towers, on the west, two transepts with towers, and an apse with radiating chapels on the east.

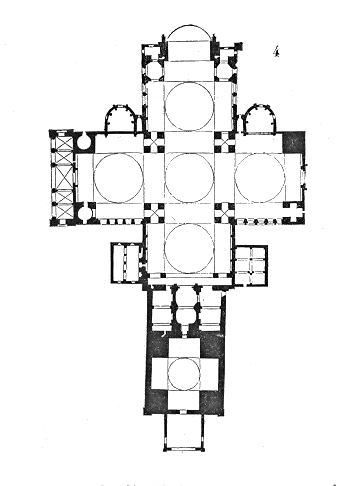
A pilgrimage church. Plan of Saint-Front de Périgueux, a cruciform with five cupolas, modeled after St Mark's Basilica in Venice

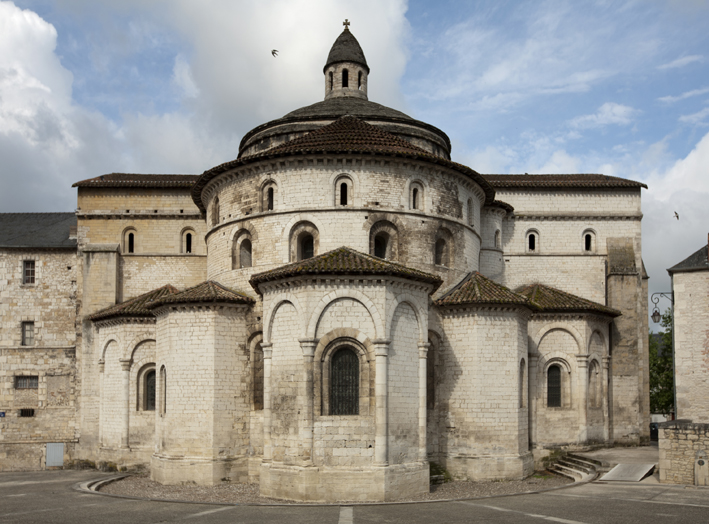
Apse of Abbaye Saint-Marie in Souillac, with radiating chapels

=== Arches and vaults ===
Rounded arches were the most common and most distinctive feature of the Romanesque style, though near the end of the period, pointed arches began to appear, particularly in Normandy. Builders began to experiment with vaulted ceilings, first in the crypt below the church, and then in the nave. The earliest types were the simple barrel vault, which rested upon rows of massive columns. Later churches used the voute d'arête or groin vault, two barrel vaults combined at right angles, which were stronger but required great skill to construct. Later in the period, the voute en berceau briséé or rib vault was introduced, which carried the thrust of the weight of the roof outwards and downwards, through thin ribs, to supporting columns and buttresses.

As the naves became higher and higher, with the weight pressing down and outward on the walls, the walls had to be supported by massive masonry buttresses on the outside. Because of the need for thick, solid walls, the windows were few and small in size. The ground floor had rows of massive columns, which supported the vaults of the roof. The walls were divided by thin colonettes, which also provided support to the roof.

The domes were either supported by an octagonal base (Sur trompes) or a circular base (Sur pendentifs), composed of barrel arches meeting at right angles.

The six-part rib vault, a key innovation in the transition to Gothic architecture, had been introduced in England in about 1100, and made its first appearance in France in the reconstruction of the naves of the church of the Abbey of Saint-Étienne, Caen, The Abbey of Sainte-Trinité, Caen, in about 1120. It also appeared in Burgundy and in an experimental version at the Abbey of Vézelay at about the same time. These vaults allowed ceilings that were lighter and stronger, and carried the weight outwards to columns and buttresses, so the supporting walls could be higher and thinner, with larger windows.

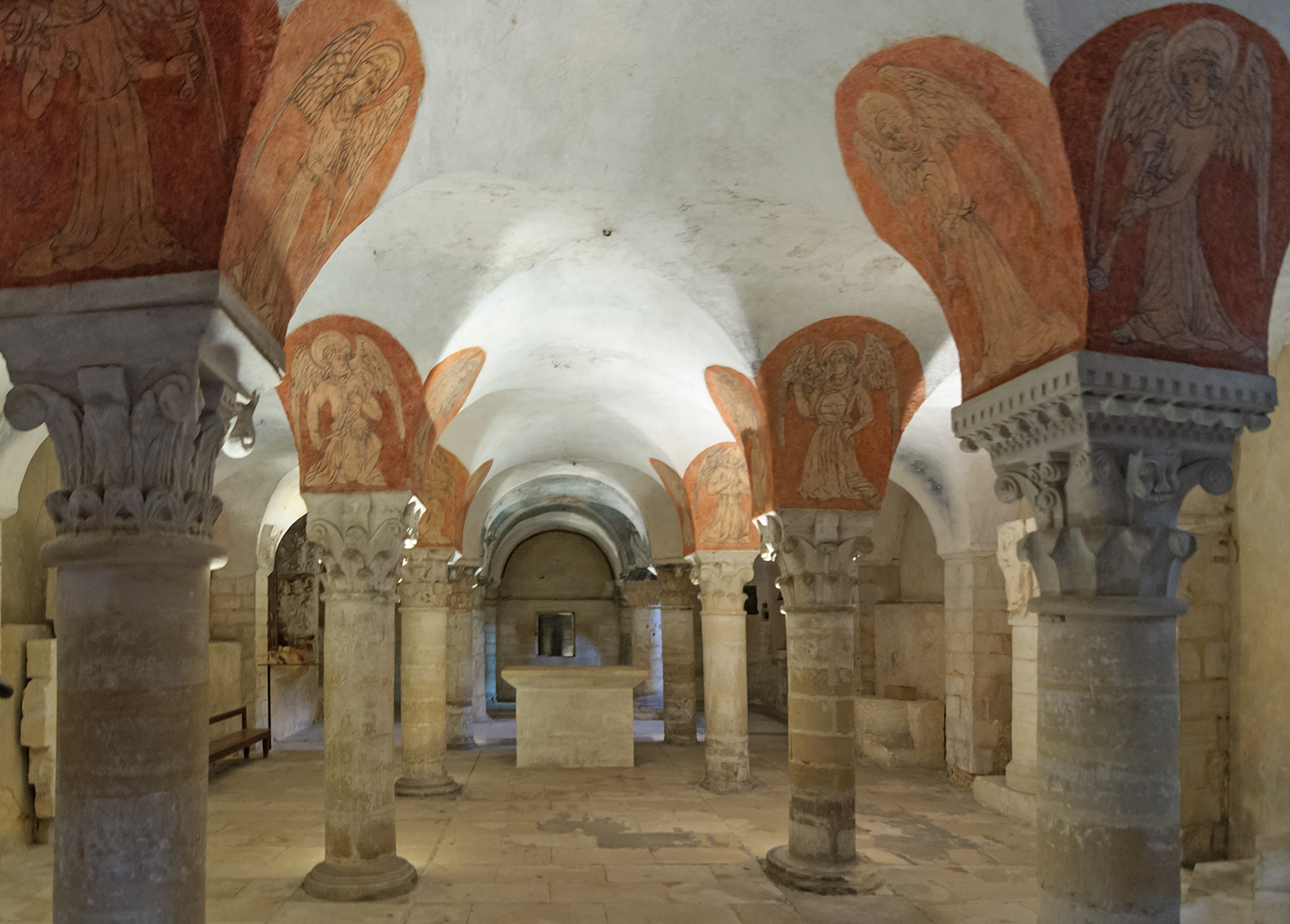
Groin vaults in the crypt of Bayeux Cathedral (1077)

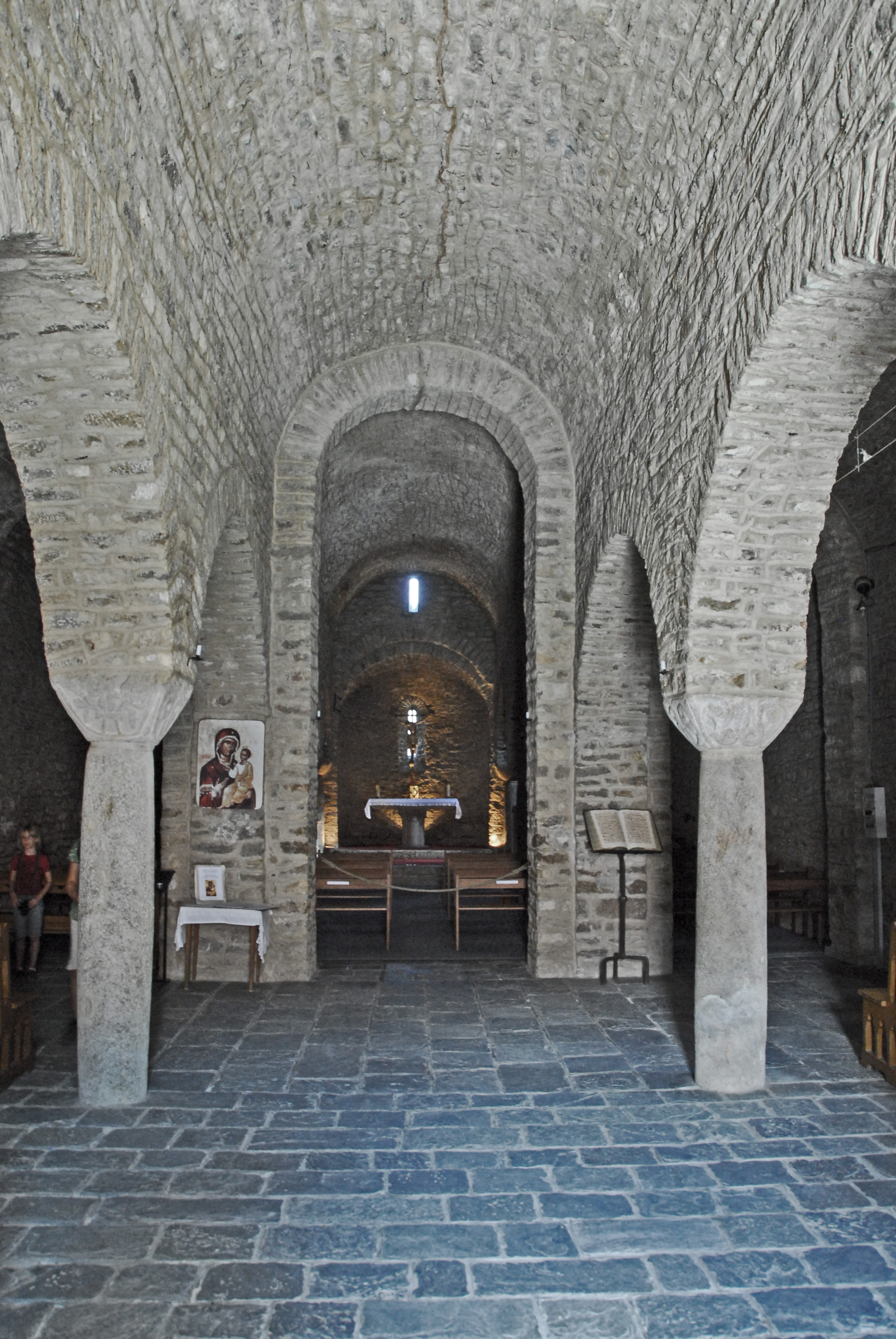
Early vaults of Saint-Martin-du-Canigou (11th century)

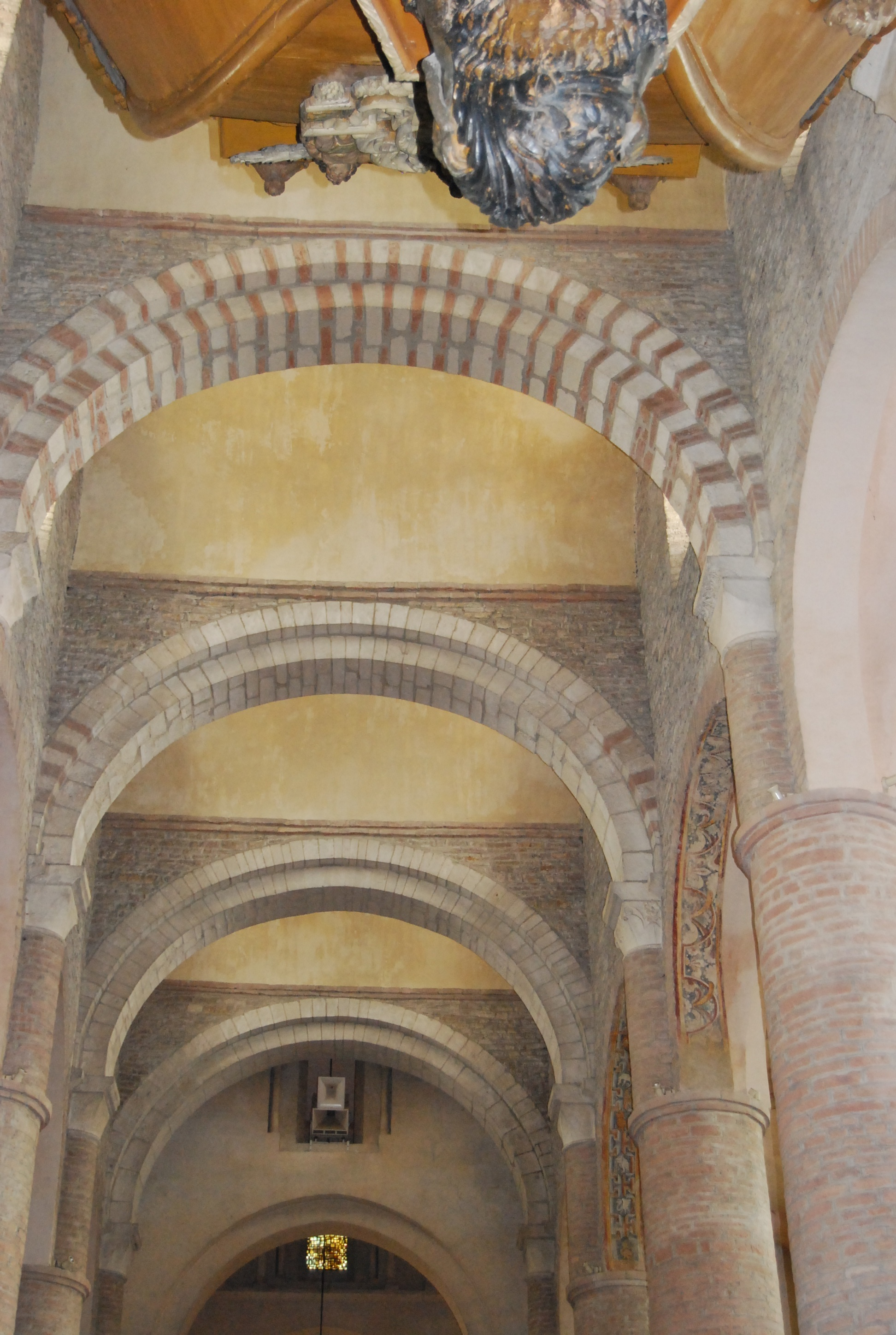
Vaulted ceiling of Saint-Philibert de Tournus (11th century)

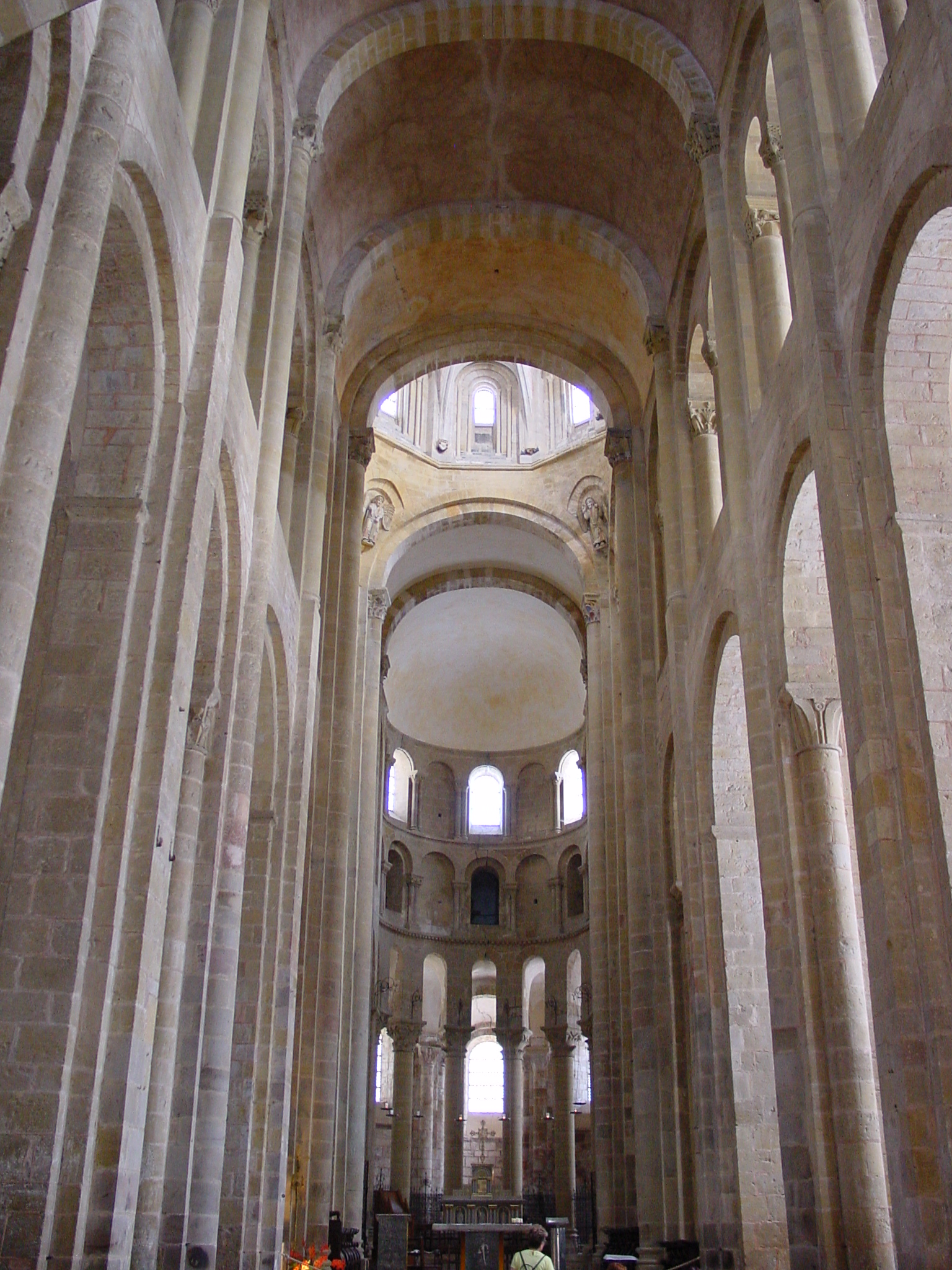
Vaulted ceiling of Abbey Church of Sainte-Foy (end of 11th century)

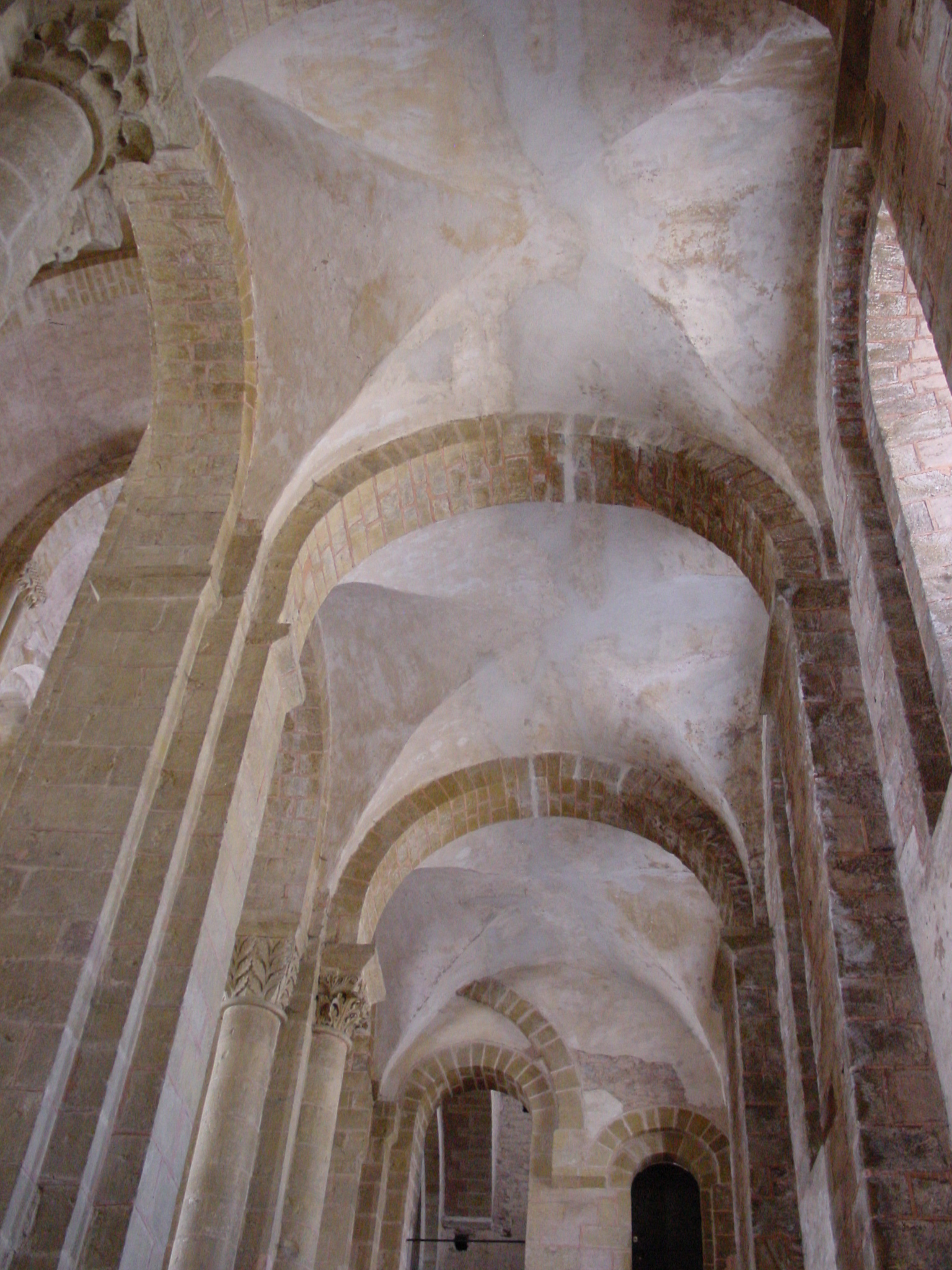
Groin vaults at Abbey Church of Sainte-Foy (end of 11th century)

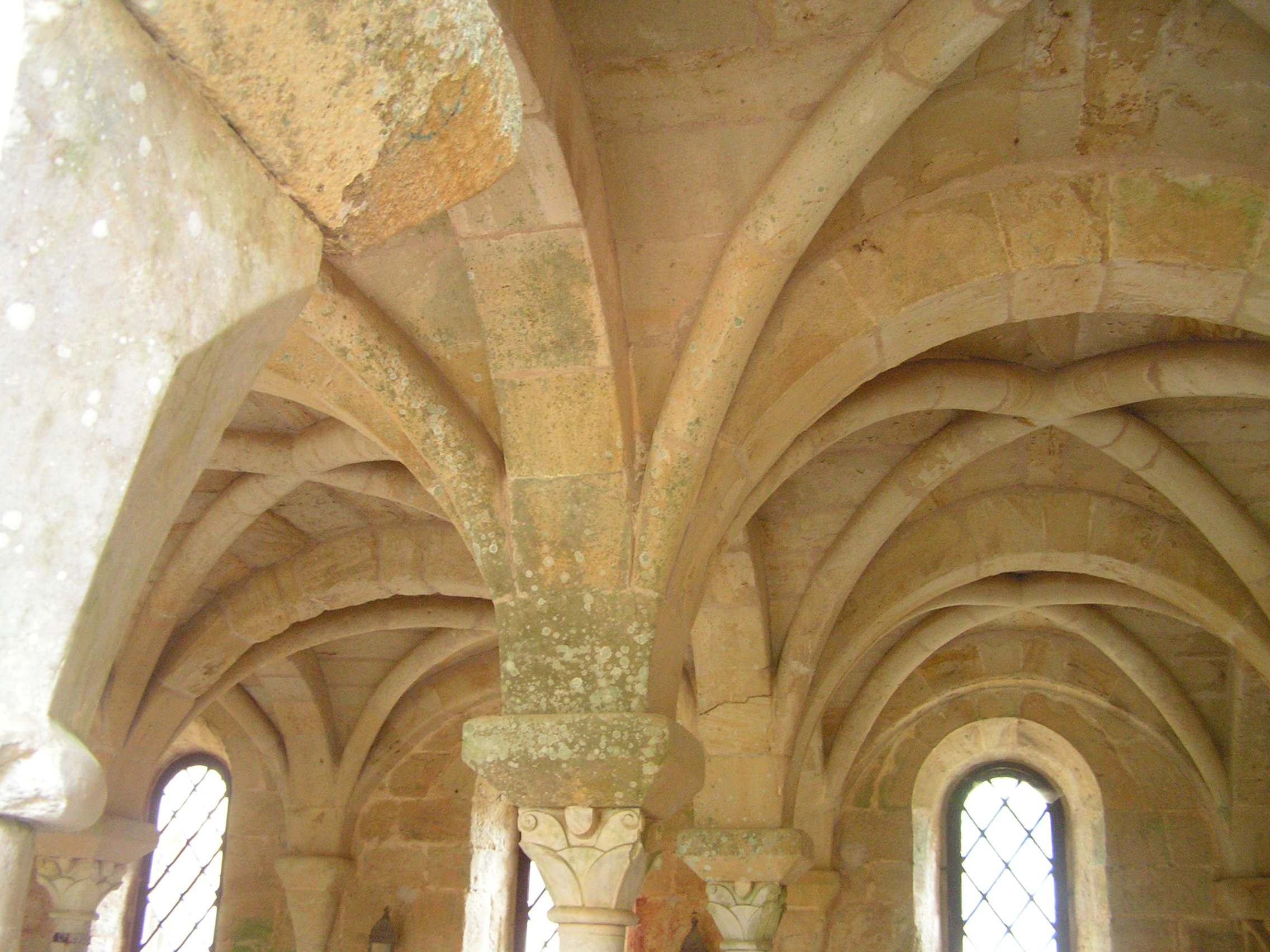
Vaults of Chapter House of Fontfroide Abbey

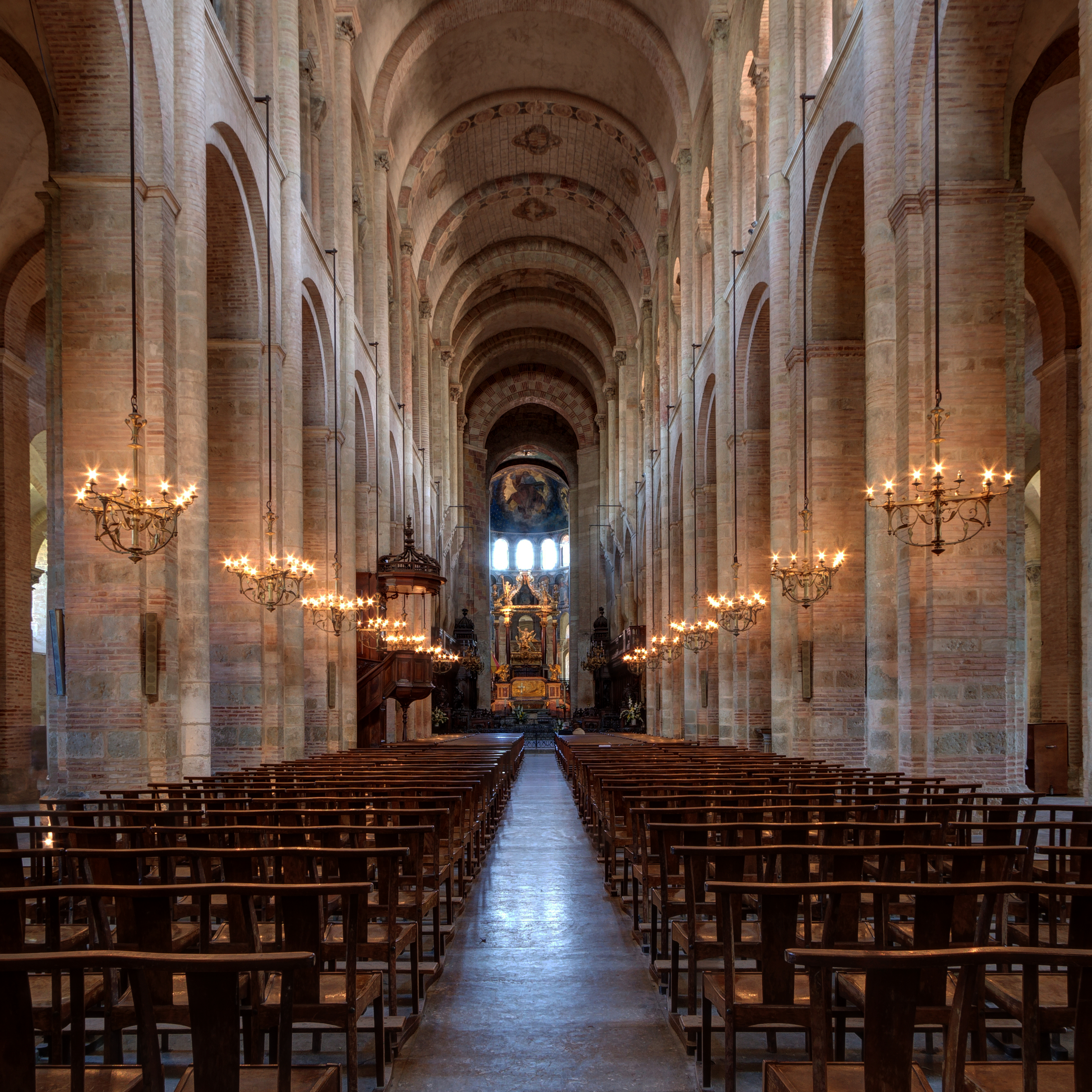
Nave of Saint-Sernin Basilica in Toulouse

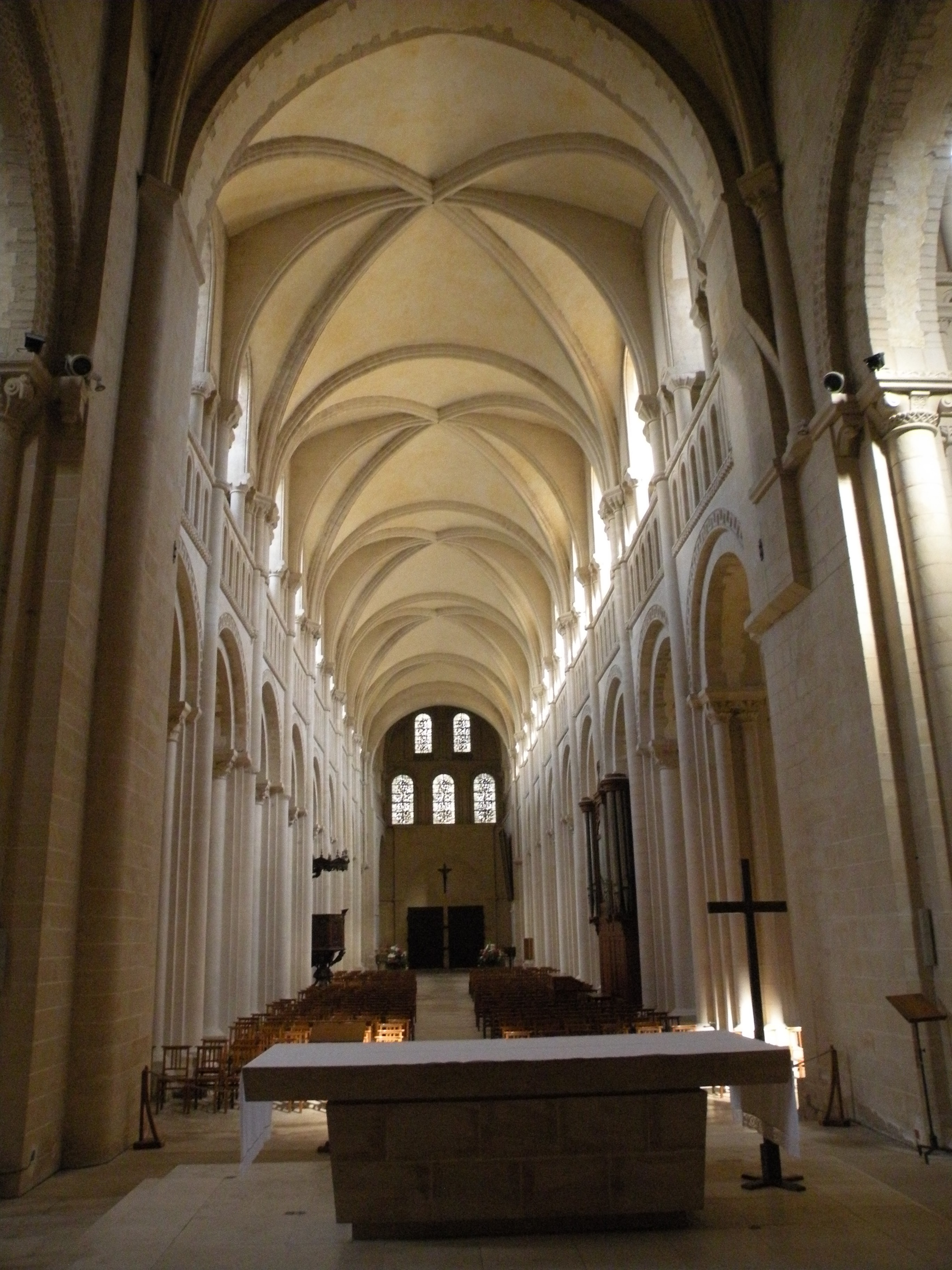
Six-part rib vault in the Abbey of Sainte-Trinité, Caen (about 1120), the transition to the Gothic style

=== Elevations ===
The walls were divided into vertical sections, separated by thin columns of colonettes which supported the vaults of the roof. The ground level of the nave was usually flanked by columned arcades. These were usually surmounted by tribunes, or a galleries, where the faithful could gather to watch the ceremony in the nave below. The level above the tribune usually had a row of windows bringing light into the interior.

The tribunes provided greater width and support to the wall, which meant that churches could be higher. In some churches in the Auvergne region, the tribune rose up two levels, which meant that little light came into the nave. In Normandy, the tribune was often replaced by a triforium, a narrow walkway. In Aquitaine, the churches had a single wide nave, which allowed more light to enter. Taller churches required heavy stone buttresses placed against the exterior walls to support the weight of the roof. This problem was not resolved until the Gothic period, when the introduction of the rib vault transferred the weight of the roof to the flying buttresses outside the walls.

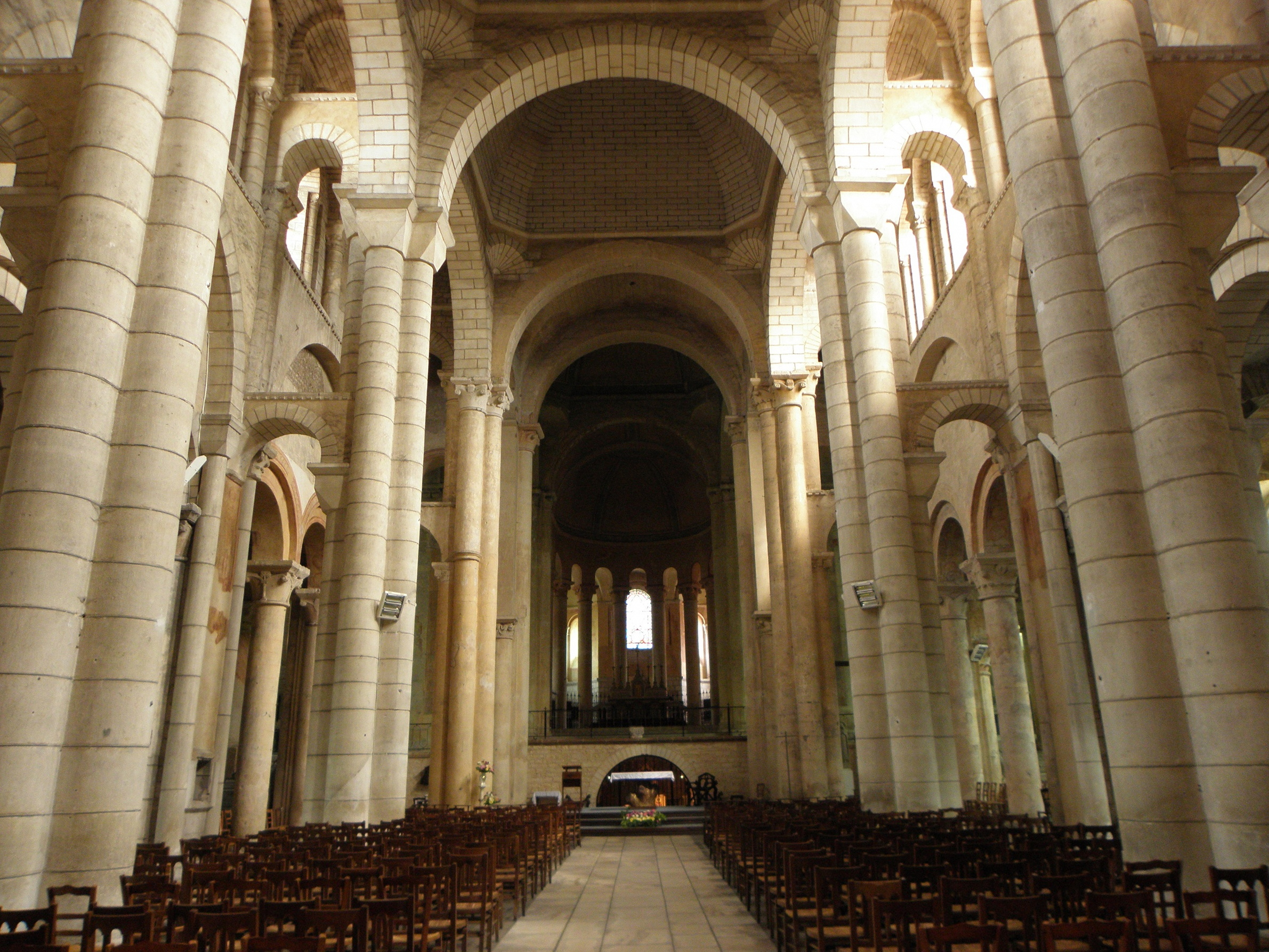
Église Saint-Hilaire-le-Grand in Poitiers (about 1130)

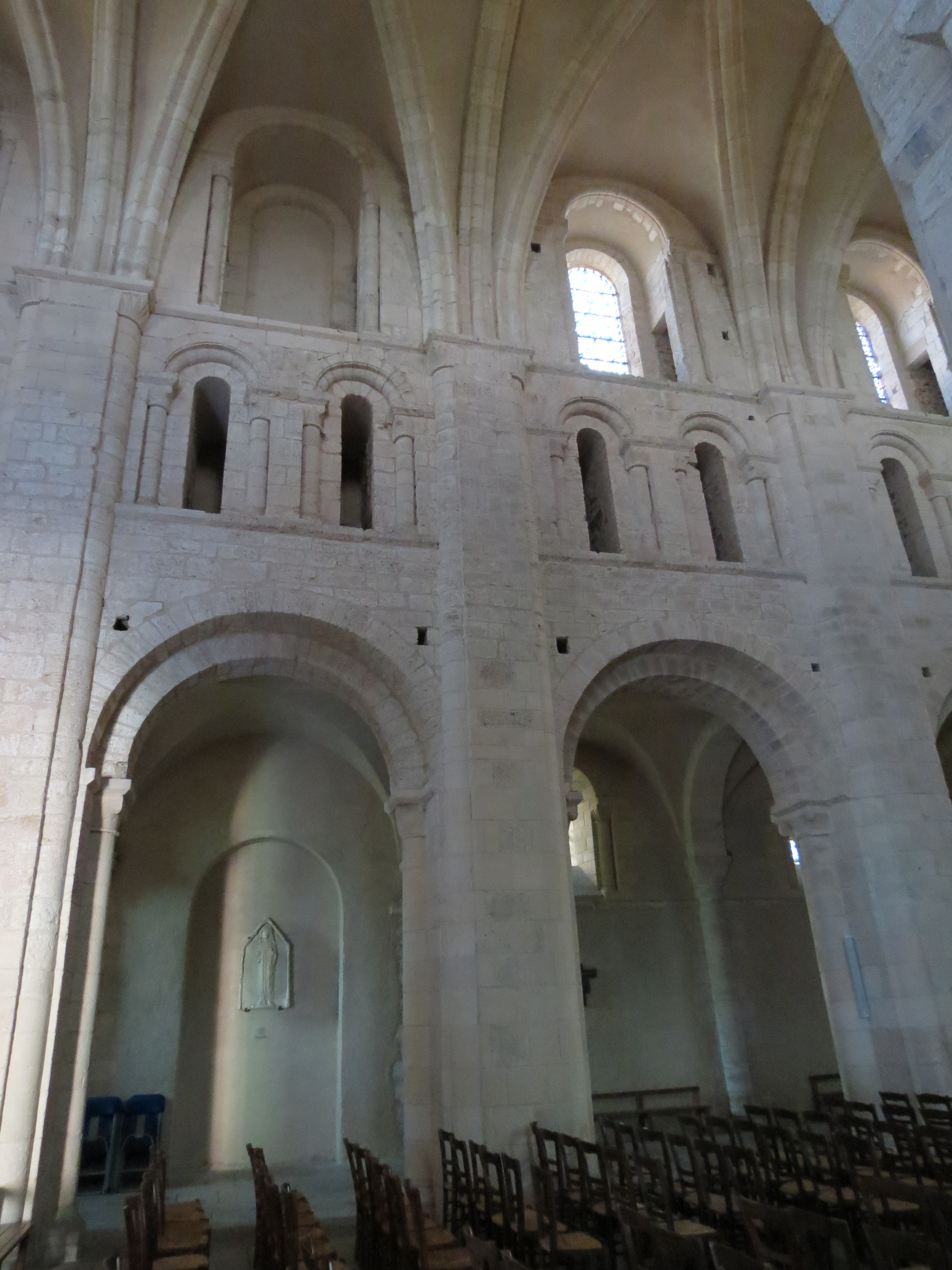
Lessay Abbey in Normandy (begun 1080), with a triforium instead of a tribune as the middle level

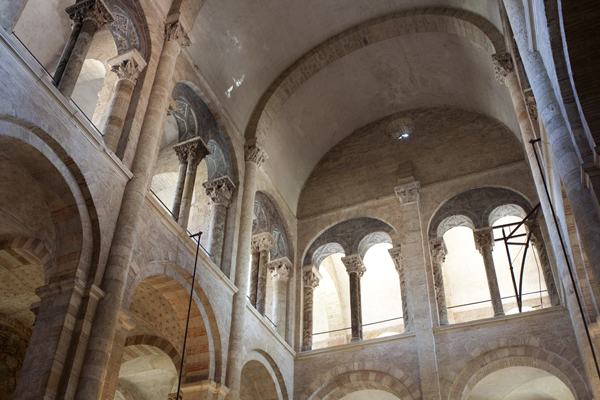
Elevation of the Basilica of Saint-Sernin, Toulouse (about 1118)

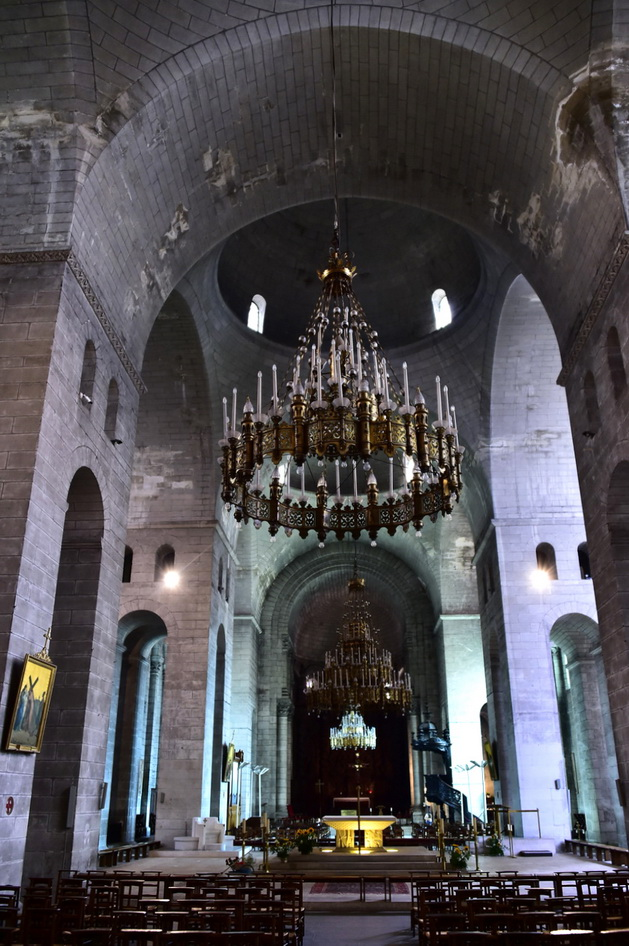
Interior of Saint-Front Cathedral in Périgueux

=== Facades ===
The exterior decoration of the early Romanesque churches was simple, usually composed of vertical stripes of carved stone joined at the top by a band of simple arcs (bandes lombardes); or a frieze of arcs, and, at the chevet, a series of toothlike niches. The columns often had cubic carved capitals. Exterior decoration was usually either vegetal, such as carved acanthus leaves or palm fronds, or geometric forms. Occasionally sculpture with simplified human forms with biblical texts appeared on the lintels.

However, with the construction of new abbeys and pilgrimage churches, the facades became much more theatrical. The facade of the Église Notre-Dame la Grande, Poitiers, is one of the best surviving examples of a Romanesque pilgrimage church facade. It does not have a sculpted tympanum over its portal; instead, the whole facade serves as a theater of biblical scenes; a frieze of sculptures over the portals represents the stories of the original sin and redemption; a multitude of small sculptures around the doors depicts fabulous animals and other biblical themes.

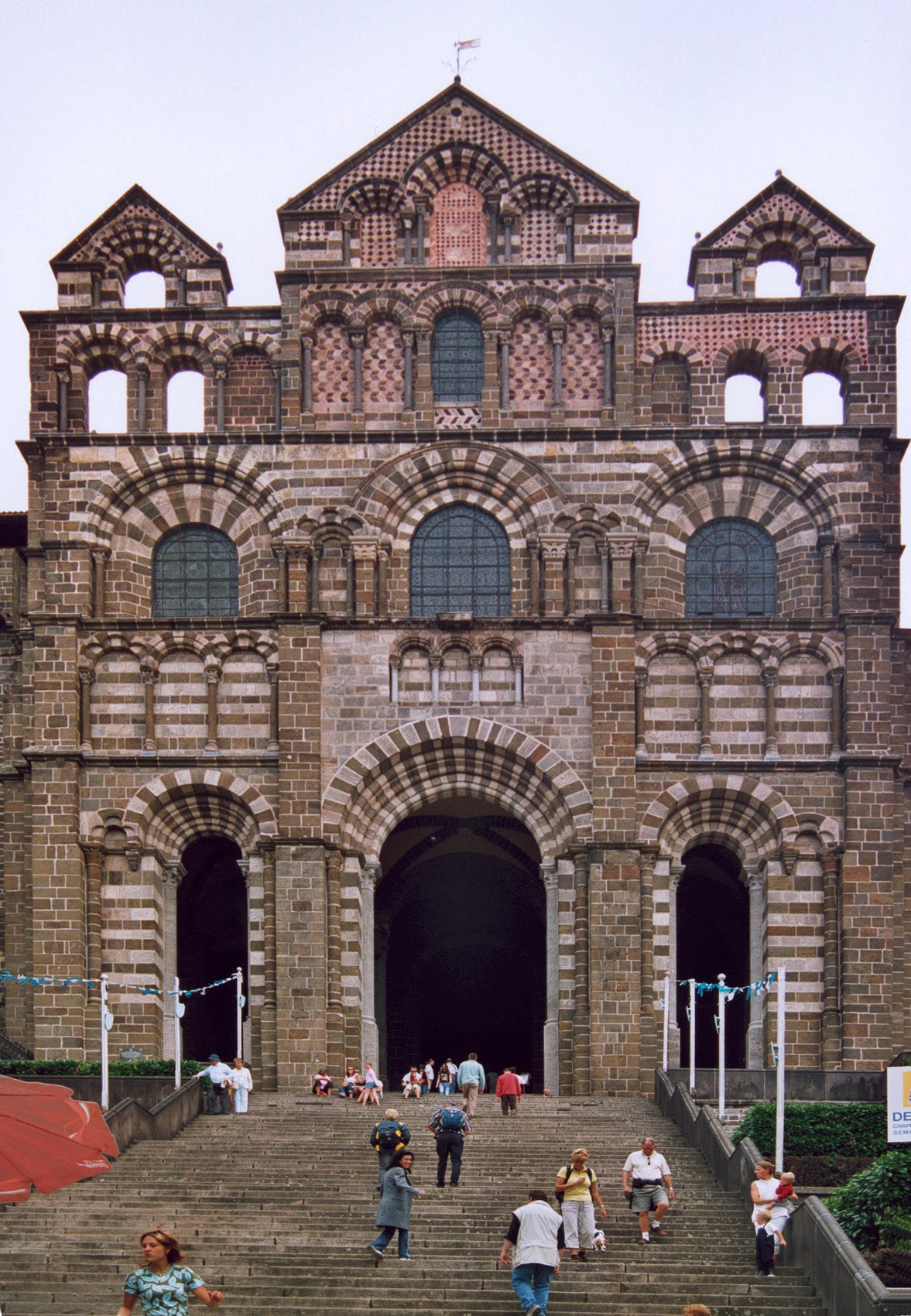
The facade of Notre Dame du Puy, in the southwestern Auvergne region, is built of brick, local white sandstone and black volcanic stone (11th century)

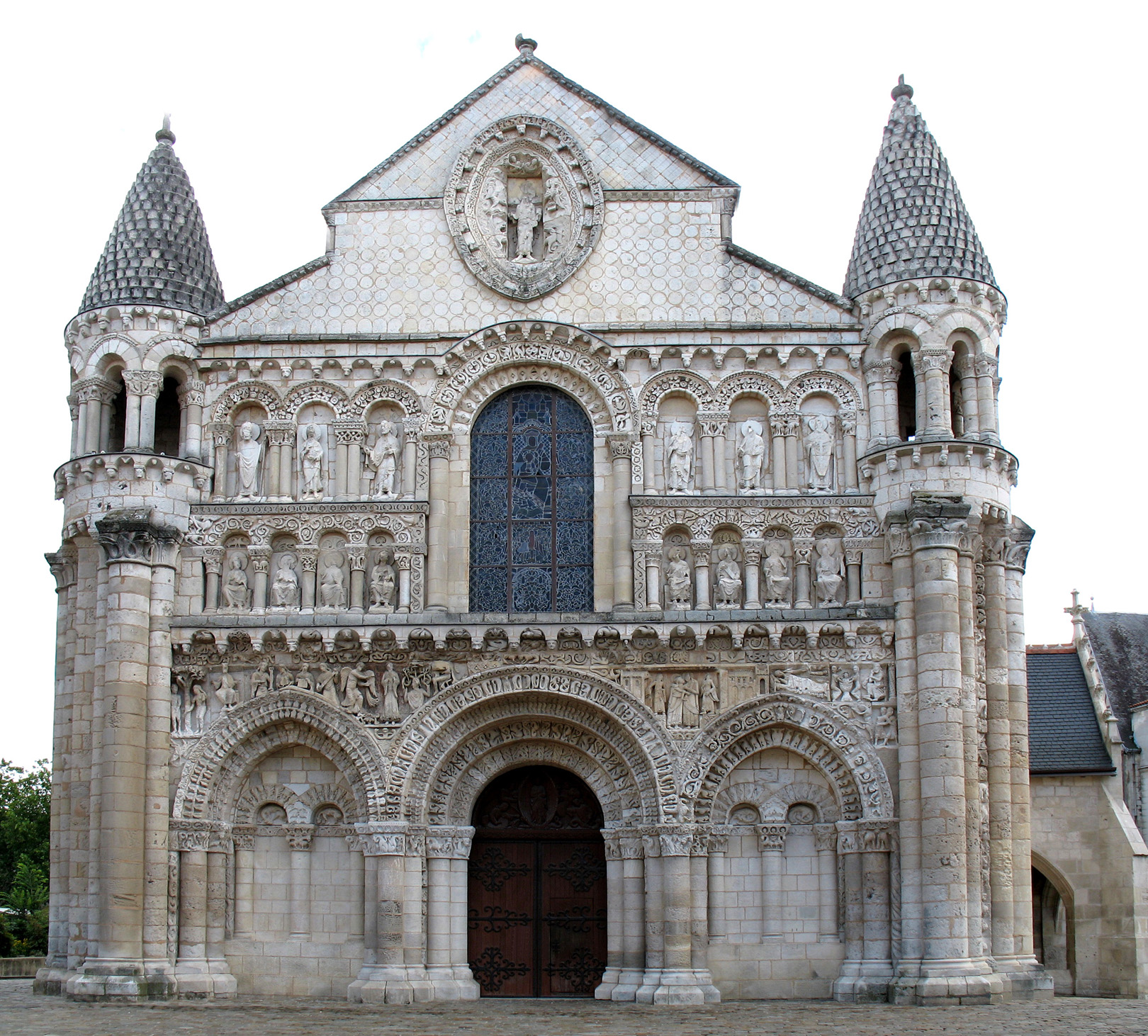
Facade of the Église Notre-Dame la Grande, Poitiers (second quarter of 12th century)

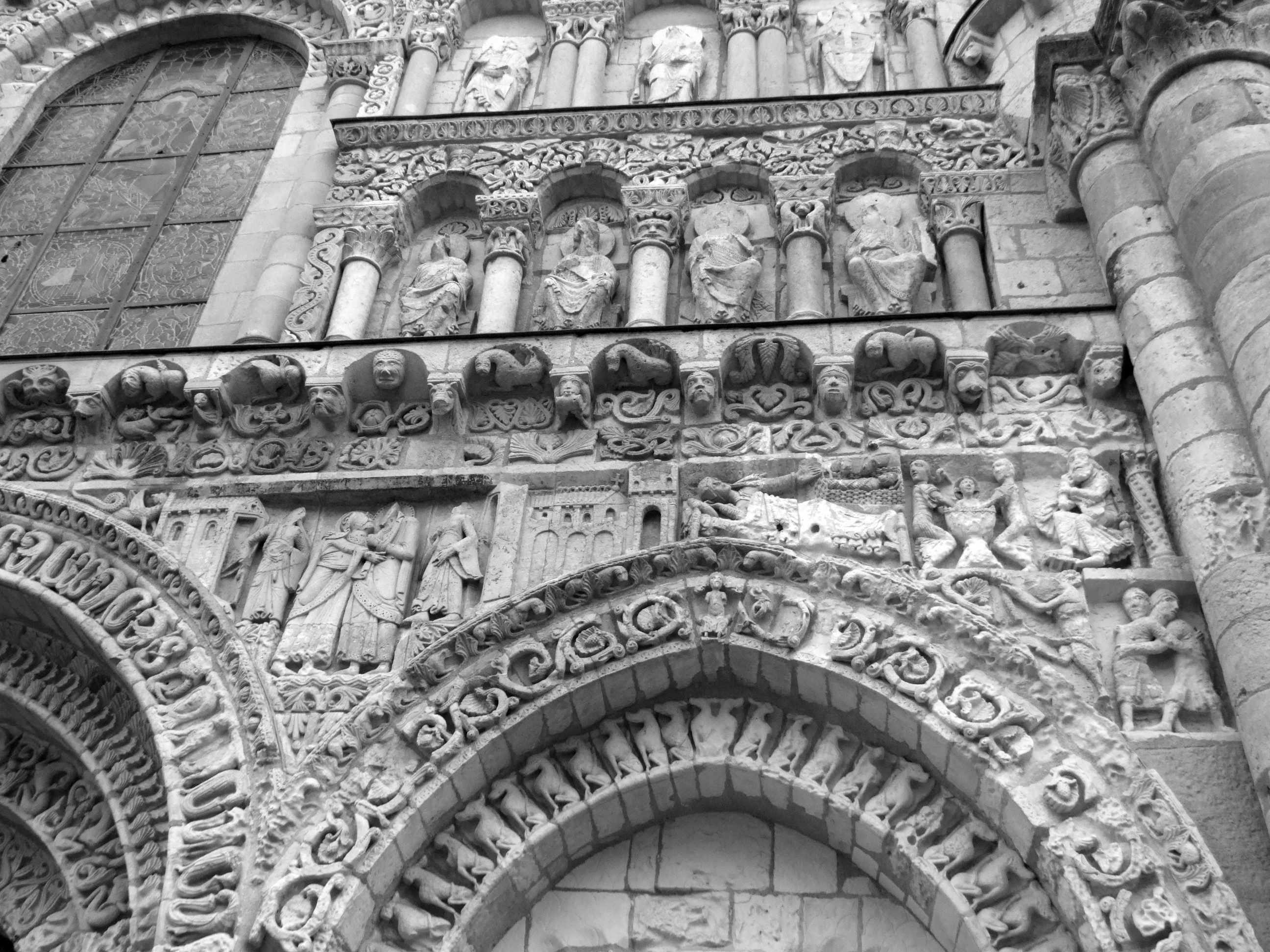
Detail of the frieze of the Église Notre-Dame la Grande, Poitiers

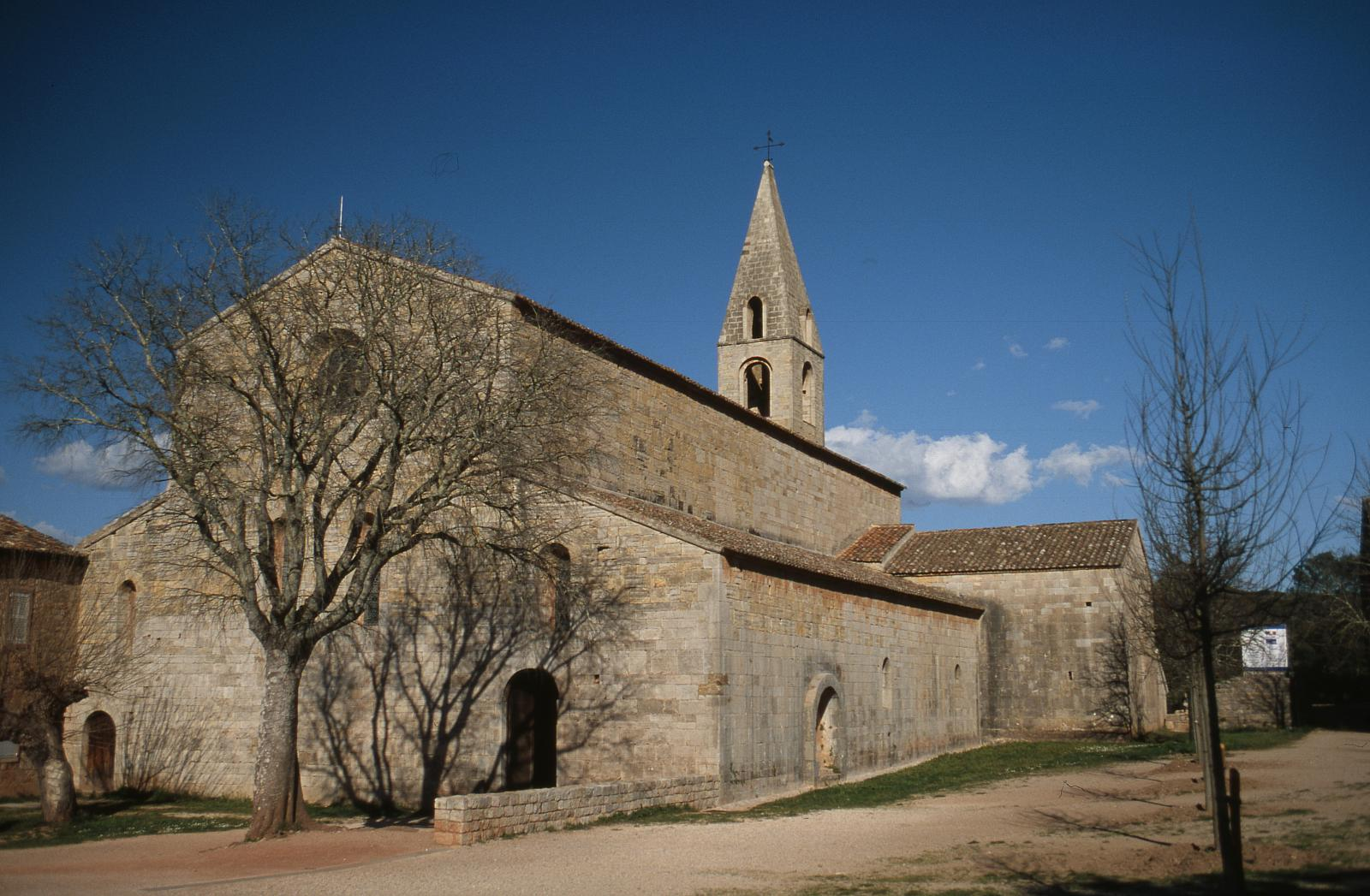
Facade of the church of the Cistercian Thoronet Abbey, entirely bare of ornament (1176–1200)

=== Portals ===
The portal, or entrance, of the Romanesque church received the most elaborate and dramatic sculptural decoration. It was designed as the Porta Coeli or "Doorway to heaven", a depiction of biblical stories and images in stone, which in earlier churches had been shown on the sculpture of the altar. The usual themes of the portal were the Biblical Day of Judgement, promising Redemption for good Christians, and the Apocalypse for the others. Each church was different; at Moissac. the figure of Christ was surrounded by the four Evangelists, and the group was encircled by the twenty-four figures of the Apocalypse. The portal of Toulouse cathedral featured the Ascension of Christ, while the Abbey Church of Sainte-Foy illustrated the contrasts between hell and the virtuous life of Sainte-Foy.

While the portals of cathedrals traditionally faced west, on Romanesque churches they often were oriented toward the main street or square of the town. In the Cathedral of Cahors it faced north, onto the ancient main street; in Toulouse and Moissiac it faced south, onto the street that led to the center of the town.

One of the most famous sculptural works of the French Romanesque period is Moissac Abbey, a modest-sized abbey which had been a dependency of Cluny since 1047. It was commissioned by the Abbot Roger between 1115 and 1131. It is 5.63 meters in diameter, and is composed of twenty-eight blocks of stone, which were sculpted and then assembled. It depicts the Apocalypse as described in the Bible by Saint John. Christ is seated on a throne in the center, surrounded by a lion, a bull, an eagle in flight, and a human face, which in turn surrounded by twenty-eight seated wise men, who will make the Last Judgement.

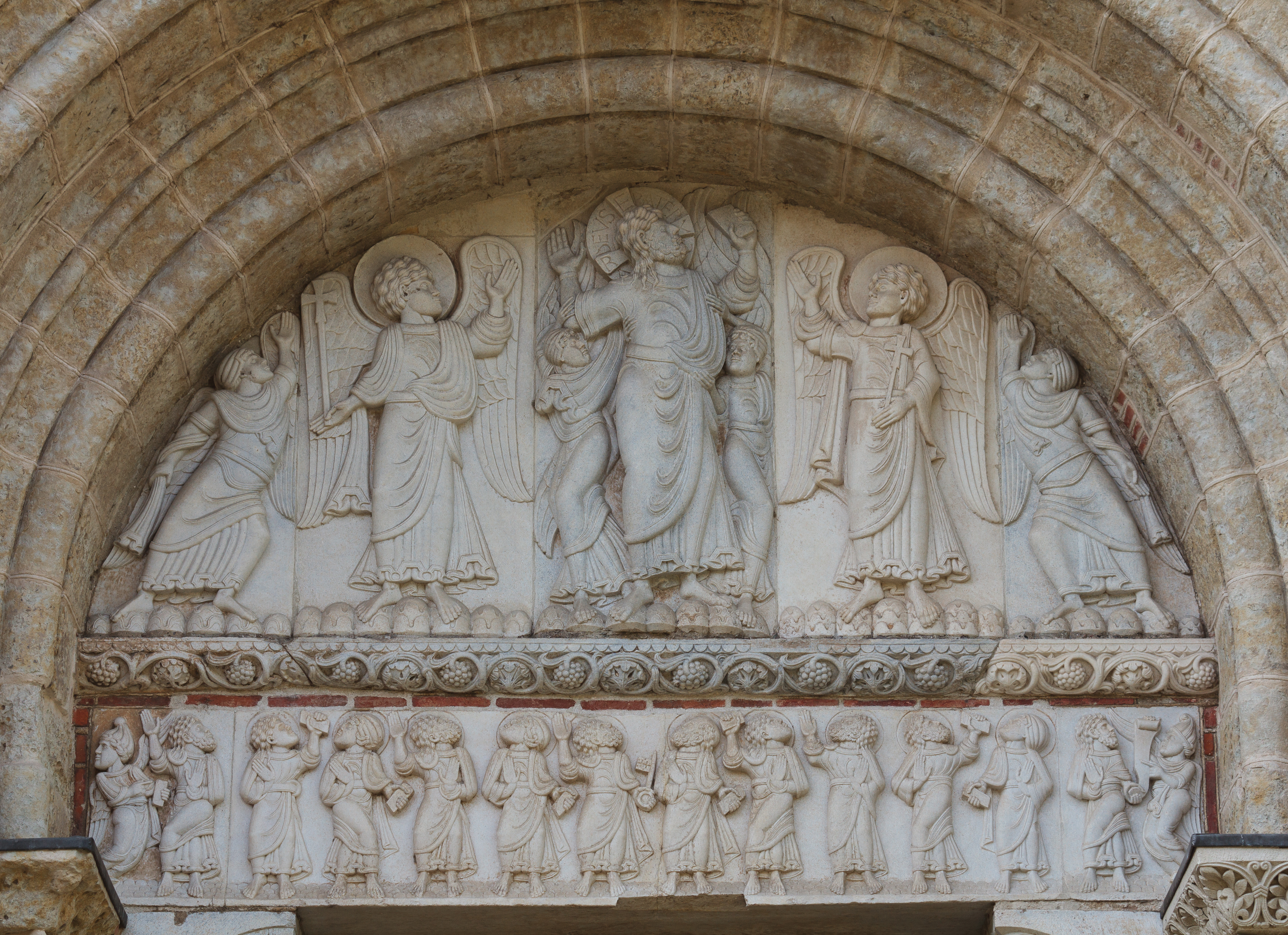
At the lateral entrance of Saint-Sernin of Toulouse, the ascending Christ, surrounded by superb angels, is the central figure on one of the oldest tympanums in Romanesque architecture (circa 1115).

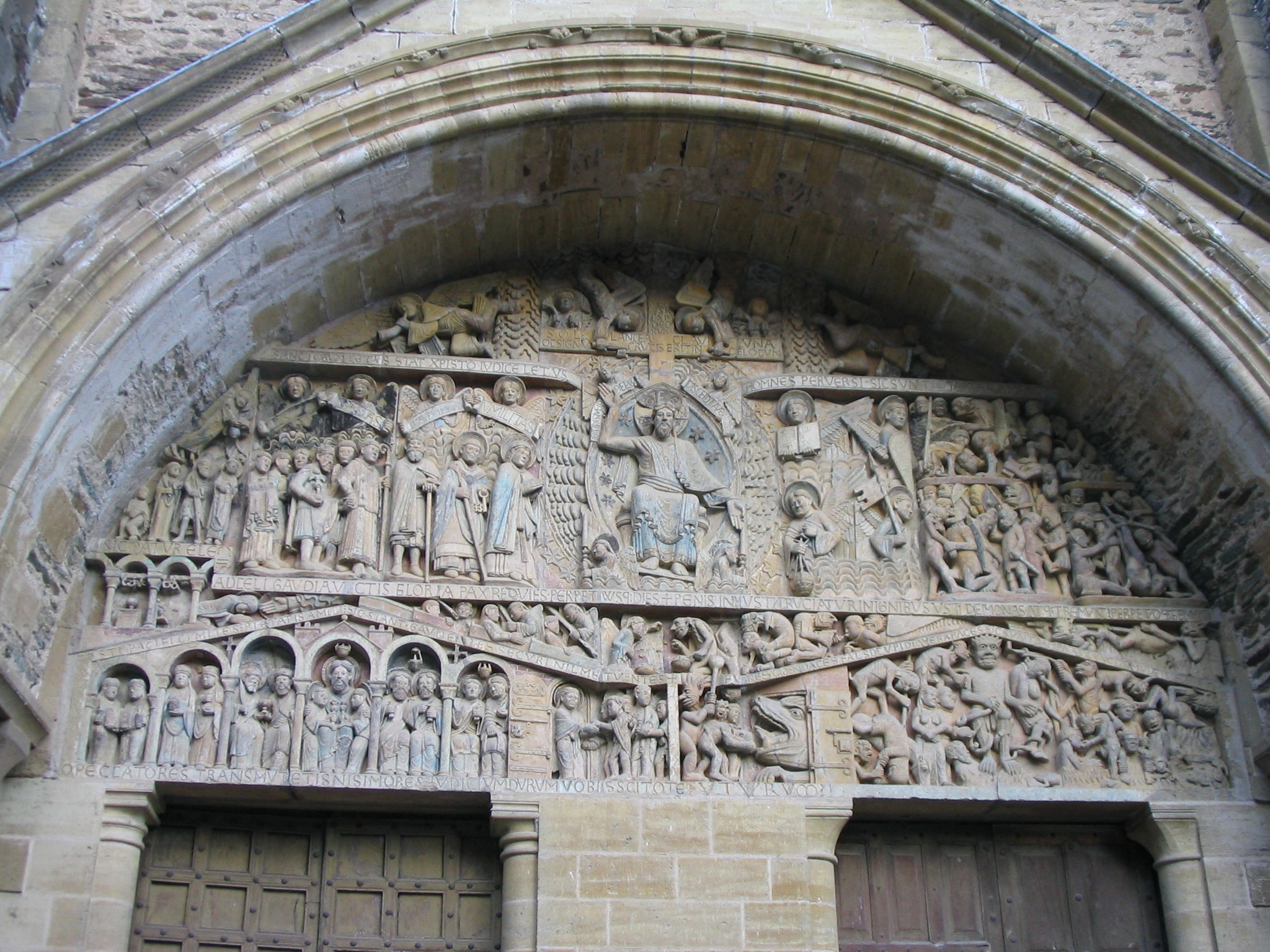
Portal of the Abbey Church of Sainte-Foy in Conques, showing the fate of the virtuous to the left and of sinners to the right

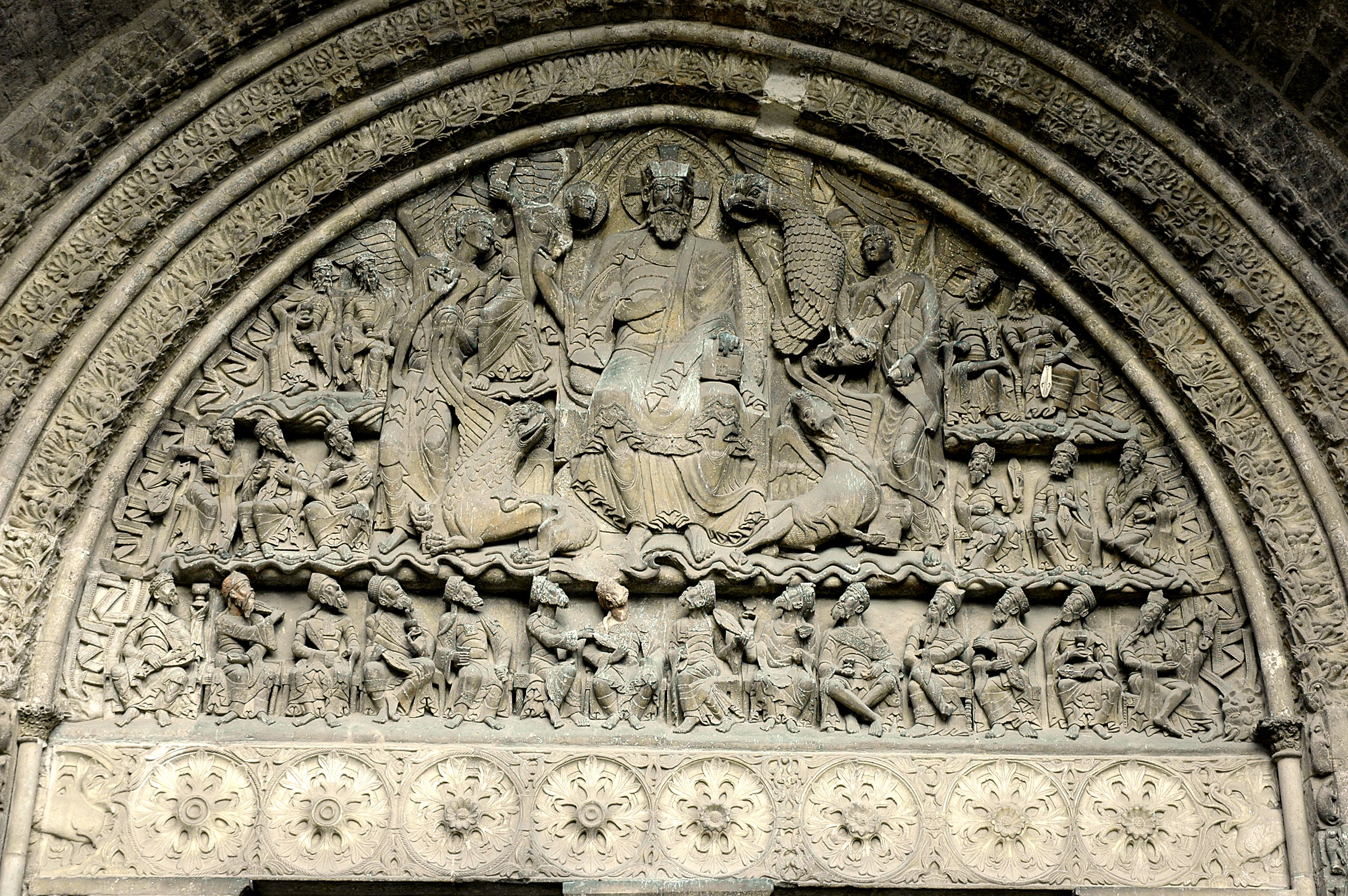
Southwest portal of Moissac Abbey (1115–1131) in the Tarn-et-Garonne in the Occitanie Region of Southern France

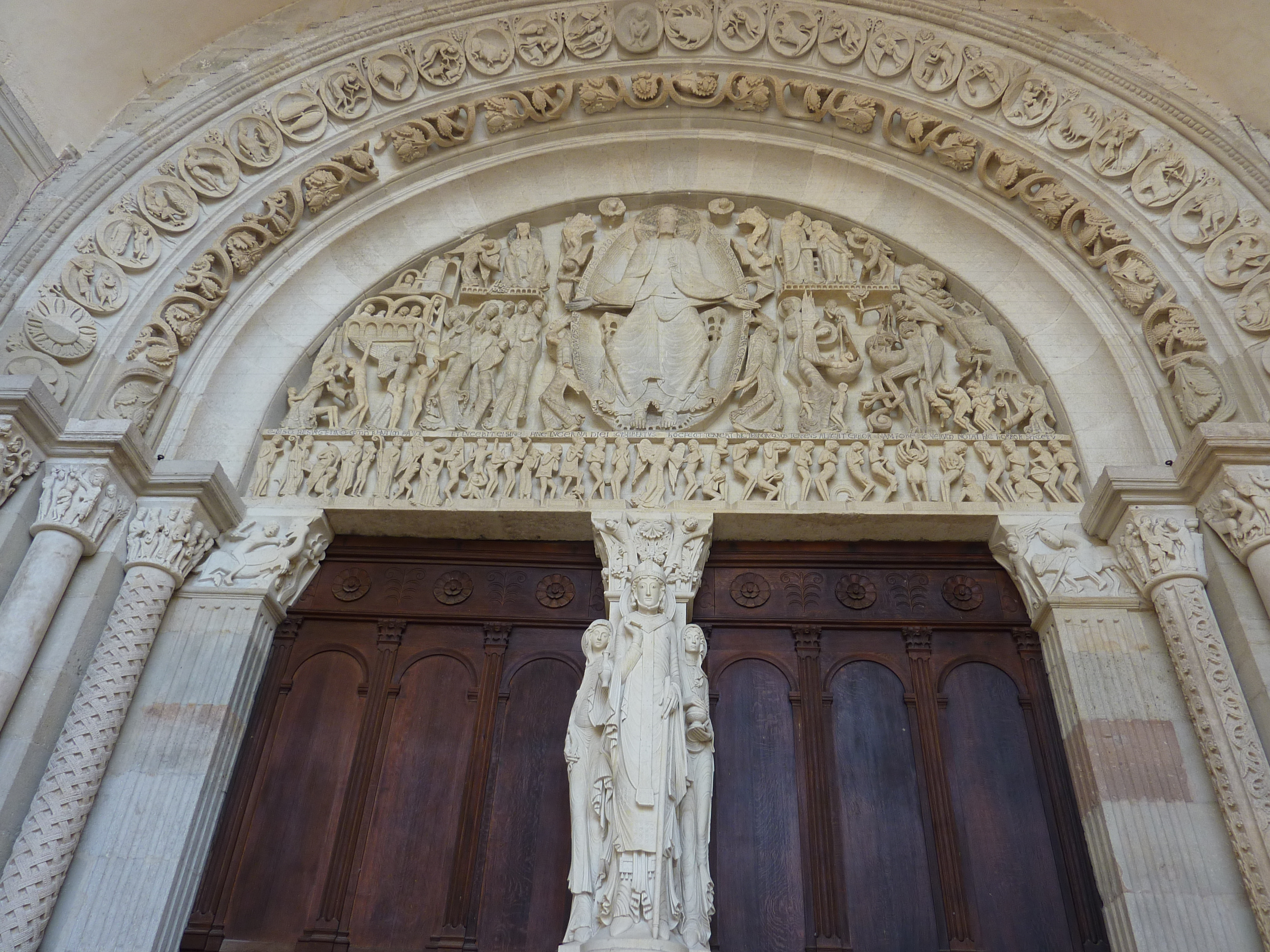
Tympanum of Autun Cathedral by Gislebertus, in the Burgundian style (about 1130)

=== Towers and domes ===
Bell towers and domes were another distinctive feature of the Romanesque. In the early monastery churches the bell tower Was often separate from the church. In the later period, large abbey churches, like Cluny, had two towers at the portal end, a tower where the transept crossed the nave, and towers on the ends of transept.

The main domes or cupolas were usually placed at crossing of the nave and the transept, and symbolized the heavens. They were often supported by four arches forming a square and supported by four massive pillars' which symbolically represented the four Evangelists, Matthew, Mark, Luke and John. The pillars held up a Voûte d'arêtes, or cross vault, where the barrels vaults of the nave and transept met at right angles. The curving triangular surfaces of these vaults, which joined the six or eight sides of the cupola to the four pillars, were called squinches', or pendentives, and were often decorated with the faces of the Four Evangelists, who were considered the symbolic link between the heavens and earth, or with angels or other Biblical figures.

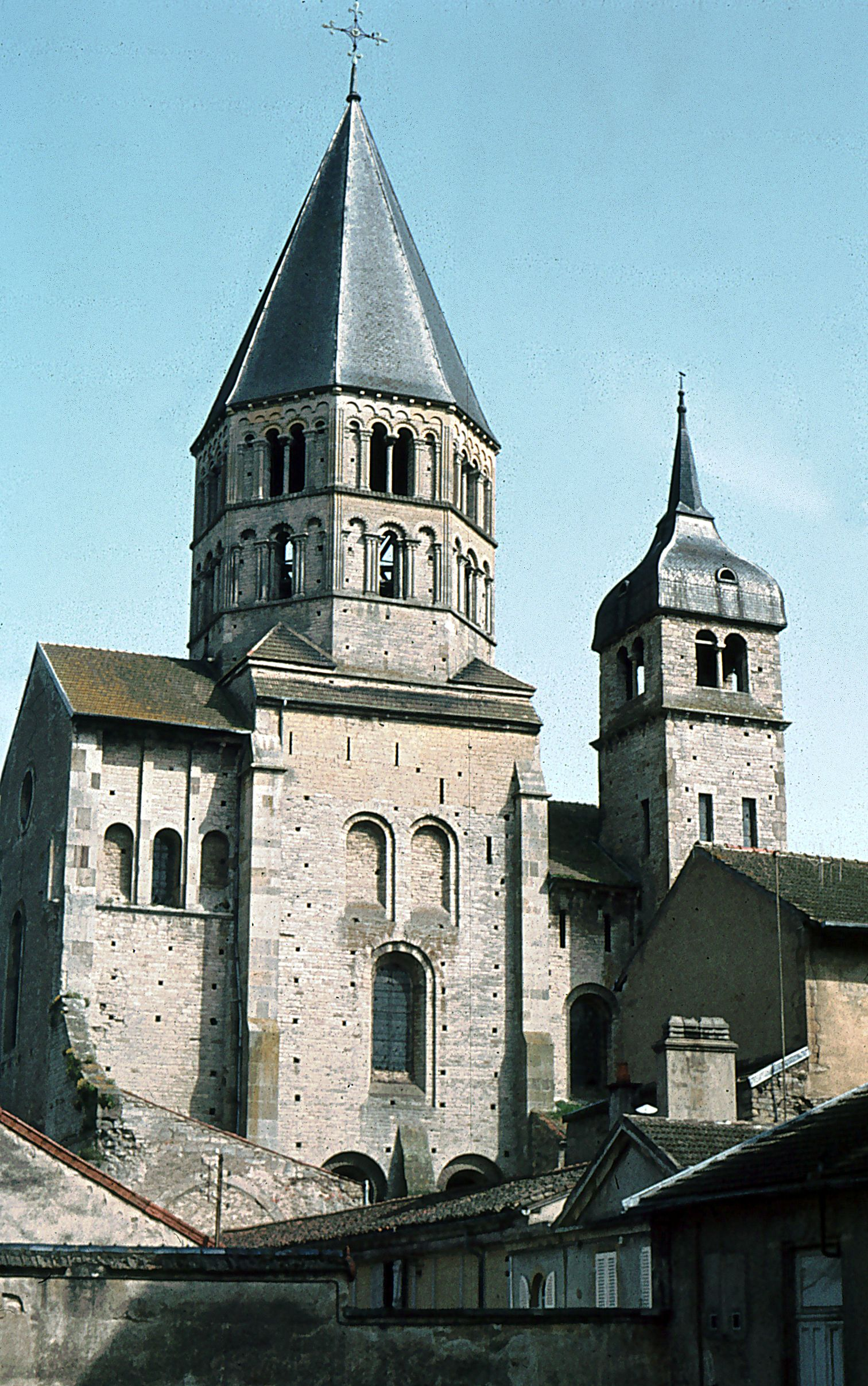
The surviving tower of Cluny Abbey

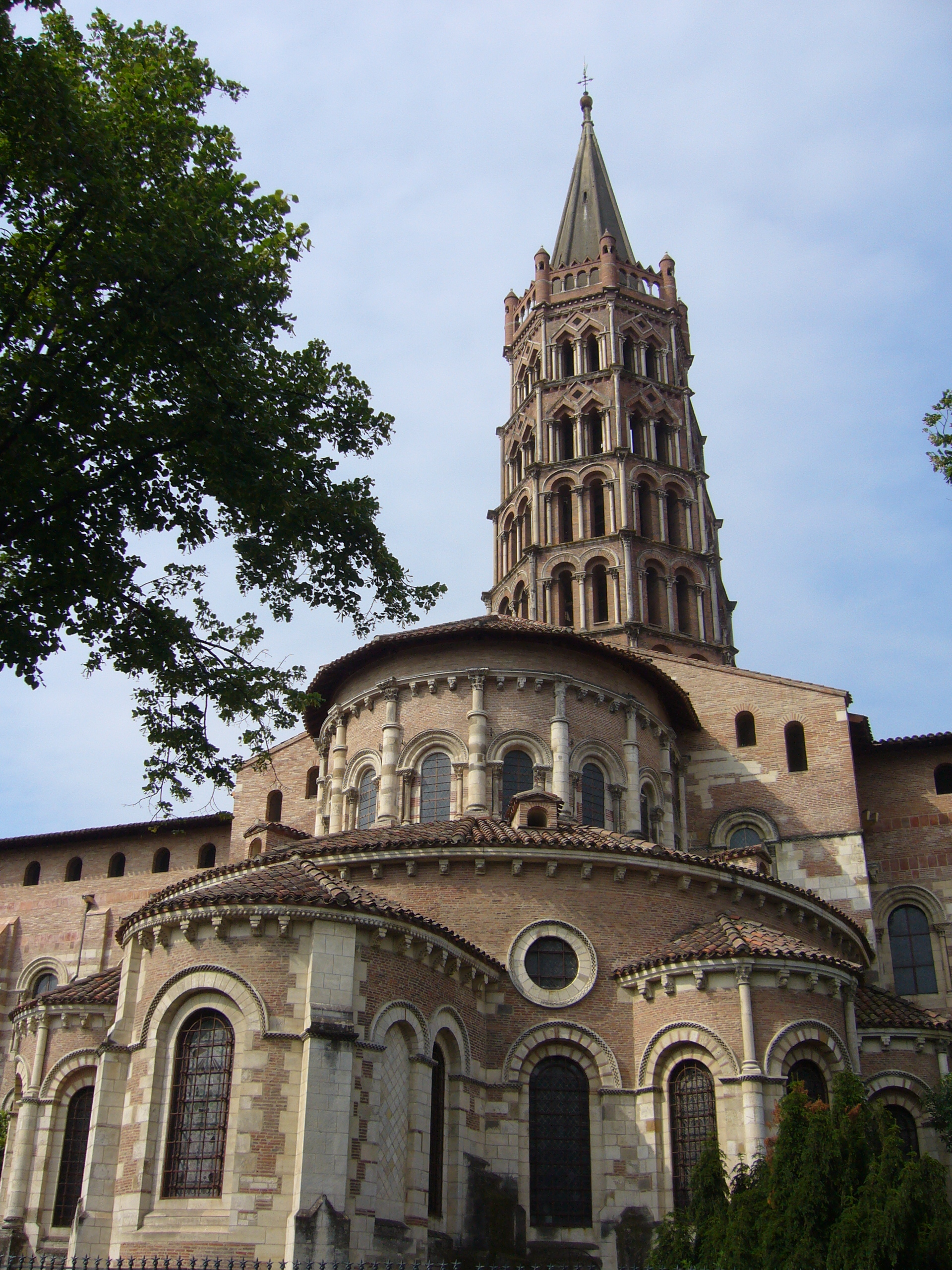
Tower of Basilica of Saint-Sernin, Toulouse

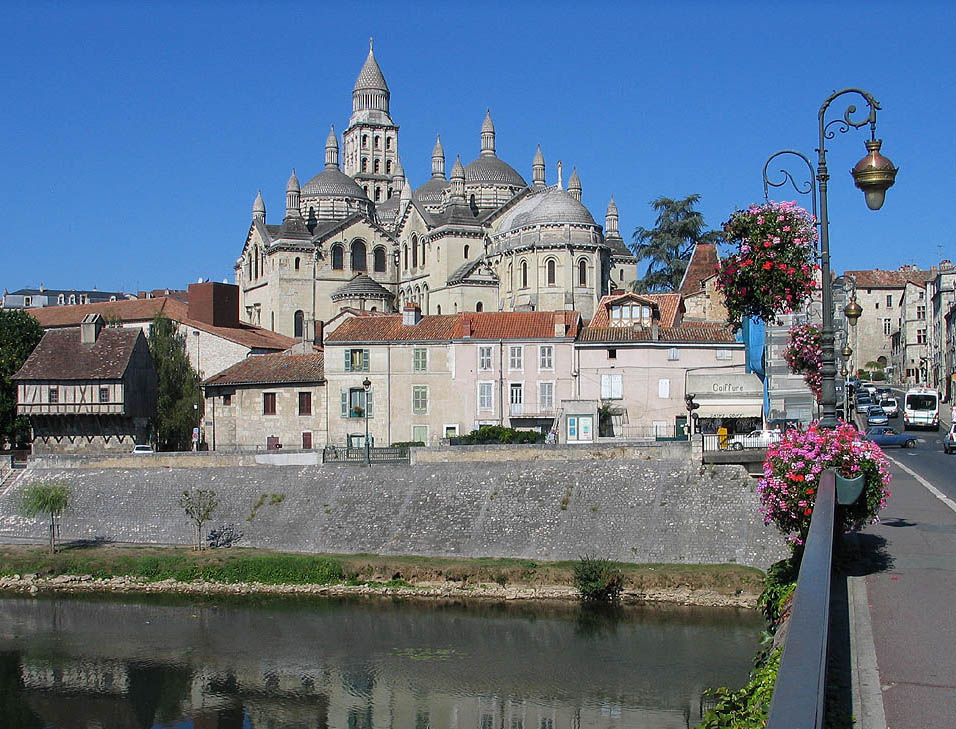
Five domes and bell tower of Saint-Front Cathedral in Périgueux

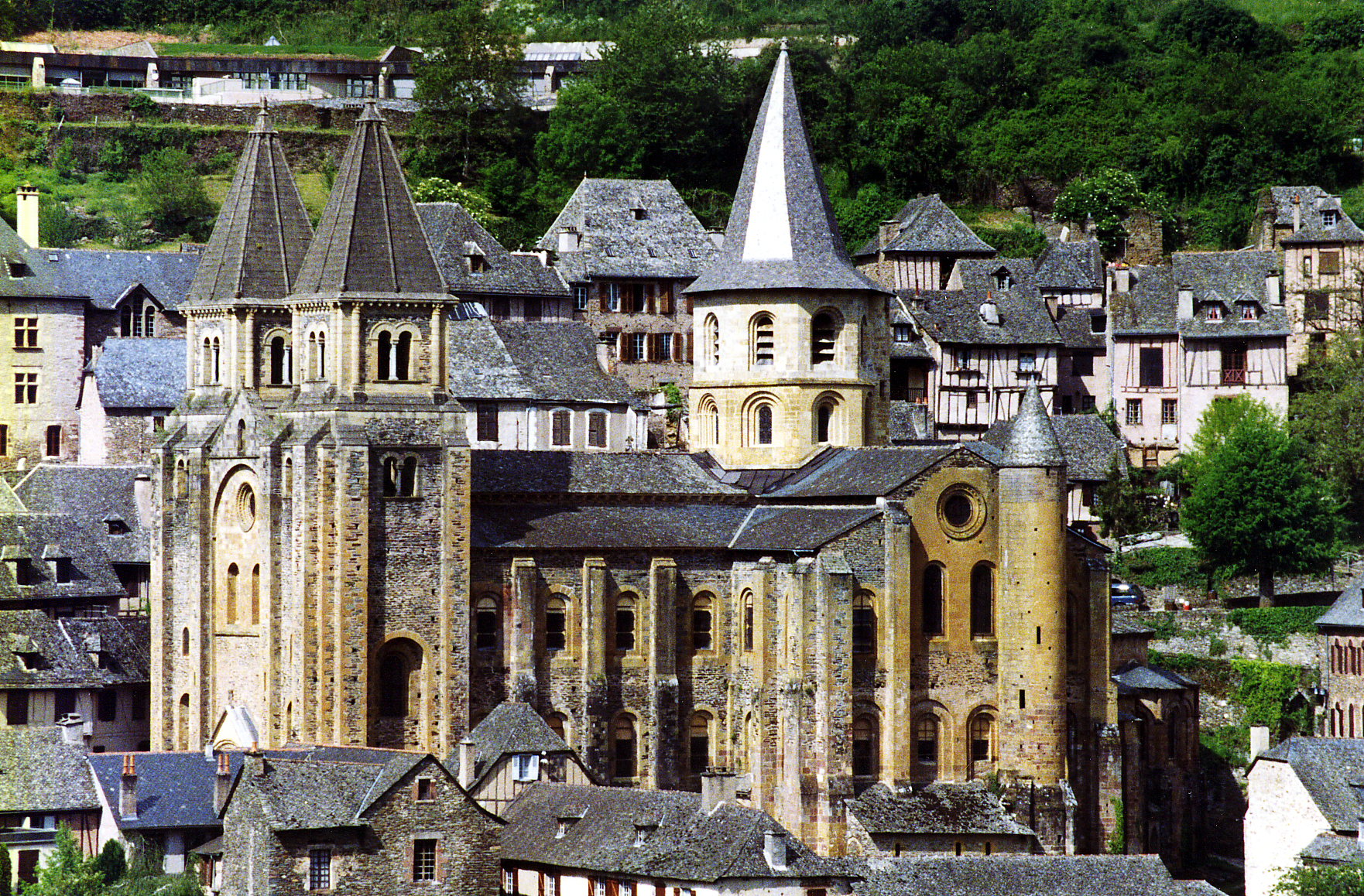
Abbey Church of Saint Foy in Conques (11th–12th century)

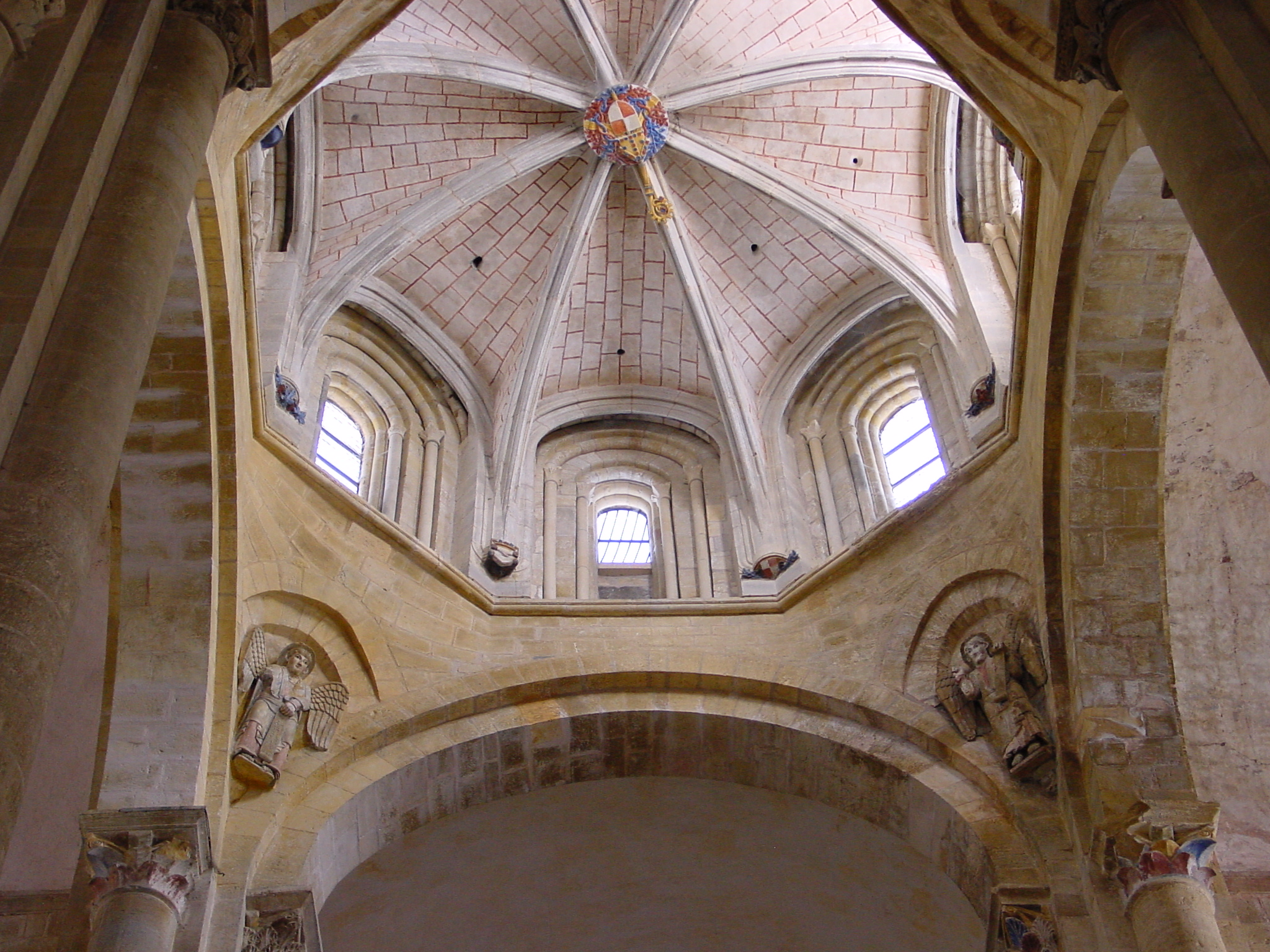
The lantern of the Abbey Church of Sainte-Foy in Conques (11th–12th century) The squinches joining the supporting arches of the lantern are decorated with sculpture of the Apostles. The base is Romanesque, while the lantern itself is later Gothic.

== History ==
=== Early Romanesque and the Meridional style ===
The Romanesque style in France developed first in the south of France, particularly in the provinces bordering on Catalonia. Among the best surviving examples are the church and cloister of the Abbey of Saint-Michel de Cuxa, built between 956 and 974. Churches in this region followed the plan of a basilica, with a small or no transept, They were built of massive stones, with little or no decoration on the interior walls. The bells were usually located in a separate tower, decorated with Lombard bands. The cloister of Saint-Michel de Cuxa, built in the 12th century, features columns of rose-colored marble and carved capitals in vegetal and animal shapes on the columns.

Around the year 1000, The architects of the abbeys in Burgundy began experimenting with different forms of vaulted ceilings, at first largely to avoid the danger of fires on the wooden roofs. The church of the Benedictine Abbey of Saint-Philibert de Tournus was an early example. The nave was covered by transversal barrel vaults, perpendicular to the axis of the nave, supported by rows of columns. The weight of the roof pressed down on the columns, not on the walls, This meant that the walls could be thinner, and could have larger windows, filling the church with more light.

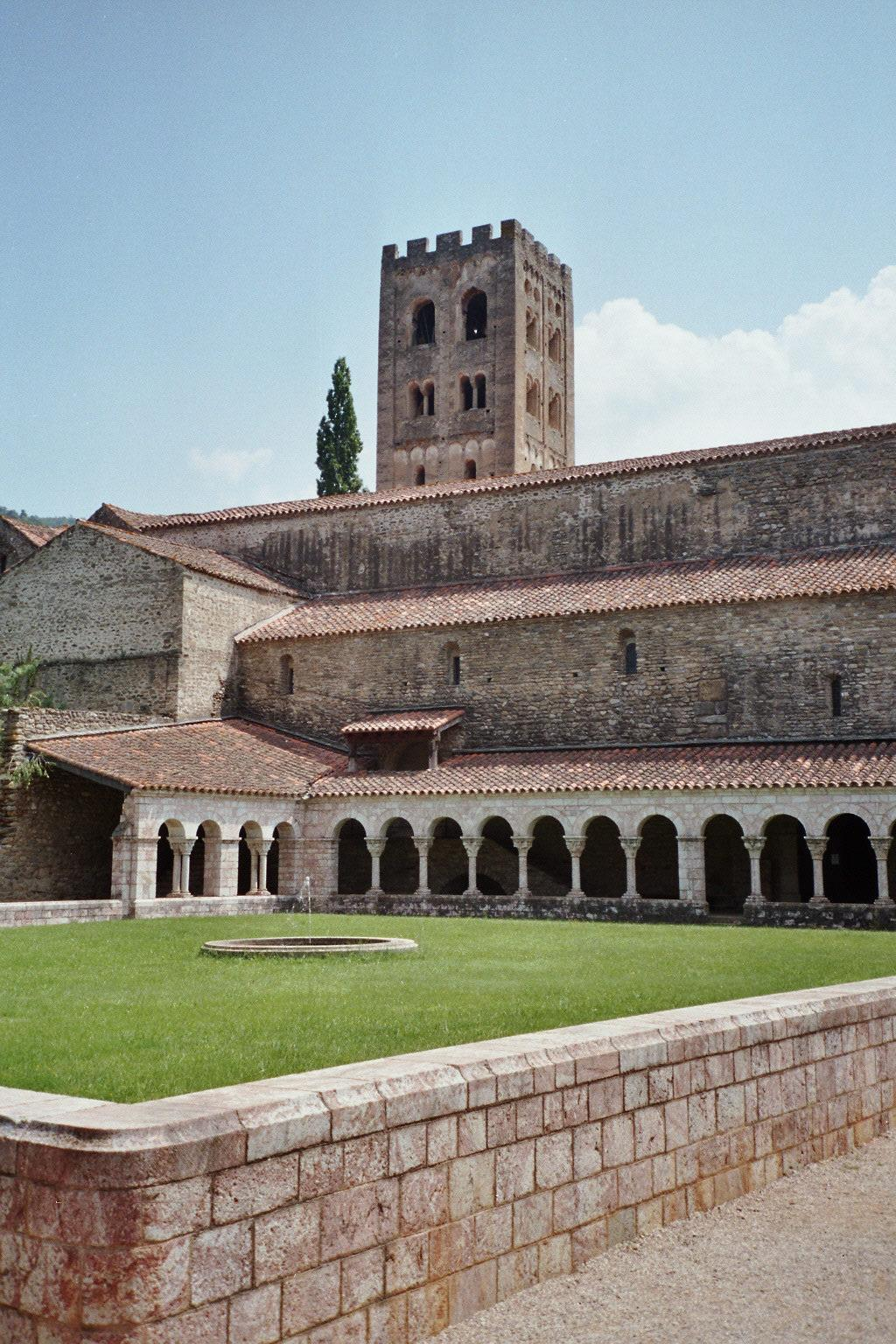
Abbey of Saint-Michel-de-Cuxa in French Catalonia, with a bell tower separate from the church (middle of 10th century)

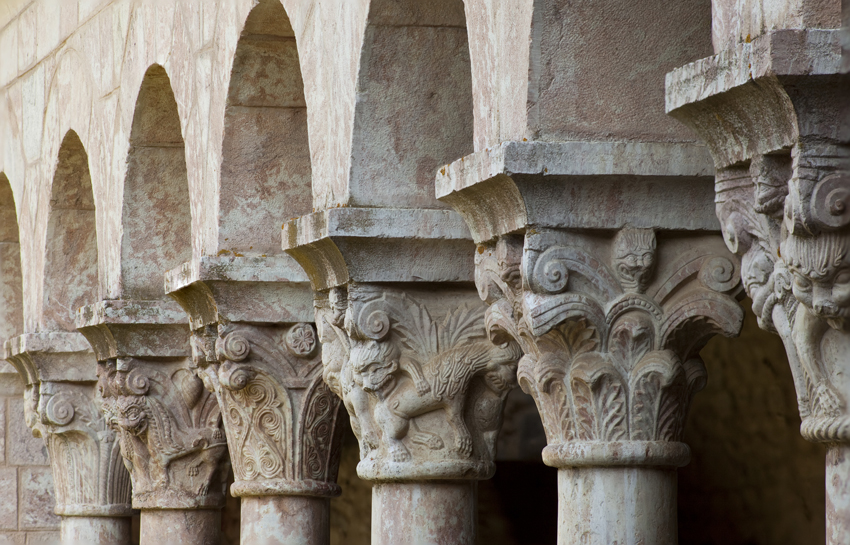
Capitals of columns in the cloister of the Abbey of Saint-Michel-de-Cuxa

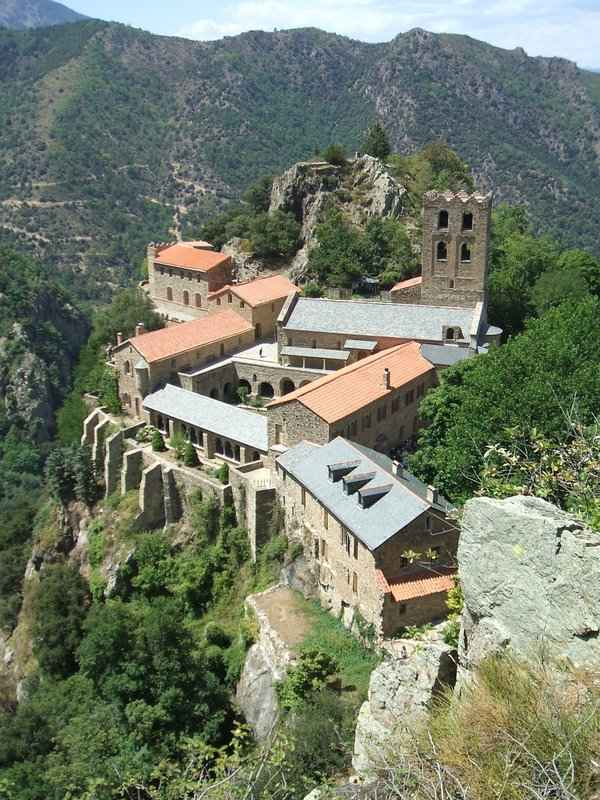
Abbey of Saint-Martin du Canigou, in the Pyrenees (beginning of 11th century)

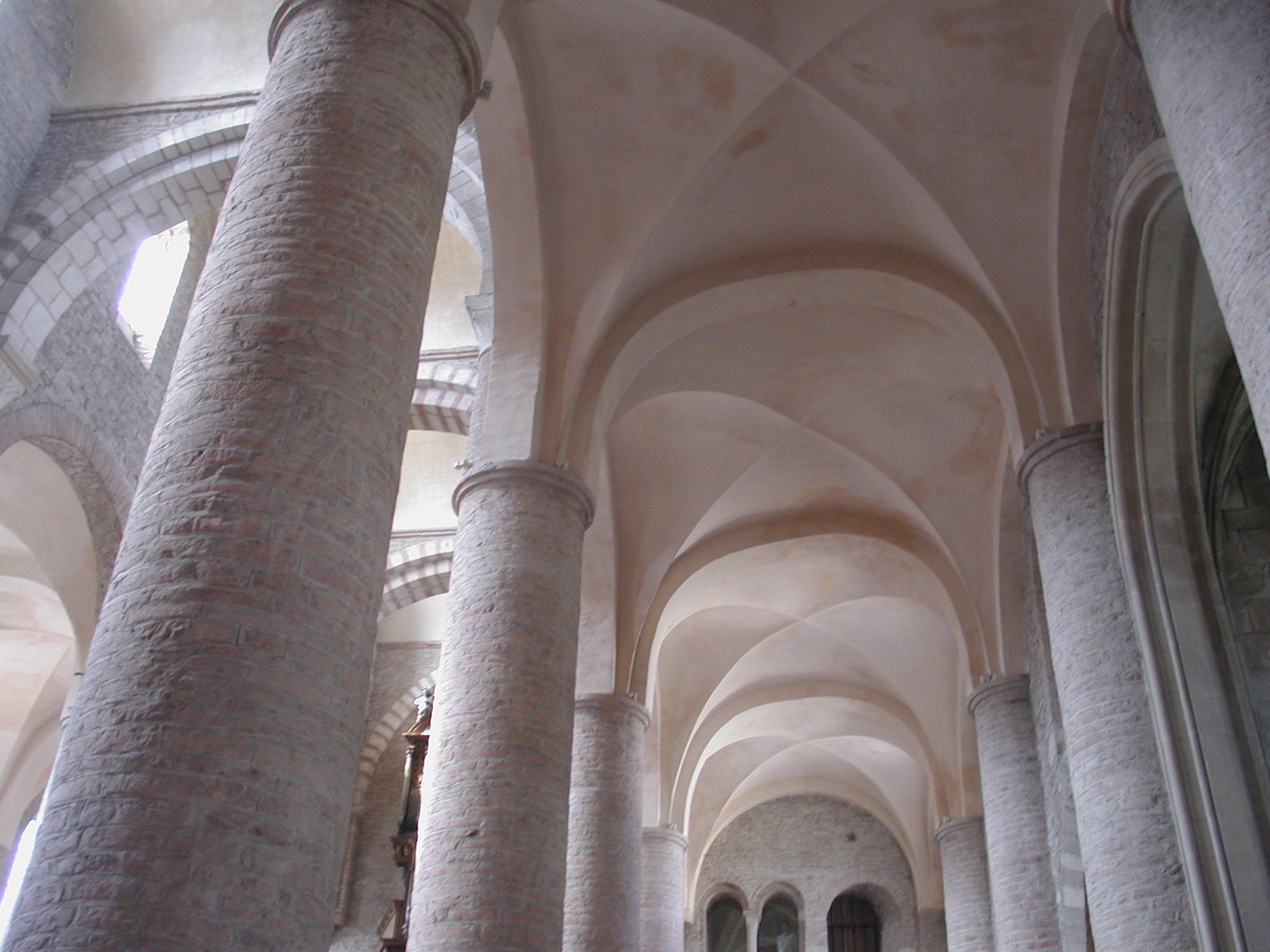
Barrel vaulted ceiling in the Church of Saint-Philibert de Tournus in Tournus, Burgundy (beginning of 11th century)

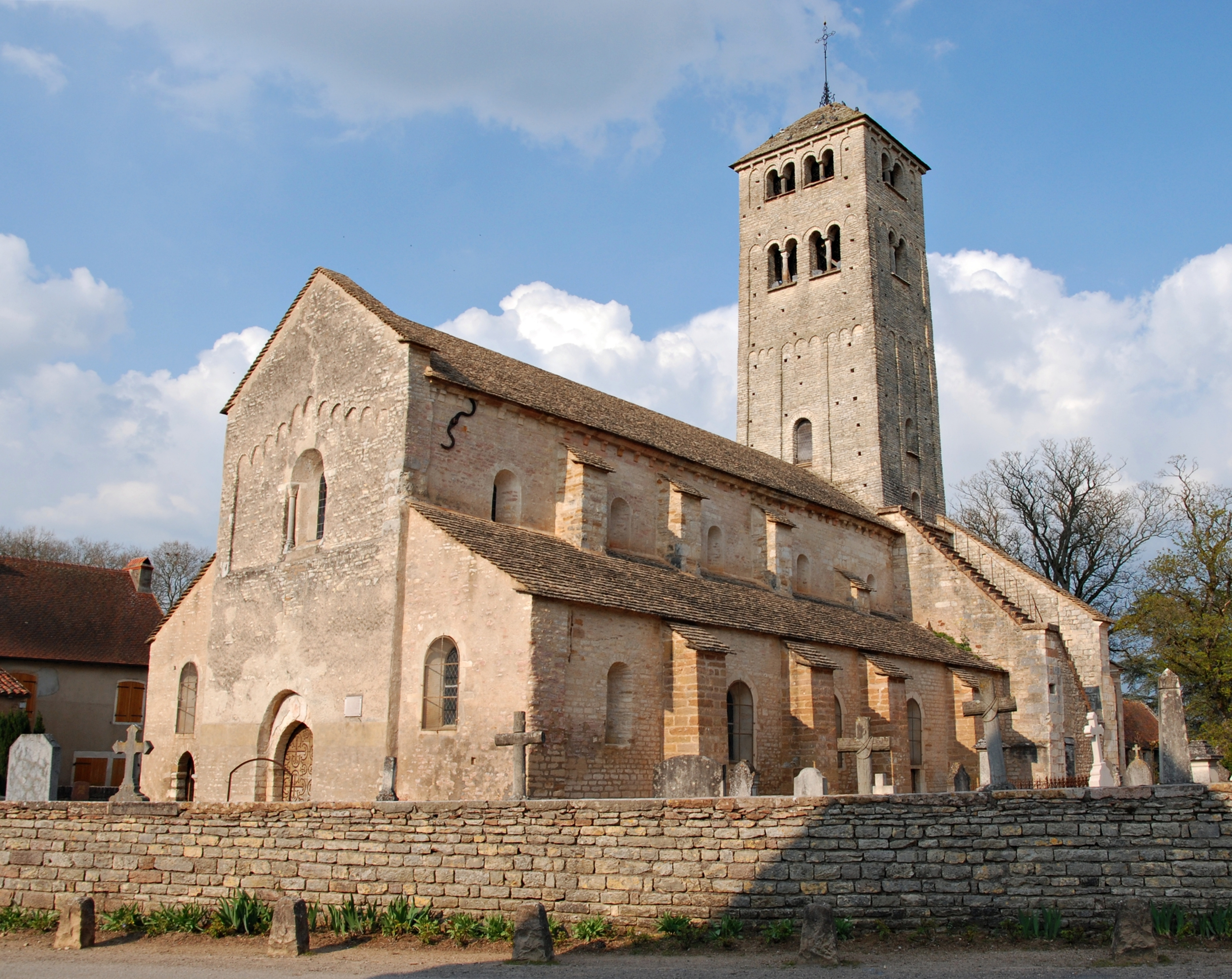
Church of Saint-Martin, Chapaize, Ssone-et-Loire (about 1030)

=== Late Romanesque – Benedictine abbeys ===
Religious orders played a particularly important role in the development of the Romanesque style. The reorganization of the Catholic Church under Louis the Pious (813–840), and the foundation of the first monastery under the rules of Saint Benedict (817), brought about important changes in religious practices and architecture. The Benedictine Abbey of Cluny, founded in 909 by William of Aquitaine, was the center of a resurgence of religious activity. In France, by the end of the 11th century, there were 815 monastic houses, and more than ten thousand monks, under the authority of the Abbot of Cluny. The flourishing of the monasteries reached a peak summit under Pope Gregory VII (1073–1085).

Cluny Abbey was the largest and most influential of the monasteries in France, both in doctrine and in architecture. The Abbot Hugues de Cluny (1049–1109) decided to reconstruct and enlarge the original Abbey, including the Abbatiale, or Abbey church. The new Abbatiale was completed in 1130. The new church was 187 meters long, and designed to accommodate two hundred and fifty monks. It contained a double transept, an avant-nave on the west, and on the east a chevet with a deambulatoire passage which gave access to five radiating chapels. The nave itself was immense, covered with a vaulted ceiling 10.85 meters wide and 25 meters high. The elevation of the nave had three levels; the windows on the upper levels brought light into the interior. It was crowned by five towers, the largest over the crossing of grand transept, two on either side of the entrance to the avant-nave, and two on the arms of the transept. Its gigantic proportions were not surpassed until the reconstruction of Saint Peter's Basilica in Rome in the 16th century.

Cluny Abbey was almost entirely destroyed during and after the French Revolution; the stones were reused in buildings across the region. The only remaining structures are the two towers of the avant-nave, and the bell tower on the south wing of the grand transept. Eight percent of the original structure remains today.

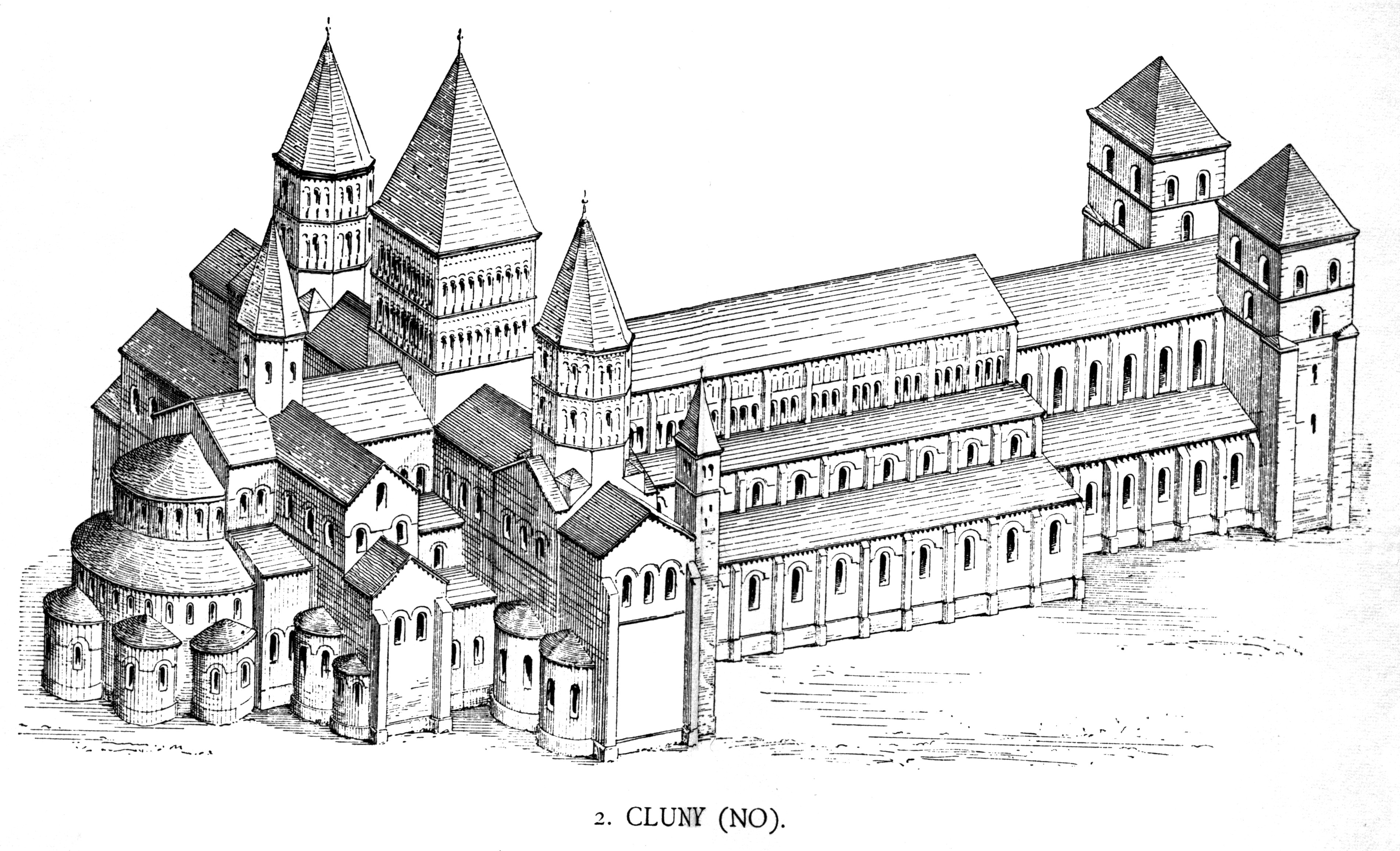
Cluny Abbey as it appeared in the 12th century (1080–1810)

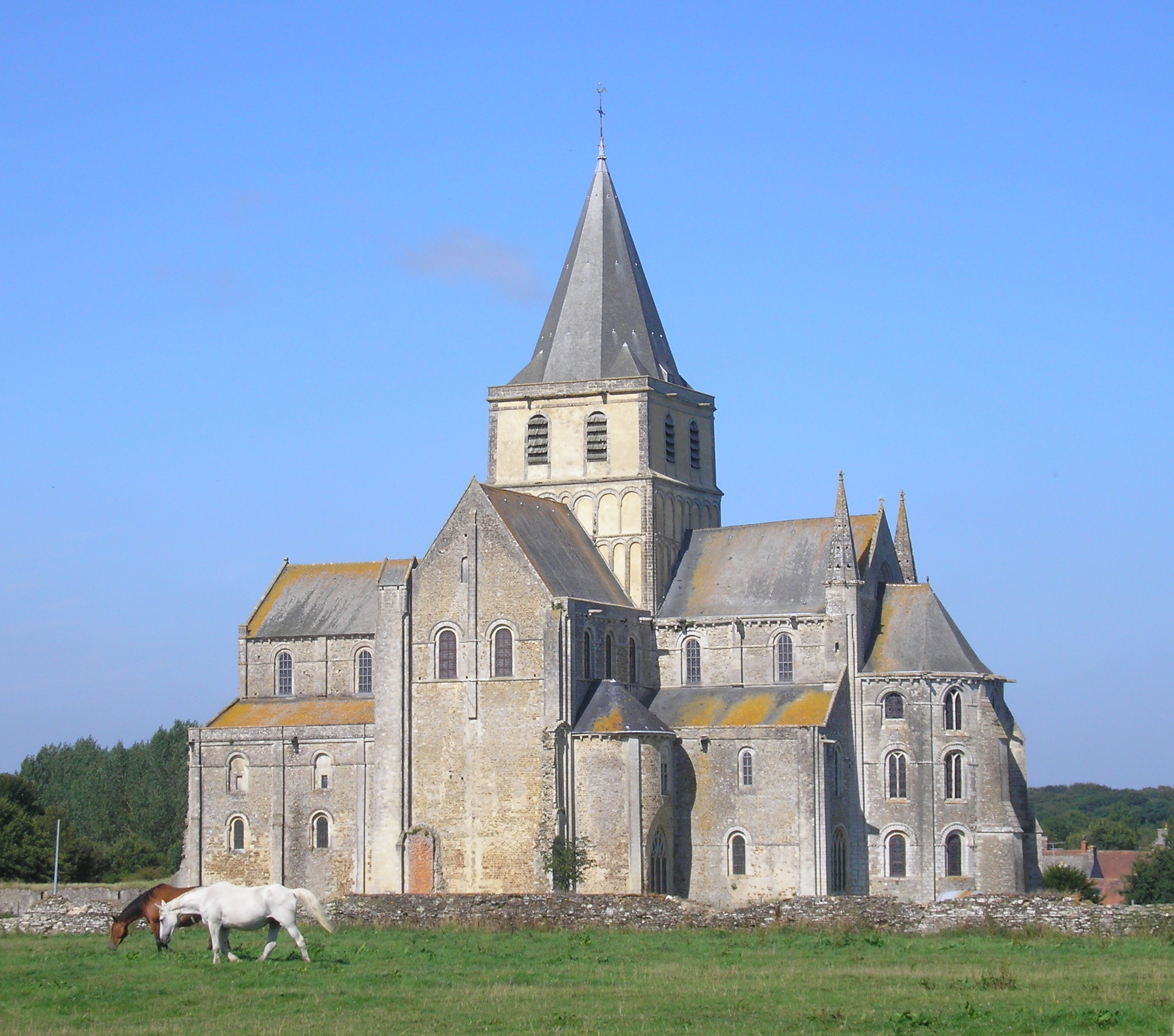
Benedictine Abbey of Saint-Vigor de Cerisy (1080–1085)

=== Cistercian monasteries ===
The Cistercian monastic order was created by Saint Bernard of Clairvaux in 1098; its first monastery was Cîteaux Abbey. Its principal doctrines were defined by Saint Benedict as separation from society, working for the necessities of life, and the refusal of anything unneeded for the first two. The architecture of the new monasteries was designed to comply with these rules. The monasteries were built as far as possible from cities. The monks lived in unadorned buildings constructed around a cloister, isolated from the outside world and from other parts of the monastery. The monks had individual cells, each with three small rooms; The "Ave Maria" for prayer; a second room with a desk and an alive for a bed; and a third room for a workshop. Each later had its own garden. A second building contained the common areas for the monks; a church, the cloister, the capitulary or meeting room; the kitchen and dining room. A third building was added for converts who were not monks, but who wanted to share the monastic life. The order expanded to five monasteries; in France: Cîteaux Abbey, Clairvaux Abbey, Morimond Abbey, Pontigny Abbey, and La Ferté Abbey. These five became the "Mother houses" for new Cistercian monasteries across the European continent and in England. After the death of Saint Bernard in 1153, the standard church architecture was modified; the hemispherical or square sanctuary of the church was replaced by a chevet with an ambulatory to pass from chapel to chapel.

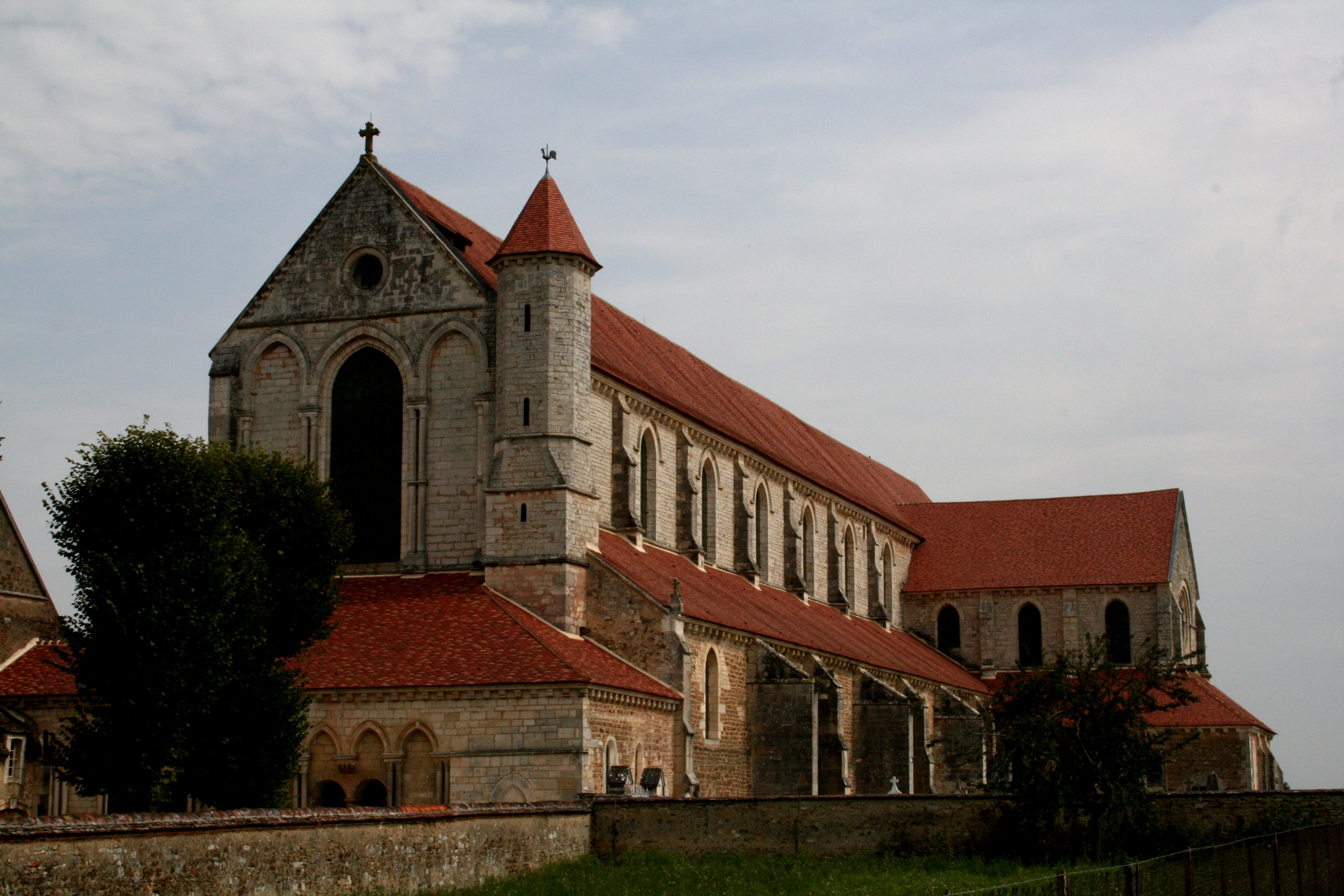
Pontigny Abbey church (founded 1114)

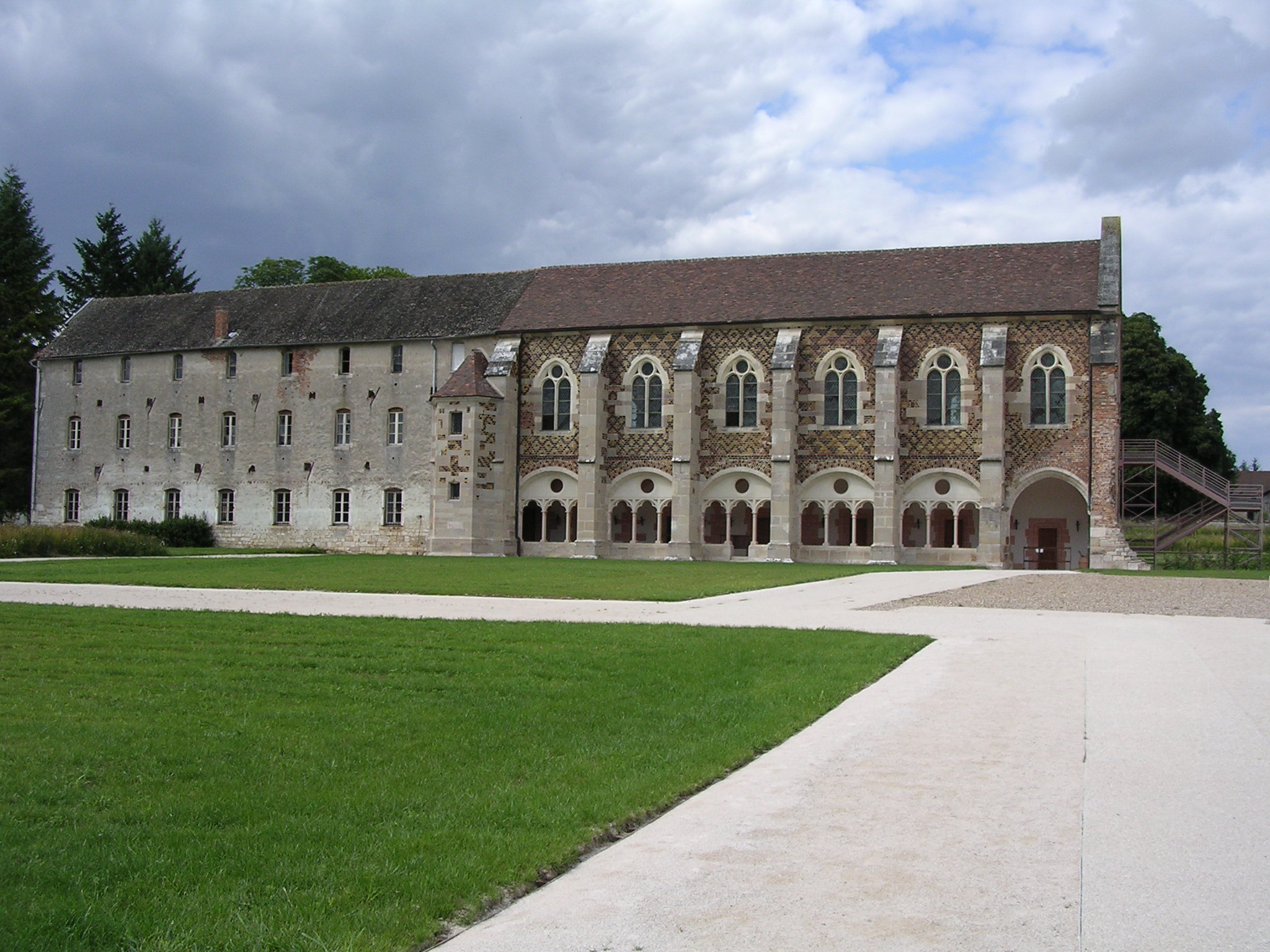
The library of Cîteaux Abbey (founded 1098)

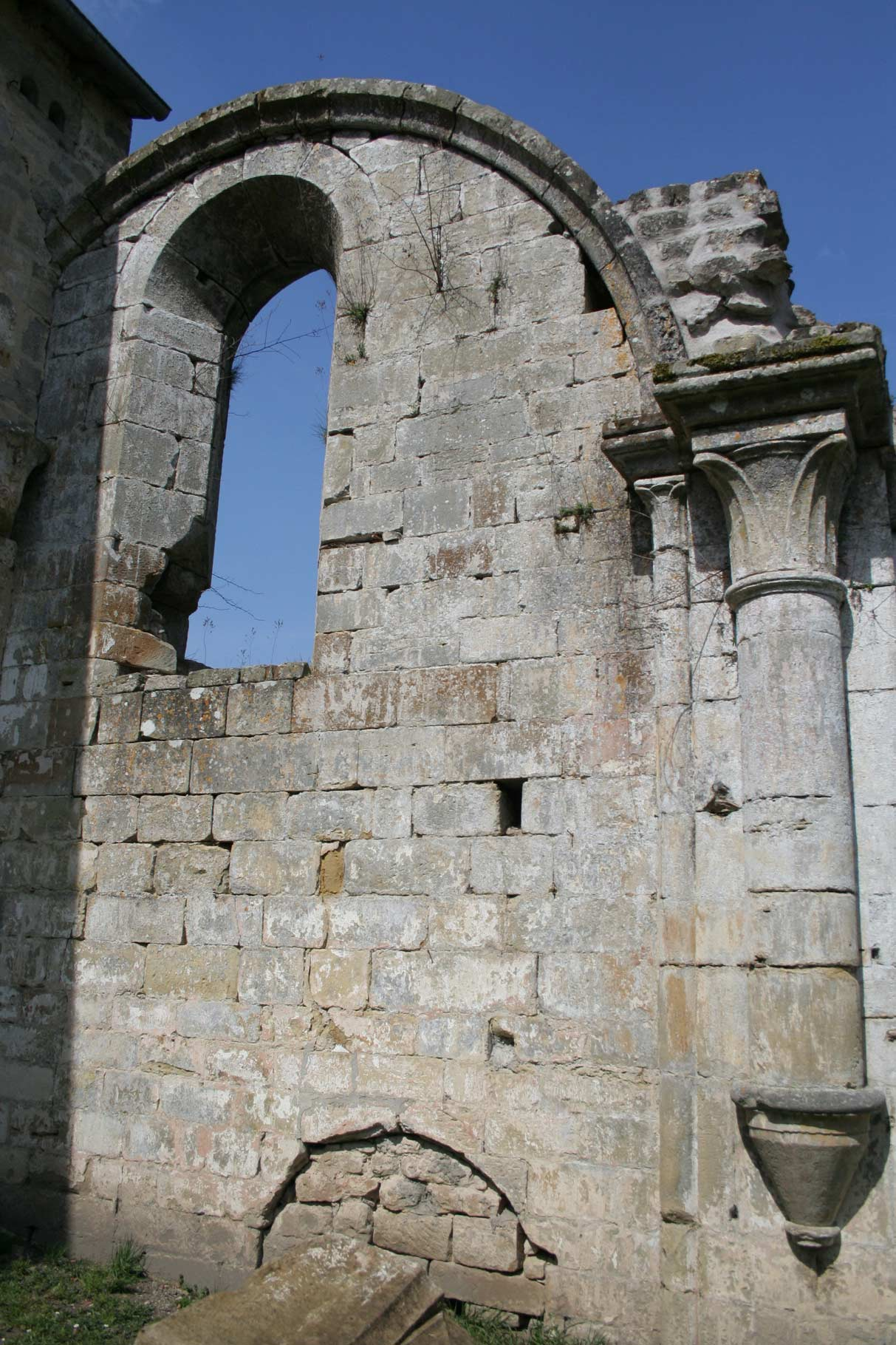
Ruins of Morimond Abbey (founded 1115)

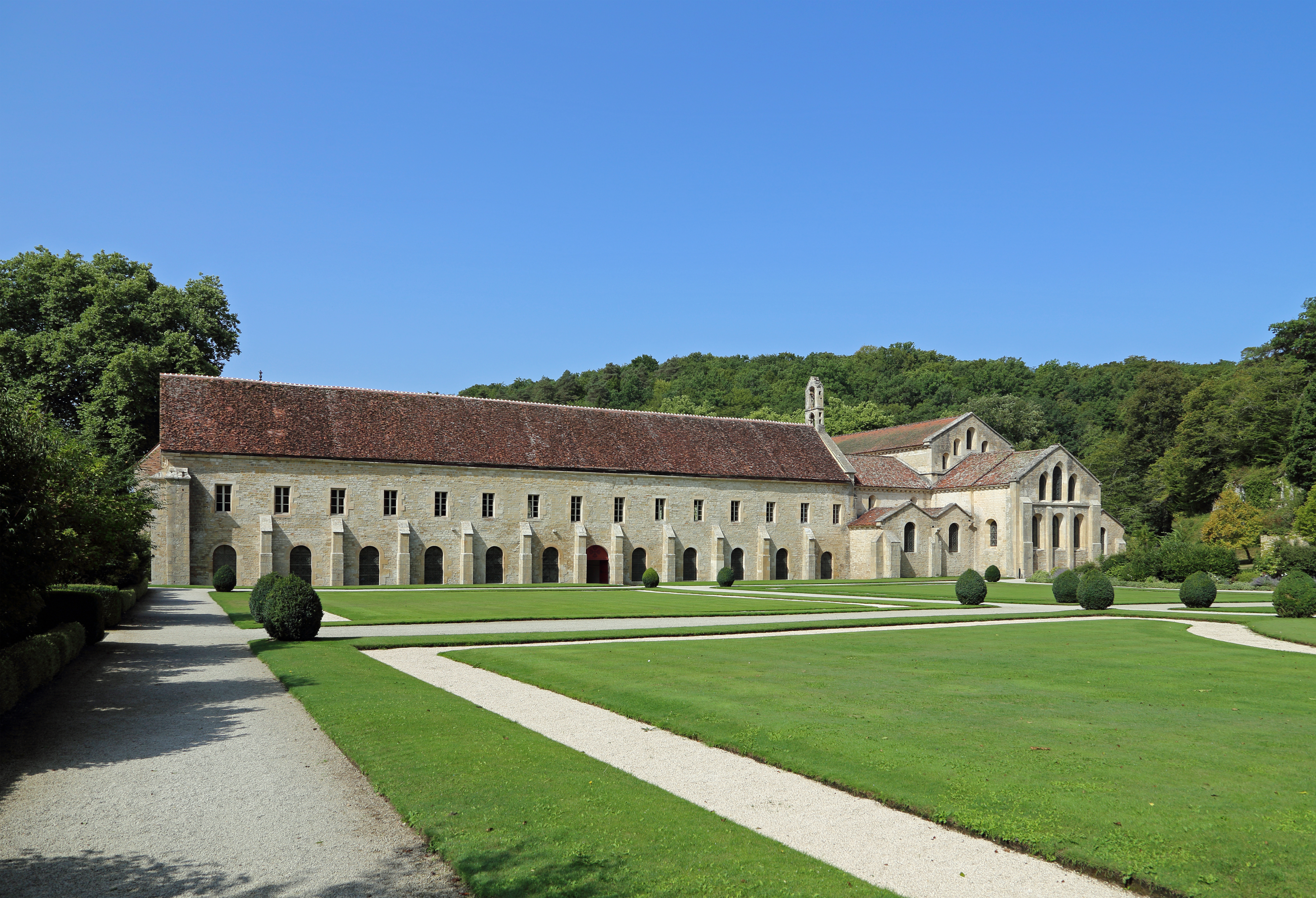
Abbey of Fontenay (founded 1118)

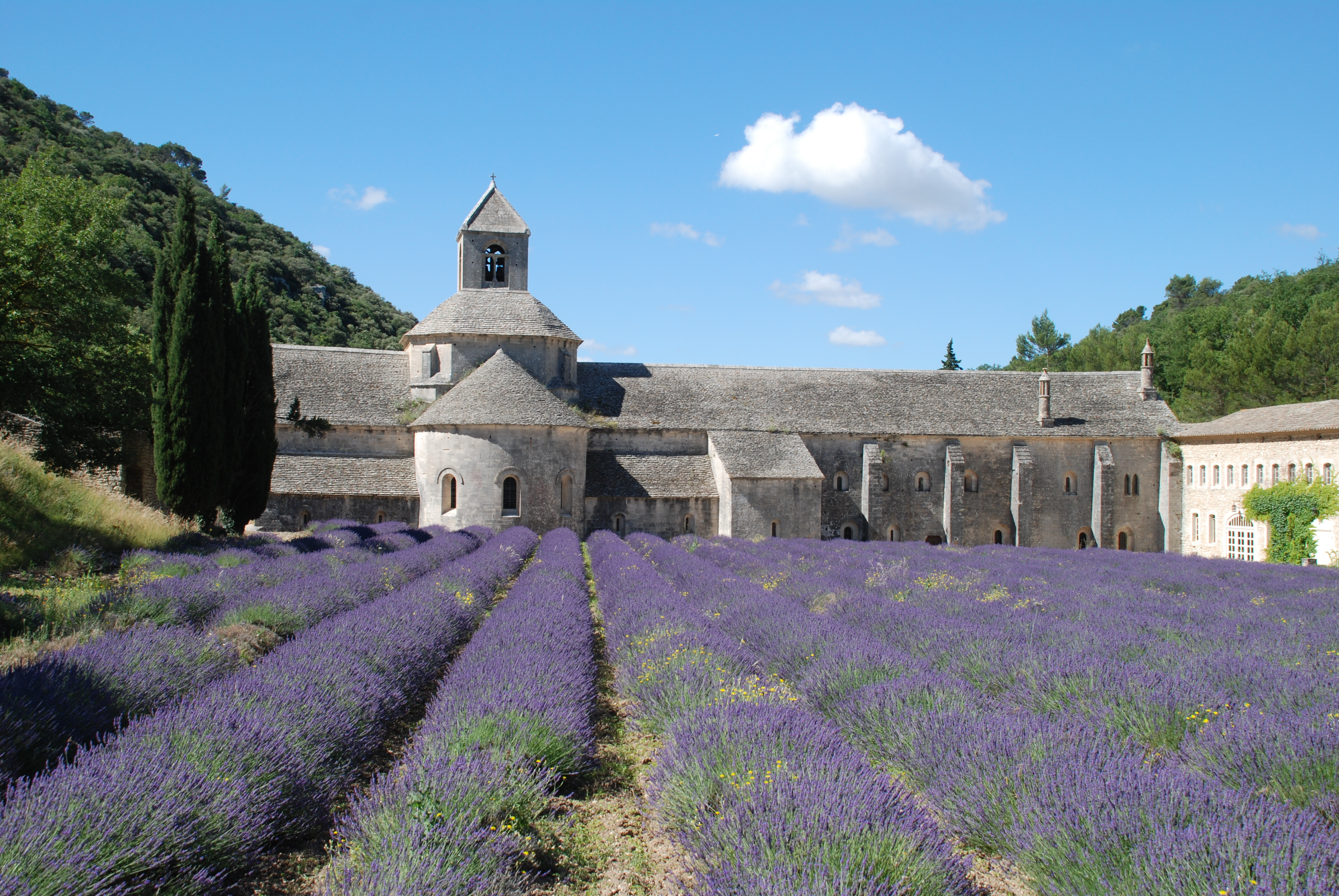
Sénanque Abbey (founded 1148) is an example of Romanesque architecture of Provence

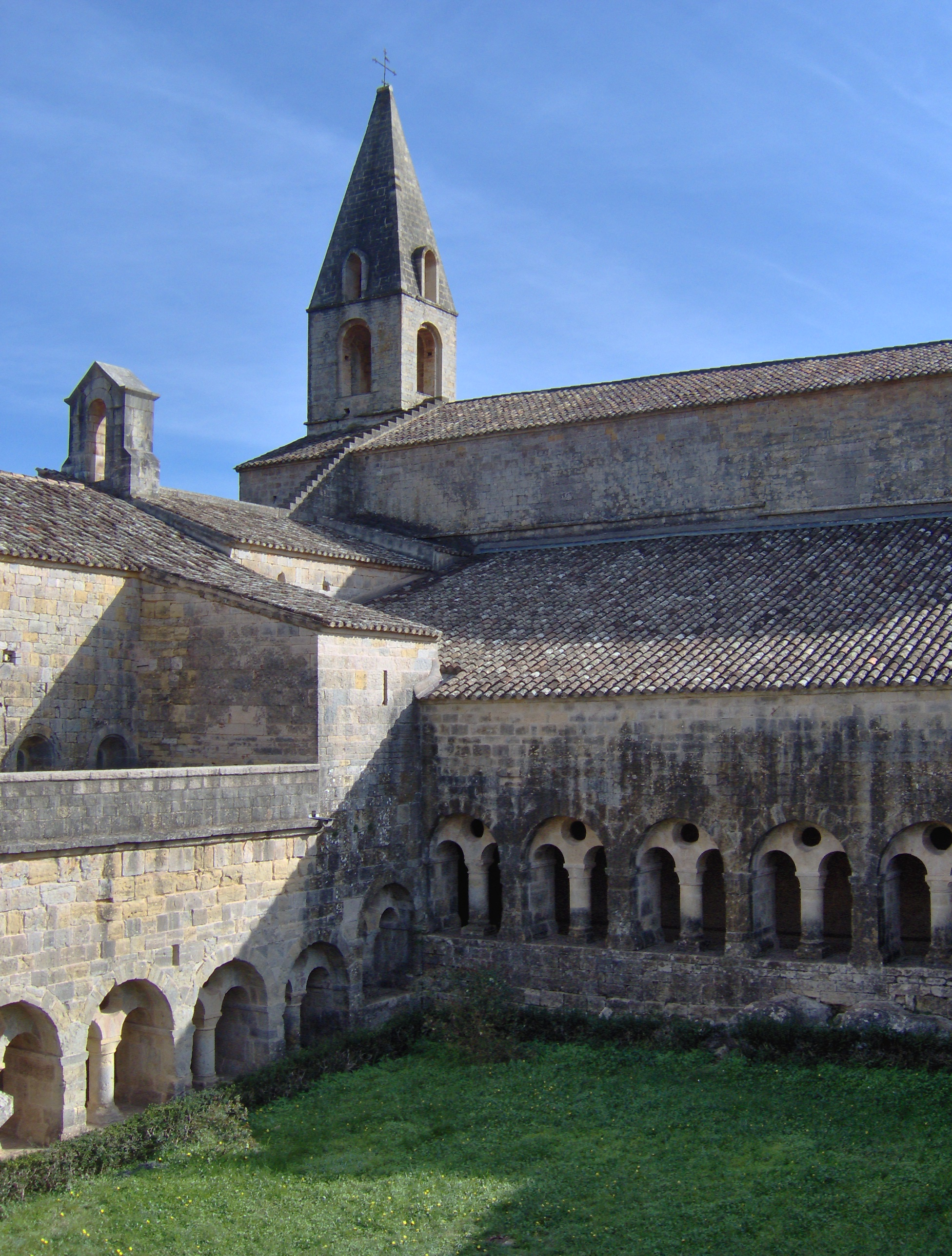
Thoronet Abbey in Provence (1176–1200)

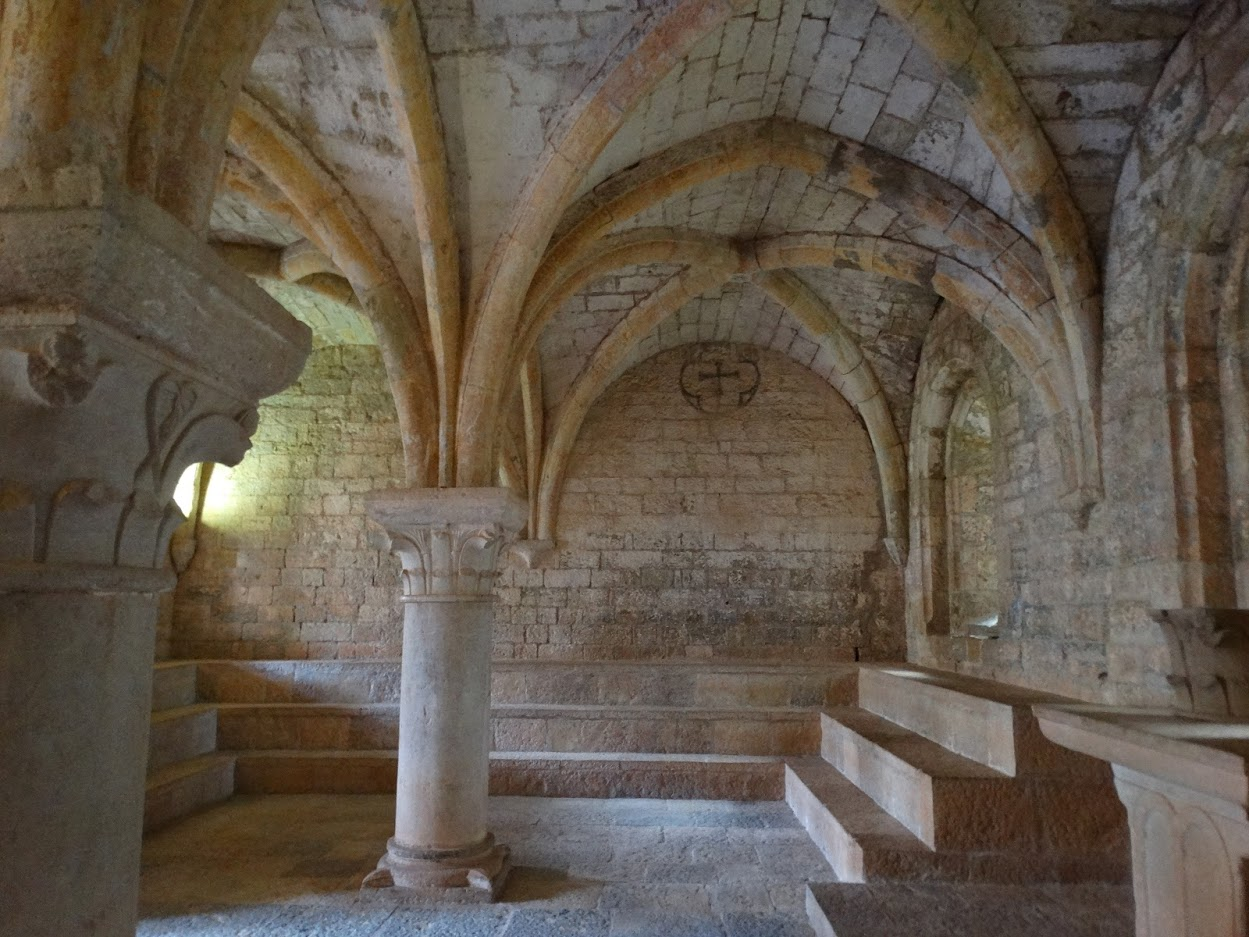
The vaulted ceiling of the chapter house of Thoronet Abbey, where the monks met daily

=== Pilgrimage churches ===
In the second period of Romanesque, beginning in the last third of the 11th century, many romanesque churches in France were built along the pilgrimage routes that Santiago de Compostela in Spain, where the reputed relics of Saint James the Great were displayed. With the fall of Jerusalem under Islamic rule, the route to Santiago de Compostela became one of the two most important pilgrimage routes in Europe, beside the pilgrimage to the tomb of Saint Peter in Rome. Churches along the route, included the Saint-Foy-de-Conques, were designed to provide space for large numbers of worshippers. The large pilgrimage churches featured a deambulatoire or columned passage around the choir, providing access to a series of small chapels, and even larger pilgrimage church like the basilica of Saint-Sernin has double side aisles to facilitate the movement of pilgrims. Another smaller notable church on the route was the Abbey of Saint-Nectaire in Puy-de-Dôme, begun in 1080. Another important church on the route was Le Puy Cathedral, built in the 11th and 12th century.

Another feature of the later Romanesque churches was greater height. These churches had a tribune or gallery on the level above the ground floor, where worshippers could look down into the nave. The tribune provided greater stability and support for the high roof. In the Auvergne, the churches added another level; above the gallery there was another level of vaulted tribunes. These churches had great height but little light penetrated into the nave. In other regions, such as Poitou, the tribunes and arcades were replaced by high windows bringing light directly into the nave.

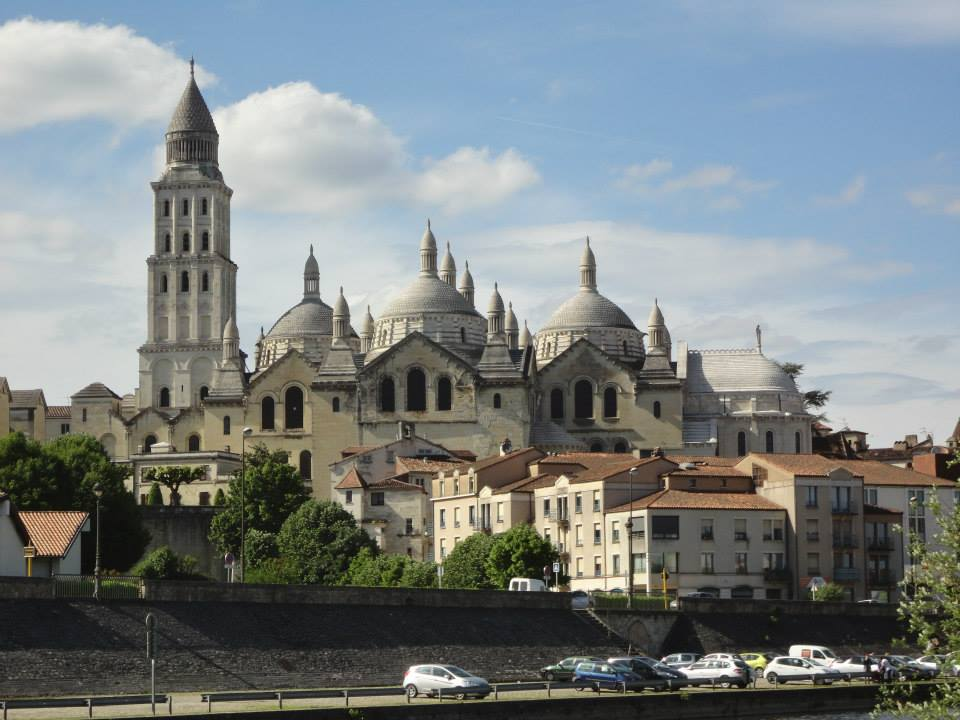
Saint-Front Cathedral in Périgueux, with five cupolas (11th century) The elongated domes were added in the 19th century by Paul Abadie, architect of Sacré-Cœur, Paris

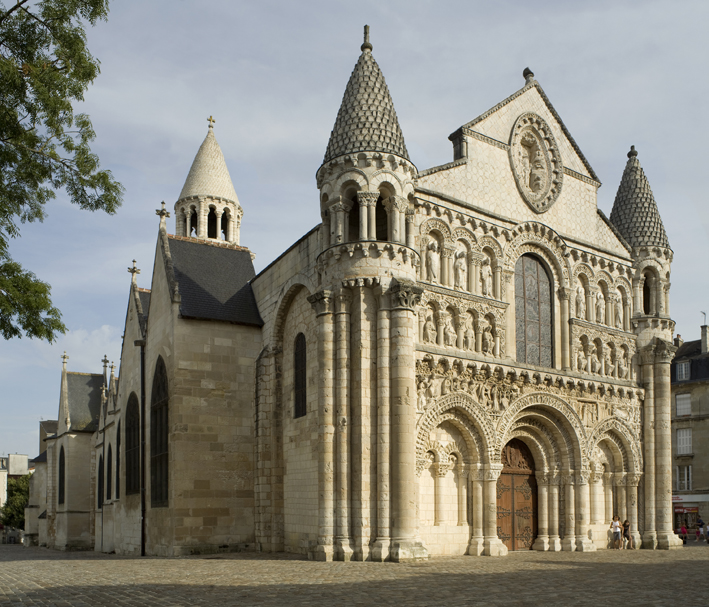
Église Notre-Dame la Grande, Poitiers

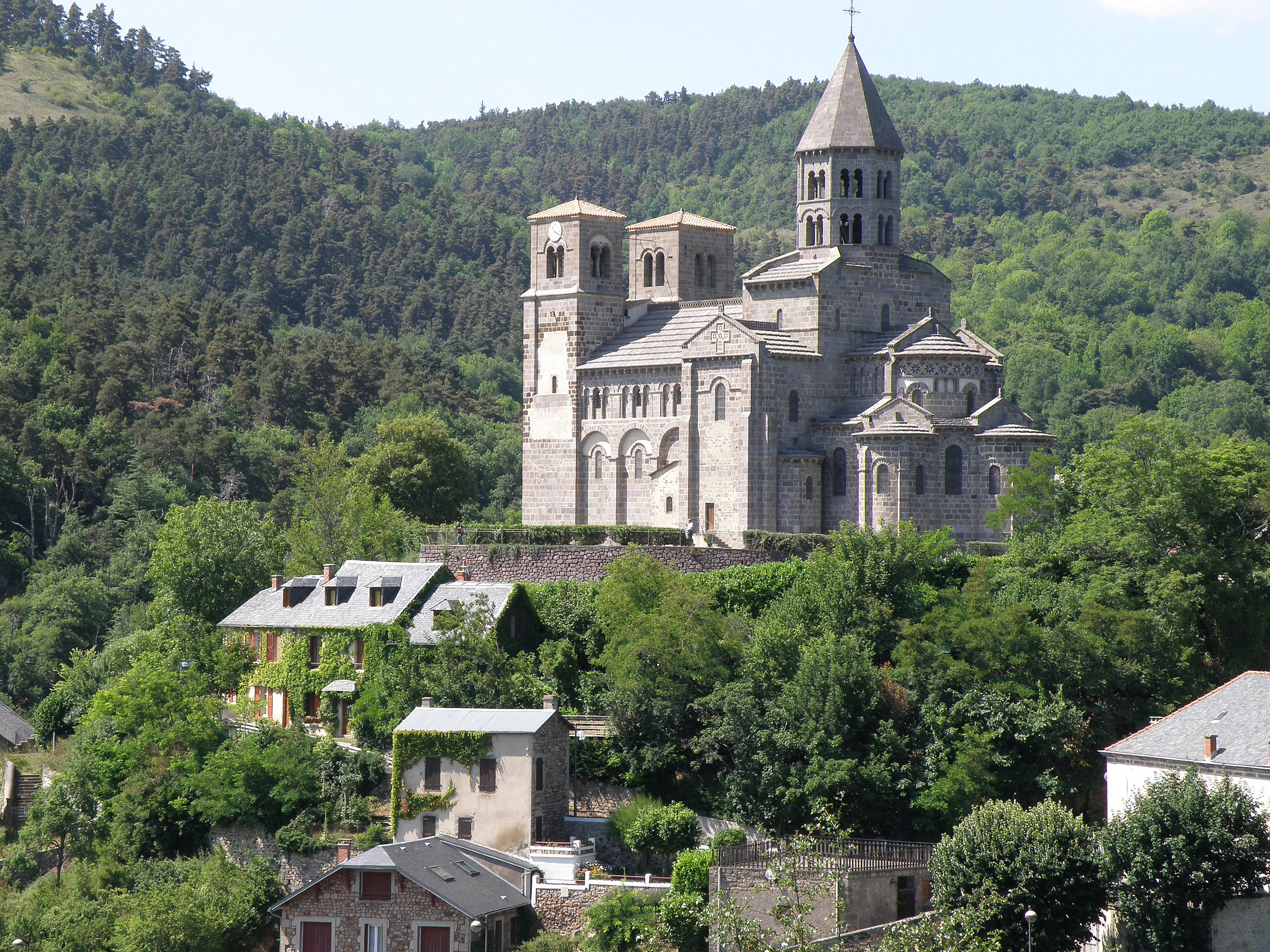
Former Abbatiale of Saint-Nectaire in Puy-de-Dôme, Auvergne (begun 1080)

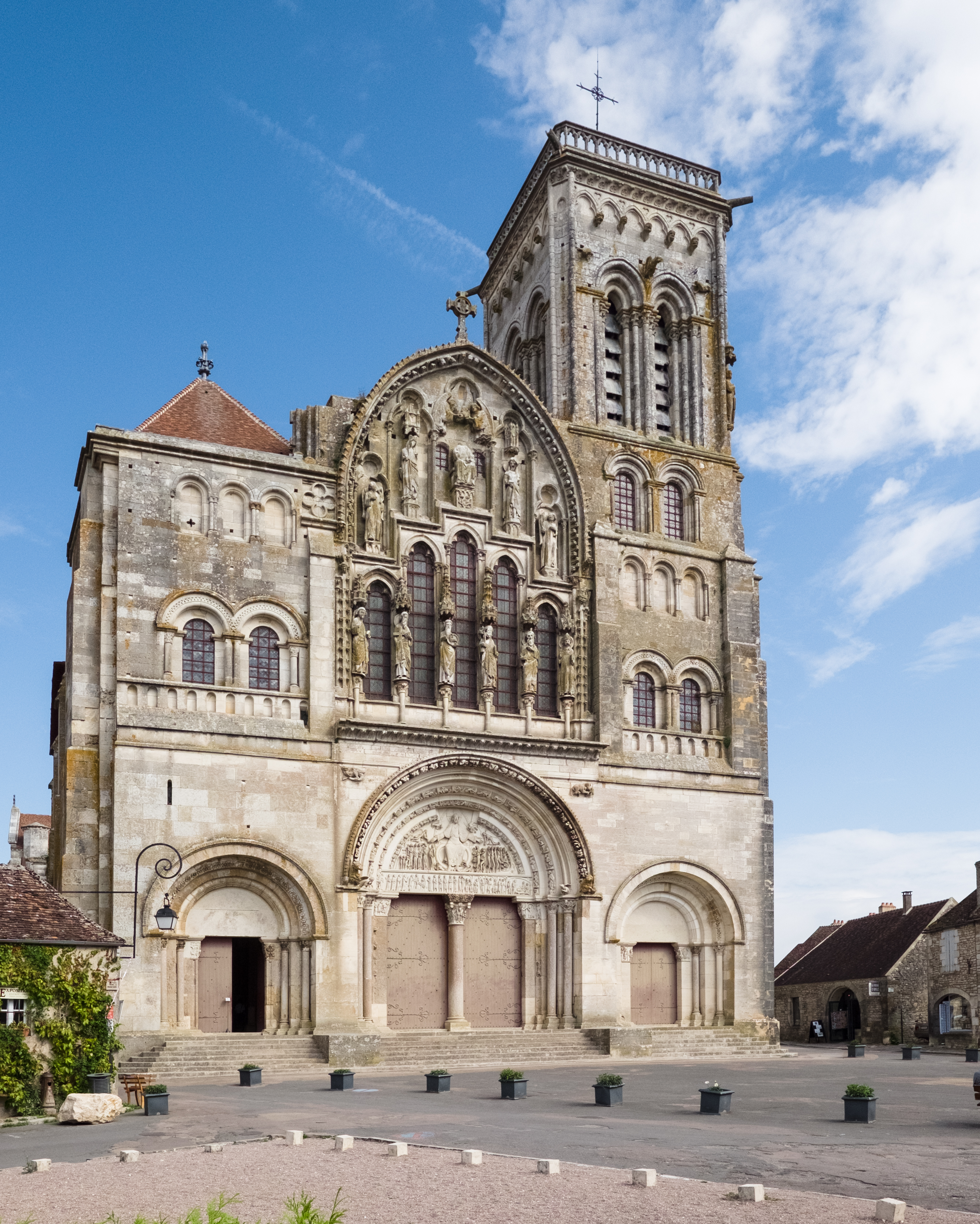
Vézelay Abbey in Burgundy (1104–1132)

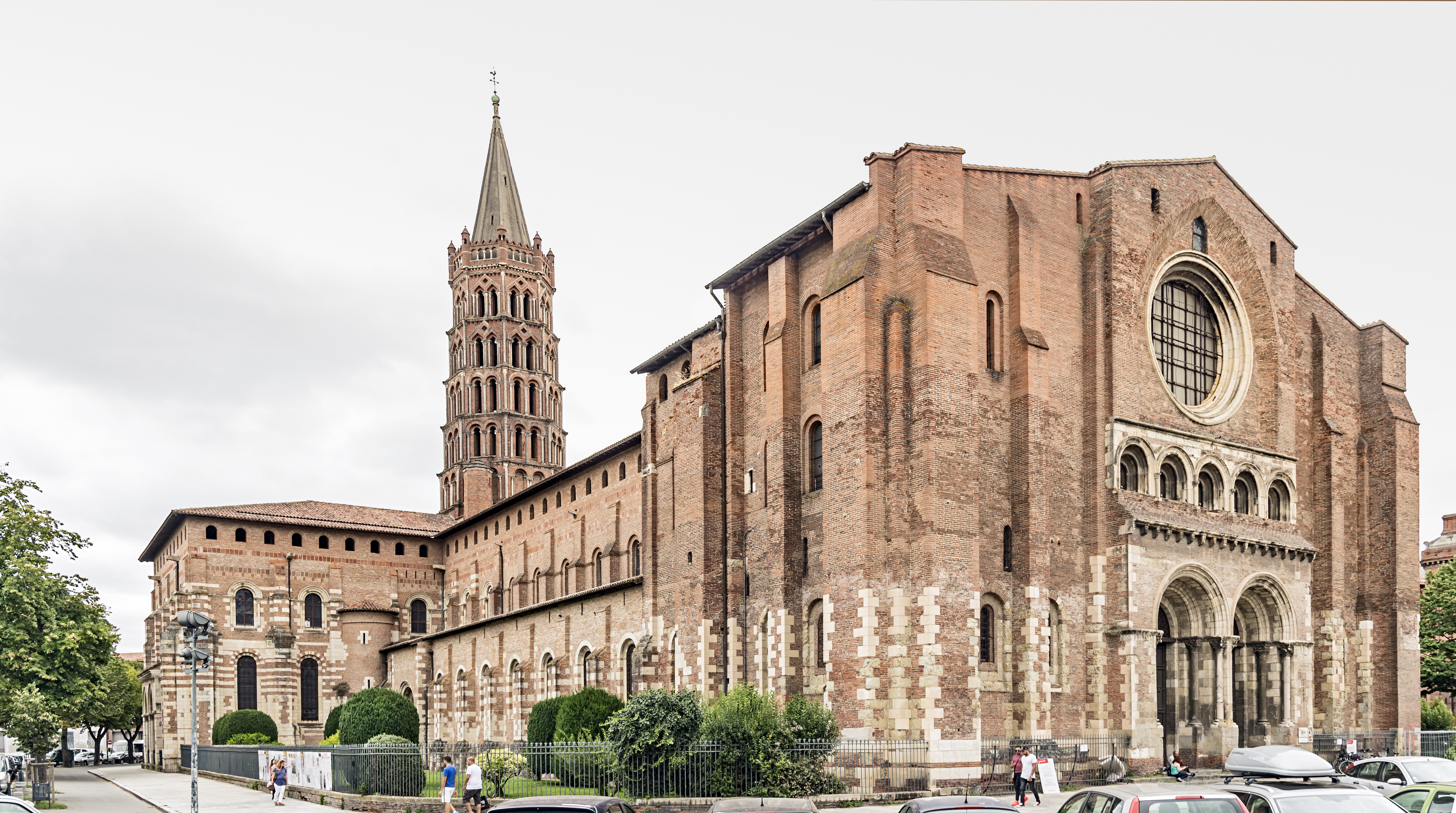
Basilica of Saint-Sernin, Toulouse

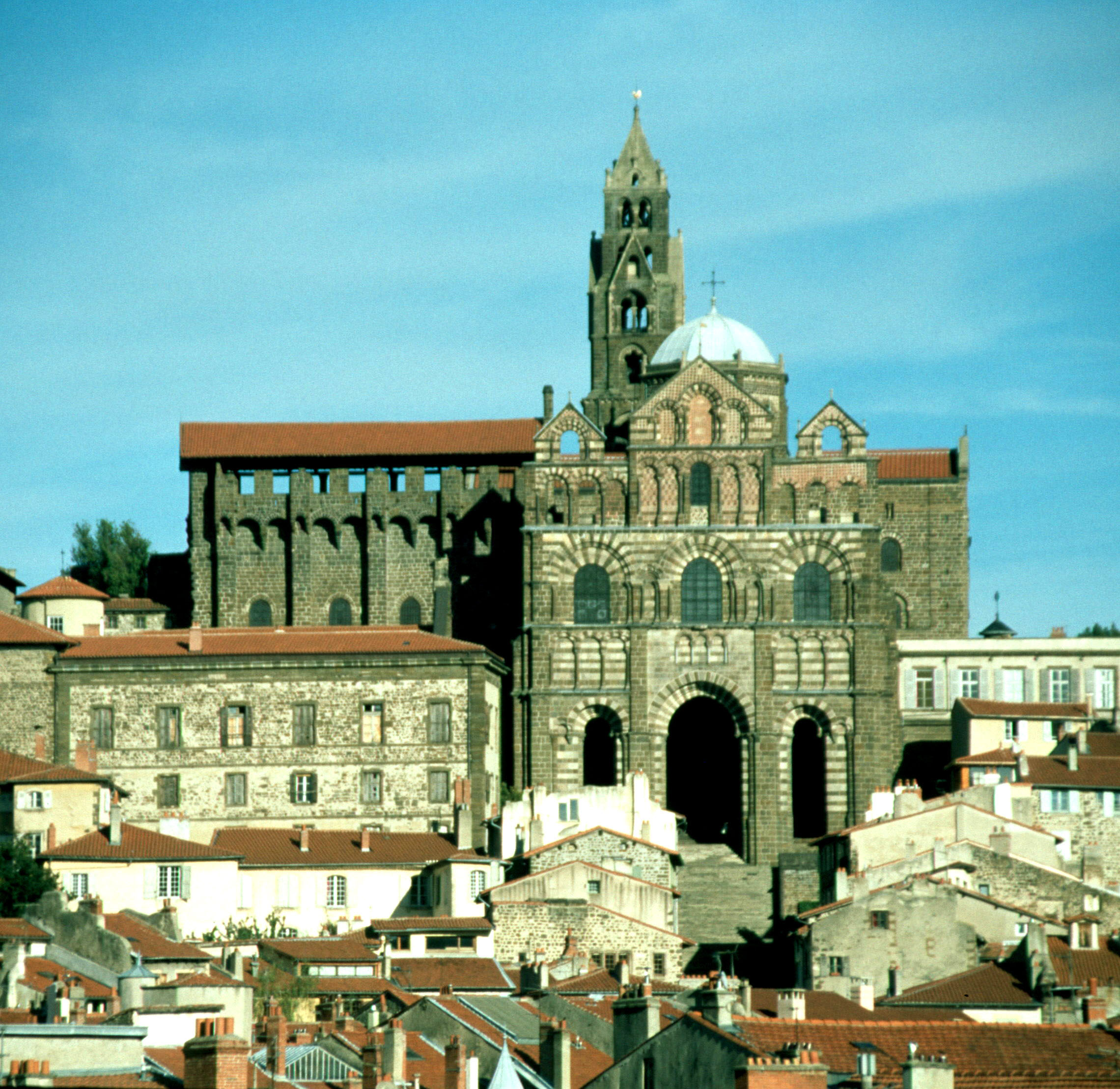
Le Puy Cathedral, a pilgrimage church en route to Santiago de Compostela

=== Romanesque in Paris ===
The Romanesque style made its first appearance in Paris with the construction of the Abbey of Saint-Germain-des-Prés. The nave was constructed between 990 and 1160, and the tower, with a high chapel on its ground floor, was built between 990 and 1014. The western portion of nave was constructed between 990 and 1160. The choir, in the center of the church, begun in 1145, was built in the new Gothic style, pioneered at the Abbey of Saint-Denis.

Other Romanesque churches in Paris include Saint-Martin-des-Champs Priory(1060–1147). The surviving buildings of the monastery now house the Musée des Arts et Métiers of Paris. The walls of choir and chapels of the church are supported by early buttresses, and it features a Romanesque bell tower. The Church of Saint-Pierre de Montmartre (1147–1200), just below the top of the hill of Montmartre, was one of the first buildings in Paris, after the Abbey of Saint-Denis, to install rib vaults, which launched the transition from the Romanesque to the Gothic.

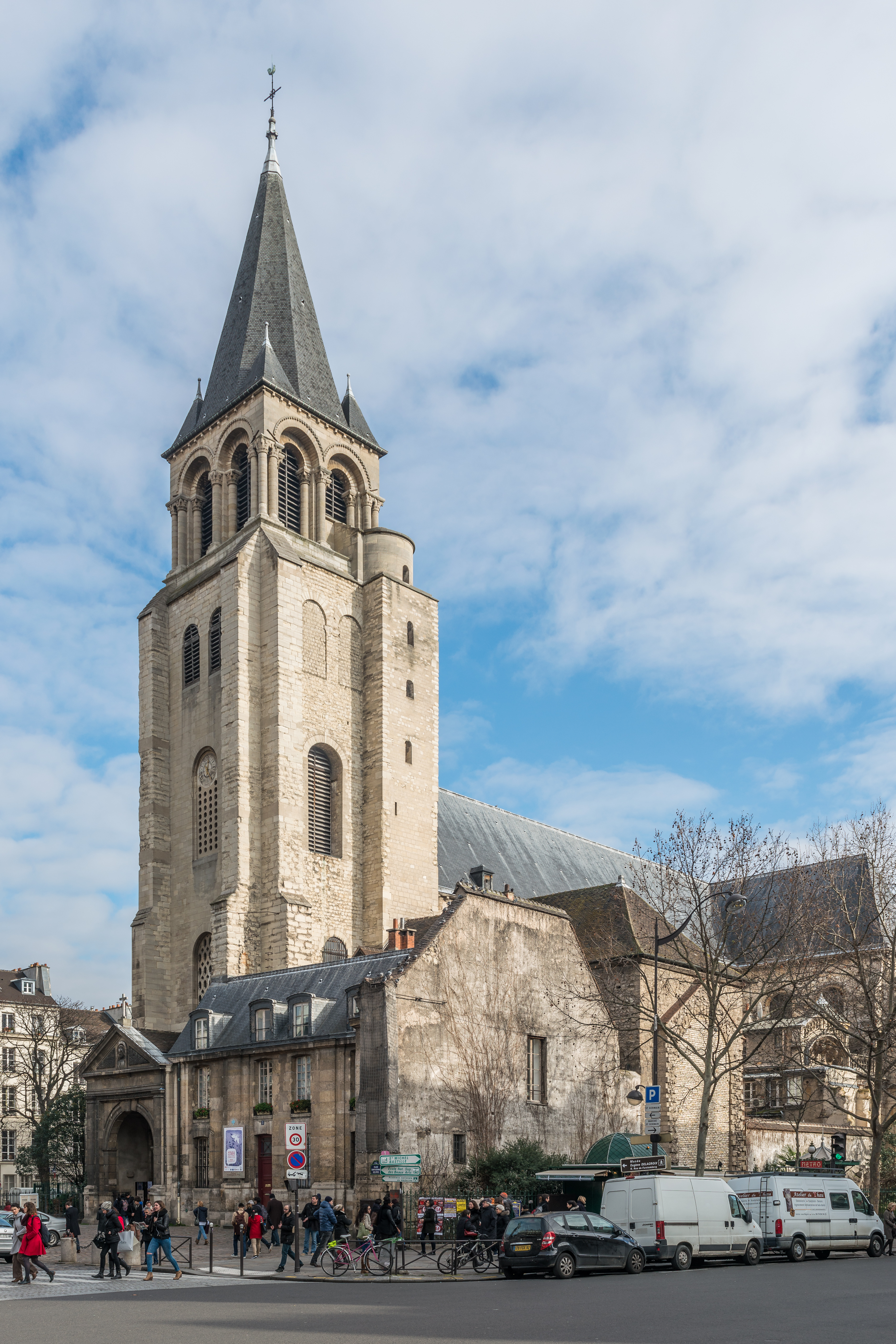
The Romanesque tower of the Abbey of Saint-Germain-des-Prés (Begun in 990)

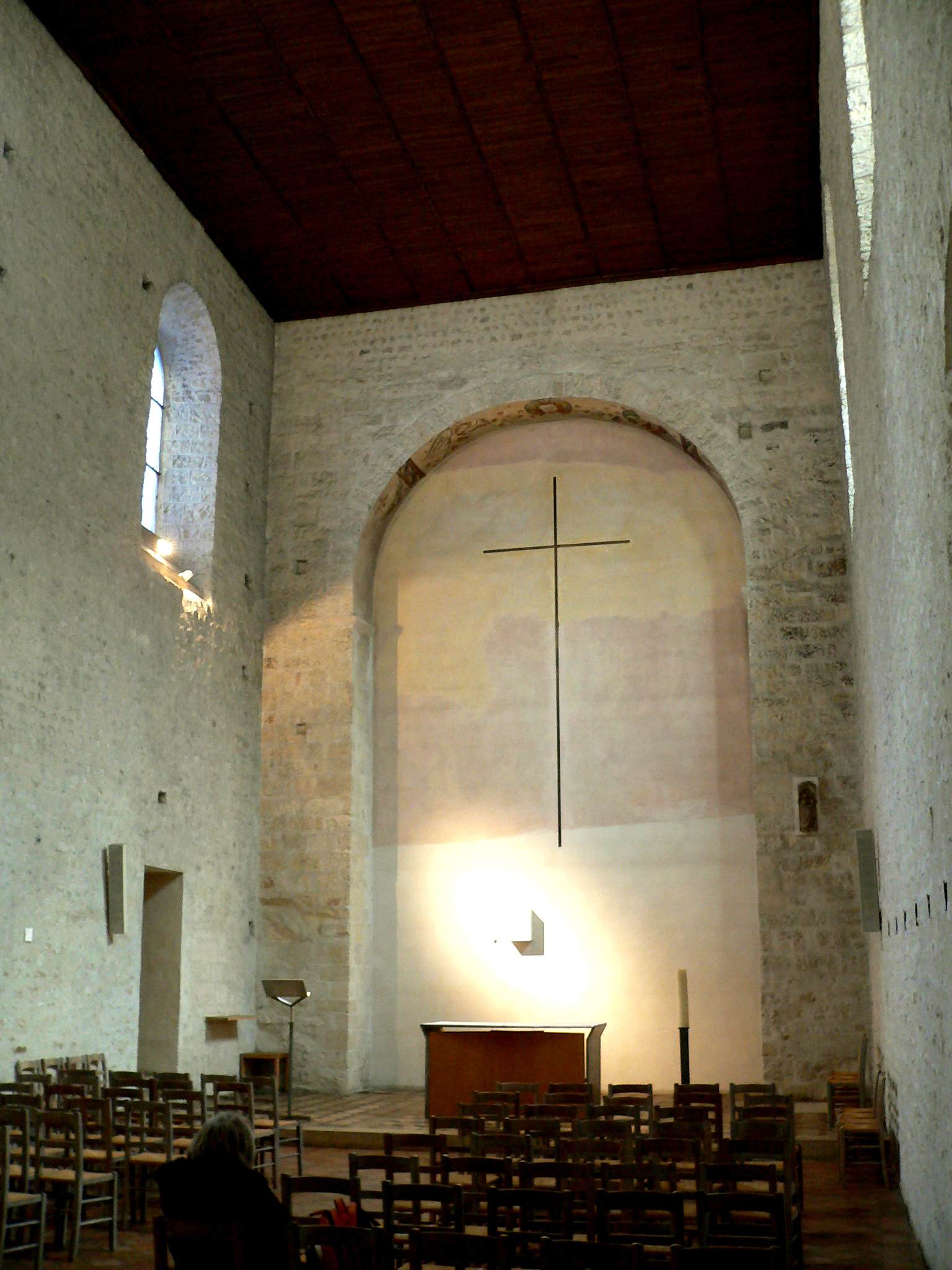
The Chapel of Saint Symphorien, the oldest surviving portion of the Abbey of Saint-Germain-des-Prés (Begun 990)

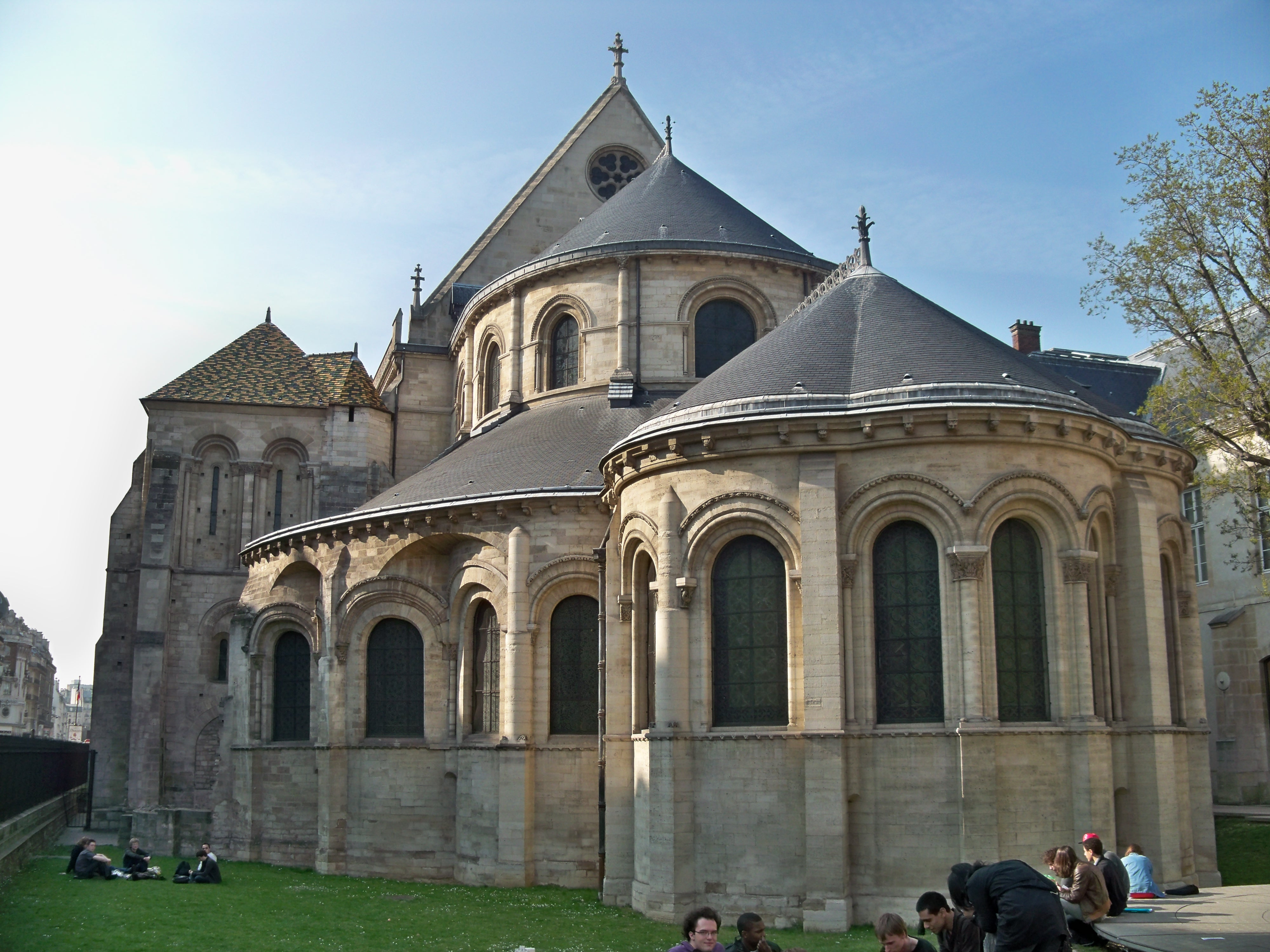
Apse of Saint-Martin-des-Champs Priory (1060–1147)

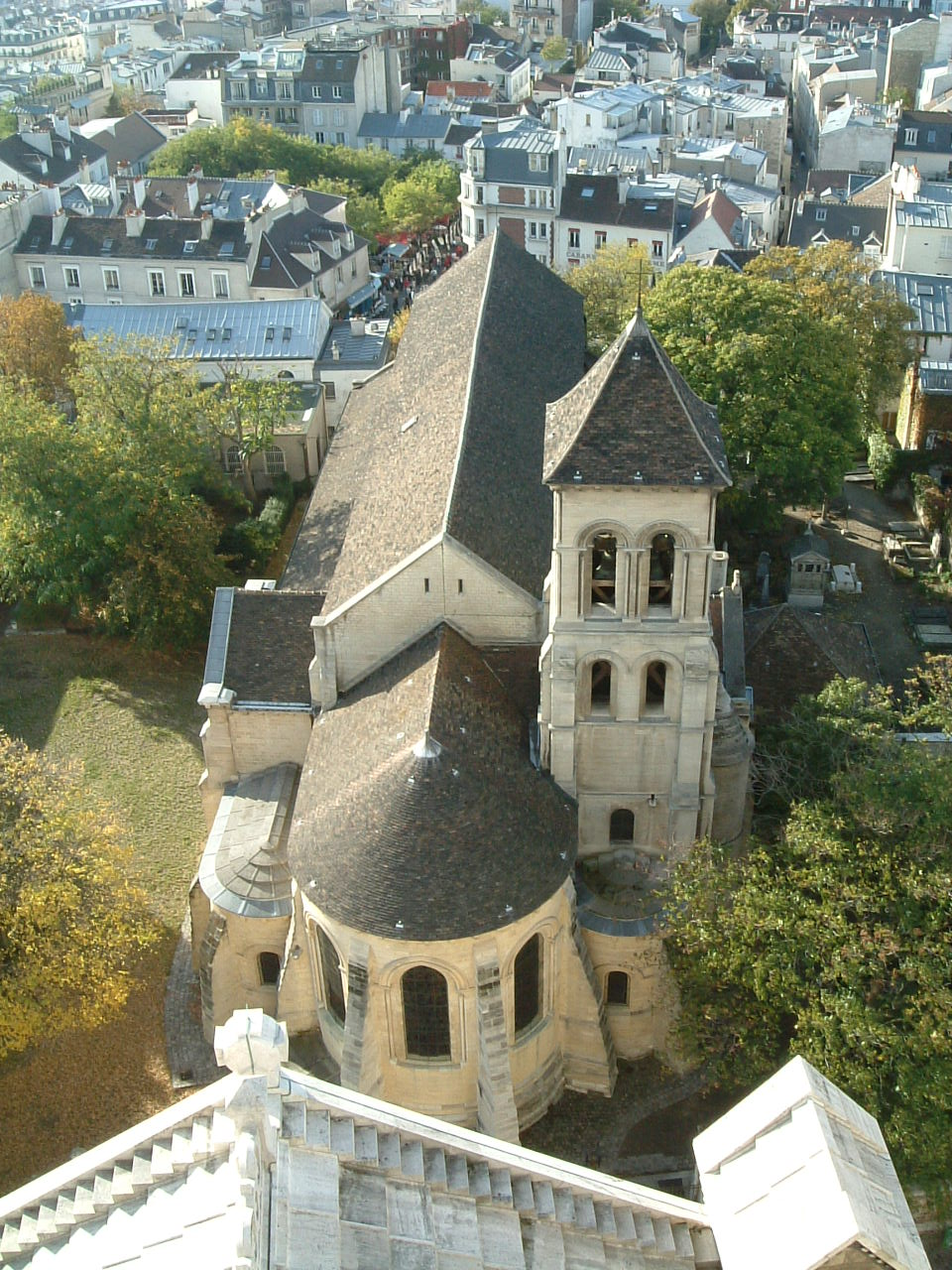
Saint-Pierre de Montmartre seen the Basilica of Sacré-Cœur (1147–1200)

=== Normandy and Brittany ===
The Romanesque style varied from region to region, largely in response to the materials available. In Brittany, the local granite stone was very dense and too heavy for most roof structures; architects often preferred to cover the vaults with wood instead of stone. An example is the ceiling of the Abbatiale of the Abbey of Mont-San Michel.

The use of wooden vaulted ceilings instead of stone allowed the construction of taller and longer churches; the nave of Saint-Melanie of Rennes is more than eighty meters long and ten meters high particularly at the crossing of the transept, the oldest part of the church. Romanesque churches in Normandy often featured narrow tribunes and wide bays, which gave greater space to the interior.

The most notable Norman romanesque monuments are the two former abbey churches in Caen, both of which were remarkable for the height of their ceilings and their towers. They were both founded by William the Conqueror and constructed at the same time. The church of the Abbey of Saint-Étienne, Caen, also known as the Abbey aux Hommes, was built by William the Conqueror as the main church of the Abbey of Saint Stephen. The nave was constructed in about 1060–1065, and the twin towers in about 1120. The Abbey of Sainte-Trinité, Caen, known as the Abbey aux Femmes, was built at the same time for the Abbey of the Holy Trinity, but in a slightly different style.

The construction of the two abbey churches saw the introduction of an important architectural innovation; a ceiling with an early form of rib vaults, used in both The Abbaye des Dames and the Abbaye des Hommes. The roof of the choir of the Abbaye des Dames was very high, eight meters, and in about 1100 to 1110 it began to show signs of weakness and was demolished. It was replaced in about 1120 by a rib vault, among the earliest in France, which allowed a lighter and stronger roof, and which permitted larger windows at the high level. Along with the very early experimental rib vaults at Vézelay Abbey and in Burgundy, this was one of the first rib vaults in France, and a notable predecessor of Gothic architecture.

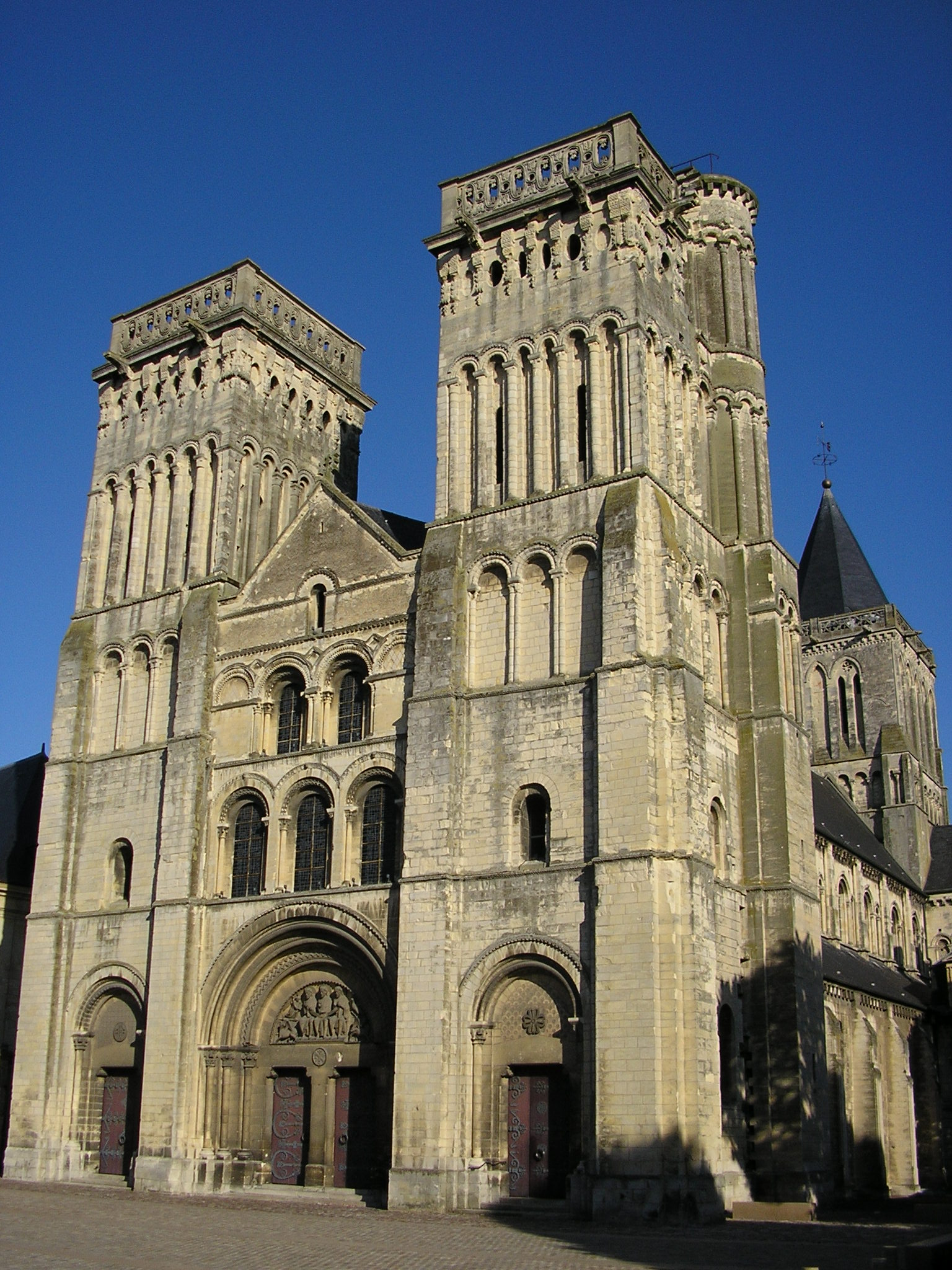
Abbey of Sainte-Trinité, Caen (1060–1065), now part of the regional government complex

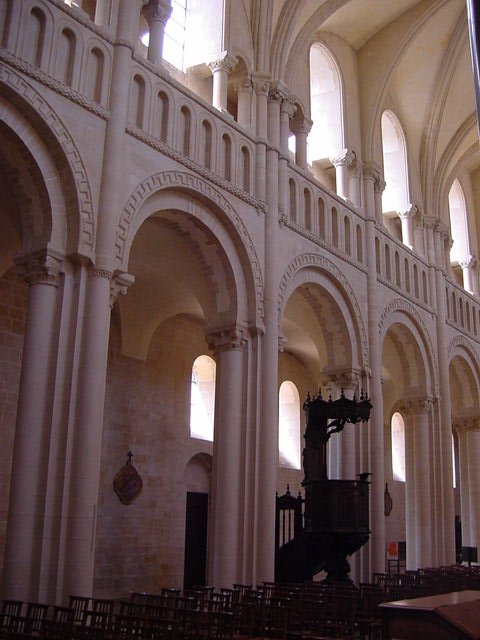
Nave of the Abbey of Sainte-Trinité, Caen, with grand arcades, triforium, and windows above

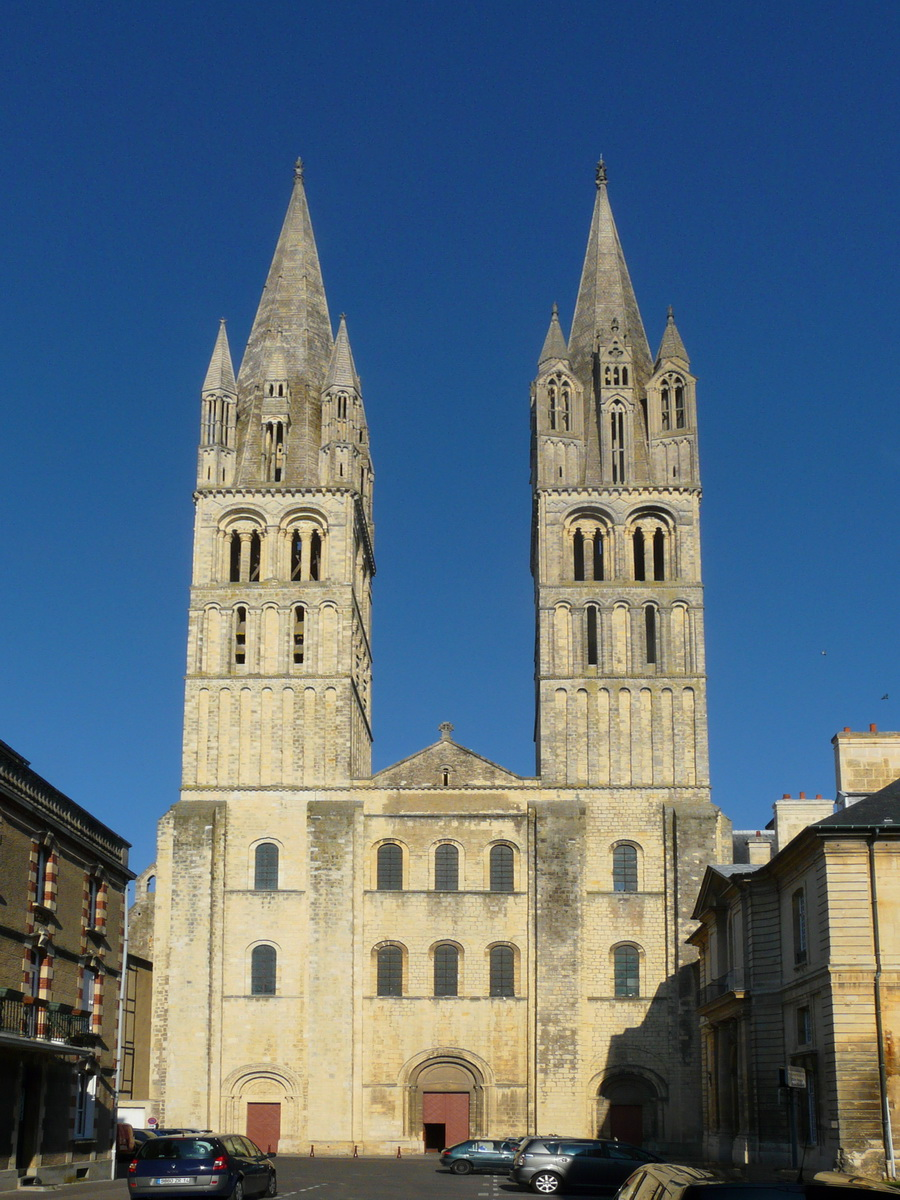
Towers and west facade of the Abbey of Saint-Étienne, Caen (1060–1065)

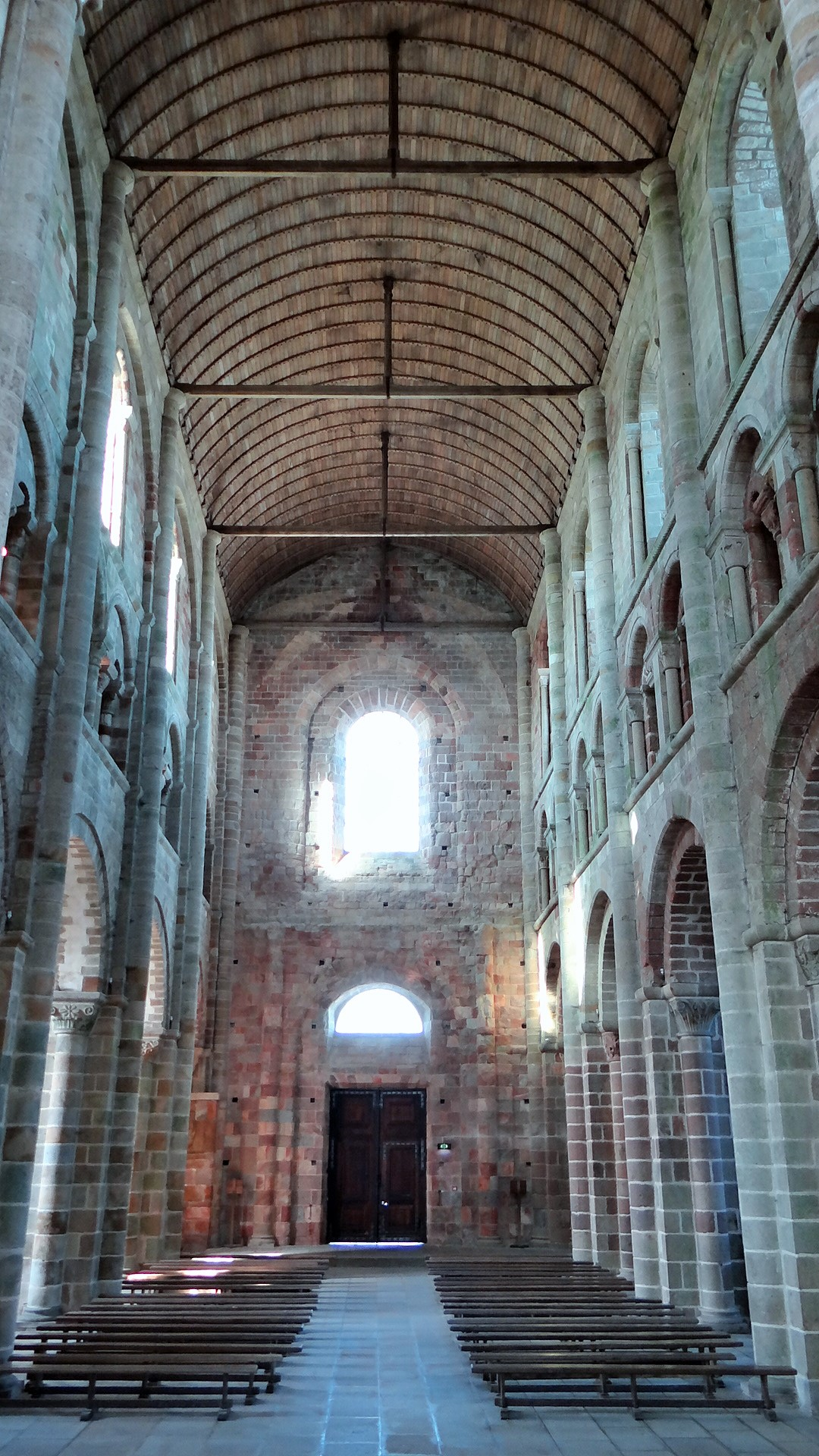
Wooden vaulted ceiling of the Abbatiale of Mont-Saint-Michel.

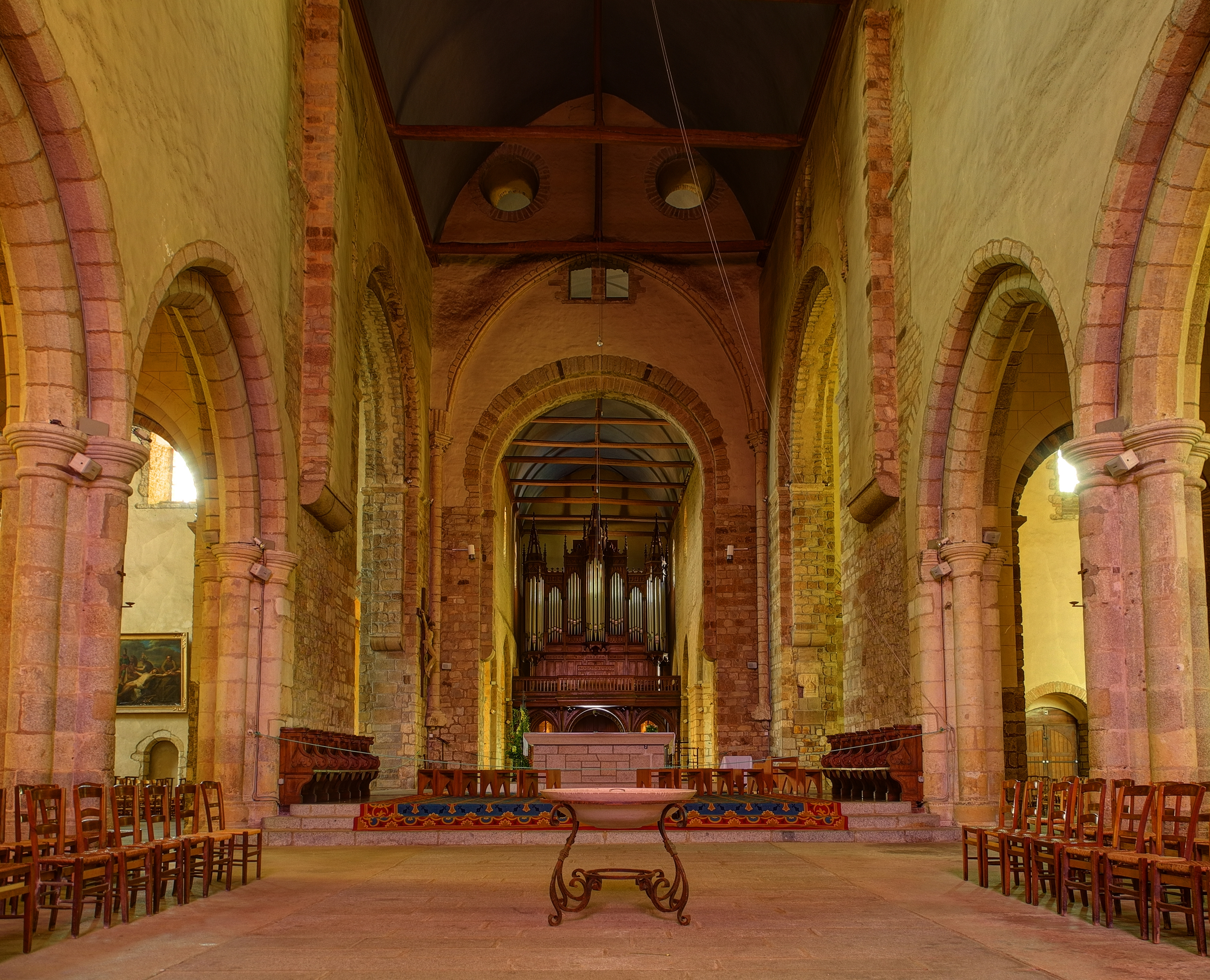
Crossing of the transept in Notre-Dame-en-Saint-Melanie in Rennes, a Romanesque vestige

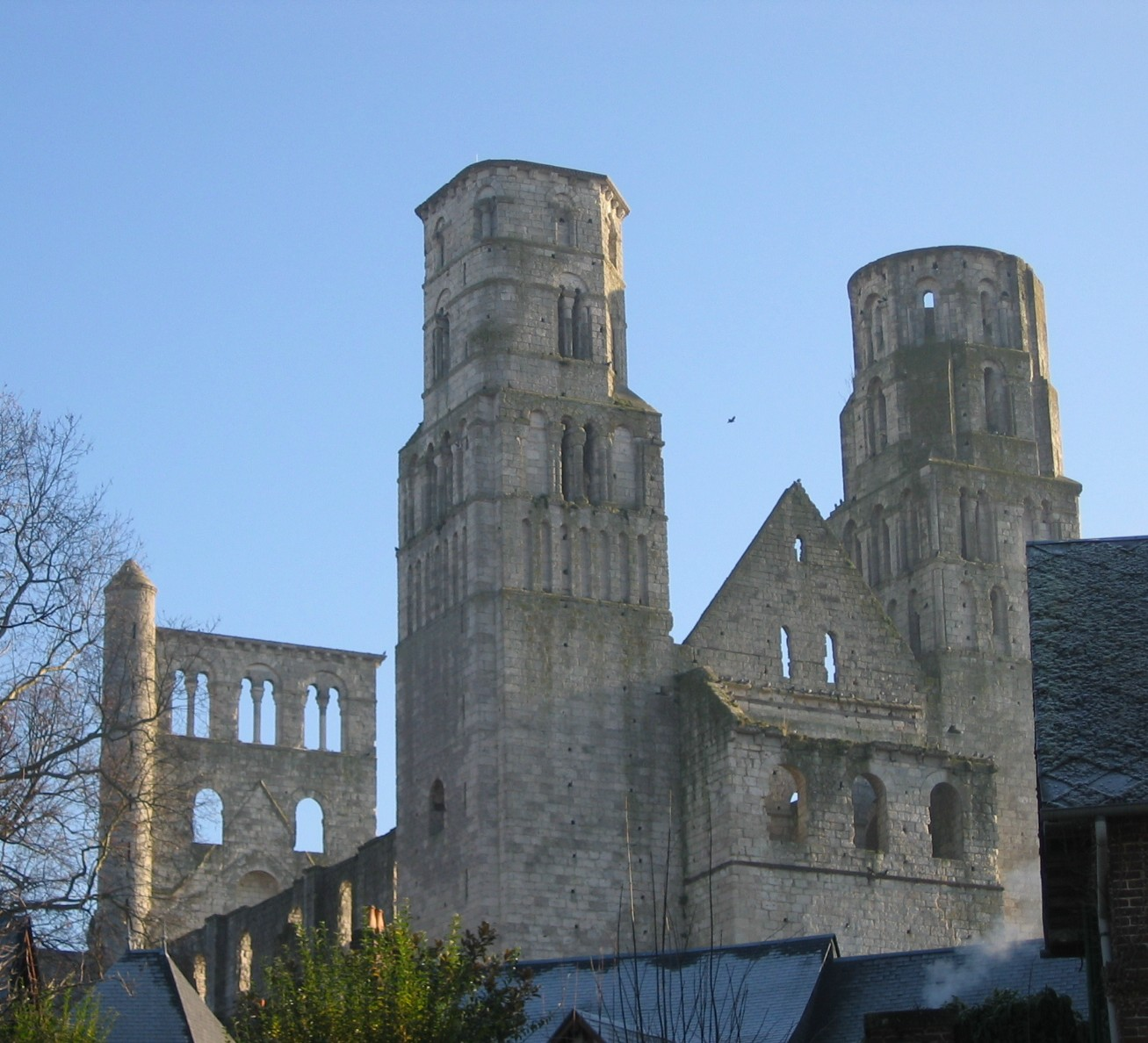
Ruins of Jumièges Abbey (1040–1067), built by the Dukes of Normandy

== Decoration ==
=== Sculpture ===
The development of sculpture in Romanesque France was closely connected with architecture. The earliest sculptural decorations on altars and the interior surfaces of churches, on lintels, over doorways and particularly on the capitals of columns, which were commonly adorned with images of biblical figures and real or mythical animals. Most of the work was almost flat with little attempt at realism. Some of the earliest Romanesque sculpture in France is found at Saint-Génis-des-Fontaines Abbey (1019–1020) in the eastern Pyrenees. A lintel over a doorway portrays Christ on a throne, in a frame supported by two angels, and flanked by the apostles. The forms of the apostles are defined by the shapes of the arches into which they are squeezed.

In the later Romanesque period, sculpture was often used to at the most important points, such as the facades, to emphasize the lines of the structure. It often used geometric designs (circles, squares, triangles). Spaces were crowded with figures, which were often contorted so they seemed to be dancing. The sculpture was most profuse on the capitals of columns and on the portals, where it was used to present very complex and extended biblical stories. Sculptors also depicted a large number of animals, both real and imaginary, including chimeras, sirens, lions, and a wide range of monsters. Imagination usually prevailed over realism.

Some of the most remarkable sculpture is found on the tympanum and the capitals of the columns of the cloister of Moissac Abbey in Mossac, Tarne-et-Garonne, and the columns of the abbey church of Saint-Marie in Souillac in the Lot Department; and Saint-Philibert de Tournus Abbey in Burgundy.

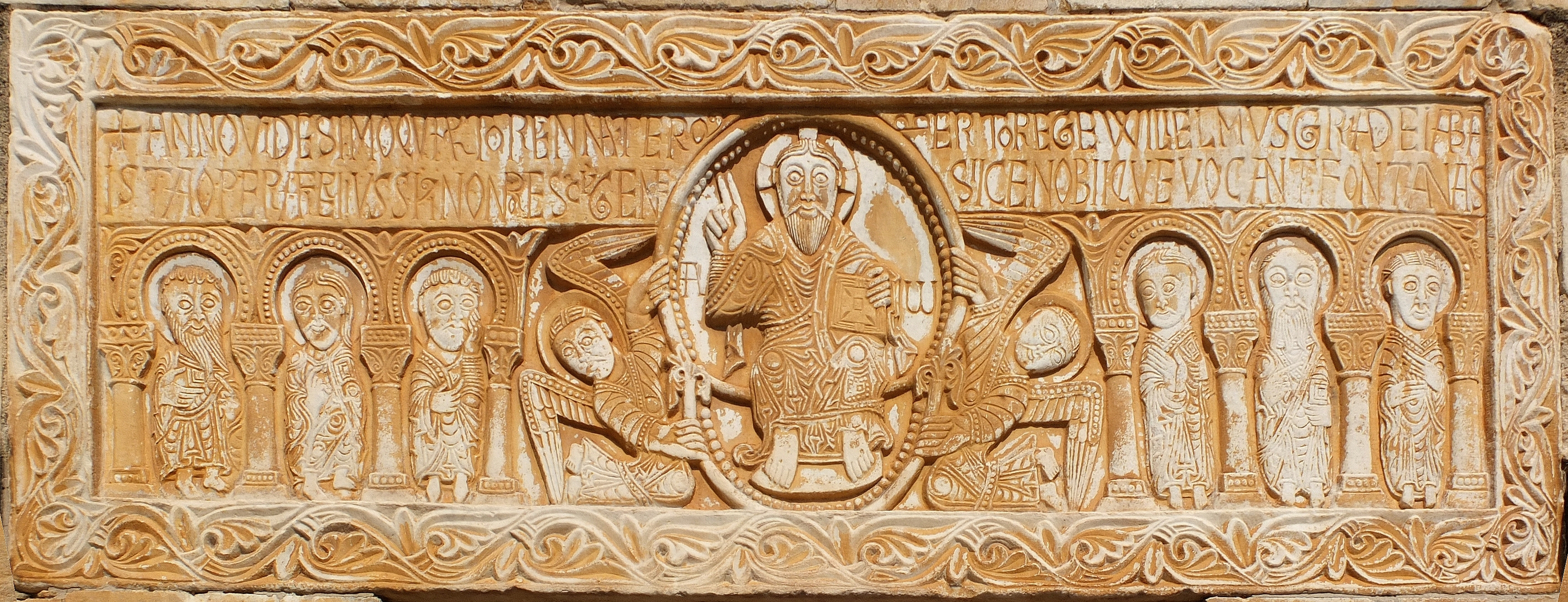
Early Romanesque lintel over a doorway at Saint-Génis-des-Fontaines Abbey (1019–1020)

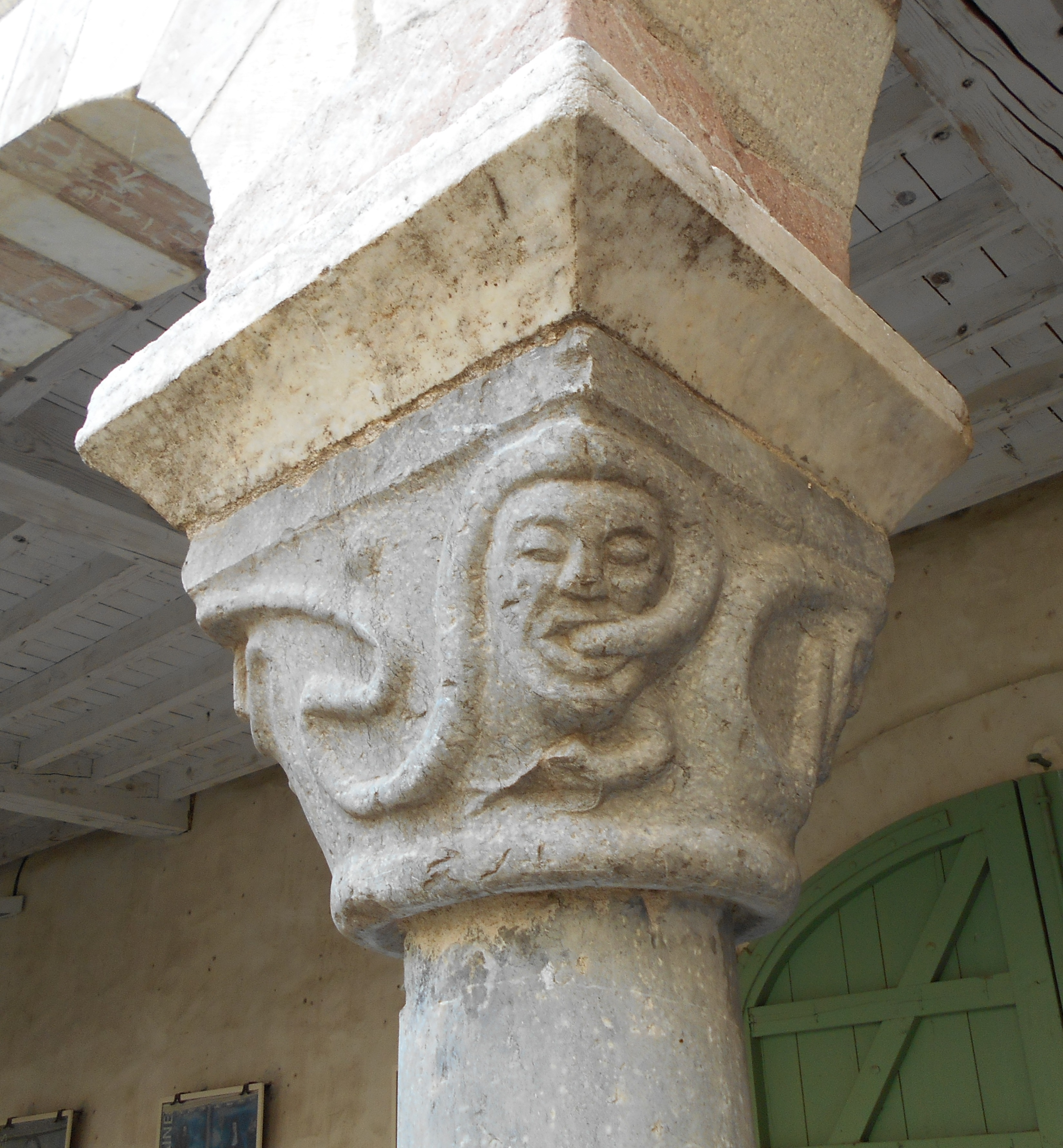
Column capital at Saint-Génis-des-Fontaines Abbey in the Pyrenees (1019–1020)

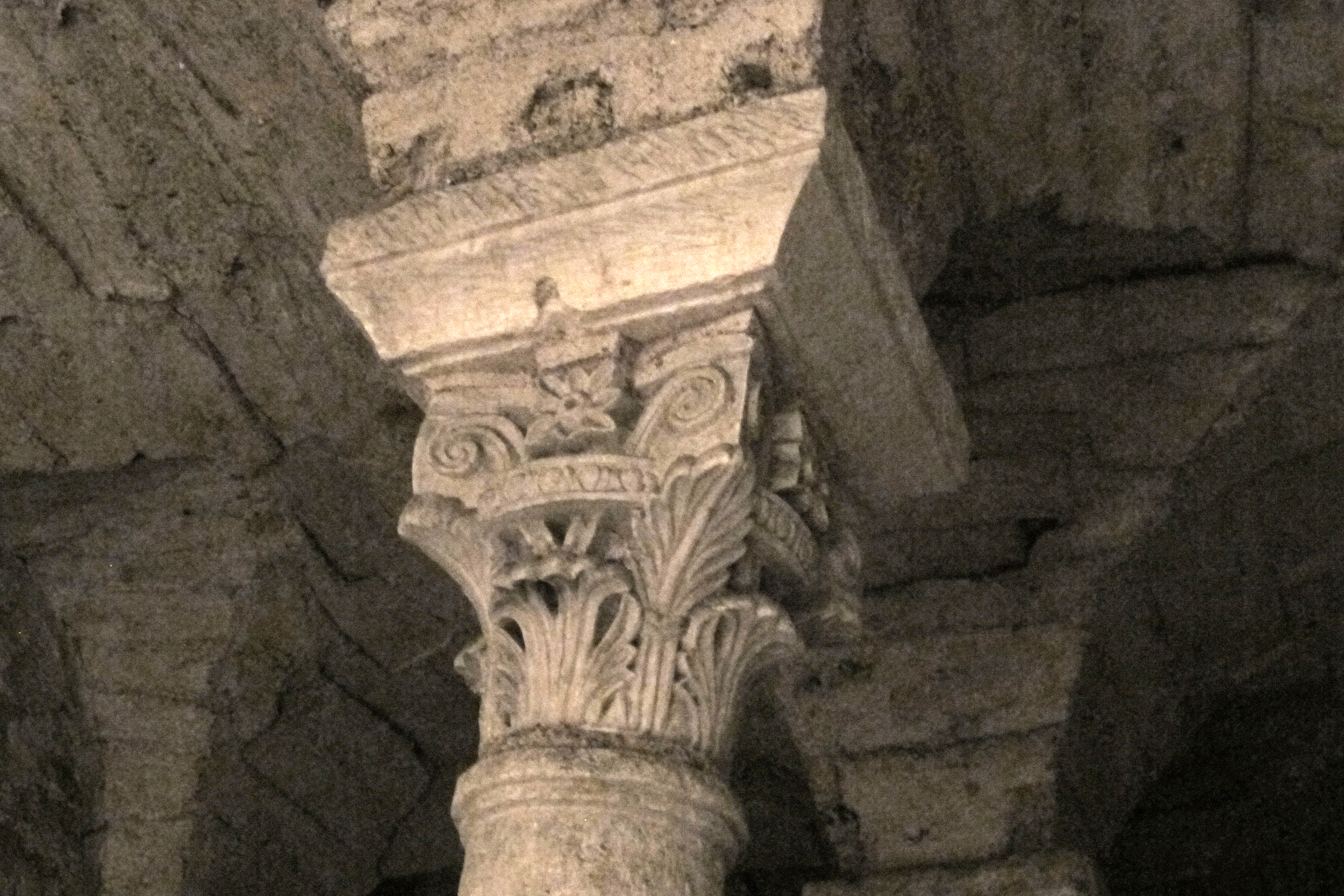
Capital of column in Saint-Philibert de Tournus Abbey in Burgundy (about 1100)

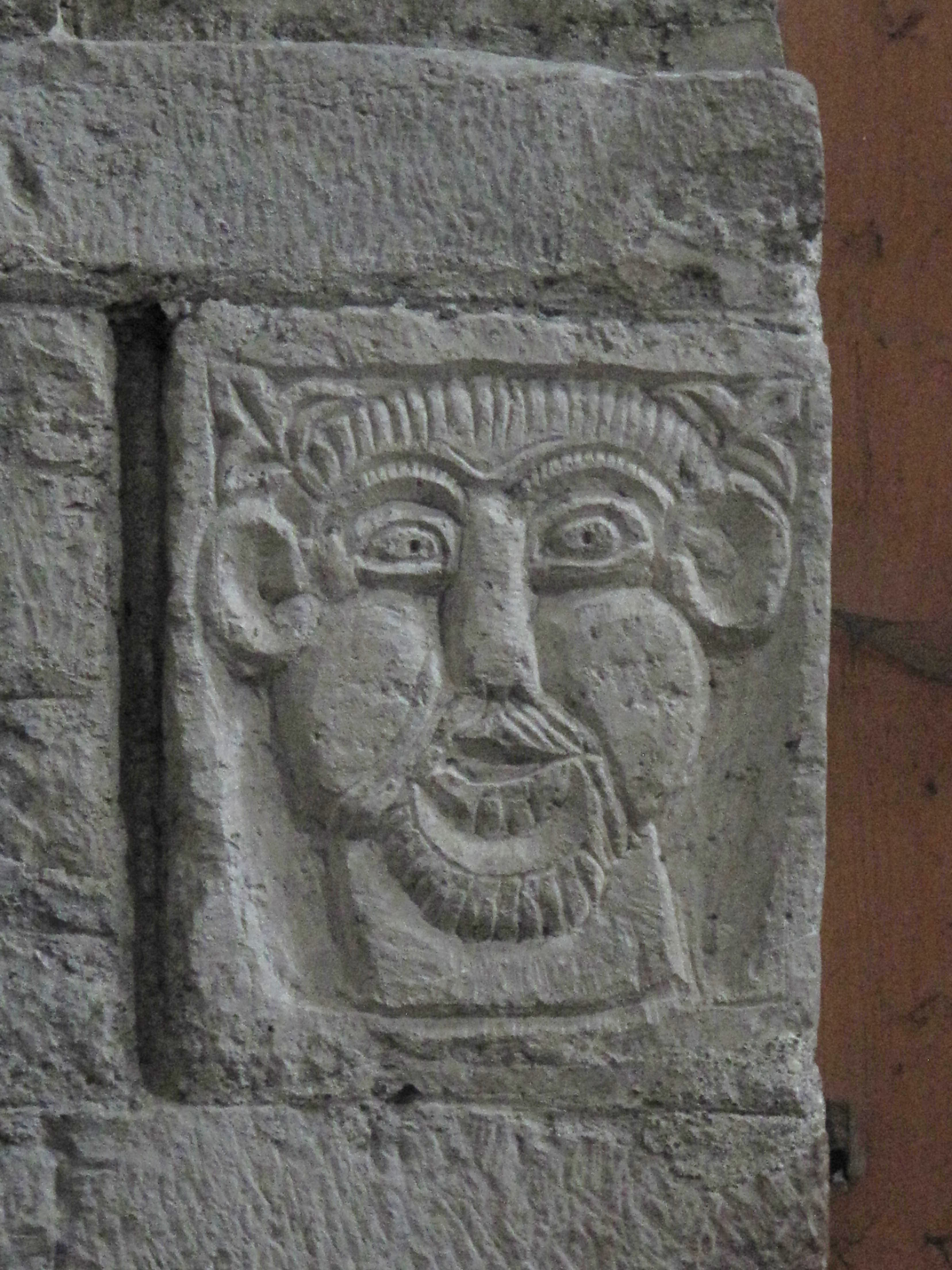
Sculpted face from Saint-Philibert de Tournus Abbey in Burgundy.

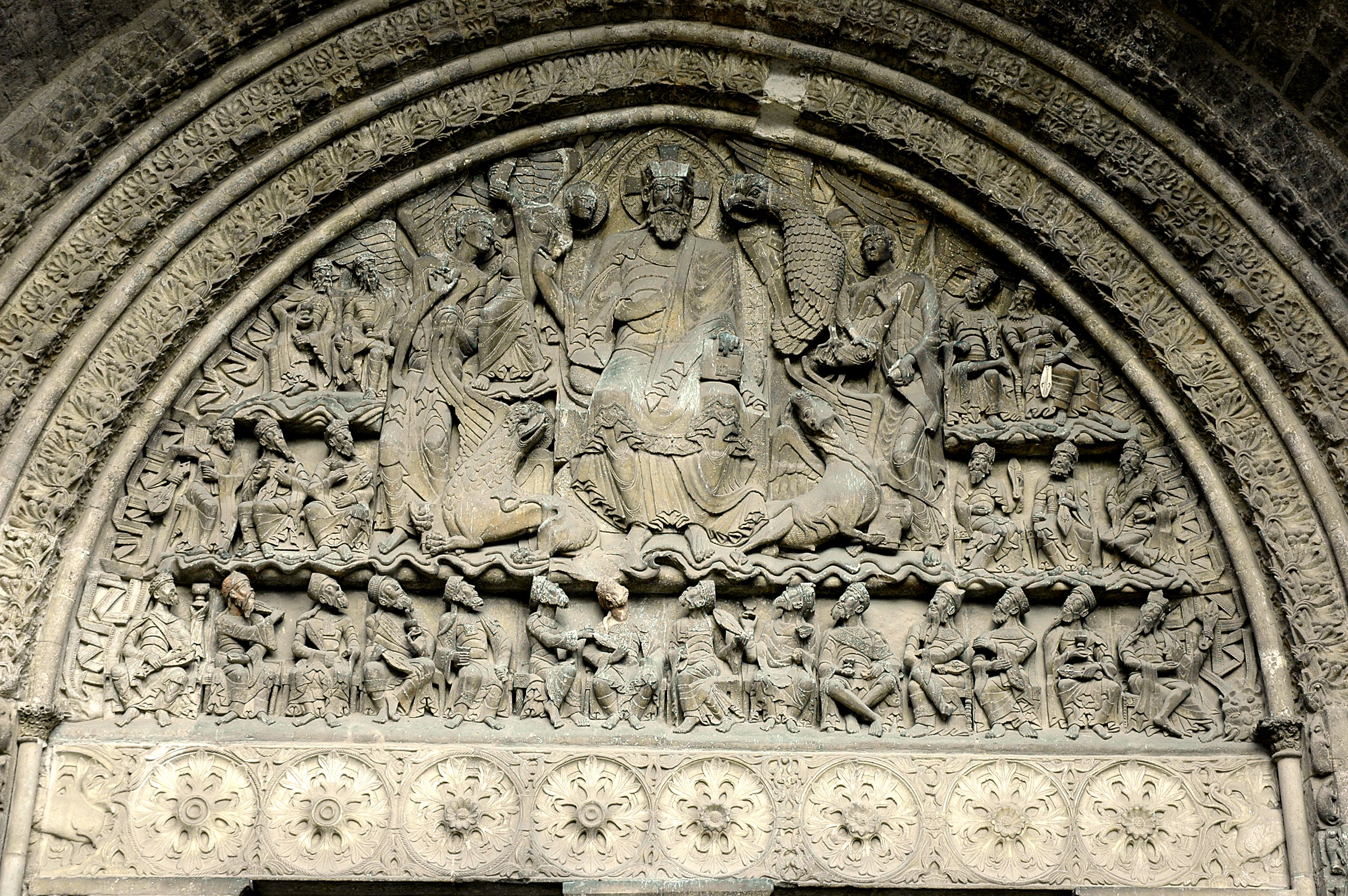
Southwest portal of Moissac Abbey (1115–1131) in the Tarn-et-Garonne in the Occitanie Region of Southern France

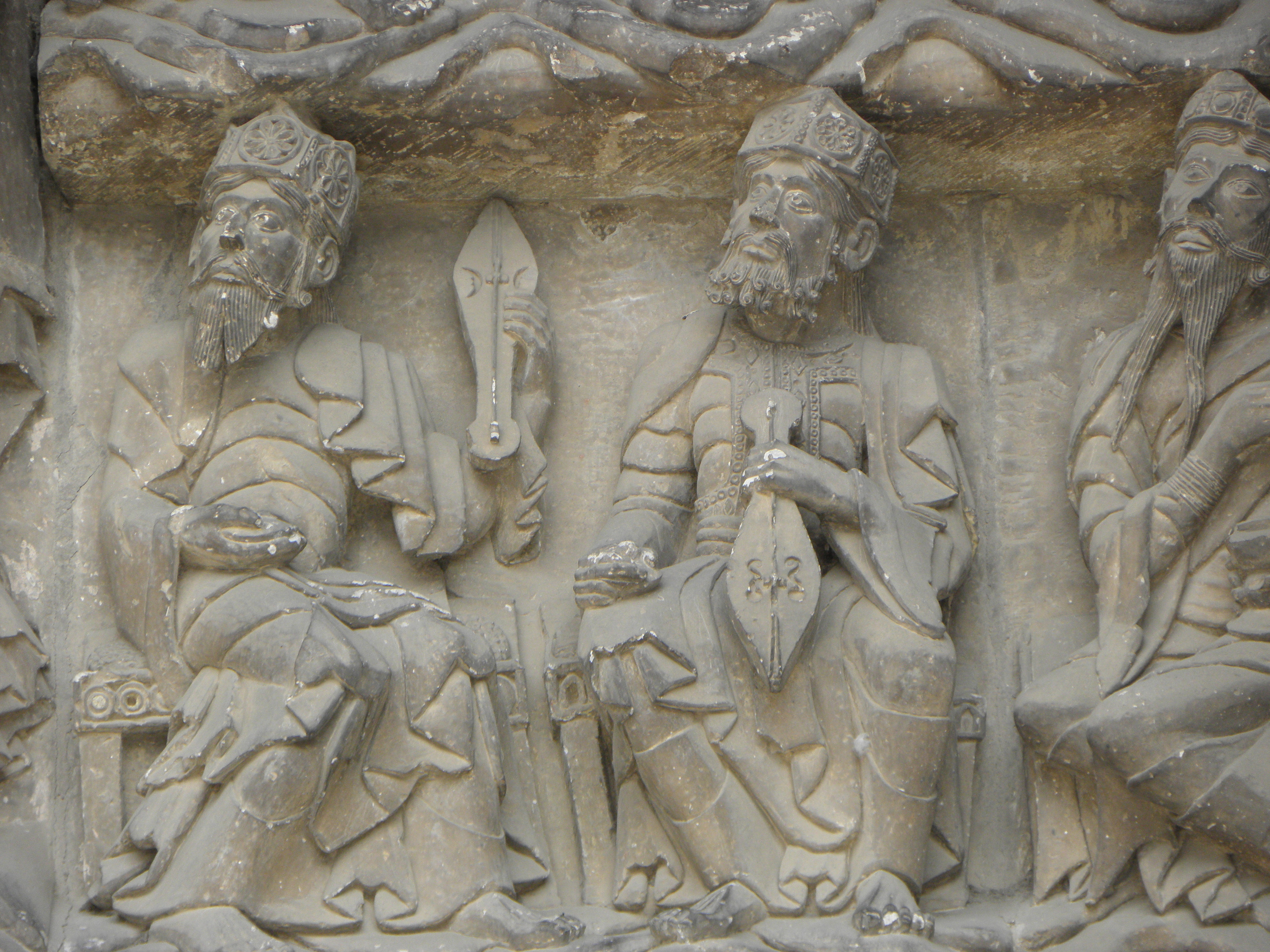
Detail of the Wise Men in the Moissac Abbey portal

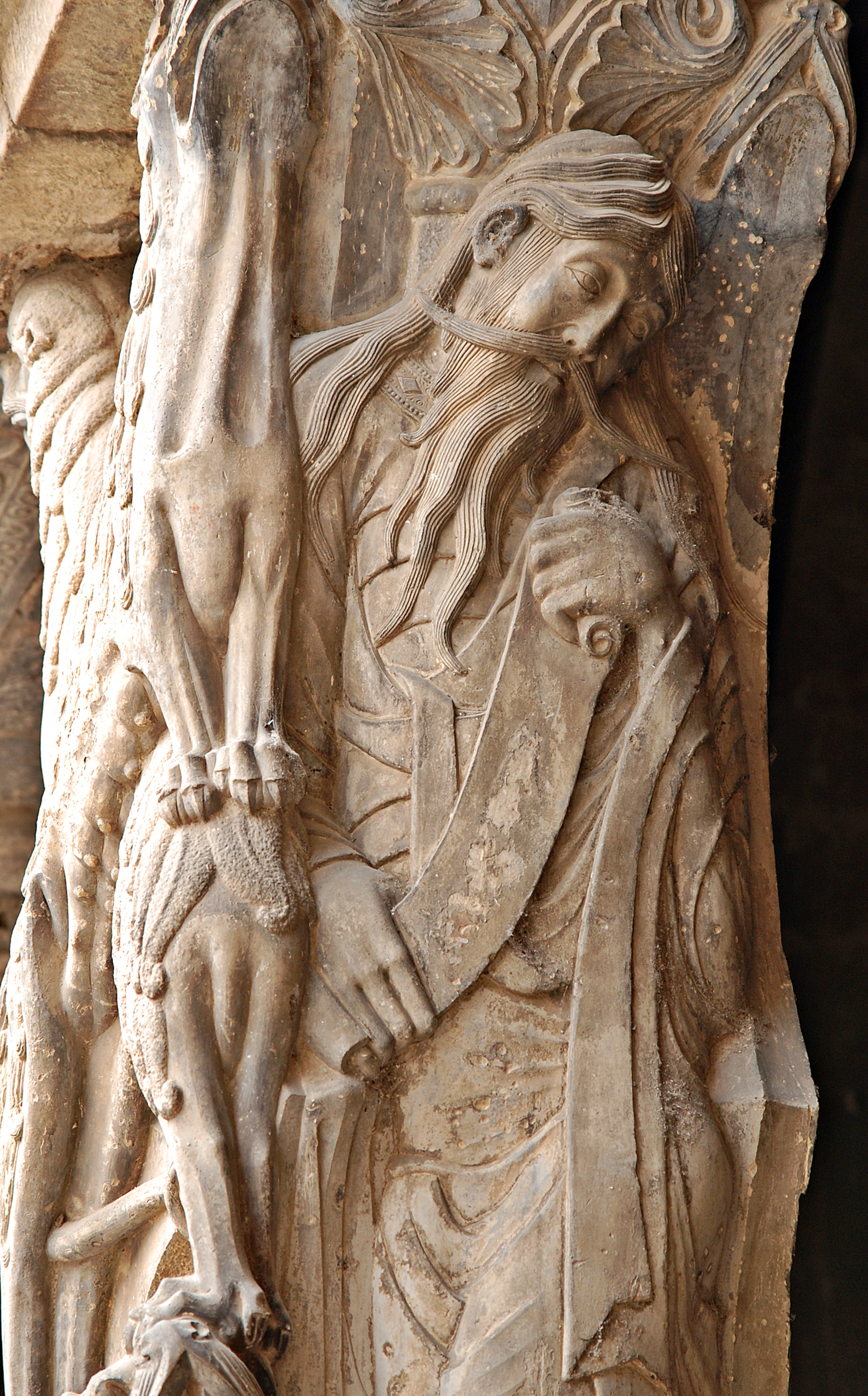
Figure of the prophet Jeremiah on the south portal of Moissac Abbey

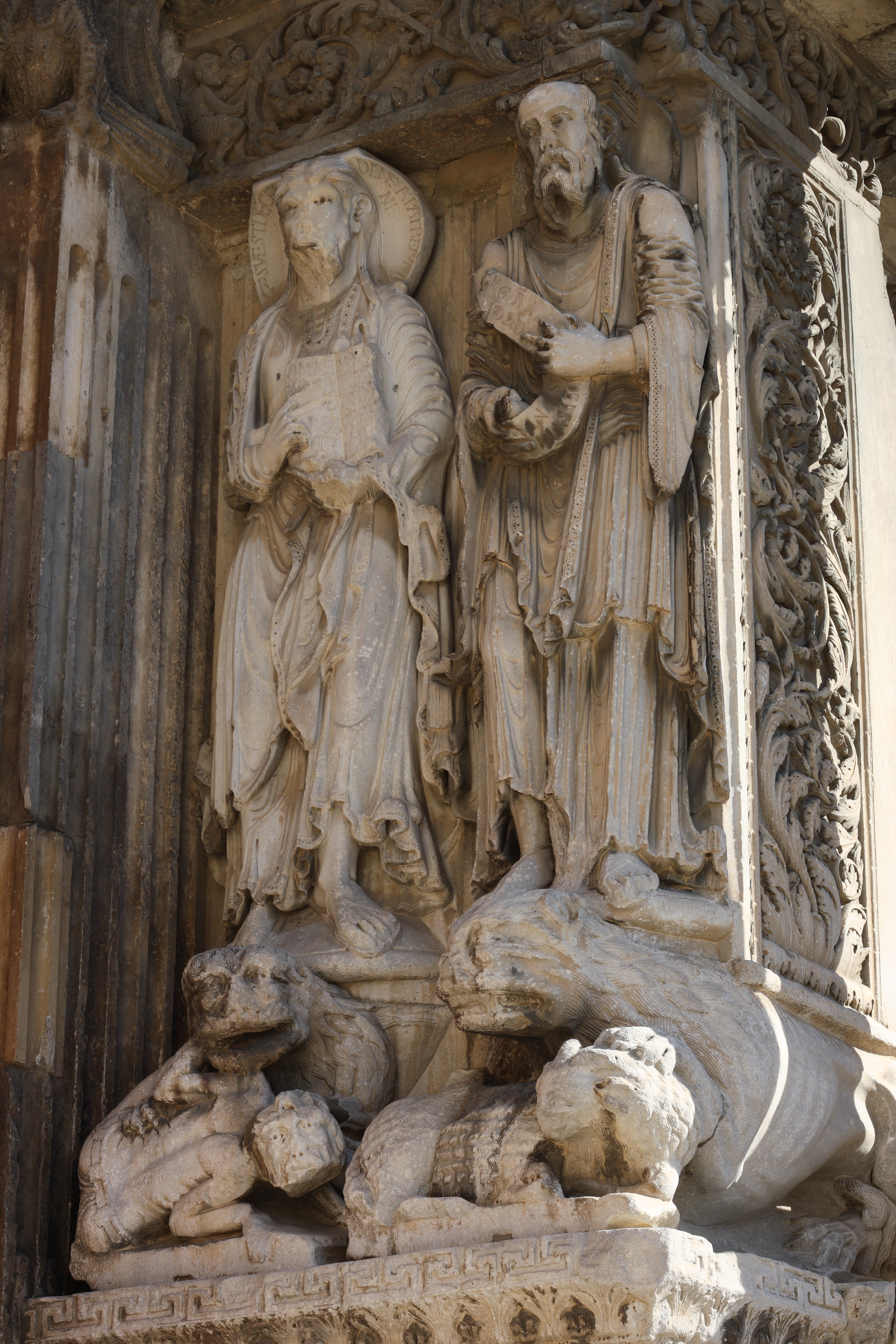
Statues of Saint Paul and Saint Jacob on the portal of Abbey of Saint-Gilles

Another remarkable group of Romanesque sculpture is found in the decoration of the Basilica of Saint-Sernin, Toulouse in Toulouse, dating to the late 11th and early 12th century. The figures are much more realistic, and make skillful use of shadows and light to bring out the details. One of the most remarkable works is the altar table, signed by its sculptor, Bernardus Gelduinus. He also made the seven sculptural reliefs found in the ambulatory of the cathedral.

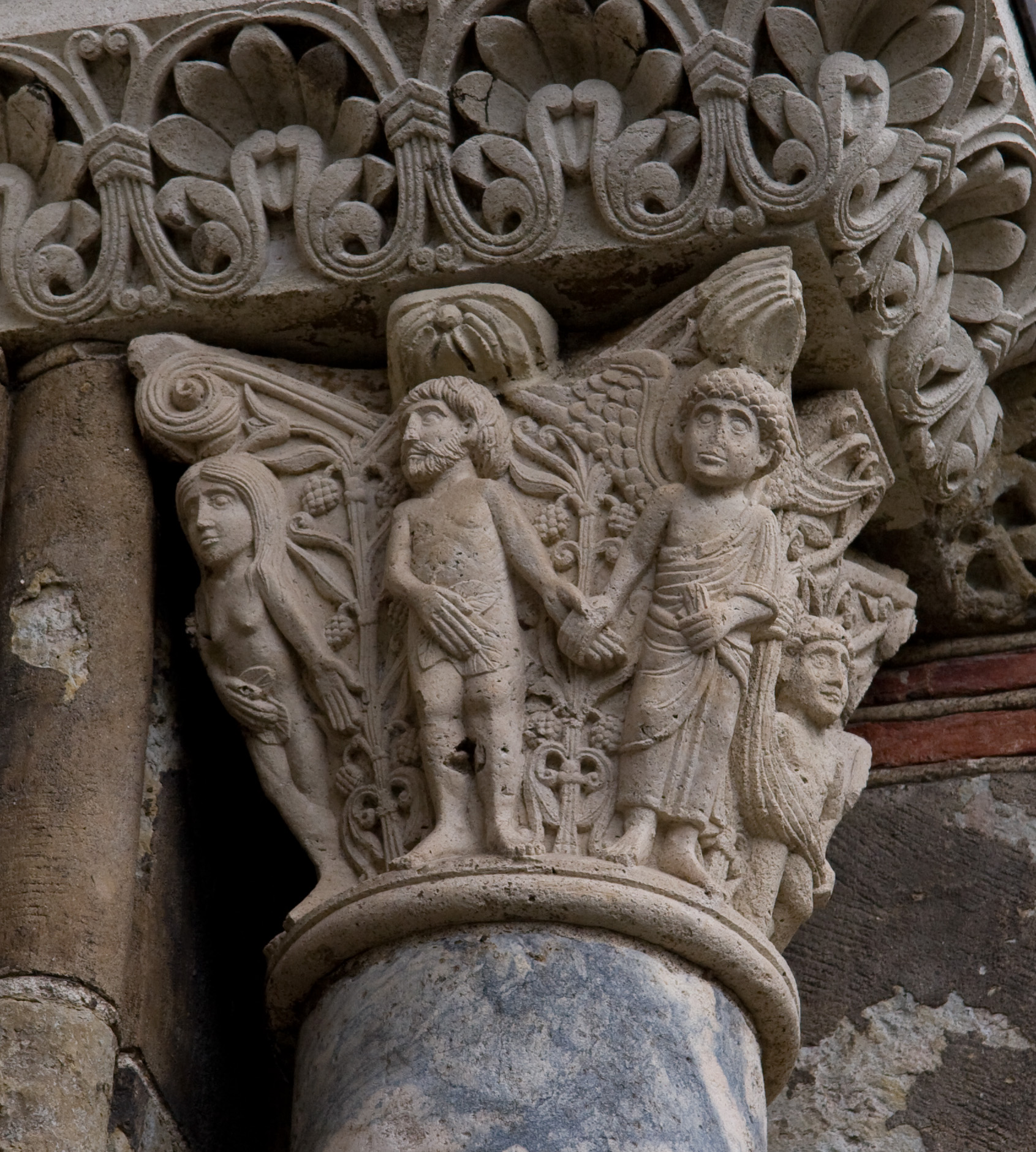
Capital of a column depicting Adam and Eve being chased from Paradise, in the Basilica of Saint-Sernin, Toulouse

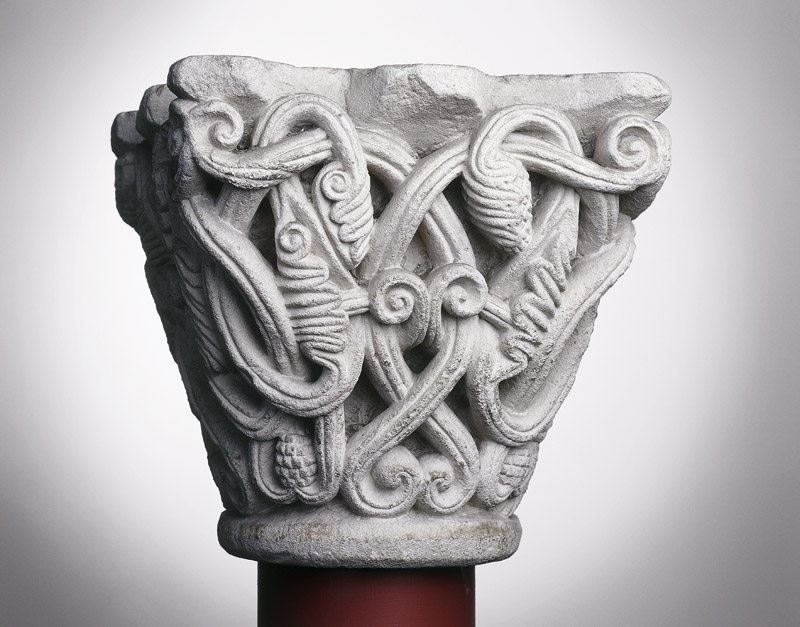
Capital of a column in the Basilica of Saint-Sernin, Toulouse, depicting foliage

In the middle and late 12th century, the sculptural decoration became much more realistic, detailed, and finely sculpted. Notable examples are the facade of the west portal of the Church of St. Trophime, Arles, from the end of the 12th century, decorated with stately figures of the apostles, and the capitals of the double columns in the cloister, each one different, illustrating parsonages from the Bible. Third of the 12th century, the sculpture at Arles demonstrates the extent to which Romanesque had become an international style. The left side of the west portal of the Church of St. Trophime, Arles (late 12th century), depicts the Apocalypse according to Saint John. The use of sculpted lions' heads to support the pilasters is borrowed from Italy, and a number of the figures on the capitals in the cloister, illustrating the Three Kings and the flight from Egypt, were made by Benedetto Antelami, one of the master Romanesque sculptors of Italy.

Vézelay Abbey is also famous for its rich and complex tympanum, sheltered within the large porch of the church. Its theme is the Pentecost, with biblical stories, and how the message of Christ was being spread to the different peoples of the world, as well as images of the mythical creatures who were believed to live at the edges of the world. It was made in tn th 12th century, when Vézelay was considered an important intellectual center. under one of its abbots, Peter the Venerable. Another famous tympani is that of the Abbey Church of Saint Foy, in Conques, in which some one hundred characters are depicted in vivid scenes from the Last Judgement.

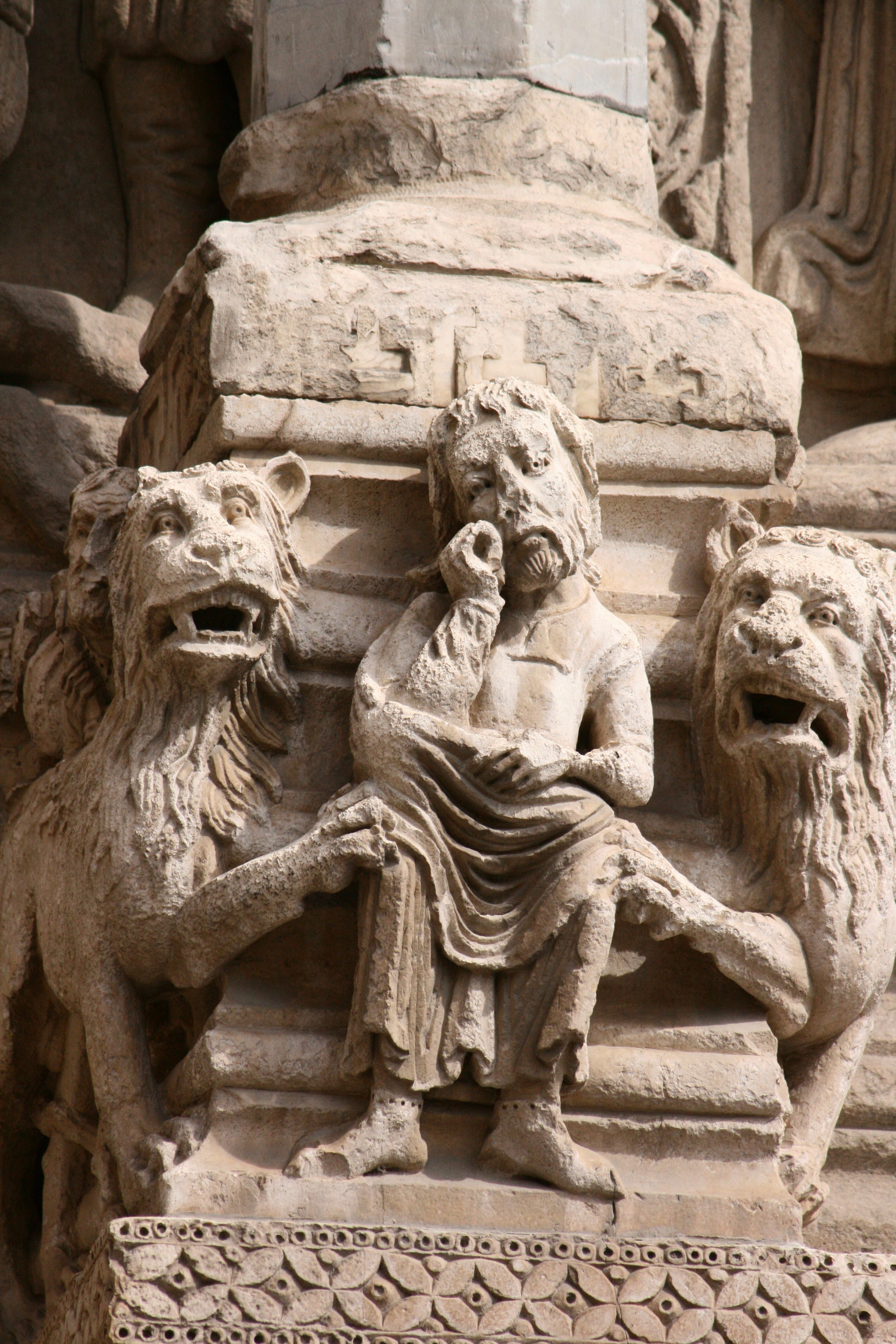
Daniel in the Lion's Den, from porch of the Church of St. Trophime, Arles (late 12th century)

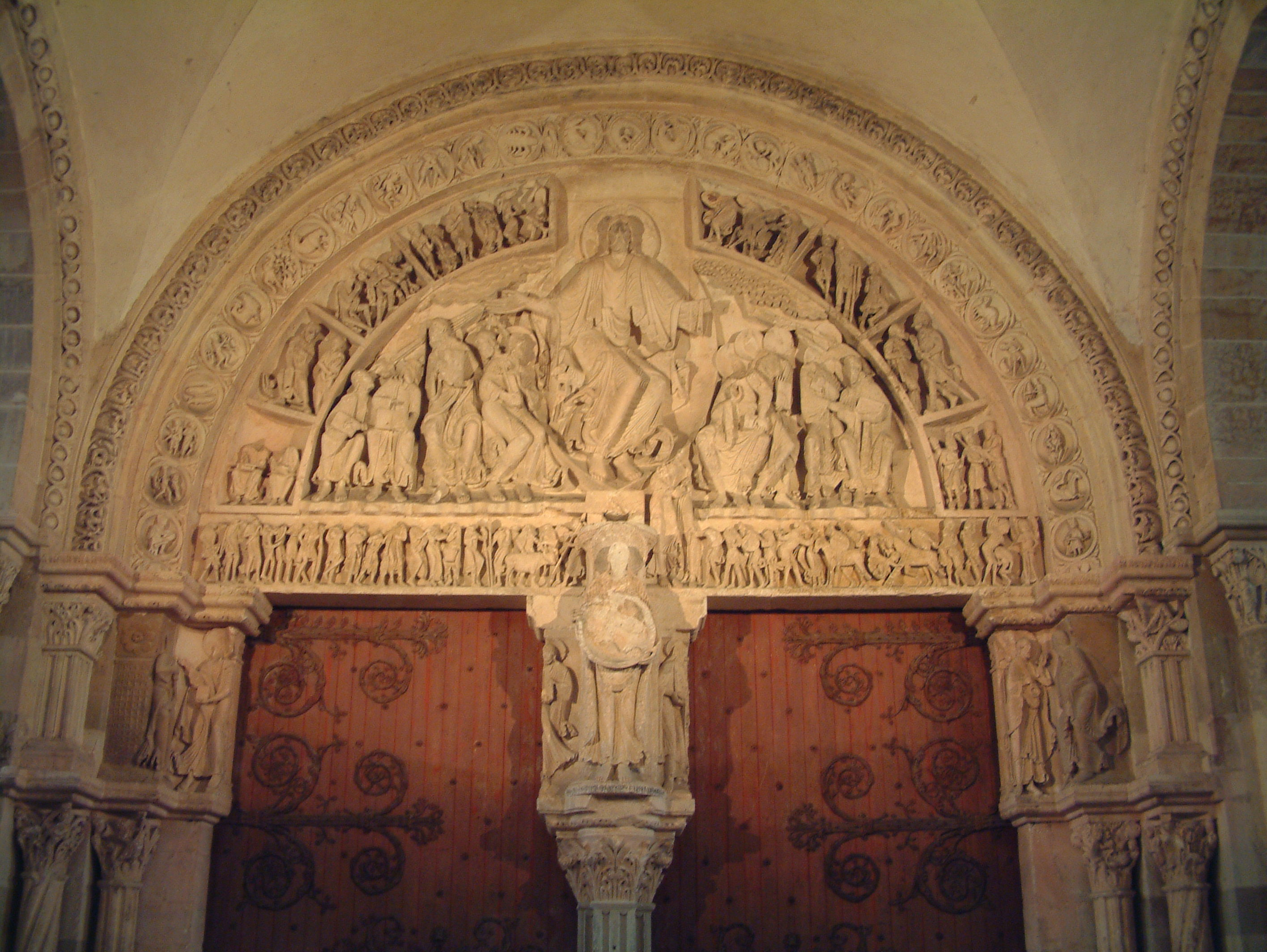
The central typanum at Vézelay Abbey

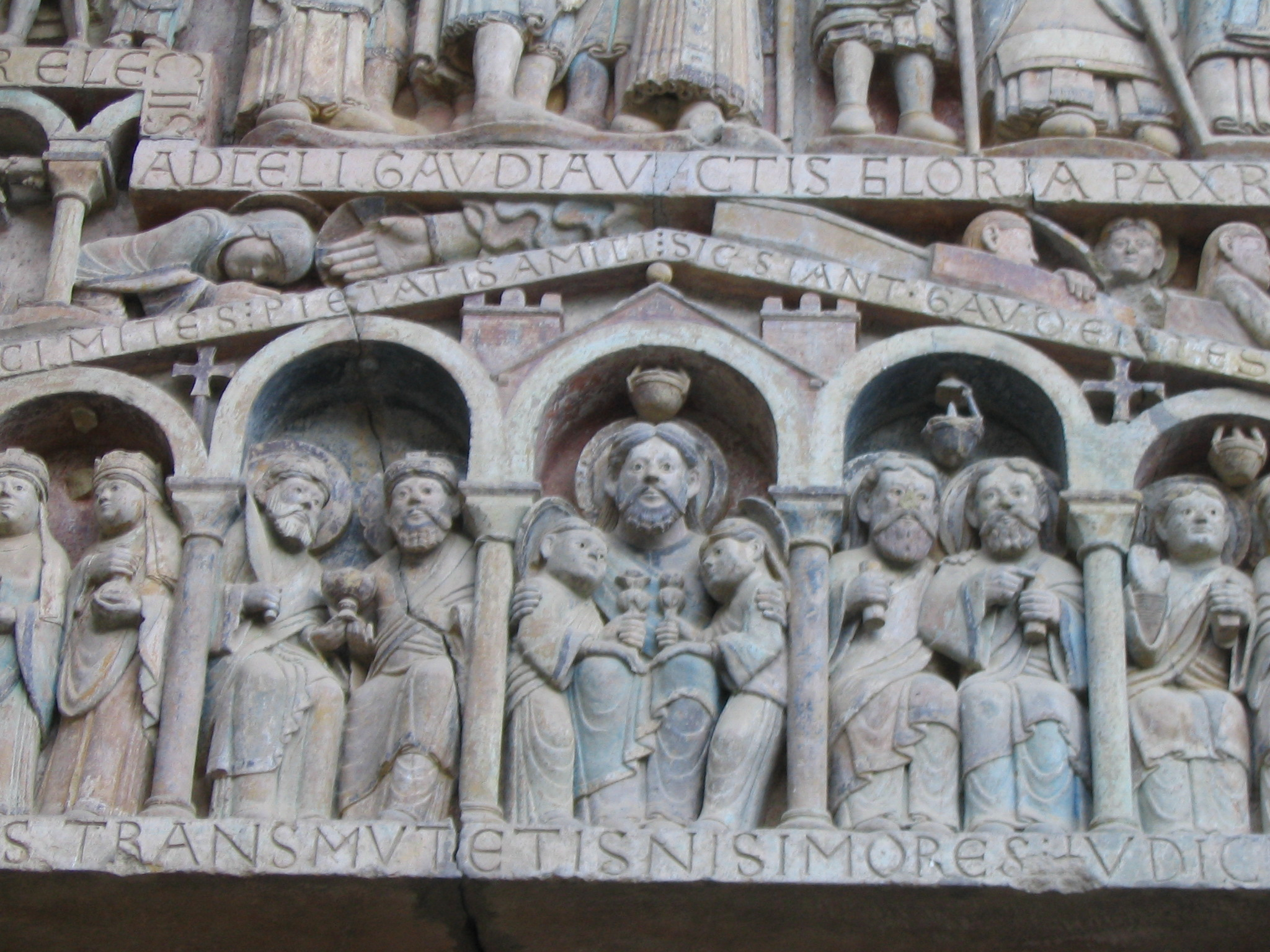
Detail of the Last Judgement in the Tynpanum of the Abbey Church of Saint Foy

=== Murals ===
The interiors of French Romanesque churches were filled with color, including paintings on the walls and ceiling, mosaics on the floor, and, late in the period, early stained glass windows. The exceptions were the abbeys of the Cistercians, which contained no decoration at all. Most of the murals were destroyed in the 18th and 19th century, when it was felt that a bare stone wall was more appropriate for a church interior. Two different techniques were usually used; either a fresco, painted while the plaster was still wet with paint diluted with water; or détrempe, painted the pigments mixed with a binder, such as an oil or eggwhite, and painted on dry plaster. Often both techniques were used, with the large designs painted as a fresco, and the details détremps. The work required rapid execution. The subjects were chosen by the Church hierarchy, not by the artists, and the names of the artists, in most cases, remained unknown.

The walls of Romanesque churches were rarely left bare. Many Romanesque church interiors were painted with cycles of illustrations of Biblical stores. Sometimes the topics were of local interest; the paintings at Saint-Martin-de-Vic illustrate how the monks of Tours stole relics from the Monastery of Poitiers. The paintings were not limited to the interiors, and often also covered the tympanums capitals, and other exterior decoration. The sculpture in the interior was also commonly painted. Wooden church ceilings, common before the wide use of rib arches, were also usually painted. An early example of a painted church is Berzé-la-Ville, where the paintings on the ceiling of the Chapel of the Monks depict the moment that Christ gave the apostles Peter and Paul the messages to spread to the world.

One of the most important existing examples of a painted French Romanesque church is Abbey Church of Saint-Savin-sur-Gartempe in Poitou. It was founded in the 9th century over the tombs of the Christian martyrs Sabinus of Spoleto and Saint Cyprian, and in the Middle Ages became a major pilgrimage church. Beginning in about 1100, the church was enlarged and entirely painted inside, from the crypt to the ceiling. The faux-marble of the columns in the nave were also painted. The architecture of the church, including the placement of the arches and vaults, was designed to make the paintings, the main attraction, more easily visible.

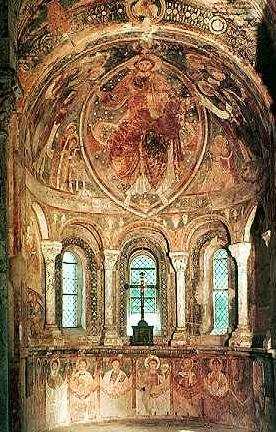
Painted apse in the Chapel of the Monks at Berzé-la-Ville (about 1100)

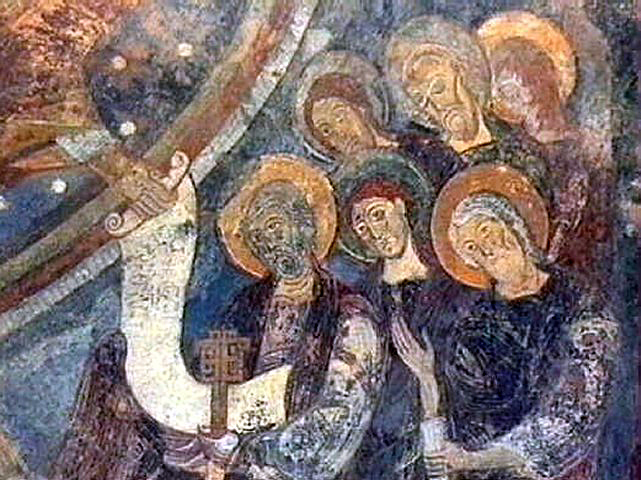
Detail of apostles from Chapel of the Monks of Berzé-la-Ville (about 1100)

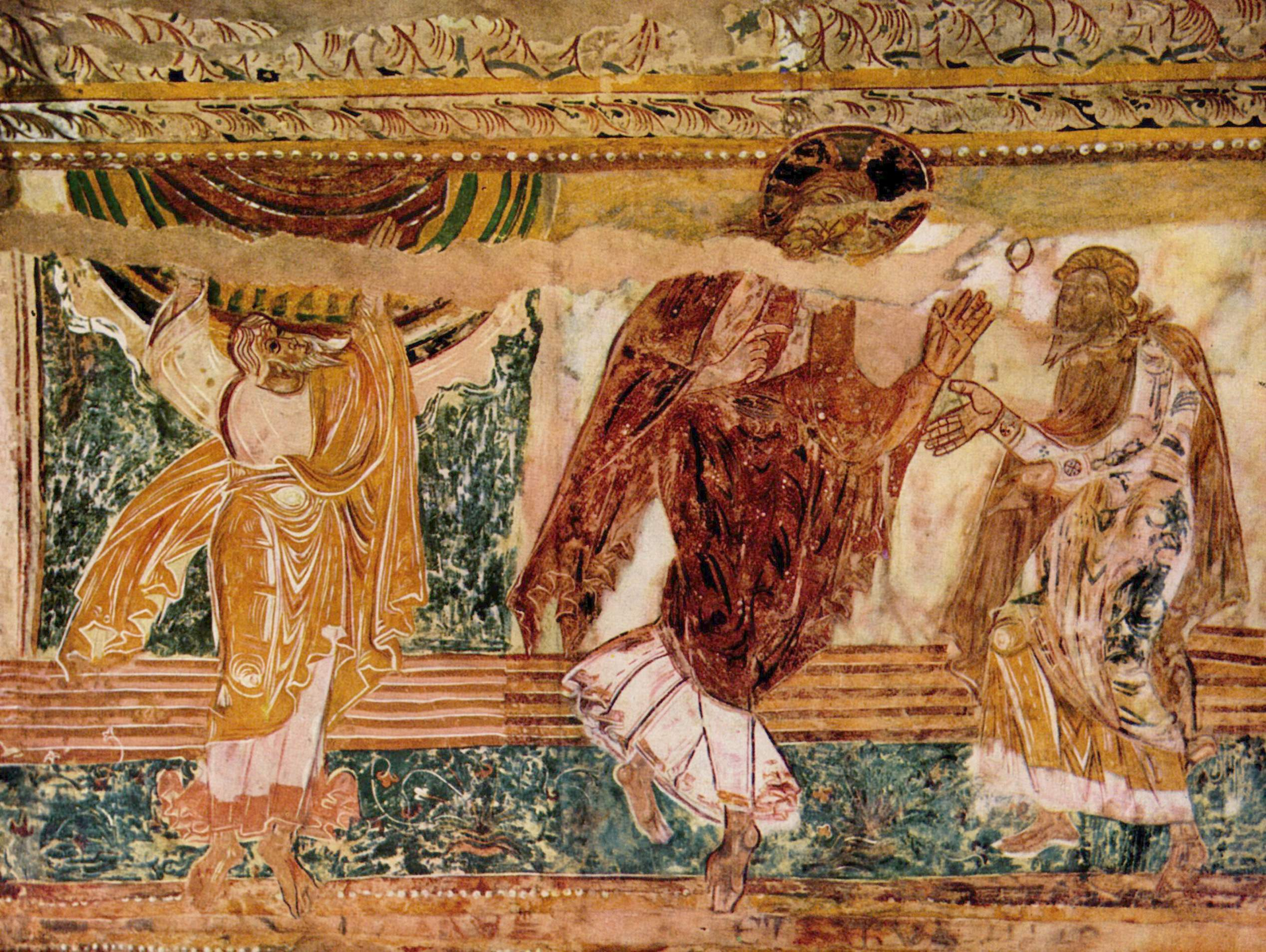
Mural of God speaking to Noah at Abbey Church of Saint-Savin-sur-Gartempe in Poitou

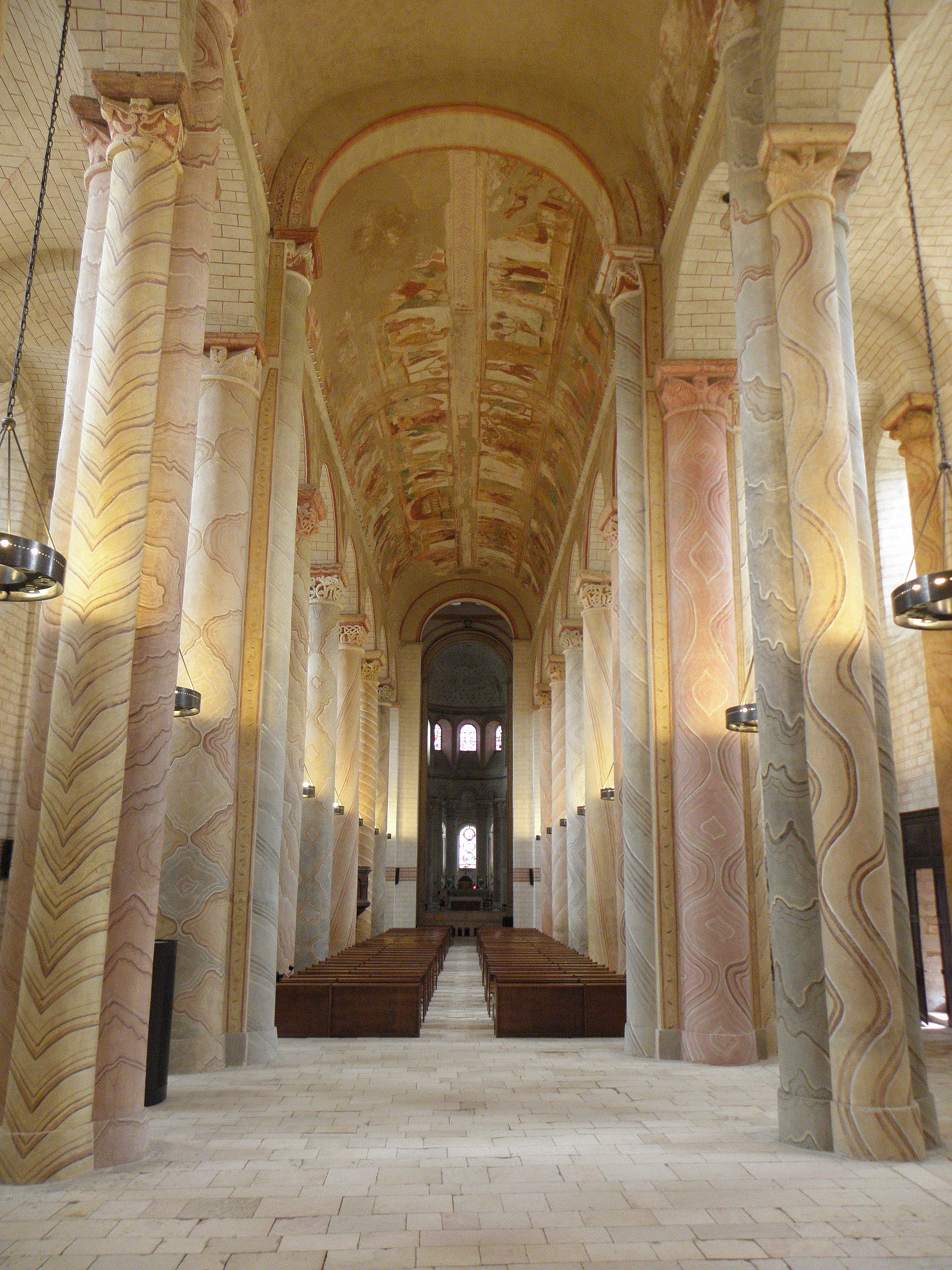
Nave and painted columns of Abbey Church of Saint-Savin-sur-Gartempe in Poitou

=== floor tiles and mosaics ===
Colored or encrusted floor were another form of decoration, assembled into mosaics and geometric designs on floors or walls. The most common tiles were simple baked earth, given a reddish color by iron oxide, mixed with tiles colored yellow by litharge, a form of lead oxide. Darker or lighter colored tiles were made by varying the time of baking. Usually only two colors were used, to give greater harmony.

One of the most notable early examples is the tile floor surrounding the tomb of King Philip I of France, in Fleury Abbey in Saint-Benoît-sur-Loire One of the most famous late examples is the Church of Saint-Pierre-sur-Dives in Calvados, Normandy (13th century). The floor of the nave has a circular design three meters in diameter, made of colorful tiles in concentric circles. alternating yellow on black with black on yellow. The tiles are illustrated with deer, lizards, chimeras, and two-headed eagles, along with flour-des-lys and palmettes.

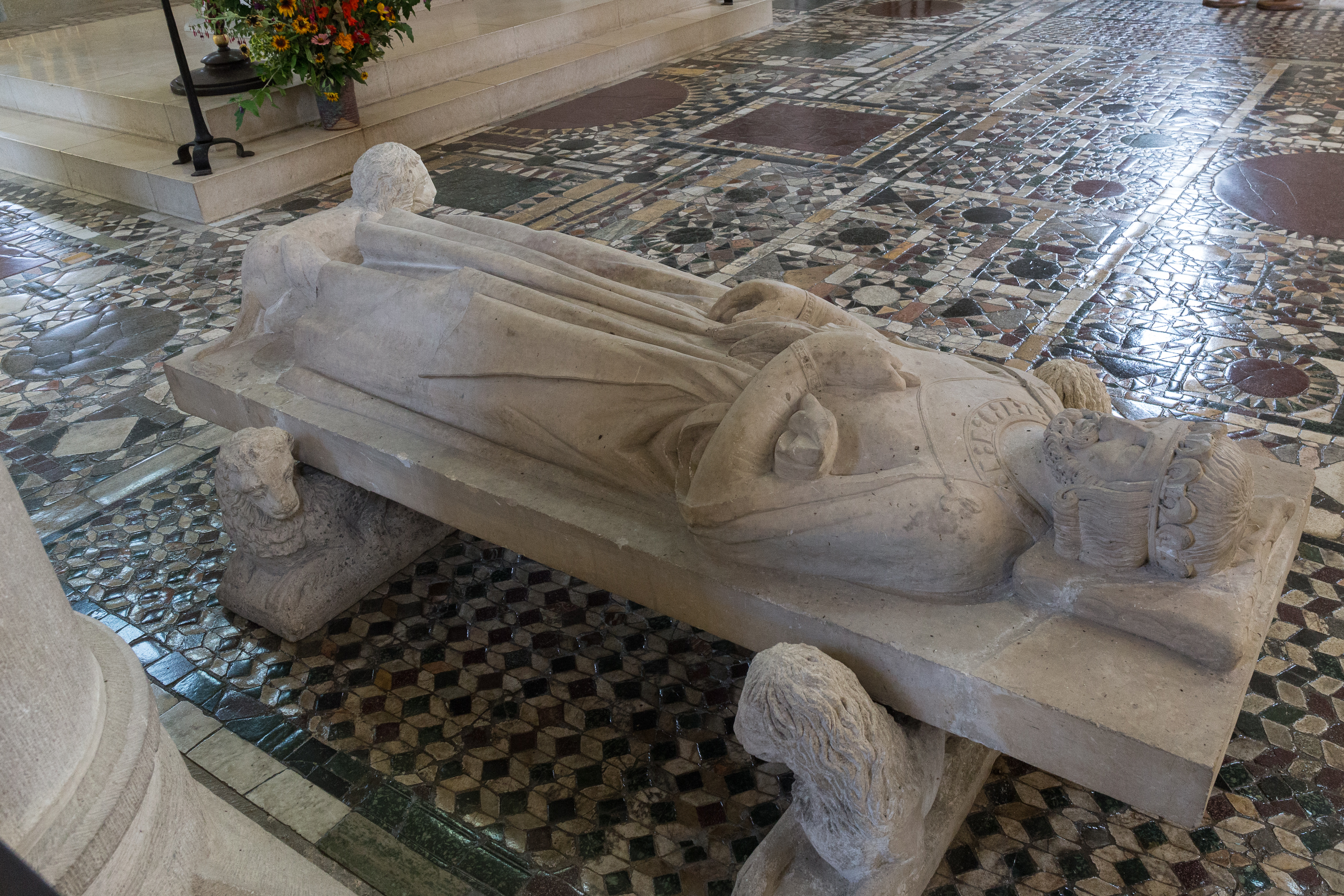
Geometric tile floor in Fleury Abbey in Saint-Benoît-sur-Loire

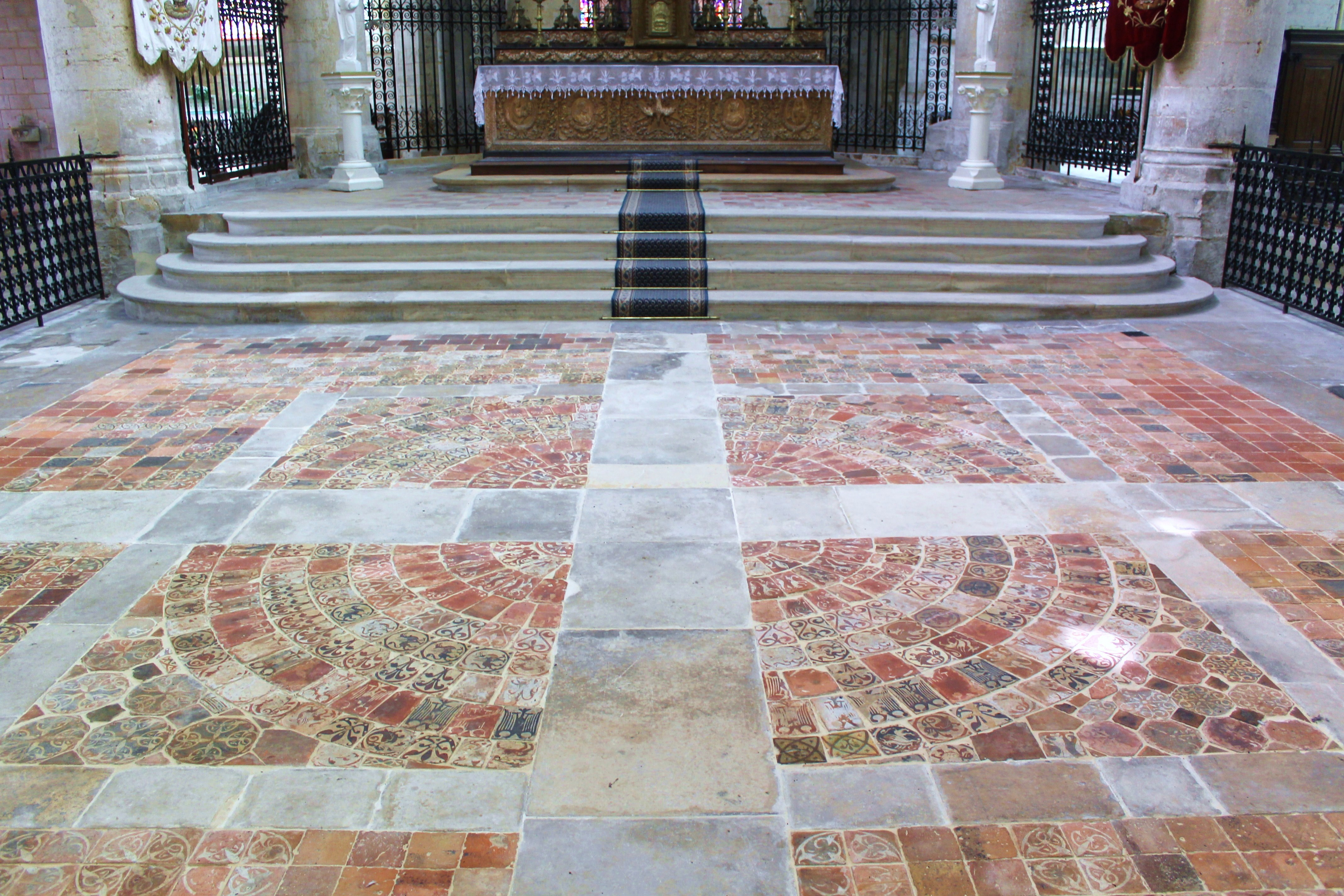
Choir floor of Saint-Pierre-sur-Dives in Calvados

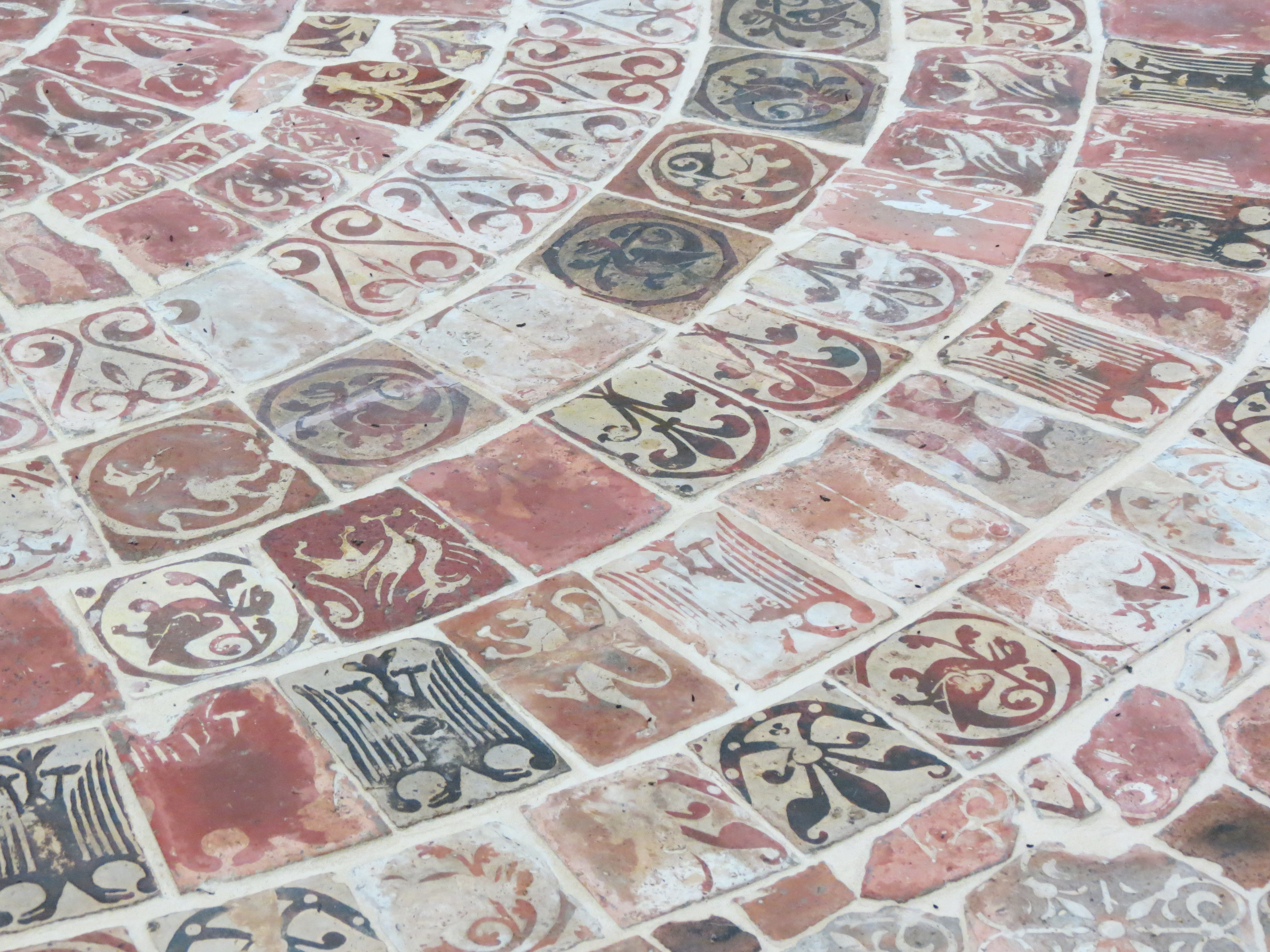
Detail of the choir floor of Saint-Pierre-sur-Dives in Calvados

=== Stained glass ===
The art of making stained glass had been used to make colored glass goblets, bottles, and lamps as early as the 8th century. Early glass window panes appeared in Syria and Egypt in the 8th century, and in France under the Emperor Charlemagne. The earliest glass windows were clear to give maximum light, since the windows were small and the church interiors were already very dark. Clear glass windows appeared during the Romanesque period in the Abbeys of the Cistercians, at Bonlieu Abbey in the Creuse, Aubazine in Corrèze, Saint-Serge in Angers, and others. The glass was very thin, no more than half a centimeter, and very fragile. It was also very difficult to cut, since the use of diamonds to cut glass had not been discovered; glass was cut with heated irons. Cobalt oxide was used to make a fine deep blue, green and red from copper, purple from manganese, and yellow from iron and manganese.

An important development took place in the 11th century, when wooden frames were replaced by frames of lead, which allowed more varied designs and pieces of many different sizes. Very early stained glass windows were in place at the Abbey of Monte Cassino in Italy in 1071. The earliest known stained glass window in France is a head of Christ from the 11th century, which was originally in Weissenburg Abbey, Alsace.

One of the earliest stained glass windows installed in France was the Crucifixion window of Poitiers Cathedral, put in place in The installation of new stained glass windows by the Abbot Suger in the choir of the Abbey of Saint-Denis in the mid-12th century was one of the decisive steps of the transition from the Romanesque to the Gothic style. Thereafter, stained glass, not murals, became the most prominent decorative element of French cathedrals.

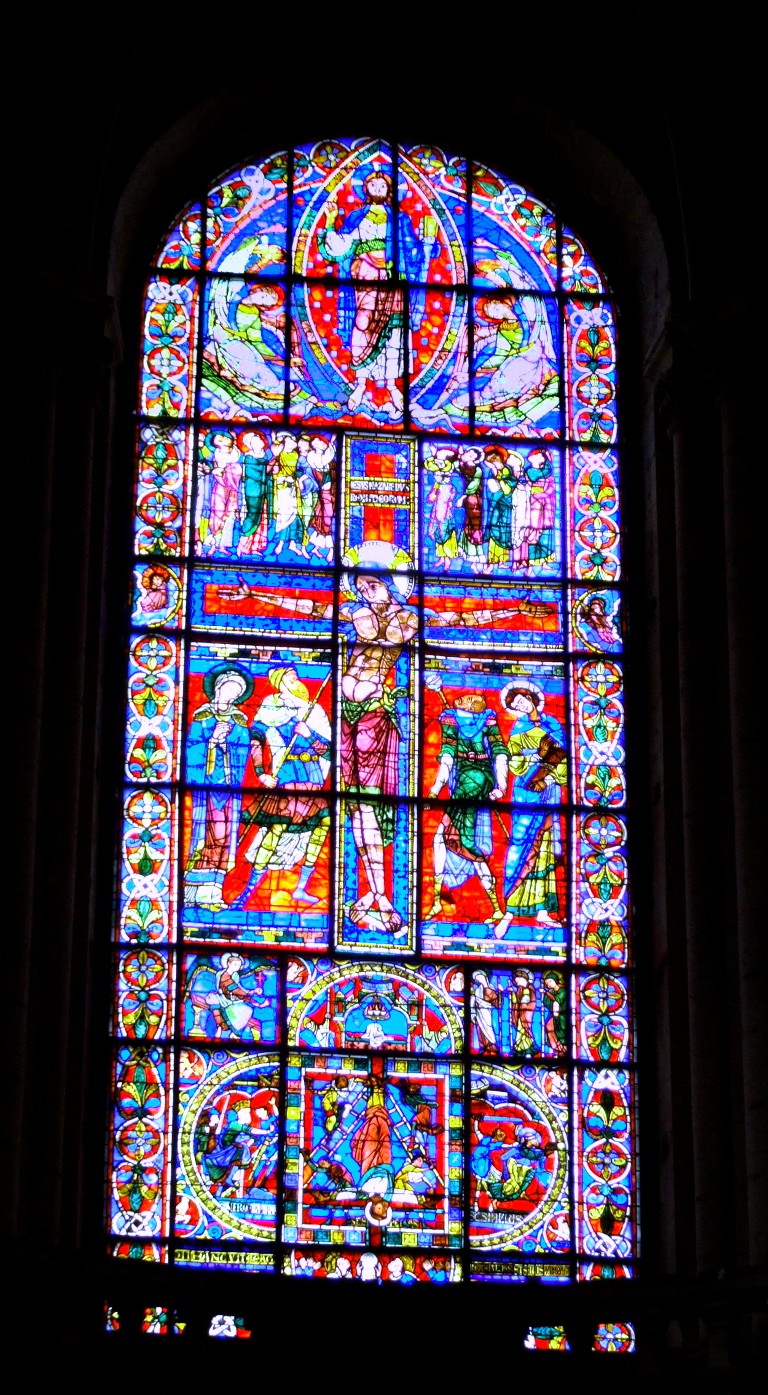
The Crucifixion Window from Poitiers Cathedral (second half of the 12th century)

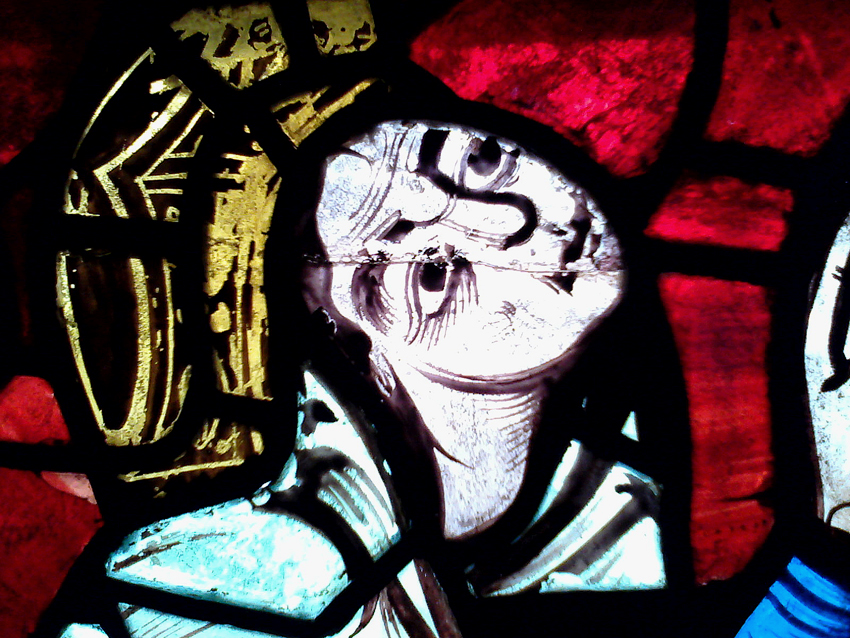
Detail of the Crucifixion Window of Poitiers Cathedral

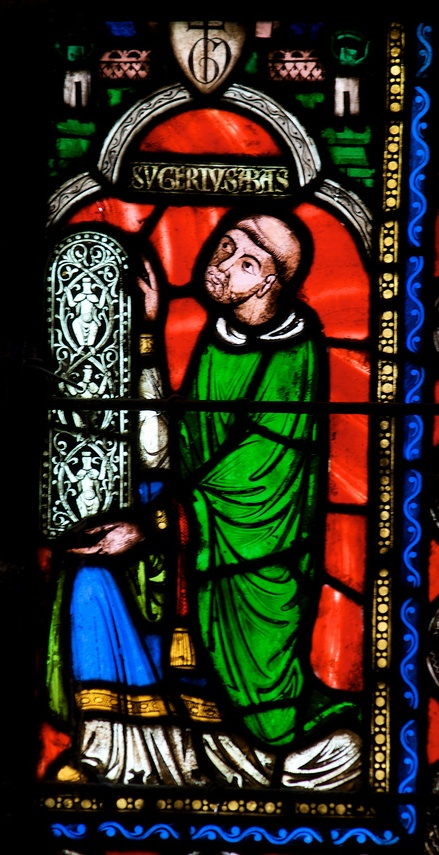
Abbot Suger presents a stained glass window to the Abbey of Saint Denis (1140–44)

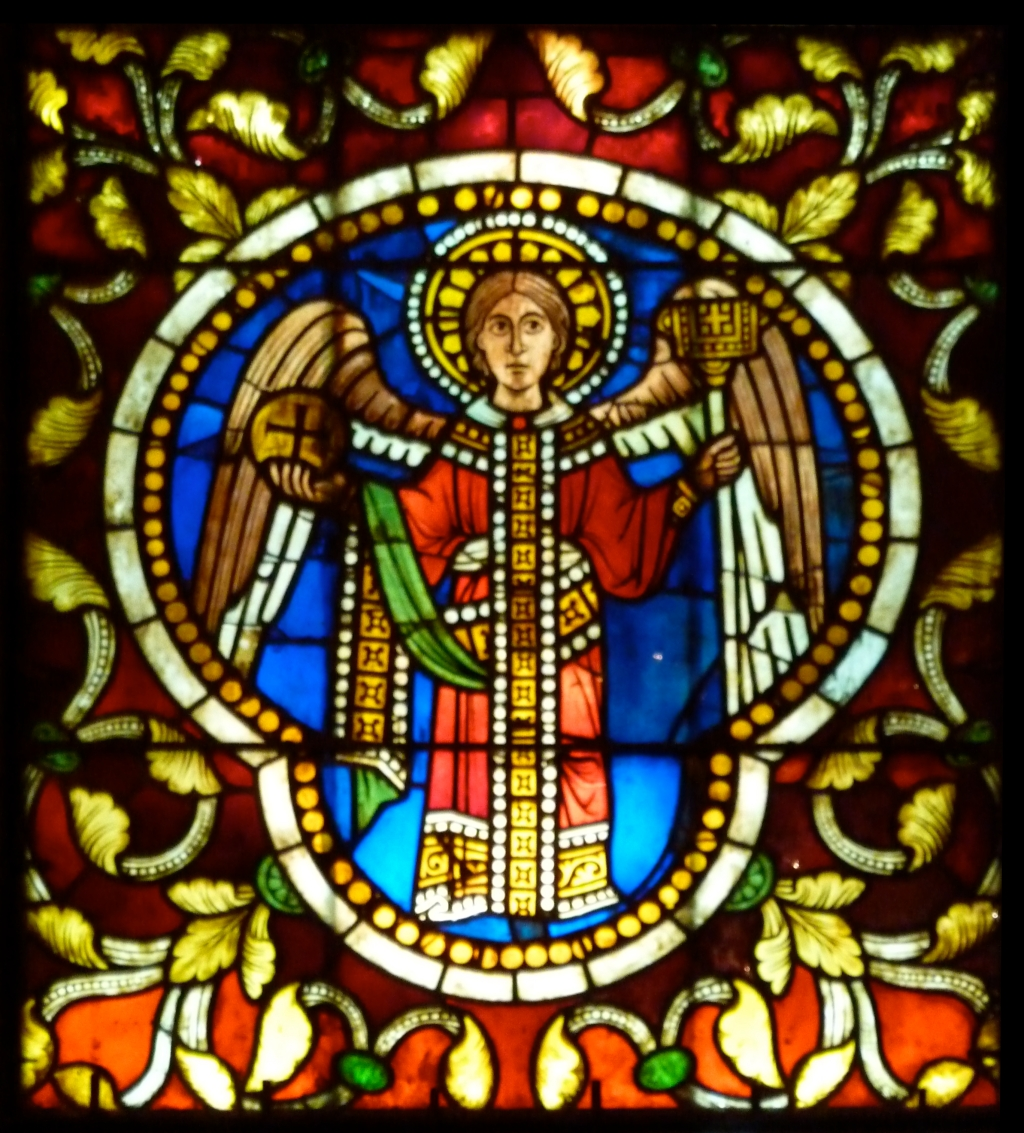
Early stained glass of an angel from the crypt of Strasbourg Cathedral (12th century)

== Military architecture ==
The Romanesque period saw important innovations in military architecture, particularly the development of strong stone-walled keeps and castles. Previously, the residences of nobles and fortifications had usually been built of wooden walls or earthen palisades. The frequency of invasions and wars, and the improvements in siege engines, made it necessary to build stronger fortresses of stone. Only the nobles of the highest level were permitted by the king to build fortified residences. The new castles of the nobility were not only military defenses, but also symbols of the rank and power of the nobles.

The typical castles of this period had a high tower, called a donjon or keep, usually surrounded by a lower wall, called a shell keep. The earliest were rectangular, but were usually replaced by a round or octagonal tower. The earliest surviving vestiges are at Doué le Fontaine in Maine-et-Loire (about 950). and Langeais (about 1017). Fulk Nerra, Count of Anjou, built several early stone castles, including the great tower of Loches.

The Caesar Tower in Provins from the beginning of the 12th century, has an octagonal tower flanked by four semi-circular towers, all placed on top of a stone platform seventeen meters by seventeen meters. A walkway midway up the main tower gives access to the corner towers. The whole structure is surrounded by another wall, the shell keep, on the ground level.

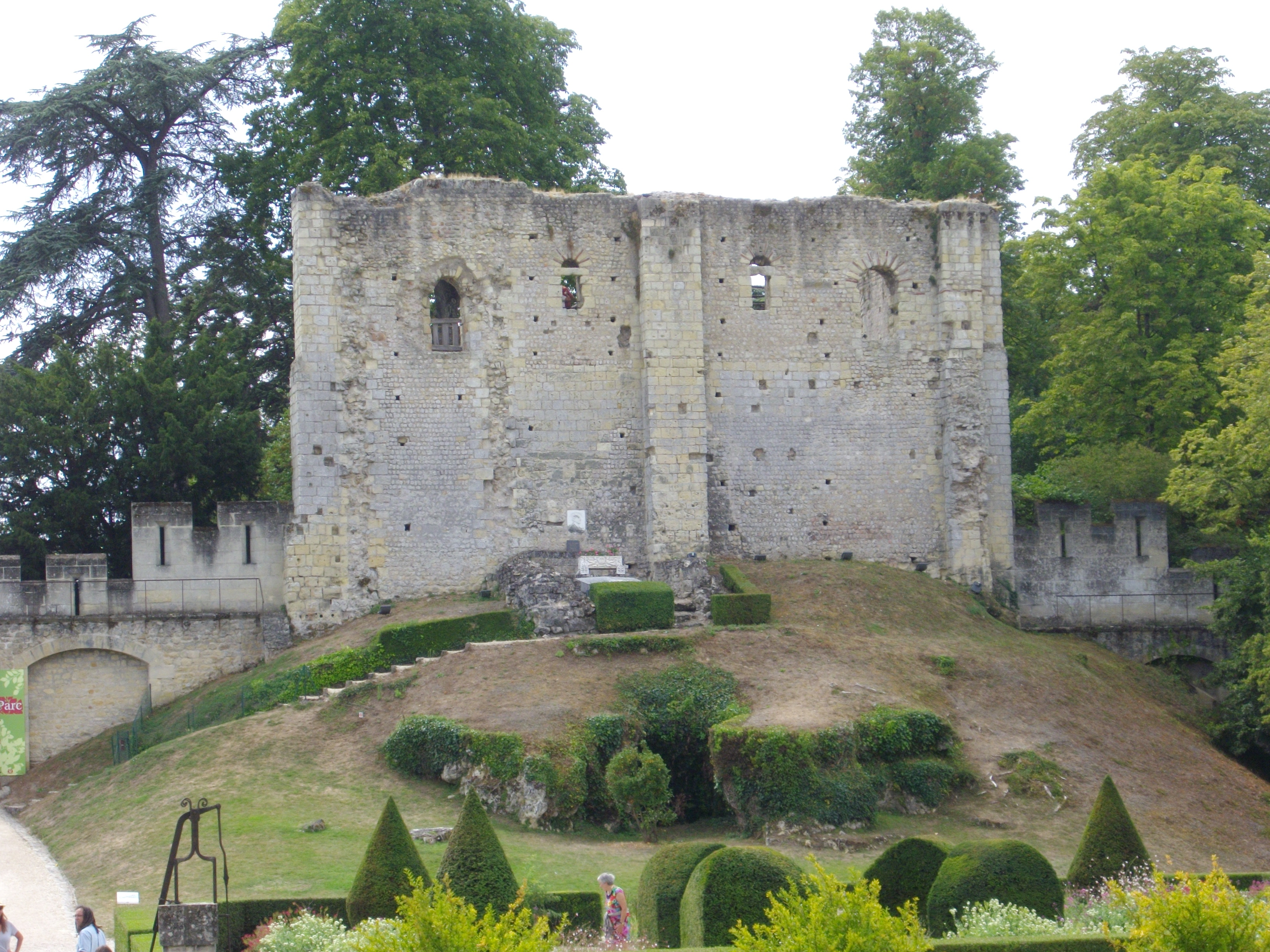
The fortified hall at Langeais

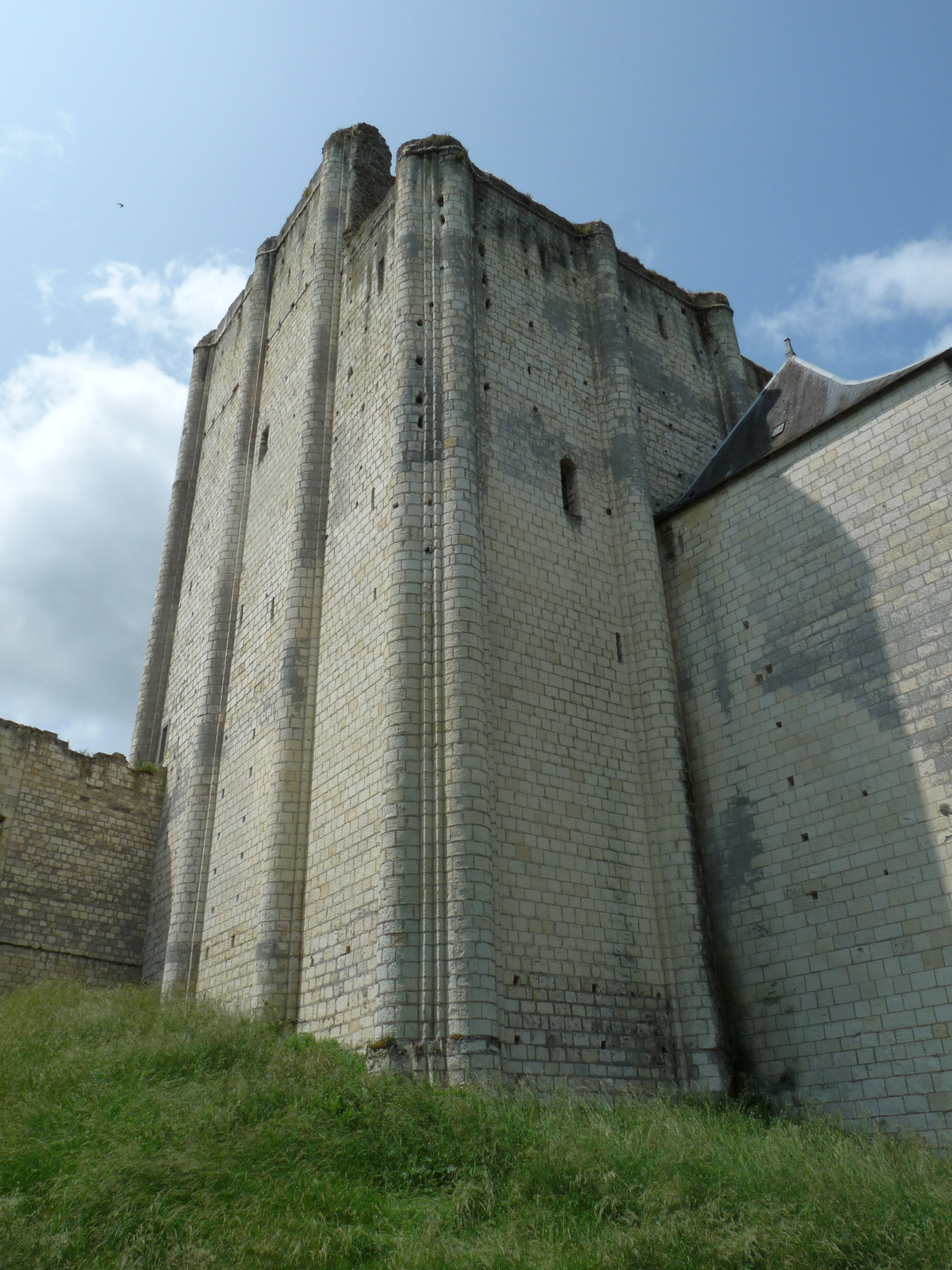
The early donjon at Loches

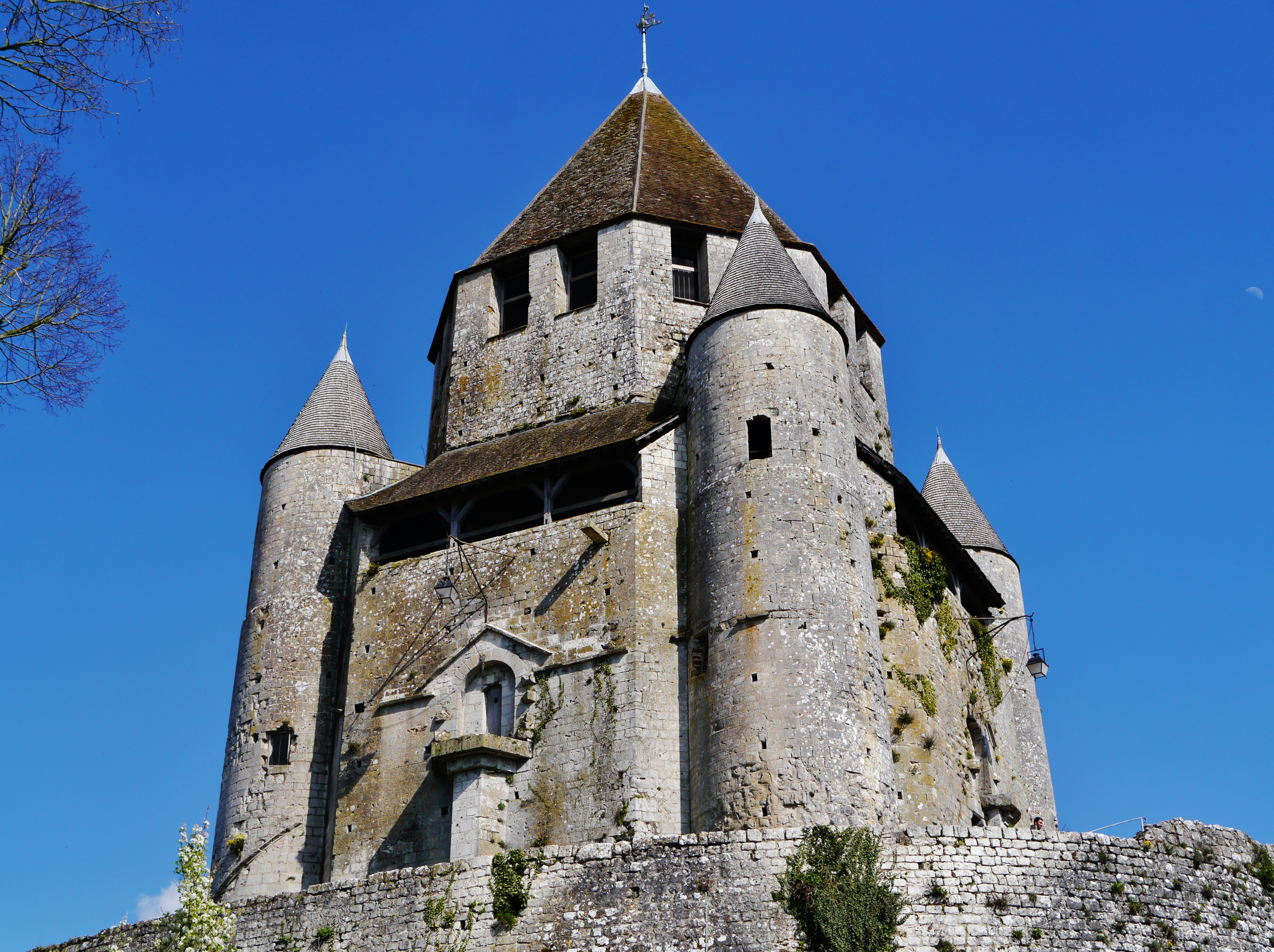
The Caesar Tower in Provins (beginning of 12th century), an octagonal donjon or tower surrounded by a "shell keep", or lower wall (early 12th century)

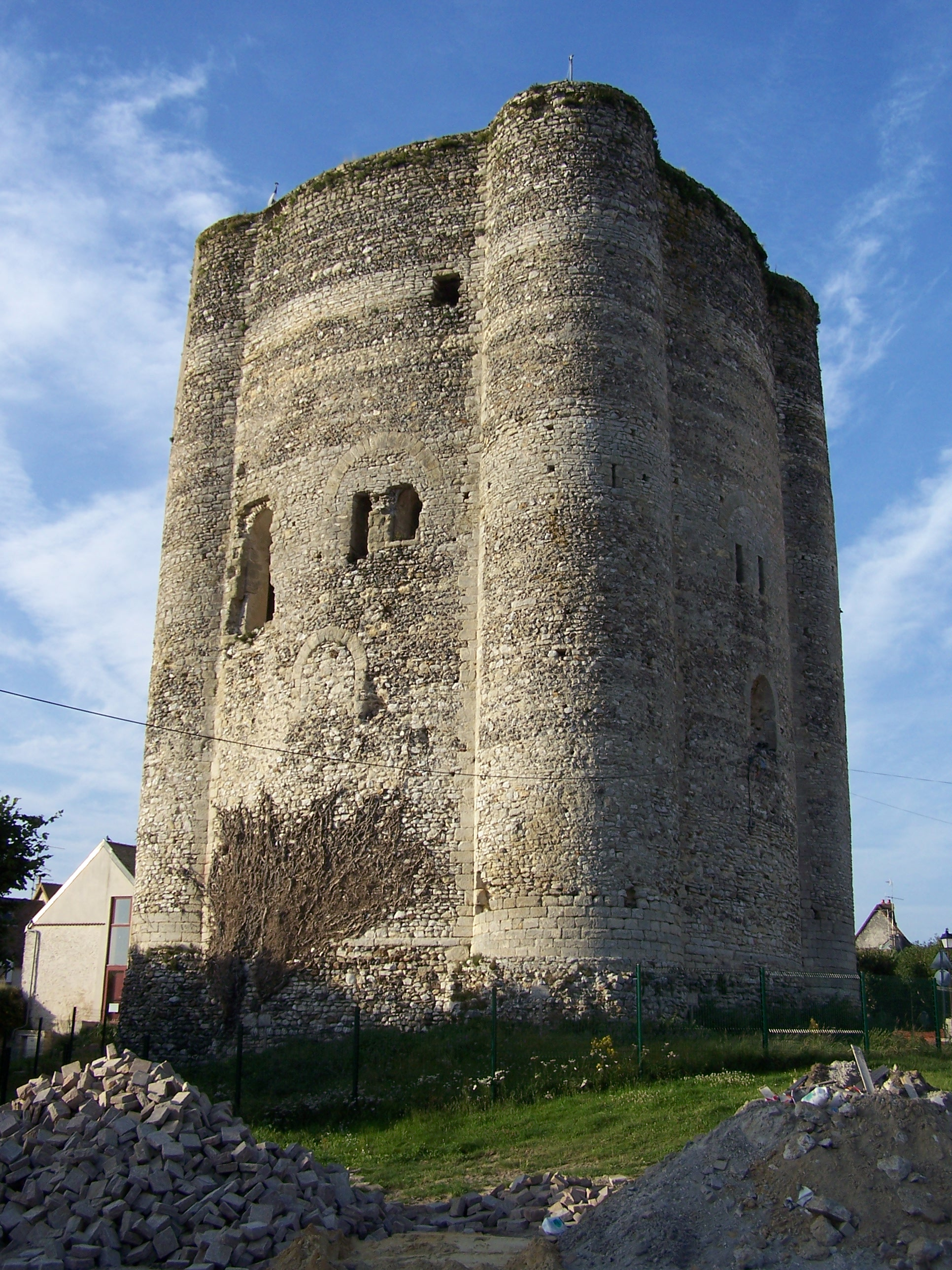
The Donjon de Houdan in Yvelines, (beginning of 12th century)

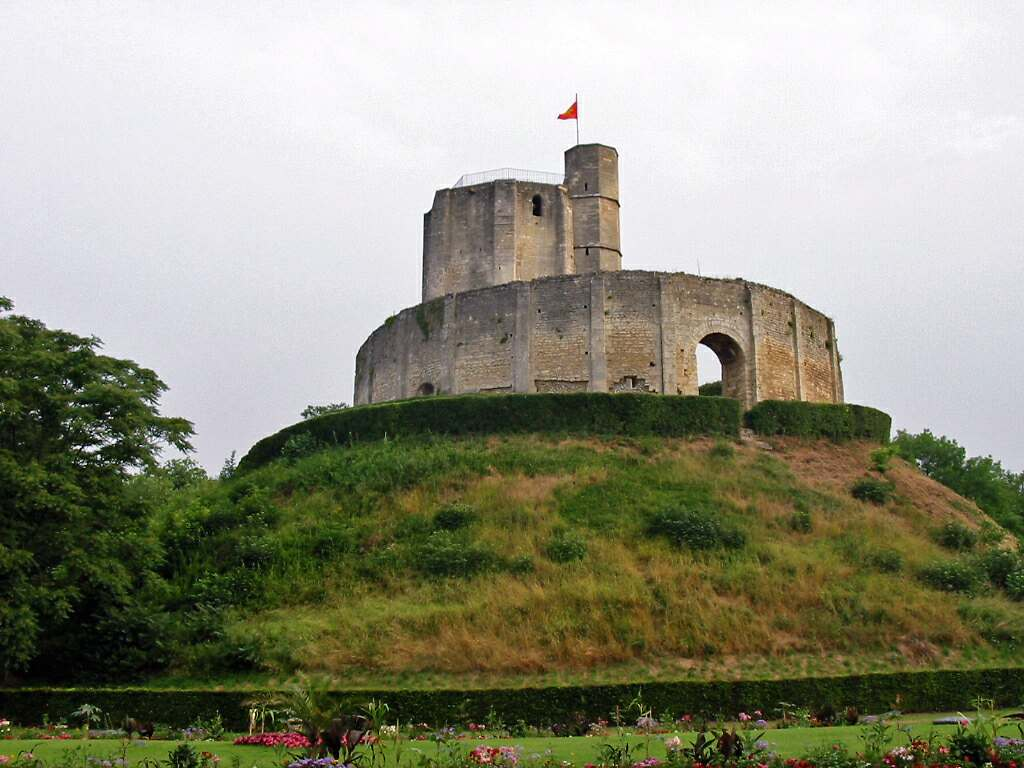
The Château de Gisors in the Eure built by the Dukes of Normandy. (tower from about 1170, shell keep from the 12th century)

== Urban architecture ==
Only a small amount of urban architecture from the period remains, and many of those buildings were abundantly and not always skillfully altered in later centuries. The main examples are the episcopal palaces of bishops, notably in Auxerre and in Saint-Antonin. Their principal features are galleries and arcades along the length of the facade. on the facade. One famous example Romanesque civic architecture is the Pont Saint-Bénézet, better known as the Bridge of Avignon. Three arches of the original bridge survive, along with the Romanesque chapel of Saint-Bénézet, with a polygonal abside and a nave with barrel vaults

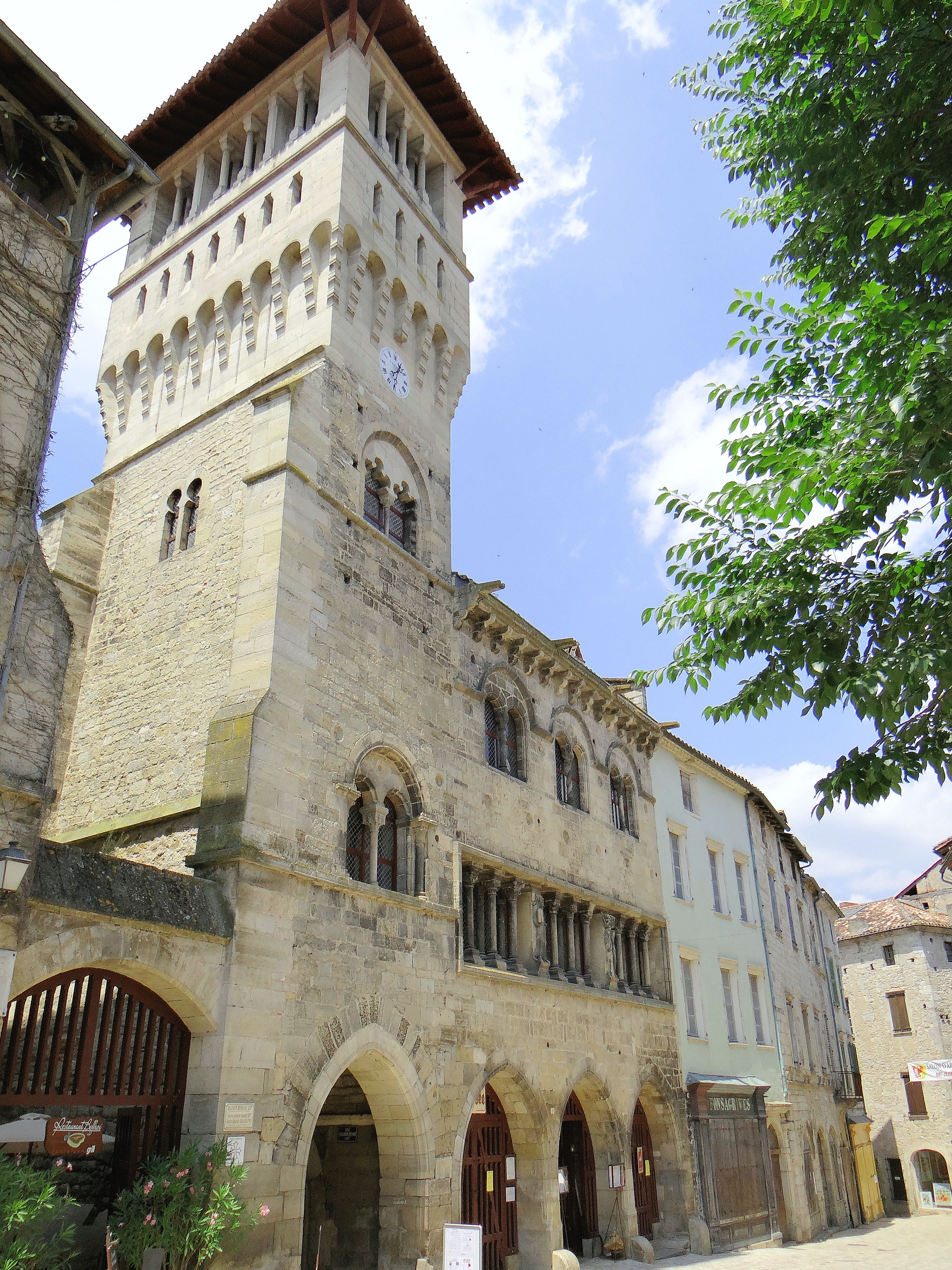
Former bishop's residence, the Hotel Granolhet in Saint-Antonin (12th century)

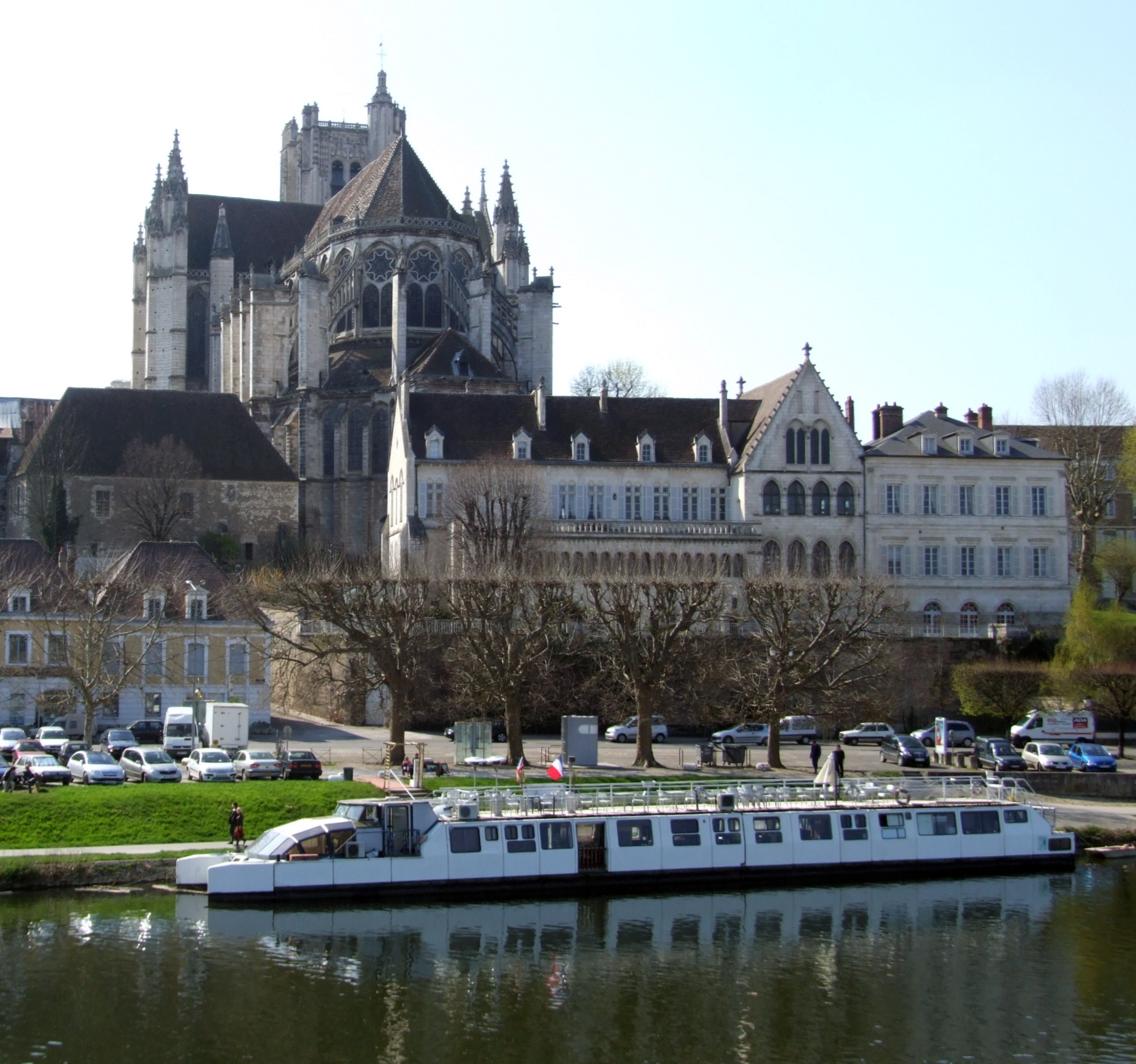
Former Bishop's residence, with the original Romanesque gallery, in Auxerre (12th century)

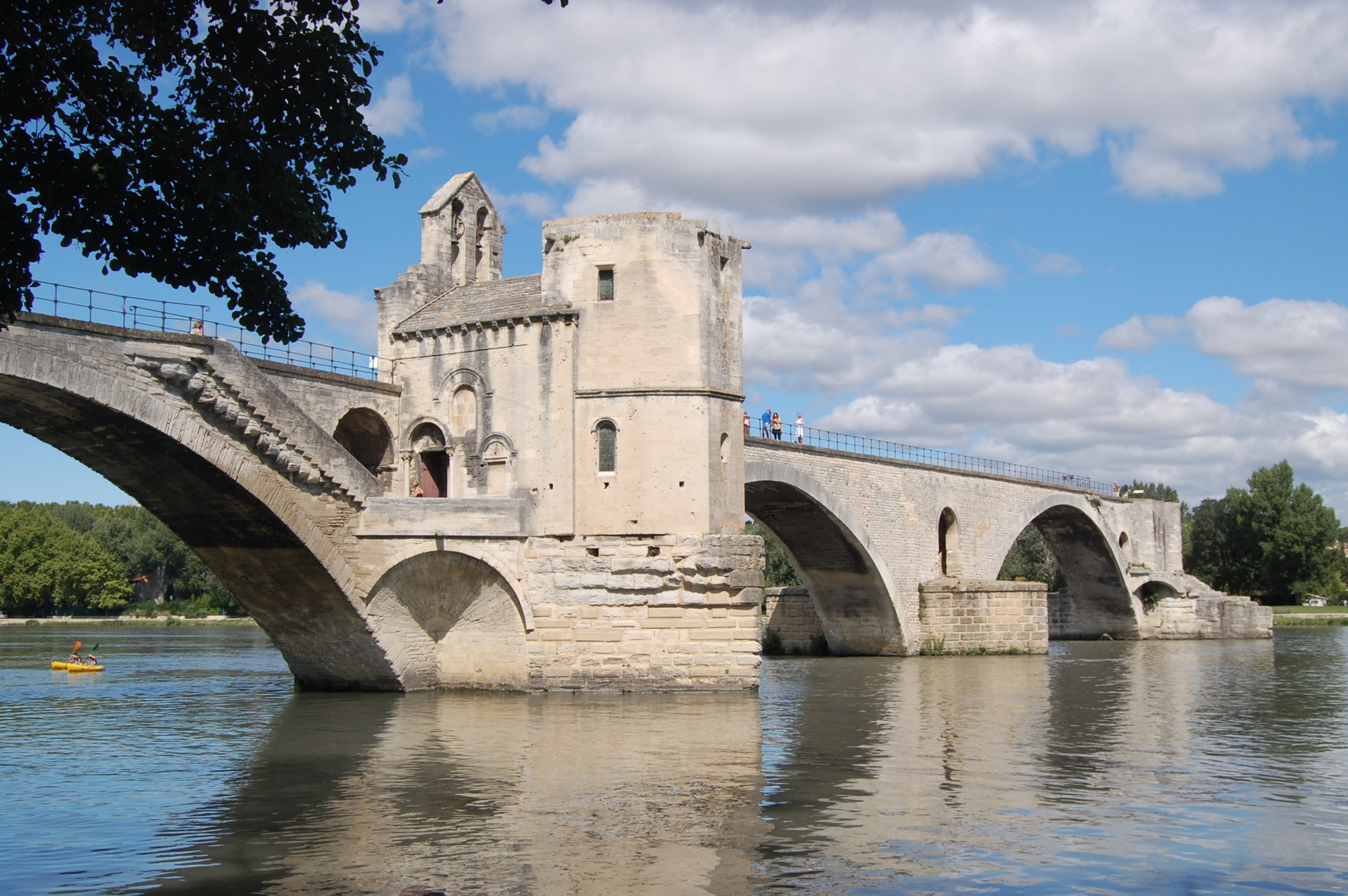
The Chapel Saint-Bénezet on the Pont Saint-Bénézet, or Bridge of Avignon (second half of 12th century)

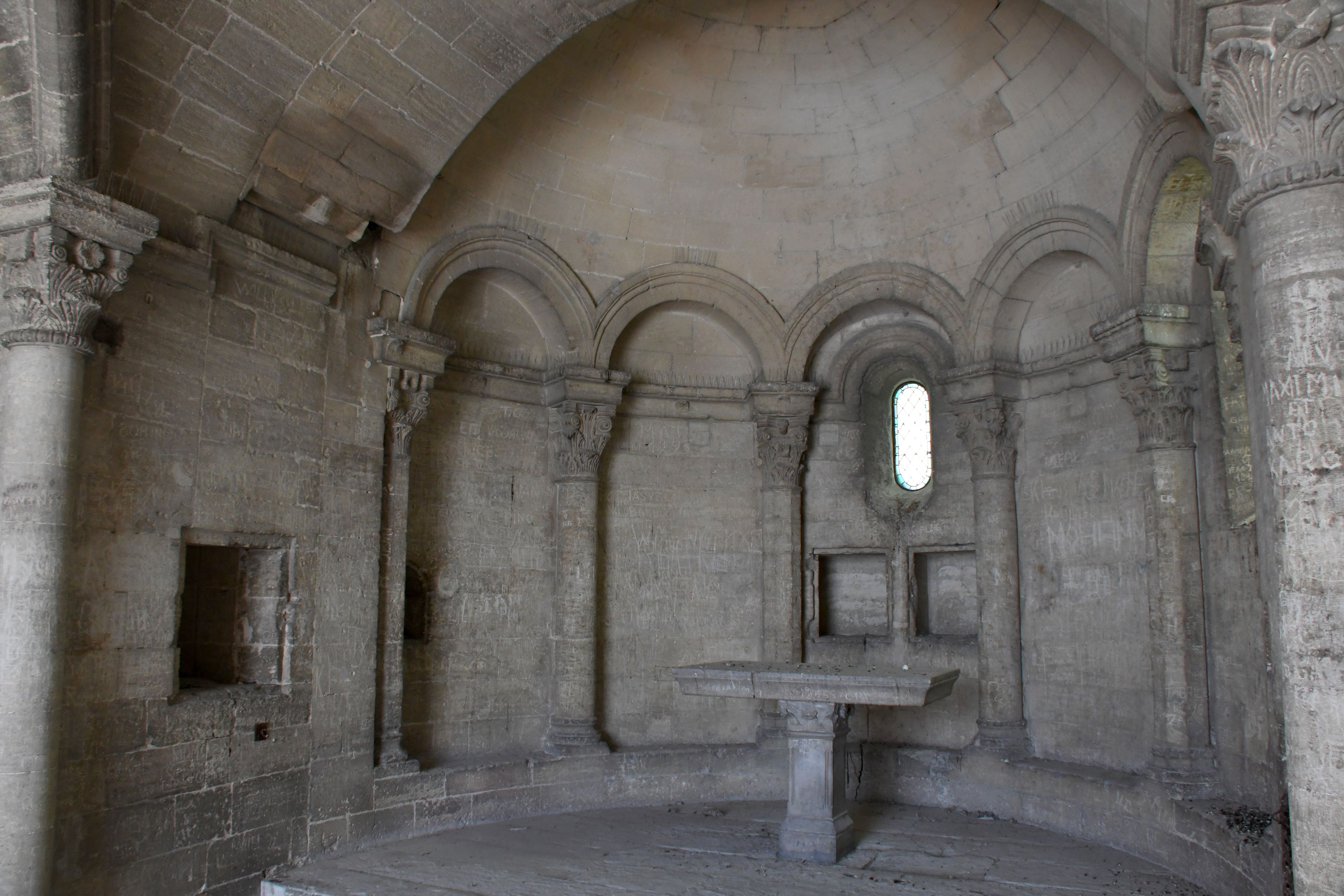
Interior of the chapel on the Pont Saint-Bénézet in Avignon

== Bibliography ==
- Aubert, Marcel; Goubet, Simone (1966). Romanesque Cathedrals and Abbeys of France. Nicholas Vane.
- Ducher, Robert (1998). Caractéristique des Styles (in French). Flammarion. ISBN 2-08-011539-1.
- De Morant, Henry (1970). Histoire des arts décoratifs (in French). Hachette.
- Erland-Brandenburg, Alain (2005). L'art roman- Un défi européen (in French). Gallimard. ISBN 2-07-030068-4.
- Hopkins, Owen (2014). Les styles en architecture (in French). Dunod. ISBN 978-2-10-070689-1.
- Mignon, Olivier (2017). Architecture du Patrimoine Française - Abbayes, Églises, Cathédrales et Châteaux (in French). Éditions Ouest-France. ISBN 978-27373-7611-5.
- Prina, Francesca; Demartini, Elena (2006). Petite encylopédie de l'architecture (in French). Paris: Solar. ISBN 2-263-04096-X.
- Renault, Christophe; Lazé, Christophe (2006). Les Styles de l'architecture et du mobilier (in French). Gisserot. ISBN 978-2-87747-465-8.
- Texier, Simon (2012). Paris- Panorama de l'architecture. Parigramme. ISBN 978-2-84096-667-8.
- Toman, Rolf (2015). L'Art Roman - Architecture, Sculpture, Peinture (in French). H.F. Ullmann. ISBN 978-3-8331-1039-9.
