= 747th Tank Battalion (United States) =

- Active: 5 May 1942 – 6 March 1946; 9 December 1946 – 31 January 1954; 7 October 1954 – 15 September 1956
- Country: United States
- Allegiance: Army
- Type: Tank/Armor
- Size: Battalion
- Part of: Independent Unit
- Equipment: M4 Sherman; M5 Stuart
- Engagements: World War II: Normandy with Arrowhead; Northern France; Rhineland; Central Europe

Insignia
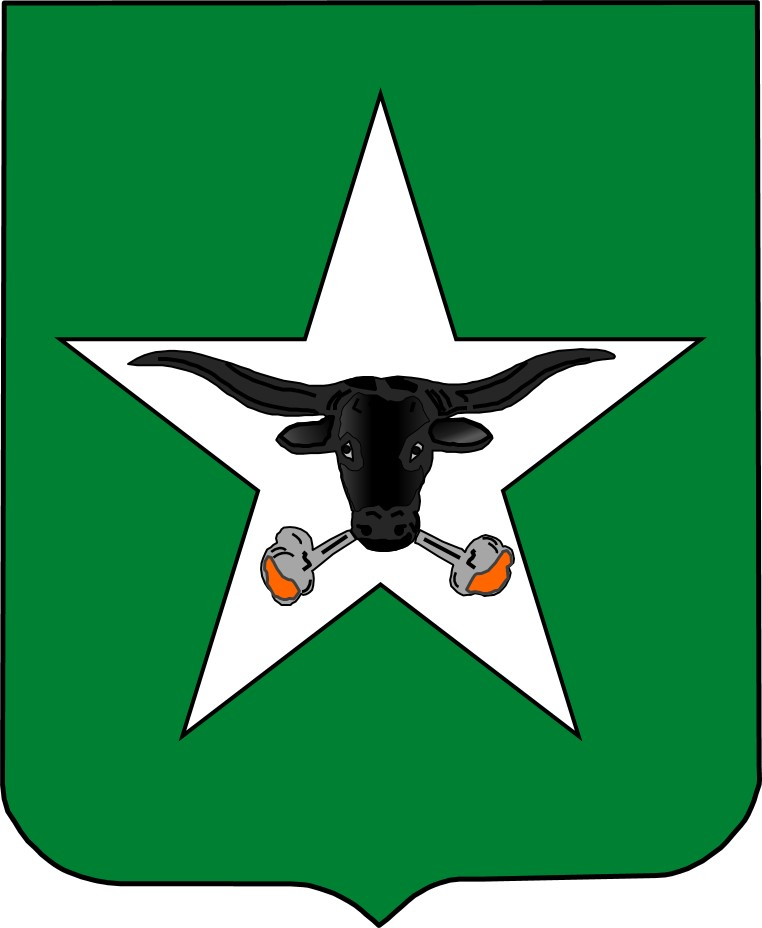
- 747th Tank Battalion Distinctive Unit Insignia

The 747th Tank Battalion was an independent tank battalion that participated in the European Theater of Operations with the United States Army in World War II. It was credited with an assault landing at Normandy, landing the morning after the initial D-Day landings (D+1). The battalion participated in combat operations throughout northern Europe until V-E Day, primarily attached to the 29th Infantry Division. After the war it was briefly engaged in occupation duties. Redesignated the 747th Amphibian Tank Battalion on 10 July 1945, it was inactivated in March 1946.

The battalion was reactivated in December 1946 as a reserve unit. The unit was called into active military service as the 747th Amphibious Tank and Tractor Battalion at the start of the Korean War but did not deploy overseas. It was released from active duty in September 1953 and inactivated in January 1954. It was redesignated the 723rd Tank Battalion and activated in October 1954. While active, it served as the test unit for a maneuver exercise in conjunction with Operation Teapot Shot Apple-2 atomic testing in May 1955. The 723rd Tank Battalion was inactivated in September 1956.

== Organization ==
The 747th Tank Battalion followed the standard organization of a U.S. medium tank battalion during World War II. It consisted of a Headquarters and Headquarters Company, Service Company, three medium tank companies (Companies A, B, and C) and a light tank company (Company D).

- The Headquarters Company included the battalion headquarters staff, both officers and enlisted men; an assault gun platoon, consisting of three Sherman tank variants armed with a short-barreled 105 mm assault gun; a mortar platoon, equipped with three half-track-mounted 81 mm mortars; a reconnaissance platoon with five quarter-ton "peeps" (jeeps); and the headquarters tank section consisting of two tanks for the battalion commander and operations officer. The assault gun platoon was sometimes attached to the division artillery of the division to which the battalion was attached, especially if the division had to revert to the defense or static positions.

- The Service Company included a headquarters section; a maintenance platoon; and a large battalion supply and transportation platoon, with over thirty trucks to provide logistics for the battalion.

- Companies A, B, C, and D – the tank line companies, both medium and light, followed nearly the same table of organization. Each company consisted of a headquarters section which, along with a small headquarters staff which included two tanks for the company commander and executive officer (the medium tank companies also had an assault gun assigned to the headquarters section, which was occasionally consolidated with the assault guns in the headquarters company to mass the firepower); and three five-tank platoons. The medium tank companies were equipped with M4 Sherman tanks, while the light tank company was equipped with M5 Stuart tanks. All four companies had their own maintenance section which included a M32 Tank Recovery Vehicle, built on a Sherman chassis. Because the Stuart carried a 4-man crew versus a 5-man crew on the Sherman, the light tank company had a lower personnel strength than then medium tank companies.

== World War II history ==
=== Activation and deployment ===
The 747th Tank Battalion was activated at Camp Bowie, Texas on 10 November 1942 as the 747th Tank Battalion (Medium). The battalion embarked from New York on 11 February 1944 and arrived in England on 23 February 1944.

=== Normandy landings and breakout in France ===
Although not part of the initial assault landings for Operation Overlord on 6 June 1944, the first elements of the battalion landed on Omaha Beach on D+1, 7 June, at 0700. Two platoons of Company C assisted in taking Vierville-sur-Mer by 1300. By afternoon most of battalion had landed and was attached to the 175th Infantry Regiment, 29th Infantry Division for an attack on Isigny-sur-Mer. Isigny was taken by 0300 on 9 June.

Also upon landing on 7 June, two platoons of Company B were initially attached to 18th Infantry Regiment, 1st Infantry Division, and advanced on Mandeville-en-Bessin. Similarly, Company D was attached to the 2nd Battalion, 38th Infantry Regiment, 2nd Infantry Division, in order to advance along the axis Trévières – Cerisy-la-Forêt – Saint-Quentin-d’Elle – Saint-Georges-d'Elle. Although nominally attached to the 1st Infantry Division for the landings through 13 June, elements of the battalion had already also been attached to the 2nd Infantry Division and 29th Infantry Division, and by 15 June the battalion was attached solely to the 29th Infantry Division. Under 29th Infantry Division control, the battalion was placed in division reserve in the vicinity of Saint-Jean-de-Savigny until 10 July, allowing them to replace lost equipment and personnel and to perform maintenance on the equipment which had been in nonstop use their first week ashore in Normandy. This inactivity also reflected the fact that although the infantry and tanks had practiced the beach landings together, there had been no training to fight together once they moved inland.

After this extended period in reserve, the battalion supported the 29th Infantry Division as they advanced on Saint-Lô, with a platoon of Company C among the first units to enter the town on 18 July. During this advance the battalion discovered the difficulties of attacking in the famous Normandy bocage, and developed one of several hedgerow cutter tank attachments the forces in Normandy invented to penetrate the dense hedgerows. After this intense fighting the battalion again went into division reserve from 20–28 July. While in reserve, the battalion reorganized and transferred personnel within the battalion to fill critical positions, as well as conducting intense combined arms training with the infantry and engineers, and developing a more efficient hedgerow cutter similar to the "Rhino device" that was appearing in other tank units in Normandy at this time.

The battalion moved south of Saint-Lô to the vicinity of Saint-Samson-de-Bonfossé on 28 July. Despite not being committed into the line, the battalion was sporadically shelled and bombed from the air. On 1 August, the battalion supported the infantry attacks south from Saint-Lô and by 7 August had outflanked Vire to the west and were located near Saint-Germain-de-Tallevende. At St. Germain, they defended against fierce local counterattacks conducted by some of the most experienced German units on the Western front, including the 1st SS Panzer Division and the 116th Panzer Division, losing ten Shermans to Panzerfaust and antitank gunfire by 10 August. At this time, the light tanks from Company D were used for liaison and resupply missions for the infantry due to the large number of German infiltrators in the fluid combat situation. At least one light tank was lost behind friendly lines conducting this mission.

On 17 August, the battalion was detached from the 29th Infantry Division and attached directly to V Corps and placed on two-hour alert to move. While in this status, the battalion continued to train with the 29th, stressing combined arms operations with their infantry and artillery counterparts. On 20 August, the battalion was attached to the 90th Infantry Division, moving first to Sées and Nonant-le-Pin. The battalion was then detached from the 90th on 23 August and reverted to V Corps control. Under corps control, the 747th then rushed forward to Limours by 25 August and took up positions near Sceaux on 27 August. On 28 August, the battalion was attached to the 4th Infantry Division, crossing the Seine and advancing to Neuilly-sur-Marne on 29 August.

Continuing a rapid advance to the north with the objective of Brussels, the battalion passed to the west of Villers-Cotterêts and Soissons and through Laon. North of Laon, the battalion began to encounter retreating Germans from the west. This resulted in several sharp engagements on 2–3 September around Le Hérie-la-Viéville, Guise, and Landrecies, destroying some 50 enemy vehicles (many of them horse-drawn) while suffering only light casualties. The battalion turned west toward Le Pommereuil to face the threat from the retreating Germans. While clearing the woods to the east of the town, the battalion took some 350 prisoners.

With this threat under control, on 4 September Company A was detached from the battalion and joined the 22nd Infantry Regiment as they resumed the advance to the east, toward Rocroi. From there elements of Company A assisted in securing two bridgeheads across the Meuse River at Monthermé and Fumay on 5 September. On 6 September, the battalion was relieved from attachment to the 4th Infantry Division and reassembled in the vicinity of Rocroi.

After this rapid advance across France, the tanks were badly in need of repair. After closing on the assembly area near Rocroi, the battalion used the time to replace worn track and engines. This involved so many vehicles that the battalion had to create a "composite company" consisting of the serviceable tanks from all three medium tank companies to support offensive operations of the 4th Infantry Division. This composite company was attached directly to the 4th Infantry Division and spearheaded the drive toward Bastogne, reaching the town on 11 September. The next day, the composite company was split, with two platoons supporting the 12th Infantry Regiment as it pushed to Vielsalm and Rodt while the remaining platoon supported the 22nd Infantry Regiment as it drove toward Maldingen and Grüfflingen. By 14 September, all elements of the composite company had returned to an assembly area near Beho, Belgium. The remainder of the battalion had repaired enough vehicles and found enough fuel to rejoin the composite company at its assembly area near Beho on the afternoon of 15 September. The pause, even while the two regiments of the 4th Infantry Division pushed forward, represented the end of the breakout and pursuit which had begun less than two months earlier in Normandy.

=== Siegfried Line ===
As soon as the 747th Tank Battalion had reassembled at Beho on 15 September, it was detached from the 4th Infantry Division and attached to the 28th Infantry Division. Companies B and C supported the 109th Infantry Regiment as they advanced on Harspelt and Sevenig across the Siegfried Line. German indirect fire and bad weather hindered the advance and after two days of fighting the Americans withdrew to their initial positions. On 17 September, the battalion was assigned to the 110th Infantry Regiment and attacked south from Eichenbusch early on 19 September. This time, resistance was lighter, and the Americans penetrated the Siegfried Line, with dozer tanks piling dirt over all pillbox openings, rendering nearly 40 pillboxes inoperable over the next three days. Resting briefly after these attacks, the battalion was once again attached on 26 September 1944 to the 29th Infantry Division, which had just returned to the Allied advance and was assigned to the XIX Corps after successfully reducing the German stronghold at Brest, with orders to move into Holland, and then to Kinrooi, Belgium.

Now under XIX Corps control, on 28 September 1944, Company B was attached to the 2nd Tank Destroyer Group in support of the Belgium Brigade. The Belgium Brigade was on the extreme right flank of the British Second Army and 21st Army Group, and had the mission to clear the Germans from the area to the west of the Wessem-Nederweert Canal and Maas Rivers and to cover the commitment of the 7th Armored Division into the line. Intelligence reports had severely underestimated the German forces opposing them and the flat, open, marshy terrain poorly supported tank maneuver. The attack bogged down in the first few days of October 1944, and Company B saw little further action with the Belgians and was mainly employed for indirect fire support, operating near Neeritter. They were released from the 2nd Tank Destroyer Group on 3 November and reverted to battalion control.

On 30 September 1944, Company C was attached to the 113th Cavalry Group in the vicinity of Haag, Belgium. The 113th Cavalry Group was tasked to attack northward along the eastern bank of the Maas River, opposite the Belgium Brigade, toward Wessem. Like the Belgians, the cavalry group and the supporting tanks of Company C made little progress against unexpectedly stout resistance. The 113th Cavalry Group reverted to an economy of force mission and effectively went into defense to maintain contact between the left flank of the American 12th Army Group and First Army and the British right flank. This placed the 747th Tank Battalion in the unique position of having a company operating on either side of the army group boundary. After reaching its local objective at Isenbruch, Germany, Company C was released from the 113th Cavalry Group on 5 October and reverted to battalion control.

While Companies B and C were detached, Companies A and D, or parts of them, sporadically provided support to the 115th Infantry Regiment as it advanced northward toward limited objectives in the open plain to the northeast of Geilenkirchen, Germany during the first week of October 1944. On 7 October, the battalion, minus Company B, went into division reserve. They remained in this role through the end of the month, using the opportunity to conduct maintenance and training.

On 31 October, the battalion, still minus Company B, moved to Merkstein, approximately 10 km south of Geilenkirchen. They remained at Merkstein until 15 November, focusing on combined arms training with the infantry, and also had radios (enabling infantry-armor communications) and flame throwers installed on selected tanks in the medium tank companies. Company B rejoined the battalion at Merkstein.

On 16 November, the 29th Infantry Division began its push toward the Roer River and Jülich. The battalion supported all three infantry regiments of the 29th as they moved east along an axis from Merkstein to Siersdorf to Aldenhoven to Jülich. The advance was marked by sharp engagements in each hamlet and village along the route, with the infantry and tanks having to work closely together to overcome the German defenders dug into the basements and other strongpoints in each town. In addition, the tankers had to be vigilant at night to prevent German infiltrators from moving back into the captured towns during darkness. Now defending their homeland, German resistance was stiff, and it took the 29th Infantry Division a week to cover the ten miles to the western approaches to Jülich. The 747th suffered heavy losses as well, with 18 medium tanks lost to enemy action and 38 men either killed or wounded, and another 3 missing. An additional 19 medium tanks were rendered inoperable due to mechanical failures, leaving only 9 operational medium tanks by 24 November. The battalion was withdrawn to Schleiden for a period of intensive maintenance which they referred to as a "rehabilitation period" until 30 November, at the end of which the 747th could still only count 20 operational medium tanks. Following this, through 11 December, the battalion rotated up to one platoon of tanks at a time, plus the headquarters company assault gun platoon, to assist the 29th Infantry Division in clearing the west bank of the Roer River opposite Jülich. Having reached the Roer, the battalion dug into position overlooking the Roer on 12 December. For the remainder of December 1944, January 1945, and the first week of February, the battalion provided platoons to support the division artillery to provide nighttime indirect harassment and interdiction fires, while the main body of the battalion reinforced their defensive positions and continued combined arms exercises with the infantry.

Although the 29th Infantry Division was a battle-tested veteran unit, having participated in the landings at Omaha Beach, the reduction of Brest, and numerous battles since, they found themselves in a quiet sector of the front during this period. Operation Market Garden, the hard fought battles for Aachen, the Roer River dams, the Hürtgen Forest and even the Battle of the Bulge were nearby but did not directly involve the 29th. As a result, both the division and the 747th Tank Battalion supporting them saw relatively little action from November 1944 until February 1945.

=== Advance into Germany ===
Finally, on 8 February, the tankers began infiltrating forward to attack positions for the crossing of the Roer River. Although the attack was planned for 10 February, it was postponed when the Germans destroyed the discharge valves on the Schwammenauel Dam, causing a steady but long lasting flooding of the Roer River. It wasn't until 23 February that floodwaters receded enough for the attack to finally proceed. In the predawn darkness of 23 February, the tankers provided direct fire support from the west bank of the Roer for the infantry's predawn attack and the Americans seized Jülich by the end of the day. The 29th Infantry Division continued their attack north toward Mönchengladbach, with the tankers supporting the 175th and 115th Infantry Regiments. The Americans encountered similar resistance as they had west of Jülich, having to reduce strongpoints centered on each town along their march route, with German tanks, self-propelled guns and antitank guns located in well-concealed positions to engage the tanks from the flanks. Despite the Germans’ skilled defense, the tankers noted the reduced resistance compared to their attack on Jülich and reached Mönchengladach on 1 March 1945.

After consolidating their positions in Mönchengladbach, the battalion was relieved of attachment to the 29th Infantry Division on 6 March, attached to XVI Corps, and ordered to proceed immediately to Bocket, some 40 km to the southwest, without their tanks. From Bocket they moved to Laak, Holland to draw LVT-2 and LVT-4 amphibious vehicles. At Laak, from 8–18 March 1945, the battalion drew approximately 100 LVT's and went through intensive training with members of the 30th and 79th Infantry Divisions, conducting exercises crossing the Maas River in preparation for an amphibious assault across the Rhine River. Companies A, B, and two platoons of Company C were attached to the 1153rd Engineer Combat Group, which was further attached to the 30th Infantry Division. The remainder of Company C and Company D were attached to the 1148th Engineer Combat Group, which was attached to the 79th Infantry Division.

The LVT's began moving into their assembly areas west of the Rhine on 15 March, with the LVT's of the Company A group moving into positions near Borth and those of the Company C group in the vicinity of Rheinberg and Budberg. The last personnel and equipment closed on 20 March. The tankers moved forward after midnight on 24 March, and by 0330 all companies had begun ferrying the first infantry assault troops across the Rhine. Over the next three days, the 747th made some 1,400 round trip crossings, ferrying men and equipment forward, and casualties and prisoners back. On 26 March, at 2030 the last trip was made, as an engineer bridge had been completed across the Rhine. On 27 March, the 747th turned in their LVT's and closed on Rheydt the same day. On 29 March, they were reattached to the 29th Infantry Division. The tankers returned to their old tanks and after brief but intensive maintenance on vehicles which had not moved in a month, moved to Möllen on 31 March with infantry aboard their vehicles to begin the final assault into Germany.

Companies B and D were attached to the 116th Infantry Regiment, which was itself attached to the 75th Infantry Division as part of the plan to encircle the Ruhr Pocket. By 4 April 1945, they had crossed the Dortmund-Ems Canal and reached Brambauer. On 6 April the tankers took up defensive positions south of the Lippe River at Lünen. The following day Companies B and D returned to battalion control when the 116th Infantry Regiment was released from the 75th Infantry Division.

During this time the rest of the battalion initially remained in assembly areas near Möllen while the rest of the 29th consolidated east of the Rhine. On 3 April, the battalion moved eastward to Marl, then on 6 April the battalion moved some 50 miles east to Sendenhorst, where the 29th went into Ninth Army reserve. The battalion was only there long enough for Company B to rejoin it on 7 April, and on 8 April roadmarched back west to Wulfen (Dorsten), near their positions of 3–6 April. Here, the battalion took up military government responsibilities as part of the 29th Infantry Division until 17 April. Then the 29th was attached to XIII Corps to assist the 5th Armored Division in pushing the corps’ northern flank to the Elbe River, and the 747th Tank Battalion roadmarched 249 mi to Nordhausen, arriving on 18 April. To follow the fast moving 5th Armored, the battalion received orders to immediately proceed to Uetze. However, the battalion had to obtain a 24-hour delay for desperately needed maintenance. The battalion moved out on 20 April, passed through Uetze and arrived at Flettmar with barely one-third of its combat strength due to mechanical breakdowns en route. Even with intensive maintenance day and night over several days, by 26 April the battalion could muster only 37 of 51 medium tanks, and 14 of 17 light tanks. On, the 26th, the battalion made one last move to Schnega, where they once again took up military government duties for the surrounding area. Within their assigned sector, they were responsible for rear area security, patrolling roads and setting up checkpoints, guarding bridges, rounding up displaced persons and released allied prisoners of war, and collecting abandoned and damaged German military equipment until V-E Day on 8 May 1945.

=== Post war ===
The battalion continued its occupation duties after V-E Day, but not long after the cessation of hostilities in Europe the 747th Tank Battalion relocated to Jaderberg, south of the port of Wilhelmshaven. Given its unique experience supporting the Rhine crossing, on 10 July 1945 the battalion was redesignated the 747th Amphibian Tank Battalion, with the intent to deploy the battalion in the Pacific for Operation Downfall, the Allied invasion of Japan. However, with the surrender of Japan in August 1945, deployment to the Pacific was moot. The 747th Amphibian Tank Battalion arrived in New York on 5 March 1946 and was inactivated at Camp Kilmer on 6 March 1946 The battalion was allotted to the Organized Reserves on 27 November 1946 and activated 9 December at Gainesville, Florida.

== Korean War ==
The 747th Amphibian Tank Battalion was mobilized in August 1950 and sent to Fort Worden, Washington. Approximately half of its enlisted personnel were then reassigned to the newly organized 89th Engineer Port Construction Company. While at Fort Worden, on 20 November 1950, it was reconstituted as a composite amphibious tank and tractor battalion and redesignated the 747th Amphibious Tank and Tractor Battalion and equipped with LVT-4 amphibious tractors and LVT-5 amphibious tanks. That same month, the battalion relocated to Camp Cooke, where it conducted amphibious exercises and gunnery training.

The 747th participated in PHIBTEST, the largest amphibious training exercise conducted during the Korean War, at Coronado, California from June to October 1952. On 5 January 1953, the 747th relocated to Fort Ord, California, when Camp Cooke was transferred to the Air Force and renamed Vandenberg Air Force Base.

After the move to Fort Ord, the battalion began to return to a reserve status and was relieved from active duty in September 1953. The 747th Tank Battalion was inactivated on 31 January 1954 and allotted to the Army Reserve.

== 723rd Tank Battalion and Operation Teapot ==
The battalion was inactive for only a short time, but when reactivated bore a new number. On 7 October 1954, the battalion was redesignated as the 723rd Tank Battalion and allotted to the Regular Army and assigned to the 71st Infantry Division and activated at Camp Irwin, California.

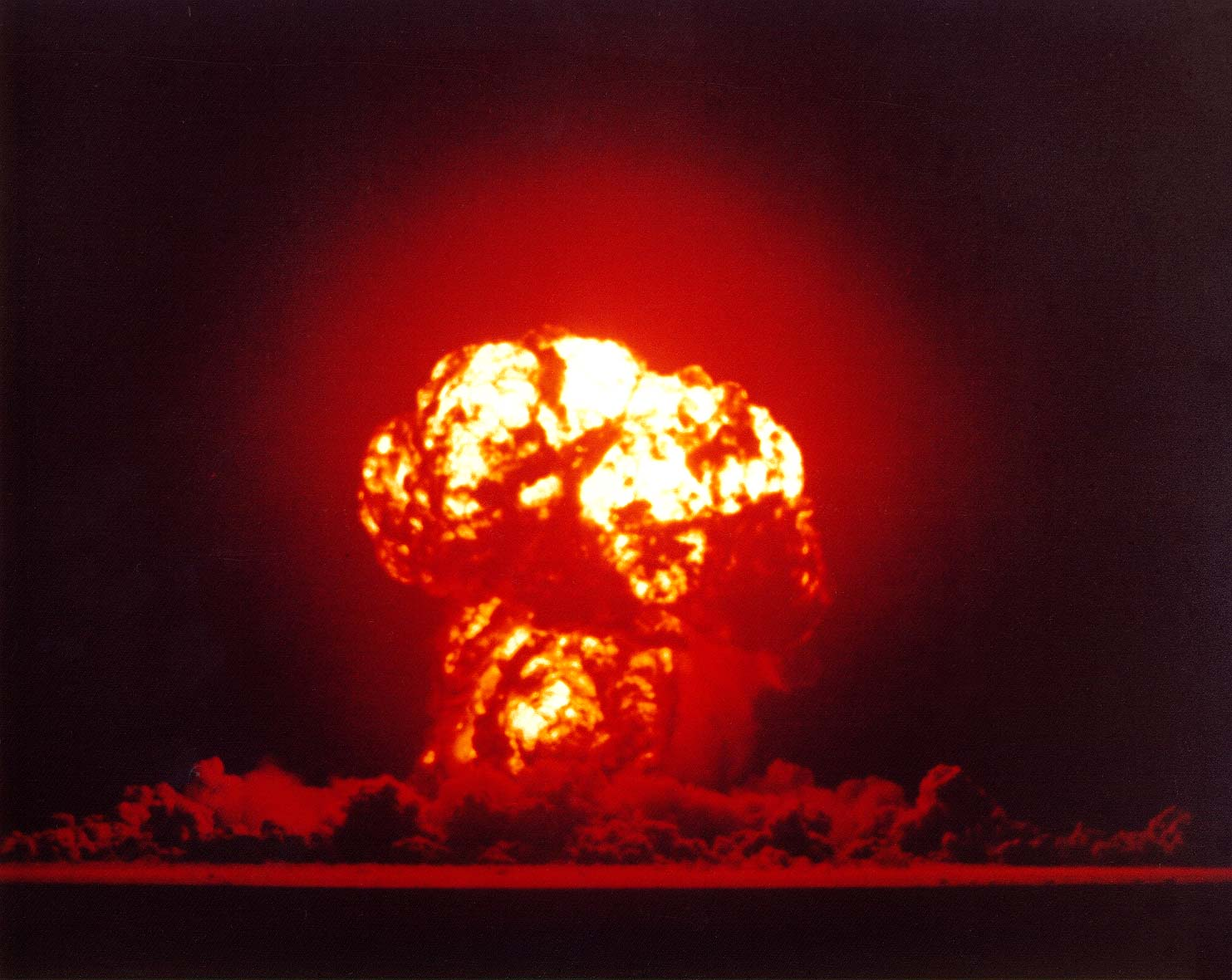
Shot Apple-2, where the 723rd Tank Battalion participated in a tactical maneuver test as part of the nuclear test

The 723rd was used as the core unit of an atomic test in the Operation Teapot series of nuclear test explosions at the Nevada Test Site (NTS). In a project sponsored by the United States Army Armor School, the test was designed to demonstrate the capability of a reinforced tank battalion (Task Force RAZOR) to conduct offensive operations immediately after and in the immediate vicinity of a nuclear attack. The battalion, reinforced with armored infantry, field artillery and engineer units from the 4th Armored Division at Fort Hood, Texas, assembled at Camp Irwin between 9–13 March 1955 and began training together in preparation for the test. On 18 April, Task Force RAZOR conducted a 250 km tactical march from Camp Irwin to the NTS, arriving on 21 April 1955. Upon arriving, the units rehearsed their maneuver in the test area. They set up in assembly areas in Yucca Flats three times to prepare for the test, but the test was postponed due to bad weather each time. Finally, on 4 May, Shot APPLE-2 was fired at 0510. The task force vehicles were positioned from 3 to 5 kilometers from ground zero. There was no significant damage to the vehicles, and the task force began moving 8 minutes after the shot. When the tanks closest to ground zero reached a reading inside the vehicle of 1 R/h, they turned away from ground zero and proceeded to their objective about 6.4 km from their original positions. Upon completion of the test, the 723rd and its attached elements departed the NTS and marched overland back to Camp Irwin, arriving on 9 May. At Camp Irwin they conducted a chemical warfare exercise before the task force was dissolved.

The 723rd was inactivated along with the rest of the 71st Infantry Division on 15 September 1956.

== Unit awards and decorations ==
- French Croix de Guerre: 6 June 1944, Department of the Army General Order 43-50, Attached to 29th Infantry Division.
- Occupation Duty – Germany: 2 May-4 Sep 1945.

== Notes ==
Citations
