= Cerisy Forest =

Woodland in France

- Forêt de Cerisy
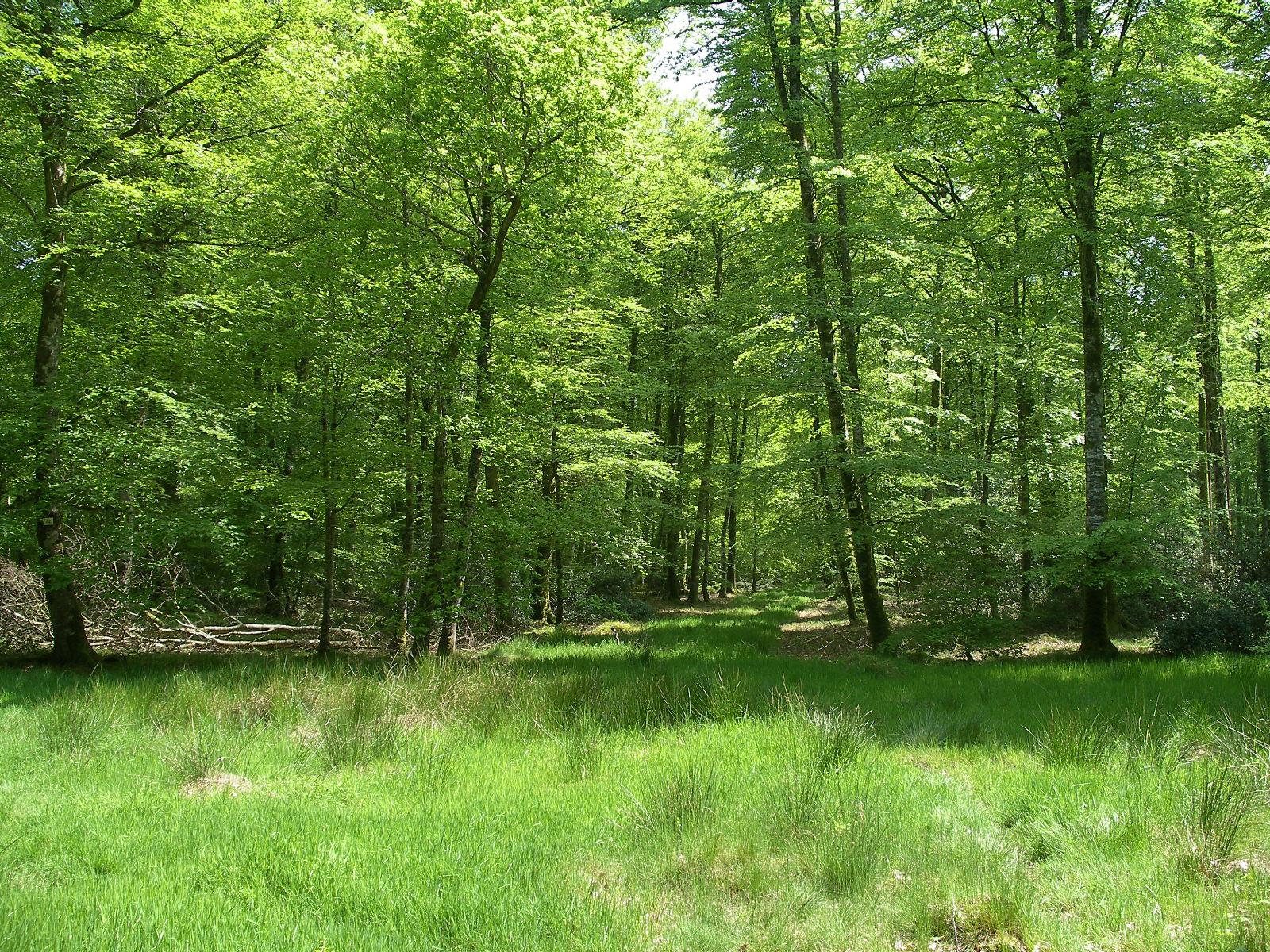
- Pathway in the forest

- Location within France
- Location: Cerisy-la-Forêt, Montfiquet, France
- Coordinates: 49°11′00″N 0°53′30″W
- Area: 2,127 hectares (5,260 acres)

Cerisy Forest (forêt de Cerisy or forêt de Balleroy) is a 2,127-hectare (5,260-acre) beech woodland (75% of the land), located in the French Calvados and Manche departments.

Since 1976 it has been a national nature reserve managed by the National Forests Office. Its goals include conservation of an endemic golden sub-species of carabus auronitens, which is protected at national level.

== Fauna ==
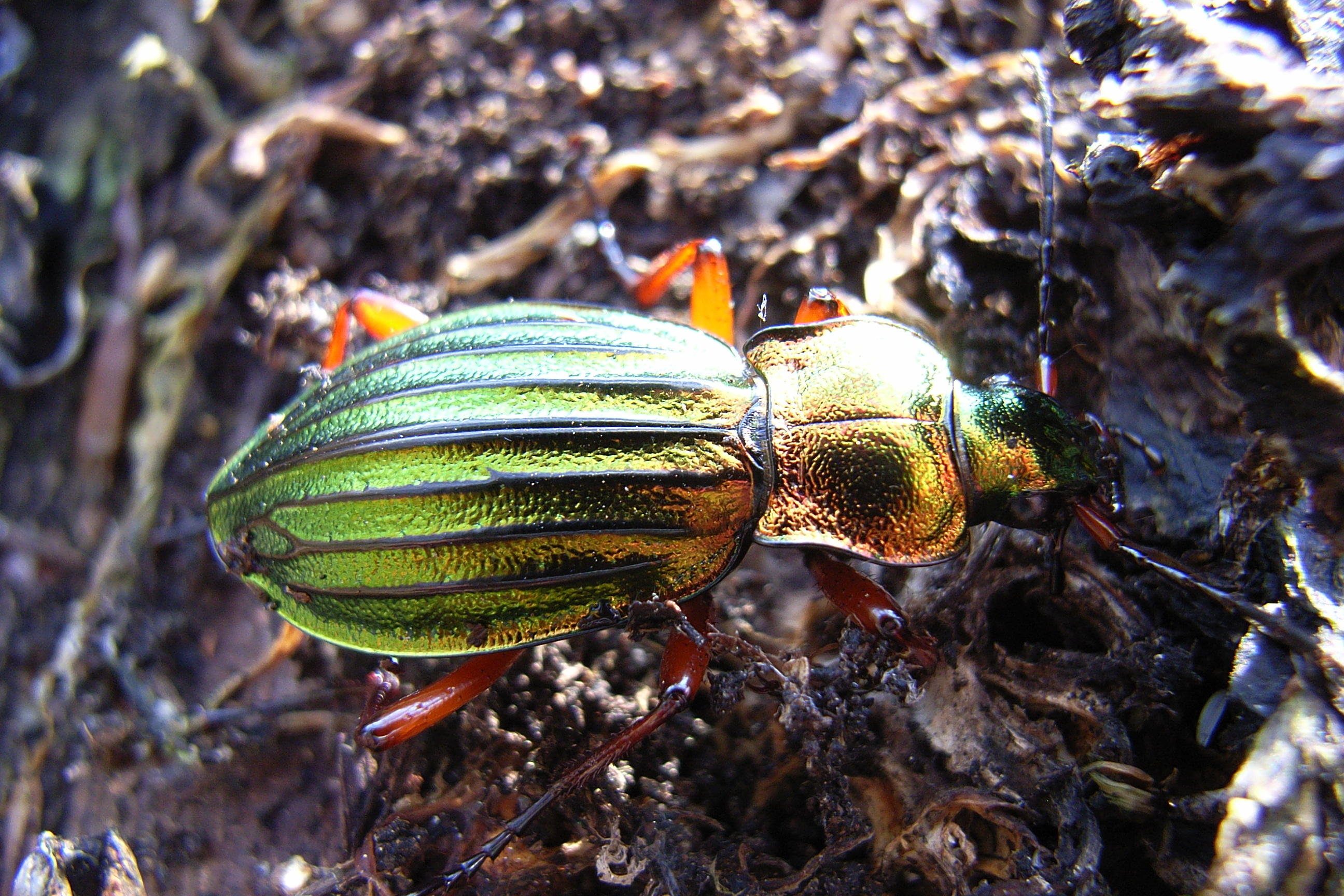
C. auronitens

Fauna in the woodland includes roe deer, boars, badgers and foxes.

Bird species include black woodpecker, middle spotted woodpecker and long-eared owl. Amphibians and insects include the golden carabus auronitens (Chrysocarabus auronitens ssp cupreonitens), Alpine newt, palmate newt, agile frog and salamanders. There are also butterflies and reptiles including the adder and common lizard.

== Flora ==
Cerisy Forest is made up 75% of beech, 12% oak and 3% Scots pine. Other trees and shrubs include birch, chestnut, black alder, holly, knee holm, walnut. Plant species include wood spurge, foxglove and thimbleweed.

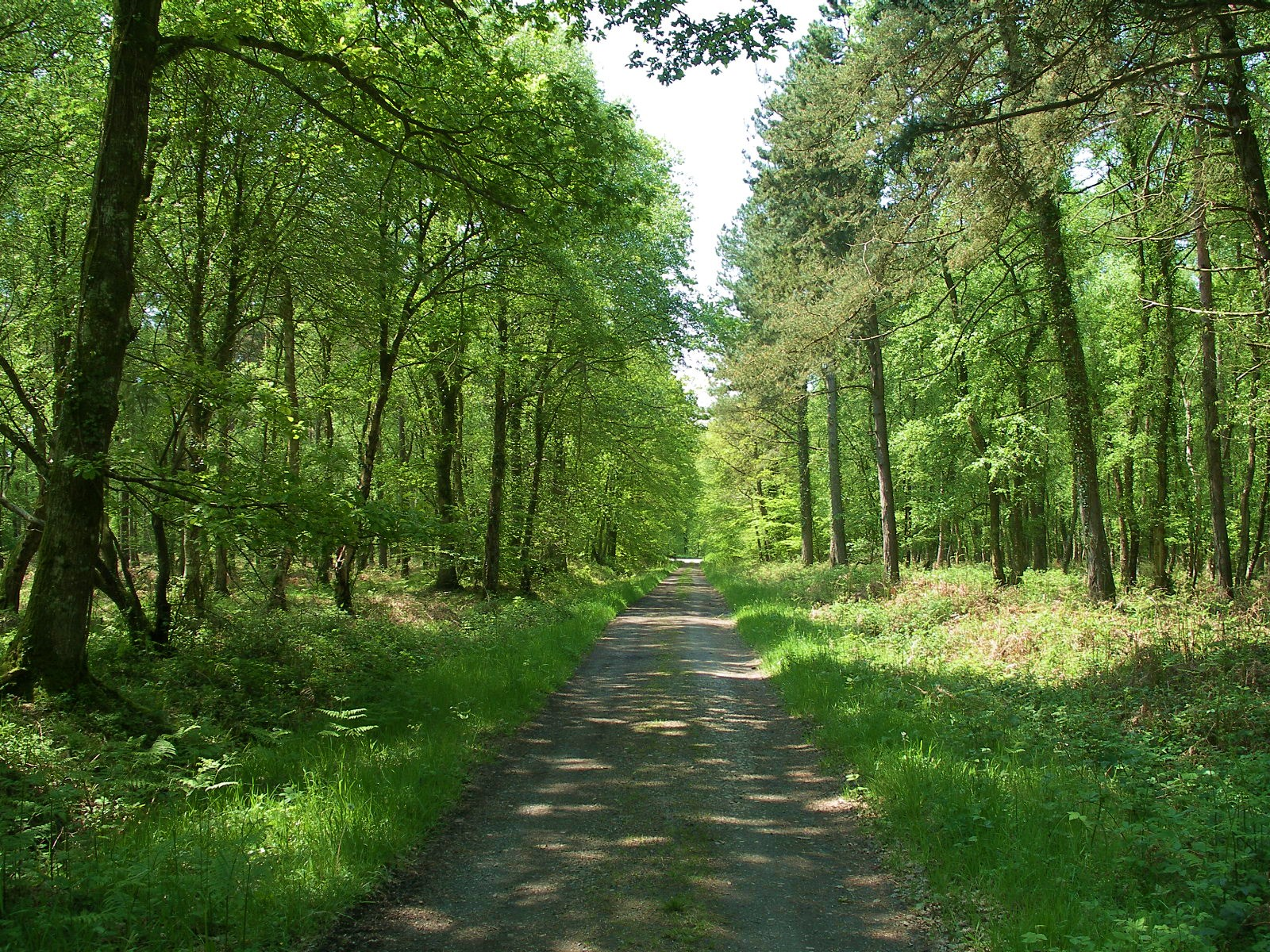
Chênesse forest road

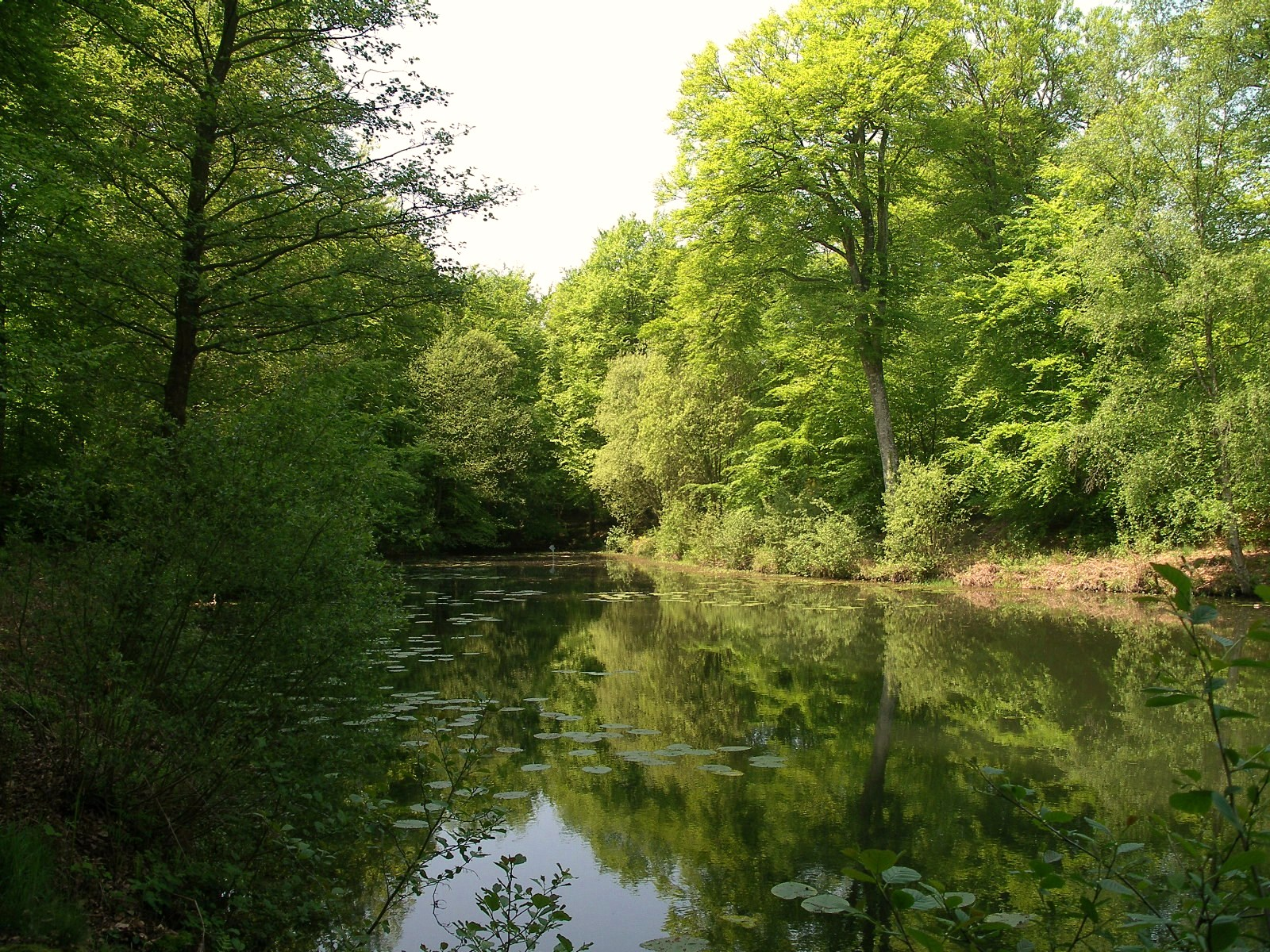
Titre pond

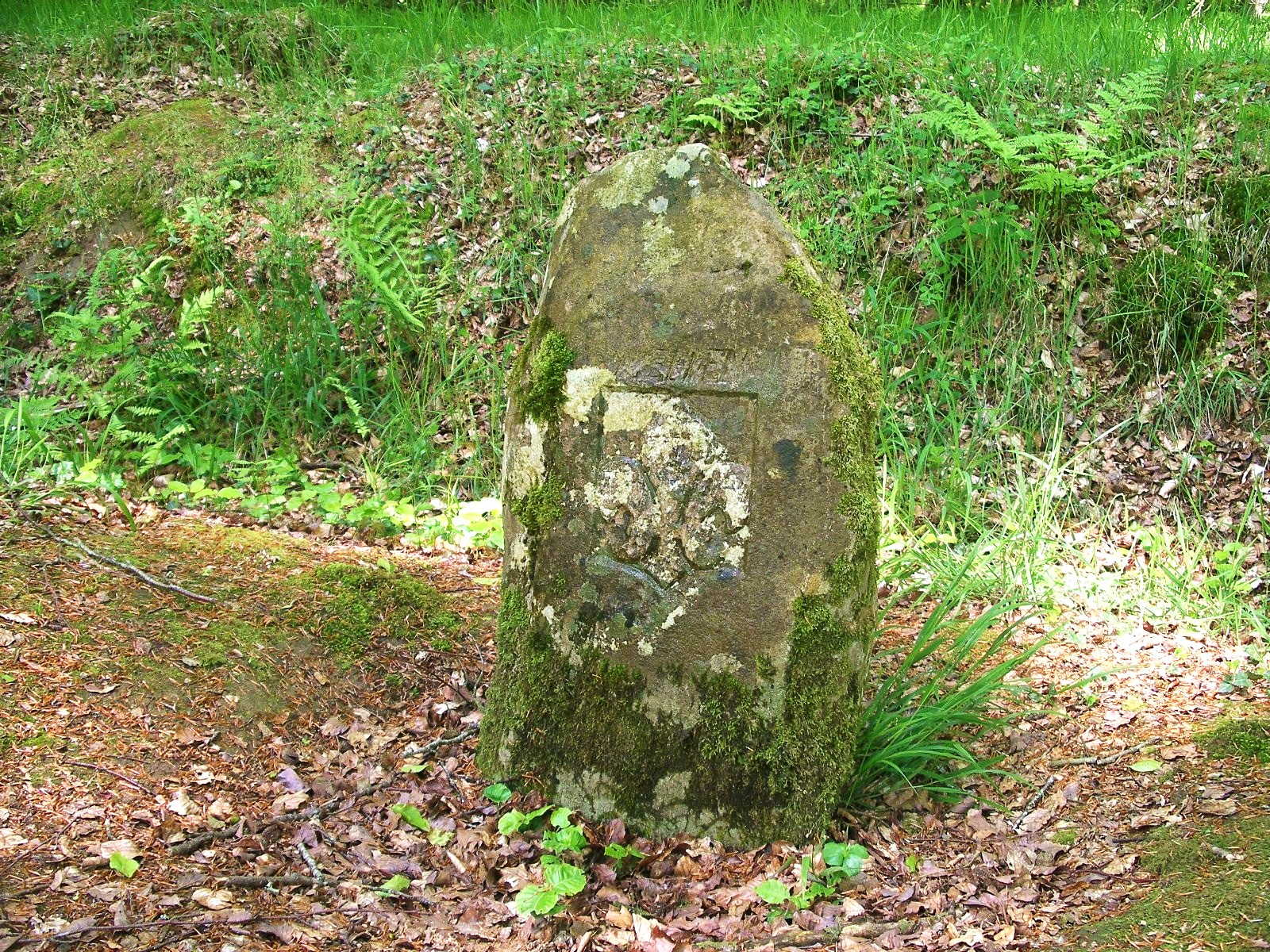
Royal milestone

=== Surroundings ===
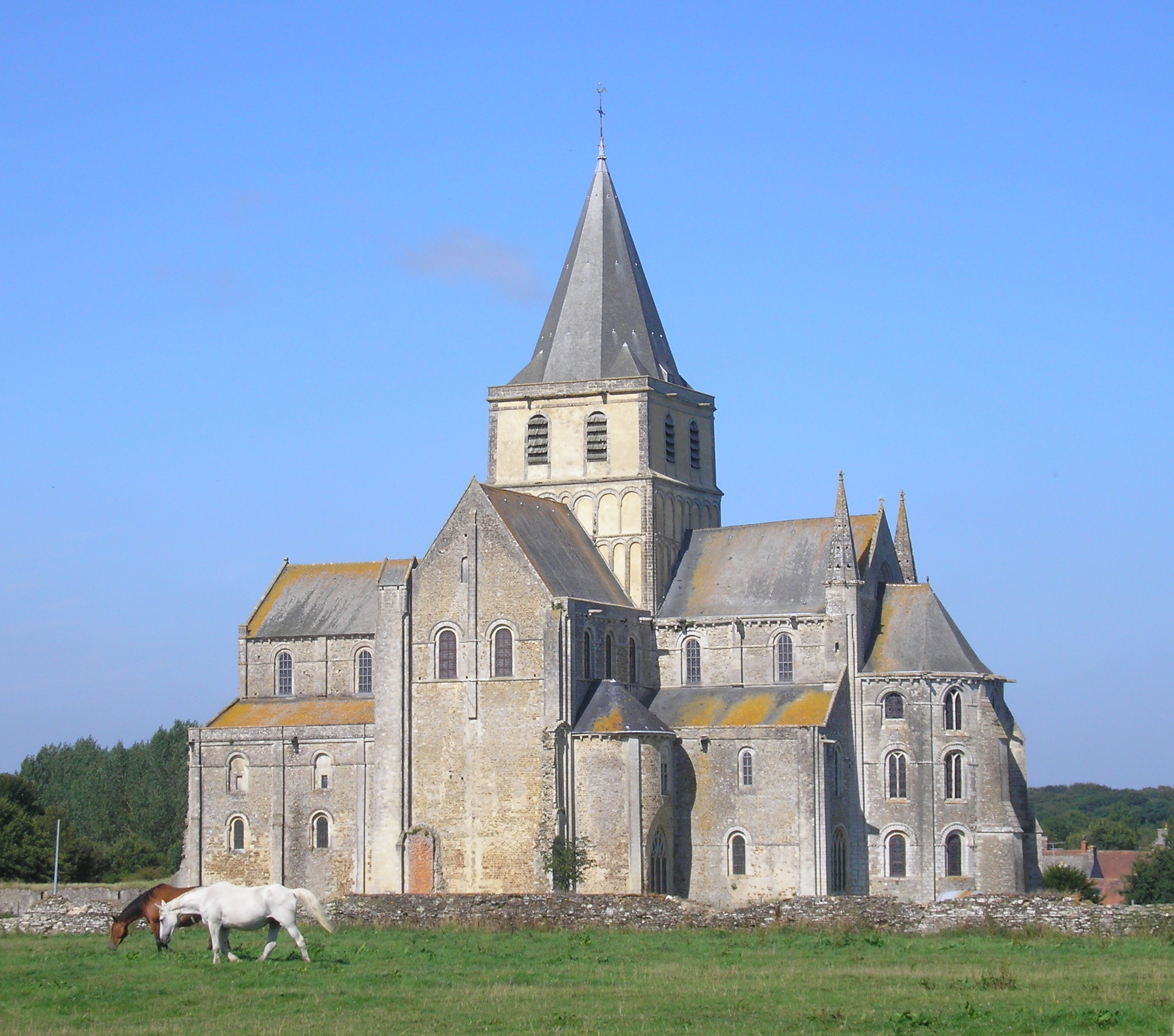
Cerisy abbey

- Cerisy-la-Forêt is a village to the west of the forest. Its 11th century abbey was built on the site of a priory founded in 510 by Saint Vigor, bishop of Bayeux. it is a Benedictine monastery.
- Le Molay-Littry is a town north of the forest. It hosted the only coal mine in Normandy, of which a museum now stands.
- Balleroy is a village south of the forest. Balleroy Castle (designed by François Mansart) was built from 1626 to 1636.

=== Other sites ===
- La maison de la Forêt et du Tourisme (expositions sur la faune et flore en forêt de Cerisy, métiers liés au bois, animations pour groupes et individuels).
- Le moulin de Marcy au Molay-Littry.
- Les jardins de Castillon.
- Les étangs de Planquery.
- Le jardin d'Elle à Villiers-Fossard.
- Le parc des Sources d'Elle.
