= Elle (river) =

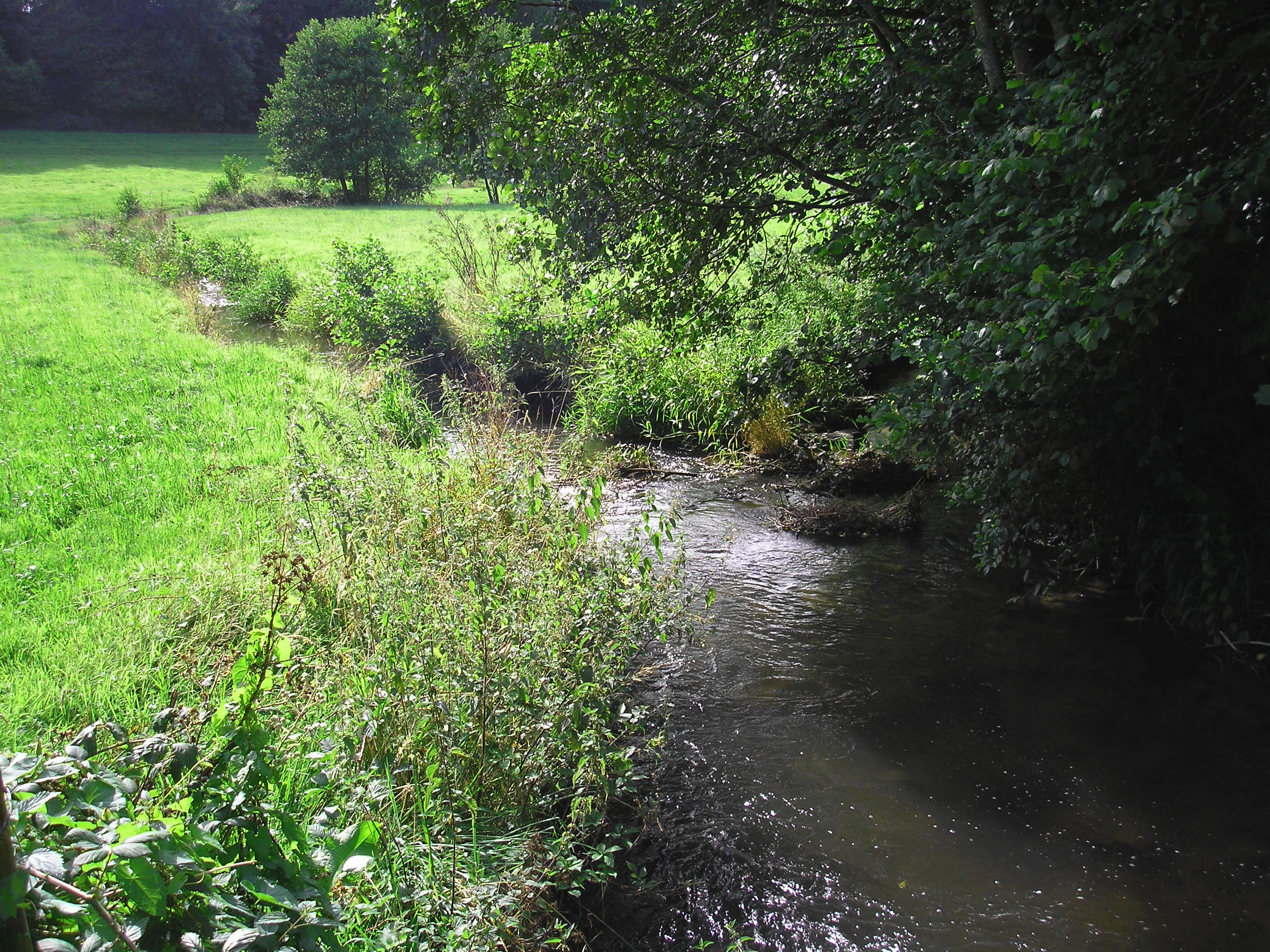
- Elle at Saint-Jean-de-Savigny

- Location within France Location within Normandy

Location
- Country: France
- Region: Normandy

Physical characteristics
- Source
  - location: Les Navignes, Rouxeville
  - coordinates: 49.1045°N 0.9404°W
  - elevation: 165 m (541 ft)
- Mouth
  - location: Vire, Neuilly-la-Forêt
  - coordinates: 49.2764°N 1.1223°W
  - elevation: 1 m (3.3 ft)
- Length: 31.8 km (19.8 mi)
- Basin size: 129 km^{2} (50 sq mi)
- Discharge
  - average: 0.628 m^{3}/s (22.2 cu ft/s) (Saint-Jean-de-Savigny)

Basin features
- Progression: Vire→ English Channel
- Tributaries
  - right: Rieu

The Elle (French pronunciation: [ɛl]) is a 31.8 km long river in Normandy, a right bank affluent of the Vire.

== Topography ==
It crops north of Rouxeville. It joins the Vire at Neuilly-la-Forêt in the Marais du Cotentin et du Bessin between Bessin and Pays saint-lois.

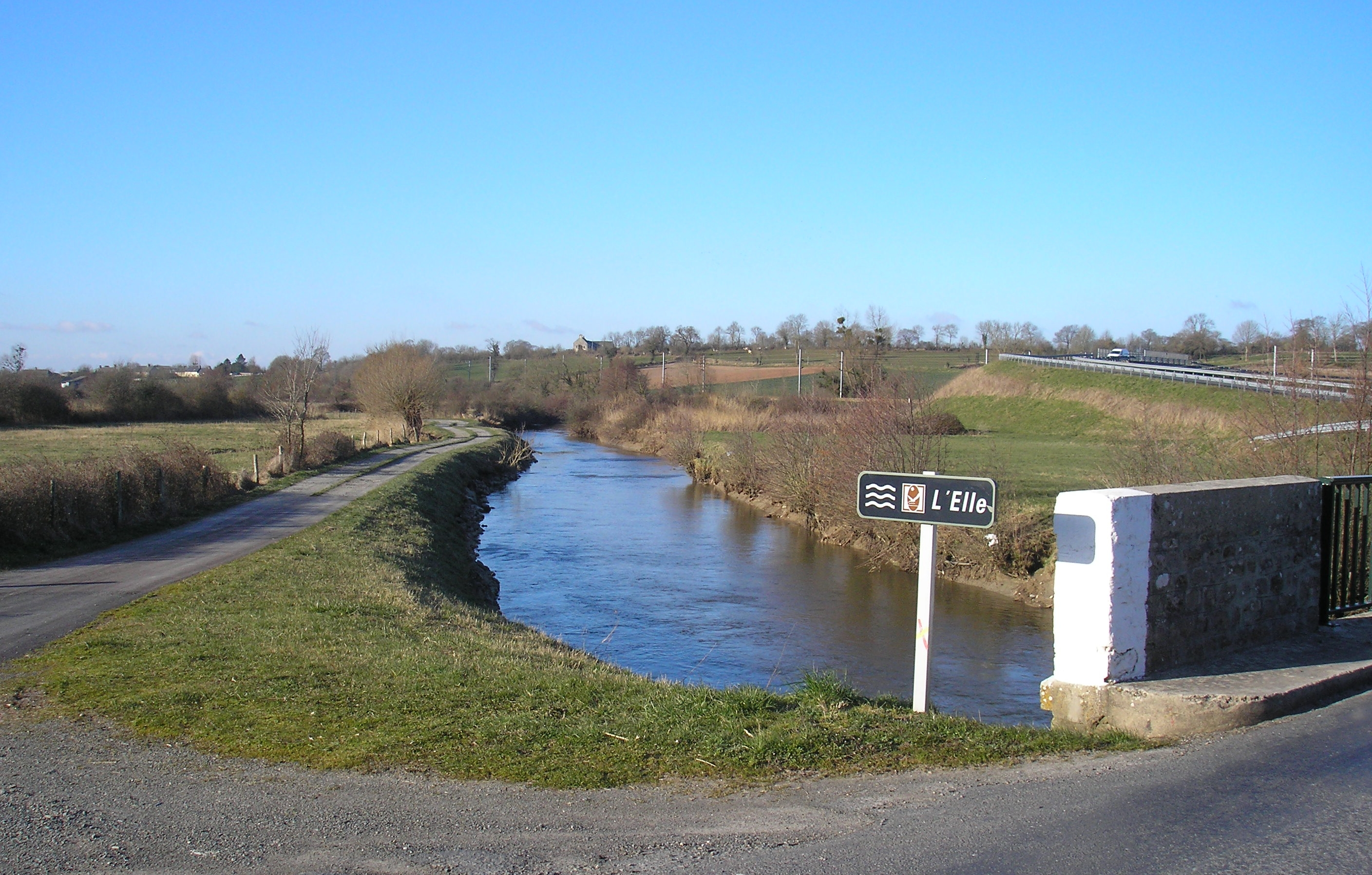
Elle at Neuilly-la-Forêt

== Tributaries ==
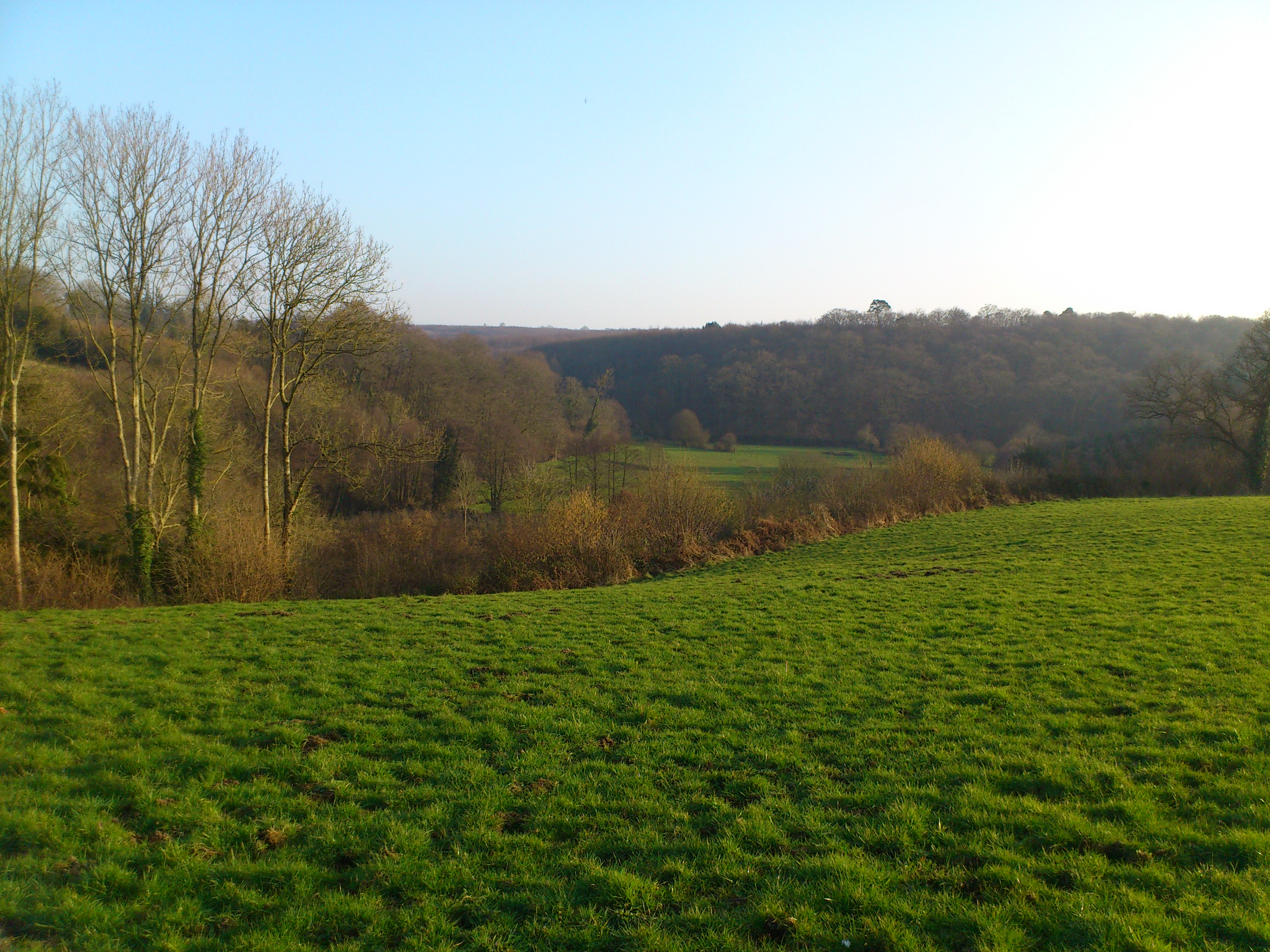
Vallée de l'Elle à Cerisy-la-Forêt

L'Elle has several affluents ~ among them:

- one main affluent : the Rieu (12.2 km) which joins right bank at Lison. The Rieu collects the waters of the north-eastern part of the basin, located between those of the Aure (north) and the Vire (east) and a few of its tributaries to the south and the east.
- le ruisseau de Branche (6.7 km) joins the Elle left bank at Saint-Jean-de-Savigny.

== Communes ==
- Rouxeville (spring source at 200 m),
- Saint-Germain-d'Elle,
- Bérigny, où se joignent des ramifications secondaires venant de Saint-Jean-des-Baisants et Notre-Dame-d'Elle,
- Saint-Georges-d'Elle (en limite est),
- Montfiquet (en limite ouest),
- Cerisy-la-Forêt,
- Sainte-Marguerite-d'Elle (en limite sud),
- Saint-Jean-de-Savigny (en limite nord),
- Saint-Clair-sur-l'Elle (en limite nord),
- Moon-sur-Elle,
- Airel,
- Lison (en limite ouest),
- Neuilly-la-Forêt (confluent avec la Vire),
