= Cerisy Abbey =

Abbey in Manche, France

Coordinates: 49.1972°N 0.9332°W

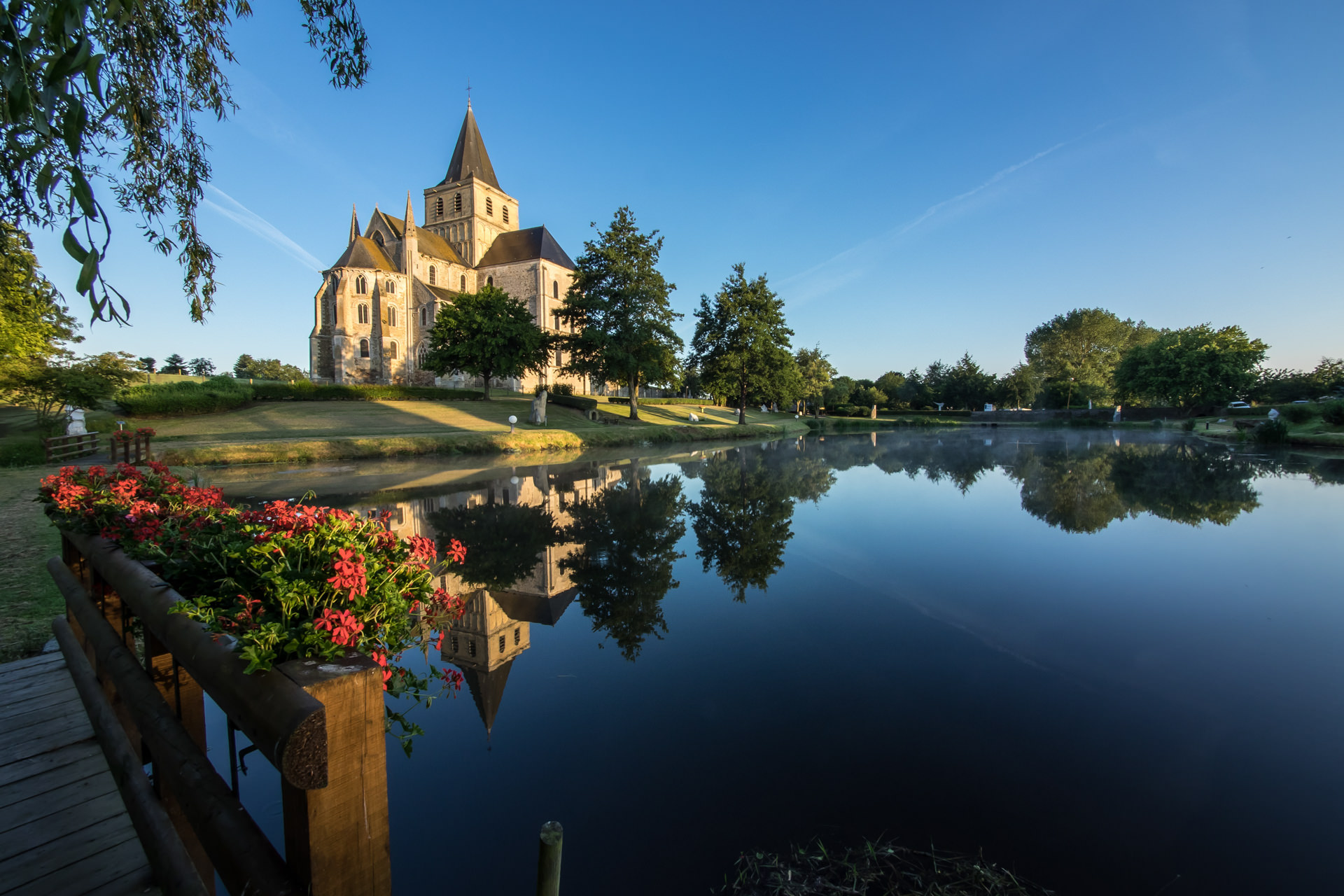
Cerisy Abbey

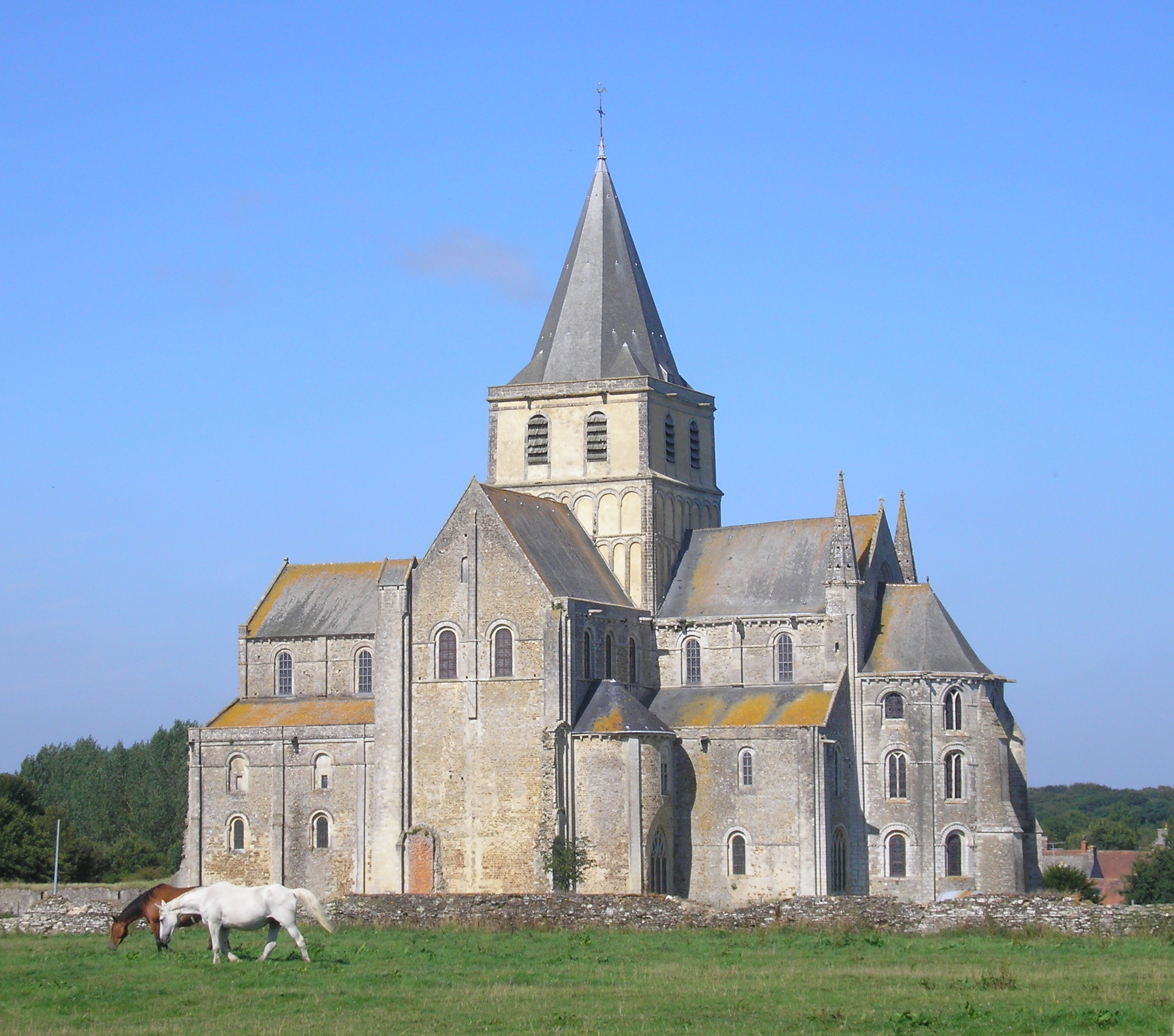
Cerisy Abbey in 2009

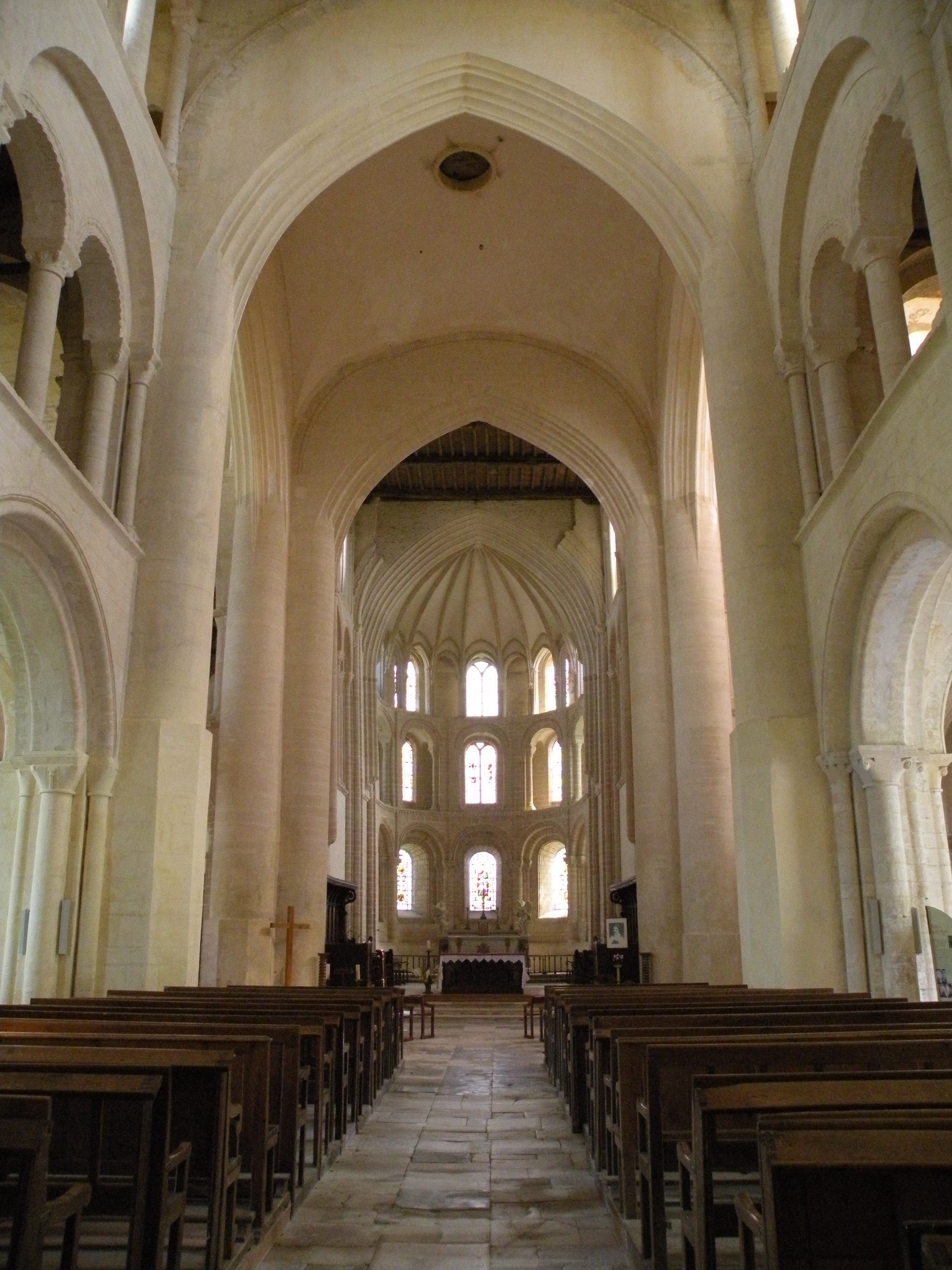
Interior of the abbey church in 2015

Cerisy Abbey, otherwise the Abbey of Saint Vigor (French: Abbaye de Cerisy, Abbaye Saint-Vigor de Cerisy), located in Cerisy-la-Forêt (near Saint-Lô), Manche, France, was an important Benedictine monastery of Normandy.

== History ==
The abbey was founded in 1032 by the Duke of Normandy Robert the Magnificent on the site of an older monastery destroyed by the Normans during their invasion. It was dedicated to Saint Vigor. It benefited from considerable donations and favors. The abbey became an important economic and intellectual center, welcoming several kings of France several times and counting several intellectuals among its members. It also had a large number of outbuildings in the form of monastic granges which contributed to ensure a colossal income. It bore the title of "royal abbey" (under the protection of the King of France).

In the 12th century, Cerisy extended its powers over the former Merovingian abbeys of Deux-Jumeaux and Saint-Fromond and founded priories at Saint-Marcouf, Barnavast and Vauville. At that time, a common devotion to the cause of the Roman Church united the Normans of England, France, Southern Italy, and Greece. Everywhere, their military effectiveness was asserted, as well as their talent for construction. In 1178, Pope Alexander III confirmed with a special bull the privileges of the abbey of Cerisy, which reached the height of its glory during the end of the 12th century.

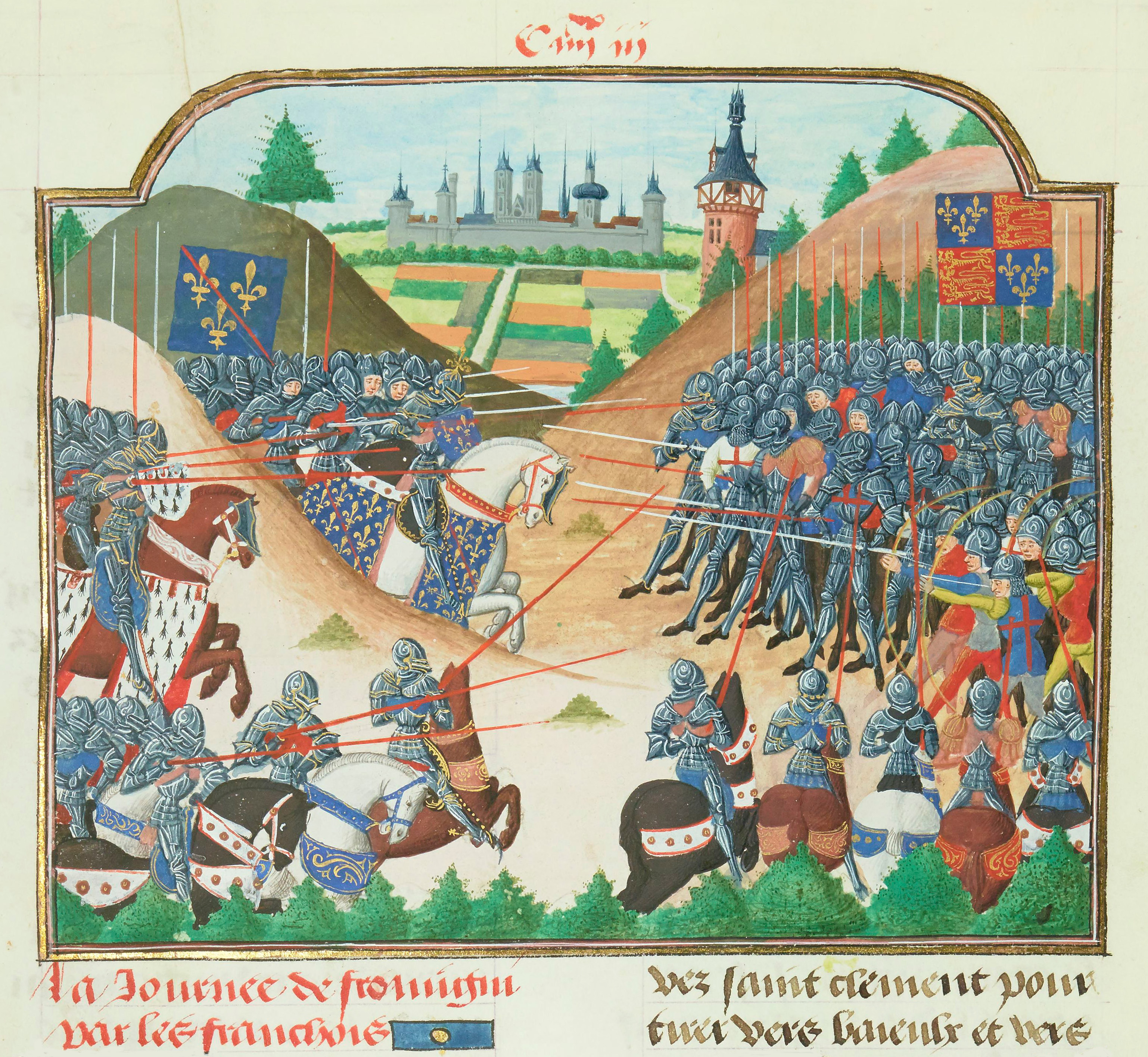
The battle of Formigny

Cerisy became an important market town at this time. The abbey eventually consisted of forty-eight parishes and eight priories, including two in England (at Monk Sherborne and Peterborough). Depending on the Holy See, Cerisy maintained close relations with the monasteries of Mont-Saint-Michel, Saint-Ouen, Jumièges, Bec-Hellouin, Fécamp and of course Caen.

In 1337, the dynastic rivalries between the Valois and the kings of England precipitated the country into the Hundred Years War, which plunged the country into misery, aggravated by epidemics of plague. The abbey was fortified and a garrison settled there. In 1418, Richard de Silly, knight and captain of the abbey, was obliged to cede the abbey to the King of England. However, after the victory of the constable de Richemont over the English at Formigny in 1450, Normandy returned definitively to the kingdom of France.

Following the Concordat of Bologna in 1516, the abbey was placed in commendam, lall the abbeys in the kingdom; this meant that the abbot was no longer named by the community of monks, that he might be a layman, and obtained the profits of the abbey's income, while the spiritual power was entrusted to a prior. Its administration was sometimes entrusted to a person appointed outside the community. This is the end of his independence. The abbey declined until the death of the last commendatory abbot, Paul d'Albert de Luynes, archbishop of Sens, in 1788.

After a period of decline at the end of the Middle Ages, the abbey underwent a period of artistic renaissance with the Congregation of Saint-Maur in 1716. In the 18th century, new agricultural buildings were built. The monks left it in the French Revolution, and the abbey became the unique parish church of the village of Cerisy-la-Forêt in 1790. Following its sale as national property during the Revolution most monastic buildings were sold to a contractor who demolished them and then sold the stones for the construction of roads and houses. The land was also sold at this time. Thereafter, what remained of the conventual buildings (including the chapel of St. Gerbold) was sold to the abbey's farm, which enabled them to be saved.

== Heritage Listing ==
The abbey church is classified as historic monuments by the list of 1840 while the rest of the abbey is classified in 1938.

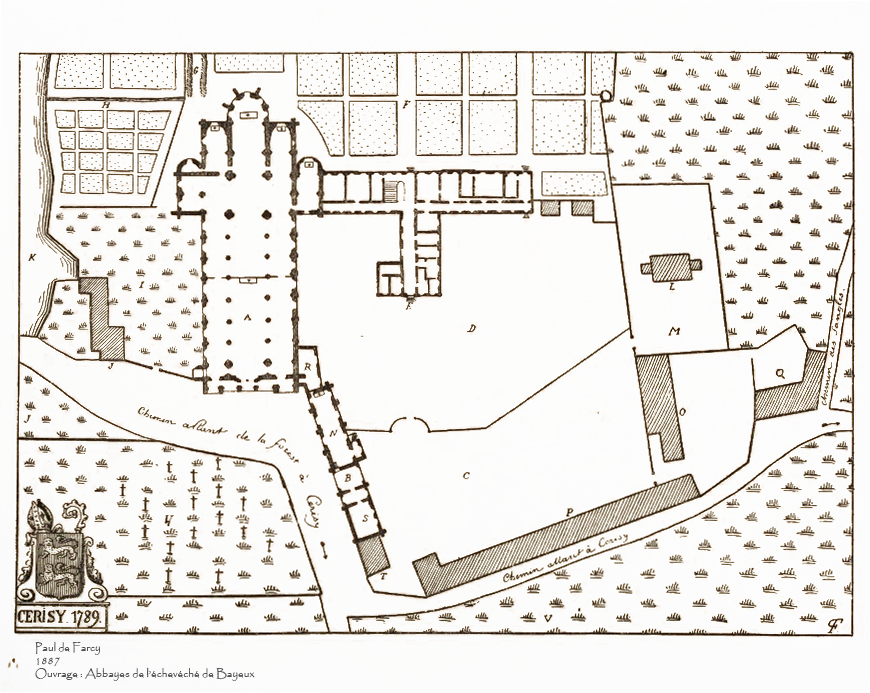
Plan of the Abbey, by Paul de Farcy - 1887.

== Abbots ==
- Durand 1030–1032, monk of Saint-Ouen
- Almodus 1032–1033
- Garin 1033–1066
- Hugues I 1066–1117
- Hugues II 1117–1167
- Martin 1167–1190
- Robert 1190–1198
- Bertrand 1198–1210
- Jean I 1210–1220
- Thomas I 1220–1223
- Robert I 1223–1232
- Nicolas I 1233–1234
- Radulphe ~1239
- Pierre I ~1239
- Hugues III ~1240
- Nicolas II ~1243
- Osmond 1249–1251
- Laurent I 1252–1276
- Guillaume de Saint-Gabriel 1276–1284
- Thomas de Saonnet 1284–1286
- Benoist 1290–1292
- Thomas III 1292–1297
- Robert II 1297–1307
- Noël I 1339
- Robert III 1340–1346
- Jean II 1360–1385
- Estold d'Estouteville 1385–1388
- Simon du Bosc 1388–1391
- Robert IV 1392–1393
- Jean III 1397
- Thomas du Bourg 1399–1427
- Jean IV 1429–1432
- Noël Sabine 1436–1446
- Richard Sabine 1446–1472, built the cloister in 1470
- Laurent Le Clerc 1472–1499
- Claude de Husson 1502–1509, Bishop of Poitiers
- Jacques de Silly 1509–1539
- Georges d'Amboise 1539–1550, Bishop of Rouen
- Charles de Bourbon 1550–1557
- Antoine d'Apchon 1557–1580, Bishop of Tarbes
- Alexandre de la Guesle 1580
- Jean V 1581
- François de la Guesle 1584–1614, Archbishop of Tours
- Pierre Habert 1614–1630
- Henri-Louis Habert de Montmort 1631–1637
- Germain Habert 1637–1654, member of the Académie française
- Jules Mazarin 1654–1661, cardinal
- Philippe de Vendôme 1661–1727, Grand Prior for France
- Paul d'Albert de Luynes 1727–1788, Bishop of Bayeux, Bishop of Sens, and cardinal

== See also ==
- French Romanesque architecture
