= Saint-Clair-sur-l'Elle =

- Commune
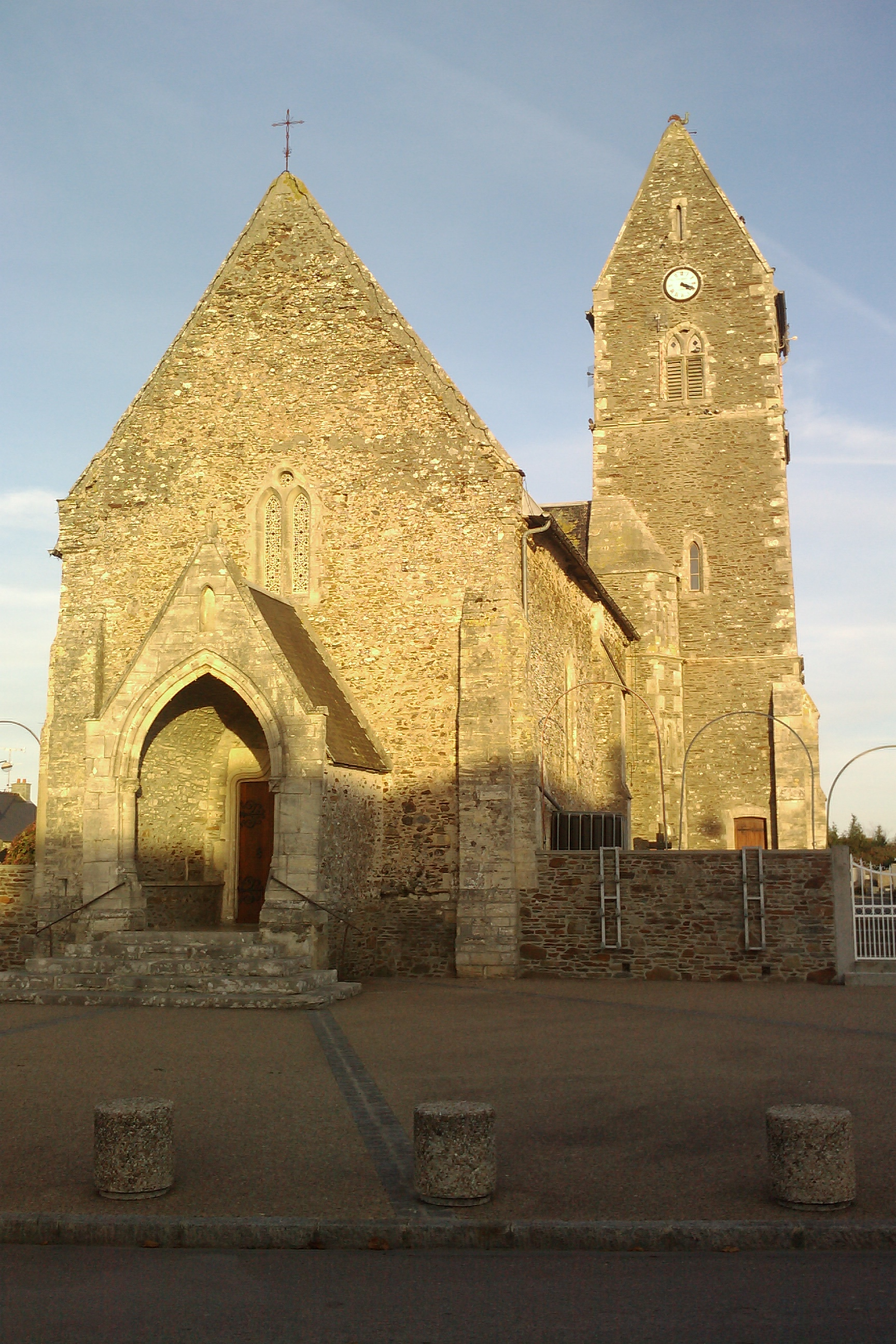
- The church of Saint-Clair
- Location of Saint-Clair-sur-l'Elle
- Location within France Location within Normandy
- Coordinates: 49°11′35″N 1°01′42″W
- Country: France
- Region: Normandy
- Department: Manche
- Arrondissement: Saint-Lô
- Canton: Pont-Hébert
- Intercommunality: Saint-Lô Agglo

Government
  - Mayor (2020–2026): Maryvonne Raimbeault
- Area^{1}: 7.99 km^{2} (3.08 sq mi)
- Elevation: 55 m (180 ft)
- Highest elevation: 95 m (312 ft)
- Lowest elevation: 12 m (39 ft)
- Population (2023): 959
  - Density: 120/km^{2} (311/sq mi)
- Time zone: UTC+01:00 (CET)
  - Summer (DST): UTC+02:00 (CEST)
- INSEE/Postal code: 50455 /50680
- ^{1} French Land Register data, which excludes lakes, ponds, glaciers > 1 km^{2} (0.386 sq mi or 247 acres) and river estuaries.

Saint-Clair-sur-l'Elle (French pronunciation: [sɛ̃ klɛːʁ syʁ lɛl]; literally 'Saint Clair on the Elle') is a commune in the Manche department in Normandy in north-western France.

== See also ==
- Communes of the Manche department
