= Simon du Bosc =

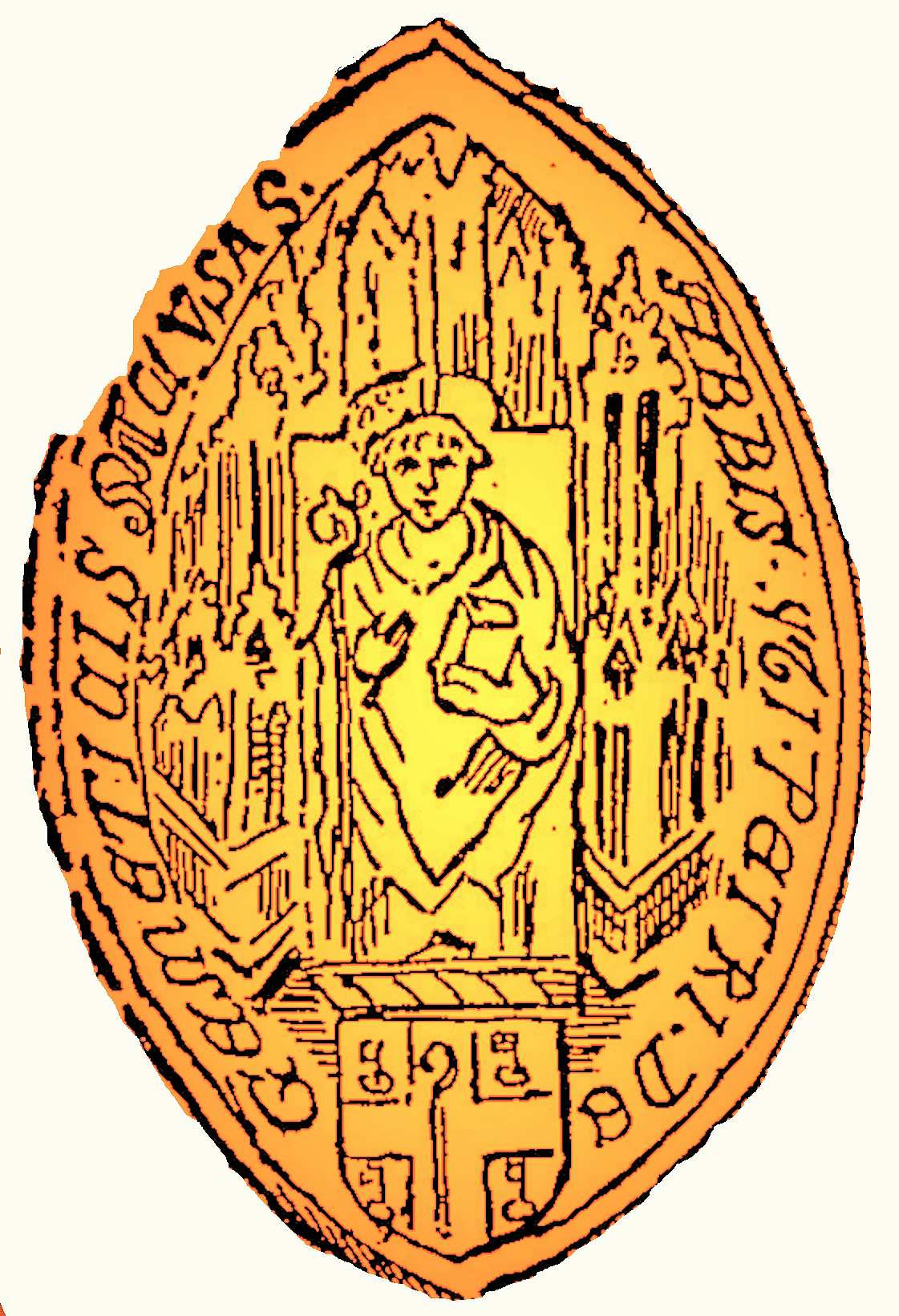
Seal of Jumièges Abbey

Simon du Bosc (died 14 September 1418) was a French religious, abbot of Cerisy Abbey and then 58th abbot of Jumièges Abbey from 1391 to his death. He attended several councils where he was distinguished by his eloquence and the uprightness of his judgment.

== Biography ==
Originally from an old family of Rouen, he was son of Mathieu du Bosc, and was a doctor in canon law. He became successively prior of Sigy-en-Bray, abbot of Cerisy, chamberlain of the pope, and finally abbot of Jumièges.

In 1407 King Charles VI appointed him one of the ambassadors who negotiated the interview of Savona between Popes Benedict XIII and Gregory XII, in order to put an end to the Great Western Schism, which failed. He participated as ambassador of the king and deputy of the University of Paris at the Council of Pisa in 1409, which attempted in vain to resolve the crisis by electing a third pope, Alexander V. Nevertheless, he received from the new pope the right to use the mitre, the ring and the pontifical ornaments of the abbots of Jumièges.

Simon du Bosc was an active participant in the Council of Constance (1414-1418). He preached several times against the practice of the Eucharist advocated by John Hus and distinguished himself by his zeal for the unity of the Church and the struggle against heresies. The council managed to resolve the crisis in 1417 after the deposition of the popes of Pisa and Avignon and the resignation of that of Rome, Gregory XII.

Simon died in Paris on 14 September 1418 while the war between the Kings of France and England was ravaging Normandy. In the year of his death, the abbey of Jumièges was sacked by the English and the monks had to take refuge in Rouen. He was succeeded by Nicolas Le Roux.
