= Estold d'Estouteville =

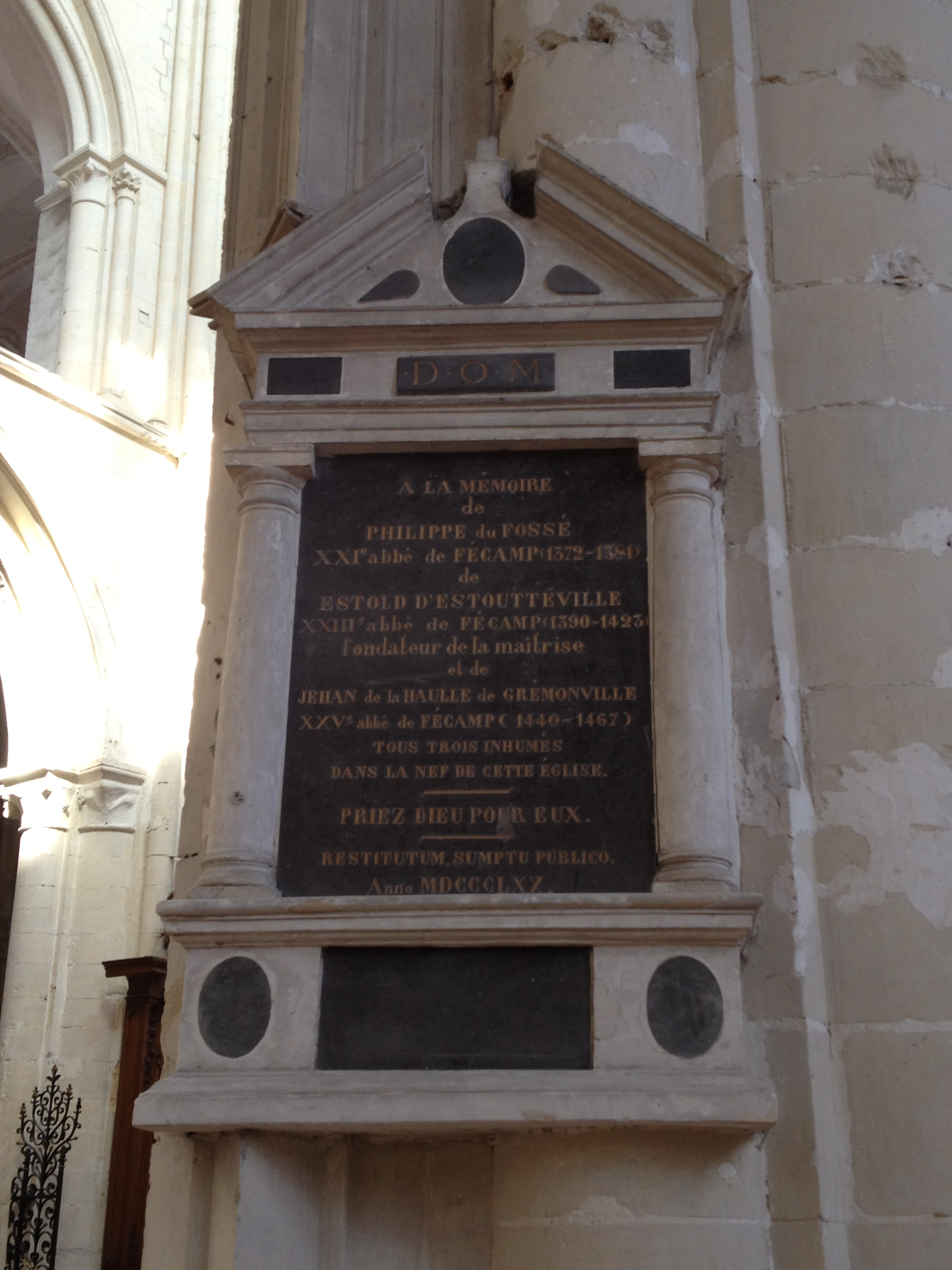
Memorial of three abbots including Estold in the church of Fécamp Abbey

Arms of the Estouteville family

Estold or Estout d'Estouteville (died 13 October 1423) was successively abbot of Cerisy Abbey, Bec Abbey and Fécamp Abbey in Normandy, France.

== Family ==
He was the son of Jean d'Estouteville (died 1356), lord of Torcy and Estoutemont, and his wife Jeanne de Fiennes. His uncle was Robert de Fiennes, constable of France. His brothers were Thomas d'Estouteville (died 1394), bishop of Beauvais, and Guillaume d'Estouteville (died 1414), bishop of Evreux, Lisieux and Auxerre. He was of the same family as Cardinal Guillaume d'Estouteville.

== Biography ==
Estold was a monk of Fécamp, and a doctor of canon law. He was abbot of Cerisy from 1385 to 1388. In that year he became abbot of Bec, an office he resigned in 1391. He was the 23rd abbot of Fécamp from 1390 to 1423.

He took the oath of fidelity to King Charles VI on 23 June 1392 at Saint-Germain-en-Laye. He appointed a deputy to represent him at the Council of Pisa of 1409 which elected the antipope Alexander V.

When King Henry V of England took Fécamp, during the Hundred Years' War, Estold refused to take the oath of loyalty to him, but retired to his castle at Fontaine-le-Bourg. The property of Fécamp Abbey situate in England was then confiscated and re-granted by charter to Thomas Langley, Bishop of Durham.

He died on 13 October 1423 and is buried in the nave of the abbey church of Fécamp.
