= Saint-Georges-d'Elle =

- Commune
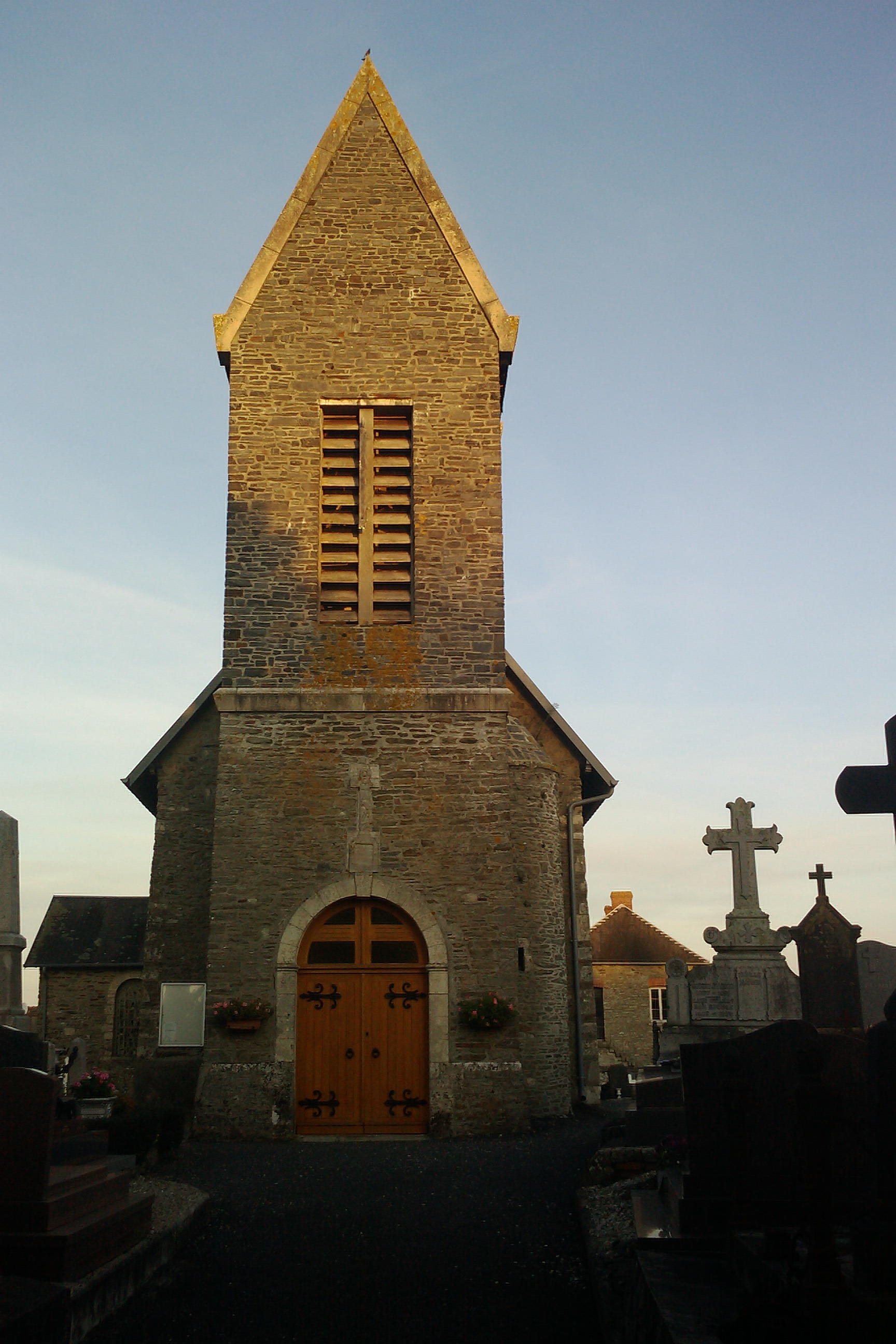
- The church of Saint-Georges

- Coat of arms
- Location of Saint-Georges-d'Elle
- Location within France Location within Normandy
- Coordinates: 49°08′57″N 0°58′13″W
- Country: France
- Region: Normandy
- Department: Manche
- Arrondissement: Saint-Lô
- Canton: Pont-Hébert
- Intercommunality: Saint-Lô Agglo

Government
  - Mayor (2020–2026): Nicolas Tostain
- Area^{1}: 8.96 km^{2} (3.46 sq mi)
- Elevation: 110 m (360 ft)
- Highest elevation: 192 m (630 ft)
- Lowest elevation: 71 m (233 ft)
- Population (2023): 380
  - Density: 42/km^{2} (110/sq mi)
- Time zone: UTC+01:00 (CET)
  - Summer (DST): UTC+02:00 (CEST)
- INSEE/Postal code: 50473 /50680
- ^{1} French Land Register data, which excludes lakes, ponds, glaciers > 1 km^{2} (0.386 sq mi or 247 acres) and river estuaries.

Saint-Georges-d'Elle (French pronunciation: [sɛ̃ ʒɔʁʒ dɛl], literally Saint Georges of Elle) is a commune in the Manche department in Normandy in north-western France.

== See also ==
- Communes of the Manche department
