= Neuilly-la-Forêt =

- Part of Isigny-sur-Mer
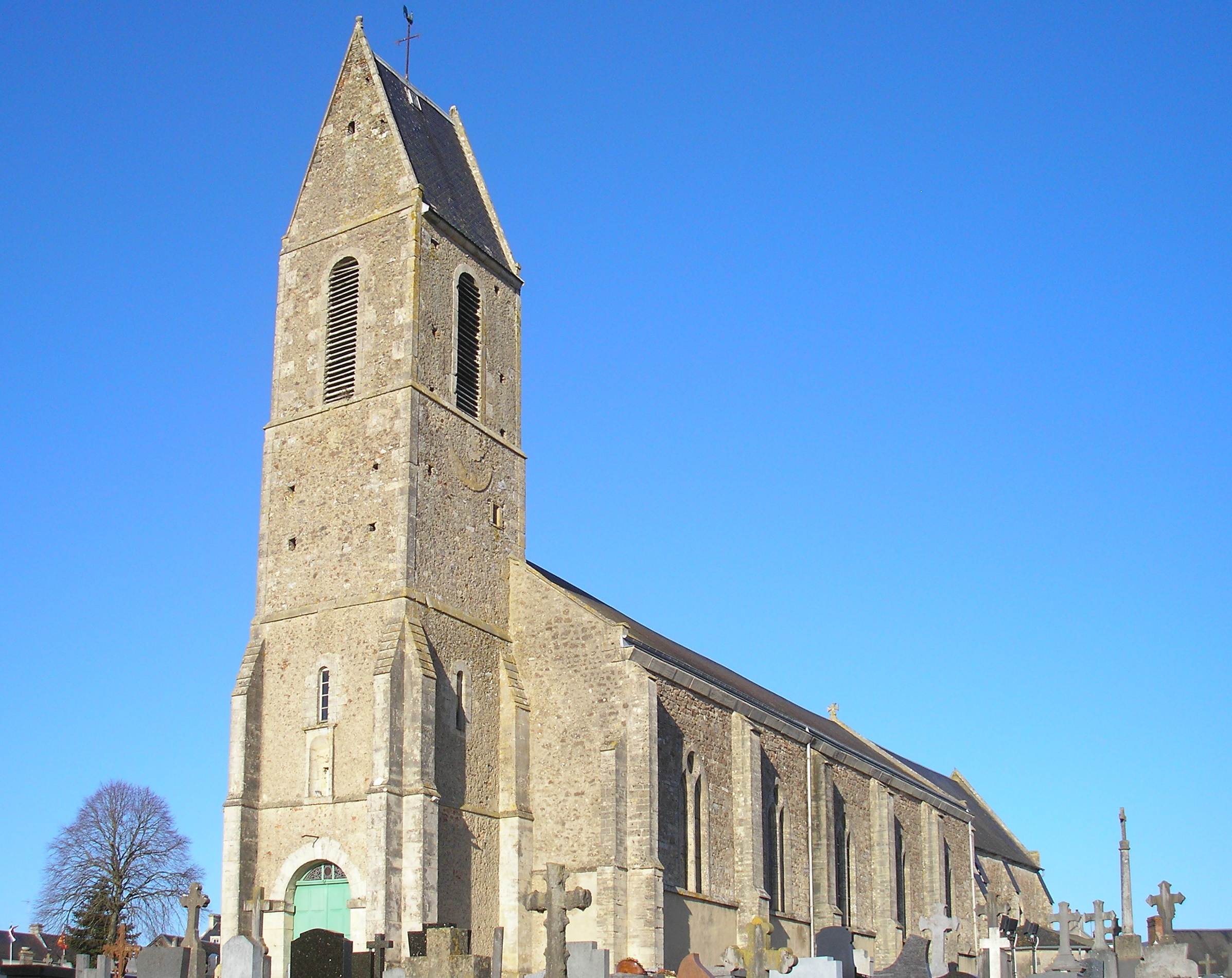
- Location of Neuilly-la-Forêt
- Location within France Location within Normandy
- Coordinates: 49°16′18″N 1°05′52″W
- Country: France
- Region: Normandy
- Department: Calvados
- Arrondissement: Bayeux
- Canton: Trévières
- Commune: Isigny-sur-Mer
- Area^{1}: 21.20 km^{2} (8.19 sq mi)
- Elevation: 35 m (115 ft)
- Highest elevation: 57 m (187 ft)
- Lowest elevation: 0 m (0 ft)
- Population (2023): 417
  - Density: 19.7/km^{2} (50.9/sq mi)
- Time zone: UTC+01:00 (CET)
  - Summer (DST): UTC+02:00 (CEST)
- Postal code: 14230
- ^{1} French Land Register data, which excludes lakes, ponds, glaciers > 1 km^{2} (0.386 sq mi or 247 acres) and river estuaries.

Neuilly-la-Forêt (French pronunciation: [nøji la fɔʁɛ]) is a former commune in the department of Calvados in the Normandy region in northwestern France. On 1 January 2017, it was merged into the commune Isigny-sur-Mer.

== See also ==
- Communes of the Calvados department
