= Cerisy-la-Forêt =

French commune

- Commune
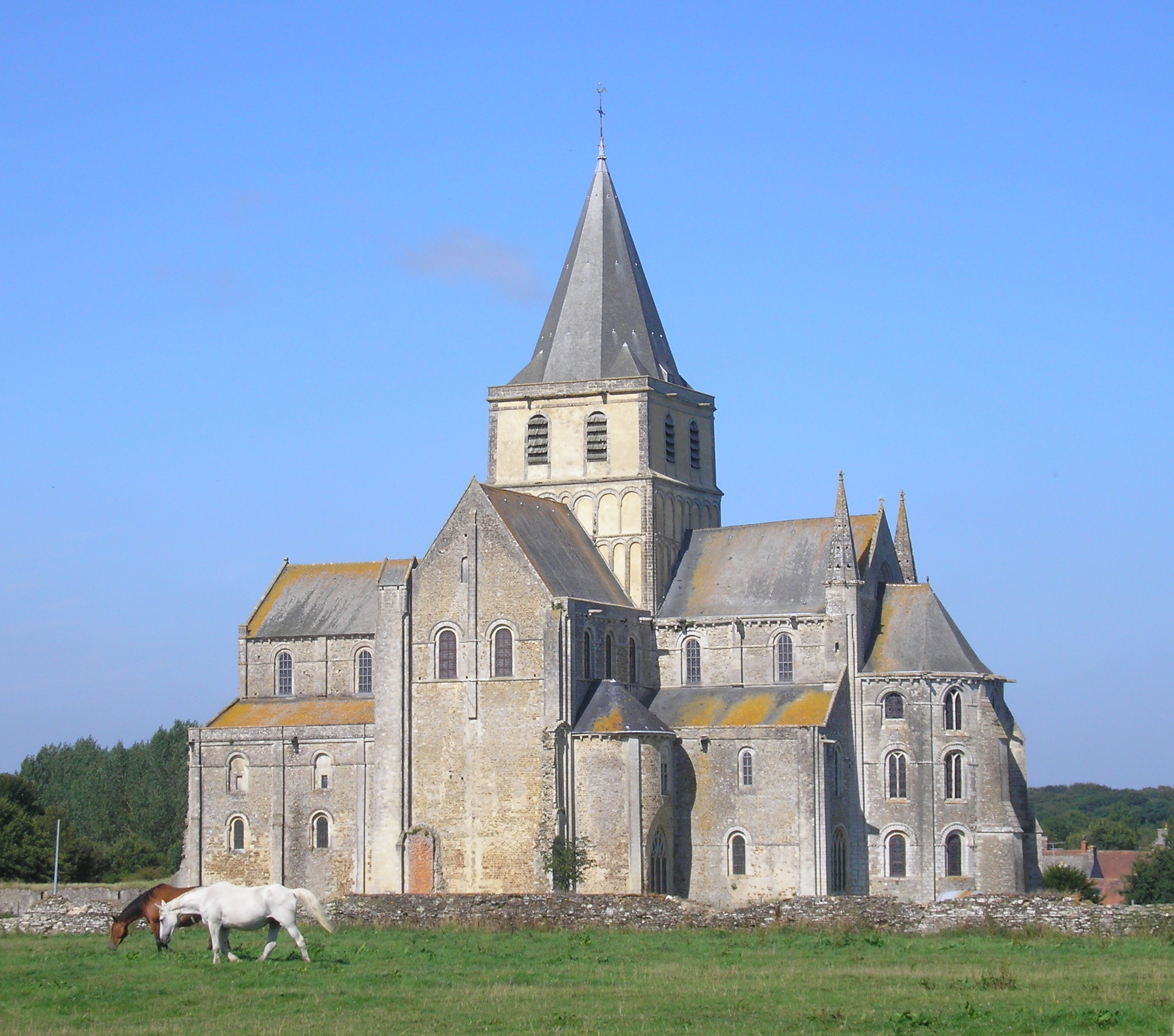
- The abbey in Cerisy-la-Forêt
- Location of Cerisy-la-Forêt
- Location within France Location within Normandy
- Coordinates: 49°11′45″N 0°56′08″W
- Country: France
- Region: Normandy
- Department: Manche
- Arrondissement: Saint-Lô
- Canton: Pont-Hébert
- Intercommunality: Saint-Lô Agglo

Government
  - Mayor (2020–2026): Jean-Pierre Ledouit
- Area^{1}: 23.81 km^{2} (9.19 sq mi)
- Elevation: 84 m (276 ft)
- Highest elevation: 131 m (430 ft)
- Lowest elevation: 34 m (112 ft)
- Population (2023): 1,004
  - Density: 42.17/km^{2} (109.2/sq mi)
- Time zone: UTC+01:00 (CET)
  - Summer (DST): UTC+02:00 (CEST)
- INSEE/Postal code: 50110 /50680
- ^{1} French Land Register data, which excludes lakes, ponds, glaciers > 1 km^{2} (0.386 sq mi or 247 acres) and river estuaries.

Cerisy-la-Forêt (French pronunciation: [səʁizi la fɔʁɛ]) is a commune in the Manche department of Normandy in north-western France. It possesses an important environmental and architectural heritage.

The area has been occupied since ancient times and is linked to the sixth-century founding of the Saint-Vigor Abbey which flourished in the eleventh century. The commune encompasses 2,381 hectares which include Château de la Boulaye, Château de la Couespellière, and manor houses. it is bordered by Cerisy forest.

== Geography ==
Cerisy-la-Forêt is east of the Pays saint-lois and west of Bessin, to which it was attached in antiquity. It occupies the extreme north of the Massif Armoricain, an area of dairy farms. Wooded areas, wetlands, meadows, and pastures with hedges comprise the landscape. The nearest stations are Gare de Lison and Gare de Le Molay-Littry. The village is located 13.4 km northeast of Saint-Lô, as the crow files, overlooking the valley of the Elle and offering an unobstructed panorama of Cerisy Forest a kilometer away.

Bayeux is 18 kilometers directly east, Saint-Lô, prefecture of the département, is 14 km to the south-west, and Caen is 42 km to the east.

=== Geology ===
Cerisy-la-Forêt's subsoil dates from the Proterozoic geological period. The Armorican Massif, to the south-west, is a deposit made up of clays, schists, gravels, and granite. The altitude of the village ranges between 34 meters and 131 meters. The small hill called "Vieux Graviers", located at the edge of Cerisy-la-Forêt, is the highest point.

=== Hydrography ===
The commune is completely within the Vire River basin. Nearby to the north is the basin of the tributary Esque River and to the south is the Elle River basin. The "Cerisy National Forest," a national nature reserve, is also protected as a nature area of habitat, botanical and zoologic interest ("zone naturelle d'intérêt écologique, faunistique et floristique," or ZNEIFF) under the name "forêt de Cerisy" and managed by the "Office national des forêts.

=== Climate ===
The climate is oceanic, with an annual rainfall close to 900mm. Rains are fairly frequent throughout the year but more abundant in autumn and winter due to disturbances from the Atlantic Ocean. Rarely intense, they are often drizzles. The northwest wind also brings rapid climate changes in which sunshine and heavy showers can succeed one another separated by only a few hours.

The average temperature is 10 °C. In winter, the average temperature oscillates between 1 °C and 7 °C with between 30 and 40 days of frost per year. In summer, the average temperature is around 20 °C.

Cerisy-la-Forêt does not have a weather station; the closest one is that of Caen-Carpiquet.

== Name ==
Arms of Cerisy Abbey

'Cerisy-la-Forêt' is often referred to as 'Cerisy'. The name's origin is undocumented and undetermined. "Cerise" is the French word for "cherry," and at one time this was thought to be the origin. However, the ancient word for "cherry orchard" would have evolved into a modern name like "Cerisay" or "Cerise."

Current thought is that the area bears the name of an ancient Gallo-Roman who owned it and might have been called Cerisius or Cesarius. One of the oldest mentions of the place dates from the 9th century when one of the Dukes of Normandy called it Cerasiacus in a charter. Under the Ancien Régime its name referred to the abbey: abbatia Cerasii in 1042; abbas de Cereseio in 1351. The name was changed after the French Revolution to Cerisy-la-Forêt to refer to the nearby Cerisy Forest.

== History ==
=== Ancient history ===
Cerisy was first settled as an oppidum, the ruins of which remain outside the town. The Romans built a fort to guard the Roman road that ran through the valley.

=== Middle Ages ===
The earliest mention of Cerisy-la-Forêt dates back to the 6th century when Gaul began to Christianize. Vigor, one of the first evangelists in the region, received from Volusian, the local lord, twenty-five villages as thanks for having rid the region of a "horrible serpent that put to death men and animals". Around 510 AD he built a monastery dedicated to St. Peter and St. Paul on the site of what had been a Druid holy site.

Vigor's monastery was destroyed when Vikings invaded Neustria in the 9th century. They plundered Bayeux in 891 and King Charles III the Simple gave Rollo the countries of the lower Seine in the Treaty of Saint-Clair-sur-Epte in 911, and then Bessin in 924.

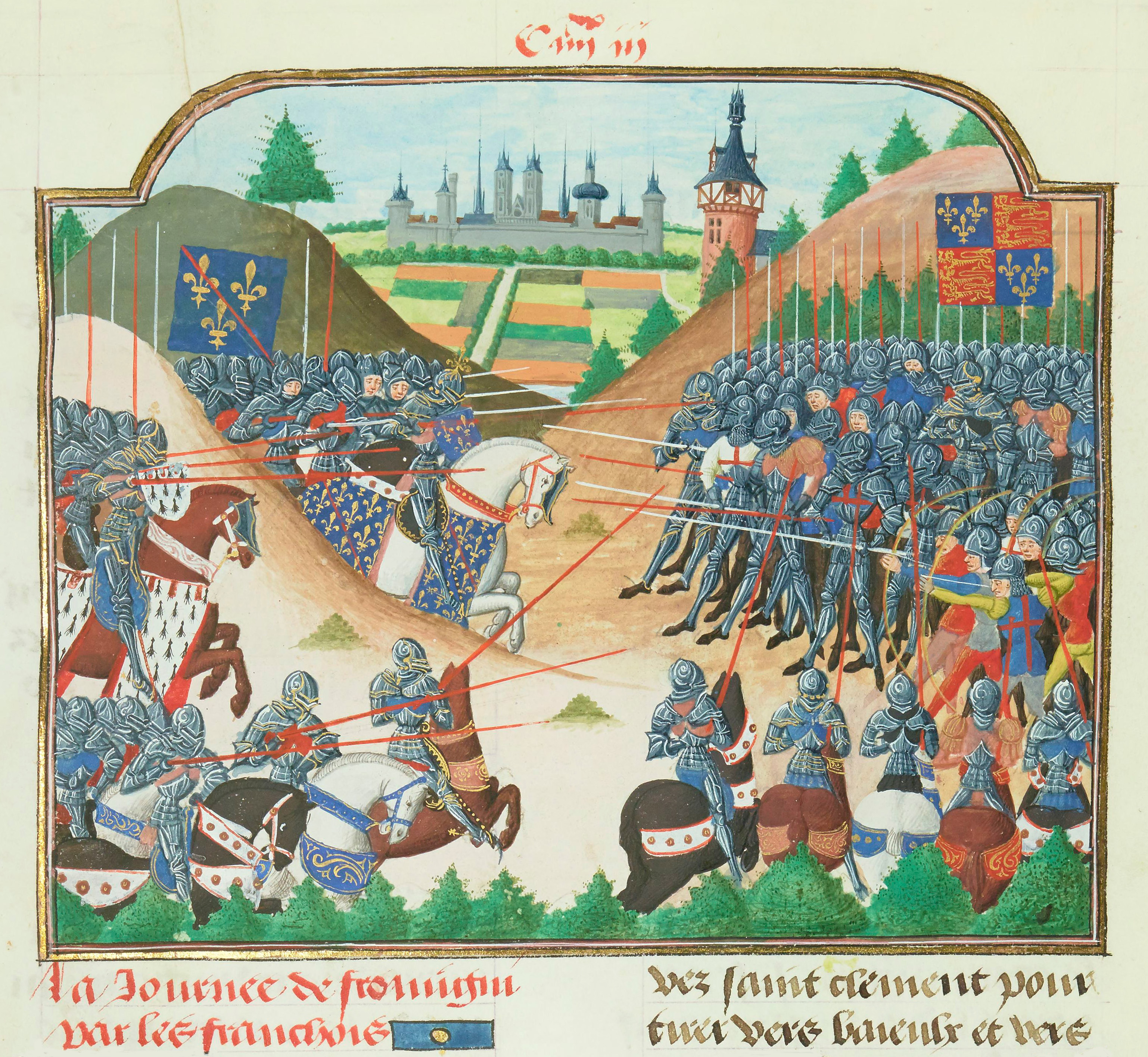
The battle of Formigny

Cerisy became an important market town under the Normans, who built Cerisy Abbey. The abbey went on to consist of forty-eight parishes and eight priories, including two in England (Sherborne and Peterborough). Dependent on the Holy See, Cerisy maintained close relations with monasteries in Mont-Saint-Michel, Saint-Ouen, Jumièges, Le Bec-Hellouin, Fécamp and of course Caen.

In 1337, the dynastic rivalries between the Valois and the king of England precipitated the Hundred Years' War, plunging the country into misery aggravated by epidemics of plague. The Abbey of Saint-Vigor de Cerisy was fortified and a garrison settled there. In 1418 Richard de Silly, knight and captain of the abbey, was obliged to cede the abbey to the King of England. However, after the victory of the constable de Richemont over the English at the Battle of Formigny in 1450, Normandy returned definitively to the kingdom of France.

=== Modern history ===
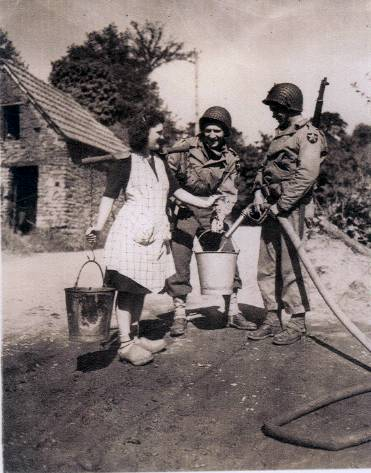
Two American soldiers helping a young farmer from Cerisy-la-Forêt: This photo appeared on the front page of The New York Times in June 1944.

The death certificates of several soldiers recorded in the 16th and 17th centuries, as well as records of their marriages and the baptisms of their children, leave evidence that maréchaussée garrison was based in the village and a prison established on the abbey farm. These maréchaux were housed in the abbey enclosure with the judges who dispensed justice. The hall of justice and its adjoining cell have withstood the test of time, suffering invasion and fire. All that remains of the maréchaussée prison is the lintel over the entrance which reads, "Tremblez, tremblez diables d'enfer, aussitôt qu'en prison on vous traînera, vos bras seront liés de lourdes chaines de fer et vous les porterez tels et vous apprendrez à chicaner" ("Tremble, tremble you devils of hell. As soon as we drag you to prison, your arms will be bound with heavy iron chains and you will wear them as such and you will learn to quibble"). The confessional is adjacent to the courtroom and the abbey cell. The numerous graffiti appear on the walls in two bands. The lower indicating that in the 16th century the prisoners actually did wear "heavy iron chains" which allowed them to only carve simple shapes at a low height. In the 17th century, prisoners were unchained and had more freedom to move about the cell. The straw that had always been thrown in the cell to cover the floor was never removed. It built up layers that covered and protected the lower graffiti of the restricted, earlier prisoners. The higher graffiti is more elaborate and expressive.

=== Modern era ===
During the Second World War, Cerisy-la-Forêt sheltered refugees from Cherbourg. On 2 July 1944 General Eisenhower and Omar Bradley came to encourage the 2nd Infantry Division at the Château de la Boulaye.

==== The Battle of Moulin des Rondelles ====
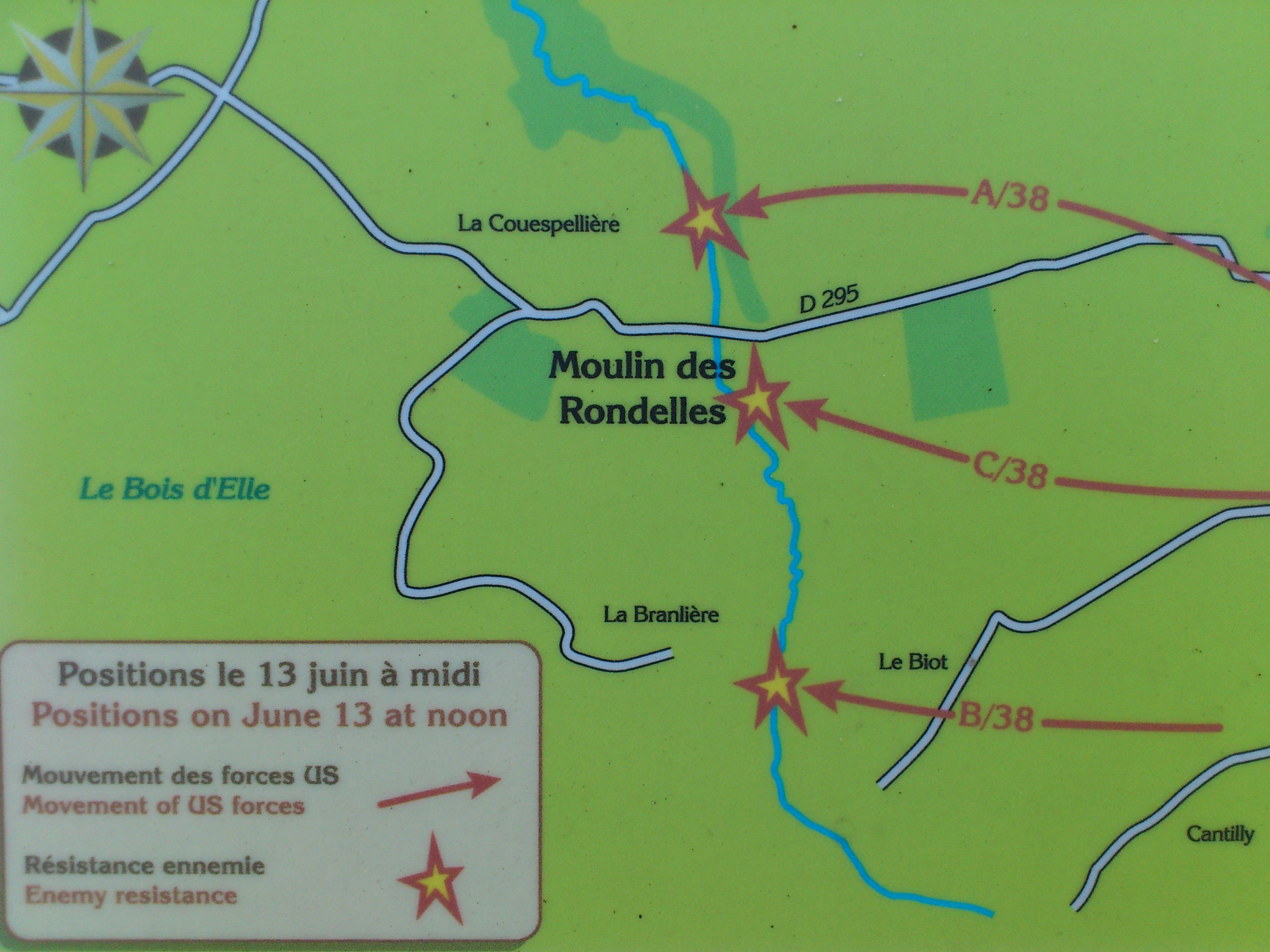
Battle of Moulin des Rondelles

On 12 June 1944 the 2nd Infantry Division was ordered to cross the Elle river. When they reached the east bank, they encountered German resistance, which foreshadowed the end of the rapid advance begun on 7 June 1944. It was a small easily crossed river, but its crossing was difficult. A first attempt was stopped by machine-gun and mortar fire from the west bank. On 13 June 1944 the men of Company C of the 38th Infantry Regiment were ordered to cross the river at this point. The first attempt in the morning failed and it was only in the afternoon after the second offensive that they succeeded in reaching the other bank.

Ten men of Company C were killed and 23 others wounded in the fighting. The total losses of the 2nd Infantry Division during the two days of combat amounted to 540 killed, wounded or missing in action.

During the second attack of Company C on 13 June 1944, the men were stopped by machine gun fire. German mortars began to adjust their fire on the American position. Advancing under mortars of their own, the men of C Company were successful in clearing out the area.

=== Gallery ===
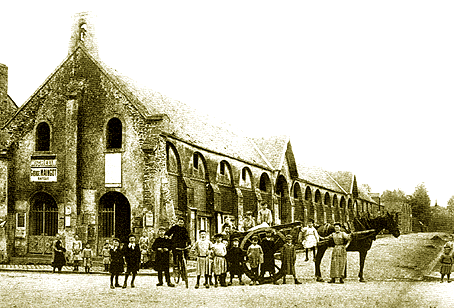
Cerisy-la-Forêt, rue halles (1920)

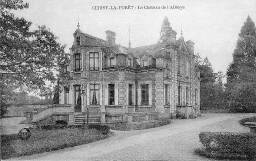
Chateau de l'Abbaye

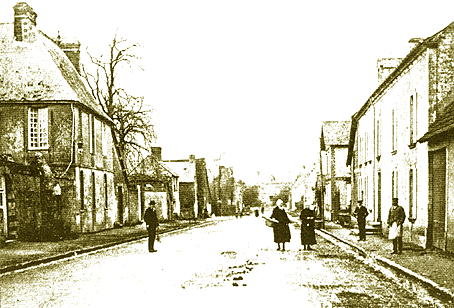
Cerisy-la-Forêt schools 1900

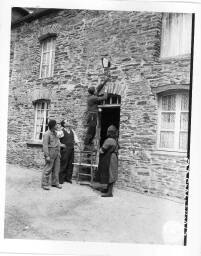
Liberation of Cerisy Nouveau

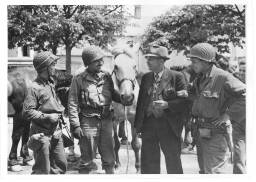
Eugène Godin.

== Population ==
Historical population

Year	Pop.	±% p.a.
1793	2,151	—
1800	2,105	−0.31%
1806	2,267	+1.24%
1821	2,019	−0.77%
1831	2,164	+0.70%
1836	2,167	+0.03%
1841	2,055	−1.06%
1846	2,112	+0.55%
1851	1,995	−1.13%
1856	1,910	−0.87%
1861	1,873	−0.39%
1866	1,858	−0.16%
1872	1,794	−0.58%
1876	1,822	+0.39%
1881	1,770	−0.58%
1886	1,700	−0.80%
1891	1,620	−0.96%
1896	1,532	−1.11%
1901	1,510	−0.29%

Year	Pop.	±% p.a.
1906	1,480	−0.40%
1911	1,357	−1.72%
1921	1,188	−1.32%
1926	1,216	+0.47%
1931	1,175	−0.68%
1936	1,239	+1.07%
1946	1,280	+0.33%
1954	1,189	−0.92%
1962	1,103	−0.93%
1968	1,051	−0.80%
1975	923	−1.84%
1982	941	+0.28%
1990	784	−2.26%
1999	839	+0.76%
2007	909	+1.01%
2012	936	+0.59%
2017	1,034	+2.01%
2023	1,004	−0.49%

Source: EHESS and INSEE (1968-2023)

== See also ==
- Communes of the Manche department
