= Saint-Jean-de-Savigny =

- Commune
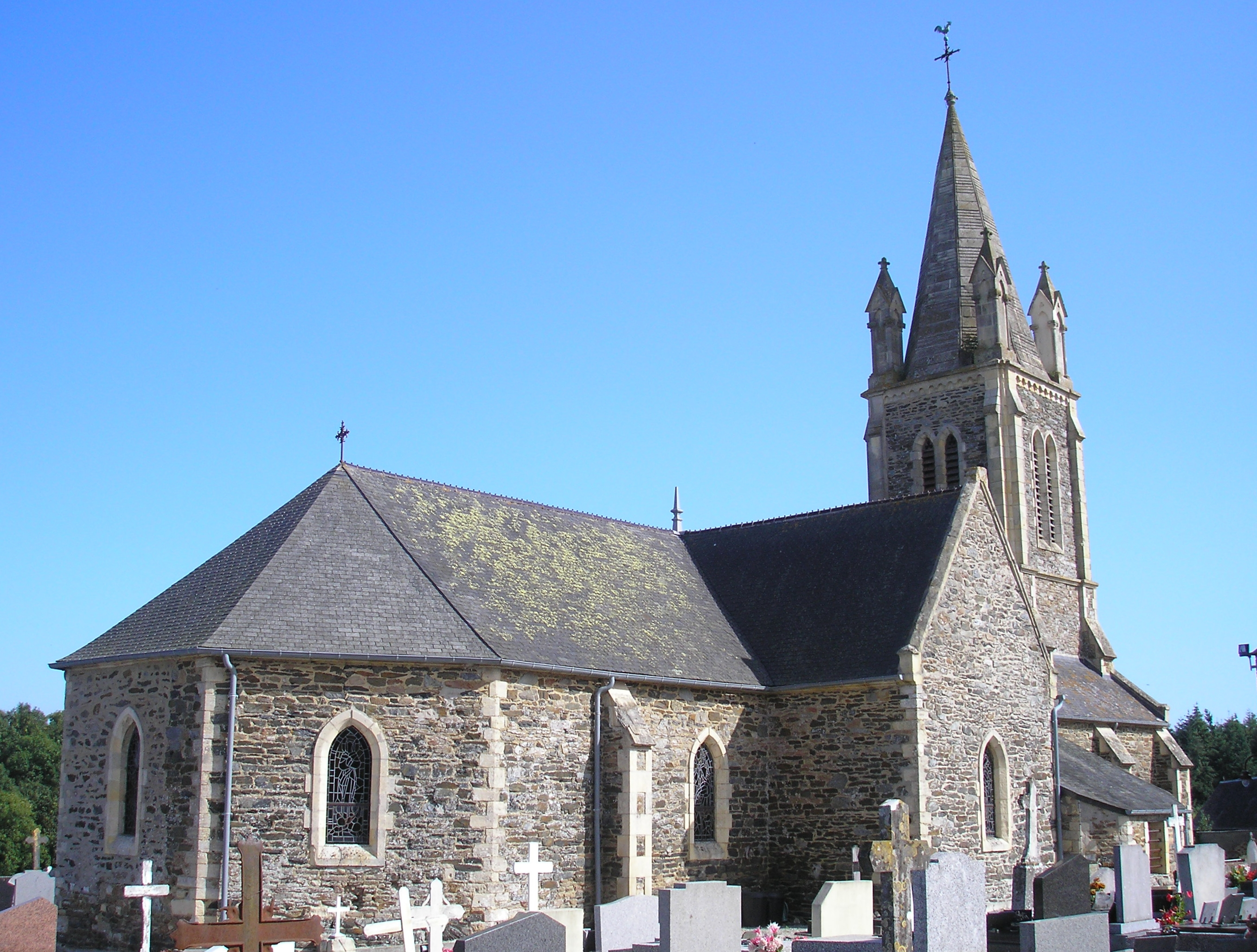
- The church of Saint-Jean-Baptiste
- Location of Saint-Jean-de-Savigny
- Location within France Location within Normandy
- Coordinates: 49°11′43″N 0°59′29″W
- Country: France
- Region: Normandy
- Department: Manche
- Arrondissement: Saint-Lô
- Canton: Pont-Hébert
- Intercommunality: Saint-Lô Agglo

Government
  - Mayor (2020–2026): Emmanuel Lunel
- Area^{1}: 7.58 km^{2} (2.93 sq mi)
- Elevation: 66 m (217 ft)
- Highest elevation: 101 m (331 ft)
- Lowest elevation: 17 m (56 ft)
- Population (2023): 416
  - Density: 54.9/km^{2} (142/sq mi)
- Time zone: UTC+01:00 (CET)
  - Summer (DST): UTC+02:00 (CEST)
- INSEE/Postal code: 50491 /50680
- ^{1} French Land Register data, which excludes lakes, ponds, glaciers > 1 km^{2} (0.386 sq mi or 247 acres) and river estuaries.

Saint-Jean-de-Savigny (French pronunciation: [sɛ̃ ʒɑ̃ də saviɲi]) is a commune in the Manche department in Normandy in north-western France.

== See also ==
- Communes of the Manche department
